= 7flix =

Australian digital television multichannel

- Logo used since 2020
- Type: Movies • General entertainment
- Country: Australia
- Broadcast area: Sydney; Melbourne; Brisbane; Adelaide; Perth; Regional Queensland; Northern NSW & Gold Coast; Southern NSW & ACT; Regional Victoria; Mildura
- Network: Seven Network

Programming
- Language: English
- Picture format: 576i SDTV

Ownership
- Owner: Seven Media Group
- Sister channels: Channel 7; 7HD; 7two 7mate 7Bravo; TVSN; Racing.com

History
- Launched: 28 February 2016; 10 years ago

Links
- Website: 7plus.com.au

Availability

Terrestrial
- Freeview Seven owned (virtual): 76/66
- Freeview Seven Regional (virtual): 66

Streaming media
- 7plus

7flix is an Australian free-to-air digital television multichannel, which was launched by the Seven Network on 28 February 2016.

7flix targets a variety of viewers and offers drama, comedy, reality, docusoap, and movies.

== History ==
On 18 December 2015, a test pattern began broadcasting on channel 76, reading "New Channel Coming Soon". Seven acknowledged the broadcast, and director of programming, Angus Ross, formally announced on 1 February 2016 that Seven was launching a new channel, and more details would be released soon. During the ad-break of miniseries Molly on 7 February 2016, Seven announced that channel 76 would be named 7flix, and would be launched on 28 February 2016. The "New Channel" test pattern then was replaced with a continuous promo loop for 7flix.

7flix began broadcasting at 6am on 28 February 2016 in MPEG-4. The channel airs movies in its prime time slots with television series and other entertainment at other times. 7flix was added to Seven's live-streaming service, PLUS7 Live, upon its launch.

On 13 April 2016, it was announced the channel would amend its schedule, shifting its focus from movies to more American dramas. This change began in the weeks prior, when Grey's Anatomy premiered at 8:30pm, which was initially designated as a "movie-exclusive" time slot. The change also saw the addition of repeats of Criminal Minds to Thursday nights.

On 3 June 2016, 7flix became available on more TVs as the channel switched to MPEG-2.

On 3 August 2017, 18 months after launching in metropolitan areas, Prime7 announced that it would carry 7flix to regional stations in northern and southern New South Wales, regional Victoria and Mildura. The channel launched at 6:00 am on 3 September on digital channel 66, in an MPEG-4 format.

In December 2019, the Seven Network announced that 7flix would rebrand in 2020 to target a young female audience. In July 2020, the Seven Network unveiled its new rebranding of 7flix, with a new purple ribbon-like design and text and on air graphics to coincide with the revamp of its multichannel stations.

== Programming ==
The launch titles for 7flix included new episodes of US series Once Upon A Time, The Muppets, The Mindy Project, Cougar Town, and The Amazing Race, which had previously debuted on the Seven Network. Premiere series such as Black-ish, Grandfathered, Galavant and Agent Carter debuted at a later date. Throughout 2016, new episodes of Agents of S.H.I.E.L.D., Grey's Anatomy, How to Get Away with Murder, Quantico and Scandal aired exclusively on the channel. Also featured on the channel were marathons of The Big Bang Theory.

7flix initially aired a variety of children's series from Disney including Austin & Ally, Dog with a Blog, I Didn't Do It, Jessie, Kirby Buckets, Lab Rats and Mighty Med. The daytime schedule for the channel consists of classic sitcoms such as Benson, Bewitched, Good Times, I Dream of Jeannie and Who's The Boss? 7flix also airs encores of local programmes from the Seven Network, including House Rules and First Dates.

In 2017, US drama The Astronaut Wives Club debuted, along with the premieres of comedy series Marry Me, Bad Teacher, Dr. Ken and The Real O'Neals. Australian comedy short form series Bent 101 also made its debut on the channel.

How I Met Your Mother was added to 7flix in 2018, returning to the Seven Network as part of a deal with Fox.

7flix also aired content from the defunct 7food network channel from 29 December 2019.

The network also has ongoing content new and classic film and television brands from Sony Pictures and Universal Pictures.

=== Current programming ===
==== Children ====
- Beat Bugs (2016–present)
- Flushed (2020–present)
- Get Arty (2018–19, 2022–present)
- Get Clever (2024–present)
- It's Academic (2017–present)

==== Comedy ====
- Black-ish
- The Goldbergs
- Lopez vs Lopez
- The Big Bang Theory

==== Drama ====
- Angel
- Bones
- Buffy the Vampire Slayer
- Code Black
- CSI: Crime Scene Investigation
- CSI: Miami
- CSI: NY
- House
- Law & Order
- Law & Order: Criminal Intent
- Law & Order: Special Victims Unit
- Life
- Monk
- Revenge

==== News and documentaries ====
- What Really Happens in Bali
- What Really Happens in Thailand

==== Reality ====
- The Amazing Race
- Australian Spartan
- Back with the Ex
- Bondi Vet
- Bride & Prejudice
- Bringing Sexy Back
- First Dates
- First Dates UK
- House Rules
- Instant Hotel
- Judge Judy
- Kiss Bang Love
- Kitchen Nightmares USA
- My Kitchen Rules
- Ramsay's Hotel Hell
- Ramsay's Kitchen Nightmares
- Yummy Mummies
- Zumbo's Just Desserts
- The Voice (2012–2020, moved to Seven in 2021)

==== Soap opera ====
- Home and Away

=== Former programming ===
==== Adult animation ====
- American Dad!
- Family Guy
- Futurama
- The Simpsons

==== Children ====
- The 7D (2016–18)
- A.N.T. Farm (2016–17)
- Austin & Ally (2016–18)
- Best Friends Whenever (2017–19)
- Crash & Bernstein (2016–18)
- The Deep (2018–20)
- Dog with a Blog (2016–19)
- Drop Dead Weird (2017–18, 2022)
- The Evermoor Chronicles (2017–19)
- Fish Hooks (2016–17)
- Gamer's Guide to Pretty Much Everything (2016–19)
- Girl Meets World (2017–19)
- Good Luck Charlie (2016–17)
- Gravity Falls (2016–19)
- Hairy Legs (2018)
- History Hunters (2017–18)
- I Didn't Do It (2016–19)
- In Your Dreams (2017–19)
- Jessie (2016–19)
- K.C. Undercover (2016–18)
- Kickin' It (2016–18)
- Kirby Buckets (2016–19)
- Kitty is Not a Cat (2018–20, 2023)
- Lab Rats (2016–19)
- Liv and Maddie (2017–19)
- Match It (2017–23)
- Mighty Med (2016–18)
- Motown Magic (2022)
- News of the Wild (2019–24)
- Oh Yuck! (2017, 2023)
- Paddle Pop: Atlantos (2016)
- Pair of Kings (2016–17)
- Penn Zero: Part-Time Hero (2017–19)
- Phineas and Ferb (2016–17)
- Pickle and Peanut (2017–19)
- Randy Cunningham: 9th Grade Ninja (2016–18)
- Sally Bollywood: Super Detective (2020)
- Saturday Disney (2016)
- Shake it Up (2016)
- Spit it Out (2017–21)
- Star vs. the Forces of Evil (2017–19)
- Star Wars Rebels (2017–18)
- Tashi (2018–19)
- Wander Over Yonder (2017–19)
- The Wild Adventures of Blinky Bill (2022)
- Win, Lose or Draw (2017)
- The Woodlies (2017)
- Zeke and Luther (2016)
- ZooMoo (2016–24)

==== Preschool ====
- Art Attack (2016–18)
- Doc McStuffins (2016–19)
- Henry Hugglemonster (2016–19)
- Jake and the Never Land Pirates (2016–19)
- The Lion Guard (2016–19)
- Mickey Mouse Clubhouse (2016–18)
- Miles from Tomorrowland (2016–18)
- Sheriff Callie's Wild West (2016–17)
- Sofia the First (2016–19)

==== Comedy ====
- 10 Things I Hate About You
- 8 Simple Rules
- Bad Teacher
- Benson
- Bewitched
- The Big Bang Theory (2016–17)
- Cougar Town
- Diff'rent Strokes
- Dr. Ken
- Family Tools (2016–17)
- Galavant (2016)
- Glee
- Good Times
- Grandfathered
- Happy Endings (2016)
- How I Met Your Mother
- I Dream of Jeannie
- Just Shoot Me!
- Malibu Country (2016–17)
- Manhattan Love Story
- Married... with Children
- Marry Me
- M*A*S*H
- Men at Work
- The Mindy Project (2016–17)
- Mixology
- Modern Family (final season)
- The Muppets
- The Nanny
- The Neighbors
- Psych
- The Real O'Neals
- Scrubs
- Seinfeld
- Trophy Wife
- Who's The Boss?

==== Drama ====
- 800 Words
- Absentia
- Agent Carter (2016)
- Agents of S.H.I.E.L.D.
- American Crime
- The Astronaut Wives Club
- Battle Creek
- Betrayal
- The Blacklist
- Blindspot
- Body of Proof (2016–17)
- Brothers & Sisters
- Castle
- Covert Affairs (2016)
- Criminal Minds
- Criminal Minds: Beyond Borders
- Criminal Minds: Suspect Behavior
- Defiance
- Desperate Housewives
- Dynamo: Magician Impossible
- The Good Doctor
- Grey's Anatomy
- Grimm
- The Guardian
- Hoges: The Paul Hogan Story
- How to Get Away with Murder
- Law & Order: LA
- Law & Order: Trial By Jury
- Law & Order True Crime
- Intelligence
- Liar
- The Mentalist
- Mistresses
- Molly (2016)
- Motive (2016)
- Nikita
- Nip/Tuck
- Once Upon A Time
- Once Upon a Time in Wonderland
- Private Practice (2016)
- Quantico (2016–17)
- Red Band Society
- Red Widow (2016–17)
- Resurrection
- The Rookie
- Royal Pains
- Scandal
- The Secret Daughter
- Smallville
- State of Affairs
- Wanted (2017)
- Zero Hour (2016)

==== News and documentaries ====
- Australia: The Story of Us
- Border Security: Australia's Front Line
- The Force: Behind the Line (2017)
- Highway Cops (2017)
- The Zoo

==== Game shows ====
- Behave Yourself!
- Cannonball

==== Reality ====
- The Amazing Race Australia
- The Aussie Property Flippers (2017)
- Big Brother
- Celebrity Splash
- Hell's Kitchen Australia
- Little Big Shots
- The Mentor
- Restaurant Revolution (2016)
- Seven Year Switch
- Whodunnit?

==== Food ====
- Barefoot Contessa
- Beach Bites with Katie Lee
- Brunch at Bobby's
- Cake Wars
- Chopped
- Cupcake Wars
- Cutthroat Kitchen
- Diners, Drive-Ins and Dives
- Food Network Star
- Giada at Home
- The Great Food Truck Race
- Guy's Big Bite
- Guy's Grocery Games
- Holiday Baking Championship
- Iron Chef America
- Kids Baking Championship
- The Kitchen
- Mystery Diners
- The Pioneer Woman
- Restaurant: Impossible
- Spring Baking Championship
- Throwdown! with Bobby Flay

==== Lifestyle ====
- Anh Does...

==== Religious ====
- Life Today with James Robison

== Availability ==
7flix is controlled from Broadcast Centre Melbourne and then transmitted via MediaHub in Sydney.

7flix is available in MPEG-4 standard definition digital in metropolitan areas and regional Queensland through Seven Network's owned-and-operated stations including ATN Sydney, HSV Melbourne, BTQ Brisbane, SAS Adelaide, TVW Perth, STQ Queensland and NEN northern New South Wales/Gold Coast, CBN southern New South Wales/ACT, AMV Victoria and PTV Mildura/Sunraysia.

7flix became available to Foxtel cable subscribers with iQ3, iQ2 and iQ1.5 set top boxes on Channel 187 from 24 March 2016.

== Logo and identity history ==
At launch in February 2016, the logo used the generic logo of the Seven Network, with the red colour being replaced by pink, and the word "flix", written in italic lowercase letters, added next to it, but using its gradients.

On 24 July 2020, Seven Network unveiled its new 7flix logo, dropping the gradient pink logo and italic text in place of a solid purple logo and non-italic text as part of a major overhaul of its multichannel stations.

28 February 2016 – 23 July 2020

24 July 2020 – present

== Slogans ==
- 2016–2020: We've Got the Fix

== See also ==
- List of digital television channels in Australia
