= 7mate =

Australian television channel

- Logo used since 2020
- Type: Men's programming • Sport
- Country: Australia
- Broadcast area: Sydney; Melbourne; Brisbane; Adelaide; Perth; Tasmania; Darwin; Regional Queensland; Northern NSW & Gold Coast; Southern NSW & ACT; Regional Victoria; Mildura; Spencer Gulf & Broken Hill; Remote Central & Eastern Australia; Western Australia
- Network: Seven Network

Programming
- Language: English
- Picture format: 576i SDTV; 1080i HDTV (Note: Available in all markets except Darwin, Spencer Gulf SA/Broken Hill NSW, Tasmania, Griffith NSW and Eastern SA.)

Ownership
- Owner: Seven Media Group
- Sister channels: Channel 7; 7HD; 7two 7flix 7Bravo; TVSN; Racing.com

History
- Launched: 25 September 2010; 16 years ago
- Replaced: 7HD (HD channel space; later relaunched in May 2016 in select cities and in the remaining cities in December 2016); 7food network (HD simulcast)

Links
- Website: 7plus.com.au

Availability

Terrestrial
- ATN Sydney (DVB-T): 1313 @ 6 (177.5 MHz)
- HSV Melbourne (DVB-T): 1329 @ 6 (177.5 MHz)
- BTQ Brisbane/Gold Coast (DVB-T): 1345 @ 6 (177.5 MHz)
- SAS Adelaide (DVB-T): 1361 @ 6 (177.5 MHz)
- TVW Perth/Mandurah (DVB-T): 1377 @ 6 (177.5 MHz)
- Seven-owned transmitters: 74/64
- Seven Regional transmitters and Northern NSW & Gold Coast: 64
- Freeview WIN Griffith NSW/Eastern SA, Seven Regional WA: 63
- Freeview Seven Regional: 63 (Tasmania, Spencer Gulf/Broken Hill); 70 (Remote Eastern & Central); 73 (Darwin)

Streaming media
- 7plus

7mate is an Australian free-to-air digital television multichannel, which was launched by the Seven Network on 25 September 2010. The channel contains sport and regular programs aimed primarily to a male audience, with programming drawn from a combination of new shows, American network shows and other shows previously aired on its sister channels Seven, 7two and 7flix.

Due to the rebroadcast of 7HD on 10 May 2016, 7mate was reduced to a standard definition broadcast in Melbourne and Adelaide. Sydney, Brisbane and Perth instead received a HD simulcast of 7mate until December 2016, with breakaway programming used from that point to broadcast AFL matches in HD while keeping 7HD as the primary channel simulcast.

== History ==
The channel began airing as a separate channel on 25 September 2010, replacing 7HD as the Seven Network's only high-definition channel. The channel's first program was the 2010 AFL Grand Final, which was simulcast with an SD broadcast on the Seven Network. Following AFL coverage, the channel began airing breakaway programming, with a promotional sneak peek of upcoming programming on 7mate. The first full program to air was an episode of That '70s Show.

Upon the revival of 7HD on 10 May 2016, 7mate was reduced to standard definition. 7HD became a HD simulcast of Seven's main channel in Melbourne and Adelaide, while it simulcast 7mate in Seven's other metropolitan markets. This configuration allowed upcoming AFL matches to be broadcast in HD in all markets.

7HD was temporarily changed to a simulcast of Seven's primary channel in Sydney, Brisbane and Perth on 5 August 2016 to allow the 2016 Summer Olympics to be broadcast in high definition in all capital cities; leaving 7mate in standard definition only. However, 7HD was reverted to its former state as a 7mate simulcast in Sydney, Brisbane and Perth on 22 August 2016 after the conclusion of the Olympics. On 16 December 2016, 7HD was shifted to a simulcast of Seven's primary channel in Sydney, Brisbane and Perth to allow the Summer of Tennis to be telecast in high definition in all capital cities; leaving 7mate in SD. This change was not reverted, with Seven instead using breakaway programming on 7HD to broadcast AFL matches on 7mate in HD.

In October 2019, Seven promised 7mate would switch to HD by 2020. On 28 December 2019, it was later revealed that a HD simulcast of 7mate would replace 7food network from 16 January 2020.

On 10 July 2020, 7mate unveiled their new logo for the first time since its launch in 2010, effectively making it in line with Seven and 7two, which only used one colour in both of their logos. The outlining from the logo was removed and the word "mate" is now in a different font.

On 6 July 2022, 7mate HD relaunched in regional areas.

On 30 November 2022, 7mate SD on channel 73 went off the air. Going to this version of 7mate would show a message to watch 7mate HD on channel 74 and also mentioning people might need to re-scan their TV. Two weeks later on 14 December 2022, the 7mate retune placeholder disappeared.

== Programming ==
The channel is targeting a demographic of 15- to 55-year-old males, after the success of the Seven Network with 7two with females 35+ and 25+ demographics respectively. Programs aired on the channel are a mix of repeated shows that moved from the Seven Network or 7two, programs that would make their free-to-air debut and brand new shows to Australian television. Seven and 7two now target its 55+ demographic.

Shows that moved from other Seven channels include new seasons of Family Guy, American Dad! and The Amazing Race. Repeated seasons of Scrubs, Last Comic Standing, Air Crash Investigations, 30 Rock, That '70s Show, Lost and How I Met Your Mother also moved to 7mate. Mighty Ships, of which three episodes aired as one-off specials on the Seven Network, moved as a regular series to 7mate.

Programs making their free-to-air debut include Eastbound and Down, Monster Garage, Jersey Shore, Gene Simmons Family Jewels and Punk'd. Various series which have debuts on this channel include The Equalizer, Warehouse 13 and Caprica. Additionally, the channel would feature a number of sporting events. From 2012, all AFL matches are broadcast live on 7mate in New South Wales, Australia and Queensland, Australia.

In 2012, the Seven Network introduced new weekday morning blocks of children's programming to air on both 7TWO and 7mate. Branded as K-Zone, the 7mate block featured male-skewing Disney series such as Phineas and Ferb, Kick Buttowski: Suburban Daredevil, Pair of Kings and Zeke and Luther, while the 7TWO block aired female-skewing programs branded as Total Girl.

7mate's local production Bogan Hunters premiered to the channel's highest ratings for a non-sport program on 13 May 2014.

On 29 February 2016, 7mate removed all children's programming from its schedule and moved it to 7flix, replacing it with lifestyle fishing shows.

On 28 February 2018, 7mate started "Animate Your Wednesday", showing Family Guy, and American Dad!. The Simpsons was added to 7mate, after Network 10 joined with CBS in 2017, removing The Simpsons.

on 16 January 2019, Futurama was added to the Animate Your Wednesday lineup on 7mate, returning to the Seven Network as part of a deal with FOX and after a long absence since its final broadcast on Seven in 2004.

On October 16 2020, Regular Old Bogan premiered on 7mate, as part of the "Animate Your Wednesday" block and ran until November 23, 2020 with a double episode special, due to the first season getting wrapped up.

The network also has ongoing content new and classic film and television brands from Sony Pictures and Universal Pictures.

=== Current programming ===
==== Adult Animation ====
- Family Guy
- American Dad!

==== Comedy ====
- It's Always Sunny in Philadelphia

==== Documentary ====
- Catch It Keep It
- Deadly Down Under
- MythBusters
- Ultimate Factories

==== Lifestyle ====
- Adventure Angler
- Blokesworld
- The Last Cast
- Mark Berg's Fishing Addiction
- Merv Hughes Fishing
- My Fishing Place
- River to Reef
- The Weekend Prospector

==== Reality ====
- American Hoggers
- American Restoration
- Aussie Salvage Squad
- Big Rig Bounty Hunters
- Counting Cars
- Deadliest Catch
- Flipping Ships
- Hardcore Pawn
- Ice Cold Catch
- Ice Road Truckers
- Ink Master
- Iron Resurrection
- Jesse James: Outlaw Garage
- Meteorite Men
- Outback Truckers
- Pawn Stars
- Restoration Garage
- Swamp People
- Texas Car Wars
- Texas Metal

==== Factual ====
- Air Cops
- Desert Collectors
- Highway Patrol
- Towies

==== Sport ====
- Australian Football League
- Big Bash League
- The Front Bar
- LPL Pro
- National Football League
- NFL 100 Greatest

*

=== Former programming ===
==== Adult animation ====
- The Cleveland Show (2022)
- Futurama (2019–20)
- Regular Old Bogan
- The Simpsons (2018–23)

==== Children's (2012–2016) ====
- A.N.T. Farm (2012–14)
- Austin & Ally (2013–14, 2016)
- Crash & Bernstein (2015–16)
- Dog with a Blog (2014)
- Fish Hooks (2012–16)
- Good Luck Charlie (2014)
- Gravity Falls (2014–16)
- I Didn't Do It (2015)
- I'm in the Band (2012–14)
- Jessie (2016)
- Kick Buttowski: Suburban Daredevil (2012–16)
- Kickin' It (2015)
- Lab Rats (2015)
- Pair of Kings (2012–15)
- Phineas and Ferb (2012–15)
- PrankStars (2013–15)
- Randy Cunningham: 9th Grade Ninja (2015)
- Shake It Up (2014)
- So Random! (2014–15)
- Star Wars Rebels (2014–16)
- Stitch! (2012–13)
- Ultimate Spider-Man (2013–15)
- Win, Lose or Draw (2015)
- Zeke and Luther (2012–15)

==== Preschool (2012–2016) ====
- Art Attack (2013–16)
- Doc McStuffins (2014–16)
- Jake and the Never Land Pirates (2012–16)
- Handy Manny (2012–16)
- Henry Hugglemonster (2014–16)
- Mickey Mouse Clubhouse (2014–16)
- Sheriff Callie's Wild West (2015–16)
- Sofia the First (2014–16)

==== Comedy ====
- 30 Rock
- According to Jim
- The Big Bang Theory
- Black-ish
- Chappelle's Show
- The Chasers War on Everything
- CNNNN
- Crank Yankers
- Crazy Like a Fox
- Darradong Local Council
- The Drew Carey Show
- Eastbound & Down
- Fat Pizza: Back in Business
- Gary Unmarried
- Housos: The Thong Warrior
- How I Met Your Mother
- The Jeff Foxworthy Show
- Just Shoot Me!
- Malcolm & Eddie
- Married... with Children
- McHale's Navy
- My Name Is Earl
- My Wife and Kids
- Ned and Stacey
- NewsRadio
- Parks and Recreation
- Rude Tube
- Scrubs
- Seinfeld
- That '70s Show

==== Drama ====
- Adam-12
- Airwolf
- Alias Smith and Jones
- The A-Team
- Baywatch
- Boston Legal
- Buck Rogers in the 25th Century
- The Cape
- Caprica
- Charlie's Angels
- Covert Affairs
- The Event
- The Equalizer
- FlashForward
- Hercules: The Legendary Journeys
- The Incredible Hulk
- Knight Rider
- Lost
- Magnum, P.I.
- Miami Vice
- Mickey Spillane's Mike Hammer
- No Ordinary Family
- Once Upon A Time
- Quantum Leap
- Quincy, M.E.
- Riptide
- Rizzoli & Isles
- The Rockford Files
- Simon & Simon
- The Six Million Dollar Man
- The Sopranos
- Stargate Atlantis
- Starsky & Hutch
- Suits
- S.W.A.T. (1975 TV series)
- Terminator: The Sarah Connor Chronicles
- T.J. Hooker
- V.I.P.
- The Virginian
- Wagon Train
- Warehouse 13
- Xena: Warrior Princess

==== Documentary ====
- Air Crash Investigations
- America's Hardest Prisons
- Bogan Hunters
- Dream Car Garage
- Trapped
- Verminators

==== Light entertainment ====
- Hook, Line and Sinker
- Kinne
- Last Comic Standing
- ScreenPLAY
- What Went Down
- World's Craziest Fools

==== News and current affairs ====
- NBC Meet the Press
- NBC Today

==== Reality ====
- The Amazing Race
- America's Toughest Jobs
- Auction Kings
- Aussie Pickers
- Gene Simmons Family Jewels
- Is It Real?
- Jail
- Jersey Shore
- Mounted in Alaska
- Operation Repo
- Pawn Stars Australia
- Pimp My Ride
- Punk'd
- Wipeout USA (season 2-3)

==== Sport ====
- Commonwealth Games
- Rollin' Thunder
- Shannons Legends of Motorsport
- SportsFan Clubhouse
- Summer Olympic Games
- Winter Olympic Games
- WWE Afterburn
- X Games Sydney (2018)

==== Other ====
- Bid America
- Big!
- Building The Ultimate
- Car Crash TV
- D.E.A
- Jetpack Nation
- The Kingdom
- Motor Mate
- NWA: On Fire
- Project Xtreme
- Robot Wars
- Selling Big
- Style in Steel
- Turtleman
- Ultimate Sprintcar
- Zoom TV

=== News ===
7mate airs Seven News updates that air on the main Seven channel and from 7two. All national news updates are across any state.

=== Sport ===
It was announced on 28 April 2011 that, from 2012 to 2016, 7mate would air a minimum of four live AFL matches each round into the NSW/ACT and Queensland markets, thus going head-to-head with the Nine Network's NRL live coverage on Friday nights.

7mate televises live AFL coverage into New South Wales and Queensland, where rugby league is the more dominant sport, and Western Australia, due to the time difference. Some matches may be televised after midnight, or not shown at all, as the current AFL contract requires the local teams (i.e. Sydney Swans/Greater Western Sydney Giants, Brisbane Lions/Gold Coast Suns and West Coast Eagles/Fremantle Dockers) to be televised live (or, in the case of Western Australia, on a three-hour delay) into their respective states. 7mate was also the exclusive broadcaster of the International Rules Series to Australian audiences.

During the AFL season, the Supercars Championship airs on 7mate in Melbourne, Adelaide and Perth if there are AFL matches being televised at the same time.

7mate also exclusively broadcast all matches of the 2013 Rugby League World Cup.

It was announced in November 2013 that 7mate have picked up the rights to televise the Hopman Cup, after Network Ten decided to discontinue its association with the event after three editions.

The 2013–14 LFL Australia season of Legends Football League aired on 7mate.

7mate would broadcast South Australian National Football League games from 2014 as part of the Seven Network's three-year deal to exclusively broadcast the SANFL. After being with the ABC since 1993, this marks the leagues return to commercial television for the first time in 22 years.

On 15 June 2014, it was announced by Reggie Bush on Sunrise that the Seven Network had agreed to a five-year deal to broadcast the NFL. That deal was extended for another three years in 2022.

Since 2015, 7mate has been used to continue Seven's coverage of sport when the main Seven channel breaks for its nightly news bulletin such as with the Australian Open tennis (until 2018) or cricket (from 2019).

In August 2016, 7mate broadcast the 2016 Summer Olympics from Rio de Janeiro.

In April 2018, 7mate broadcast the 2018 Commonwealth Games from the Gold Coast.

Seven, and by extension 7mate, is the new free-to-air home of cricket in Australia in conjunction with Foxtel. This ended Nine's famous 45-year run as the exclusive Cricket broadcaster and also this ended Ten's famous 5-year run as the exclusive Big Bash League broadcaster. The network will televise all Men's international tests matches, 43 Big Bash League Matches, all women's Internationals and 23 Women's Big Bash League Matches. The six-year deal starts in 2018/19 and runs until 2023/24.

In 2021, 7mate broadcast the 2020 Summer Olympics from Tokyo.

== Availability ==
7mate is available in standard definition in metropolitan areas through Seven Network owned-and-operated stations: ATN Sydney, HSV Melbourne, BTQ Brisbane, SAS Adelaide and TVW Perth. Additionally in Sydney, Brisbane and Perth, 7mate is simulcast in high definition via breakaway programming for the AFL on 7HD. Seven-owned STQ Queensland broadcasts 7mate in HD only as it does not carry 7mate in SD.

Seven’s owned and operated regional TV stations continue to broadcast 7mate as a standalone multichannel in high definition; GWN7 (now merged with Seven) in regional and remote areas of Western Australia, where 7mate is broadcast on logical channel number 63. QQQ in Remote Eastern & Central Australia also broadcasts 7mate as a standalone multichannel in high definition on channel 70. Prime7 (now merged with Seven) in most regional areas of NSW/ACT, Victoria and the Gold Coast Region of Queensland has broadcast 7mate in standard definition on channel 63 since launching 7HD on channel 60. Seven also broadcasts 7mate in standard definition through GTS/BKN Spencer Gulf/Broken Hill on channel 63, TNT Tasmania and TND Darwin on channel 73 since launching 7HD on channel 60 and 70 respectively.

=== 7mate HD ===
A full-time high definition simulcast of 7mate launched on 16 January 2020. The service broadcasts in 1080i HD in a MPEG-4 format on digital channel 74, replacing the previously closed 7food network. The channel is available on the Seven Network's owned-and-operated stations, ATN Sydney, HSV Melbourne, BTQ Brisbane, SAS Adelaide, TVW Perth, STQ Queensland, CBN Canberra & Southern NSW, AMV Victoria & NEN Northern NSW.

== Logo and identity history ==
Following the launch, the logo used the generic Seven logo in a blue colour scheme, with the word "mate" being added next to it and a black outline was also included as well.

On 10 July 2020, just 15 days before 7's multichannel rebrand, 7mate unveiled their new logo for the first time since the channel begin transmission in 2010. The outlining from the logo was removed and the word "mate" is now in a different font.

25 September 2010 – 9 July 2020

10 May 2016 – 16 December 2016
16 January 2020 – 9 July 2020

10 July 2020 – present

== Slogans ==
- 2010–2016: Man's Best Friend
- 2010–present: Maaaaaaattttteee
- 2016–present: The Best Channel in The World Ever.

== See also ==
- List of digital television channels in Australia
