= 7Bravo =

Australian television channel

- Logo used since 2024
- Type: American television
- Country: Australia
- Broadcast area: Sydney, Melbourne, Brisbane, Adelaide, Perth, Regional QLD, Regional VIC, Northern NSW, Southern NSW & ACT, Mildura
- Network: Seven Network

Programming
- Language: English
- Picture format: 1080i HDTV

Ownership
- Owner: Seven Media Group
- Sister channels: Channel 7; 7HD; 7two 7mate 7flix TVSN; Racing.com

History
- Launched: 15 January 2023; 3 years ago
- Replaced: Openshop (DTV channel space)

Links
- Website: 7plus.com.au

Availability

Terrestrial
- Freeview Seven owned (virtual): 75/65
- Freeview Seven Regional (virtual): 65

Streaming media
- 7plus: 7Bravo

7Bravo is an Australian free-to-air digital television multichannel, which was launched by the Seven Network under license from NBCUniversal International Networks on 15 January 2023. The channel contains programming from NBCUniversal's American networks, including Bravo, E! and Oxygen, along with entertainment and talk show programming from NBC and its American broadcast syndication division.

== History ==
On 25 October 2022, it was announced that Seven would be launching a new channel, 7Bravo, on 15 January 2023, featuring content from NBCUniversal, timing with the announcement of the wind-down of Foxtel's domestic version of E! on 31 January 2023 at the end of their NBCU output deal. On 30 November 2022, a blank channel appeared on the Seven multiplex. It remained a dark screen until 14 December, when it carried a still with the channel's logo for a month. A lead-up video loop aired on 14 January, promoting the channel's launch the next day, which began with a marathon of the latest season of Million Dollar Listing New York.

== Programming ==
Programs aired on 7Bravo are mix of programs from NBCUniversal's channels including E!, Oxygen, NBC, and Bravo, many making their domestic Australian terrestrial premieres; many have been already available through streaming services or on pay-TV services like Foxtel.

Some of the shows aired on the channel include Million Dollar Listing New York, The Real Housewives of New Jersey, The Kelly Clarkson Show, The Tonight Show Starring Jimmy Fallon, Judge Jerry, Below Deck, and Botched. No library content from Seven or its sister services is currently a part of the network's schedule.

Programs making their free-to-air debut include Dinner Date, Top Chef and Saturday Night Live returning to free-to-air for the first time in many years after decades on Foxtel.

=== Current programming ===
- 911 Crisis Center
- Below Deck
- Below Deck Down Under
- Botched
- Buried in the Backyard
- Dinner Date
- Exhumed
- Get a Room with Carson & Thom
- Hollywood Medium With Tyler Henry
- Judge Jerry
- The Kelly Clarkson Show
- Killer Couples
- Made in Chelsea
- Million Dollar Listing New York
- Real Girlfriends in Paris
- The Real Housewives of Dubai
- The Real Housewives of New Jersey
- The Real Housewives of New York City
- The Real Housewives of Orange County
- The Real Housewives Ultimate Girls Trip
- Relative Success with Tabatha
- Saturday Night Live
- Songland
- The Tonight Show Starring Jimmy Fallon
- Top Chef

== Logo and identity history ==
7Bravo began transmission on 15 January 2023 and contains all programming from NBCUniversal's channels, which included the branding associated with NBCUniversal's own Bravo network. Upon its inception, the logo adopted the standard logo of the Seven Network, with the red 7 ribbon now turquoise, accompanying the "bravo" speech bubble branding.

In April 2024, Seven updated the channel's logo, to reflect the Bravo network refresh which coincided with a rebrand worldwide. Instead of the solid turquoise colour, it featured a lilac-blue gradient.

15 January 2023 – 1 April 2024

1 April 2024 – present

== Availability ==
Nearly all Seven-owned stations such as ATN Sydney, HSV Melbourne, BTQ Brisbane, SAS Adelaide, TVW Perth, STQ Queensland and NEN northern New South Wales/Gold Coast, CBN southern New South Wales/ACT, AMV Victoria and PTV Mildura/Sunraysia carry the network as part of their multiplex, though Seven Regional WA, Seven Regional Australia and WIN Television do not, rendering it a pay-TV-only offering in those areas.

== See also ==
- List of digital television channels in Australia
