= 7plus =

Australian video-on-demand platform

- Website type: Video on demand, OTT, Catch up, live streaming
- Predecessor: PLUS7 (2010–17)
- Headquarters: Eveleigh, New South Wales, Australia
- Area served: Australia
- Owner: Seven Media Group
- Services: streaming service
- Website: 7plus.com.au
- Commercial: Yes
- Registration: Free
- Launched: 27 November 2017; 8 years ago
- Current status: Active

7plus (also stylised as 7+) is a video on demand, catch-up TV service run by the Seven Network. The service became available on 27 November 2017. 7plus also offers online live streaming of Channel 7, 7two, 7mate, 7Bravo, 7flix, Racing.com and 7Sport.

7plus is available across several platforms including Web, iOS and Android apps, FreeviewPlus certified TVs, Apple TV 4th Gen+, Fetch TV, Telstra TV, Chromecast, Android TV, Samsung TV, Sony Linux TV, PlayStation 4 and PlayStation 5.

== History ==
=== 2010–2017: PLUS7 ===
PLUS7 was a catch up TV service run by the Seven Network through its Yahoo7 joint venture with Yahoo!. The service became available on 18 January 2010.

Some titles were exclusively available in Australia on PLUS7, including Other Space and Sin City Saints, as well as the British version of My Kitchen Rules, which were not broadcast on the Seven Network. In 2014, PLUS7 became the first commercial television catch-up service to provide optional closed captioning on most of its programming.

On 3 November 2015, PLUS7 launched a live streaming service called 7Live in time for Melbourne Cup day. In December 2015, 7live added Channel 7 digital channels, 7two and 7mate.

PLUS7 was available across several platforms including iOS mobile operating systems (e.g. iPhone, iPad & iPod Touch), Apple TV, Xbox One, PlayStation 3, PlayStation 4, Windows 10, Sony internet-enabled TVs & Blu-ray players, LG internet-enabled TVs, Samsung internet-enabled TVs & Blu-ray players, Panasonic internet-enabled TVs, Hisense internet-enabled TVs, Humax set top boxes, Windows Mobile 7 & 8 and Samsung devices running Android OS 4.0+ and above.

=== 2017–present: 7plus ===
Following the acquisition of Yahoo! by Verizon Communications in June 2017, Seven announced plans to launch a wholly owned standalone service to replace PLUS7 within the following six months. In September 2017, Seven announced the new service would be known as 7plus and would launch in November 2017. With the introduction of 7plus, PLUS7 was shut down, becoming unavailable on most platforms from 12 December 2017, and on remaining devices on 31 March 2018.

In March 2019, the service added two American-based linear channels, Pac-12 Network and Outdoor Channel, as well as on-demand offerings from these providers.

On 23 July 2020, 7plus introduced a new logo styled as 7+.

On 4 August 2022, 7plus began airing Heartbreak Island, a reality television competition/contest, being deemed "too hot for TV".

== Content and programming ==
7plus provides on-demand access to almost all the TV programs that are broadcast on the Seven Network linear broadcast channels (Channel 7, 7two, 7mate, 7Bravo and 7flix).

Programs are categorised by these genres:

- Drama
- Reality
- Mystery & Crime
- Sci-Fi & Fantasy
- Comedy
- Documentary
- Entertainment
- Food & Cooking
- Lifestyle
- Travel
- Movies
- News
- Sport
- Kids

=== Live Sports ===
- AFL (2025–present)
- Hockey One (2023–present)
- Hockeyroos Matches (2023–present)
- Kookaburras Matches (2023–present)
- Men's Oceania Cup (2023–present)
- Women's Oceania Cup (2023–present)

== Availability ==
Through the streaming platform, 7plus provides access to the whole Seven Network suite of channels, including the main and multi-channels.

As of April 2025, the following online only channels are also available:

- 7now
- 7AFL
- 7Cricket
- Ausbiz
- TVSN
- Bloomberg Television
- Bloomberg Quicktake
- Blue Light (Crime reality programming)
- Dust
- Fuel TV
- LIV Golf
- Love Nature
- All Star Cinema
- Movie Sphere
- MyTime Movie Network
- Haunt TV
- Outdoor Channel
- Pac-12 Network
- PeopleTV
- Stingray Naturescape
- Wicked Tuna
- Rialto Channel

There are also a number of virtual channels based on programming from Seven:

- 7Spotlight
- A Country Practice
- All Saints
- Australian Drama
- Better Homes & Gardens
- Big Brother
- Blue Heelers
- Bondi Vet
- Border Security
- Cooking Culture
- Crazy in Love
- Fail Army
- Farmer Wants a Wife
- Global Champions Replays
- Hell's Kitchen
- Home and Away Classics
- Medical & Rescue
- MKR
- Nashville
- Property Dreams
- SAS Australia
- Supercars Replays
- This Week on 7 AFL
- Travel Australia
- Winners and Losers
- WSL

== Logos ==
PLUS7 logo (18 January 2010 – 27 November 2017)

7plus logo (27 November 2017 – 23 July 2020)

7+ logo (23 July 2020 – present)

== Slogans ==
- 2020–2022: Discover Something New
- 2022–present: Stream Big

== See also ==
- Internet television in Australia
- List of streaming media services
