= 7food network =

Former Australian television channel

- Country: Australia
- Broadcast area: Sydney, Melbourne, Brisbane, Adelaide, Perth, Regional QLD
- Network: Seven Network

Programming
- Language: English
- Picture format: 576i (SDTV) 16:9

Ownership
- Owner: Seven West Media
- Sister channels: Seven; 7two 7mate Openshop; 7flix Racing.com

History
- Launched: 1 December 2018; 7 years ago
- Replaced: 4ME
- Closed: 28 December 2019; 6 years ago
- Replaced by: HD simulcast of 7mate

Availability (at time of closure)

Terrestrial
- Freeview Seven owned (virtual): Channel 74/64

7food network was a short-lived Australian free-to-air television channel owned by the Seven Network which launched on 1 December 2018. The channel marked the start of Seven's new deal with Discovery, Inc., immediately after the end of SBS's previous deal with Discovery which saw the creation of SBS Food (formerly Food Network) in 2015. The channel was a hybrid of the Seven Network and the Food Network, and featured shows about food and cooking from around the world.

The channel ceased broadcasting on 28 December 2019 after garnering lower than expected ratings, and was eventually replaced with a HD simulcast of 7mate on 16 January 2020.

== History ==
On 27 September 2018, SBS announced they would not renew their brand licensing and programming deal with Discovery Inc. ending on 17 November 2018. Their version of the Food Network channel would be rebranded SBS Food, and focus on domestic Australian culinary programming rather than the Food Network's increasingly food-focused reality television and competition programming. On 26 October 2018, Seven announced they had signed their own deal with Discovery Inc. to carry a new domestic version of Food Network launching in December 2018 on channel 74. It would have a similar format to SBS's version, showing a mixture of locally produced cooking shows (including reality-based programs such as My Kitchen Rules) and Scripps-produced American cooking programs.

On 29 October 2018, Seven stated they expected good ratings for the channel and also announced airings of international versions of shows like My Kitchen Rules. On 2 November 2018, the channel was activated, then a 'coming soon' card appeared on 6 November, before a promotional loop appeared on 27 November. On 1 December 2018, the channel was launched at 6:00am with Guy's Grocery Games.

On 24 October 2019, it was announced that the channel would be closed due to disappointing ratings, with none of its planned domestic cooking programming coming to air. The channel switched to a placeholder showing that the HD feed of 7mate would relaunch on 16 January 2020. Food Network content continued to air as a part of the schedule of 7flix from 29 December 2019.

== Programming ==
The channel aired imports from Food Network including Guy's Grocery Games, Food Network Star, Chopped, Restaurant: Impossible, Diners, Drive-Ins and Dives, Cutthroat Kitchen, Iron Chef America, Best Baker in America, Spring Baking Championship, Kids Baking Championship and Ridiculous Cakes, as well as locally produced shows that were originally shown on the Seven network including My Kitchen Rules, Better Homes and Gardens, Zumbo's Just Desserts, Fast Ed's Fast Food, Anh Does Vietnam, My France with Manu, Around the World with Manu, Manu's American Road Trip, My Ireland with Colin and Aussie Barbecue Heroes.

== Availability ==
7food network was available in standard definition digital in metropolitan areas and regional Queensland through Seven Network owned-and-operated stations including ATN Sydney, HSV Melbourne, BTQ Brisbane, SAS Adelaide, TVW Perth and STQ Queensland. Regional affiliates Prime7/GWN7, SCA Seven and WIN Television and pay TV service Foxtel did not launch the channel, nor did they announce any intention to carry 7food network.

== See also ==
- Lifestyle Food
- SBS Food
