= 2023 FIFA Women's World Cup broadcasting rights =

The 2023 FIFA Women's World Cup was a football tournament taking place in July and August 2023 involving 32 women's national teams from nations affiliated to the International Federation of Association Football (FIFA). The tournament was broadcast all over the world.

The 2023 Women's World Cup was the first Women's World Cup to have its broadcasting rights sold as a standalone product rather than being packaged as a bonus of purchasing broadcasting rights for the Men's World Cup. FIFA stated that it saw "huge interest" in the separate bidding process and hoped for more regional partners to sign on. FIFA set an aim to reach a global audience of 2 billion, up from 1.12 billion at the previous edition in France. After receiving low bids from the "big five" (United Kingdom, France, Germany, Italy, Spain), FIFA threatened a media blackout for these countries. FIFA itself was also criticized for its previously bundled deals which did not attribute a fair proportion back to the women's game, since FIFA had consistently undervalued all aspects of the women's tournament across its existence, such as in merchandising and branding.

== Controversy ==
=== Bid rejections ===
In October 2022, FIFA rejected multiple bids from various public and private broadcasters for what it described as significantly under-priced bids, urging broadcasters to bid more and saying it is what the women's game deserves. Romy Gai, FIFA's Chief Business Officer, called on broadcasters to seize the "opportunity" presented by the women's game, further saying that these bids did not reflect the popularity of women's football by noting the record viewership figures of the 2019 Women's World Cup.

During a FIFA Council meeting, FIFA president Gianni Infantino also expressed his disappointment towards broadcasters offering "100 times less" compared to the men's tournament, claiming that the women's game is exponentially growing with similar viewership figures as the men's, and asked that the market be willing to consider higher bids for the broadcast rights for the tournament. Some European broadcasters were concerned about the timezone difference affecting viewership figures, something that was not an issue with the France-hosted 2019 Women's World Cup.

In May 2023, Infantino threatened a media blackout for Europe's "big five" (United Kingdom, France, Germany, Italy, Spain) if they did not offer more; the "big five" earn much more in sport revenue and in broadcasting sport compared to the rest of the world. He also reiterated the claims of broadcasters offering low figures; reports claimed the Italian bid was as low as €300,000 (they paid €160 million for rights to the 2022 men's tournament), and that the BBC–ITV broadcast partnership in the UK offered around €9 million, about 8% of the figure for the 2022 men's tournament.

FIFA conceded that a deal with British broadcasters was not far off, with Channel 4 also suggested as a possible broadcaster for the UK. British media reported that having no broadcast deal so close to the start of the tournament – none of the "big five" had secured rights before June, with the tournament set to start in July – was a negative for all parties involved. Sports ministers from the "big five" had released a joint statement on 31 May, acknowledging difficulties in securing rights while saying that FIFA and broadcasters were in discussion towards agreement at the time. Besides being major markets in undesirable timezones, the deals were made more difficult as the Women's World Cup is a Listed Event (deemed of particular national interest) in these countries, with special regulations on how it can be broadcast. In the UK, having a broadcast partnership of two companies also complicated the deal further.

On 15 June, broadcasting deals (with national free-to-air broadcasters) for all of the "big five" were formally announced, as was the separate expansion of the Eurovision Sport deal to cover these territories as well as Ukraine, and for promotion of the tournament across Europe.

British regulator Ofcom announced on 4 July that the BBC–ITV deal for rights was not actually complete, but the broadcasters had applied for permission to show the tournament under the Ofcom Code on Sports and Other Listed and Designated Events, as waiting any longer would be too late; Ofcom already had to shorten their consultation period so that they could approve the broadcast before the tournament was set to begin.

With the European deals, Japan was the only major market to have no official broadcaster by mid-June; on the day the "big five" deals were announced, Gai commented that Japanese broadcasters still failed to make a sufficient offer despite Japan being in a more convenient timezone. Broadcasters Fuji Television and NHK, who had held the rights to the 2019 tournament, had not commented on the potential blackout as of 19 June 2023, a month before the start of the tournament. Criticism of the high costs for sports rights on Japanese terrestrial TV had been a theme since the sale of 2022 FIFA World Cup broadcasting rights.

On 13 July 2023, a week before the tournament, NHK announced that it would broadcast the three group-stage matches featuring Japan. The deal would include knockout-stage matches should Japan advance. Matches would be broadcast on the BS1 satellite TV channel, except for Japan's final group-stage match against Spain, which would be broadcast on terrestrial channel NHK-G.

=== FIFA backlash ===
After Infantino had said that comparatively low broadcasting rights bids for the tournament from the "big five" countries was an insult to "all women worldwide", and that FIFA had a "moral and legal obligation" to demand more money, he and FIFA were faced with criticism for causing the issue themselves and then lecturing on it. Former FIFA Council member Moya Dodd said that FIFA had no place to say the broadcasting rights for the Women's World Cup were worth more when the rights had previously been bundled with the men's World Cup, but the combined bid values were attributed by FIFA entirely for the men's tournament and distributed entirely within the men's game. The New Yorker said that Infantino's attempt to frame his and FIFA's cynicism as a moral stand was "a sort of perversion of the players' demands for equal pay".

Ricardo Fort, who has worked with sponsorship partners, also said that the bid value was not the issue and cited how FIFA distributed such revenue as the root cause; he said that partners had long called on FIFA to unbundle the rights and also to separate revenue 50-50 between the men's and women's games. Dodd said that FIFA should review its bundled deals and attribute a fair proportion back to the women's game instead of blackmail broadcasters. Women's football journalist Suzanne Wrack noted in a column for The Guardian that FIFA's requests came during a period of economic hardship for broadcasters, as they had to cut services and salaries, and that FIFA had consistently undervalued all aspects of the women's tournament across its existence, such as in merchandising and branding.

Dave Roberts, who has worked with FIFA's in-house streaming broadcaster FIFA+, was among the figures to suggest that FIFA created the problem so that they could exclusively broadcast the tournament in the "big five" countries themselves, with "potential for strategic digital partnerships". Glen Killane, Executive Director of Eurovision Sport, which holds the rights to broadcast the tournament in many European markets, blamed FIFA for not creating a dialogue with broadcasters on the planned direction of growth for women's football. Former player Rebecca Sowden agreed, saying that FIFA restricting broadcast in the biggest markets would be worse for the women's game, as it disrupts the ecosystem of fans, and that without FIFA working to demonstrate interest in women's football all the time, European broadcasters should be wary about limited exposure and off-peak timezones.

FIFA had originally tendered for bids for broadcasting rights in June and July 2022, and had not expressed dissatisfaction with these bids until May 2023, almost a year later and shortly before the tournament was set to begin. Ofcom wrote that late rights acquisition was not the fault of broadcasters.

=== In Australia ===
In Australia, FIFA sold broadcasting rights to the entire event to Optus Sport in June 2021 In October 2022, rights to 15 games were sold to Seven Network. These games included four round of 16 games, two quarter-finals, the semi-finals, and the final, along with all of the Matildas games. This raised public criticism, with many arguing that the entire tournament should have been sold by FIFA in a way which ensured it was free-to-air, as the 2022 (men's) World Cup in Qatar was on the SBS. In comparison to the men's tournament the women's tournament is not on Australia's anti-siphoning list which enables free-to-air networks greater ability to gain rights to events on the list.

== Broadcasters ==
Territory	Rights holder(s)	Ref.
Worldwide	FIFA+ (excluding some nations, produced by different partners); Sport 24 (in-flight and on-board)	
Albania^{EBU}	RTSH	
Argentina	TVP; DirecTV Sports	
Australia	Optus Sport; Seven Network	
Austria^{EBU}	ORF	
Bangladesh	T Sports (Pay TV and online); GTV (Pay TV); Bangladesh Television (Free TV; semi-finals and final only); iScreen (online); (licensed from 1Stadia)	
Belgium^{EBU}	RTBF; VRT	
Bosnia and Herzegovina^{EBU}	Arena Sport; BHRT	
Brazil	Grupo Globo; CazéTV	
Bulgaria^{EBU}	BNT	
Canada	Bell Media	
Caribbean	DirecTV Sports (Spanish Regions only)	
Caucasus	Setanta Sports	
Central Asia	Setanta Sports	
China	CCTV; Shinai Sports; Migu	
Colombia	DirecTV Sports; Caracol TV; RCN Televisión	
Costa Rica	Teletica	
Croatia^{EBU}	Arena Sport; HRT	
Cyprus^{EBU}	CyBC; ANT1	
Czech Republic^{EBU}	ČT; TV Nova	
Denmark	Viaplay Group	
Ecuador	DirecTV Sports; Teleamazonas	
Estonia^{EBU}	ERR	
Fiji	FBC	
Finland	Yle	
France^{EBU}	France Télévisions; Groupe M6	
Georgia^{EBU}	GPB	
Germany^{EBU}	ARD; ZDF	
Greece	ANT1	
Guatemala	Tigo Sports	
Hong Kong	PCCW	
Honduras	Tigo Sports	
Hungary^{EBU}	MTVA	
Iceland^{EBU}	RÚV	
Indian subcontinent	1stadia	
India	Doordarshan; FanCode	
Ireland^{EBU}	RTÉ	
Israel	Sports Channel	
Italy^{EBU}	RAI	
Jamaica	Television Jamaica	
Japan	NHK	
Kosovo^{EBU}	Arena Sport; RTK	
Latvia^{EBU}	LTV	
Liechtenstein^{EBU}	EBU	
Lithuania^{EBU}	LRT	
Luxembourg^{EBU}	RTBF; VRT	
Maldives	MediaNet	
Malta^{EBU}	PBS	
MENA	beIN Sports	
Mexico	TUDN; VIX	
Moldova^{EBU}	TRM; Setanta Sports	
Montenegro^{EBU}	Arena Sport; RTCG	
Mozambique	Miramar	
Namibia	Namibian Broadcasting Corporation	
Netherlands	NOS	
New Zealand	Prime; Sky; Stuff	
Nigeria	AfroSport	
North Korea	KBS; MBC; SBS	
North Macedonia^{EBU}	Arena Sport; MRT	
Norway	Viaplay Group; NRK	
Pacific Islands	Digicel; Pacific Cooperation Broadcasting Limited	
Panama	Tigo Sports; RPC; TVN	
Papua New Guinea	NBC	
Paraguay	TyC Sports	
Peru	DirecTV Sports; Grupo ATV	
Philippines	Cignal TV; One Sports	
Poland	Viaplay Group	
Portugal	Sport TV; RTP	
Puerto Rico	Fox; Telemundo	
Romania^{EBU}	TVR	
Serbia^{EBU}	Arena Sport; RTS	
Singapore	Mediacorp; Singtel; StarHub	
Slovakia^{EBU}	RTVS; TV Nova	
Slovenia^{EBU}	Arena Sport; RTVSLO	
South Africa	SABC; SuperSport	
South Korea	KBS; MBC; SBS	
Spain^{EBU}	RTVE	
Sub-Saharan Africa	New World TV; SuperSport	
Sweden	Viaplay Group	
Switzerland^{EBU}	SRG SSR	
Taiwan	ELTA Sports	
Turkey^{EBU}	TRT	
Ukraine^{EBU}	Suspilne	
United Kingdom^{EBU}	BBC; ITV	
United States	Fox; Telemundo	
Uruguay	TyC Sports	
Venezuela	Televen; DirecTV Sports	
Vietnam	VTVcab, Truyền Hình Quốc Hội Việt Nam (National Assembly of Vietnam TV), VMG Media	
Zambia	ZNBC	

== Notes ==
^EBU- FIFA and EBU has made an agreement for 34 territories.
