= Rollin' Thunder (TV series) =

- Also known as: Australian Bowling Cup
- Genre: Sport
- Country of origin: Australia
- Original language: English
- No. of seasons: 2
- No. of episodes: 15

Production
- Producer: one80 Digital Post
- Production locations: Melbourne, Victoria (2018); Sydney, New South Wales (2017)
- Camera setup: Multi-camera
- Running time: 60 minutes (including commercials)

Original release
- Network: 7mate (2017-2018); Fox Sports (2018-present)
- Release: 3 December 2017 – present

Rollin' Thunder is an Australian television show currently broadcast on Fox Sports. The program showcases matches from The Australian Bowling Cup, a newly developed ten-pin bowling tournament held at Oz Tenpin Epping in Melbourne, Australia. Featuring two matches per episode, the tournament will showcase 18 of Australia's best bowlers in a baker style triples format which will see both female and male bowlers feature in six teams, culminating in the grand final to determine the overall winners.

The debut season aired from December 2017 on the free-to-air channel 7mate, with teammates George Frilingos and Jarrod Langford winning the inaugural event.

The second season aired over a two-week period from 10 December 2018 on Fox Sports channel 506.

== 2017 Tournament ==
The inaugural tournament in 2017 was recorded on 14 October 2017 at Tenpin City Lidcombe in Sydney, Australia, and premiered on 7mate on Sunday 3 December 2017. Sixteen bowlers competed in the event, who were separated into eight teams of two people. Teams were then split into two even pools, which resulted in each team playing three matches in the qualifying rounds. The 2017 tournament aired across seven episodes, with each episode featuring two matches.

The series reached over 694,000 viewers in metropolitan and regional TV markets over its seven-week run. The show was presented by Peter Psaltis, who commentated alongside Paul Delany and Daniel Webb, with guest commentary appearances from Jason Belmonte.

The following teams were named:

Pool A	Pool B
Jason Belmonte & Sam Cooley; David Porto & Matt Riley; Rebecca Voukolos & Emma Walsh; Blayne Fletcher & Sean Bowling	George Frilingos & Jarrod Langford; Bec Whiting & Bec Martin; Glen Loader & Lachlan Merchant; Ashley Warren & Chris Castle

=== Season 1 (2017) ===
Note: Winners are listed in bold and ties are listed in italics, with game scores listed in brackets

Episode No.	Airdate	Matches
1	3 December 2017	Match 1: **David Porto & Matt Riley (206)** vs. Rebecca Voukolos & Emma Walsh (193); Match 2: Jason Belmonte & Sam Cooley (182) vs. **Blayne Fletcher & Sean Bowling (197)**
2	10 December 2017	Match 3: **George Frilingos & Jarrod Langford (183)** vs. Ashley Warren & Chris Castle (182); Match 4: Glen Loader & Lachlan Merchant (224) vs. **Bec Whiting & Bec Martin (237)**
3	17 December 2017	Match 5: Jason Belmonte & Sam Cooley (172) vs. **Rebecca Voukolos & Emma Walsh (177)**; Match 6: Blayne Fletcher & Sean Bowling (192) vs. David Porto & Matt Riley (192)
4	24 December 2017	Match 7: Bec Whiting & Bec Martin (188) vs. **Ashley Warren & Chris Castle (192)**; Match 8: **George Frilingos & Jarrod Langford (206)** vs. Glen Loader & Lachlan Merchant (174)
5	31 December 2017	Match 9: Jason Belmonte & Sam Cooley (203) vs. **David Porto & Matt Riley (242)**; Match 10: **Blayne Fletcher & Sean Bowling (176)** vs. Rebecca Voukolos & Emma Walsh (169)
6	21 January 2018	Match 11: **George Frilingos & Jarrod Langford (235)** vs. Bec Whiting & Bec Martin (181); Match 12: Glen Loader & Lachlan Merchant (184) vs. **Ashley Warren & Chris Castle (190)**
7	28 January 2018	Grand Final: David Porto & Matt Riley (204) vs. **George Frilingos & Jarrod Langford (236)**

== 2018 Tournament ==
The 2018 tournament was recorded on 10 November 2018 at Oz Tenpin Epping in Melbourne, Australia, and is premiered on Fox Sports from 10 December 2018. Eighteen bowlers competed in the event, after being separated into six teams of three people, each representing an Australian state and bowling centre.

The show was presented by Peter Psaltis, with expert commentary from Chris Commane and Jeanette Baker.

The following teams were named:

Team name	Bowlers	Team Sponsor
NSW Hot Shots	Jason Belmonte (Captain), Bec Martin, Blayne Fletcher	Orange Tenpin Bowl
QLD Rollin' Thunder	George Frilingos (Captain), Alexia Hicks, Jarrod Langford	Caboolture Bowl
VIC All Stars	Adam Hayes (Captain), Dena Buxton, Terry Wenban	Wyncity Morwell
NT Cyclone	Rebecca Voukolos (Captain), Matt Clague, Shaun Dunn	Planet Tenpin
NSW Strike	Glen Loader (Captain), Min Hee Kym, Jordan Dinham	Tenpin City
VIC Kingpins	David Porto (Captain), Jayden Panella, Nick Davis	Wyncity Point Cook

=== Season 2 (2018) ===
Note: Winners are listed in bold, with game scores listed in brackets

Episode No.	Airdate	Matches
1	10 December 2018	Match 1: NSW Strike (180) vs. **NT Cyclone (237)**; Match 2: VIC Kingpins (212) vs. **NSW Hot Shots (227)**
2	11 December 2018	Match 3: VIC All Stars (175) vs. **QLD Rollin' Thunder (233)**; Match 4: NSW Hot Shots (208) vs. **NT Cyclone (214)**
3	12 December 2018	Match 5: **NSW Strike (247)** vs. VIC All Stars (231); Match 6: **VIC Kingpins (229)** vs. QLD Rollin' Thunder (202)
4	13 December 2018	Match 7: **VIC All Stars (235)** vs. NSW Hot Shots (192); Match 8: NSW Strike (191) vs. **QLD Rollin' Thunder (193)**
5	17 December 2018	Match 9: **VIC Kingpins (199)** vs. NT Cyclone (185); Match 10: NSW Hot Shots (242) vs. **QLD Rollin' Thunder (265)**
6	18 December 2018	Match 11: **VIC All Stars (256)** vs. NT Cyclone (177); Match 12: VIC Kingpins (196) vs. **NSW Strike (216)**
7	19 December 2018	Knockout Final: VIC Kingpins (190) vs. **NSW Strike (215)**; Qualifying Final: VIC All Stars (232) vs. **QLD Rollin' Thunder (269)**
8	20 December 2018	Preliminary Final: **VIC All Stars (206)** vs. NSW Strike (204); Grand Final: QLD Rollin' Thunder (185) vs. **VIC All Stars (203)**

== See also ==
- List of Australian television series
