= The Mentor (TV series) =

- Presented by: Mark Bouris
- Country of origin: Australia
- Original language: English
- No. of seasons: 1
- No. of episodes: 8

Production
- Running time: 60 minutes

Original release
- Network: Seven Network
- Release: 23 April 2018

The Mentor is an Australian reality television series that first screened on the Seven Network on 23 April 2018. It features Mark Bouris, the founder and chairman of Wizard Home Loans and Yellow Brick Road, who helps struggling small businesses transform into genuine successes.

The series was announced at Seven's upfronts in October 2017. Applications for the series opened in November 2017 and closed on 15 December 2017.

== Ratings ==
Episode	State	Owner	Business
1	QLD	Sharon	Ubiquitous Realty
2	NSW	Kim	Cronulla Florist
3	VIC	Ron	Cobram Motorcycles and Mowers
4	VIC	Sally & Jo	No Grainer
5	VIC	Mick & Lorena	Pizzaiolo Micheluccio
6	NSW	Jeff & Anna-Elizabeth	Anjeos Hair and Beauty
7	VIC	Eva	Togah
