= Back with the Ex =

- Genre: Reality; Dating
- Country of origin: Australia
- Original language: English
- No. of series: 1
- No. of episodes: 7

Production
- Running time: 60 minutes
- Production company: Seven Studios

Original release
- Network: Seven Network
- Release: 18 April – 30 May 2018

Back with the Ex is an Australian reality television series which premiered on the Seven Network on 18 April 2018. The show features former couples who want to give their relationship a second chance.

The series is distributed on Netflix outside of Australia and released in January 2019.

== Couples ==
Couple		Age	Reason for Break Up	Status
1	Jeremy	28	After dating on and off for seven years, Jeremy eventually called it quits four years ago & moved to London	They came together in the last episode, but have split since.
1	Meg	26	After dating on and off for seven years, Jeremy eventually called it quits four years ago & moved to London	They came together in the last episode, but have split since.
2	Diane	50	The pair enjoyed a long-distance relationship 28 years ago and they will continue to love each other until the end of time	They got engaged in the last episode, but have split since.
2	Peter	57	The pair enjoyed a long-distance relationship 28 years ago and they will continue to love each other until the end of time	They got engaged in the last episode, but have split since.
3	Cam	24	The former high school sweethearts broke up three years ago after Cam found out Kate cheated	After the last episode they moved in together, but have split since.
3	Kate	22	The former high school sweethearts broke up three years ago after Cam found out Kate cheated	After the last episode they moved in together, but have split since.
4	Erik	32	After breaking up repeatedly during their six-year-relationship, Erik finally called it quits via text message six years ago	In the last episode Lauren decided she did not want to be in a relationship with Erik.
4	Lauren	34	After breaking up repeatedly during their six-year-relationship, Erik finally called it quits via text message six years ago	In the last episode Lauren decided she did not want to be in a relationship with Erik.

== Ratings ==
No.	Title	Air date	Timeslot	Overnight ratings		Consolidated ratings		Total viewers	Ref(s)
No.	Title	Air date	Timeslot	Viewers	Rank	Viewers	Rank	Total viewers	Ref(s)
1	Episode 1	18 April 2018	Wednesday 9:00 pm	449,000	17	—N/a	—N/a	449,000	
