= SBS Food =

Australian television channel

- Logo used since 2018
- Country: Australia
- Broadcast area: Nationwide
- Network: SBS Television
- Headquarters: Sydney

Programming
- Language: English
- Picture format: 576i (SDTV) 16:9

Ownership
- Owner: Special Broadcasting Service
- Sister channels: SBS; SBS HD; SBS2; SBS World Movies; NITV

History
- Launched: 17 November 2015; 10 years ago
- Former names: Food Network (2015–2018)

Links
- Website: sbs.com.au/food

Availability

Terrestrial
- Freeview SBS: Channel 33

SBS Food (formerly Food Network) is an Australian free-to-air television channel owned and operated by the Special Broadcasting Service (SBS). The channel airs programs about food and cooking, from cultures around the world.

== History ==
SBS first revealed it would launch a channel dedicated to food on 30 September 2015, following the Australian Government's decision to not permit the public broadcaster to increase the amount of primetime advertising it is allowed to broadcast. It was Australia's first and at the time only free-to-air channel to be dedicated exclusively to food-related programming. It is broadcast 24 hours a day on channel 33, and all programs aired on the channel are also available to stream on SBS on Demand.

The channel began broadcasting as Food Network on 17 November 2015 at 1 pm AEDST, replacing a simulcast of SBS. The channel initially operated under a license from Discovery Inc., the operator of the American channel of the same name. The relationship included a three year programming deal with Discovery which saw numerous Food Network programs on the channel. The first programme shown on the channel was 30 Minute Meals. The channel was first included in the official OzTAM ratings on 1 December 2015, where it recorded a 1.3% primetime share.

On 17 November 2018, the channel changed its name to SBS Food, following the ending of the Discovery Inc. deal, which saw Discovery's American shows (which had increasingly shifted from an instructional to a reality/competition-focused direction) pulled from the channel and replaced with more premium titles, including increased domestic Australian content. Discovery's food shows later shifted to a new free-to-air channel, 7food network, which began broadcasting on 1 December 2018. The move proved disastrous to Seven and Discovery, and after disappointing ratings, 7food network was shut down on 28 December 2019 and its programming dispersed among Seven's other channels, making SBS Food once again the only Australian free-to-air channel dedicated exclusively to food.

SBS Food was converted into a MPEG-4 SD channel on 5 December 2023.

== Logo and identity history ==
17 November 2015 – 17 November 2018

17 November 2018 – present

== See also ==
- 7food network
- Lifestyle Food
