= Anh Does =

- Genre: Travel
- Directed by: Paul Melville
- Presented by: Anh Do
- Country of origin: Australia
- Original language: English
- No. of seasons: 6
- No. of episodes: 10

Production
- Executive producer: Paul Melville
- Running time: 60 minutes
- Production company: Seven Productions

Original release
- Network: Seven Network
- Release: 7 October 2012 – 2015

Anh Does... is a travel and lifestyle show presented by comedian Anh Do on the Seven Network. It premiered in 2012 with the two-part series Anh Does Vietnam, in which he revisited the country of his birth, Vietnam. Anh's family fled from Vietnam to Australia as refugees in 1980.

This series was followed by Anh Does Britain in 2013 where Anh visited Great Britain and Ireland and continued with other destinations.

== Series overview ==
Season	Title	Episodes	Originally aired	
Season	Title	Episodes	Season premiere	Season finale
1	Vietnam	2	7 October 2012	14 October 2012
2	Britain	2	23 July 2013	4 August 2013
3	Scandinavia	1	27 February 2014	
4	Iceland	1	29 June 2014	
5	Brazil	2	7 July 2014	14 July 2014
6	Italy	2	21 July 2015	23 July 2015

== Countries ==
=== Anh Does... Vietnam (2012) ===
Anh traveled the country of Vietnam.

Episode		Air date	Viewers	Rank	Ref
1	Part One	Sunday, 7 October 2012	1.678	#1	
2	Part Two	Sunday, 14 October 2012	1.317	#3	

=== Anh Does... Britain (2013) ===
Anh traveled the country of Britain, including Great Britain & Ireland

Episode No.		Original Australian air date	Overnight viewers		Consolidated viewers		Total viewers	Source
Episode No.		Original Australian air date	Viewers	Rank	Viewers	Rank	Total viewers	Source
1	Part One	Tuesday, 23 July 2013	1,006,000	6	46,000	7	1,052,000	
2	Part Two	Sunday, 4 August 2013	954,000	7	45,000	6	999,000	

=== Anh Does... Scandinavia (2014) ===
Anh traveled the country of Scandinavia, including the countries of Denmark, Sweden & Norway

Episode		Air date	Viewers	Rank	Ref
1	Anh Does Scandinavia	Thursday, 27 February 2014	0.630	#15	

=== Anh Does... Iceland (2014) ===
Anh traveled the country of Iceland.

Episode		Air date	Viewers	Rank	Ref
1	Anh Does Iceland	Sunday, 29 June 2014	0.729	#10	

=== Anh Does... Brazil (2014) ===
Anh traveled the country of Brazil.

Episode		Air date	Viewers	Rank	Ref
1	Part One	Monday, 7 July 2014	0.765	#11	
2	Part Two	Monday, 14 July 2014	0.531	—N/a	

=== Anh Does... Italy (2015) ===
Anh traveled the country of Italy.

Episode		Air date	Viewers	Rank	Ref
1	Part One	Tuesday, 21 July 2015	0.676	#12	
2	Part Two	Thursday, 23 July 2015	0.673	#10	
