= Rebecca Sowden =

New Zealand footballer

Personal information
- Full name: Rebecca Sowden
- Date of birth: 14 September 1981 (age 45)
- Place of birth: New Zealand

International career
Years	Team	Apps	(Gls)
2004–2007	New Zealand	10	(0)

Rebecca Sowden (born 14 September 1981) is an association football player who represented New Zealand at international level.

Sowden made her Football Ferns début in a 0–2 loss to China on 22 February 2004, and finished her international career with 10 caps to her credit.
