= Mounted in Alaska =

- Starring: Russel Knight; Tina Knight; Dave Denslow; Doug Robinson; Sam Cook; Aaron Lawson; Ken Civian
- Country of origin: United States
- Original language: English
- No. of seasons: 1
- No. of episodes: 16 aired

Production
- Production location: Anchorage, Alaska
- Running time: 30 minutes with commercials

Original release
- Network: History Channel
- Release: April 7 – June 23, 2011

Mounted in Alaska is an American reality television show that aired on the History Channel. The series follows the creative works of Knight's Taxidermy, Inc. located Anchorage, Alaska which is owned and operated by Russell Knight. The team focuses on hunting and fishing clientele, sometimes making mounts inside the client's homes. The team also specialize in taxidermy restoration and repair.

== Knight's Taxidermy Staff ==
- Russel "Russ" Knight - Owner
- Kristina "Tina" Knight - Russ's Daughter / Hide Stretcher
- Doug Robinson - Shop Foreman / Shop Manager
- Dave Denslow - "The Fish Guy"; Taxidermist (specializing in Fish) / Carpenter / Mounter
- Sam Cook - "The Cat Man"; Taxidermist (specializing in Big Cats)
- Aaron Lawson - Taxidermist
- Ken Civian - Skinner / Flesher
- Merry Keogh - Secretary
- Dan Mulberry - Maintenance
- Tommy - Shop Finisher
- Jeremiah - Shop Grunt
- Terrence - Shop Intern

== Episodes ==
No.	Title	Original release date
1	"Maneaters"	April 7, 2011
When a client collects an African Lion, Russ challenges the new guy, Billy, to use his taxidermy skills from Mississippi to restore the lion and see if he lives up to the title of "The Cat Man". Later, Russ has to make the world's first King Crab mold to try and salvage an old broken crab for a fisherman despite Doug's pessimistic remarks and Ken's clumsiness.
2	"Growlin' and Howlin'"	April 7, 2011
Russ and the team are tasked with refurbishing a 40-year-old Polar Bear that is mounted in a family restaurant. When Doug almost messes up during the bleaching process, Russ has to work his magic to salvage the mistake. Later, Dave is asked to use the Japanese art of Gyotaku to make a paper print of a large fish for a family reunion, but is Dave ready to mount the fish in a way he's not familiar with.
3	"The End is Rear"	April 14, 2011
Russ is tasked with mounting a deer 25 feet in the air. The process starts out horribly when Sam almost destroys the mount before they hang it. After constant rejections by Tina, Russ makes a decision and agrees to create a replica Appaloosa rear for a client, who has been requesting to mount a horse tail of her dead horse. For getting dragged into Tina's mess, he forces Tina to do the job and prove herself at the shop.
4	"Warts and All"	April 14, 2011
Russ and his team are asked for a very bizarre request when a customer asks them to cut his prized Warthog in half so he can mount the halves as though they are busting through his wall. Later, Aaron is tasked with his first full mount when he's given a coyote mounted in a howling pose, but the client is expecting more than what he sees at the end.
5	"C'antelope"	April 21, 2011
Sam and Russ butt heads over attaining the right look for the shop's first ever gigantic Lord Derby Eland. Aaron has to quickly complete a Himalayan Tahr so Russ can get the finicky client; his good friend, Diamond Dan, off his couch, but Dave complicates things when he screws up the rock molds for the base.
6	"Predator vs. Prey"	April 21, 2011
While Russ is busy setting up for the Safari Club International Taxidermy Competition, Aaron and Sam race against time and compete against each other to complete their mounts in hopes of winning a coveted Blue Ribbon. With only two weeks to go, Sam is asked to completely re-model an entire leopard, while Aaron's client changes his mind about what he wants in the middle of the mounting process.
7	"I Am The Walrus"	April 28, 2011
Russ finds a mystery box on his front steps and must take it to a local hermit and bone carver to make sure the contents are legal. When it's discovered that the owner is a Native Alaskan of the Black Fish Tribe from Emmonak, Russ begins the project of restoring a Walrus Skull for a low price, but realizes the true value of the mount is actually more than what's being charged. Despite Doug's debacle in the Polar Bear restoration, Russ cautiously gives him another chance with the bleach that unfortunately results in multiple fiascos. Meanwhile, Aaron is made team leader of a Double Nyala mount and, against Tina's advice, goes over Russ's head on deciding the final look not realizing that Russ is standing right behind him.
8	"Reindeer Games"	April 28, 2011
Dave develops a crush on Miss Teen Alaska 2005, Sonja Garness, and promises her the impossible -- creating a camel mold from scratch; much to Russ and Doug's dismay. An old friend brings in an 85-pound King Salmon Russ mounted twenty years earlier for a cleaning and requests the "Good Buddy Discount" (GBD), which Russ hasn't done in years. The race is on when Tina proves she's as tough as the guys by competing in the "Running of The Reindeer" -- Alaska's high-octane version of Pamplona.
9	"Bare-ly Alive"	May 5, 2011
Russ races one of his best friends, Lynn Keogh, who is also Merry's husband; snow-mobiling back to the terrifying spot where a Grizzly bear attacked his buddy two years ago. Russ is shocked when Lynn says he's finally ready to mount the grizzly that tried to eat him alive--and wants the real teeth in the mount. And a creepy Alaskan client brings in a creepy box from Africa with one of the most mystical animals alive, the Hyena. True superstitions come out when the gang blames the animal for the run of bad luck that invades the shop that started with Russ's 38-year-old good luck charm disappearing; forcing Russ to create a temporary rabbit's foot, while the staff begin pulling out their own charms and taking caution.
10	"Later Alligator"	May 12, 2011
Russ reaches deep into his past and busts out an alligator that he took with a bow 20 years ago. Russ wants Dave to mount the gator in the ultimate swamp action pose and then trade it away for a surprise from a man in a cabin in the mountains. Sam mounts "Black Death," a Cape Buffalo for a client who was mauled by a bear. Ken puts the new intern, Terrance, to his paces as Russ assigns him to oversee the intern's "right of passage." Sam is furious when he's forced to rebuild the face from scratch after the new shop intern destroys his work.
11	"A Ton of Bull"	May 19, 2011
Max, Russell's good friend and a longtime client, comes for a visit to annoy the shop crew and present them with a Vancouver bull from Hawaii. Aaron takes on the challenge, but can he handle being under Sam's supervision? Meanwhile, Russ befriends a fellow bear skin bidder and bear guardsmen, who is requesting an attacking Mountain Lion mount for his new shop. Sam is given the job, but problems occur with what seemed to be a simple mount. To ease the staff, Russ has a shooting contest with the staff. The prize is a paid day off, the result ends with a duel between Russ and Aaron.
12	"Sasquatch in the Shop"	May 19, 2011
Dave and Doug can't believe their eyes when a menacing man looking like Sasquatch shows up unannounced. Russ up-sells a reluctant client and convinces the guy he's actually getting a favor. Russ and Tina first team up, then go head-to-head on one of Knight's rarest mounts. Doug gets the short end of the stick and is ordered to make more "Wally Wackers" from walrus bones.
13	"Tina's Packin' Heat"	June 9, 2011
A badass girl like Tina needs a badass gun. An Iditarod groupie wants a killer wolf hat that he can wear on the sled dog trail. A nervous client brings in a $30,000 problem that Russ isn't sure he can fix. And a confederate rebel pulls up to the shop with a bag of lynx.
14	"A Fight in the Woods"	June 16, 2011
A gigantic Kodiak Brown Bear can't keep its paws off Tina. Sam, Dave and Aaron push Doug to the limit with a string of practical jokes. An imposing client threatens not to pay unless he likes the mount.
15	"Teddy Beers"	June 23, 2011
Teddy Roosevelt's personal taxidermy kit inspires Russ to create his own, after a friend brings it to the shop. After one too many beers, Dave and Doug land themselves a project they can't get out of--one that has never before been attempted in the history of taxidermy. Russ and Tina rescue two extinct bird mounts. Russ calls in a favor from a Bush Pilot and soars off on the adventure of a lifetime.
