= Texas Car Wars =

- Genre: Documentary
- Country of origin: United States
- Original language: English
- No. of seasons: 1
- No. of episodes: 8

Production
- Executive producers: Craig Coffman; Graham Davidson; Tara Hunter; Jeff Keels; Tom Mireles; Jonathan Nowzardan
- Running time: 44 minutes (excluding episodes)
- Production company: Megalomedia

Original release
- Network: Discovery Channel
- Release: September 6 – October 25, 2012

Texas Car Wars is an American reality documentary television series on the Discovery Channel. The series debuted on September 9, 2012 and follows four auto body shops who participate in bidding wars in order to find the most valuable junk cars and refurbish them into jackpots.

== Episodes ==
No.	Title	Original release date	U.S. viewers (millions)
1	"Let The Rivalries Begin"	September 6, 2012	1.18
2	"Flip or Flop"	September 13, 2012	1.24
3	"Tale of the Filthy Greengo"	September 20, 2012	1.34
4	"Dukin' Donuts"	September 27, 2012	1.20
5	"A Presidential Flip"	October 4, 2012	1.30
6	"The El Camino King"	October 11, 2012	1.28
7	"Colby Takes Over"	October 18, 2012	1.16
8	"Race for the Cause"	October 25, 2012	1.32
