= Seven Network =

Australian broadcast television network

- Logo used since 2003
- Type: Free-to-air television network
- Country: Australia
- Broadcast area: Sydney; Melbourne; Brisbane; Adelaide; Perth; Darwin; Mount Isa; Mildura; Spencer Gulf & Broken Hill; Tasmania; Regional Queensland; Northern NSW & Gold Coast; Southern NSW & ACT; Regional Victoria; Remote Central & Eastern Australia; Western Australia
- Affiliates: WIN Television; (Griffith; Eastern SA)
- Headquarters: 8 Central Avenue; Eveleigh, New South Wales

Programming
- Language: English
- Picture format: 1080i HDTV (Note: Available on 7two, 7mate and 7Bravo.)

Ownership
- Owner: Seven Media Group
- Parent: Seven Network (Operations) Limited
- Sister channels: 7two 7mate 7flix 7Bravo; TVSN; Racing.com

History
- Launched: 4 November 1956; 70 years ago
- Former names: Australian Television Network (1963–1970, 1987–1991); Network 7 (1970–1984)

Links
- Website: 7plus.com.au

Availability

Terrestrial
- ATN Sydney (DVB-T 64-QAM): 1312 @ 6 (177.5 MHz)
- HSV Melbourne (DVB-T 64-QAM): 1328 @ 6 (177.5 MHz)
- BTQ Brisbane/Gold Coast (DVB-T 64-QAM): 1344 @ 6 (177.5 MHz)
- SAS Adelaide (DVB-T 64-QAM): 1360 @ 6 (177.5 MHz)
- TVW Perth/Mandurah (DVB-T 64-QAM): 1376 @ 6 (177.5 MHz)
- Freeview Seven metro, QLD (virtual): 7/71
- Freeview Seven Tasmania, Darwin, regional & remote (virtual): 6/61
- Freeview 7HD (virtual): 70/60

Streaming media
- 7plus (Only in Australia)

Seven Network (commonly known as Channel Seven or simply Seven) is one of Australia's major free-to-air television networks and media platforms. Based in Sydney, NSW, the network broadcasts a range of local Australian and foreign English-language programming across Australia, including factual television (e.g. Seven News), sports, reality television and scripted television programming.

From the 1970s to 2025, Seven was operated by media mogul Kerry Stokes as its Chairman and major stockholder, who retains a sizeable interest as of 2026. It is owned by media company Seven Media Group since 2026.

As of 2025, Seven Network is the first-rated television network and primary channel in Australia, ahead of the Nine Network, ABC TV, Network 10 and SBS TV.

== History ==
=== Origins ===
The present Seven Network began in the 1950s as a group of independent stations in the capital cities of Sydney, Melbourne, Brisbane, Adelaide and Perth.

HSV-7 Melbourne, licensed to The Herald and Weekly Times Ltd (owners of two local papers at the time, The Herald and The Sun), was launched on 4 November 1956, as Melbourne's first television station to use the VHF7 frequency.

ATN-7 Sydney, licensed to Amalgamated Television Services, a subsidiary of Fairfax, was launched on 2 December 1956, as Sydney's third television station.

HSV-7 and ATN-7 did not immediately share resources, but instead formed content-sharing partnerships with their VHF9 counterparts. By 1957 ATN-7 partnered with Melbourne's GTV-9, while HSV-7 paired up with Sydney's TCN-9.

TVW-7 Perth, licensed to TVW Limited, a subsidiary of West Australian Newspapers, began broadcasting almost two years later, on 16 October 1959, becoming Perth's first television station.

BTQ-7 Brisbane followed on 1 November 1959, as Brisbane's second television station.

ADS-7 Adelaide was launched on 24 October 1959 as the final capital city VHF7 station. The station later swapped frequencies with SAS-10 on 27 December 1987 as ADS-10 and SAS-7.

HSV-7 began its relationship with the Victorian Football League (now the Australian Football League) in April 1957, when the station broadcast the first live Australian rules football match. At the time, the stations operated independently of each other, with schedules made up of various simple programs that were inexpensive to produce, such as Pick a Box and spin-offs of popular radio shows. In the early 1960s, coaxial cable links were formed initially between Sydney and Melbourne, which allowed the sharing of programs and simultaneous broadcasts of live TV shows.

In 1960, Frank Packer, the owner of Sydney's TCN-9, bought a controlling share of Melbourne's GTV-9. This created the country's first television network (unofficially called "the National Nine Network") and dissolved the ATN-7/GTV-9 and the HSV-7/TCN-9 partnerships. Left without their original partners, ATN-7 and HSV-7 joined to form the Australian Television Network (ATN) in 1963. The new grouping was soon joined by other capital-city channel 7 stations, ADS-7 Adelaide and BTQ-7 Brisbane.

ATN began to produce and screen higher-budget programs to attract viewers, notably the Australian show Homicide (1964–1977), a series that would continue for another 12 years to become the nation's longest running drama series of the period. After the network adopted the Network 7 name in 1970, a national network logo was adopted. Stations remained independently owned and operated with local advertising campaigns.

Color television was introduced across the network in 1975, when a new colour logo was adopted.

In 1979, Rupert Murdoch made an unsuccessful bid for the Herald and Weekly Times, owners of HSV-7, later going on to gain control of rival ATV-10. Fairfax successfully bought a 14.9% share of Network 7 later that same year. A decade of media magnates jostling for control of Australian's media landscape was to follow.

=== 1980s ===
The 1980s saw the introduction of stereophonic sound, as well as several successful shows, most notably A Country Practice in 1981, and Sons and Daughters in 1982. The 1980 Summer Olympics in Moscow were shown live on the network in 1980. Neighbours began on Seven in 1985, but low ratings in Sydney led to the cancellation of the new series at the end of the year, which later moved to Network 10 and went on to achieve international success.

Perth-based businessman Robert Holmes à Court, through his business the Bell Group, bought TVW-7 from its original owners, West Australian Newspapers in 1982. It was in 1984 that the network proceeded to drop the "Network 7" branding. The Herald and Weekly Times, owner of HSV-7 and ADS-7, was sold to Rupert Murdoch in December 1986 for an estimated $1.8 billion. Murdoch's company, News Limited, sold off HSV-7 to Fairfax soon afterwards for $320 million. Fairfax went on to remove a number of locally produced shows in favour of networked content from its Sydney counterpart, ATN-7 (also owned by Fairfax at the time).

Cross-media ownership laws introduced in 1987 forced Fairfax to choose between its print and television operations. Fairfax chose print and sold its television stations to Qintex Ltd., owned by businessman Christopher Skase. Qintex had previously bought, and subsequently sold off, stations in Brisbane and regional Queensland before taking control of the network. It was also in 1987 that the network returned to the "Australian Television Network" branding. The next year, another new logo was introduced along with the evening soap Home and Away and a relaunched Seven National News, now known as Seven News. The network became truly national in 1988 when Skase bought TVW-7 for $130 million. In 1991, the network changed its name once again to Seven Network, though it had been unofficially using that name for some time before then.

Despite the network's successes, a failed $1.5 billion bid for MGM Studios in the same year sent Qintex into receivership. Christopher Skase fled Australia in 1990 to escape extradition. The business' assets were bundled together by receivers and made into a new company, Seven Network Limited, in 1991.

=== 1990s ===
The network was listed on the stock exchange in 1993, soon after the entry of subscription television provider Australis. One of Seven's popular series, A Country Practice, ended in 1993 after 1058 episodes. Blue Heelers was also introduced in 1993, and, after a number of time-slot changes, was moved to Wednesdays in 1998. This was to make room for a new series, the medical drama All Saints. Both dramas rated quite highly and along with new lifestyle shows Better Homes and Gardens and The Great Outdoors, resulted in a stronger ratings position for the network.

In 1995, Sunshine Television, a Seven Network affiliate in regional Queensland, was purchased by the network's parent company, Seven Network Limited. Sunshine Television's regional stations effectively became a part of Seven Network, identical in appearance and programming to the rest of the business' stations. Australian Gladiators proved popular; Series 1 and 2 were filmed in Brisbane in 1995–1996, and Series 3 was filmed in Sydney. Seven Queensland won the annual audience ratings for the first time in 1998.

Between 1995 and April 2001, Alan Jackson of Nylex was the non-executive director of Seven, after being asked by Stokes to lead the company.

A successful $1.3 billion bid for United Artists was made in conjunction with Kirk Kerkorian in 1996, but the network sold its stake two years later for US$389 million. Seven took control of Australia Television, the Australian Broadcasting Corporation's Asian satellite channel, in 1997. The Australian Broadcasting Corporation still maintained a share in the network and continued to produce news and current affairs programming for it.

=== 2000s ===
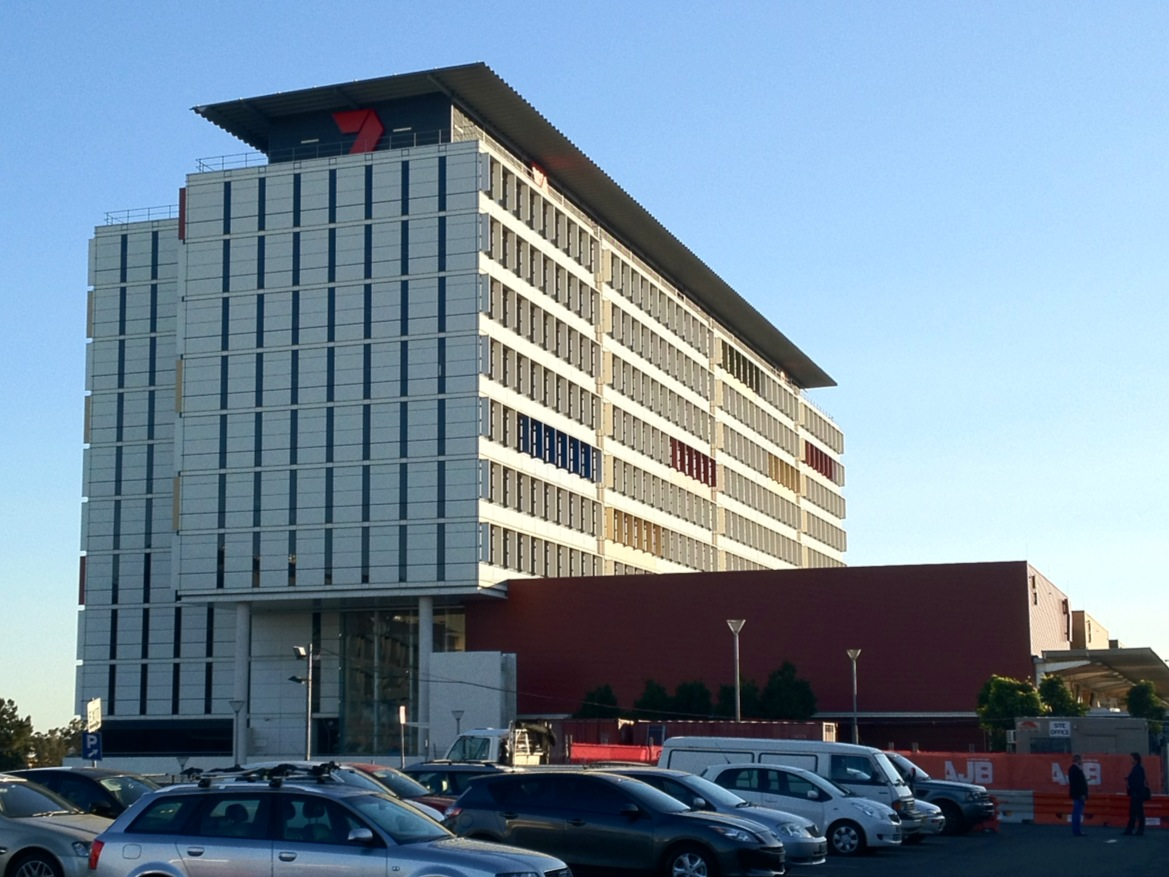
8 Central Avenue, Eveleigh; the Seven Network's current headquarters in Sydney

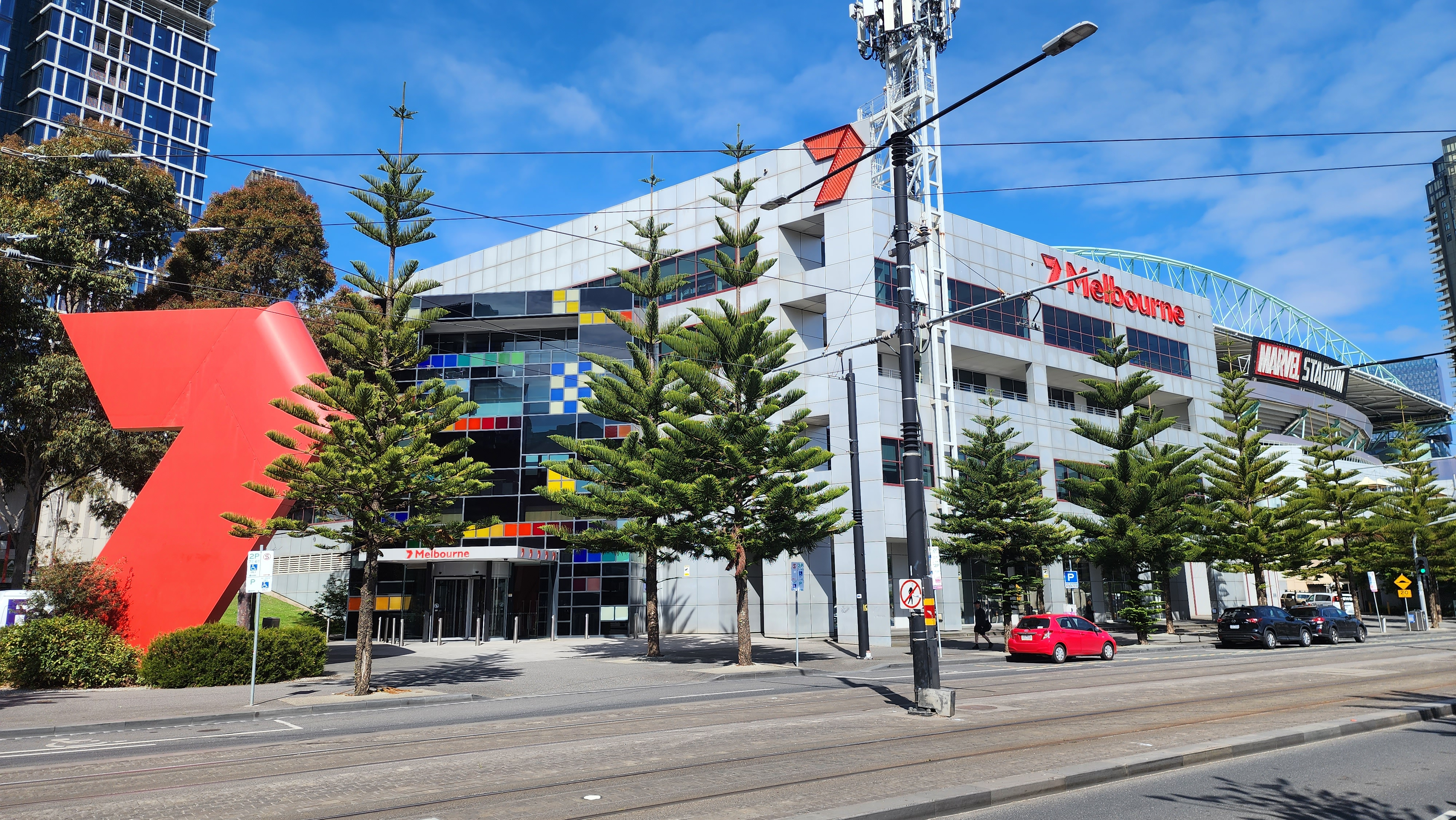
The network's centralised digital playout facility, Broadcast Centre Melbourne, located in the city's Docklands precinct.

During the late 1990s and early 2000s, a high-definition national broadcast facility was constructed in Docklands, Melbourne, replacing the previous facility in Epping, Sydney. This new facility would also house HSV-7's Melbourne offices and studios.

The year 2000 saw former Nine executive David Leckie appointed as head of television operations, re-launching the network with an updated logo and a new advertising campaign timed for the network's coverage of the 2000 Summer Olympics in Sydney. The opening ceremony, with 6.5 million viewers, was one of Australia's highest-ever rating television programs, contributing to the network winning the ratings year for the first time in twenty-two years.

Digital television was introduced to most of the network's coverage area on 1 January 2001. This was soon followed by the gradual introduction of wide screen and high definition programming.

In January 2006, Seven Network, Pacific Magazines and online portal Yahoo! Australia and New Zealand combined in a joint venture to form Yahoo!7, representing all three companies' online assets.

On 15 September 2007, 7HD was officially announced with the Seven Media Group announcing their intention to start a high definition multichannel that was initially expected to launch in December 2007. 7HD became the first free-to-air commercial television channel introduced to metropolitan areas since 1988, when it launched prior on 15 October 2007, with 25th Hour being the first program broadcast at 10:30 pm.

On 14 February 2008, the Seven Media Group and Foxtel officially signed an agreement allowing Seven's digital signal to be transmitted via Foxtel's cable and satellite services. Seven became available on Foxtel in early 2009.

On 25 September 2009, Seven announced its new digital channel, 7two, which officially launched on 1 November 2009.

=== 2010s ===
On 18 January 2010, Seven launched the online catch-up TV website called PLUS7.

On 25 September 2010, in conjunction with the 2010 AFL Grand Final, Seven launched its second multi-digital channel 7mate. 7mate is targeted towards a male audience, particularly those aged between 16 and 49.

In January 2011, the big red 7 logos were expanded to GWN7 and Prime7's rebranding respectively. The news bulletins were renamed as GWN7 News and Prime7 News. GWN and Prime relaunched on 16 January 2011 at 6:00 pm, and its digital channels were branded as 7two and 7mate.

In December 2011, Seven announced its intention to expand into digital datacasting known as 4ME, a digital channel owned by the Prime Media Group on channel 64 in Prime7 and regional areas and Channel 74 in other areas.

In October 2012, Seven began cost-cutting by shedding a number of behind-the-scenes technical positions. Seven also reduced their SNG transponder link capacity on Optus D1 from three (at 12.661,12.671 & 12.681 GHz) to two (at 12.644 & 12.653 GHz), which are used by ATN Sydney for Sunrise and national news location up-links, as well as for other local station location up-links.

In November 2012, Seven changed its on-air theme. This included a new look for program advisory ratings, program listings, program advertisements, and promotions.

As of 10 December 2013, Seven no longer broadcasts on analogue TV and is now only available through digital TV or digital set-top box.

On 26 June 2015, Racing.com began broadcasting on channel 78 as a joint venture between Seven West Media and Racing Victoria following a blackout of Victorian horse racing by Sky Racing. Initially broadcasting an interim live feed from the Racing.com website, the channel was officially launched on 29 August 2015.

In January 2016, Seven changed its on-air theme. This included a new look for program listings, program advertisements and promotions.

On 7 February 2016, during the ad-break of Molly, after months of speculation, Seven officially announced their new channel, 7flix, on channel 76. 7flix was launched at 6 am on 28 February 2016.

On 10 May 2016, 7HD returned as a high definition simulcast on channel 70. Initially, the Melbourne and Adelaide markets received 7HD as a HD simulcast of Seven's primary channel, while the Sydney, Brisbane and Perth markets received 7HD as an HD simulcast of 7mate; this was to allow Australian Football League (AFL) matches to be broadcast in HD in those markets. Sydney, Brisbane and Perth temporarily received 7HD as a simulcast of the primary channel for the duration of the 2016 Summer Olympics before the change was made permanent during and after the 2017 Australian Open. Up until 16 January 2020, breakaway programming was used to show further AFL matches and Australian cricket matches in HD.

In June 2017, following the acquisition of Yahoo! by Verizon Communications, Seven announced plans to launch a wholly owned standalone service to replace PLUS7. In September 2017, Seven announced the new service would be known as 7plus and would launch in November 2017. As of September 2017, Seven's live streaming service, now named 7Live, is no longer accessible from within the PLUS7 and the Yahoo7 portal.

On 1 December 2018, Seven announced 7food network, a new digital channel, which launched on channel 74. The announcement with Discovery Network followed SBS food network losing its deal with Discovery-owned Scripps Network. The channel ceased broadcast on 28 December 2019, just over a year after it launched, though Seven continued to utilise the Food Network branding elsewhere.

=== 2020s ===
In June 2020, Big Brother Australia made a return on the Seven Network with a reboot. On the night of the premiere, Seven also changed their on-air theme.

On 19 June 2020, it was announced that The Daily Edition had been cancelled by Seven Network after 7 years, and hosts Sally Obermeder and Ryan Phelan would be leaving the network. The final episode aired on 26 June 2020.

In July 2020, Seven Network unveiled new logos for its multi-channels, beginning with 7mate, followed by 7two and 7flix. The re-branding also extended to its on-demand platform, 7plus, which was stylised as "7+" as part of a broader branding overhaul of its multichannel services.

In March 2021, it was announced that Seven Network would move out of Martin Place to Eveleigh in 2023, after almost two decades.

On 1 November 2021, Seven West Media announced that it would acquire all the shares and subsidiaries of Prime Media Group. This was Seven West Media's second attempt at purchasing Prime, after its previous attempt in 2019 was thwarted by Australian Community Media boss Antony Catalano and rival WIN Corporation owner Bruce Gordon, who cited Seven's debt problems at the time and its poor ratings performance as their reason for their refusal. This development would mark an end to the Prime branding after 33 years in favour of Seven Network's branding and would see all news bulletins carry the Seven News brand. Prior to this, Prime7 (and sister GWN7 in regional and remote Western Australia) was the only network not to fully use its metro affiliate branding despite carrying Seven branded promos, since WIN Television (except for WIN News) and Southern Cross Austereo use full Nine and 10 network branding on their stations. It was also announced that Seven would look to expand its investment in local news following the merger. A majority of Prime's shareholders voted in favour of the deal on 23 December, with the sale completed on 31 December.

Commencing June 2022, Seven moved to a national brand across all of its regions, in time for the 2022 Commonwealth Games. Introduced to regional audiences on 6 June 2022, viewers in those markets began to see the Prime7 and GWN7 logos transition into the national Seven branding.

Seven announced in October 2022 it would launch a new free-to-air channel, 7Bravo on 15 January 2023, on LCN 75 in metropolitan areas and LCN 65 in regional areas. As a result, ishop TV moved from LCN 65 to LCN 67 in the former Seven regional areas. 7Bravo shows reality shows and true crime. The launch is a partnership between Seven Network and NBCUniversal International Networks & Direct-to-Consumer.

On 30 November 2022, various channel changes on Seven Network happened to accommodate for the new 7Bravo channel, including a 7mate SD (Channel 73) switch-off. On the same day, 7Bravo on channel 75 appeared on the Seven multiplex, and ishop TV moving to channel 67 placeholder in seven regional areas.

In June 2023, 7NEWS moved their operations from Martin Place to new purpose-built studios in Eveleigh, offering five times the space and permanent sets for all programs. For the first time in more than 40 years, the whole Seven Sydney operation, including all staff, were under one roof. In July 2023, Sunrise hosted its first broadcast at its new studios. The first edition went to air live at 5:30am on 24 July 2023, with hosts Natalie Barr and Matt Shirvington, news presenter Edwina Bartholomew and sports presenter Mark Beretta, followed by The Morning Show's Larry Emdur and Kylie Gillies.

On 22 January 2024, TVSN and Seven West Media signed a new broadcast deal, which means the channel will be on Seven from 1 July 2024, shifting from 10 and WIN Television. TVSN will be on channel 77 in metropolitan areas and regional Queensland, channel 67 in other regional areas and on 7plus nationally.

In May 2025, Seven West Media announced its intention to purchase Southern Cross Austereo's regional Seven Network affiliate stations in Tasmania, Darwin, Spencer Gulf, Broken Hill, Mount Isa and Remote Central and Eastern Australia for $3.75 million. The sale was completed on 1 July 2025.

Following a failure in negotiating a new affiliate deal with WIN Television, the Seven Network temporarily ceased broadcasting in Riverland, Griffith, and Mount Gambier from 1 July to 3 July 2025.

Following Seven's acquisition of Southern Cross Austereo's television assets, Seven and Southern Cross Media Group (owners of SCA) announced in September 2025 their intention to merge. The merger was completed on 7 January 2026 with Seven West Media delisted from the ASX.

== Ownership ==
After Seven's merger with West Australian print publications in 2011, Seven West Media became a pillar of Stokes' once dominant, yet now declining, influence on Australian politics and society. In 2026, Seven West Media was transferred to its parent Seven Media Group (formerly known as Southern Cross Media Group) (ASX: SMG) along with Southern Cross Austereo, with Stokes retaining an estimated 20% voting share in the platform as of May 2026 via his controlling stake in Seven Group Holdings, and a role as an advisor to the board. Stokes' son Ryan Stokes is a board member, along with Stokes' former "right-hand man" Bruce McWilliam, who owns an additional 10% stake, thus cementing the Stokes family influence on the company for the foreseeable future. The platform also owns Australian publishing company Pacific Magazines and maintains a 33% stake in News24.

== Headquarters ==
Seven's administration headquarters are in Eveleigh, Sydney, with the building having been completed in 2003. National news and current affairs programming are based at the flagship stations ATN-7 in Sydney and HSV-7 in Melbourne. In 2009, Seven moved its Sydney-based production operations from Epping to a purpose-built high-definition television production facility at the Australian Technology Park in Eveleigh.

== Market position ==
As of 2025, Seven is the highest-rated television network in Australia according to VOZ, ranking ahead of the Nine Network, ABC TV, Network 10, and SBS. Historically the network had struggled in the ratings since the 1960s, until the 2000s, not long after the introduction of the OzTAM ratings system in 2001. Seven responded to another drop in audience numbers in 2004, with a slate of newly commissioned local programming for 2005, the success of news and current affairs shows along with US-produced series in the late 2000s, leading to a significant and lasting boost in its audience. During the 2011 ratings season, Seven achieved the highest total viewer ratings across all 40 weeks of the rating year, the first network to accomplish this since OzTAM ratings began. In 2014, Seven Network had attained the second-largest viewership in Australia, and by 2020s had finally made it to the top of the ratings ladder.

== Digital channels ==
Early in the digital era, Seven provided a 576p enhanced-definition service through digital TV. On 18 March 2007, test simulcasts for 1080i commenced in the Sydney and Melbourne markets, Adelaide and Perth followed on 24 June 2007, with Brisbane following on 25 June 2007, and regional Queensland on 26 June 2007. The 1080i high definition version was then replaced by the new youth orientated 7mate channel in MPEG4 HD, and Seven was broadcast only in standard definition MPEG2.

On 1 April 2008, ATN Sydney began broadcasting a digital signal to Foxtel and Austar's satellite and cable subscribers.

On 5 February 2025, Seven Network began the discontinuation of standard definition signal, to became high-definition (HD) only across Australia, phasing out older MPEG-2 technology in favour of MPEG-4. Adelaide transitioned first, on 5 February, followed by Perth on 30 April, and Brisbane on 9 July. The Sydney market was scheduled to transition 7 October 2025, with Melbourne being the final metropolitan region to switch on 27 February 2026. The transition affects Channels 7, 70, and 71, with 7two now HD only, whereas other digital channels such as 7mate and 7Bravo had already operated in MPEG4 HD. Viewers with older TVs have the need to perform a channel re-scan in 2026, or purchase a new TV or HD-compatible set-top box to continue receiving the Seven service.

Seven's core programming is fibre-fed out of HSV Melbourne to sister stations and regional affiliates, with ATN Sydney providing national news and current affairs programming. Receiving stations and affiliates insert their own localised news and advertising, which is broadcast through owned-and-operated stations in metropolitan Australia via ATN Sydney, HSV Melbourne, BTQ Brisbane, SAS Adelaide and TVW Perth; and to regional areas via NEN in Northern NSW & the Gold Coast, Queensland, CBN in Southern NSW & ACT, AMV in regional Victoria, PTV in Mildura, STQ in regional Queensland, Seven Regional WA, TNT in Tasmania, GTS/BKN in the Spencer Gulf and Broken Hill, TND Darwin in the Northern Territory, and QQQ in remote Central Australia and Eastern Australia.

Seven Network programming is also carried by third-party affiliate WIN Television in Mount Gambier, the Riverland of South Australia and the Murrumbidgee Irrigation Area of New South Wales.

=== 7HD ===
7HD logo

The 7HD multichannel was produced from October 2007 until 25 September 2010, discontinued, then later revived on 10 May 2016. The revival version initially broadcast split services: identical main channel programming for Melbourne and Adelaide, and continuous programming from 7mate for other metropolitan cities in 1080i MPEG-4 HD via Freeview. The split was implemented to allow broadcast of Australian rules football (AFL) matches in HD. By 16 December 2016, Seven quietly shifted to main channel programming on a long-term basis for Sydney, Brisbane and Perth.

=== 7plus ===
7plus logo (2020–present)

7plus is a video on demand and catch up TV service wholly owned and operated by the Seven Network. In June 2017, following the acquisition of Yahoo! by Verizon Communications, Seven announced plans to launch a wholly owned standalone replacement for PLUS7, a catch-up TV service jointly owned by Seven Network and Yahoo! within the following six months.

In September 2017 Seven announced a launch date, and on 27 November 2017 7plus was launched offering on-demand episodes of television series and a live streaming service providing live access to Seven's main channel, 7two, 7mate, 7flix, 7Bravo and Racing.com. The service was made available in HD, with plans to add Chromecast and Apple Airplay support. PLUS7 was subsequently terminated 31 March 2018.

On 23 July 2020, 7plus introduced a new logo styled as 7+.

== News and current affairs ==
Seven News Sydney and Sunrise reporter Jessica Dietrich reporting outside the Australian Broadcasting Corporation's Ultimo studios in Sydney.

Seven Network's news service is called Seven News (formerly Australian Television News (ATVN) and Seven National News). The Seven News division produces the Seven News flagship locally produced 6pm news broadcast, in addition to Seven Afternoon News, Seven News: Spotlight Sunrise, The Morning Show, and Weekend Sunrise.

Real Life, a national current affairs program hosted by Stan Grant and similar in format to the Nine Network's A Current Affair, was launched in 1992, but was replaced by the more successful Today Tonight in 1995.

The following year, Seven's news and public affairs ratings began to increase in viewers, with Today Tonight challenging rival A Current Affair, and the new format of Sunrise leading to increased competition with Nine Network's Today. Seven's evening news bulletins also started to take the lead, with success in most cities.

In 2009, a new weekly public affairs show Sunday Night launched in the Sunday 6:30pm time slot, to a shaky start, but by the end of the year was winning its position and rating up to 250,000 more than its rival, the Nine Network's long-running Australian version of US current affairs show 60 Minutes.

Seven has exclusive contracts with NBC News, ITN, and Three (New Zealand) to repackage international news coverage. During the early hours of 4am to 6am, Seven rebroadcasts portions of US television network NBC's news and current affairs programming, including Today and Meet the Press.

In 1988, Seven adopted NBC News' main theme song, The Mission, for Seven News. On 5 July 2008, Seven introduced a watermark on news and current affairs programming.

=== Seven News audience numbers and impact of lead-in programming ===
After trailing for many decades to Nine News (previously National Nine News) and 10 News (previously Ten Eyewitness News and 10 News First) in markets, Seven News rebounded from February 2005 onward, claiming Australia's number one television news and current affairs service.

Under the guidance of former long-time Nine News chief Peter Meakin, Seven's news and current affairs division has produced more locally focused content, lifting viewership for key markets such as Sydney and Melbourne. Between 2007 and 2010, Seven News completed a clean sweep of the five capital cities, as the most watched 6pm news bulletin.

Since February 2005, ratings for Deal or No Deal, Seven News and Today Tonight have gradually increased. Seven News was the highest-rated news service nationally in both the 2005 and 2006 ratings seasons. A key aspect of Seven's recent ratings dominance in news and current affairs has been attributed to Deal or No Deal's top rating audience (and, since late 2015, audiences for The Chase Australia), which provide Seven News with a big lead-in audience.

From 2010, Seven Network began to create a five to 20-minute delay in the scheduled start time of non-live programming after 7:30pm, in an attempt to minimise viewer channel surfing and loss of audience to other networks. Commercial breaks are first increased in duration to create the delay, then decreased once prime time is over. This has created a challenge for regional affiliates such as Prime and Southern Cross, who must adapt to delays in the live play-out, which can cause station identification or a black screen to be displayed between programs, or the start of a program to be missed entirely, due to the overlap in schedules.

== Sport ==
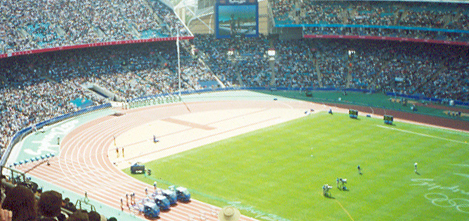
Telecast to 6.5 million Australians via Seven Network – The Sydney 2000 Summer Olympics.

Seven is a major purchaser of Australian sports broadcasting rights. Seven's popular recurring sporting events include the Commonwealth Games, Big Bash League, Women's Big Bash League, Australian Test Cricket, World Rally Championship, Australian Rally Championship, Australian Off Road Championship, AFL Premiership Season, the Australian PGA Championship golf, the Australian Open Golf, the Australian Open Tennis until Seven lost the rights in 2018, Bledisloe Cup Rugby, Mount Buller World Aerials, the Sydney to Hobart Yacht Race, the Tri-Nations Rugby, and horse racing events including the Melbourne Cup Carnival until Seven lost the rights in 2018, and Queensland's annual Magic Millions race day.

The network had the exclusive coverage of the 2000 Sydney Olympics, which attracted a TV audience of over 6.5 million Australians for the opening and closing ceremonies. The broadcast also ran on the short-lived C7 Sport subscription channel.

On 25 January 2001, Network Ten, Nine Network, and pay TV provider Foxtel won the rights from Seven to televise AFL games from 2002 to 2006. This ended Seven's famous 45-year run as the exclusive AFL football broadcaster. On 5 January 2006 the Australian Football League accepted a bid from Seven and Ten to broadcast AFL games from 2007 to 2011 at a cost of A$780 million. Since 2011, Seven has been the exclusive free-to-air broadcaster of the AFL Premiership Season to at least 2031.

Seven had exclusive Australian free-to-air, pay television, online and mobile telephony broadcast rights to the 2008 Summer Olympics in Beijing. The live telecast of the XXIX Olympiad was shared by both Seven Network and SBS Television. Seven broadcast the opening and closing ceremonies and mainstream sports including swimming, athletics, rowing, cycling and gymnastics. In stark contrast, SBS TV provided complementary coverage focused on long-form events such as soccer, road cycling, volleyball, and table tennis.

In 2010, Seven launched new AFL and NRL based entertainment shows to take on Nine's The AFL Footy Show and The NRL Footy Show and provide a bargaining chip in negotiations for AFL and NRL broadcast rights. AFL series The Bounce, hosted by Peter Helliar, was pulled from the air after just five episodes. NRL series,The Matty Johns Show, hosted by former Footy Show host Matthew Johns, lasted one season.

From 2016, Seven became the home of the Summer Olympic Games, Winter Olympic Games and the Summer Paralympic Games. The Network secured the Australian broadcast rights to the Olympic Games. In October 2020, it was named as the Australian broadcast service for the 2022 Winter Olympics in Beijing.

In 2016, Seven Network won the broadcasting rights deal to be the main broadcaster of the 2017 Rugby League World Cup in Australia, beating the other regular rugby league broadcasting channels of Fox League and the Nine Network to secure the deal.

Seven Network also screened the 2018 Commonwealth Games on the Gold Coast in April 2018, and the 2022 Commonwealth Games from Birmingham in July 2022.

In 2018, Seven Network, in conjunction with Foxtel, acquired free-to-air broadcasting rights to cricket in Australia. This ended Nine's famous 45-year run as the exclusive cricket broadcaster and Ten's five-year run as the exclusive Big Bash League broadcaster. The network will televise all men's international test matches, 43 Big Bash League Matches, all women's Internationals (T20Is, ODIs and Tests) and 23 Women's Big Bash League Matches. The six-year deal starts in 2018/19 and runs until 2023/24. In 2023, Seven announced that it reached an agreement with Cricket Australia to extend its media rights from the 2024–25 season to the 2030–31 season. The new seven-year agreement between Seven and Cricket Australia includes two Ashes Test Series as well as two Indian tours of Australia. In addition, Cricket Australia will revamp the BBL to create a shorter tournament that will run for five to six weeks to screen on the Seven network.

From 2017 to 2024, the AFL Premiership Season and cricket matches were not accessible through the 7plus live streaming service given the digital broadcast rights were owned by Telstra Media and Kayo Sports respectively. Border Security International repeats played on the channel's live stream in the event's place until the match was over, before returning to normal programming.

In 2020, Seven regained the TV rights to the Supercars Championship, sharing the rights with Foxtel in a deal worth $200 million for 5 years (2021–2025). The new deal has Seven Sport show seven rounds of the Supercars Championship live and showing highlights of the rounds it is not able to televise

In 2024, Nine Network won the rights to broadcast the Olympic Games until 2032. Seven Network announced it will still broadcast Glasgow 2026 and 2030 Commonwealth Games live and free across Australia on TV, digital and 7plus Sport.

== Game shows, reality, scripted and lifestyle programming ==
=== Australian content ===
Commensurate with Australian content rules for commercial broadcasters, Seven features local programming on the network. Similarly to other commercial broadcasters in Australia, programming is heavily focused on reality television and lifestyle content. However, shows range from original drama series e.g. RFDS: Royal Flying Doctor Service and Packed to the Rafters; soaps such as Home and Away; lifestyle magazine shows e.g. Better Homes and Gardens; game shows e.g. The Chase Australia, The 1% Club; entertainment e.g. Sunrise, The Front Bar, The Morning Show, TV Week Logie Awards; factual programming e.g.The Force, Border Security, Highway Patrol, Crime Investigation Australia, Beach Cops, Surveillance Oz and Gold Coast Medical; and reality, including Australian Idol, My Kitchen Rules, The Farmer Wants a Wife, SAS Australia, The Voice Australia, Dancing with the Stars Australia, Dream Home, Made in Bondi, First Dates, Stranded on Honeymoon Island.

==== Australian shows on Seven: 1980s ====
The 1980s saw Channel Seven launch some of Australia's most iconic television drama and soaps. A Country Practice was first broadcast in 1981, running for twelve years, with and Sons and Daughters launched the following year in 1982.

Neighbours, Australia's most famous soap opera and highly-successful export to UK television, was originally commissioned by Seven in 1985, but was cancelled, only to find success on Channel Ten for its second season. Evening soap Home and Away was launched in 1988, and became an instant success.

The Australian version of US game show Wheel of Fortune began its 25-year run in July 1981, from ADS-7's studios in Adelaide.

==== Australian content on Seven: 1990s ====
Prime-time police drama Blue Heelers was commissioned in 1993, then bumped in 1998 from its prime-time slot, by medical drama All Saints. Game show Australian Gladiators had ratings success over three seasons, from 1995 to 1998. Lifestyle programming became a hot new format, with Seven's first iteration of travel show The Great Outdoors (1993–2009), and Better Homes and Gardens, winner of 12 Silver Logies for Most Popular Lifestyle Program, which debuted in 1995 and has run regularly ever since.

==== Australian content on Seven: 2000s ====
Always Greener, launched in 2001, received two million viewers in its Sunday time slot. It was cancelled after its second season due to declining audience numbers. In 2004, Seven launched the internationally known game show Deal or No Deal hosted by Andrew O'Keefe, in the 5.30 pm weekday time slot as a lead-in to the network's struggling flagship news bulletin. Deal or No Deal replaced the network's long-running Wheel Of Fortune, as it moved to 5pm weekdays. Later in 2004, Dancing with the Stars, based on the BBC's Strictly Come Dancing, was also launched.

The network's launch of new series from the United States in 2006 (including Heroes, Prison Break, Dancing with the Stars spin-off It Takes Two, How I Met Your Mother, and My Name Is Earl) saw long-running series Blue Heelers end its 13th season, after declining ratings since late 2003. Despite the success of new US-produced shows, Seven still finished second behind the Nine Network for the fifth time in six years, primarily due to Nine's coverage of the 2006 Commonwealth Games in Melbourne.

In 2007 Seven defeated Nine, winning 38 weeks compared to the Nine Network's 2, to become the number one network in Australia. Seven's 2008 launch of local drama Packed to the Rafters became the year's top rated show with an average of 1.938 million viewers.

==== Australian content on Seven: 2010s ====
In 2011, Seven put Packed to the Rafters on hiatus, putting new Melbourne drama Winners and Losers in its place, which soon became a network staple, at times winning the nation's highest ratings. In 2013, Seven Network launched a successful fifth local drama A Place to Call Home.

In September 2015, the network launched The Chase Australia, a spinoff of the British series The Chase, featuring Chasers Anne Hegerty (from the British series), Brydon Coverdale (winner of $307,000 on Million Dollar Minute), Matt Parkinson and Issa Schultz. In 2016, Mark Labbett made his debut as one of the Chasers, joining fellow UK Chaser, Anne Hegerty and in 2018, Shaun Wallace made his debut as its sixth chaser. Seven also launched Australian comedy-drama 800 Words starring Erik Thomson, becoming the highest-rated drama of 2015.

===== Australian content on Seven: 2020s =====
In June 2020, Big Brother Australia made a return on Seven Network with a rebooted pre-recorded program. Hosted by Sonia Kruger, the series was prerecorded in a warehouse in Sydney, described by TV Blackbox as "Survivor in a warehouse". The exact location is North Head Sanctuary, also known as The Barracks.

Seven announced in 2020 the acquisition of reality series The Voice Australia in 2021 as well as a reboot of Australian Idol.

Seven confirmed in December 2020 it had commissioned a return to a new "all stars" event version of Dancing With The Stars. The Australian Idol reboot returned to the screens of Seven in 2023.

=== Foreign content ===
Like the other commercial broadcasters in Australia, Seven buys in American programs to air on Seven and its digital multi-channels, sourced from Seven's deals with 20th Century Studios and Disney Television Studios / 20th Television, Universal Studios, Inc. / NBCUniversal Global Distribution and Illumination, DreamWorks / DreamWorks Animation, StudioCanal, Sony Pictures Motion Picture Group / Sony Pictures Television, CBS Studios and Icon Films.

==== US Studio Deals ====
The network formerly broadcast catalogue movie and television titles from Metro-Goldwyn-Mayer produced in the 1990s prior to 2011, Disney from 1980s to 2023, Miramax from 2007 to 2012, Paramount from the 1990s to 2022 and Warner Bros. from 1990 to 2024, and had output deals with Sony Pictures Television and NBCUniversal. On 7two, in the early 2010s, Seven aired classic and silver-screen movies from the Sony Pictures (Columbia & TriStar) catalogue.

In mid-2013 the network changed its deals with Sony and NBCUniversal. Commensurate with the American network's own slump, Seven had not found success with an NBC prime time series since 2007. Seven renegotiated its NBCUniversal deal to continue rights to air existing popular NBC co-produced programs including Downton Abbey and Mrs Brown's Boys, as well as NBC News content. Seven signed a three-year minimum quota deal with Sony, whereby Seven will agree to purchase a set number of Sony produced US prime time series and films per year, with titles to be cherry-picked each season.

In late 2016, Seven created a new acquired programming deal with Warner Bros, granting the network programming rights. In 2018 it was reported that Seven had formed an agreement with 20th Century Fox to air selected Fox programming. On 15 January 2023, Seven created a new acquired programming deal with NBCUniversal, granting the network programming rights.

==== Shared American Programming ====
Shared American programming that airs on Seven and Nine and their digital multi-channels are sourced from Seven and Nine's deals with 20th Century Studios / 20th Television, Warner Bros. International Television Distribution, DreamWorks and DreamWorks Animation, NBCUniversal Global Distribution / Illumination, StudioCanal and Sony Pictures Television.

Shared American programming that airs on Seven and 10 and their digital multi-channels are sourced from Seven and 10's deals with CBS Studios, DreamWorks / DreamWorks Animation, Warner Bros. International Television Distribution and Sony Pictures Television.

Shared American programming that airs on Seven and ABC and their digital multi-channels are sourced from Seven and ABC's deals with NBCUniversal Global Distribution, StudioCanal and Sony Pictures Television.

== Awards ==
Due to Seven's coverage of the 2008 Summer Olympics, the International Olympic Committee awarded Seven the 'Golden Rings' award for "Best Olympic Programme". The award is given for the best overall Olympic coverage.

At the 2018 Sport Australia media awards, Seven won the "Best coverage of a sporting event" award for the coverage of the 2018 Commonwealth Games in Gold Coast.

Seven Network's coverage of the Tokyo 2020 Summer Olympic Games saw them win three awards (gold, silver and bronze) at the International Olympic Committee's coveted Golden Rings Awards.

== Controversies ==
In September 2011, Seven broadcast a report featuring journalist Tim Noonan and writer and adventurer Paul Raffaele visiting Brazil's Suruwahá tribe and describing them as child murderers, "Stone Age" relics, and "one of the worst human rights violators in the world". Survival International, the global movement for tribal people's rights, sent a complaint to Seven outlining the many errors and distortions in the report. After the channel refused to correct the inaccuracies in the program, Survival filed a complaint with the Australian Communications and Media Authority (ACMA), which opened a formal investigation. In September 2012, the network was found guilty by the press regulator of serious violations of the broadcasting code. The ACMA ruled that the channel was guilty of breaking its racism clause – having "provoked or perpetuated intense dislike, serious contempt or severe ridicule against the Suruwahá people on the grounds of ... national or ethnic origin ... race [or] religion". It also ruled that the channel was guilty of broadcasting inaccurate material. Seven sought judicial review, but in June 2014 the Federal Court upheld the ruling.

In July–August 2023 when the 2023 FIFA Women's World Cup was hosted by Australia and New Zealand, there was some controversy worldwide about broadcasting rights to it, when broadcasters' offers were very low. FIFA's handling of the rights was also criticised. Seven Network won the rights to broadcast 15 of the matches. These included four round of 16 games, two quarter-finals, the semi-finals, and the final, along with all of the Matildas games. The pay channel Optus Sport has rights for every game in the tournament. This raised public criticism, with many arguing that the entire tournament should be free-to-air, as was the 2022 FIFA World Cup in Qatar, on SBS Television.

In September 2023, a female Queensland contestant in an upcoming Seven Network reality show was charged with multiple counts of indecent treatment of children aged under 16, multiple counts of rape, sexual assault, torture and assaults over a 15-year period. Her partner was also charged with a number of assaults. Seven refused to confirm whether it will cancel or alter the program.

On 14 April 2024, the network was under fire for misidentification of a Jewish student named Ben Cohen as the perpetrator of 2024 Bondi Junction stabbings.

== Former Seven Digital Channels ==
=== PLUS7 ===
PLUS7 logo (2010–2017)

PLUS7 was a catch up TV service run by Seven Network through its Yahoo7 joint venture with Yahoo!. The service became available on 18 January 2010. Following the introduction of 7plus, PLUS7 was shut down, becoming unavailable on most platforms from 12 December 2017, and on remaining devices on 31 March 2018.

Some titles were exclusively available in Australia on PLUS7, including Other Space and Sin City Saints, as well as the British version of My Kitchen Rules, which were not broadcast on Seven Network. In 2014, PLUS7 became the first commercial television catch-up service to provide optional closed captioning on most of its programming.

PLUS7 was available across several platforms including iOS mobile operating systems (e.g. iPhone, iPad & iPod Touch), Apple TV, Xbox 360, Xbox One, PlayStation 3, PlayStation 4, Windows 10, Sony internet-enabled TVs & Blu-ray players, LG internet-enabled TVs, Samsung internet-enabled TVs & Blu-ray players, Panasonic internet-enabled TVs, Hisense internet-enabled TVs, Humax set top boxes, Windows Mobile 7, 8, 8.1 and 10 and Samsung devices running Android OS 4.0+ and above.

=== 7food network ===
7food network was a short-lived Australian free-to-air television channel owned by Seven Network which launched on 1 December 2018. The channel marked the start of Seven's new deal with Discovery, Inc., immediately after the end of SBS's previous deal with Discovery which saw the creation of SBS Food (formerly SBS Food Network) in 2015. The channel featured shows about food and cooking from around the world. The channel ceased broadcasting on 28 December 2019 after garnering lower than expected ratings and was replaced by a HD simulcast of 7mate from 16 January 2020.

== Logo and identity history ==
Seven's colour variant logos used from 1 January 2000 to 13 September 2003.

The network's first logo produced and used across the metropolitan stations in the early 1970s featured the numeral seven inside a ring (similar to the Circle 7 logo used mostly by the American Broadcasting Company for its owned-and-operated stations which ATN-7 used from 1968 to 1969). In some states from as early back as 1967 the "Seven eye" appeared and continued until 1975. Colour television was introduced across the network and the country on 1 March 1975, along with a new logo incorporating a bright ring of the colours of the visual light spectrum. This logo was used nationally until 23 January 1989, when the Seven Network introduced a new red logo with the circle modified to incorporate the "7" (similar to the logo then used by WJLA-TV in Washington). The new logo was rolled out along with evening soap Home and Away and a relaunched Seven Nightly News (later to become Seven News).

The current ribbon logo designed by Cato Brand Partners was launched coinciding the new millennium celebration on 1 January 2000 and the 2000 Summer Olympics held in Sydney. The ribbon logo was used between 2000 and 2003 in five colour variants: red, orange, yellow, green and blue, to symbolise passion, involving, fun, life and energy respectively and represents the five owned and operated capital city television stations of the network. The logo was simplified in 2003, effectively becoming simply two angled trapezoids, losing its gradient, shadows and colour-coded usages to become solid red but first it was used in solid white as an on-screen bug from 2000. In 2012, the Seven logo was slightly modified with the shape of it remaining the same, the upper right corner was lighter red than the remaining logo. On 1 February 2016, it reverted to red trapezoids.

ATN-7:
1963 – 5 October 1970

ATN-7:
5 October 1970 – 28 February 1975
HSV-7:
5 October 1970 – 28 February 1975
BTQ-7
ADS-7: 5 October 1970 – July 1975

ATN-7:
1 March 1975 – 23 January 1989
HSV-7:
1 March 1975 – 23 January 1989
ADS-7:
July 1976 – 27 December 1987
BTQ-7:
July 1976 – 23 January 1989
TVW-7:
October 1975 – 23 January 1989
SAS-7:
27 December 1987 – 23 January 1989

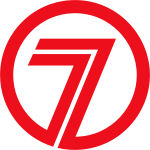
23 January 1989 – 31 December 1999

1 January 2000 – 13 September 2003

14 September 2003 – present

== Slogans ==
Seven Network's TV ad campaigns have often followed NBC due to Seven's historical ties with the American network, but has occasionally used branding from fellow US networks ABC and FOX.

Each state has from time to time had their own specific slogans, but the following were the network's national identities:

- 1959: You're in Tune When You're Tuned to Seven (ADS-7 only)
- 1969 – February 1975: The Seven Revolution
- 1974: Looking Better Than Ever!
- 1975–1976: Seven Colors Your World
- 1976–1979: The Color Machine (a.k.a. Seven Colors Your World/Who Colors Your World?)
- 1979–1980: You're on Seven
- 1981–1982: Channel 7, All the Best
- 1983: Channel 7, Watch Us Now
- 1983: Sevensenational (HSV7 only)
- 1984: Be There (ATN-7/HSV-7 only)
- 1985–1988: Let's All Be There (ATN-7/ADS-7 only)
- 1986–1987: Say Hello (HSV-7/ADS-7/TVW-7 only)
- 1988: Let's Celebrate '88
- 1988: Australian Television Network
- 1 January 1989 – Summer 1989/90: Only the Best on 7
- 1990–1995: Seven
- 1990: In The Mood
- 1991: Yeah!
- 1992: Good Vibrations
- 1993–1994: It Has to Be ... Seven
- 1995: Handmade Television
- February 1995 – June 1996: Discover It All on Seven
- June 1996 – April 1999: Everyone's Home on Seven
- 1 May 1999 – 13 September 2003: The One to Watch
- 2001: The Australian Television Network
- 6 July – 13 September 2003: See Things Differently
- 14 September – November 2003: Lucky Number Seven
- 2004: 7NOW
- 26 December 2004 – 15 January 2011, 4 November 2012 – December 2019: Gottaloveit
- 16 January 2011 – 3 November 2012: One Place
- 2020–2022: Better Together
- 2023: That's Massive

== See also ==
- List of Australian television series
- 7two
- 7mate
- 7Bravo
- 7flix
- TVSN
- Racing.com
- Red Heart, a joint venture with Granada plc
