= STQ =

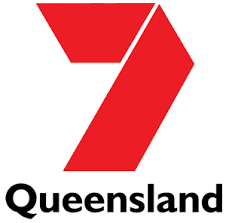
- Regional Queensland; Australia
- Channels: Digital: see table below
- Branding: Seven Queensland

Programming
- Language: English
- Network: Seven

Ownership
- Owner: Seven Media Group; (Channel Seven Queensland Pty Limited)

History
- First air date: 10 April 1965
- Former call signs: WBQ-8 (Wide Bay/Burnett); MVQ-6 (Mackay); SEQ-8 (Wide Bay/Burnett)
- Former affiliations: Independent (1965–1990)
- Call sign meaning: Sunshine Television Queensland

Technical information
- Licensing authority: Australian Communications and Media Authority
- ERP: see table below
- HAAT: see table below
- Transmitter coordinates: see table below

Links
- Website: 7plus.com.au

STQ is an Australian television station, licensed to, and serving the regional areas of Queensland. The station is owned and operated by the Seven Network from studios located in Maroochydore on the Sunshine Coast. The callsign STQ stands for Sunshine Television, Queensland.

== History ==
The station began in the 1960s as two different operators:

- WBQ-8 Wide Bay/Maryborough, starting on 10 April 1965
- MVQ-6 Mackay, starting on 9 August 1968

The licence to operate the commercial television service for the Wide Bay-Burnett region, was awarded to Wide Bay-Burnett Television in October 1962. The company's shareholders included local radio and print media outlets as well as theatre owners Birch, Carroll and Coyle.

The station's studios in the Maryborough suburb of Granville housed three studios plus an outdoor space for special presentations. At the time of its launch, WBQ-8 scheduled around 36 hours of programming a week and within two years this had increased to 45 hours per week, including extended hours on Wednesday afternoons.

Although MVQ-6 was launched on 9 August 1968, its history dates back to March 1960, when Mackay Television Development Pty Ltd was formed. Maitland Low, general manager of local radio station 4MK, was appointed company manager.

Mackay Television Development Pty Ltd was granted the licence in September 1963. The Mackay licence was one of twenty commercial licences granted as part of the fourth stage of the nationwide rollout of commercial television.

The station was based at studios in Victoria Street, Mackay, and incorporated into new premises planned for radio 4MK. MVQ-6 aired its first test pattern transmissions on the evening of Friday 2 August 1968, giving the station's engineers and local viewers a week to make sure all was working before the official opening a week later.

WBQ changed its callsign in 1977 to SEQ (as in South East Queensland), and its on-air name to "SEQ Sunshine Television", with its slogan Leading the Way. MVQ also changed its on-air name in 1982 to "Tropical Television". The stations were long time broadcaster of Seven Network programs, as well as of Brisbane's Seven News edition on BTQ.

In 1987, after earlier buying SEQ-8, Christopher Skase‘s Qintex Limited, made an offer to buy MVQ-6 which was accepted by the MVQ shareholders. Skase was in the process of selling TVQ-0 in Brisbane as he had also just bought the Seven Network stations in Sydney, Melbourne and Brisbane. This gave MVQ-6 and its new sister station, SEQ-8, access to the Seven Network.

When the regional Queensland television market was aggregated at the end of 1990, SEQ-8 and MVQ-6 operationally merged to become the Sunshine Television Network, and thus became the regional Queensland affiliate of the Seven Network. Sunshine changed the call sign to STQ and adopted its new slogan Love You Queensland with a matching jingle that was based on BTQ's Love You Brisbane from the 1980s. Sunshine also reformatted its news service to match its partner network and a new logo also debuted with the on-air presentation similar to Seven's.

The collapse of Christopher Skase's Qintex empire then saw Sunshine Television Network transfer ownership to Gosford Communications in 1992. In 1995, Reg Grundy's RG Capital lodged an initial $89million bid for the company which was rejected by Sunshine's board. A revised offer of $105 million was lodged and backed by Sunshine's chairman Trevor Kennedy, however RG Capital's plans were halted when News Corp then purchased a 15% stake in Sunshine Television. Another Seven affiliate, Prime Television, then snapped up 19.9% of Sunshine Television before the Seven Network made a full offer which was successful. This led to Sunshine Television Network changing its name to Seven Queensland and taking on the same logo and on-air look as the Seven Network.

With a few exceptions, its schedule since then has been virtually identical to that of its metropolitan counterpart, BTQ in Brisbane. Seven Queensland won the annual audience ratings for the first time in 1998 against WIN and Southern Cross Ten and has consistently dominated the ratings since.

Prior to August 2017, Seven Queensland was the only regional broadcaster to broadcast 7flix. This was due to Seven West Media owning the network.

Seven Queensland was also the only regional broadcaster that broadcast the now defunct channel 7food network.

On 26 November 2018, STQ switched the main channel from SD to MPEG-2 HD.

== News ==
Seven News broadcast local bulletins each weeknight at 6 pm, in all seven regional areas: Cairns, Townsville, Mackay, Wide Bay, Toowoomba, the Sunshine Coast and Rockhampton. They are followed by a shortened 30-minute version of Seven News Brisbane.

The bulletins are presented by Joanne Desmond, with Nathan Spurling co-anchoring the Cairns, Townsville, Rockhampton and Toowoomba editions. Sport is presented by Nathan Spurling and weather is presented by Livio Regano. Fill-in presenters include Emily Steinhardt and Adam Straney (news), Luke McGarry and Saavanah Bourke (sport), Rebekah Jensen (weather).

Reporters and camera crews are based at newsrooms in each of the seven regions with studio presentation for the Cairns, Townsville, Mackay, Darling Downs, Rockhampton and Wide Bay bulletins pre-recorded in Maroochydore. The Sunshine Coast edition of Seven News is broadcast live, but may also exchange it to any of the six pre-recorded regions at certain circumstances (e.g., cyclone coverage in the nearest region of immediate concern). News editing is undertaken by the local newsrooms, and sent to the main Maroochydore studios for transmission.

The most successful edition of Seven Local News is broadcast on the Sunshine Coast. In early 1998, WIN Television launched a competing service publicly stating that it would beat Seven in the ratings within six months. At the end of the 1998 ratings season, after a new station head (Laurie Patton) had overseen a comprehensive re-vamping of the program and its external promotions, Seven Local News had actually increased its audience share by six ratings points.

In early 2004, Seven Local News was re-introduced in the Townsville and Cairns sub-markets as a result of regulations regarding local content on regional television introduced by the Australian Broadcasting Authority.

On 5 March 2007, Seven Local News bulletins commenced production and broadcasts in a widescreen standard-definition digital format. Seven Local News was the first regional news service in regional Queensland to convert to widescreen.

On 22 November 2010, Seven Local News launched a sixth edition for the Rockhampton/Gladstone and Central Queensland region.

On 2 November 2015, Seven Local News launched a seventh edition for the Toowoomba and the Darling Downs region. With the said launch, Seven News became the only news service to cover all regional centres of Queensland since the axing of WIN News in the Mackay region in May 2015. This lasted until July 2017, when rival Nine News began to roll out local composite bulletins for their statewide affiliate Southern Cross Television (which carried Nine programming from July 2016 until July 2021). When the composite Nine News bulletins for Mackay and Toowoomba/Darling Downs were axed on 15 February 2019, Seven News once again became the only news service to cover all regional centres of Queensland.

From 11 July 2016, these editions are consolidated with the Seven News branding, though the openers of these editions remained to address as Seven Local News. The Local News branding was completely phased out on 5 September 2016 in favour of the Seven News brand.

Formerly, there were two bureaus located in Hervey Bay and Gladstone covering their respective regions, but they were closed due to budget reasons.

Fill-in Weather Presenter Rosanna Natoli left the Seven Network after getting elected Mayor of Sunshine Coast Region on 16 March 2024.

== Main Transmitters ==
Region served	City	Channels (Analog/ Digital)	First air date	ERP (Analog/ Digital)	HAAT (Analog/ Digital)^{1}	Transmitter coordinates	Transmitter location
Cairns	Cairns	33 (UHF)^{4} 11 (VHF)	31 December 1990	400 kW; 50 kW	1176 m 1190 m	17°15′51″S 145°51′14″E	Mount Bellenden Ker
Darling Downs	Toowoomba	35 (UHF)^{4} 34 (UHF)	31 December 1990	1300 kW; 500 kW	515 m 520 m	26°53′28″S 151°36′18″E (analog); 26°53′27″S 151°36′21″E (digital)	Mount Mowbullan
Mackay^{2}	Mackay	6 (VHF)^{4} 9A (VHF)	9 August 1968	360 kW; 90 kW	613 m 613 m	21°1′56″S 148°56′36″E	Mount Blackwood
Rockhampton	Rockhampton	31 (UHF)^{4} 38 (UHF)	31 December 1990	2000 kW; 500 kW	523 m 523 m	23°43′48″S 150°32′9″E	Mount Hopeful
Southern Downs	Warwick	33 (UHF)^{4} 51 (UHF)	31 December 1990	600 kW; 500 kW	301 m 316 m	28°32′9″S 151°49′58″E	Passchendaele, Queensland
Townsville	Townsville	34 (UHF)^{4} 38 (UHF)	31 December 1990	200 kW; 200 kW	617 m 644 m	19°20′36″S 146°46′50″E	Mount Stuart
Wide Bay^{3}	Maryborough	8 (VHF)^{4} 7 (VHF)	10 April 1965	200 kW; 60 kW	646 m 646 m	25°25′37″S 152°7′3″E	Mount Goonaneman

== Notes ==
- 1. height above average terrain
- 2. The Mackay station was an independent station with the callsign MVQ from its 1968 sign-on until aggregation in 1990.
- 3. The Wide Bay station was an independent station with the callsign WBQ from its 1968 sign-on until 1978, and then SEQ until aggregation in 1990.
- 4. Analogue transmissions ceased on 6 December 2011, as part of the national shutdown of analogue television.
