= AMV (TV station) =

- Regional Victoria; Australia
- Channels: Digital: see table below
- Branding: Seven

Programming
- Language: English
- Network: Seven

Ownership
- Owner: Seven Media Group; (Prime Television (Victoria) Pty Ltd)
- Sister stations: PTV, see below

History
- First air date: 7 September 1964
- Former channel number: see table below
- Former affiliations: Independent (1964–1992)
- Call sign meaning: Albury, Murray, Victoria

Technical information
- Licensing authority: Australian Communications & Media Authority
- ERP: see table below
- HAAT: see table below
- Transmitter coordinates: see table below

Links
- Website: 7regional.com.au

AMV is an Australian television station licensed to, and serving the regions surrounding Wagga Wagga and Albury–Wodonga in south western New South Wales and north eastern Victoria. The station was, for many years, merged with RVN-2 as the Riverina and North East Victoria Television Service.

== History ==
=== Origins and license history ===
AMV-4 commenced broadcasting on 7 September 1964. It broadcast programming from the three commercial stations in Sydney (ATN-7, TCN-9 and TEN-10) alongside local programming including coverage of the Albury Gold Cup, the Ovens and Murray Football League Grand Final and the 1988 Miss Australia pageant. The station has continuously produced a half-hour regional news program on weeknights, currently known as Seven News, with local news and sports reports produced in Albury but aired in bulletins put together at Seven’s Canberra headquarters.

The company to operate the station, Albury-Upper Murray TV Limited, was awarded its broadcasting licence on 4 October 1962. Principal shareholders in the company included Amalgamated Wireless Australasia, Hoyts, The Border Morning Mail newspaper and other local businesses — complying with the requirement that at least 50 per cent of the company's shareholding must be locally based.

=== RVN's origins prior to going on air ===
When the commercial television license for the Riverina area was being determined, a number of local groups submitted proposals. Young-based radio station 2LF, along with local councils and businesses in the Young-Cootamundra area, Wagga Wagga newspaper The Daily Advertiser and radio station 2WG, together with local Wagga Wagga businessmen, as well as a group of smaller newspapers and some licensed clubs.

2LF's proposal later joined forces with the Advertiser–2WG bid — 2LF would get 10 per cent of the shares, 2WG got 20 per cent and The Advertiser got 15 per cent, with the remaining shares to be offered to local people. After issues at the Australian Broadcasting Control Board enquiry for the license, the 2LF–2WG–Advertiser group (trading as Riverina Television) won the license.

The initial board was made up representatives from 2WG, 2LF, The Daily Advertiser, and two local councils. A few days after the license was announced, the chairman and station manager had a disagreement, resulting in the resignation of both. They were replaced by Wal Hucker, who ran a film animation and sound company in Sydney and was also the former chairman's brother-in-law. The former chairman's wife also joined the board, as the Control Board made it clear that 2WG had to remain involved in the station. Bill Marsden, of 2LF, became the station manager.

A disagreement with the Wagga Wagga city council over the location of a potential studio site, which would have provided direct line of sight transmission to the Mount Ulandra transmitter, saw a new site rezoned from residential areas.

As with most stations launching at that time, the mast would be shared with the local transmitter of the ABC, but not the transmitting facilities, as chief engineer Stuart McDonald wanted to operate the facilities remotely. RVN would be the first station to operate their transmitters in this way. The studios were completed in early 1964, after construction started on 31 July 1963.

=== Early broadcasting ===
RVN opened transmission on 19 June 1964, at 7pm, to much anticipation by the people of the Riverina and South-West Slopes. Prior to the opening of RVN-2, many in the Riverina needed marketing advice of purchasing their television sets and installing their aerials in advance to a any last minute demands, while others who did not own television sets were invited to view them from shopfronts. The opening night's programming of RVN included an announcement from the area's then local Federal Member, footage of the station's construction, a five minute news bulletin with newsreader Paul Griffiths, the feature film, The Dambusters at 9:05pm and The Jack Benny Program. AMV-4 Albury opened transmission for the first time at 4:55pm on 7 September 1964, with Cohns Cobbers’ Teleclub. Before the official opening at 7:16pm titled Were You There — with AMV, the other programmes were Captain Gallant at 6pm, Calvin and the Colonel at 6:30pm, On Target with Ross Sellars at 6:55pm and ABC News from ABV-2 at 7pm. After the opening, the programs were Bonanza at 8:30pm, the 1954 movie Lucky Me at 9:30pm and Mike Hammer at 11:15pm. The station closed down for the night at 11:35pm.

As with most stations at the time, news was done by announcing over slides, or read to the camera, combined with the previous night's news film from ATN-7 Sydney. Local programming, including commercials, was broadcast live. RVN was the only station to have made a profit, albeit a small one, in its first year of operation.

=== RVN-AMV ===
By the early 1970s, many regional stations faced financial difficulties, and as a result RVN and AMV planned to merge to form the Riverina and North East Victoria Television Service Pty Ltd, in 1971. The stations were known on-air as RVN-AMV. Both stations were programmed separately, until 1976 when transmission for both stations was centralised in Wagga Wagga.

In 1983, the stations faced a unique situation when New South Wales and Victoria ended daylight saving periods at different times. For three weeks, RVN's output was shown on AMV on a one-hour delay. It was also unusual in that it served audiences in two states, and had to program accordingly. New South Wales viewers in the Riverina received Sydney news and sports, primarily rugby league, while viewers in North East Victoria were shown Melbourne news and sports (mainly Australian Football League [AFL; previously VFL]).

By the mid-1980s, 80 people were employed at Wagga, and a further 40 in Albury.

=== Prime/Ramcorp ===
RVN-AMV was purchased by Paul Ramsay's Ramcorp Ltd. in 1987, and merged with the MidState Television network, forming Prime Television. RVN and AMV split up in 1989, when Southern New South Wales was aggregated – RVN joined with CBN, as the Seven Network affiliate in the area in competition with Ten Capital and WIN Television. AMV, meanwhile expanded into the rest of Victoria as the state's Seven Network affiliate, in competition with Vic TV and Southern Cross.

RVN's callsign ceased to exist in 1991, when the Wagga Wagga and Orange licenses were merged to become only CBN. At the same time, AMV moved from VHF channel 4 to VHF channel 11, in order to allow FM stations to be established without interference from existing television stations (using VHF channels 3, 4, 5 and 5A).

In preparation for aggregation of the Victorian market – (excluding Mildura) – in early 1992, a studio facility and playout centre was constructed in the Ballarat suburb of Mitchell Park. At that time this facility was the playout centre for the Western Victoria, Central Victoria, and Gippsland regions. Playout for the Albury and Shepparton regions was maintained at Prime's Albury studios. The Ballarat centre was and continues to be operated under the AMV licence.

The station celebrated its 50th anniversary in September 2014, at its now former Union Road studios.

The station moved to studios in Dean Street, Albury in April 2015.

== Seven News ==
AMV produces and broadcasts a 30-minute Seven News bulletin for the Albury–Wodonga border and North East Victoria regional market each weeknight at 6:00pm co-presented by Madelaine Collignon and Nick Hose in Canberra introducing news and sports reports from Seven's Albury-based reporters. Kirstie Fitzpatrick is the bulletin's weather presenter. It is followed by a shortened 30-minute version of Seven's main 6pm bulletin from Melbourne at 6:30pm. The new news arrangement took place on 24 February 2014, over a month after Seven News extended its flagship bulletins in Australia's east coast metropolitan markets to a full hour as a result of axing current affairs programme Today Tonight (which the Border sub-market does not carry). Albury is in NSW, just over the border from the Victorian city of Wodonga. AMV takes its programs from Seven Melbourne under the Victoria broadcast market, with Albury much closer to Melbourne than it is to Sydney.

Throughout the station's history, local news under various names were produced and broadcast from studios at 570 Union Road in Lavington in Albury's north. In the 2000s, then owner Prime Media began closing most of its regional studios, citing upgrade costs. Albury however was not cut and in late 2010 was upgraded to digital equipment. However, just two months after the upgrade, Prime Media announced it would be ending local programming from its Union Road, Albury studios, and instead transfer production to the company's headquarters in Canberra; its final local presentation was produced in March 2011. The studios were converted to a church several years later in 2016, however the last local news presenter, Helen Ballard, moved to the newly-established newsroom in Albury as a reporter.

In the Ballarat, Bendigo and Gippsland regional markets, two-minute updates are presented by Pip Waller, with weather forecasts from Daniel Gibson.

== Main transmitters ==
Region served	City	Channels Analog (Digital)	First air date	ERP Analog (Digital)	HAAT Analog (Digital) (Note: Height above average terrain (HAAT) estimated using EHAAT from the ITU SRTM3 database here: "Calculation of Effective antenna heights using the SRTM3 database". ITU SRTM3 database. ITU International Telecommunications Union | ITU–R: ITU Radiocommunication.)	Transmitter Coordinates Analog (Digital)	Transmitter Location
Ballarat	Ballarat	33 UHF (Note: Analogue transmissions ceased as of 5 May 2011 as part of the conversion to digital television) (36 UHF)	March 1992	(2000 kW (300 kW)	663 m (713 m)	37°16′57″S 143°14′52″E	Lookout Hill
Bendigo	Bendigo	32 UHF (31 UHF)	March 1992	2000 kW (550 kW)	517 m (496 m)	36°59′32″S 144°18′30″E (digital 36°59′26″S 144°18′32″E)	Mount Alexander (transmitter damaged in Victorian bushfires, off-air since 9th January 2026)
Goulburn Valley	Shepparton	43 UHF (34 UHF)	March 1992	1200 kW (225 kW)	377 m (378 m)	36°21′29″S 145°41′42″E	Mount Major
Latrobe Valley	Traralgon	46 UHF (33 UHF)	March 1992	1000 kW (250 kW)	515 m (487 m)	38°23′57″S 146°33′53″E; (digital 38°23′37″S 146°33′34″E)	Mount Tassie
Murray River Valley	Swan Hill	47 UHF (48 UHF)	March 1992	400 kW (220 kW)	179 m (201 m)	35°28′24″S 143°27′20″E	Goschen
Victorian Upper Murray; (Upper Hume region)	Albury	11 VHF (Note: The Victorian Upper Murray station was on VHF channel 4 from its 1964 sign-on until 1991, moving to its current channel in order to accommodate FM radio) (12 VHF)	7 September 1964	250 kW (75 kW)	525 m (525 m)	36°15′13″S 146°51′20″E	Mount Baranduda
Western Victoria		34 UHF (12 VHF)	March 1992	200 kW (15 kW)	335 m (365 m)	37°27′32″S 141°54′58″E; (digital 37°27′32″S 141°54′57″E)	Mount Dundas

== PTV Mildura ==
PTV
- Mildura & Sunraysia; Australia
- Channels: Digital: 6 (VHF); Virtual: 6
- Branding: Seven

Programming
- Language: English
- Affiliations: Seven (O&O)

Ownership
- Owner: Seven Media Group; (Prime Television (Victoria) Pty Ltd)
- Sister stations: AMV
More Information
History
First air date	1 July 1997
Former channel numbers	Analog: 32 (UHF) (1997–2010); Digital: 31 (UHF) (2003–2014)
Call sign meaning	Prime; Television; Victoria
Technical information
Licensing authority	Australian Communications and Media Authority
ERP	50 kW
HAAT	164 m (both) (Note: HAAT estimated from https://www.itu.int/SRTM3/ using EHAAT.)
Transmitter coordinates	34°22′47″S 142°11′18″E

PTV is an Australian television station licensed to, and serving the regions surrounding Mildura, Victoria. The station commenced transmissions in 1997, after Prime Television won the second television licence for Mildura, a non-aggregated market, in competition with WIN Television, for a cost of $3.2 million, in October 1996. The licence is held by Prime Television (Victoria) Pty Ltd, the licensee of AMV.

Analogue transmission ceased on 30 June 2010 as part of the national conversion to digital television.

=== Seven News ===
In the Mildura regional market, short one-to-two-minute news and weather updates are presented by rotating presenters. These updates were launched in early 2024 after Seven was found to be in breach of local content requirements in November 2023; their acquisition of Prime in December 2021 triggered new local content requirements in the Mildura regional market. The absence of local content went unnoticed for 16 months beyond the 6-month grace period following the acquisition.
