= List of programs broadcast by Seven Network =

This is a list of programs that have been broadcast by the Seven Network / 7HD, 7two, 7mate, 7Bravo, 7flix and Racing.com as well as regional and remote stations, as well as catch-up services 7plus. Some regional and remote stations have alternate schedules and may air programs at different times.

== Currently broadcast on Seven Network ==
=== Domestic ===
==== News and current affairs ====
- Local productions
  - Seven News – Live and Fast-Tracked nightly evening bulletins produced locally in Sydney/Melbourne/Brisbane/Adelaide/Perth/Regional NSW and ACT/Regional QLD/Regional Victoria/Regional Western Australia/Tasmania
  - Seven Afternoon News (Seven News at 4) – Exclusive weekdays 4 pm – 5 pm, produced locally in Sydney/Melbourne/Brisbane/Adelaide/Perth (2013–present)
- National programs produced in Sydney
  - Sunrise Early News – weekdays 5 am – 5:30 am (2008–present)
  - Seven’s National News At Noon – Exclusive weekdays 12 pm – 1 pm (2004–2025)
  - The Latest: Seven News – Exclusive weeknights 10:30 pm – 11 pm (2018–2024)
  - Seven News at 5 – Exclusive weekends 5 pm – 5:30 pm (2015–present)
  - Sunrise – Live weekdays 5:30am – 9 am (1991–1999, 2000–present)
  - Weekend Sunrise – Live weekends 7 am – 10 am (2005–present)
  - The Morning Show – Exclusive weekdays 9 am – 11:30 am, weekends 10 am – 12 pm (2007–present)

==== Drama ====
- Home and Away (1988–present)
- RFDS (TV series) (2021, 2023–)

==== Comedy ====
- Roast Night (2024–present) on 7mate
- Darradong Local Council (2023–present) on 7mate
- Fat Pizza: Back in Business (2000–2007 on SBS, 2019–present on 7mate)

==== Reality ====
- Australian Idol (2023–present)
- Dancing with the Stars (2004–2015, 2021–)
- Dream Home (2024)
- The Farmer Wants a Wife (2020–present)
- My Kitchen Rules (2010–2020, 2022–present)
- The Voice (2021–present)
- Made in Bondi (2024)
- Stranded on Honeymoon Island (2025)

==== Observational / documentaries ====
- Australia: Now and Then (2021–present)
- Border Security: Australia's Front Line (2004–present)
- Code 1: Minute by Minute (2022)
- Manhunt (2017–present)
- Outback Truckers (2012–present on 7mate)
- Strike Force (2022)
- Surveillance Oz (2012–present)
- Surveillance Oz: Dash Cam (2016–present)
- Towies (2017–present on 7mate)
- Undercurrent (2019–present)

==== Game shows ====
- The 1% Club (2023–present)
- The Chase Australia (2015–present)

==== Lifestyle ====
- A Moveable Feast (Victoria) (2017–present)
- Australia's Best Houses (2013–present on 7two)
- Better Homes and Gardens (1995–present)
- Cosmetic Coffee (2017–present)
- Creek to Coast (Queensland) (2002–present)
- The Franchise Show (2016–present)
- The Great Australian Doorstep (2013–present on 7two)
- Great Day Out (Queensland) (2017–present) – formally called The Great South East
- The Great Weekend (Victoria) (2019–present)
- Helloworld (2019–present)
- Home in WA (Western Australia) (2000–present)
- House of Wellness (2017–present)
- The Intolerant Cooks (2015–present on 7two)
- Kochie's Business Builders (2009–present)
- Melbourne Weekender (Victoria) (2006–present)
- Queensland Weekender (Queensland) (2003–present)
- SA Weekender (South Australia) (2017–present)
- Sydney Weekender (New South Wales) (1994–present)
- Vasili's Garden (2002–2007, 2008–2013 on Channel 31, 2007 on SBS, 2016–present on 7two)
- WA Weekender (Western Australia) (2014–present)

==== Sports talk ====
- Talking Footy (1994–2004, 2013–2020, 2023–2024)
- Armchair Experts (2018–present)
- The Front Bar (2015 on AFL.com.au, 2016–present on Seven/7mate)
- The Kick (2012–2016 as "Toyota Saturday Pre-Game", 2017–present on Seven/7mate)
- Sunday Footy Fest (2021–present)
- The Agenda Setters: AFL (2025-present)
- The Agenda Setters: Rugby League (2026-present)

==== Sports ====
- American football: NFL and Super Bowl (2015–present on 7mate)
- Australian rules football: AFL Premiership Season including AFL Grand Final and Brownlow Medal (1957–1986, 1988–2001, 2007–present on Seven and 7mate)
- Australian rules football: AFLW (Women's AFL) (2017–present on Seven & 7mate)
- Australian rules football: SANFL, VFL and WAFL (2015–present)
- Cricket: all domestic Test matches and all domestic Women's Internationals (2018–present)
- Cricket: KFC Big Bash League (2018–present) and Rebel Women's Big Bash League (2018–present)
- Cycling: Tour Down Under (2019–present)
- Golf: Australian Open (1989–2008, 2012–present)
- Golf: Australian PGA Championship (2014–present)
- Seven's Horse Racing coverage (2005–present in Seven & 7mate):
  - Melbourne Spring Racing Carnival (2002–2006, 2013–present on Seven and 7two)
  - Autumn Racing Carnival
  - Magic Millions
- Motor racing: Repco Supercars Championship (1963–1996, 2007–2014, 2021–present) including Bathurst 1000 (1963–1996, 2007–2014, 2021–present)
- Summer Olympic Games: Tokyo 2020 (2021 on Seven, 7two and 7mate)
- Swimming: Australian Swimming Championships and Pan Pacific Swimming Championships (2016–2020 on Seven and 7two)
- Yachting: Sydney to Hobart Yacht Race (2005–present)

==== Annual events ====
- Woolworths Carols in the Domain (1982–present)
- Good Friday Appeal (1957–present) (Melbourne only)
- Logie Awards (2023–present)
- Perth Telethon (1968–present) (Perth only)
- Schools Spectacular (1984–2012 on ABC, 2013–2015 on Nine, 2016–2019 and 2021–present on Seven)
- Victorian State Schools Spectacular (Melbourne only)
- NSW Schools Spectacular Remixed (2020 on Seven) (Sydney only)

=== Foreign ===
==== Soap opera ====
- Coronation Street (2022–present on 7two)
- Emmerdale (2022–present on 7two)
- Shortland Street (2023-present on 7plus)

==== Drama ====
- 9-1-1
- 9-1-1: Lone Star
- Accused
- The Blacklist
- Chicago Fire
- God Friended Me
- The Good Doctor
- How To Get Away With Murder (7flix)
- Miss Scarlet and The Duke (7plus)
- Proven Innocent (7plus)
- Quantum Leap (2022 series)
- The Resident
- Scandal (7flix)

==== Comedy ====
- St. Denis Medical

==== Reality ====
- The Amazing Race
- America's Got Talent
- American Pickers (7mate)
- Britain's Got Talent
- Hardcore Pawn (7mate)
- Hotel Hell
- Ink Master (7mate)
- Pawn Stars (7mate)
- Starstruck
- Swamp People (7mate)

==== Lifestyle ====
- 60 Minute Makeover (7two)
- Bargain Hunt (7two)
- Escape to the Country (7two)
- Homes Under the Hammer (7two)
- Mums at the Table (7two)

==== Factual ====
- River Monsters (7two)

==== Annual events ====
- Academy Awards (2020–present)

==== Religious ====
- Life Today with James Robison (7two)
- It Is Written
- Tomorrow's World
- Leading The Way
- David Jeremiah

== Upcoming series ==
=== Domestic ===
==== 2025 ====
- Jim Jeffries and Friends (Standup)
- The Rise And Fall Of Kings Cross (Doco)

==== 2026 ====
- First Dates (2016–20, Network Ten 2022)
- Caught in the Middle (quiz show)
- Glenn & Mick’s Celebrity Intervention (comedy)- 20 April
- My Reno Rules (reality) - April 21
- SAS: Australia vs England celebrities (reality)
- Once In A Lifetime (lifestyle)
- Tina Arena: Unravel Me (doco special)
- Live It Up: The Mental As Anything Story (Doco)

==== 2027 ====
- I'm a Celebrity...Get Me Out of Here! (formerly Network 10, 2015-2026)

==== TBA ====
- The Rich House (reality)

=== Foreign ===
- Alert (drama)
- Litvinenko (drama)
- Lopez vs Lopez (comedy)
- Without Sin (drama)
- A Year on Planet Earth

== Formerly broadcast ==
=== Domestic ===
==== News and current affairs ====
- 11AM (1975–99)
- The All In Call (for 7HD) (2009)
- The Daily Edition (2013–20)
- Face to Face (1995–97)
- Hinch (1987–91)
- News Overnight (1985)
- Newsworld (1982–89)
- Real Life (1992–94, became Today Tonight from 1995)
- Seven News At 7 on 7Two (2013–14)
- Sunday Night (2009–19)
- Terry Willesee Tonight (1981–88)
- Today Tonight (East Coast) (2002–14)
- Today Tonight (Sydney, Melbourne versions) (1995–2002, replaced by East Coast Edition)
- Today Tonight (Queensland) (1995–2003, 2013–14)
- Today Tonight (Adelaide and Perth versions) (1995–2019)

==== Drama ====
- 800 Words (2015–2018)
- Against the Wind (1978)
- All Saints (1998–2009)
- Always Greener (2001–2003)
- Australian Gangster (2021)
- The Battlers (1994)
- Between Two Worlds (2020)
- Bony (1992)
- The Blake Mysteries (2013-2017 on ABC, 2018 on Seven)
- Blue Heelers (1994–2006)
- Blue Murder: Killer Cop (2017)
- Catching Milat (2015)
- City Homicide (2007–2011)
- The Claremont Murders
- Con Girl (2023)
- Cop Shop (1977–1984) (moved to WIN)
- A Country Practice (1981–1994)
- Fam Time (2021)
- Fire (1995–1996)
- Flair (1990)
- Hatton Garden (2021)
- headLand (2005–2006)
- Hoges: The Paul Hogan Story (2017)
- Homicide (1964–1977) (moved to WIN)
- INXS: Never Tear Us Apart (2014)
- The Killing Field (2014)
- Last Man Standing (2005)
- Marshall Law (2002)
- Molly (2016)
- Ms Fisher's Modern Murder Mysteries (2019)
- Murder Uncovered (2017)
- Neighbours (1985 on Seven, 1986–2010 on Ten, 2011–2022 on 10 Peach)
- Olivia: Hopelessly Devoted to You (2018)
- Over the Hill (1994–1995)
- Packed to the Rafters (2008–2013)
- Peter Allen: Not The Boy Next Door (2015)
- A Place To Call Home (2013–2014 on Seven, 2015–present on Foxtel)
- The Power, The Passion (1989)
- Secret Bridesmaids' Business (2019)
- The Secret Daughter (2016–2017)
- Skirts (1990)
- Sons and Daughters (1982–1987)
- Young Ramsay (1977–1980) (moved to WIN)
- Wanted (2016–2018)
- Wild Boys (2011)
- Winter (2015)

==== Comedy ====
- Acropolis Now (1989–1992)
- The Australian Roast Of John Cleese (2024)
- Big Bite (2004)
- Big Girl's Blouse (1994)
- Birds in the Bush (1972)
- Bobby Dazzler (1977–1978)
- Bogan Hunters (2014–2015 on 7mate)
- Brass Monkeys (1983)
- Bullpitt! (1997–1998)
- The Comedy Sale (1993)
- The D-Generation (1988–1989)
- Daily at Dawn (1981)
- Doctor Down Under (1979–1980)
- Double Take (2009)
- The Eleventh Hour (1985)
- Fam Time (2021)
- Fast Forward (1989–1992)
- Full Frontal (1993–1997)
- Hamish and Andy (2004)
- Hampton Court (1991)
- Hey Dad..! (1987–1994)
- Housos vs Virus: The Lockdown (2020 on 7mate)
- Housos: The Thong Warrior (2022 on 7mate)
- Jimeoin (1994–1995)
- Kath & Kim (2002–04 on ABC, 2007)
- Kingswood Country (1980–1984)
- Kinne (2014–2015 on 7mate)
- Let Loose Live (2005)
- Newlyweds (1993–1994)
- Orange Is the New Brown (2018)
- TV Burp (2009)
- We Interrupt This Broadcast (2023)

==== Animation ====
- Regular Old Bogan (2020 on 7mate)

==== Variety / Entertainment ====
- Andrew Denton's Interview (2018–2019)
- At Home with John Mangos (1994–1995)
- The Bert Newton Show (1989)
- Behave Yourself! (2017)
- Best Bits (2016)
- The Big Music Quiz (2016)
- The Chat Room (2003)
- Denise (1998–2001)
- Denton (1994–1995)
- The Eric Bana Show Live (1997)
- Funniest People (1995)
- Greeks On The Roof (2004)
- Kidspeak (1998)
- Late Night with Jono and Dano (1986)
- Little Big Shots (2017–2018)
- The Mavis Bramston Show (1964-1967)
- Mesmerised (2015)
- Mulray (1994–1995)
- The Naked Vicar Show (1977–1978)
- The Night Cap (2008 via 7HD)
- The Norman Gunston Show (1975–1979, 1993)
- Out of the Question (2008)
- Pictures of You (2012)
- SlideShow (2013)
- Thank God You're Here (2006–2007, 2023– on Ten, 2009)
- This is Your Laugh (2008 via 7HD)
- Tonight Live with Steve Vizard (1990–1993)
- The Unbelievable Truth (2012)
- The White Room (2010)
- You May Be Right (2006)

==== Reality ====
- 10 Years Younger in 10 Days (2009)
- All Together Now (2018)
- The Amazing Race Australia (2011–2014, 2019–present on Network 10)
- Aussie Barbecue Heroes (2015)
- Australia's Got Talent (2007–2022 on Seven, on Nine,)
- Australian Spartan (2018–2019)
- Back with the Ex (2018)
- Battle of the Choirs (2008)
- Beauty and the Geek Australia (2009–2012)
- The Big Adventure (2014)
- Blow Up (2023)
- Bride & Prejudice (2017–2019)
- Bringing Sexy Back (2014)
- Celebrity Splash! (2013)
- Celebrity Survivor (2006) (Australian Survivor franchise transferred to Network 10 from 2016)
- The Club (2002)
- Dance Boss (2018)
- Dancing with the Stars (2004–2015 on Seven, 2019–present on Ten)
- First Dates (2016–2020)
- Formal Wars (2013)
- Hell's Kitchen Australia (2017)
- Holey Moley (2021)
- House Rules (2013–2020)
- How Much Do You Love Me? (2000)
- Instant Hotel (2017–2019)
- It Takes Two (2006–2009)
- Kiss Bang Love (2016)
- Ladies' Night (2019)
- Last Chance Learners (2007)
- Mates on a Mission (2022)
- Make Me A Supermodel (2008)
- The Mentor (2018)
- Million Dollar Island (2023)
- The Mole (2000–2003, 2005, 2013)
- The Real Dirty Dancing (2019)
- The Proposal (2019)
- The Super Switch (2019)
- My Restaurant Rules (2004–2005)
- The One (2008)
- Playing It Straight (2004)
- Plate of Origin (2020)
- Please Marry My Boy (2012–2013)
- Pooch Perfect (2020)
- Popstars (2000–2002)
- Popstars Live (2004)
- Restaurant Revolution (2015)
- Seven Year Switch (2016–2017)
- The Single Wives (2018)
- The X Factor (2005 on Ten, 2010–2016 on Seven)
- Treasure Island (2000 on Seven)
- Ultimate Tag (2021)
- Yummy Mummies (2017 on Seven, 2018 on 7plus)
- Zumbo's Just Desserts (2016, 2019)

==== Lifestyle ====
- Around the World with Manu (2016 on 7TWO)
- Auction Squad (2001–2004)
- The Aussie Property Flippers (2017)
- Australia's Best Backyards (2007)
- Coxy's Big Break (Victoria) (2004–2015)
- Discover Tasmania
- Food 4 Life (2007, 4ME: 2011–)
- Good Chef, Bad Chef (2006–2007) (now on Network Ten)
- The Great Outdoors (1992–2010)
- The Great South East (Queensland) (1997–2016) – Replaced by/Renamed to Great Day Out
- Ground Force (1999–2004)
- Guide to the Good Life
- Harry's Practice (1997–2003)
- House Calls to the Rescue
- New Idea Saturday Kitchen (2004–2006)
- New Idea TV (2008?)
- No Leave, No Life (2009–2012)
- The Outdoor Room (2008)
- Room for Improvement (2000–2003)
- SA Life (South Australia) (2010–2016)
- Surprise Chef (2001–2003)
- Talk to the Animals (1993–1996)
- What Not To Wear Australia (2004)
- Your Life on the Lawn (2003)

==== Observational / documentaries ====
- Air Ways (2009–2011)
- Anh Does (2012–2015)
- Australia: The Story of Us (2015)
- Australia's Cheapest Weddings (2016)
- Beach Cops (2015–2018)
- Beyond 2000 (Seven Network 1985–1993; Network Ten 1993–1998; Seven Network 1999)
- Beyond The Darklands (2009)
- Beyond Tomorrow (2005–2006)
- Bush Doctors (2008)
- Coastwatch Oz (2014)
- Conviction Kitchen (2011)
- Crash Investigation Unit (2008–2011)
- Emergency Call (2018)
- Find My Family (2008–2010)
- The Force: Behind the Line (2006–2019)
- Gangs of Oz (2009)
- Gold Coast Medical (2016–2017)
- Highway Patrol (2009–2019)
- Inside "The G" (2019)
- ICU (2010)
- Last Chance Surgery (2009)
- Medical Emergency (2006–2010)
- Medical Incredible (2005)
- Medical Rookies (2005)
- Motorbike Cops (2018–2019)
- Murder Uncovered (2017)
- My France with Manu (2014–2015)
- My Ireland with Colin (2015)
- Million Dollar Cold Case (2017)
- Outback Wildlife Rescue (2008)
- Police Files: Unlocked (2006–2008)
- The Real Seachange (2006)
- RSPCA Animal Rescue (2007–2012)
- Surf Patrol (2007–2009)
- This Is Your Life (1975–1980, 2022–23)
- Top 40 Celebrity Countdown (2007)
- Triple Zero Heroes (2009)
- What Really Happens in Bali (2014)
- What Really Happens in Thailand (2015)
- Where Are They Now? (2006–2008)
- Wildlife with Olivia Newton-John (1995–1996)
- Jimmy Barnes: Working Class Boy (2018)
- Working Class Man / Cold Chisel Live: 50th Anniversary Tour (Doco)
- The World Around Us (1979–2006)
- World's Strictest Parents (2009–2012)
- Young, Lazy and Driving Us Crazy (2014)
- yourHOUSE (2005)
- You've Got the Job (2006)
- The Zoo (2008–2010)

==== Game shows ====
- All-Star Squares (1999)
- Australia's Brainiest Kid (Seven Network 2004; Network Ten 2005–2007 as Australia's Brainiest)
- Beat The Star (2010)
- Blind Date (1974)
- Blockbusters (1990–1994)
- Cannonball (2017)
- Catch Us If You Can
- Celebrity Tattletales (1980)
- C'mon, Have A Go! (1985–1986)
- Coles £3000 Question and Coles $6000 Question (1960–1971)
- Concentration (1970s, 1997)
- Seven’s Deal Or No Deal (2003–2013)
- Dog Eat Dog (2002–2003)
- The Dulux Show (1957)
- Family Feud (1988–1996)
- Gladiators (1995–1996, 2008)
- Great Temptation (1970–1974)
- Have a Go (1987)
- High Rollers (1975)
- Hot Streak (1998)
- It Pays to Be Funny (1957–1958)
- Jeopardy! (1970–1978)
- Letterbox and $50,000 Letterbox (1963, 1981)
- The Love Game (1984)
- The Main Event (1991–1992)
- Man O Man (1994)
- The Master (2006)
- Midnight Zoo (2006)
- Million Dollar Chance Of A Lifetime (1999–2000)
- Million Dollar Minute (2013–2015)
- Minute to Win It (2010)
- National Bingo Night (2007)
- Now You See It (1985–1996)
- Opportunity Knocks (1977–1978)
- Perfect Match (2002)
- Pick a Box (1957–1971)
- Play Your Cards Right (1984)
- Press Your Luck (1987–1988)
- The Pressure Pak Show (1957–1958)
- The Price is Right (original format) (1957–1959, 1963)
- The New Price is Right (1981–1985)
- The Price is Right (2012–2013)
- Quiz Master (2002)
- The Rich List (2007–2008)
- Stop the Music (1950s)
- Take a Chance (1959)
- Take Me Out (2018)
- Talking Telephone Numbers (1996)
- Total Recall (1994–1995)
- The Trivial Video Show (1986)
- TV Talent Scout (1957–1958)
- Video Village (1962–1966)
- The Wall (2017)
- The Weakest Link (2001–2002)
- Wheel of Fortune: The Original Series (1981–2004, 2006 [unscreened episodes])
- Larry Emdur & Laura Csortan's Wheel of Fortune (2005–2006)
- Who Dares Wins (1996–1998)
- Win Roy and HG's Money (2000)
- Wipeout (1999–2000)

==== Children's ====
- The Adventures of the Bush Patrol (1996–98)
- The Adventures of Candy Claus (1990)
- The Adventures of Long John Silver (1958)
- The DaVincibles (2011–15)
- Agro's Cartoon Connection (1989–97)
- A*mazing (1994–98)
- Backyard Science (2004–10)
- Bailey's Bird (1979)
- Bay City (1993)
- Beat Bugs (2016–25)
- The Big Arvo (2000–04)
- The Big Breakfast (1999–2000)
- Blinky Bill's Around the World Adventure (2004–09) (later on ABC)
- Blinky Bill's White Christmas
- The Book Place (1991–2003, 2010–11 on 7TWO)
- Boris's Breakfast Club (Brisbane only)
- Bottersnikes and Gumbles (2015–16, 2018–20)
- Butterfly Island (1987–93, originally on ABC)
- The Camel Boy
- Carrots
- The Cartoon Connection (1985–89, 1997–99)
- Cartoon Corner
- Castaway (2011–12, 2014)
- Chuck Finn
- Crash Zone (1999–2001, 2008 on 7HD)
- The Deep (2015–20)
- Dive Olly Dive (2005–14)
- Dot and the Kangaroo films
- Drop Dead Weird (2017–19, 2022 on 7flix)
- The Dudley Dog Show (1975)
- Dumb Bunnies
- The Early Birds
- Erky Perky (2006–13)
- Fairy Tale Police Department (2002–07)
- Fat Cat and Friends (1988–92, originally on Network Ten)
- Fix & Foxi and Friends (2001-2009, later on ABC)
- Flipper & Lopaka (later on ABC)
- Flushed (2015–25)
- Funshine (1976–79)
- Get Arty (2017–25)
- Get Clever (2018–25)
- Ghosts of Time (2012–15)
- Girl TV (2003–04, 2008)
- Gloria's House (2000–01)
- Go Go Stop (2004–11)
- The Greatest Tune on Earth (1990–92)
- Gumnutz
- Hairy Legs (2014–18)
- Halfway Across The Galaxy and Turn Left (1992, rerun 1997)
- History Hunters (2013–15, 2017–18 on 7flix)
- In Your Dreams (2013–19)
- It's Academic (2005–25)
- Jolly Gene and His Fun Machine (1957)
- Jungledyret Hugo (2004-2008)
- Kaboodle (1990–93, originally on ABC, returned to air on ABC)
- Kid Detectives (2009–11)
- Kids Only! – KO! (1979)
- Kitty is Not a Cat (2017–20, 2023–25)
- Lab Rats Challenge (2012–15) (originally on Nine Network, later on ABC3)
- Larry the Wonderpup (2018–20)
- Legend of Enyo (2010–13)
- Li'l Horrors (2000–02)
- Marco Polo Junior Versus the Red Dragon (was broadcast on television with a new name called The Magic Medallion)
- Master Raindrop (2008–12)
- Match It (2012–23)
- Mission Top Secret (1991)
- Motown Magic (2019, 2022 on 7flix)
- The New Tomorrow (2005–09)
- News of the Wild (2018–24)
- Oh Yuck! (2017–19, 2023 on 7flix)
- The Quiz Kids (1964–68)
- Romper Room (1963–88)
- Round the Twist (1989, later on ABC)
- Sally Bollywood: Super Detective (2010–17, 2020 on 7flix)
- Saturday Disney (1990–2016)
- Saturdee (1986)
- Scrooge Koala's Christmas (1997)
- Sea Princesses (2007–14)
- Seaside Hotel (2003–09)
- Seven's Super Saturday
- Shirl's Neighbourhood (1979–83)
- Short Cuts (2001)
- Silversun
- Sky Trackers (1994)
- Spit It Out (2010–15, 2017–21 on 7flix)
- Staines Down Drains (2006–10)
- Street Football
- The Super Sunday Show
- Tabaluga (1997–2007)
- Tashi (2014–19)
- Teenage Fairytale Dropouts (2012–17)
- The Three Musketeers
- Time Masters (1996–98)
- Time Trackers (2008–11)
- Trapped (2008–11, 2013)
- The Tripods (1984–85, in conjunction with the BBC)
- Wicked
- The Wild Adventures of Blinky Bill (2016–18, 2020, 2022 on 7flix)
- Wipe Out (1999–2000)
- Wombat (1983–88)
- The Woodlies (2012–16, 2017 on 7flix)
- Young Seven
- Zeke's Pad (2008–13)
- ZooMoo (2016–24)

==== Preschool ====
- All for Kids (2008–2013)
- Bambaloo (2003–2007, 2011 on 7TWO)
- The Fairies (2005–2012)
- Jay's Jungle (2015–2019)
- Lah-Lah's Adventures (2014–2016)
- Larry the Lawnmower (2008–2011, 2015–2018 on 7TWO)
- Pipsqueaks (2013–2020)
- Playhouse Disney (2003–2008)
- Raggs (2006–2012)
- Toybox (2010–2020)
- The Wiggles series (1998-2000)

==== Music ====
- AMV: All Music Video (2000–2002)
- Eclipse Music TV (2005–2009)
- Saturday Morning Live (1988–1990)
- Video Smash Hits (1990–1994)

==== Soap opera ====
- The Power, The Passion (1989)

==== Sports talk ====
- 100% Tony Squires (2004)
- AFL Game Day (2008–2020)
- The Bounce (2010)
- The Cream (2003)
- The Dream in Athens with Roy and HG (2004)
- The Dream with Roy and HG (2000)
- Four Quarters (1995)
- The Ice Dream with Roy and HG (2002)
- Live and Kicking (1998–1999)
- The Matty Johns Show (2010)
- Road to Rio (2016)
- The Monday Dump (2001–2002)
- Rex Hunt's Footy Panel (1994–2003)
- Santo, Sam and Ed's Sports Fever! (2012)
- Sportsworld (1990–2006)
- Talking Footy (1994–2004; 2013–2020, 2023 on Seven/7mate)
- V8Xtra (2007–2014)
- World of Sport (1959–1987)
- Yum Cha (2008)

==== Sports ====
- Basketball: NBL (1988–1991)
- Horse Racing: Emirates Melbourne Cup Carnival (2002–2018)
- Rugby league: New South Wales Rugby League (1970s–1980s)
- Rugby League: Australian Tests and Tours (1990–1993)
- Rugby League: World Cups (2013 and 2017)
- Rugby union: Super 12 (1996–2003), Wallabies Rugby Internationals (1996–2010), Rugby World Cup (1999, 2003)
- Rugby union: Shute Shield (2015–2020 on 7TWO in NSW only, other states on 7mate, Now on Stan)
- Soccer: NSL (1977–2004)
- Tennis: Australian Open including Hopman Cup, Brisbane International, Sydney International and Kooyong Classic (1973–2018)

==== Annual events ====
- AACTA Awards (2013–2015 on Ten, 2015–2020 on Seven, Now on 10)
- Australia Day Live Concert (now on ABC)
- Darling Harbour Christmas Pageant (now on 10)

=== Foreign ===
==== Soap opera ====
- All My Children
- Berrenger's
- Generations
- Knots Landing
- Passions
- Rituals
- Texas

==== Animation ====
- American Dad! (2005–2010 on Seven, 2010–2022, 2023–2024 on 7mate, 2021–2022 on 7flix, Now on Disney+)
- Clerks: The Animated Series
- Duckman
- The Flintstones' 25th Anniversary Celebration
- Footrot Flats: The Dog's Tale
- Family Guy (1999–2010 on Seven, 2010–2022, 2023–2024 on 7mate, 2021–2022 on 7flix, Now on Disney+)
- Futurama (1999–2004 on Seven, 2019–2022 on 7mate and 7flix, Now on Disney+)
- God, the Devil and Bob
- King of the Hill
- Rock and Rule
- The Simpsons (Season 29–32, 2018–2023 on 7mate and 7flix, Now on Disney+)
- Wait Till Your Father Gets Home

==== Drama ====
- 21 Jump Street (originally aired on Nine Network)
- 24
- 77 Sunset Strip
- The Adventures of Sherlock Holmes
- The Adventures of the Black Stallion
- The Adventures of William Tell
- Against the Wall
- Agent Carter (2016)
- Agents of S.H.I.E.L.D. (7flix)
- Airwolf
- Alias
- All Creatures Great and Small
- Ally McBeal
- Alphas
- Amazing Grace
- American Dreams
- The American Embassy
- American Odyssey
- Angel (later aired on Network Ten and Eleven)
- Aquarius
- Babylon 5
- Bad Girls
- Band of Gold
- Bates Motel
- The Bay
- Beacon Hill
- BeastMaster
- Beggarman, Thief
- Beggars and Choosers
- Bergerac (in conjunction with the BBC)
- The Best Times
- Between the Lines
- Big Shamus, Little Shamus
- Billionaire Boys Club
- Bionic Woman
- Blindspot
- Body of Proof (2011–2013)
- Bodies of Evidence
- Bones
- Boomtown
- Boston Legal
- Boston Public
- Boys from the Bush
- Brotherhood of the Rose
- Brothers & Sisters
- Buffy the Vampire Slayer (later moved to Network Ten and Eleven)
- Cagney and Lacey
- Carbie
- Castle
- The Chase
- Cheat
- Chicago Hope
- CHiPs
- Circus Boy
- City Central
- Cleaning Up
- The Closer
- Cobra
- Code Black (7flix)
- Codename: Kyril
- Commander in Chief
- Coronation Street (later aired on SBS)
- Covert Affairs
- Cover Up
- Criminal Minds
- Criminal Minds: Beyond Borders
- Crossing Jordan
- Cruel Doubt
- The Cult
- Dark Angel
- Dark Justice
- The Darling Buds of May
- David Cassidy: Man Undercover
- Day Break
- Deadly Games
- Dear John
- Death of an Expert Witness
- Dempsey & Makepeace
- Department S
- Desperate Housewives
- Detective in the House
- Detroit 1-8-7
- Diamonds
- Dirty Dancing
- Disraeli
- Double Dare (not to be confused with the Nickelodeon game show of the same name)
- Downton Abbey
- Due South
- The Duke
- Edward the Seventh
- Eerie, Indiana
- The Equalizer
- The Event
- F/X: The Series
- Falcon Crest
- Fame
- Felicity
- Flash Gordon
- FlashForward
- Fly by Night
- Forever Knight
- Fortune Dane
- Freshman Dorm
- GCB
- Generations
- Ghost Whisperer
- Gideon's Crossing
- Gormenghast
- The Greatest American Hero (originally aired on Network Ten and ABC)
- Grey's Anatomy (2005–2018 on Seven, 2018–2021 on 7flix, moved to Disney+)
- Grimm
- Hammer House of Horror
- Hang Time
- The Hardy Boys/Nancy Drew Mysteries
- Hawaiian Eye
- Heartbeat
- Hearts Are Wild
- Heroes
- Heroes Reborn
- Highlander: The Series
- Hill Street Blues
- Homefront
- Homicide: Life on the Street
- Hong Kong
- Huff
- Hung
- Hunter
- In the Heat of the Night
- The Incredible Hulk (1978)
- Inspector Morse
- The Invisible Man (1958)
- Ironside
- Island Son
- I Spy (1965)
- Jack the Ripper
- JAG (later moved to Network Ten and Eleven)
- Jessie
- Jungle Jim
- Just Deal
- Kay O'Brien
- Key West
- Knightwatch
- Lady Blue
- Largo Winch
- Law & Order: Los Angeles
- Leap Years
- Lexx
- Liar
- The Life and Loves of a She-Devil
- Lillie
- Lime Street
- The Lineup
- Lois and Clark: The New Adventures of Superman
- The Lone Gunmen
- Lost
- Lost in Space
- Lucky Chances
- MacGyver
- Maigret
- The Man from U.N.C.L.E.
- Manhunt
- Mancuso, F.B.I.
- Mapp and Lucia
- Martial Law
- McMillan & Wife
- Medical Center
- Midnight Caller
- Misfits of Science
- Missing
- Miss Marple (in conjunction with the BBC)
- Mistresses
- Mitch
- Moody and Pegg
- Motive (7flix)
- Mrs. Biggs
- Murder City
- Mutant X
- Nash Bridges
- The New Untouchables
- Night Heat
- Nightmare Cafe
- The Nightmare Years
- Nowhere Man
- The Oldest Rookie
- One West Waikiki
- Once & Again
- Once Upon a Time (7flix)
- Once Upon a Time in Wonderland (2016)
- The Onedin Line
- Our Family Honor
- Our House
- The Outer Limits
- The Pallisers
- The Passage
- Peak Practice
- Perry Mason
- The Persuaders!
- Peter Gunn
- Phantom Agents
- The Player
- Police Woman
- Popular
- Poltergeist: The Legacy
- The Practice
- Private Practice
- The Professionals
- Profiler
- Providence
- Quantico (7flix)
- Quincy, M.E.
- Reckless
- Red Widow
- Rescue 8 (also airs on Nine Network in Victoria)
- Resurrection
- The Return of Sherlock Holmes
- Return of the Saint
- Revenge (2012–2015)
- Rituals
- The River
- RoboCop: The Series
- Room 222
- The Rousters
- Royal Pains
- Rush Hour
- The Saint
- Shaft
- Shannon's Deal
- Sherlock Holmes
- Sidekicks
- Simon & Simon
- The Six Million Dollar Man
- Snoops
- Space: Above and Beyond
- Space Precinct
- Special Branch
- Spies
- Standoff
- Stargate SG-1
- State of Affairs
- Stephen King's Kingdom Hospital
- Stingray
- The Streets of San Francisco
- Superior Court
- The Sweeney
- Sweet Valley High
- T. and T.
- T.J. Hooker
- Tales from the Crypt
- Tales of the Gold Monkey
- Titanic miniseries
- Thirtysomething
- Threat Matrix
- Thriller
- Time of Your Life
- Time Trax
- A Touch of Frost
- Tour of Duty
- Trapper John, M.D.
- The Troubleshooters
- Tru Calling
- UFO
- Ultimate Force
- Unsolved Mysteries
- Vanished
- Vera (Now on ABC)
- The Village
- The Wackiest Ship in the Army
- When the Boat Comes In
- The White Shadow
- Whiz Kids
- William and Mary
- Windmills of the Gods
- Wings
- Wiseguy
- Within These Walls

==== Comedy ====
- The 100 Lives of Black Jack Savage
- 227
- 30 Rock (Moved to ABC Comedy)
- 3rd Rock from the Sun
- The 5 Mrs. Buchanans
- 8 Simple Rules
- The Abbott and Costello Show
- According to Jim
- Adam's Rib
- After Henry (originally aired on ABC)
- ALF (later moved to Nine)
- Alas Smith and Jones
- 'Allo 'Allo!
- Ally McBeal
- All-New British Bloopers
- Almost Home
- Almost Perfect
- American Dreamer
- Andy Capp
- Are You Being Served? (originally aired on ABC)
- Arli$$
- Arrested Development
- Assaulted Nuts
- Babes in the Wood
- Baby Boom
- Baby Makes Five
- Barney Miller
- Batman
- The Benny Hill Show (originally aired on Network Ten)
- Bent
- Best Friends Forever
- Best of the West
- Better Days
- The Beverly Hillbillies
- Bewitched (originally aired on Nine)
- Birds of a Feather
- The Black Adder (1983, in conjunction with the BBC)
- Blackadder II
- Blackadder the Third
- Blackadder Goes Forth
- Bless This House
- Blossom
- The Bounder
- Boy Meets World
- The Brady Brides
- Brotherly Love
- The Brothers
- Brothers
- Brothers and Sisters
- Café Americain
- California Dreams
- Carol & Company
- Carry On Laughing
- Carter Country
- Car 54, Where Are You?
- Cedric the Entertainer Presents
- Charles in Charge
- Chef!
- City Guys
- Close to Home
- Clueless
- Conrad Bloom
- Cougar Town
- The Crew
- Cutters
- The Dame Edna Experience
- The Danny Thomas Show
- Dave Allen at Large
- Dear John
- The Debbie Reynolds Show
- Dennis the Menace (also airs Nine Network and Network Ten as "Channel 0")
- Dharma & Greg (later aired on Network Ten)
- The Dick Emery Show
- Dinosaurs
- Doctor at Sea
- Doctor in Charge
- Doctor in the House
- Doctor on the Go
- Doc
- The Doris Day Show
- Down and Out in Beverly Hills
- Duty Free
- Eight is Enough
- Ellen
- The Ellen Burstyn Show
- Empty Nest
- Even Stevens
- Ever Decreasing Circles
- Everybody Loves Raymond (later moved to Network Ten and Eleven)
- Family Affair
- A Family for Joe
- The Family Man
- Family Matters
- Family Ties (later moved to Nine)
- The Fanelli Boys
- The Fantastic Miss Piggy Show
- Farrington of the F.O.
- Father, Dear Father
- Father Knows Best
- Fawlty Towers (originally aired on ABC, 7TWO)
- The Fenn Street Gang
- Fish
- Flesh 'n' Blood
- The Flying Nun
- French and Saunders
- Fresh Fields (originally aired on ABC)
- Friends (later moved to Nine)
- Full House (later moved to Nine in the early 1990s)
- Galavant (2016)
- The Gale Storm Show
- Gary Unmarried
- GCB
- The George Carlin Show
- Get Some In!
- Get Smart
- Gidget
- Gimme a Break!
- The Golden Girls
- The Golden Palace
- The Good Life (originally aired on ABC)
- Good Morning, Miss Bliss
- The Goodies (originally aired on ABC)
- Grace Under Fire
- Grandfathered (7flix)
- Grounded For Life
- Guys Next Door
- Hallelujah!
- Hammer, Slammer, & Slade
- Hang Time
- Hangin' with Mr. Cooper
- Happy Endings
- Happy Family
- Hazel
- He's the Mayor
- Here's Lucy (originally aired on Nine Network, later aired on ABC then returned to air on Nine in 1996)
- Herman's Head
- Hi-de-Hi!
- High & Dry
- Hiller and Diller
- His and Hers
- The Hogan Family
- Holding the Fort
- Holmes & Yoyo
- The Home Court
- Home Improvement
- Home James! (originally aired on ABC)
- Home to Roost
- The Honeymooners
- Honey, I Shrunk the Kids: The TV Show
- Hope & Faith
- How I Met Your Mother
- The Hughleys
- Hung
- I Dream of Jeannie (originally aired on Nine)
- I Love Lucy (originally aired on Nine Network, later aired on ABC then returned to air on Nine in 1995)
- In Case of Emergency
- In Loving Memory
- Is It Legal?
- It Ain't Half Hot Mum (originally aired on ABC)
- It Had to Be You
- It's Always Sunny in Philadelphia
- The Jack Benny Program
- James at 15
- Jo Brand Through the Cakehole
- Joe & Valerie
- The John Forsythe Show
- Just Like Family
- Just Our Luck
- Karen
- Kate and Allie
- Keeping Up Appearances (originally aired on ABC)
- The Knights of Prosperity
- The Last Frontier
- Laugh-In (originally aired on Network Ten as Channel 0)
- Laurel and Hardy
- Leave It to Beaver (originally aired on Nine)
- Less than Perfect
- Let There Be Love
- Love and Marriage
- Love Thy Neighbour
- Loves Me, Loves Me Not
- Mack & Myer for Hire
- Malibu, CA
- Mama's Family
- Mann's Best Friends
- The Mary Tyler Moore Show
- Mr. Bean
- Man Up!
- M*A*S*H (originally aired on Network Ten)
- Maybe This Time
- McHale's Navy
- The McLean Stevenson Show
- Me and My Girl
- Mind Your Language
- Minder (originally aired on ABC)
- The Mindy Project
- Misery Loves Company
- Mister Ed (originally aired on ABC)
- Mixed Blessings
- The Mommies
- Mr. Bean (originally aired on ABC from 1991 to 1996, later screened on ABC)
- Mr. Belvedere
- Mrs. Brown's Boys
- Mr. Rhodes
- Mr. Smith
- The Monkees
- Monty Python's Flying Circus (originally aired on ABC, later returned to air on ABC in late 1995)
- The Morecambe & Wise Show
- The Munsters (later aired on Network Ten)
- The Muppets
- The Muppets at Walt Disney World
- Muppets Tonight
- The Muppet Show (later aired on Network Ten)
- My Husband and I
- My Favorite Martian (originally aired on ABC)
- My Name Is Earl
- My Three Sons
- My Wife and Kids
- Nearly Departed
- Never the Twain
- A New Kind of Family
- The New Leave It to Beaver
- The New Statesman
- No, Honestly
- Not Necessarily the News
- Not the Nine O'Clock News
- Nurses
- The Nutt House
- Oh, Doctor Beeching!
- On the Buses
- On the Rocks
- One Day at a Time
- One of the Boys (1989 series)
- Only Fools and Horses
- Open All Hours (originally aired on ABC)
- Our Man Higgins
- Our Miss Brooks
- Outsourced
- Pacific Station
- Parks and Recreation (Later moved to ABC Comedy)
- The Partners
- The Partridge Family (later moved to Nine)
- Perfect Strangers (later moved to Nine)
- Pete and Gladys
- Petticoat Junction
- The Phil Silvers Show (originally aired on ABC)
- The PJs
- Please Sir!
- Police Squad!
- Porridge
- Punky Brewster
- The Pursuit of Happiness
- Reaper
- Reba
- The Redd Foxx Show
- Rising Damp
- The Rob Nelson Show
- Room at the Bottom
- The Ropers
- Roseanne (originally aired on Network Ten)
- Sabrina, the Teenage Witch
- Samantha Who?
- Sara
- Saved by the Bell
- Saved by the Bell: The New Class
- Sergeant Bilko
- Scrubs
- Shadows
- Shelley
- Shut That Door!
- The Sinbad Show
- Singles
- Sister, Sister
- The Slap Maxwell Story
- Smart Guy
- Some Mothers Do 'Ave 'Em (originally aired on ABC)
- Sports Night
- Stacked
- Stark Raving Mad
- Step by Step (later moved to Nine)
- Still Standing
- Still the Beaver
- Struck by Lightning
- Tabitha
- Tammy
- Teachers Only
- Teen Angel
- That Girl
- That '70s Show
- There Comes a Time
- Thick as Thieves
- Three of a Kind
- The Three Stooges (originally aired on Nine)
- The Tom Ewell Show
- The Torkelsons
- The Two Ronnies
- To the Manor Born (originally aired on ABC, also aired on Network Ten)
- Too Close for Comfort
- Ugly Betty
- Unhappily Ever After
- Up the Elephant and Round the Castle
- USA High
- Valerie
- Valerie's Family
- Walter & Emily
- Welcome Back, Kotter
- Whack-O!
- When Things Were Rotten
- Where I Live
- Whitney
- Will & Grace (later aired on Network Ten)
- Woops!
- Working
- Yes, Dear
- The Young Ones (originally aired on ABC, also aired on Network Ten)
- Yus, My Dear
- Zoe, Duncan, Jack and Jane

==== Variety / entertainment ====
- The Dr. Oz Show (7TWO)
- The Grand Tour (Now only on Amazon Prime Video)
- The Martha Stewart Show (7TWO)
- Ricki Lake
- Sha Na Na

==== Game shows ====
- The Generation Game

==== Reality ====
- Age of Love
- Beauty and the Geek (ex-7TWO)
- Breaking the Magician's Code: Magic's Biggest Secrets Finally Revealed (ex-7TWO, ex-7mate)
- Commando: On The Front Line
- I Survived A Japanese Game Show (ex-7TWO)
- Jersey Shore
- Joe Millionaire
- The Legion
- Meet My Folks
- Name Your Adventure
- Playing It Straight
- Power of Attorney
- Ramsay's Kitchen Nightmares
- Seven Year Switch (USA) (2016)
- The Test
- That's Incredible!
- Treasure Hunters
- Unsolved Mysteries

==== Lifestyle ====
- What Not to Wear

==== Observational / documentaries ====
- Airline USA
- Autopsy: The Last Hours Of...
- The Beatles Anthology
- Border Patrol
- Coastwatch
- Donald Duck's 50th Birthday (also on Network Ten in Sydney)
- Fight for Life
- Gordon, Gino and Fred: Road Trip
- Innovation
- Martin Clunes: Islands of America
- Michael Palin's New Europe
- Mickey's 50
- Mickey's 60th Birthday
- Motorway Patrol
- Police Camera Action!
- SCU: Serious Crash Unit
- Unsolved Mysteries (later aired on Network Ten)

==== Western ====
- Alias Smith and Jones
- Casey Jones
- The Cisco Kid
- Colt .45
- Frontier Doctor
- Gunsmoke
- Have Gun – Will Travel
- The Lazarus Man
- Mackenzie's Raiders
- The Oregon Trail
- Outlaws
- Rawhide
- The Restless Gun
- Tales of the Texas Rangers
- Union Pacific
- The Virginian (originally aired on Nine)
- Wanted Dead or Alive
- The Young Riders

==== Anthology ====
- Academy Theatre
- Desilu Playhouse
- Disney's Wonderful World
- Disneyland
- Donald Duck's 50th Birthday
- Freddy's Nightmares
- Insight
- The Magical World of Disney
- Mickey's 50
- Mickey's 60th Birthday
- The Wonderful World of Disney

==== Children's ====
- 101 Dalmatians: The Series
- The 13 Ghosts of Scooby-Doo
- 2 Stupid Dogs
- The 7D (2016–18)
- The Abbott and Costello Cartoon Show (later on Network Ten and ABC)
- Action Man A.T.O.M.
- The Addams Family (1973)
- The Addams Family (1992)
- Adventures from the Book of Virtues
- The Adventures of Black Beauty
- The Adventures of Champion
- The Adventures of Don Coyote and Sancho Panda
- The Adventures of the Galaxy Rangers
- The Adventures of Gulliver (originally on ABC)
- Adventures of the Gummi Bears
- The Adventures of Huckleberry Finn
- The Adventures of Mickey and Donald
- The Adventures of Mole
- The Adventures of Noddy
- The Adventures of Pow Wow (also on Nine Network in Victoria)
- The Adventures of Rin Tin Tin
- The Adventures of Rupert Bear
- The Adventures of Teddy Ruxpin
- The Adventures of Toad
- The Adventures of Twizzle (also on Nine Network in Victoria)
- Afterschool Specials
- Aladdin
- ALF: The Animated Series
- ALF Tales
- Alice in Wonderland or What's a Nice Kid Like You Doing in a Place Like This?
- Aliens First Christmas
- All Dogs Go to Heaven: The Series
- The All-New Popeye Show
- Alpha Teens On Machines
- The Alvin Show (originally on ABC and Network Ten)
- The Amazing Chan and the Chan Clan
- American Dragon: Jake Long (2005–09)
- Animated Adventures of Tom Sawyer (Perth only)
- A.N.T. Farm (2012–17)
- Arabian Nights
- Archie's TV Funnies
- Archie's Weird Mysteries
- Around the World in 80 Days
- Around the World in 80 Dreams
- Asterix in Britain
- Astro Boy (1960)
- The Atom Ant Show (originally aired on ABC)
- Austin & Ally (2013–18)
- Avenger Penguins (2009–11, originally on ABC)
- Bailey's Comets
- The Ballad of Smokey the Bear
- Barney Bear
- Barney Google and Snuffy Smith
- Basil Brush
- Battle B-Daman
- BattleTech: The Animated Series
- Beany and Cecil
- Beast Wars
- Beetle Bailey
- Benji, Zax and the Alien Prince
- Benji's Very Own Christmas Story
- The Berenstain Bears (originally on ABC)
- The Berenstain Bears' Christmas Tree
- Best Friends Whenever (2017–19)
- Betty Boop
- Bill & Ted's Excellent Adventures
- Birdman and the Galaxy Trio
- Blackstar
- Blondie and Dagwood
- Bluetoes the Christmas Elf
- Bob in a Bottle
- Bonkers
- Bon Voyage, Charlie Brown (and Don't Come Back!!)
- The Bots Master
- The Boy from Andromeda
- The Brady Kids
- Brains & Brawn
- Brandy & Mr. Whiskers (2005–09)
- The Brave Frog
- The Brave Frog's Greatest Adventure
- Bubble Town Club (2010–12)
- Buford and the Galloping Ghost
- The Bugaloos
- The Bugs Bunny/Road Runner Hour
- The Bugs Bunny Show (usually airs on Nine Network)
- Bugs Bunny Superstar
- Bumpety Boo
- Butch Cassidy and the Sundance Kids (originally aired on ABC)
- Buzz Lightyear of Star Command
- The Buzz on Maggie (2006–09)
- Cabbage Patch Kids: First Christmas
- Calvin and the Colonel
- Camp Candy
- Captain Caveman and the Teen Angels
- Captain N: The Game Master
- Captain Scarlet and the Mysterons
- Cars Toons (2010)
- Cartoon All-Stars to the Rescue
- Casper and the Angels (originally aired on ABC)
- Casper's First Christmas
- CB Bears
- Centurions
- Challenge of the GoBots
- A Child's Christmas in Wales
- Child's Play
- Chip 'n Dale Rescue Rangers
- Christmas Comes to Pac-Land
- Christopher the Christmas Tree
- Chucklewood Critters
- A Chucklewood Easter
- Clue Club (originally on Nine Network)
- Clutch Cargo
- Combo Niños (2009–12)
- A Connecticut Yankee in King Arthur's Court
- Cool McCool (also on Nine Network and Network Ten as Channel 0)
- Cosmic Cowboys
- Count Duckula (2009–11, originally on ABC and Network Ten)
- The Count of Monte Cristo
- Courageous Cat and Minute Mouse
- Cow and Chicken
- Crash & Bernstein (2015–18)
- The Cricket on the Hearth
- Crusader Rabbit
- Da Möb
- Danger Mouse (2009–11, originally on ABC)
- Darkwing Duck
- Dastardly and Muttley in Their Flying Machines (originally on Nine Network and Network Ten as Channel 0)
- Dave the Barbarian
- Defenders of the Earth
- Dennis the Menace in Mayday for Mother
- Deputy Dawg
- The Devil and Daniel Mouse
- Devlin
- Dexter's Laboratory (later on Nine Network)
- The Dick Tracy Show
- Digimon Data Squad (2009–11)
- Dog with a Blog (2014–19)
- Donkey Kong
- Dot and Spot's Magical Christmas
- Doug
- Drak Pack
- Droopy
- Droopy, Master Detective
- DuckTales (1987)
- Dumb and Dumber
- Dungeons & Dragons (later on Network Ten)
- Dynomutt, Dog Wonder
- The Easter Bunny Is Comin' to Town
- Easter Egg Mornin'
- Ed, Edd n Eddy (later on Nine Network)
- Elephant Boy
- The Elf Who Saved Christmas
- Emmet Otter's Jug-Band Christmas
- The Emperor's New School (2006–10)
- The Evermoor Chronicles (2017–19)
- Fairy Tale Favorites
- A Family Circus Christmas
- Family Dog
- The Famous Adventures of Mr. Magoo
- Famous Classic Tales
- The Fantastic Four
- Fantastic Max (originally on ABC)
- Fantastic Voyage
- Fat Albert and the Cosby Kids
- Father Christmas and the Missing Reindeer
- Felix the Cat (originally on ABC Kids, sometimes shared with Network Ten in Victoria)
- Festival of Family Classics
- Fillmore!
- Fireball XL5
- The First Easter Rabbit
- The First Christmas
- The First Christmas: The Story of the First Christmas Snow
- The First Snow of Winter (originally on ABC Kids)
- Fish Hooks (2012–17)
- Fix & Foxi and Friends
- The Flight of Dragons
- A Flintstone Christmas
- A Flintstones Christmas Carol
- A Flintstone Family Christmas
- The Flintstone Comedy Show
- Flintstone Frolics
- The Flintstone Kids
- The Flintstones (also on Nine Network, sometimes shared with Network Ten as Channel 0, later on 9Go!)
- The Flintstones Meet Rockula and Frankenstone
- The Flintstones: Little Big League
- The Flintstones' 25th Anniversary Celebration
- Flipper (2009–11)
- Fluppy Dogs
- Foofur
- Frankenstein Jr. and The Impossibles
- Frosty the Snowman
- Frosty's Winter Wonderland
- The Funky Phantom (originally on Nine Network)
- Galaxy Goof-Ups (originally on Nine Network)
- Galtar and the Golden Lance
- Gamer's Guide to Pretty Much Everything (2016–19)
- Gargoyles
- Gargoyles: The Goliath Chronicles
- George and Junior's Christmas Spectacular
- Get Ed (2006–09)
- Girl Meets World (2017–19)
- Godzilla
- Good Luck Charlie (2011–17)
- Goof Troop
- Gravedale High
- Gravity Falls (2013–19)
- The Great Grape Ape Show
- The Great Santa Claus Caper
- The Greatest Adventure: Stories from the Bible
- Groovy Goolies (shared with Nine Network and Network Ten)
- Gumby (also on Nine Network, later on ABC)
- Hagar the Horrible
- Hanna-Barbera Superstars 10
- Hannah Montana (2007–12)
- Happy Birthday Bunnykins
- Harry's Mad (2010)
- Harvey Girls Forever! (2019) (Seasons 1 and 2 only)
- He-Man and the Masters of the Universe
- Heathcliff
- Heckle and Jeckle
- Hello Kitty's Furry Tale Theater
- Hercules: The Animated Series
- The Herculoids (originally on Nine Network)
- Here Comes the Grump
- Here Comes Peter Cottontail
- Hey There, It's Yogi Bear!
- Heyyy, It's the King!
- Hollyrock-a-Bye Baby
- A Hollywood Hounds Christmas
- Hong Kong Phooey (originally on Nine Network)
- Hot Dog
- House of Mouse
- Huckleberry Finn and His Friends
- Huckleberry Hound (sometimes on Nine Network in Sydney)
- Hugo the Hippo
- Hunter's Gold
- I Am Weasel
- I Didn't Do It (2015–19)
- I'm in the Band (2012–14)
- I'm Telling!
- Inch High, Private Eye (originally on Nine Network)
- The Incredible Hulk
- Inhumanoids
- It's Punky Brewster!
- I Yabba-Dabba Do!
- Iznogoud
- Jabberjaw (originally on Nine Network)
- James Bond Jr.
- Jeannie
- Jessie (2013–19)
- The Jetsons
- Jim Henson's Animal Show
- Jin Jin and the Panda Patrol
- Jingle Bell Rap
- Jingle Bell Rock
- Johnny Bravo (later on Nine Network)
- Jolly Old St. Nicholas
- JONAS (2009–12)
- Jonas Brothers: Living the Dream (2010)
- Jonny Quest (originally on Network Ten as Channel 0)
- Josie and the Pussycats (originally on Nine Network, later on 9Go!)
- Josie and the Pussycats in Outer Space (originally on Nine Network, later on 9Go!)
- Journey to the Center of the Earth
- Journey to the Heart of the World
- Jungle Cubs
- Jurassic Cubs
- Just William
- K.C. Undercover (2016–18)
- Ken the Wolf Boy
- Kick Buttowski: Suburban Daredevil (2012–15)
- Kickin' It (2014–18)
- The Kids from C.A.P.E.R.
- Kids Incorporated
- Kim Possible (2003–10)
- King Leonardo and His Short Subjects (originally on ABC, also on Nine Network and Network Ten as Channel 0)
- Kirby Buckets (2016–19)
- Kissyfur
- Korg: 70,000 B.C.
- The Kwicky Koala Show
- Lab Rats (2015–19)
- Lamb Chop's Play-Along
- Land of the Lost
- Lassie (also on ABC and Network Ten)
- The Last Halloween
- The Last of the Mohicans
- A Laurel and Hardy Cartoon (originally on ABC and Network Ten)
- The Legend of Prince Valiant
- The Legend of Tarzan
- The Legends of Treasure Island (2010, originally on ABC)
- The Leprechauns' Christmas Gold
- Life with Louie
- Lilo & Stitch: The Series
- Linus the Lionhearted
- The Lionhearts
- The Little Crooked Christmas Tree
- Little Golden Book Land
- The Little Mermaid
- Little Orphan Annie's A Very Animated Christmas
- The Little Rascals
- The Little Train
- The Little Troll Prince
- Liv and Maddie (2014–19)
- Lloyd In Space
- The Lone Ranger
- Looney Tunes (usually airs on Nine Network)
- Mad Scientist
- Magic Boy's Easter
- The Magical Adventures of Quasimodo
- Magilla Gorilla (originally on Nine Network and sometimes Network Ten as Channel 0)
- The Man Called Flintstone
- Marsupilami
- The Marvel Super Heroes
- Marvin: Baby of the Year
- The Mask: Animated Series
- Masked Rider
- Maxie's World
- Maya the Bee
- Merrie Melodies (also on Nine Network)
- A Merry Mirthworm Christmas
- Miami 7
- Micah's Christmas Treasure
- Michael Bentine's Potty Time (later on ABC)
- Midnight Patrol: Adventures in the Dream Zone
- Mickey Mouse and Friends
- The Mickey Mouse Club (sometimes on Nine Network in Sydney)
- Mickey Mouse Works
- Mighty Ducks
- Mighty Max
- Mighty Med (2015–18)
- Mighty Morphin Alien Rangers
- Mighty Morphin Power Rangers
- Mighty Mouse
- The Mighty Orbots
- Moby Dick and Mighty Mightor (originally on Nine Network)
- Mole's Christmas
- Monster in My Pocket
- Monster Squad
- The Mouse Factory
- Mr. Magoo
- Mr. Willowby's Christmas Tree
- The Mumbly Cartoon Show
- Mummies Alive!
- Mummy Nanny
- The Muppet Musicians of Bremen (originally on ABC)
- My Favorite Fairy Tales
- My Pet Monster
- Nestor the Long-Eared Christmas Donkey
- The New 3 Stooges (also on Network Ten)
- The New Adventures of Black Beauty
- The New Adventures of Flash Gordon
- The New Adventures of Madeline (originally on ABC, later returned to ABC)
- The New Adventures of Winnie the Pooh
- The New Fred and Barney Show
- The New Mickey Mouse Club
- The New Pink Panther Show
- The New Scooby and Scrappy-Doo Show
- The New Scooby-Doo Movies (originally on Nine)
- The New Scooby-Doo Mysteries
- The New Shmoo
- The New Yogi Bear Show
- Nick and Noel
- Nick & Perry
- Nightmare Ned
- Noddy's Toyland Adventures
- Norman Normal
- The Nutcracker Prince
- Ōban Star-Racers (2007–09)
- The Osmonds
- Out of Control
- Pac-Man
- Paddle Pop: Atlantos (2016)
- Pair of Kings (2012–17)
- Pancho and Rancho
- Partridge Family 2200 A.D.
- Paw Paws
- The Pebbles and Bamm-Bamm Show
- Penn Zero: Part-Time Hero (2016–19)
- Pepper Ann
- The Perils of Penelope Pitstop (originally on Nine Network)
- Phantom 2040
- Phantom Agents
- Phineas and Ferb (2008–17)
- Pickle and Peanut (2017–19)
- Pingu (aired as a segment on The Book Place, now on ABC Kids)
- The Pink Panther
- The Pink Panther in: A Pink Christmas
- The Pink Panther in: Olym-Pinks
- The Pink Panther in: Pink at First Sight
- Pinocchio's Christmas
- The Pirates of Dark Water
- The Plastic Man Comedy/Adventure Show
- Poochini
- Popeye and Son
- Popeye the Sailor
- The Porky Pig Show (usually on Nine Network, sometimes shared with Network Ten)
- Postman Pat
- Pound Puppies (1986, sometimes on Network Ten in Victoria)
- Power Rangers Dino Thunder
- Power Rangers in Space
- Power Rangers Jungle Fury (2010–11)
- Power Rangers Lightspeed Rescue
- Power Rangers Lost Galaxy
- Power Rangers Mystic Force (2007–10)
- Power Rangers Ninja Storm
- Power Rangers Operation Overdrive (2008–11)
- Power Rangers RPM (2010–11)
- Power Rangers SPD
- Power Rangers Time Force
- Power Rangers Turbo
- Power Rangers Wild Force
- Power Rangers Zeo
- The Powerpuff Girls (1998) (later on Nine Network)
- PrankStars (2013–15)
- Press Gang (2010, originally on ABC Kids)
- Princess Knight
- The Proud Family (2004–08)
- Pucca (2007–09)
- A Pup Named Scooby-Doo
- The Puzzle Club Easter Adventure
- Quack Pack
- Quick Draw McGraw (sometimes on Nine Network)
- Race for Your Life, Charlie Brown
- The Raccoons
- Raggedy Ann and Andy: A Musical Adventure
- Raggedy Ann and Andy in The Great Santa Claus Caper
- Raggedy Ann and Andy in The Pumpkin Who Couldn't Smile
- Rainbow (also on Nine Network and Network Ten)
- Rainbow Brite
- Randy Cunningham: 9th Grade Ninja (2015–18)
- Ratz
- Raw Toonage
- The Real Adventures of Jonny Quest
- ReBoot
- Recess
- The Replacements (2007–11)
- Return to the Planet of the Apes
- Richie Rich
- Ring Raiders
- The Road Runner Show (usually on Nine Network)
- Robotech (originally on Network Ten)
- Rocket Robin Hood
- Rocky and His Friends
- Roger Ramjet (later on ABC)
- The Roman Holidays (originally on ABC)
- Romie-0 and Julie-8
- Rudolph and Frosty's Christmas in July
- The Ruff and Reddy Show
- S Club 7 in Miami
- Sabrina: The Animated Series
- Sailor Moon (DIC dub, later on Network Ten)
- Salty
- Samurai Pizza Cats
- Science Court
- Scooby and Scrappy-Doo (originally on Nine Network)
- The Scooby-Doo Show (originally on Nine Network)
- Scooby-Doo, Where Are You! (originally on Nine Network)
- Scooby's All-Star Laff-A-Lympics (originally on Nine Network)
- Sealab 2020 (originally on ABC)
- Second Star to the Left
- The Secret Service
- Secret Squirrel (originally on ABC)
- Shake it Up (2012–16)
- Shazzan (originally on Nine Network)
- She-Ra: Princess of Power
- Sherlock Holmes in the 22nd Century
- Shirley Temple's Storybook
- Shirt Tales
- The Shnookums and Meat Funny Cartoon Show
- Silent Night, Holy Night
- Silver Hawks
- The Skatebirds (originally on Nine Network)
- Sky Commanders
- The Smurfs
- Snagglepuss (also on Nine Network)
- Snorks (also on Nine Network in Adelaide)
- Sonic the Hedgehog
- Sonic Underground
- Sonic X (Jetix version)
- Sonny with a Chance (2010–13)
- So Random! (2012–15)
- SpaceCats
- The Space Explorers
- Space Ghost (originally on Nine Network, sometimes on Network Ten as Channel 0)
- The Space Kidettes (originally on Nine Network)
- Space Knights
- Space Stars
- Space Strikers
- A Special Sesame Street Christmas (only Sesame Street special on Seven, all other specials on ABC)
- Speed Buggy (originally on ABC)
- Speed Racer (originally on ABC and Network Ten, later on ABC)
- Spunky and Tadpole
- Squigglevision
- The Stableboy's Christmas
- Star Trek: The Animated Series (originally on Nine Network, later on ELEVEN)
- Star vs. the Forces of Evil (2017–19)
- Star Wars Rebels (2014–18)
- The Stingiest Man in Town
- Stitch! (2011–13)
- The Story of the Little Tree
- The Super 6
- The Super Globetrotters
- Super Robot Monkey Team Hyperforce Go! (2005–09)
- SWAT Kats: The Radical Squadron
- Tales of Washington Irving
- TaleSpin
- Tarzan and the Super 7
- Teacher's Pet
- Teamo Supremo (2003–08)
- Teenage Mutant Ninja Turtles (1987, later on ELEVEN)
- Terrahawks
- That's So Raven
- These Are the Days
- The Thing
- Thomas & Friends
- Thundarr the Barbarian (originally on Network Ten)
- Thunderbirds 2086
- Thundercats (1986)
- Timeless Tales from Hallmark
- Timon & Pumbaa
- The Tiny Tree
- Tom and Jerry
- Tom and Jerry's 50th Birthday Bash
- Tom and Jerry Kids
- The Tom and Jerry Show (1975)
- Tom Terrific
- The Tomfoolery Show
- The Tomorrow People
- Top Cat (originally on Nine Network, later on 9Go!)
- Touché Turtle and Dum Dum (originally on Nine Network)
- The Town That Santa Forgot
- Toxic Crusaders
- Tractor Tom (later moved to ABC Kids)
- Transformers
- The Transformers: The Movie
- Travels of Marco Polo
- Trollkins
- The Trolls and the Christmas Express
- Tukiki and His Search for a Merry Christmas
- The Twelve Gifts
- Ultimate Spider-Man (2013–15)
- Uncle Croc's Block (shares with Nine Network)
- Underdog
- The Velveteen Rabbit
- Victor and Hugo: Bunglers in Crime (2009–10, originally on ABC)
- Video Power
- Voltron: The Third Dimension
- Wacky Races (originally aired on Nine Network)
- The Wacky World of Tex Avery
- Wander Over Yonder (2015–19)
- The Weekenders
- Weird-Oh's
- What About Mimi?
- The What-A-Cartoon! Show
- Which Witch is Which?
- Why the Bears Dance on Christmas Eve
- The Wind in the Willows (1984 TV series) (2009–11, originally on ABC)
- The Wind in the Willows (1987 film)
- Win, Lose or Draw (2015, 2017)
- W.I.T.C.H. (2005–09)
- Wizards of Waverly Place (2008–14)
- Woody Woodpecker
- Woof! (2010, originally on Nine Network and ABC)
- The World of Tosh
- The Wuzzles
- The Year Without a Santa Claus
- The Yearling
- Yin Yang Yo! (2008–12)
- Yo Yogi!
- Yogi Bear
- Yogi Bear's All Star Comedy Christmas Caper
- Yogi the Easter Bear
- Yogi's Ark Lark
- Yogi's First Christmas
- Yogi's Gang (shared with Network Ten)
- Yogi's Space Race
- Yogi's Treasure Hunt
- Young Robin Hood
- Young Samson and Goliath
- Yvon of the Yukon
- Zeke and Luther (2012–16)
- Zoo Life with Jack Hanna
- Zoopops

==== Preschool ====
- Art Attack (2013–18)
- The Book of Pooh
- Doc McStuffins (2013–19)
- Handy Manny (2009–16)
- Henry Hugglemonster (2014–19)
- Jake and the Never Land Pirates (2012–19)
- The Lion Guard (2016–19)
- Mickey Mouse Clubhouse (2007–18)
- Miles From Tomorrowland (2015–18)
- My Friends Tigger & Pooh (2008–10)
- PB&J Otter
- Sheriff Callie's Wild West (2015–17)
- Sofia the First (2013–19)
- Stanley (2004–08)

==== Sports ====
- Commonwealth Games: Manchester 2002, Gold Coast 2018
- Rugby league: Rugby league World Cup (2013, 2017)
- Tennis: French Open (2002), Wimbledon (2011–2020 on Seven & 7TWO)
- Winter Olympic Games: PyeongChang 2018

==== Annual events ====
- Grammy Awards (2018–2019, 2022)

== See also ==
- List of programs broadcast by ABC (Australian TV network)
- List of programs broadcast by Network 10
- List of programs broadcast by Nine Network
- List of programs broadcast by Special Broadcasting Service
- List of Australian television series
