= Weekender =

Weekender may refer to:

- "Weekender", Australian term for weekend house, an accommodation used for holiday vacations

== Boats ==
- Pearson 26 Weekender, an American sailboat design for weekend cruising.
- Typhoon 18 Weekender, an American sailboat design for weekend cruising.
- Weekender 24, an American sailboat design for weekend cruising.

== Film and television ==
- Weekender (TV series), a lifestyle TV program on the Seven Network in Queensland, Australia; also Sydney Weekender, Melbourne Weekender, WA Weekender, SA Weekender
- Weekender (film), a 2011 British drama
- The Weekenders, an American animated television series
- The Weekenders (TV pilot), a one-off British television pilot

== Music ==
- Weekender (album), released in 2002 by German duo Aquagen
- "Weekender" (Flowered Up song), a 1992 single
- "Weekender / Asu e no Yell", a 2014 single
- Weekender Records, an English independent record label, 2006–2010

== Publishing ==
- Weekender (Devon newspaper), a free newspaper in Devon, United Kingdom
- Weekender (Northeastern Pennsylvania weekly), an arts and entertainment weekly for Wilkes-Barre

== Sports ==
- Weekender, nickname given to the California–USC football rivalry.
