= Guide to the Good Life =

- The program's logo
- Presented by: Andrew Gaze; Mark Skaife; Steve Snow; Gorgi Quill; Max Walker; Colette Mann; Sofie Formica
- Country of origin: Australia
- No. of seasons: 1

Production
- Running time: Approx 30 minutes (including commercials)

Original release
- Network: Channel Seven
- Release: 6 June 2009 – present

Guide to the Good Life is a weekly Australian television series that airs on Channel Seven.

The series, sponsored by insurance company APIA, features various lifestyle segments including food, travel, motoring, home and finance advice. The program is aimed towards older viewers, the same demographic targeted by APIA.

The program premiered at 5pm on Saturday, 6 June 2009. It joins similar Seven programs such as Mercurio's Menu, Coxy's Big Break and Sydney Weekender, which are also shown on weekend afternoons between 5pm and 6pm.

The program is made in 1080i 25PsF high-definition.

== Presenters ==
The presenters of Guide to the Good Life include:

- Andrew Gaze, former Olympic basketball player and current commentator for Seven Sport
- Mark Skaife, former V8 Supercar driver and current commentator for Seven Sport
- Steve Snow, chef
- Gorgi Quill, former news reporter and singer
- Max Walker, former test cricketer and writer
- Colette Mann, entertainer
- Sofie Formica, host of The Great South East
