= Coxy =

Coxy may refer to:

- Andrew "Coxy" Cox, a member of The Fauves, an Australian rock band
- Geoff Cox (born 1951), Australian musician and media personality
- Paul Cox (footballer) (born 1972), English football manager and former player
- Sara Cox (born 1974), English broadcaster who played "Nurse Coxy" on the British radio show Sunday Surgery
