= Coxy's Big Break =

- Created by: WTFN
- Presented by: Geoff Cox
- Country of origin: Australia
- Original language: English
- No. of seasons: 9
- No. of episodes: 348

Production
- Running time: 30 minutes per episode (inc. commercials)
- Production company: WTFN

Original release
- Network: Seven Network
- Release: 17 April 2004 – 22 March 2015

Coxy's Big Break was a daily travel show which premiered in 2004. It aired across Victoria at 5:30 pm on Seven Melbourne and Prime. It had previously been screened nationally on Seven's HD channel, and was sold overseas.

== History ==
Hosted by Geoff "Coxy" Cox, the show visited locations across Australia and around the world. The local edition of the program kept Victoria as its primary focus. Other destinations included New Zealand, Hong Kong, Japan, Bali, Vanuatu, the Cook Islands, New Caledonia, China, Hawaii, Austria, Ireland, Thailand and Antarctica.

The Seven Network aired different travel shows in the weekend 5:30pm timeslot, including Queensland Weekender and The Great South East in Brisbane, Sydney Weekender in Sydney, and Discover in Adelaide.

The program was produced in PAL 1080i 25PsF high-definition after the start of 2007.

In March 2015, Cox announced on the show's website that the program would end after 11 years.

=== Reporters ===
- Melissa Hetherington
- Melanie-Jade Netherclift
- James Sherry
- Rhys Uhlich
- Des Dowling
- James Freemantle
- Angie Hilton
- Kelly Landry
- Nick Stratford
- Nicky Whelan
- Scherri-Lee Biggs
