= Dan Paris =

Australian actor and photographer (born 1973)

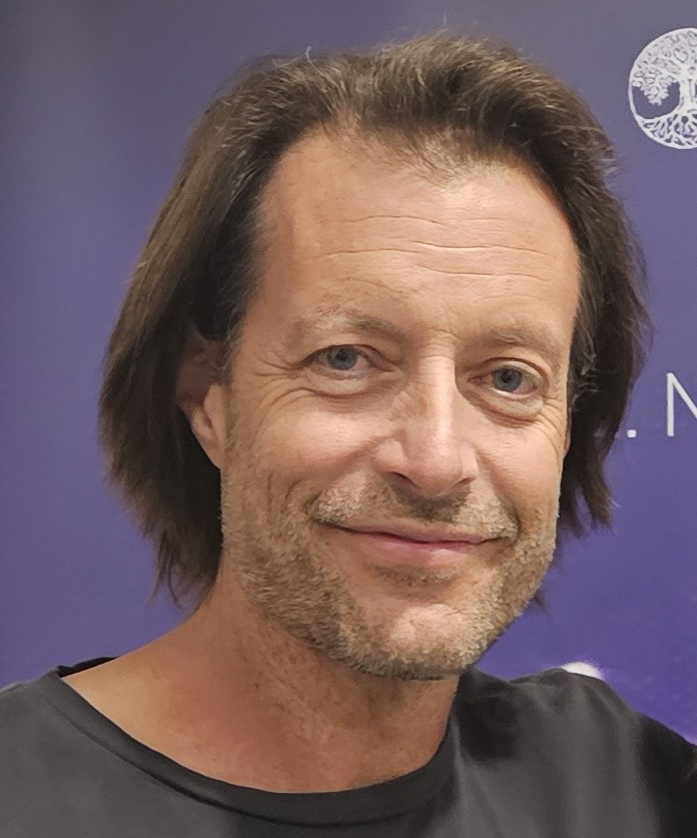
- Born: Daniel Paris; 15 June 1973 (age 53); Perth, Australia
- Occupations: Actor, photographer
- Years active: 1980–present
- Website: http://www.danparis.com.au

Daniel Paris (born 15 June 1973) is an Australian actor and photographer. He is best known for playing the role of Drew Kirk in the Australian soap opera Neighbours.

== Early life ==
Paris was born in Perth, Western Australia. In 1980, when he was 7, his family moved from the Perth suburb of Greenwood, to the coastal town of Esperance.

Over the years, Paris competed in various triathlons. From 1990 to 1994, he was a surf lifesaver and won the under-21 state medal in surfboat competition. In 1991 he competed with the WA swim team, and in 1998 Paris was Sports Person of the Year (swimming) in State Country Region WA.

Paris also modelled in commercials, catwalks and stills.

In 1993, Paris received his degree in accounting from Edith Cowan University in Western Australia and briefly worked for a major Australian finance company.

== Career ==
=== Actor and presenter ===
Paris never aspired to be an actor. After travelling around Australia, he settled in Melbourne and while working in a bar, he attended a general audition at Grundy's without any acting experience. He secured his first role in 1998 as Drew Kirk in the soap opera Neighbours. Drew was known for his long-running romance story arc with Libby Kennedy (Kym Valentine). In 2002, Paris decided to leave the serial to pursue new challenges and travel around Australia with his partner. He asked for his character to be killed off and Drew dies after a horse-riding accident.

After leaving Neighbours, Paris took up photography and went travelling. In late 2004, he began thinking about acting again and contacted his agent, who secured him a guest role in McLeod's Daughters in 2005. Kirk described his character as "a bit of a bad egg", and said that he enjoyed playing someone very different from Drew. He also had a guest role in MDA. Paris returned to Neighbours in December 2005 for a guest stint as a ghostly vision of Drew in Steph Scully's (Carla Bonner) dreams.

Paris became an advertising host for Aqua Technics and Ashley Martin. He then became a regular presenter on the travel program Postcards WA in 2007 and 2009. This was followed by presenting roles on DestinationWA, ZoomTV, Home in WA, The West Real Estate Program, and WA Weekender in 2014. He has also hosted various natural history documentaries.

Paris reprised his role as Drew Kirk for the web spin-off Neighbours vs Zombies in 2014. He played Mark Davies in the ABC/Matchbox television series The Heights from 2019 to 2020.

=== Photographer & videographer ===
Paris is also a freelance landscape photographer and cinematographer, operating both Dan Paris Photography and Bauhaus Films video production.

He has produced several photography books: "Images of a Southern Coastline" (2006), "Images of a Northern Peninsula" (2007), "Leaving Footprints in Esperance" (2009) and "Esperance - A Place Less Travelled" (2014).

When work dried up at the beginning of the COVID-19 pandemic, he turned to market gardening, using a concept known as community-supported agriculture (CSA). He operates off two hectares of land in Esperance, named 'Mystwood Harvest'.

== Personal life ==
Paris and his horticulturalist partner, Tanya Jenkin have two children and live in Esperance, Western Australia.

== Filmography ==
=== Film ===
Year	Title	Role	Type
2020	I Met a Girl	TV host	Feature film
2022	How to Please a Woman	Mike	Feature film

=== Television ===
Year	Title	Role	Type
1998-2002	Neighbours	Drew Kirk	TV series, 353 episodes
1999	Live and Kicking	Self	TV series, 1 episode
2003	MDA	Nathan	TV series, 1 episode
2005	McLeod's Daughters	Renegade	TV series, 1 episode
2005	Neighbours	Drew Kirk’s ghost	TV series
2007; 2009	Postcards WA	Presenter	TV series
2011–12	The West Real Estate Program	Presenter	TV series
2012	ZoomTV	Presenter	TV series
2014	DestinationWA	Presenter	TV series, episode 2: "Albany", episode 9: "Galati Brothers"
2014	Home in WA	Presenter	TV series
2014	WA Weekender	Presenter	TV series, 1 episode
2014	Neighbours vs Zombies	Drew Kirk	TV miniseries, 2 episodes
2019–20	The Heights	Mark Davies	TV series, 60 episodes
2021	Isolation Interviews	Self	TV series
2022	Studio 10	Self	TV series
2022	Mystery Road: Origin	Psychologist	TV series, 2 episodes

== Theatre ==
Year	Title	Role	Type
2001–05	Jack and the Beanstalk	Jack Trott	Hawth Theatre, Grand Opera House, Belfast
2002–03	Snow White & the Seven Dwarfs	The Prince	Grand Theatre, Wolverhampton
2003–04	Cinderella	The Prince	Swansea Grand Theatre
