= The Music Jungle =

- Presented by: Asha Kuerten (2007); Angela Johnson (2008); Lizzy Lovette (2008–2009)
- Country of origin: Australia
- Original language: English
- No. of seasons: 3

Production
- Running time: 60 minutes (Including commercials)

Original release
- Network: Nine Network
- Release: 31 March 2007 – March 2009

The Music Jungle was an Australian music television show that was broadcast on the Nine Network on Saturday mornings between 11am and 12pm.

The 2007 season began on 31 March and ended on 8 December. The 2008 season began on 22 March. The Music Jungle last aired in March 2009.

== Program format ==
The Music Jungle generally played Top 40 Australian and overseas music clips.

The show was produced by Headlock Media, the Television and Content Creation Division of Sony Music Australia.

== Presenters ==
The initial host was Asha Kuerten in 2007. In 2008, Angela Johnson of The Mint replaced Asha Kuerten as host. On 14 June 2008, former host of Eclipse Music TV and Famous Uncensored Lizzy Lovette replaced Angela Johnson.

== See also ==
- List of Australian music television shows
