= The Cartoon Company =

- Genre: children's block
- Presented by: Bob Driessen; Karen Dunkerton; Craig Campbell; Michelle Marr; Kathy Hopper; Robyn Gorrell; Tony Johnston; Kristine Davis; Nerida Leishman
- Country of origin: Australia
- Original language: English
- No. of seasons: 6

Production
- Running time: 5 hours

Original release
- Network: Nine Network
- Release: 19 July 1986 – 23 November 1991

The Cartoon Company was an Australian children's television morning cartoon, airing every Saturday on the Nine Network.

It first broadcast on 19 July 1986 and was hosted by Young Talent Time star's Bob Driessen and Karen Dunkerton, as well as Craig Campbell, Kathy Hopper (who had also presented the early Melbourne edition of The Bugs Bunny Show in the 1980s) and Michelle Marr from 1986 to 1989 and later Robyn Gorrell (only from 1989), Tony Johnston (from 1989 to 1991), Kristine Davis (only from 1990) and Nerida Leishman (only from 1991).

== Synopsis ==
The series featured jokes, competitions, guest stars and cartoons

== List of Cartoons ==
Rocky and Bullwinkle
Hero High
Dinosaucers
Scooby-Doo
Garfield
The Mork & Mindy / Laverne & Shirley / Fonz Hour
Grimm's Fairy Tale Classics
The New Archies
The Kwicky Koala Show
The Karate Kid
Mighty Mouse: The New Adventures
Magilla Gorilla
The Adventures of the Little Koala
Valley of the Dinosaurs
The New Adventures of Zorro
Yogi's Space Race
Help! It's The Hair Bear Bunch
Pandamonium
Heathcliff
Josie and the Pussycats in Outer Space
The Real Ghostbusters
Richie Rich
The New Archie and Sabrina Hour
C.O.P.S.
Teen Wolf
Superman
Sherlock Hound
BraveStarr
Slimer! And the Real Ghostbusters
The Littles
Heathcliff and Marmaduke
The Lone Ranger
The Super Mario Bros. Super Show!
The Care Bears Movie

== Spin off series ==
The series also had a spin-off series for younger children called The C Company presented by Tony Johnston, Kristine Davis and Nerida Leishman who were The Cartoon Company's final three hosts.

It was first broadcast on 3 March 1990 and featured several cartoons such as Denver, the Last Dinosaur, the first three Dot movies and The Charlie Brown and Snoopy Show

Whilst live action shows including Woof!, Professor Poopsnagle's Steam Zeppelin, The Curiosity Show, KTV, Hills End, C'mon Kids, Pugwall, The Girl from Tomorrow, Bush Beat, Goodsports and Elly & Jools plus live-action movies and specials including works from the Children's Film Foundation.

Both of these shows were axed on 23 November 1991.
