= Quizmaster =

Quizmaster can refer to:

- Game show host, a quizmaster on a broadcast program
- Quizmaster, an alternate universe superhero version of the DC Comics supervillain The Riddler

== Television ==
- Quiz Master, a 2002 Australian game show produced by the Seven Network
- Quizmaster, the 2006 series on Nine Network's Temptation
- "Quizz Master", Inspector Gadget (1983) season 1, episode 64 (1983)
- "The Quiz Masters", Fantasy Island season 5, episode 20b(1982)
