= Tony Johnston =

Australian television presenter, producer and radio broadcaster

- Born: 9 April 1970 (age 56); Brisbane, Queensland, Australia
- Occupations: Television presenter, actor
- Years active: 1986-present

Tony Johnston (born 9 April 1970) is an Australian television presenter, producer and radio broadcaster. Tony began his career in 1986, as a presenter on the music video show Saturday Jukebox on the Seven Network in Australia.

In 1987, he started hosting the children's program OK with the Nine Network. In 1992, Tony became a reporter with the Logie Award winning program Wonder World. Johnston also hosted Nine's children's game show My Generation. In 1996, he was named host of the children's game show, Time Masters on the Seven Network. In the same year, he became a presenter The Great Outdoors. In 1999, he became host of another children's game show Wipeout.

Between 2002 and 2003, Johnston was the weather presenter on Seven News Brisbane. He also worked as a reporter for The Great South East in Queensland and hosted a talkback radio show on Brisbane radio station 4BC. From 2003, he was a director of a new media production company Tjtv Pty Ltd, and continued his radio career with the Australian Broadcasting Corporation, as a presenter with ABC Radio Brisbane and Coast FM. In 2008, he joined World Radio Switzerland, Switzerland's English speaking radio station.
