= What Really Happens on the Gold Coast =

- Title card for What Really Happens on the Gold Coast.
- Genre: Reality
- Country of origin: Australia
- Original language: English
- No. of seasons: 1
- No. of episodes: 1

Production
- Production location: Gold Coast, Queensland
- Camera setup: Multiple
- Running time: 42 minutes
- Production company: McAvoy Media

Original release
- Network: Seven Network
- Release: 3 February 2016

What Really Happens on the Gold Coast is an Australian reality documentary television series that airs on the Seven Network.

The series is the second spin-off of the 2014 program What Really Happens in Bali, following the 2015 series What Really Happens in Thailand, and is produced by the same production company McAvoy Media. The series will film Australian locals, workers and tourists in various locations on the Gold Coast, including nightclubs, hospitals and cosmetic surgery centres. It was filmed between November 2014 and January 2015, and will include scenes from Schoolies celebrations from 2014.

== Broadcast ==
The series debuted in Australia on the Seven Network on 3 February 2016.

== Episodes ==
No.	Title	Original release date	Aus. viewers
1	"Episode 1"	3 February 2016	N/A
Take a behind the scenes look at the famous glitter strip to meet Aussies who live, work or party there. In the premiere episode, meet the meter maids, go boating with The Mad Hueys and up close with the "sexy time" strippers.
