= Cindy Sargon =

Australian TV chef

Cindy Sargon is an Australian chef, entrepreneur, television presenter and voiceover artist.

== Career ==
=== Television ===
Sargon was a co-presenter on the third and fourth seasons of Surprise Chef. She has also hosted Melbourne Woman and the Australian version of Saturday Kitchen. She appeared on the first season of My Restaurant Rules in 2004; in 2007, she started hosting Food 4 Life on the Seven Network. Sargon also presented the IGA-sponsored 5-day meal planner segment on The Morning Show and was a presenter on Melbourne Weekender.

=== Other ===
In 1993 Sargon co-founded a wholesale pasta business, Alligator Brand, with husband Michael Coade. Alligator Brand provided pasta for the athletes at the 2000 Summer Olympics in Sydney, Australia. The company has also provided pasta for Qantas, Singapore Airlines and Korean Air, and has been sold in Costco, Thomas Dux and David Jones stores. Sargon and Coade also founded Per Tutti pasta.

Sargon posed for Black+White magazine in 2004. She previously presented a weekly restaurant review on 3AW's breakfast program, Breakfast with Ross & John, under the segment identity "Lazy Susan". Sargon is also a prolific commercial voiceover artist.

Sargon is the first official patron for the Artists for Kids Culture trust in Victoria.

== Personal life ==
Sargon is of Assyrian descent. She has a daughter with Coade, Pascale.
