= Lizzy Lovette =

Australian radio and TV presenter

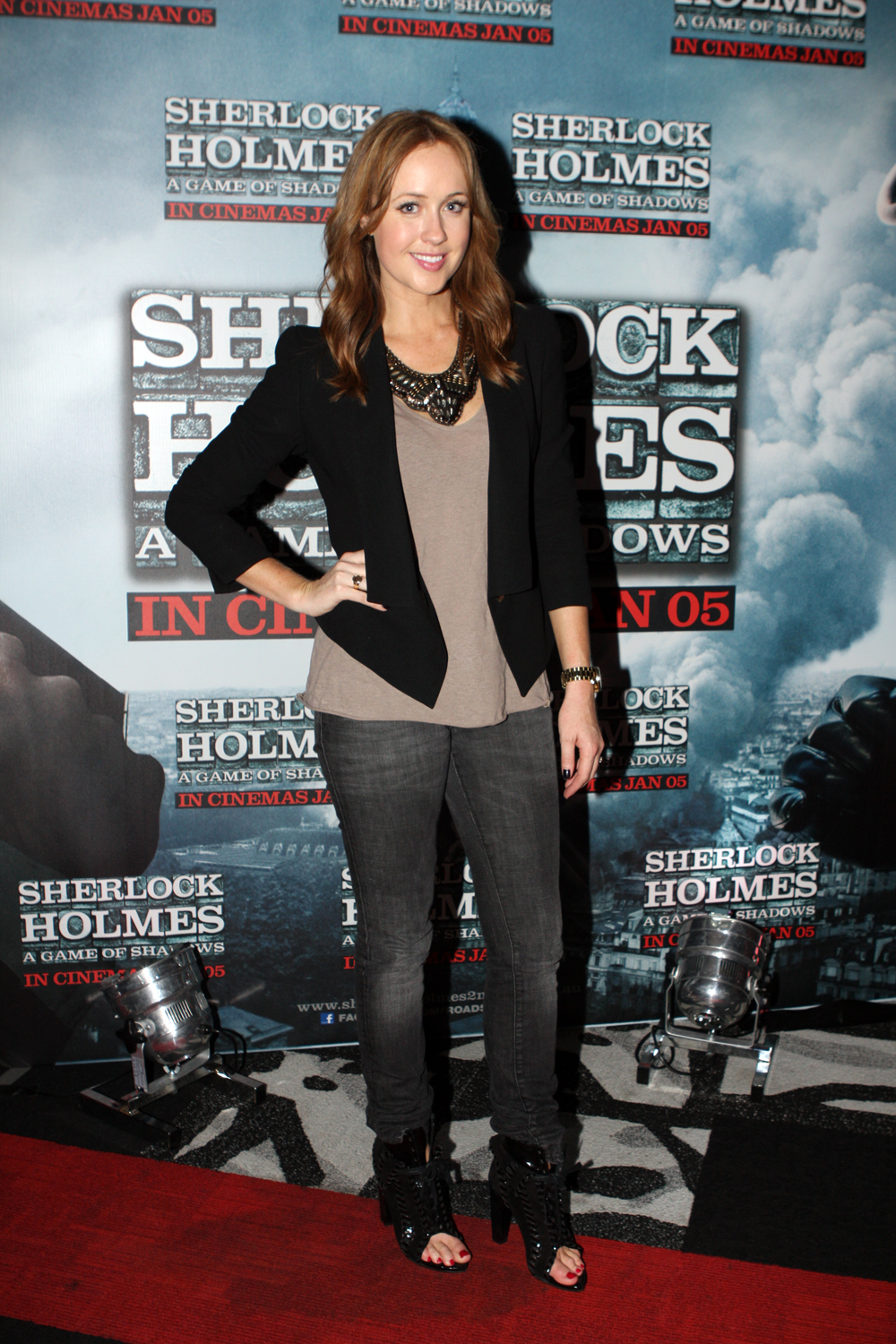
Lizzy Lovette as guest at Sherlock Holmes movie premiere, in December 2011

Elizabeth Lovette is an Australian radio presenter and TV presenter.

== Career ==
=== Radio ===
Lovette commenced her career in 2004 at 2Day FM Sydney as a presenter and 'Black Thunder' pilot. She moved to Nova 96.9 Sydney from 2004 to 2006, where in her first year she co-hosted the Nova 9's at night with David Campbell. In 2006, Lovette moved to host the morning shift.

She returned to 2Day FM from January 2007, co-hosting the Hot30 Countdown with Sam Mac. Lovette has also appeared on various shows such as The Kyle and Jackie O Show and Superfresh, and filled in on 2Day FM and Triple M Sydney.

In December 2009, Lovette filled in on the Today Network program Top 6 @ 6 with Daniel 'Danno' Cassin. Between 7 December and 18 December, Lovette co-hosted the Summer Breakfast show with Brian McFadden and Dave 'Higgo' Higgins right around the Today Network for breakfast from 6 am. She has also filled in on Take40 Australia for Jackie O and was the show's main fill-in co-host.

In August 2015, Lovette returned to radio to present a Saturday morning show on KIIS 1065. She departed the station in December 2016.

On 15 June 2019, Lovette returned to 2Day FM, again presenting on Saturday mornings.

Lovette returned in October 2021 to 2Day FM to host nights from 7pm to 10pm, then from February 2022 she is a weekend and weekday fill-in announcer.

=== Television ===
In 2005, Lovette joined James Tobin to present the Seven Network's Saturday afternoon music show Eclipse Music TV.

In 2006, Lovette became co-host of the Seven Network's children's gameshow It's Academic.

In 2007, Lovette hosted Famous magazine's Famous Presents Hollywood Uncensored.

In 2008, Lovette was the host of The Music Jungle up until March 2009.

In 2009 to present, Lovette is a part of StarPics on FOXTEL's Movie Network Channel and she is featured as a guest regular on Tuesdays edition of The Morning Show with Larry and Kylie for celebrity gossip.

Occasionally, Lovette is on the Nine Network's 20 to 1 as a media commentator. She has also filled in for Richard Wilkins on Today during the 2011/2012 summer period.

At the end of September 2015, Lovette started appearing as a presenter on Sydney Weekender.
