= My Generation (Australian game show) =

Australian television game show

- Genre: Game Show
- Presented by: Jeff Phillips (season 1); Tony Johnston
- Country of origin: Australia
- Original language: English

Production
- Running time: 24 minutes
- Production company: PRO Television

Original release
- Network: Nine Network
- Release: 1995 – 1996

My Generation is a general knowledge trivia show. Hosted by Jeff Phillips and later Tony Johnston on the Nine Network in 1995–1996, each episode would be played by two 2-member teams, each consisting of a kid and an adult.

There would be a board of general topics and both teams would try to answer a question to determine who got to pick the topic. 30 seconds was given to answer a series of questions on that topic and would keep going until all the options had gone.

Then there would be a round where both generations would play a video game where they would switch over in between, mostly Ridge Racer and Extreme Games on PlayStation.

Then in the final round, the teams were given 90 seconds of questions.
