= Jack Yabsley =

Australian television presenter and filmmaker

- Born: Sydney, New South Wales, Australia
- Education: Charles Sturt University
- Occupations: Filmmaker, television presenter
- Employer: Seven Network
- Known for: Totally Wild (2004–2006); Saturday Disney (2007–2011); Match It (2012–2014)

Jack Yabsley is an Australian filmmaker and former television presenter. He has worked extensively in children's television and documentary.

== Education ==
Yabsley attended Kiama High School, Coonabarabran Public School, and Middleton Primary School in Parkes.

He studied broadcast journalism at Charles Sturt University, in Bathurst, and completed a postgraduate degree in Screen Directing at AFTRS, Sydney.

== Career ==
=== Television ===
Yabsley's television career started as a presenter on Totally Wild on Network Ten, where he hosted over 100 episodes from 2004 to 2006.

He then moved to the Seven Network, where he was a host on Saturday Disney on Australia's from 3 February 2007 until 2011. He then became host of the game show Match It, also on Seven, from 2012.

Yabsley has been an occasional reporter for Sydney Weekender on the Seven Network. In 2023, he was the creator and lead writer of ABC comedy series Gold Diggers.

=== Film ===
Yabsley's debut feature documentary, Kings of Baxter, premiered at Antenna Documentary Film Festival in 2017, where it won Best Australian Film and Audience Choice Award. The film follows Bell Shakespeare's drama outreach program in Frank Baxter Juvenile Justice Centre, as a group of young offenders attempt to stage a production of Macbeth inside the centre for their fellow detainees. The documentary was screened on Foxtel Arts in 2018.

Yabsley's comedy short films The Virgin (2017), and Super Nice (2018) both premiered at Flickerfest Short Film Festival in Sydney, and went on to play at international film festivals around the world, gaining awards for best actor and best screenplay. The Virgin won the 20th Anniversary Award for Best Antipodes' Short Film at the Antipodean Film Festival in Saint Tropez, France.

=== Theatre ===
Yabsley is writing the book for the new Sydney Theatre Company musical Whispering Jack that opens in November 2026 in Sydney that will bring John Farnham's story to life on stage.

== Filmography ==
Yabsley's writing and directing credits include:

- The Donation (2015)
- Kings of Baxter (2017)
- The Virgin (2017)
- Super Nice (2018)
- Mardi Gras + Me for ABC Me (2018)
- Gogglebox Australia (2021)
- Gold Diggers (2023)
