= Surveillance Oz: Dash Cam =

- Genre: Factual
- Narrated by: Eden Falk
- Country of origin: Australia
- Original language: English
- No. of seasons: 3
- No. of episodes: 12

Production
- Running time: 21–22 minutes
- Production company: Seven Studios

Original release
- Network: Seven Network
- Release: 21 May 2015 – present

Related
- Surveillance Oz

Surveillance Oz: Dash Cam is an Australian factual television series and take a look into the shocking accidents and road rage incidents caught on camera across the roads of Australia. Screened on the Seven Network that premiered on 21 May 2015 with a double episode, before returning in November 2015 with 4 more episodes. A second season began screening in October 2017 and the season contained 6 episodes.

== About ==
Take a look into the shocking accidents and road rage incidents caught on camera across the roads of Australia.

== Series overview ==
Series	Episodes	Originally released	
Series	Episodes	First released	Last released
1	6	21 May 2015	26 November 2015
2	6	25 October 2017	2017
3	6	12 August 2021	2021

== Episodes ==
=== Series 1 (2015) ===
No. overall	No. in series	Title	Original release date	Australian viewers
1	1	"Episode 1"	21 May 2015	688,000
A Townsville driver runs a red light and lands on its roof, leaving a young girl hanging upside down.
2	2	"Episode 2"	21 May 2015	688,000
A Townsville driver runs a red light and lands on its roof, leaving a young girl hanging upside down.
3	3	"Episode 3"	5 November 2015	660,000
A young surfer narrowly misses being crushed by an out of control car, a young woman goes to the rescue when a motorcyclist is caught up in an ugly road rage incident and a L plater flips her car on a busy freeway.
4	4	"Episode 4"	12 November 2015	584,000
A motorcyclist is rammed from behind in a 3 car pile-up, a paramedic is first on scene after a car rolls 5 times at high speed right in front of him and a car enthusiast has a head on with a truck.
5	5	"Episode 5"	19 November 2015	605,000
A terrible crash captured on helmet cam leaves a young motorcyclist fighting for her life, a near miss with a driver who fell asleep at the wheel and a road rage attack by a skateboarder leaves bystanders shocked.
6	6	"Episode 6"	26 November 2015	623,000
A frightening encounter with a man in the middle of a lonely road, a P plater makes a split second bad decision at an intersection and an illegal U turn causes chaos.

=== Series 2 (2017) ===
No. overall	No. in series	Title	Original release date	Australian viewers
7	1	"Episode 1"	25 October 2017	N/A
A violent road rage attack with a baseball bat, a motorcyclist has a head-on crash on a wet road, a series of rear-enders for a towie, and a dash cam catches an incredible lightning strike.
8	2	"Episode 2"	25 October 2017	N/A
A car flips on a busy freeway, a miraculous near miss as a truck jackknifes on a narrow country road, a small child runs onto the road, and a spectacular skid on a motorbike.
9	3	"Episode 3"	2017	N/A
A freak accident for a motorcyclist as a truck blows a tyre, a multi-car pile-up on the freeway, a show-off on a bike loses control, and a hoon does a burnout right in front of police.
10	4	"Episode 4"	2017	N/A
A nasty rollover after driving through a stop sign, an argument over a hit and run, and a pedestrian takes his life into his hands as he tries to dodge the traffic.
11	5	"Episode 5"	2017	N/A
A road rage incident sends a driver over an embankment, a truck is forced off the road by someone else's stupidity, and trail bike riders are shocked when their mate suddenly disappears.
12	6	"Episode 6"	2017	N/A
A man is hit on busy freeway, while fully loaded truck loses its brake function. And an angry man threatens another driver, while a thief is caught red-handed, breaking into cars.

=== Series 3 (2021) ===
It was confirmed by Seven Studios that a 3rd series has been produced.

No. overall	No. in series	Title	Original release date	Australian viewers
13	1	"Episode 1"	12 August 2021	N/A
Every day thousands of dashcam cameras in cars are monitoring what goes on across the roads of Australia. Tonight, see the shocking accidents, road rage incidents and dangerous driving on our roads.
14	2	"Episode 2"	19 August 2021	N/A
Every day thousands of dashcam cameras in cars are monitoring what goes on across the roads of Australia. Tonight, a Queensland flower grower is hit by an out of control truck in torrential rain.
15	3	"Episode 3"	9 September 2021	N/A
Every day thousands of dashcam cameras in cars are monitoring what goes on across the roads of Australia. Tonight, see the shocking accidents, road rage incidents and dangerous driving on our roads.
16	4	"Episode 4"	16 September 2021	N/A
Every day thousands of dashcam cameras in cars are monitoring what goes on across the roads of Australia. Tonight, see the shocking accidents, road rage incidents and dangerous driving on our roads.
17	5	"Episode 5"	2021	N/A
Every day thousands of dashcam cameras in cars are monitoring what goes on across the roads of Australia. Tonight, see the shocking accidents, road rage incidents and dangerous driving on our roads.
18	6	"Episode 6"	2021	N/A
Every day thousands of dashcam cameras in cars are monitoring what goes on across the roads of Australia. Tonight, see the shocking accidents, road rage incidents and dangerous driving on our roads.
