= Food 4 Life =

Australian television series

Food 4 Life was an Australian television series on the Seven Network hosted by Cindy Sargon. It aired in 2007. When it was on air, it aired daily at 10:00am weekdays.

== See also ==
- List of Australian television series
