= James Sherry =

Australian actor and television producer

- Born: 14 November 1967 (age 58); Australia
- Occupations: Television presenter, actor, producer
- Years active: 1987–present

James Sherry (born 14 November 1967) is an Australian television presenter, actor, and producer.

== Career ==
Sherry has hosted several children's shows, including Saturday Disney (1990 to 1994) and A*mazing (1994 to 1998). He has had guest roles in television dramas, including Spellbinder in 1995, The Man From Snowy River in 1996, Blue Heelers in 1999, and McLeod's Daughters in 2002. He almost became host of the 2003 revival of Australia's version of The Price is Right, but the Nine Network informed him that Larry Emdur (who had hosted the 1993–1998 version) would host.

Sherry is also an announcer at international cricket matches in Australia and used to regularly host Saturday Lotto, Oz Lotto and Powerball draws.

Sherry was an MC at Australian Football League games held at Docklands Stadium and the Melbourne Cricket Ground; he always wore the colours of the home team. In recent years, however, he has focused on production work.

Sherry has produced the "Open Drive" segment on broadcasts of the Australian Open tennis. At the 2025 Australian Open, Sherry made a comment towards American player Ben Shelton that Shelton felt was rude and disrespectful, with Shelton later objecting to it in a post-match press conference. Sherry had asked Shelton, "You're going to be playing the winner of Jannik Sinner and Alex de Minaur. The crowd are going to be on the other guy's side, aren't they?"

In March 2020, Sherry was a contestant on ABC's Hard Quiz, hosted by Tom Gleeson. His chosen expert topic was 1990s Disney Cartoons. He was runner-up to an expert on Nirvana lead singer Kurt Cobain.
