= The Pink Panther in: Pink at First Sight =

- Written by: Owen Crump; D.W. Owen
- Directed by: Bob Richardson
- Voices of: Frank Welker; Marilyn Schreffler; Hal Smith; Brian Cummings; Weaver Copeland
- Music by: Steven DePatie
- Country of origin: United States
- Original language: English

Production
- Producer: David H. DePatie
- Running time: 30 minutes
- Production companies: Marvel Productions; Mirsch-Geoffrey-DePatie-Freleng

Original release
- Network: ABC
- Release: February 14, 1981

The Pink Panther in: Pink at First Sight is a 1981 American animated Valentine's Day special, starring The Pink Panther, that premiered on ABC on February 14, 1981 and the third and final Pink Panther special on ABC, following 1978's A Pink Christmas and 1980's Olym-Pinks. This would be the very first (and lone) Pink Panther cartoon from Marvel Productions.

== Plot ==
It is Valentine's Day and the Pink Panther is lonely and has no money (except for seven cents). After receiving another person's Valentine gift package by mistake, he goes to the messenger service for a job but messes his rehearsal up. He then goes to a store, buys a cassette player and pre-recorded cassettes with the seven cents he had left and goes back to the messenger service miming to Enrico Caruso's version of "Vesti la giubba", an aria from Ruggero Leoncavallo's opera Pagliacci, and gets hired as a messenger.

Antics on the job entangle the breezy cat with a jealous husband (after stealing the heart of his housewife whilst miming a 50s-ish sounding ballad), a snobby classic violinist (after using a Stradivarius violin like an electric guitar; the Panther had the wrong recording on at the time), a priest (whom the Panther had delivered the wrong present to) and a crime boss named Big Joe and his gang (their present was a bomb).

Finally, after warding off Big Joe and his gang with a cassette containing excerpts of a police radio show (and inadvertently putting them in the sight of the actual police), our hero is sitting alone and discouraged on a park bench when he finally meets the pantheress of his dreams, the ideal feline valentine.

== Voice cast ==
- Frank Welker - The Jester, Messenger Owner, The Man with the Golf Club, Violinist, Customer, The Baby, Tough Gangsters
- Marilyn Schreffler - The Baby's Mother, The Lady with the Umbrella, Nurse, Housewife, Maid
- Hal Smith - Big Joe, Priest, Thugs
- Brian Cummings - Music Store Owner, Tough Gangsters
- Weaver Copeland - Announcer

== Home media ==
After its original network broadcast, Pink at First Sight made its debut release on VHS by MGM/UA Home Video sometime during the 1980s. On November 6, 2007, the special along with Olym-Pinks and A Pink Christmas was released as part of The Pink Panther: A Pink Christmas "single-disc" DVD collection from MGM Home Entertainment and 20th Century Fox Home Entertainment (until June 30, 2020).

== Production ==
Most of the animation staff utilized for The All New Pink Panther Show worked on Pink at First Sight, which also utilized several music cues from the series as well but unlike that program, a laugh track wasn't featured. Friz Freleng was not on board, thus making this David DePatie's first (and only) solo work on a Pink Panther production without him. Many of the other characters' voices for this special were done by Frank Welker, Marilyn Schreffler, Hal Smith, Brian Cummings and Weaver Copeland.
