= A*mazing =

- Genre: Game show
- Created by: Michael Boughen; Hal McElroy
- Written by: Luke Bolland; Nia Pericles
- Directed by: Steve Quartly
- Presented by: James Sherry
- Narrated by: Gary Clare (1994); Mark Malone (1995–1996); Jason Walkerden (1997); Darren de Mello (1998)
- Theme music composer: Clive Young
- Country of origin: Australia
- Original language: English
- No. of seasons: 10
- No. of episodes: 650

Production
- Executive producers: Wayne Cameron; Michael Boughen
- Producers: Rob Gillow; Anne Gillow
- Production locations: Brisbane, Queensland (1994–1996); Perth, Western Australia (1997–1998)
- Cinematography: Mike Deegan; Darren Dunstan; Steve Giumelli; Ray Grenfell; Nathan Hayter; Matt Hyett
- Camera setup: Multi-camera
- Running time: 26 minutes
- Production company: Southern Star Group

Original release
- Network: Seven Network
- Release: 16 May 1994 – 1998

Related
- Time Masters

A*mazing is an Australian children's television game show that aired from 16 May 1994 until 1998 on the Seven Network. It was famous for a relatively large and elaborate maze/obstacle course that was part of the show's studio set. A*mazing was hosted by James Sherry for the entire run of the series. A*mazing was produced at Channel 7 in Brisbane from 1994 to 1996 and then at Channel 7 in Perth from 1997 to 1998.

== Format ==
The show pitted teams from two different primary schools against each other during the course of a week. Points gained by each contestant during the week would be totalled up to decide the winning school at the end of each week. There were two rounds of a game called "Timezone", each followed by a maze run, then the contestants competed in a "computer challenge" on a video game.

=== Timezone ===
In Timezone, a 90-second countdown timer begins, and Sherry begins to provide clues to a word or phrase to the first school's contestants. Contestants have to correctly guess the word or phrase before running down to a large QWERTY keyboard mounted on the floor and stepping on the letters to spell it out. The process is repeated for the second school. If contestants were unable to guess the word initially, the clues would get easier until the word was spelled out by Sherry. The time remaining determines how many points they get, plus how long each school gets to spend in the maze during round two.

=== Maze Run ===
After both teams had completed Timezone, one contestant from each school would enter the maze and attempt to collect the letters of the answer which are hidden in such places as a garbage can, or behind a mock cactus. Ten points are given for every letter they retrieve inside the maze before their time runs out.

Occasionally, the maze would include letters that are not part of the answer; if a contestant collected these superfluous letters, they would not receive any extra points in addition to the points earned by collecting the valid letters.

=== Computer Challenge ===
After the teams had completed two maze runs, the contestants competed in a video game face off. Gaming platforms, all provided by sponsor Nintendo, were used during the course of the show, such as Super Nintendo Entertainment System and Nintendo 64.

Games played included Tetris, Bubsy, Donkey Kong Country, Donkey Kong Country 2: Diddy's Kong Quest, Super Mario World, Nigel Mansell's World Championship, Plok, Pac-Attack, 1080° Snowboarding, Donkey Kong Country 3: Dixie Kong's Double Trouble!, Wave Race 64, Super Mario Kart, Mario Kart 64, San Francisco Rush, Multi-Racing Championship, Cruis'n USA, Diddy Kong Racing, Super Mario 64, Unirally, Winter Gold, Super Mario Bros. 3, Super Tennis, Cruis'n World, and the fly-swatting minigame from Mario Paint.

The team with the most points/fastest time win 50 points for their team, while runners-up in this challenge win 25 points for their team. Should there be a tie (e.g. both teams score the same number of coins in Super Mario Kart or hit the same number of flies in the fly-swatting mini-game from Mario Paint), both teams score 25 points each. Originally, 100 points were awarded to the winners and 50 points to the runners-up.

=== Bonus Round ===
After the third round, the team with the highest score would then go back to the maze for 90 seconds (later changed to 120 seconds) to collect keys. One player will choose which side of the maze they want to explore. Only when that player exits that maze can the other player enter the other half of the maze. There were seven keys, including a bonus one, in the maze; each key was worth 100 points. If either of the contestants found the bonus key, then both of the contestants would each get an original Game Boy (also provided by Nintendo), which later became a Game Boy Pocket. Only once were all seven keys found in the maze (under the 90-second rule limit).

If there was a tie after the third round, a sudden-death question was read out to both teams in the style of the first round, and whoever answered the question correctly would technically win the game for the day and go into the maze to search for the keys.

By the end of the week, the school with the highest number of points would win a grand prize, which was usually educational computer software or an encyclopedia set. Other prizes included tickets to the Wet'n'Wild theme park in Gold Coast, Australia.
