= Geoff Cox =

Australian musician (born 1951)

- Born: 13 March 1951 (age 75); St Kilda, Victoria, Australia
- Presenting career
- Show: Coxy's Big Break
- Stations: Seven Melbourne; Prime Victoria
- Time slot: Saturday 5.30 pm
- Country: Australia
- Website: www.coxy.com.au

Geoff Cox (born 13 March 1951) is an Australian musician and media personality. He is often referred to as "Coxy".

As a musician, Cox is most notable for having played drums with Brian Cadd and with the bands Cycle, The Bootleg Family Band, and Avalanche. He also filled in as drummer with the Little River Band while Derek Pellicci recovered from burns following a barbecue accident. He later became a light entertainment presenter on the Seven Network. In the 2000s, he hosted the travel program Coxy's Big Break.

Cox has been an Australia Day Ambassador. He has supported other charitable causes, including the Cabrini Institute and Zoos Victoria.

In 2008, Cox survived bowel cancer.

One of his earliest TV performances was on Countdown in a short documentary which led viewers through the process of making Australian Crawl's single "Beautiful People".
