= Young Seven =

- Genre: Children's television
- Presented by: Don Bennetts; Madeline Burke
- Country of origin: Australia
- Original language: English

Production
- Running time: 45 minutes; 60 minutes

Original release
- Network: HSV-7
- Release: 1957 – 1960

Young Seven is an Australian television series which aired 1957 to 1960 on Melbourne station HSV-7. Originally hosted by Don Bennetts and later by Madeline Burke, it was a children's series aired in an unusual 45-minute time-slot, though towards the end of its run it aired in a 60-minute time-slot. Running time excluding commercials is not known. It was made up of various segments, including "Youth Takes a Bow" and cartoons. In early 1958, it aired at 5:15 p.m., aired against Happy Show on GTV-9 and Children's TV Club on ABV-2. All three series consisted of a mix of local and imported segments.
