= Time Masters (game show) =

- Genre: Game show
- Created by: Michael Boughen; Wayne Cameron
- Directed by: Robert Burton
- Creative director: Michael Boughen
- Presented by: Tony Johnston
- Narrated by: Mark Malone (1996-1997); Jason Walkerden (1997-1998)
- Country of origin: Australia
- Original language: English
- No. of seasons: 3
- No. of episodes: 195

Production
- Executive producers: Wayne Cameron; Michael Boughen
- Producer: Bob Gillow
- Production locations: Brisbane, Queensland (1996); Perth, Western Australia (1997-1998)
- Running time: 26 minutes
- Production company: Southern Star Group

Original release
- Network: Seven Network
- Release: 1 April 1996 – 1998

Related
- A*mazing; Wipeout

Time Masters is an Australian children's game show hosted by Tony Johnston from 1996 to 1998 on the Seven Network. Running for three seasons, Tony would meet the two school teams consisting of two players each. The teams then participated in three rounds of games, competing for points. After five days of play, the winning school would take home the major prize, whilst the losing school would take home a runners up prize. In each of the five daily episodes, players won player's prizes, and for Scramble, the fastest player also won a watch. In 1998, the show ended and was replaced with Wipeout a year later, also hosted by Johnston.

== Season One ==
=== Brain Strain ===
A board of six themed answers were presented at the top of the course alongside numbered buttons. Once Tony asked the player their question, they would have to navigate through a specially designed obstacle course consisting of a Flying Fox, the 'Wobbly Planks' (a two segment walkway moving in opposite directions) and the 'Groove Tube' (a revolving pipe) before hitting the button that corresponded with their answer. There were five questions and six answers in total, meaning that a correct answer would remove it from play and therefore as a possibility to be selected again. There was a two minute time limit, and the total score awarded would depend on how many questions were answered correctly.

=== Scramble ===
In Scramble, the object was to retrace a pattern shown on a light up board by stepping on a selected tile from each row. The players were shown the correct pattern three times after Tony had asked the question, and they had 15 seconds to retrace the correct pattern. Once at the top of the board, they had to select the two correct options out of the four possible choices, as these were always two part questions. If the player selected the right answer first, the game would register their next button hit, whereas if they hit either of the decoy answers, the buttons would turn red instead of green and their turn would be over. Each player from one school had two turns, and then the next school players came on for their turns. The player who achieved the fastest time to scale the board correctly and input both right answers won a Lorus watch.

After Scramble, the second team would play Brain Strain.

=== Superball ===
Tony would give clues to the answer of a puzzle, and when guessed, the players would have to run to the end of the set to retrieve lettered balls from a chute. The aim was to spell out the usually seven letter answer of the clue with these plastic balls, in the quickest possible time whilst avoiding running back with letters not in the answer. The time limit for the game was one minute.

== Season Two and Three ==
=== Slam Dunk ===
Slam Dunk replaced Brain Strain, but retained the same game board. Like before, there were five themed questions, whilst the game board presented six possible answers (and the category). In order to hit the buttons, the players would have to shoot a basketball from the key into the correctly numbered hoop. If a ball was aimed at one hoop and ended up bouncing into an unintended hoop, this would register the same as an incorrect answer. This round gave players 75 seconds to answer all five questions - including any they may have missed earlier by selecting an incorrect hoop, if time allowed. Points were allotted based on the number of correct answers, and if all five questions were completed correctly before the timer was up, the players stood by as a student from their opposing school was dunked into a vat of water on set.

=== Scramble ===
The Scramble setup was unchanged from the first series, and featured the same five tile wide, nine tile long course and rules.

After Scramble, the team that did not play Slam Dunk earlier had their turn to play.

=== Pit Stop ===
An Arcade Driving Game, Manx TT, played simultaneously, was the only game in the show's run to do so. Once one player completed one lap, they would need to jump off and let their teammate compete the second lap. The team that came first won the points for this round.

== Trivia ==
- The show was rerun in 1999–2003 on Disney Channel.
- This show was produced by the same team as A*mazing and ran alternating seasons to the show.
- When Time Masters moved location, A*mazing, which also moved locations incorporated the 'Wobbly Planks' (minus the obstacles) and the 'Groove Tube' into their redesigned maze.
