= Surveillance Oz =

- Genre: Factual
- Narrated by: Eden Falk
- Country of origin: Australia
- Original language: English
- No. of seasons: 5
- No. of episodes: 30

Production
- Running time: Approx 30 minutes (including commercials)

Original release
- Network: Seven Network
- Release: 3 October 2012 – present

Related
- Surveillance Oz: Dash Cam

Surveillance Oz is an Australian factual television series screened on the Seven Network that premiered in October 2012. In May 2015, spin-off series Surveillance Oz: Dash Cam launched.

In March 2019, Seven Studios announced that Surveillance Oz will return with Season 6 in 2021.

== About ==
Surveillance OZ is about the use of surveillance footage in Australia, including CCTV and public cameras. The series displays footage of dangerous driving, risky behavior, accidents and criminal activities. The show is about how surveillance footage can be used to document incidents and assist in official investigations.

== Series overview ==
Series	Episodes	Originally released	
Series	Episodes	First released	Last released
1	6	3 October 2012	7 November 2012
2	6	24 July 2013	27 November 2013
3	6	9 November 2014	23 November 2014
4	6	21 August 2016	4 August 2016
5	6	9 November 2016	23 August 2018
6	6	12 June 2021	4 December 2021
Specials	2	22 June 2017	29 June 2017

== Episodes ==
=== Series 1 (2012) ===
No. overall	No. in series	Title	Original release date	Australian viewers
1	1	"Episode 1"	3 October 2012	1,006,000
Harbour Tunnel controllers witness a traffic stopping domestic dispute in the Sydney Harbour Tunnel. Then, a train driver's worst nightmare as a young man runs right in front of the Train.
2	2	"Episode 2"	10 October 2012	1,051,000
A speeding train is heading straight for a truck that's stuck on a level crossing. Criminals ram-raid a pharmacy in search of drugs and a motorcyclist's tricky manoeuvre in the Sydney Harbour Tunnel almost ends in tragedy.
3	3	"Episode 3"	17 October 2012	1,125,000
A young woman is harassed in a tunnel by a menacing 40 ton truck and there's nowhere to escape. Drivers going the wrong way cause havoc on major freeways. And a young man narrowly misses death at a railway station.
4	4	"Episode 4"	24 October 2012	1,100,000
An argument outside a carpark turns into a massive brawl, a road rage incident leads to a driverless runaway car, graffiti vandals are caught by CCTV and a man risks his life on the freeway to change a tyre.
5	5	"Episode 5"	31 October 2012	1,089,000
A thief shows CCTV cameras more than he intended, a man dices with death at a train station, and in the battle between bike rider and boom pole, boom pole always wins.
6	6	"Episode 6"	7 November 2012	1,021,000
A traffic holdup has hundreds of drivers heading the wrong way towards speeding vehicles, a police pursues a criminal through busy inner city Melbourne, and CCTV operators know that the full moon always brings trouble.

=== Series 2 (2013) ===
No. overall	No. in series	Title	Original release date	Australian viewers
1	7	"Episode 1"	24 July 2013	653,000
An extraordinary moment as a child slips through the cracks between a platform and a train. A man takes a deadly walk through a tunnel and brings the city to a standstill.
2	8	"Episode 2"	24 July 2013	713,000
Three young men attempt to climb onto the roof of their fast moving taxi in the Sydney Harbour Tunnel, then, a man in a wheelchair topples onto the tracks seconds before a train arrives
3	9	"Episode 3"	6 November 2013	405,000
High speed surveillance from Victoria Police Airwing monitor a wanted man, a drunk driver leaves a trail of destruction at a car park and a car is clipped by a truck in the Sydney Harbour Tunnel.
4	10	"Episode 4"	13 November 2013	N/A
A man attempts to take a dangerous shortcut across a train platform, Police track a stolen car from the ground and air and vandals toy with their lives as they graffiti a train in Adelaide.
5	11	"Episode 5"	20 November 2013	367,000
Shop security cameras capture a late night robbery, a disorientated man stumbles onto the tracks seconds before a train arrives and a truck on fire in a tunnel quickly becomes a deadly situation.
6	12	"Episode 6"	27 November 2013	368,000
A cyclist gambles with his life when he travels in the wrong direction down the Sydney Harbour Tunnel and Melbourne Police head on a high- speed chase to capture a stolen van.

=== Series 3 (2014) ===
No. overall	No. in series	Title	Original release date	Australian viewers
1	13	"Episode 1"	9 November 2014	932,000
A man dangles a child over train tracks, and a brazen man tries to steal a snake.
2	14	"Episode 2"	9 November 2014	932,000
Operators are stunned when they see the lifeless body of a man being removed from a car on a Sydney motorway.
3	15	"Episode 3"	16 November 2014	879,000
One small mistake with a jerry can turns deadly in a flash at a busy petrol station. A drunk driver sends sparks flying when he crashes his car.
4	16	"Episode 4"	16 November 2014	879,000
A Melbourne mother flies into a rage and attempts to kick passing vehicles. Plus, a dash cam captures a driver’s momentary lapse in concentration.
5	17	"Episode 5"	23 November 2014	870,000
A man has a medical emergency on the escalator of Kings Cross station, and a woman risks her life on train tracks for a pair of shoes.
6	18	"Episode 6"	23 November 2014	870,000
A busy petrol station is put in danger after one little mistake with a jerry can. Plus, a drunk driver sends sparks flying during a car crash.

=== Series 4 (2016) ===
No. overall	No. in series	Title	Original release date	Australian viewers
1	19	"Episode 1"	21 July 2016	520,000
A man trips and spins into a speeding train then onto the tracks. Also, a shopkeeper confronts an armed robber, and a man takes a walk through a tunnel and doesn't want to stop for police.
2	20	"Episode 2"	21 July 2016	514,000
An unusual visitor to a country train station causes confusion among patrons. Plus an amazing and lucky escape from a rear-ender.
3	21	"Episode 3"	28 July 2016	460,000
A spectacular crash as a car flies through a train station and onto the tracks. Later, jewel thieves attack a store with a hammer while the owner is in there and a man has a fit of rage in a car park.
4	22	"Episode 4"	28 July 2016	474,000
A store owner confronts an aggressive shoplifter. Also, a road rage incident in the Sydney Harbour Tunnel creates chaos and a car crashes through a busy supermarket
5	23	"Episode 5"	4 August 2016	435,000
A terrified woman in a small car is pushed through the tunnel by a huge truck. Later, thieves try to break open a ticket machine with a blowtorch.
6	24	"Episode 6"	4 August 2016	478,000
An examination of how helpful every day surveillance cameras can be when it comes to catching criminals and preventing crime.

=== Series 5 (2016–2018) ===
No. overall	No. in series	Title	Original release date	Australian viewers
7	25	"Episode 1"	9 November 2016	Not In Top 20
Something is making people ill in a train station tunnel, a ram raid destroys a business and a truck comes incredibly close to pedestrians.
8	26	"Episode 2"	9 November 2016	Not In Top 20
An examination of how helpful every day surveillance cameras can be when it comes to catching criminals and preventing crime.
8	27	"Episode 3"	29 June 2018	Not In Top 20
A risk-taking pedestrian toys with death on the freeway and a drunk man falls on the tracks in peak hour. Plus, a group of thieves literally get a massive shock and a ram raid goes horribly wrong.
8	28	"Episode 4"	9 August 2018	Not In Top 20
A terrifying moment when a child slips between the train and the track, everything that can go wrong does in a car park, and budgie brings the train network to a stop.
9	29	"Episode 5"	16 August 2018	Not In Top 20
Teenagers become trapped inside an elevator that they covered in graffiti, an explosive crash turn bystanders into heroes, and a robbery doesn’t go to plan.
10	30	"Episode 6"	23 August 2018	Not In Top 20
Tonight, a car enters a tunnel on fire, someone threatens Sydney Trains with a bomb, a man tries to buy a drink after the bar has closed and a toddler stepping on to a train disappears onto the tracks.

=== Series 6 (2021) ===
No. overall	No. in series	Title	Original release date	Australian viewers
1	31	"Episode 1"	12 June 2021	N/A
A brazen art thief gets chased down by a quick-thinking chef, a wheel chair causes chaos in the Sydney Harbour Tunnel, and a man collapses onto the tracks with an express train bearing down.
2	32	"Episode 2"	19 June 2021	N/A
A Harley dealership is targeted by a gang of thieves, a truck's dramatic rollover brings an entire city to a grinding halt, and a woman tries to steal bras by stuffing them down her pants!
3	33	"Episode 3"	26 June 2021	N/A
Two bumbling thieves make a conspicuous getaway with an empty safe, a family business is the victim of a dramatic arson attack, and things get ridiculous when a do-it-yourself furniture removalist tries to catch a train.
4	34	"Episode 4"	3 July 2021	N/A
A passionate reptile keeper gets ripped off in his own home, cunning thieves manipulate an outdated security system, a dashcam captures a freak accident and an unfriendly neighbour is caught red handed.
5	35	"Episode 5"	21 August 2021	N/A
A group of teens go viral after their destructive and disgusting night is caught on CCTV, a brazen mother shocks everyone by teaching her young child to shoplift, and a community rallies together in support of a very special organisation.
6	36	"Episode 6"	4 December 2021	N/A
A man tries to out run a speeding train only to fall face first onto the tracks. When a taxidermy turtle is stolen it's up to two quick thinking ninjas to save the day.

=== Surveillance Oz Specials ===
No. overall	No. in series	Title	Original release date	Australian viewers
Special	1	"Australia's Dumbest Criminals"	22 June 2017	N/A
Special	2	"Crazy Carpark Capers"	29 June 2017	N/A

== See also ==
- List of Australian television series
