= What Really Happens in Thailand =

- Title card for What Really Happens in Thailand.
- Genre: Reality
- Country of origin: Australia
- Original language: English
- No. of seasons: 1
- No. of episodes: 10

Production
- Camera setup: Multiple
- Running time: 42 minutes
- Production company: McAvoy Media

Original release
- Network: Seven Network
- Release: 14 September 2015 – present

What Really Happens in Thailand is an Australian reality documentary television series that airs on the Seven Network.

The program was first announced at the network's upfronts in 2014. The series is a spin-off of the 2014 program What Really Happens in Bali and produced by the same production company McAvoy Media. The series films the activities and situations of Australian tourists and expats in various locations throughout Thailand, including nightclubs, hospitals and cosmetic surgery centres.

== Broadcast ==
The series premiered in Australia on the Seven Network on 14 September 2015, airing on Monday nights until the fifth episode of the series, when the show was moved to Thursday nights. After episode six, the series was pulled from the schedule until the television non-ratings period, when episode seven premiered on a Tuesday night however it did not reach the top 20 most watched programs for the first time in the program's season.

== Episodes ==
No.	Title	Original release date	Australian viewers
1	"Episode 1"	14 September 2015	633,000
A no-holds barred look at Australian tourists in one of the nation's favourite holiday destinations. In the premiere episode, follow two Perth beauty queens at a full moon party, a nurse who is taken to hospital suffering an undiagnosed illness and base jumpers achieving the ultimate rush.
2	"Episode 2"	21 September 2015	512,000
In this episode, meet the family dedicated to muay thai fighting, a couple looking to adopt a monkey and an Aussie ends up in hospital following a motorbike accident.
3	"Episode 3"	5 October 2015	474,000
Meet the ladyboys of Bangla Road, and a loan shark who is gaining a reputation in Pattaya.
4	"Episode 4"	12 October 2015	523,000
Meet an Australian women who has travelled to Thailand for breast augmentation surgery and music promoter Michael 'Chuggy' Chugg who moved from Australia to Phuket.
5	"Episode 5"	22 October 2015	342,000
See Australia Day done Thai style, an Australian ends up in hospital following a bike crash and the man dubbed the 'Prince of Poppies' meets his match.
6	"Episode 6"	29 October 2015	388,000
We celebrate New Year's Eve in Phuket, meet an AFL player living the beach lifestyle and a generous Aussie making a huge difference in the lives of the underprivileged.
7	"Episode 7"	1 December 2015	N/A
Mates from Brisbane learn about the dangers of full moon parties, a Mauy Thai fighter ends up in hospital and a couple risk Thailand's infamous Wipe-out course.
8	"Episode 8"	8 December 2015	N/A
Two groups of Australians compete in a Phi Phi party game, and a Boxing Day tsunami volunteer returns to Thailand.
9	"Episode 9"	15 December 2015	N/A
A traditional Thai fishing proves dangerous and a unique Bangla Road pub crawl.

== Spin-off ==
A second spin-off of the format followed in 2016, titled What Really Happens on the Gold Coast.
