= Match It =

- Genre: Game show
- Presented by: Jack Yabsley
- Country of origin: Australia
- Original language: English
- No. of series: 6
- No. of episodes: 390

Production
- Production locations: Melbourne, Victoria
- Running time: 30 minutes (including commercials)

Original release
- Network: Seven Network (2012); 7TWO (2013-2014)
- Release: 4 June 2012 – 2014

Match It is an Australian children's game show airing on the Seven Network on 4 June 2012, later on 7TWO in 2013, presented by Jack Yabsley. Two teams of primary school students compete on touchscreen 'pods', matching pairs of clues such as flags, photos, faces, and words. The fastest team, with the best memory wins. Each half hour episode sees four different rounds – Four in Your Face. Tag Team. Sound Round. Flash-Match and the nail-biting Mega-Match – with the successful team up for the chance to play for the title of weekly winner. The series' top eight teams will then battle it out in finals week for the chance to become 'Match It' champions and win a prize for their school. The studio game-show sees teams of Year Six school-kids using touch-screen technology and smartphone-style icons to match up multiple-choice answers to an array of questions – from pets to pop culture, sport, space and beyond.

== Winners ==
Smart Puppies won season 2 on 24 July 2013.

The Marvellous Midgets (Elliott Merryweather, Natalie Hooper & Bridget Spencer) won season 3 on 6 September 2013.

The Big Thinkers (Christopher, Tegan & Luke) defeated the Rocket Racers (Priscilla, Tilly & Spencer) by 360–300.
