= Towies =

Towies is an Australian reality television series which premiered on Netflix in 2016 and 7mate on 15 August 2017. The ten part, 30 minute series profiles the lives of the workers at Clayton's Towing. A second season screened on 7mate from 20 August 2019.

In 2020, Glenn, also known as Sheriff and Red Baron, was fired due to allegations of aggravated assault. He appeared in court the following year for further charges relating to sexual assault and abuse.

== See also ==
- Highway Thru Hell
- Heavy Rescue: 401
- Aussie Pickers
- Outback Truckers
- MegaTruckers
