= What Really Happens in Bali =

- Title card of What Really Happens in Bali
- No. of episodes: 7

Release
- Original network: Seven Network
- Original release: 27 May 2014

Series chronology
- Next → What Really Happens in Thailand

What Really Happens in Bali is a documentary television series that airs on the Seven Network on Monday nights at 9:00pm.

== Show details ==
The show premiered on Tuesday, 27 May at 8:45pm, however after three episodes, the show was moved to Mondays at 9:00pm, replacing Revenge, its third series having wrapped up broadcasting on Seven the previous Monday.

A spin-off of the series, What Really Happens in Thailand, filmed in Thailand premiered in September 2015.

A second spin-off premiered in 2016, titled What Really Happens on the Gold Coast.

== Synopsis ==
The documentary television series gives viewers unprecedented access to Bali, including various holiday spots and the infamous Kerobokan Prison, where the Bali Nine are currently incarcerated.
