= Weekender (TV series) =

Australian television series

Weekender is a Queensland-based lifestyle program screening on Sundays at 5:30pm.

== Production ==
Queensland Weekender began in 2003 on the Seven Network on Saturdays at 5:30pm. It was produced by 7 Productions Queensland and often aired alongside similarly themed Queensland lifestyle programs, Creek To Coast and The Great South East.

In November 2019, the Seven Network announced the show had been axed with the final episodes screening in early 2020. In January 2020, Seven announced Weekender, an amalgamated version of Queensland Weekender and The Great Day Out, would begin from 9 February 2020 on Sundays at 5:30pm.

== See also ==
- Sydney Weekender
- Melbourne Weekender
- WA Weekender
- SA Weekender
