= The Pink Panther in: A Pink Christmas =

- Directed by: Bill Perez
- Music by: Doug Goodwin
- Country of origin: United States

Production
- Producers: David H. DePatie; Friz Freleng
- Running time: 30 minutes
- Production companies: DePatie–Freleng Enterprises; The Mirisch Company; United Artists Television

Original release
- Network: ABC
- Release: December 7, 1978

The Pink Panther in: A Pink Christmas is a holiday-themed animated special, starring The Pink Panther. It first aired on ABC on December 7, 1978. A standalone follow-up special, A Very Pink Christmas, was released in 2011.

This is the first of three Pink Panther specials on ABC, followed by Olym-Pinks in 1980 and Pink at First Sight in 1981.

== Plot ==
The Pink Panther is homeless and wandering an early-20th century big city at Christmastime. Snow is on the ground and he is very cold and hungry. The cartoon follows his efforts to obtain food while overcoming crazy holiday mayhem in town. A chance discovery of a Santa suit leads to a job in the department store as Santa, but when he takes a bite out of a little girl's gingerbread man, he is chased around the department store by its manager, from whom he narrowly escapes. Among several other attempts of finding food following this, he also attempts to earn money by shoveling the snowy stairs of a nearby house and to get himself arrested in order to get a meal in jail (a plot point borrowed from O. Henry's classic story "The Cop and the Anthem"), but his efforts are thwarted at every turn.

After witnessing a robbery attempt with a police officer nearby, Pink chases after the cop's dropped doughnut which is rolling down the street. There, a little dog who is also hungry takes the doughnut, but Pink pushes him away and takes it for himself. After seeing the look on the little dog's face and realizing that his actions are not in line with the spirit of Christmas, the Pink Panther is ashamed of himself, and shares the doughnut with the dog. Then the Pink Panther goes back to the city park and the dog follows him. Suddenly, a little tree just beside the bench they sit on (the same bench that the panther sat on at the start of the special) magically becomes covered with candles, ornaments, and a star followed by a big table with an ample Christmas dinner magically dropping from the sky. Pink looks up to see that Santa has dropped the food, a reward for the panther's act of kindness toward the dog. He shares the dinner with the little dog and they both begin eating happily.

== Production ==
Most of the animation staff utilized for the 1978 made-for-television The All New Pink Panther Show worked on A Pink Christmas. The special also utilized several portions of the musical score that appeared on The All New Pink Panther Show as well.

== Home media ==
On November 6, 2007, the title special along with Olym-pinks and Pink at First Sight was released on the DVD collection The Pink Panther: A Pink Christmas from MGM Home Entertainment/20th Century Fox Home Entertainment.
