= The Pink Panther in: Olym-Pinks =

- Genre: Comedy; Sports
- Directed by: Friz Freleng
- Music by: Rob Walsh
- Country of origin: United States
- Original language: English

Production
- Producers: David H. DePatie; Friz Freleng
- Running time: 38 minutes
- Production companies: DePatie–Freleng Enterprises; The Mirisch Company; United Artists Television

Original release
- Network: ABC
- Release: February 22, 1980

The Pink Panther in: Olym-Pinks, is an animated sports-themed special featuring the Pink Panther. The show first aired on ABC on February 22, 1980 to coincide with the 1980 Winter Olympics. This was the last Pink Panther production to be produced by DePatie–Freleng Enterprises before reorganizing itself as Marvel Productions as well as the last Pink Panther production involving creator Friz Freleng. He soon before departed the company to return to Warner Bros. Animation.

The previous ABC Pink Panther special, A Pink Christmas, aired in 1978. A third special, Pink at First Sight was broadcast in 1981.

== Plot ==
In Lake Placid, New York, the Pink Panther and the Little Man are competitors in a series of Winter Olympic games. The problem is, the Little Man is a very bad sport who will resort to outrageously blatant cheating to win. Despite several comical mishaps (including being chased by a piano that seemingly wants his head on a silver platter, an upside-down chase through the snow after he and the Little Man fall off a ski lift, and having to saw his skis down after trying to get through a door while holding them widthwise), the Panther triumphs at downhill racing, ski jumping (after which he has to nurse the Little Man through a bad cold following a failed attempt by him to get a longer distance than the Panther did) and bobsledding and wins the Gold medal while the little man earns a Silver and his sneezing puts out the Olympic flame.

== Home media ==
On November 6, 2007, Olym-Pinks was released alongside A Pink Christmas and Pink at First Sight on the DVD collection The Pink Panther: A Pink Christmas from MGM Home Entertainment/20th Century Fox Home Entertainment.
