= Weekender (Devon newspaper) =

- Type: Weekly newspaper
- Format: Tabloid
- Owner(s): Northcliffe Newspapers Group
- Publisher: Westcountry Publications
- Editor: Brendan Hanrahan
- Founded: 18 March 1981
- Language: English
- Headquarters: Torquay, England
- Circulation: 55,746
- Price: Free

The Weekender was a free weekly newspaper covering Torbay and South Devon, published by the Westcountry Publications. The paper was published in two editions; the Torbay edition covered Torquay, Paignton, and Brixham, while the Newton & Teignbridge edition covered Newton Abbot and Kingsteignton.
