= WA Weekender =

WA Weekender is a travel and lifestyle show featuring destinations throughout Western Australia. The series ran from 1 August 2014 to 11 June 2017 and aired on Sundays at 5:30pm on the Seven Network in that state. The program visited various locations in Western Australia and looks at accommodation, dining and entertainment.

The Digital Imagineers Company managing director and executive producer, Stephen Aspinall said "The idea behind WA Weekender is to educate and inspire all West Australians to look up from their phone or get off the couch and have some genuine and authentic experiences." It was created by The Digital Imagineers Company for Channel 7 Perth.

== Presenters ==
- Dan Paris
- Haley Thompson
- Jessie James
- Sarah Danze
- Mat Dwyer

== See also ==
- Sydney Weekender
- Melbourne Weekender
- Queensland Weekender
- SA Weekender
