= Quiz Master =

- Genre: Game Show
- Presented by: Simon Reeve
- Country of origin: Australia
- Original language: English
- No. of seasons: 1

Production
- Running time: 30 minutes

Original release
- Network: Seven Network
- Release: 7 July – 28 July 2002

Quiz Master is an Australian game show series aired on the Seven Network in 2002. It was hosted by Simon Reeve.

== Gameplay ==
Four contestants, already renowned for their mastery of the question/answer format, challenge each other for the title of QuizMaster and a potential prize pool of $1,000,000.

There are essentially two components to the show. The first part involves five rounds of questions and answers, where contestants buzz in to give their response. (NOTE: The rules for each round differ slightly)

=== Round 1 ===
All contestants compete with each other to score the most points within the time limit. A correct answer results in the addition of 10 points to the score, an incorrect answer locks that player out for the next question.

=== Round 2: (Round of Team Play) ===
Each contestant, starting with the highest scorer, is allowed to choose a partner of their choice to work together in building a sizeable score, Each player take turns at answering questions, each time a player answers correctly, both teammates pick up 10 points. However, if a player answers incorrectly, then they must answer a further question correctly before passing onto their colleague.

=== Round 3: (Round of Point Steal) ===
Plays exactly as Round 1, except that a contestant who answers correctly nominates an opposing player to take 10 points from to add to their own score.

=== Round 4: (Round of Isolation) ===
Each contestant in turn chooses one other player to "isolate" . that player must play alone for 60 seconds against the other 3 players who work in a team. If one of the team members answers incorrectly, all team members are locked out. At the end of the round, the player with the lowest score is excluded from becoming QuizMaster, but can still influence the final result in Round 5.

=== Round 5 ===
Plays exactly like Round 3. However, the eliminated player from Round 4 is still permitted to answer questions and may distribute any points he/she earns to the player of their choice. the player with the highest score at the end of the round plays for the title of "QuizMaster".

The Second component sees the highest scorer attempting to answer 5 out of 10 questions to achieve the title of "QuizMaster". They nominate one of the other players to help them in their quest. In each show, $250,000 is added to the prize pool. The questions in this section of the show are extremely difficult but do not have time limits. the highest scorer attempts to answer each question in turn. If they don't know the answer, they can ask their partner to answer the question in their place. However, if that partner is called upon; that player can claim $50,000 from the prize pool for each question correctly answered. The prize pool is only handed out and the highest scorer named "QuizMaster" if 5 or more questions are answered correctly, otherwise; the pool jackpots into the next show. a successful "QuizMaster" is allowed to contest the next show and potentially pick up the entire prize pool of $1,000,000.

== International versions ==
| Country | Local name | Host | Top prize | Network | Aired |
|---|---|---|---|---|---|
| United Kingdom (pilot) | Ruthless | Christopher Price | Unknown | Unknown | Pilot not picked up |
