= Melbourne Weekender =

Australian television series

Melbourne Weekender is an Australian travel and lifestyle show featuring various locations in Melbourne and Victoria, and showing destinations and experiences which can be enjoyed on a weekend. The weekly, half-hour program is produced by Seven Productions.

== History ==
The series made its debut on 6 August 2005, gracing screens every Saturday at 5:30 pm. Initially hosted by Peter Mitchell, then later transitioned to Jo Silvagni. Produced by Dreampool Productions, the show showcased a dynamic roster of hosts exploring a multitude of themes ranging from gardening, pet care, and home improvement to fishing, boating, dining, entertainment, and recommendations for family outings across Melbourne.

On 27 June 2015, the show returned to air with host Cameron Ling and a team of reporters. A revival in 2019 was titled "The Great Weekend" and was presented by Jane Bunn, Brian Taylor, Jack Riewoldt, Brooke Hogan and Pete Lazer. The Great Weekend premiered on 24 February 2019 in Melbourne, screening nationally on 7two. In November 2019, the Seven Network announced the show had been cancelled with final episodes screening in early 2020.

In April 2024, the Seven Network revived Melbourne Weekender with a new presenting team consisting of Nicky Buckley, Gary Mehigan, Bonnie Anderson, Brad Hodge, Jane Bunn, Sonia Marinelli and Abbey Holmes. The show began airing from 14 April 2024 in a 5:30 pm timeslot.

== Presenters ==
=== Current ===
- Jane Bunn
- Bonnie Anderson
- Gary Mehigan
- Nicky Buckley
- Sonia Marinelli
- Brad Hodge
- Abbey Holmes

=== Past ===
- Cameron Ling
- Katrina Warren
- Matthew Richardson
- Erica Davis
- Bree Laughlin
- Jade Robran
- Russell Gilbert
- Cindy Sargon
- Kayne Tremills
- Peter Mitchell
- Mel Kotsos
- Andrew Laidlaw
- Arni Sleemen
- Reuben Buchanan
- Andrew Morley

== See also ==
- Sydney Weekender
- Queensland Weekender
- WA Weekender
- SA Weekender
