= Home in WA =

- Genre: Lifestyle
- Created by: Ron Redingius
- Written by: Ron Reddingius
- Country of origin: Australia
- Original language: English
- No. of seasons: 16
- No. of episodes: 500

Production
- Producer: Adrian Faure
- Production location: Perth, Western Australia
- Running time: approx. 22 minutes
- Production company: Reddingius Media PTY LTD

Original release
- Network: Seven Network (Western Australia)
- Release: 2000 – present

Home in WA is a local lifestyle show based in Perth. The show airs on Channel 7 Perth TVW

Home in WA shows a variety of products, builders, services and home furnishings, products and lifestyle ideas designed to assist people in Western Australia live well in their homes. The show is locally produced in Western Australia.

== Background ==
Home in WA is Western Australia's only locally produced 'home products' television series. It is filmed and edited on a weekly basis. The show is telecast on metro Channel Seven Perth and statewide on Channel Seven usually on Saturday or Sunday. Its usual slot is 4:30 pm.

Home in WA completed 685 episodes from inception in 2000 - 2022.
