= SA Weekender =

Television program spotlighting South Australia

SA Weekender is a travel, culture and lifestyle show featuring destinations throughout South Australia. The series first screened in 2017, replacing a similar series called SA Life and airs on Sundays at 5:30pm on the Seven Network in South Australia.

The program visits a range locations in South Australia and looks at accommodation, dining and entertainment. In November 2019, the Seven Network announced the show had been cancelled with final episodes screening in 2020. However it since returned for a range of special episodes from February to September 2020 screening locally and nationally across the Seven Network.

SA Weekender has since returned for a full 2021 series exploring the best attractions, experiences and destinations across South Australia. All episodes are available to stream anytime on 7plus.

== Presenters ==
- Belinda Sloane
- Callum Hann
- Kelly Golding
- Briony Hume
- Andrew Hayes
- Ron Kandelaars
- Teresa Palmer
- Accordion Hans

== See also ==
- Sydney Weekender
- Melbourne Weekender
- Queensland Weekender
- WA Weekender
