= Eclipse Music TV =

- Also known as: All Phones Eclipse Music TV
- Genre: Music television
- Country of origin: Australia
- Original language: English
- No. of seasons: 9

Production
- Production locations: Sydney, New South Wales
- Running time: 60 minutes (inc. ads)(2005–2009); 30 minutes (inc. ads)(2010–2013)

Original release
- Network: Seven Network (2005–2009); GO! (2010–2013)
- Release: 2005 – 2013

Eclipse Music TV was an Australian music television show which was broadcast every Sunday from 12:30pm on GO!. The show was referred to as AllPhones Eclipse Music TV, after its major sponsor All Phones. The first series went to air on the Seven Network in 2005, Eclipse Music TV quickly became Australia's number one Saturday music chart show til 2007. Its final show on the Seven Network aired on 28 November 2009, before moving to GO! on 8 April 2010. The series ended in 2013.

== Programme format ==
Eclipse Music TV generally plays a top five countdown that consists of national and international video clips, requested by the viewers using SMS, as well as new releases and a classic clip. It also frequently has competitions such as mobile phones and DJ sets like Turntables as well as CD reviews, celebrity gossip and star interviews. While on the Seven Network, the show ran for 60 minutes, whereas on the Nine Network the run-time is shortened to a half-hour.

== Sports broadcasts ==
When on the Seven Network due to the programs timeslot, it quite often got preempted for sports coverage such as Australian Open Tennis, AFL Finals, Bathurst 1000 and the Melbourne Cup carnival. When this happened, Eclipse Music TV wasn't seen at any time that week.

== Relaunch ==
Eclipse Music TV moved to GO! on 8 April 2010. The half-hour show aired every Sunday from 12:30pm, and then replayed on the Nine Network at Wednesdays at midnight, WIN/NBN Thursdays 12.30am, and again on Go! on Thursdays at midnight.

== Presenters ==
The presenters on the Seven Network have included:

- Lizzy Lovette (2005–2007)
- Jesse Tobin (2005–2009)

The presenters on GO! include:

- Suze Raymond (2010)
- Shura Taft (2011)
- Zoe Balbi (2011–2013)
- James Kerley (2012–2013)

== Compilations ==
- Ultimate Hits 07 CD
- Ultimate Hits '08 CD

== Guest presenters ==
Over time special guest and fill-in presenters have included:

- The Veronicas (2006)
- Delta Goodrem (2007)
- Vanessa Amorosi (2007)
- Mandy Moore (2007)
- Newton Faulkner (2007, 2008)
- Michael Paynter (2008, 2010)
- Kaz James (2008)
- KT Tunstall (2008)
- Guy Sebastian (2009)
- Cassie Davis (2008, 2009, 2010)
- Damien Leith (2010)
- Operator Please (2010)
- Stan Walker (2010)
- Miami Horror (2010)

== Themed specials ==
The shows themed specials have included so far

- Robbie Williams (2006)
- Ultimate Hits 07 (consisting of tracks from the Ultimate Hits 07 compilation CD) (2007)
- New music (2007)
- Ultimate Hits '08 (consisting of tracks from the Ultimate Hits '08 compilation CD) (2008)
- Summer Special (consisting of songs and music videos to do about summer) (2009)

== See also ==
- List of Australian music television shows
- List of Australian television series
