= The Great South East =

The Great South East is a Queensland-based lifestyle program screening on the Seven Network which screened from 1997 until 2016. It was replaced by a similarly themed show The Great Day Out in 2017.

The half-hour-long program showcases tourist attractions in the south-eastern corner of the state surrounding the state capital Brisbane.

The shows were produced by 7 Productions Queensland and screened on Sundays at 5:30pm. They often aired alongside similarly themed Queensland lifestyle programs Creek To Coast and Queensland Weekender.

In November 2019, the Seven Network announced The Great Day Out had been axed, with the final episodes screening in early 2020.

It was hosted by Sofie Formica from 2004 to 2017 and had several reporters including Laurel Edwards.
