= Creek to Coast =

Creek to Coast is a Queensland-based lifestyle program screening on the Seven Network on Saturdays at 5:30pm. The show is produced by 7 Productions Queensland.

Each week a number of segments are presented on topics such as camping, boating, fishing, four wheel driving, water sports and other outdoor and adventure attractions around Australia. The show celebrated its 20th birthday in 2019

Hosted by fishing personality, Scotty Hillier, Creek to Coast has a raft of presenters, all professionals in their own fields.

In November 2019, the Seven Network announced the show had been axed. However, after community outcry, the show was reinstated as well as a refreshed show combining Queensland Weekender and The Great Day Out, now known as WEEKENDER.
