= Sydney Weekender =

Australian television series

- Presented by: Sam Mac
- Country of origin: Australia
- Original language: English
- No. of seasons: 28
- No. of episodes: 1000+

Production
- Executive producer: Alan Dungey
- Production locations: Sydney, New South Wales
- Running time: Approx 30 minutes (including commercials)

Original release
- Network: Seven Network
- Release: 1994

Sydney Weekender is an Australian travel show featuring destinations throughout the state of New South Wales. The program debuted in 1994 on Saturdays at 5:30pm, later moving to Sundays at the same time before the local nightly news bulletin. It is hosted by Sam Mac and airs on the Seven Network in New South Wales and nationally on 7two.

The program visits various locations in the state highlighting activities, attractions, and dining options.

Sydney Weekender reached a milestone of 750 episodes on 18 August 2012. The series has spawned spin-offs including Melbourne Weekender.

Many of the locations featured in the program have a commercial arrangement whereby they have bought advertisements or paid to be featured in an episode. In November 2019, the Seven Network announced the show had been axed with the final episodes screening in early 2020. However, a number of travel shows axed by Seven including Sydney Weekender, were thrown a lifeline after a backlash to cost-cutting plans and sponsors.

Sydney Weekender has since returned for a full series, since 2021, exploring attractions, experiences and destinations across New South Wales. All episodes are available to stream anytime on 7plus.

In January 2022, Seven Network announced that Matt Shirvington would join as a host, replacing the long running host Mike Whitney. The final episode with Witney premiered on 30 January 2022, episodes with Shirvington premiering on 6 February 2022.

In January 2023, Seven Network announced that Sam Mac would replace Shirvington as host of the show. Shirvington will concentrate on his growing Seven News and Seven Sport commitments.

== Presenters ==
- Candice Dixon
- Daniel Gibson
- Darren Coggan
- Felicity Urquhart
- Erica Davis
- James Tobin
- Jack Yabsley
- Karen Ledbury
- Lizzy Lovette
- Luke Carroll
- Matt Baseley
- Mel Symons
- Peter Wells
- Sam Mac (host)
- Sally Stanton
- Sophie Falkiner
- Teigan Nash

=== Past presenters ===
- Cameron Williams (original host 1994)
- Ada Nicodemou
- Nuala Hafner
- Tim Campbell
- Sally Obermeder
- Greg Page
- PJ Lane
- Melissa Doyle
- Sonia Kruger
- Johanna Griggs
- Mark Beretta
- Georgie Gardner
- Sophie Falkiner
- Amber Sherlock
- Andrew Ettingshausen
- Monique Wright
- Rahni Sadler
- Ann Sanders
- Leigh Hatcher
- Kylie Gillies
- Rose Jacobs
- Jason Stevens
- Rebecca Stevens
- Lea Wilson
- Matt Shirvington

== See also ==
- Queensland Weekender
- WA Weekender
- SA Weekender
