= 1986 in American television =

In 1986, television in the United States saw a number of significant events, including the debuts, finales, and cancellations of television shows; the launch, closure, and rebranding of channels; changes and additions to network affiliations by stations; controversies, business transactions, and carriage disputes; and the deaths of individuals who had made notable contributions to the medium.

== Events ==
Date	Event
January 6	A Vicks Formula 44 cough medicine advertisement premieres, featuring Peter Bergman from All My Children, in which he told the viewing audience "I'm not a doctor, but I play one on TV". This phrase, first used during the early 1970s by actor Robert Young of the series Marcus Welby, M.D., was subsequently parodied by many popular culture references.
January 6	A revival of Card Sharks premieres on CBS. In order to make room for the show (which aired at 10:30 AM), CBS moves Press Your Luck to the 4:00 PM timeslot.
January 17	Dana Plato makes her final appearance as Kimberly Drummond on ABC's Diff'rent Strokes.
January 18	On NBC's Saturday Night Live, The Replacements perform "Bastards of Young" and "Kiss Me On the Bus", both from the Tim album. The entire band was drunk during both their performances. As one reviewer succinctly observed, the band could quite often be "mouthing profanities into the camera, stumbling into each other, falling down, dropping their instruments, and generally behaving like the apathetic drunks they were." After this incident, they were banned permanently from SNL, although lead singer Paul Westerberg would return as a solo musical guest during the 19th season.
January 24	Drake Hogestyn makes his first appearance as John Black on Days of Our Lives. First known as the Pawn (and played successively by two different actors), Hogestyn's character was then revealed to be Roman Brady after plastic surgery and amnesia some months later. He was then retconned when Wayne Northrop (Roman's original portrayer) returned in 1991. Hogestyn continued to play John Black (expect during a brief period from January 2009 to September 2011) until his death in September 2024, with his character being killed off in June 2025.
January 25	HBO begins scrambling its signal.
January 26	NBC's pregame coverage for Super Bowl XX includes what became known as "the silent minute"; a 60-second countdown over a black screen (a concept devised by then-NBC Sports executive Michael Weisman). Also featured was an interview by NBC Nightly News anchor Tom Brokaw of United States President Ronald Reagan at the White House (this would not become a regular Super Bowl pregame feature until Super Bowl XLIII, when Today show host Matt Lauer interviewed U.S. President Barack Obama).
January 28	NASA's Space Shuttle Challenger spacecraft disintegrates. CNN is the only news service to broadcast the disaster nationally.
January 28	The premiere episode of Melba, a vehicle for singer/actress Melba Moore, ranks as one of the lowest-rated programs of the week. CBS immediately pulled the show from its schedule. The remaining episodes were later aired during the summer.
February 9	Helen Martin joins the cast of the NBC comedy 227, after appearing on every episode in the 1985–86 season. Martin replaces Kia Goodwin (who was dismissed from the cast after the first season), who portrayed Rose's (Alaina Reed) daughter, Tiffany, before written off the show initially during 1988.
February 11	Culture Club's main singer Boy George appears on an episode of the NBC drama The A-Team.
February 14	Frank Zappa appears on an episode of the NBC drama Miami Vice. Zappa plays a crime boss named "Mr. Frankie" in the episode "Payback".
February 17	Rod Roddy becomes the permanent announcer of the CBS daytime game series The Price Is Right, replacing Johnny Olson, who had died the previous October.
February 22	In honor of the 20th anniversary of the first episode of the television series The Monkees, MTV broadcasts "Pleasant Valley Sunday", a 22-hour marathon of Monkees episodes.
March 1	Bay Area TV station KEMO-TV changes its call sign to KOFY-TV.
March 3	The made-for-TV movie Diary of a Perfect Murder airs on NBC. This pilot episode serves as the basis for Matlock, which premieres September 23.
March 6–12	A female contestant named Barbara Lowe appears on the game show Jeopardy! winning 5 games with approximately $50,000 in cash winnings. She was later found ineligible after it was revealed that Barbara appeared on about seven different game shows (most notably Bullseye, which was already off the air by the time of Jeopardy! current syndicated run) under four different aliases with as many Social Security numbers. Her winnings were originally withheld until Barbara sued the show's distributors Merv Griffin Enterprises and King World Productions. She ended up receiving her winnings, and was subsequently banned from the 1986 Jeopardy! Tournament of Champions and any future tournaments on the show.
March 7	WNEW-TV, TV station in New York changes its call sign to WNYW, in anticipation of its switch to Fox on October.
March 7	Dallas/Fort Worth independent television station KRLD-TV changes its calls to KDAF in anticipation of its switch to Fox in October.
March 9	On the NBC soap opera Search for Tomorrow, the entire town of Henderson is washed away in a flood. Main character Joanne Tourneur's motel is the only structure in town left standing.
March 9	Punky Brewster broadcasts a "very special episode" concerning Punky's reaction to the real life Space Shuttle Challenger Disaster. This would be the final episode of Punky Brewster to be broadcast on NBC. Its final two seasons would be produced for the first-run syndication market.
March 15	On the Saturday Night Live sketch "Mr. Monopoly", cast member Damon Wayans plays a minor police officer character role as a gay stereotype, which would later result in his firing. In the season finale however, executive producer Lorne Michaels invited Wayans back to perform stand up on the show, even though he had been fired by Michaels from the show two months prior.
March 20	After four seasons, NBC cancels Remington Steele. This announcement results in Pierce Brosnan being named the newest portrayer of James Bond. As a result of the media frenzy concerning Brosnan's appointment, as well as the corresponding increase of Steele's ratings, NBC reverses its decision and announces Steele will return midway through the 1986–87 season. This results in Bond movie producers withdrawing their offer to Brosnan, though he would take on the role of Bond in 1995.
March 24	MTV beings their annual Spring break coverage.
April 3	Merv Griffin sells his company, Merv Griffin Enterprises, to The Coca-Cola Company for $250,000,000.
April 5	The sitcom Too Close for Comfort is revamped under the new title, The Ted Knight Show. Production for the series is however, halted following star Ted Knight's death from colon cancer on August 26, 1986. Ten of the remaining episodes that were produced would eventually air from September 27, 1986, to February 7, 1987. Rebroadcasts of the single season of The Ted Knight Show would ultimately air under the Too Close for Comfort title.
April 7	The second annual WrestleMania event is broadcast on pay-per-view. It's the only WrestleMania that is not held on the traditional Sunday until the two-night WrestleMania 36 in April 2020. It's also to date, the only WrestleMania to take place at three separate venues: the Nassau Veterans Memorial Coliseum in Uniondale, New York; the Rosemont Horizon in Rosemont, Illinois; and the Los Angeles Memorial Sports Arena in Los Angeles, California.
April 13	NBC broadcasts Return to Mayberry, which reunites sixteen original cast members from The Andy Griffith Show. Return to Mayberry would become the highest-rated television film of 1986.
April 19	The series finale of Benson is broadcast on ABC. In the finale, the term-limited Governor Gatling runs for re-election as an independent candidate with Benson securing the party nomination, setting the stage for the two to go head-to-head in the general election. Benson and Gatling—who had strained relations due to the race—make peace with each other and watch the tight election returns together on television. As the broadcaster begins to announce that a winner is at last being projected, the episode ends on a freeze frame of Benson and Gatling, leaving the series with an unresolved cliffhanger.
April 20	Like the previous films, a separate extended edition for Superman III was produced and aired on ABC. The opening credits were in outer space, featuring the main Superman theme with slight differences. This is followed by a number of scenes, including additional dialogue but not added into any of the official VHS, DVD or Blu-ray cuts of the film. The "Deluxe Edition" of Superman III, released in 2006 on par with the DVD release of Superman Returns, included these scenes in its extra features section as "deleted scenes".
April 21	Geraldo Rivera hosts a live two-hour syndicated special The Mystery of Al Capone's Vaults, eventually coming up empty-handed.
April 27	A man calling himself Captain Midnight jams HBO's signal to protest its monthly fee of $12.95.
May 4–5	NBC broadcasts the two-part miniseries The Deliberate Stranger, starring Mark Harmon as real life serial killer Ted Bundy. During the second part's broadcast, a few NBC affiliates (including WPXI channel 11 Pittsburgh, Pennsylvania and KPRC channel 2 Houston, Texas) were interrupted by a frozen scene and a static sound until placing their own technical difficulties tel-op graphics for less than 30 seconds before returning to its fixed program.
May 10	Tommy Lee of the rock group Mötley Crüe marries actress Heather Locklear.
May 12	NBC unveils its new six-feathered Peacock logo during its 60th anniversary special. It is still used by the network today.
May 16	Bobby Ewing is revealed to be alive and showering in his ex-wife Pam's bathroom in the season finale of the CBS drama Dallas; in the September 26 season premiere, it was shown that the entire 1985–86 season was a dream of hers the night after they agreed to remarry.
May 16–24	The Stanley Cup Final between the Calgary Flames and Montreal Canadiens is broadcast in the United States on ESPN. This is the first of three consecutive seasons that ESPN would televise the Stanley Cup Final before being succeeded by SportsChannel America in 1989.
May 22	Cher calls David Letterman an "asshole" during a taping of NBC's Late Night with David Letterman.
May 26–June 8	The NBA Finals between the Boston Celtics and Houston Rockets is broadcast on CBS. This is notably, the first time the "NBA Finals" branding is officially used, as the "NBA World Championship Series" branding, which had been in use since the beginning of the National Basketball Association, is dropped.
May 31	ABC airs the Indianapolis 500 live for the first time.
June 1	CBS affiliate WCHS-TV in Charleston, West Virginia swaps affiliations with ABC affiliate WOWK-TV, reversing a swap that took place in 1962.
June 9	General Electric completes its acquisition of RCA, owner of NBC at that time, this made Denver's KCNC-TV an NBC owned and operated station.
June 18	St. Louis' CBS affiliate KMOX-TV was changed to KMOV-TV after being bought out by Viacom.
June 29	CBS affiliate WOWT-TV and NBC affiliate KMTV, both in Omaha, Nebraska, agree to swap affiliations, thus reversing a swap that took place in 1956.
July 4	CBS' Washington affiliate WDVM-TV changes its call letters to WUSA. In return, the NBC affiliate in Minneapolis/St. Paul already changed its call letters to KARE on June 11.
July 5	The opening ceremonies for the first annual Goodwill Games, an international multi-sport event created by Ted Turner in response to the Olympic boycotts of the period, is broadcast on TBS.
July 15	The Major League Baseball All-Star Game, emanating from the Astrodome in Houston, Texas is broadcast on ABC. The American League would defeat the National League by the score of 3–2. This would also turn out to be the final baseball game to be managed by Dick Howser of the American League team and Kansas City Royals. Broadcasters noticed that Howser was messing up signals when he changed pitchers, and Howser later admitted he that felt sick before the game. Shortly thereafter, Howser was diagnosed with a brain tumor and underwent surgery. On June 17, 1987, Dick Howser died at the age of 51.
July 18	A tornado is broadcast live by NBC affiliate KARE in Minneapolis when the station's helicopter pilot makes a chance encounter.
September 1	For one week, CBS Evening News anchorman Dan Rather attempts to initiate the use of the word "Courage" as a slogan. The attempt is a failure, and is noticed by other members of the press.
September 1	Disney Channel, at the time a premium cable network, begins broadcasting a 24-hour-a-day schedule.
September 8	Oprah Winfrey's Chicago-based talk show goes national.
September 8	Al Michaels makes his debut as the new play-by-play announcer for Monday Night Football. Michaels succeeds Frank Gifford, who was transferred to a color commentating role. Michaels would remain as the play-by-play announcer for Monday Night Football until the end of the 2005 season, when ABC terminated their broadcasting relationship with the National Football League.
September 8	The second season of the Leave It to Beaver sequel series, Still the Beaver airs on TBS. Originally broadcast on The Disney Channel, the series, now titled The New Leave It to Beaver, will air on TBS for three seasons, finally concluding in 1989.
September 17	ABC becomes the second American network to discontinue use of chime intonations at the beginning of telecasts, switching to satellite feed activation.
September 20	The pilot episode for what would become Lucille Ball's final television series, Life with Lucy, airs on ABC. Only 8 out of the 13 episodes produced were aired before ABC cancelled the series. Unlike Ball's previous sitcoms, Life with Lucy was a failure in the ratings and poorly received by critics and viewers alike, ranking among the worst sitcoms in broadcasting history.
September 20	The film-review program Siskel & Ebert & the Movies makes its debut in syndication. Although the two critics have been working as a pair since 1975, this will be their longest running program and will run in various incarnations until 2010.
September 27	On the NBC comedy The Facts of Life, Charlotte Rae quits the role of Mrs. Garrett (who marries her old friend Bruce Gaines, played by Robert Mandan), and is replaced by Cloris Leachman, who played Beverly Ann Stickle, Mrs. Garrett's sister.
September 27	Mama's Family begins its third season now in first-run syndication after spending its first two seasons on NBC.
September 27	Sheryl Lee Ralph joins the cast of the sitcom It's a Living as Ginger St. James. Ralph replaces Ann Jillian, who portrayed Cassie Cranston and departed after three seasons (the first two on ABC and the third in first-run syndication). Ralph would remain on It's a Living until its conclusion in 1989.
September 28	CBS returns the 4:00 p.m. timeslot to its affiliates following the cancellation of Press Your Luck a month earlier.
September 28	ABC airs the broadcast network television premiere of Raiders of the Lost Ark.
October 4	While walking to his New York City home, CBS Evening News anchor Dan Rather is accosted and beaten on the sidewalk by two men, who pummeled and kicked him while repeating the question "Kenneth, what is the frequency?"
October 5	ABC affiliate KDEB-TV in Springfield, Missouri disaffiliates from the network and becomes an independent station as a result of an agreement between ABC and Telepictures, owners of independent station KSPR. KDEB-TV will eventually become a charter affiliate of the Fox Broadcasting Company by March 1987.
October 6	The game show Double Dare premieres on Nickelodeon. Almost overnight, the show would make Nickelodeon (which by this time was struggling and only had a couple of hits, such as You Can't Do That on Television) the most watched cable channel. It would go on to be the channel's longest running game show (and the longest running series overall by episode count).
October 9	The Fox Broadcasting Company (then abbreviated as FBC; now Fox) launches as the United States' fourth commercial broadcast television network, the first such attempt since 1967. Its very first program is The Late Show Starring Joan Rivers.
October 11	Dana Carvey, Phil Hartman, Jan Hooks, Victoria Jackson, and Kevin Nealon officially join the cast of Saturday Night Live. The season opener features Madonna, who hosted of the previous season's opener, reading a "statement" from NBC about Season 11's writing and bad cast choices. According to the "statement", the entire 1985–86 season was "... all a dream. A horrible, horrible dream."
October 12	Fox signs its first affiliate outside of its charter group, when WTUV in Utica, New York signs-on.
October 17	SIN broadcasts the final of the 9th National OTI-SIN Festival live from the Miami Convention Center in Miami.
October 25	NBC's broadcast of Game 6 of the World Series, in which the New York Mets came from behind to defeat the Boston Red Sox in ten innings, causes the first cancellation of Saturday Night Live in its eleven-year history up until that point. That night's episode, which was hosted by Rosanna Arquette with musical guest Ric Ocasek, actually filmed starting at 1:30 AM EST. Instead, it aired two weeks later on November 8 with an introduction by Mets pitcher Ron Darling, who playfully apologized for the cancellation.
October 31	As a Halloween special, WPIX in New York City airs the uncut Invasion of the Body Snatchers, followed by an uncut episode of The Twilight Zone.
November 3	New episodes of Kids Incorporated began airing on The Disney Channel. The series had originally aired for two seasons in first–syndication. Disney's buyout package also includes the entire syndicated run, and as Disney Channel has never carried traditional commercial breaks, the episodes are re-edited to remove any advertising-related continuity to become continuous episodes.
November 9	A night for programs that could be described as anything but eventful. On ABC, a special celebrating the 15th birthday of Walt Disney World airs followed by the network television premiere of Splash. On NBC, Perry Mason: The Case of the Shooting Star is shown for the first time. While on CBS, part 1 of the miniseries Monte Carlo airs.
November 19–23	On CBS, Murder, She Wrote's Jessica Fletcher crosses over to Magnum, P.I. in a plot that sees her coming to Hawaii to investigate an attempt to murder Robin Masters' guests. She then tries to clear Thomas Magnum when he's accused of killing the hitman.
November 30	The Disney Channel signs off for the last time. From 7 a.m. on December 1, 1986, the channel broadcasts 24 hours a day.
December 16	Singer Darlene Love performs "Christmas (Baby Please Come Home)" for the first time on NBC's Late Night with David Letterman. Love would go on to sing the song annually from 1994 to 2014 on David Letterman's succeeding program, CBS' Late Show with David Letterman on the episode before Christmas. The only exception would be 2007, when Love was unable to perform due a Writers' Strike. So a repeat of her 2006 performance was shown instead.
December 20	NBC's Saturday Night Live features a sketch where William Shatner, sick of Star Trek fans asking him inane questions, tells them to "Get a life!"
December 25	Liberace makes what turns out to be his last public appearance on a prerecorded interview with Oprah Winfrey.

== Programs ==
=== Debuting this year ===
Date	Title	Network
January 5	Blacke's Magic	NBC
January 6	Bruce Forsyth's Hot Streak	ABC
January 10	He's the Mayor	ABC
January 18	The Redd Foxx Show	ABC
January 22	Planet Earth	PBS
January 26	The Last Precinct	NBC
January 28	Melba	CBS
February 15	Fortune Dane	ABC
February 16	Sidekicks	ABC
February 24	You Again?	NBC
March 1	Valerie	NBC
March 3	Matlock	NBC
March 5	Fast Times	CBS
March 5	Tough Cookies	CBS
March 20	All Is Forgiven	NBC
March 25	Morningstar/Eveningstar	CBS
March 25	Perfect Strangers	ABC
March 28	Mr. Sunshine	ABC
April 6	Fathers and Sons	NBC
April 13	The Wind in the Willows	The Disney Channel
April 24	Bridges to Cross	CBS
April 25	Leo & Liz in Beverly Hills	CBS
June 21	The Canned Film Festival	Syndication
June 21	Me & Mrs. C	NBC
June 30	The Mysterious Cities of Gold	Nickelodeon
July 28	A Current Affair	Syndication
September 6	WWF Superstars of Wrestling	Syndication
September 6	The Flintstone Kids	ABC
September 8	Ghostbusters	Syndication
September 8	Nightlife	Syndication
September 8	The Oprah Winfrey Show	Syndication
September 8	SilverHawks	Syndication
September 8	Superior Court	Syndication
September 9	The Wizard	CBS
September 10	It's Garry Shandling's Show	Showtime
September 11	Our House	NBC
September 13	Easy Street	NBC
September 13	Kissyfur	NBC
September 13	The Real Ghostbusters	ABC
September 13	Pound Puppies	ABC
September 13	Pee-wee's Playhouse	CBS
September 13	Teen Wolf	CBS
September 13	Wildfire	CBS
September 13	At the Movies	Syndication
September 14	The New Adventures of Jonny Quest	Syndication
September 15	Rambo: The Force of Freedom	Syndication
September 15	Zoobilee Zoo	Syndication
September 16	Jack and Mike	ABC
September 17	Head of the Class	ABC
September 18	Crime Story	NBC
September 18	L.A. Law	NBC
September 19	Starman	ABC
September 20	The Ellen Burstyn Show	ABC
September 20	Heart of the City	ABC
September 20	Life With Lucy	ABC
September 22	Dennis the Menace	Syndication
September 22	Zoobilee Zoo	Syndication
September 22	Together We Stand	CBS
September 22	ALF	NBC
September 23	Sledge Hammer!	ABC
September 25	Our World	ABC
September 26	Kay O'Brien	CBS
September 27	The New Mike Hammer	CBS
September 27	Amen	NBC
September 28	WWF Wrestling Challenge	Syndication
September 29	Designing Women	CBS
October 1	Better Days	CBS
October 6	My Sister Sam	CBS
October 6	Double Dare	Nickelodeon
October 9	The Late Show	Fox
December 1	The Cavanaughs	CBS
December 5	Dads	ABC
December 5	Gung Ho	ABC
December 28	Outlaws	CBS

=== Resuming this year ===
Title	Final Aired	Previous Network	New title	Returning Network	Date of return
Card Sharks	1981	NBC	Same	CBS	January 6
Too Close for Comfort	1985	Syndication	The Ted Knight Show	Same	April 21
9 to 5	1983	ABC	Same	Syndication	September 13
Hollywood Squares	1984	NBC	Same	Syndication	September 15
Mama's Family	1984	NBC	Same	Syndication	September 26

=== Ending this year ===
Date	Title	Debut
January 3	Body Language	1984
January 7	Stir Crazy	1985
January 16	Shadow Chasers	1985
January 25	Lady Blue	1985
February 1	Inspector Gadget (returned in 2015)	1983
February 6	Ripley's Believe It or Not! (returned in 2000)	1982
February 21	Misfits of Science	1985
March 5	Planet Earth	1986
March 7	Diff'rent Strokes	1978
April 4	Bruce Forsyth's Hot Streak	1986
April 8	Foley Square	1985
April 8	Mary	1985
April 19	Benson	1979
April 19	The Redd Foxx Show	1986
April 23	Fast Times	1986
April 27	Jayce and the Wheeled Warriors	1985
May 2	The Fall Guy	1981
May 3	Crazy Like a Fox	1984
May 5	Hardcastle and McCormick	1983
May 7	Blacke's Magic	1986
May 16	Charlie & Co.	1985
May 23	The Joker's Wild (returned in 1990)	1972
May 23	The All-New Let's Make a Deal (returned in 1991)	1963
May 23	Tic Tac Dough (returned in 1990)	1956
May 24	The Love Boat	1977
May 24	Mr. Sunshine	1986
May 28	T. J. Hooker	1982
June 6	The Merv Griffin Show	1972
June 7	Star Wars: Droids	1985
August 8	Knight Rider	1982
August 9	The Paper Chase	1978
August 22	Riptide	1984
August 24	Code of Vengeance	1985
September 4	Trapper John, M.D.	1979
September 5	Price Is Right (nighttime) (returned in 1994)	1972
September 26	Press Your Luck (returned in 2019)	1983
October 22	Better Days	1986
November 15	Life with Lucy	1986
November 20	Kay O'Brien	1986
December 5	Ghostbusters	1986
December 5	SilverHawks	1986
December 6	It's Punky Brewster	1985
December 13	Ewoks	1985
December 13	Wildfire	1986
December 26	The Canned Film Festival	1986
December 26	Rambo: The Force of Freedom	1986
December 26	Search for Tomorrow	1951

=== Changing networks ===
Show	Moved from	Moved to
National Geographic Explorer	Nickelodeon	TBS
The New Leave It to Beaver	Disney Channel	TBS
The Wonderful World of Disney	CBS	ABC
The Care Bears	Syndication	ABC
Pink Panther and Sons	NBC	ABC
Card Sharks	NBC	CBS
Hollywood Squares	NBC	Syndication
Mama's Family	NBC	Syndication
Silver Spoons	NBC	Syndication
9 to 5	ABC	Syndication

=== Made-for-TV movies and miniseries ===
Title	Channel	Premiere date
The Last Frontier (miniseries)	CBS	November 3
North and South: Book II (miniseries)	ABC	May 4

== Networks and services ==
=== Launches ===
Network	Type	Launch date	Notes	Source
Festival	Cable television	April 1		
C-SPAN2	Cable television	June 2		
QVC	Cable television	November 24		

=== Conversions and rebrandings ===
Old network name	New network name	Type	Conversion Date	Notes	Source
National Christian Network	Liberty Broadcasting Network	Cable television	Unknown		
Satellite Program Network	Tempo Television	Cable television	March 8		

=== Closures ===
There are no closures for cable and satellite television channels in this year.

== Television stations ==
=== Station launches ===
Date	City of License/Market	Station	Channel	Affiliation	Notes/Ref.
January 1	Quincy, Illinois	WTJR	!6	CTN	
January 8	Columbus, Ohio	W17AI	17	Independent	
January 10	Mansfield, Ohio	WMFD-TV	68	Independent	
January 27	Houston, Texas	KTHT	67	Independent	
January 30	Pensacola, Florida/Mobile, Alabama	WHBR	33	CTN	
January 31	Birmingham, Alabama	WCAJ	68	Independent	
February 7	Hot Springs, Arkansas	KRZB-TV	26	Independent	
February 15	Syracuse, New York	WKAF	68	Independent	
February 19	Urbana, Illinois	WCCU	27	Independent	Satellite of WRSP-TV/Springfield
March 6	Rockford, Illinois	W68BR	68		
March 7	Olean/Buffalo, New York	W20AB	20	ACTS/TempoTV	
March 10	Roanoke/Lynchburg, Virginia	WVFT	27	Independent	
March 17	Lufkin, Texas	KHTM-LP	13	Independent	
March 23	Lynchburg, Virginia	WJPR	21	Independent	
March 24	Honolulu, Hawaii	KBFD	32	Asian independent	
March 24	Odessa/Midland, Texas	KOCV-TV	36	PBS	
March 30	Jefferson City/Columbia, Missouri	KNLJ	25	Religious independent	
April 2	Louisville, Kentucky	WBNA	21	Independent	
April 7	West Monroe/Monroe, Louisiana (El Dorado, Arkansas)	KMCT-TV	39	Religious independent	
April 6	Omaha, Nebraska	KPTM	42	Independent	
April 13	Stockton, California; Sacramento/Modesto, California)	KSCH-TV	58	Independent	
April 16	Rawlins, Wyoming	KRWY	9	ABC	
April 19	Florence, Alabama	WTRT	26	Independent	
April 24	Lakeland/Tampa, Florida	WTMV	32	Independent	
April 25	San Francisco, California	K30BI	30	The Box	
April 27	Mayaguez, Puerto Rico	WUHM-TV	22	Independent	Satellite of WAPA-TV/San Juan
April 29	Harrisburg, Pennsylvania	W35BT	35	Cornerstone Television	
June 1	Joplin, Missouri	KOZJ	26	PBS	Satellite of KOZK/Springfield
June 2	Ottumwa, Iowa (Kirksville, Missouri)	KOIA-TV	15	Independent	
June 8	Madison, Wisconsin	WMSN-TV	47	Independent	
June 14	Hartford, Connecticut	W13BF	13	Netspan	
June 16	Odessa/Midland, Texas	KPEJ-TV	24	Independent	
June 17	Beaumont, Texas	KITU-TV	34	TBN	
June 17	Little Rock, Arkansas	KJTM-TV	38	Independent	
June 25	Nashville, Tennessee	W61AR	61	Independent (primary); America One (secondary)	
July 1	Charleston, Illinois	WEIU-TV	51	Independent	
July 9	Wilmington, Delaware (Philadelphia, Pennsylvania)	WTGI-TV	61	Independent (primary); ABC (secondary)	Clearednetwork programs not cleared by WPVI-TV until 1988.
July 22	Gadsden/Anniston, Alabama (Birmingham/Tuscaloosa, Alabama)	WTJP-TV	60	TBN	
August 12	Nashville, Tennessee	W24AE	24	HSN	
August 15	Aguadilla, Puerto Rico	WELU	32	Religious independent	
August 20	Iron Mountain/Marquette, Michigan	WDHS	8	TBN	
August 23	Honolulu, Hawaii	KWHE	14	Independent	
August 28	Naranjito, Puerto Rico	WECN	64	Religious independent	
August 29	Oklahoma City, Oklahoma	K07TX	7	Independent	
September 1	Monterey/Santa Cruz, California	KSMS	67	SIN	
September 2	Erie, Pennsylvania	WETG	66	Independent	
September 12	Indianapolis, Indiana	W31AL	31	EWTN	
September 14	Portland, Maine	WPXT	51	Independent	
September 15	New London/Hartford, Connecticut	WTWS	26	Independent	
September 19	Pembina, North Dakota (Emerson/Winnipeg, Manitoba, Canada)	KNRR	12	Independent	Satellite of KVRR/Fargo
September 21	Great Falls, Montana	KTGF	16	NBC	
September 25	Garland/Dallas/Fort Worth, Texas	KIAB-TV	23	SIN (primary); CTN/HSN (secondary)	
September 25	Detroit, Michigan	W26AB	26	America One (primary); FamilyNet (secondary)	
September 28	La Crosse, Wisconsin	WQOW	18	ABC	
October 7	St. Joseph, Missouri	KTAJ-TV	16	TBN	
October 8	Reno, Nevada	KREN-TV	27	SIN	
October 12	Utica, New York	WTUV	33	Fox	
October 13	Johnstown/Altoona, Pennsylvania	WWCP-TV	8	Independent	
October 16	Roanoke Rapids, North Carolina	WUNP-TV	36	PBS	Part of University of North Carolina Public Television
October 21	Clarksville, Indiana (Louisville, Kentucky)	W05BA	5	TBN	
October 25	Bend, Oregon	K48BL	48	America One	
November 2	Visalia/Fresno, California	KNXT	49	Religious independent	
November 14	Portsmouth, Ohio	K21BK	21	Independent	
November 15	San Jose, California (San Francisco/Oakland, California)	KLXV-TV	65	TBN	
November 25	Vallejo, California (San Francisco/Oakland/San Jose, California)	KPST-TV	66	Asian independent	
December 1	Salt Lake City, Utah	KUEN	9	Educational independent	
December 5	Fort Wayne, Indiana	WFWA	39	PBS	
December 6	Norwell/Boston, Massachusetts	WRYT	46	Independent	
December 12	La Salle/Chicago, Illinois	WWTO-TV	35	TBN	
Unknown date	Christiansted, U.S. Virgin Islands	WTTM-TV	27	Independent	

=== Network affiliation changes ===
Date	City of License/Market	Station	Channel	Old affiliation	New affiliation	Notes/Ref.
January 1	Columbia, Missouri	KMIZ	17	NBC	ABC	
January 1	Columbia, Missouri	KOMU-TV	8	ABC	NBC	
June 1	CharlestonHuntington, West Virginia	WCHS-TV	8	CBS	ABC	
June 1	Huntington/Charleston, West Virginia	WOWK-TV	13	ABC	CBS	
June 29	Omaha, Nebraska	KMTV-TV	3	NBC	CBS	
June 29	Omaha, Nebraska	WOWT	6	CBS	NBC	
October 9	Albany, New York	WXXA-TV	23	Independent	Fox	
October 9	Albuquerque, New Mexico	KGSW	14	Independent	Fox	
October 9	Amarillo, Texas	KCIT	14	Independent	Fox	
October 9	Anchorage, Alaska	KTBY	4	Independent	Fox	
October 9	Anderson, South Carolina (Greenville/Spartanburg, South Carolina and Asheville, North Carolina)	WAXA-TV	40	Independent	Fox	
October 9	Appleton/Green Bay, Wisconsin	WXGZ-TV	32	Independent	Fox	
October 9	Atlanta, Georgia	WATL	36	Independent	Fox	
October 9	Augusta, Georgia	W67BE	67	Independent	Fox	
October 9	Austin, Texas	KBVO	42	Independent	Fox	
October 9	Baltimore, Maryland	WBFF	45	Independent (primary); ABC/CBS (secondary)	Fox	Previously cleared programs not cleared by WMAR-TV (later WBAL-TV) and WJZ-TV
October 9	Bessemer, Alabama (Birmingham/Tuscaloosa/Anniston)	WDBB	17	Independent	Fox	
October 9	Boise, Idaho	KTRV-TV	12	Independent	Fox	
October 9	Charlotte, North Carolina	WCCB	18	Independent	Fox	
October 9	Champaign/Decatur/Springfield, Illinois	WRSP-TV	55	Independent	Fox	
October 9	Charleston, South Carolina	WTAT-TV	24	Independent	Fox	
October 9	Chattanooga, Tennessee	WDSI-TV	61	Independent	Fox	
October 9	Chicago, Illinois	WFLD	32	Independent	Fox	
October 9	Colorado Springs, Colorado	KXRM-TV	21	Independent	Fox	
October 9	Columbus, Ohio	WTTE	28	Independent	Fox	
October 9	Dallas/Fort Worth, Texas	KDAF	33	Independent	Fox	
October 9	Danville/Lexington, Kentucky	WDKY-TV	56	Independent	Fox	
October 9	Dayton, Ohio	WRGT-TV	45	Independent	Fox	
October 9	Des Moines, Iowa	KDSM-TV	17	Independent	Fox	
October 9	Detroit, Michigan	WKBD-TV	50	Independent	Fox	
October 9	El Paso, Texas	KCIK-TV	14	Independent	Fox	
October 9	Eugene, Oregon	K25AS	25	Independent	Fox	
October 9	Fargo, North Dakota	KVRR	15	Independent	Fox	
October 9	Flint/Saginaw, Michigan	WSMH	66	Independent	Fox	
October 9	Fort Myers, Florida	WFTX-TV	36	Independent	Fox	
October 9	Gadsden, Alabama (Birmingham/Tuscaloosa/Anniston)	WNAL	44	Independent	Fox	
October 9	Grand Rapids/Kalamazoo/Battle Creek, Michigan	WXMI	17	Independent	Fox	
October 9	Greensboro/Winston-Salem, North Carolina	WNRW-TV	45	Independent	Fox	
October 9	Harrisburg/Lebanon, Pennsylvania	WPMT	43	Independent	Fox	
October 9	Hartford, Connecticut	WTIC-TV	61	Independent (primary); CBS/ABC (secondary)	Fox	Previously cleared ABC or CBS programming not carried by WTNH or WFSB-TV, respectively.
October 9	Hazleton/Scranton/Wilkes-Barre, Pennsylvania	WOLF-TV	56	Independent	Fox	
October 9	Honolulu, Hawaii	KHNL	13	Independent	Fox	
October 9	Huntington/Charleston, West Virginia (Ashland, Kentucky/Portsmouth, Ohio)	WVAH-TV	23	Independent	Fox	
October 9	Indianapolis, Indiana	WXIN (recalled from WPDS-TV)	59	Independent	Fox	
October 9	Inglis/Yankeetown, Florida (Gainesville/Ocala)	W49AI	49	Independent	Fox	
October 9	Jacksonville, Florida	WAWS	30	Independent	Fox	
October 9	Kansas City, Missouri	KSHB-TV	41	Independent	Fox	
October 9	Kerrville/San Antonio, Texas	KRRT	35	Independent	Fox	
October 9	Lafayette, Louisiana	KADN	15	Independent	Fox	
October 9	Lake Charles, Louisiana	KVHP	29	Independent	Fox	
October 9	Las Vegas, Nevada	KVVU-TV	5	Independent	Fox	
October 9	Los Angeles, California	KTTV	11	Independent	Fox	
October 9	Louisville, Kentucky	WDRB	41	Independent	Fox	
October 9	Lubbock, Texas	KJTV-TV	36	Independent	Fox	
October 9	Lynchburg/Danville, Virginia	WJPR-TV	21	Independent	Fox	
October 9	Madison, Wisconsin	WMSN-TV	47	Independent	Fox	
October 9	Miami, Florida	WCIX-TV	6	Independent	Fox	
October 9	Milwaukee, Wisconsin	WCGV-TV	24	Independent	Fox	
October 9	Montgomery, Alabama	WCOV-TV	20	Independent	Fox	
October 9	Mobile, Alabama (Pensacola, Florida)	WPMI-TV	15	Independent	Fox	
October 9	Monterey/Salinas/Santa Cruz, California	KCBA	35	Independent	Fox	
October 9	Nashville, Tennessee	WCAY-TV	30	Independent	Fox	
October 9	Newport, Kentucky/Cincinnati, Ohio	WXIX-TV	19	Independent	Fox	
October 9	New York City	WNEW-TV	5	Independent	Fox	
October 9	Norfolk, Virginia (Newport News/Portsmouth/Virginia Beach)	WTVZ	33	Independent	Fox	
October 9	Oakland/San Francisco, California	KTVU	2	Independent	Fox	
October 9	Oklahoma City, Oklahoma	KAUT-TV	43	Independent	Fox	
October 9	Orlando, Florida	WOFL	35	Independent	Fox	
October 9	Ottumwa, Iowa/Kirksville, Missouri	KOIA-TV	15	Independent	Fox	
October 9	Peoria/Bloomington, Illinois	WYZZ-TV	43	Independent	Fox	
October 9	Pembina, North Dakota (USA) (Emerson/Winnipeg, Manitoba)	KNRR	12	Independent	Fox	Satellite of KVRR/Fargo
October 9	Philadelphia, Pennsylvania	WTXF-TV	29	Independent	Fox	
October 9	Phoenix, Arizona	KNXV-TV	15	Independent	Fox	
October 9	Pittsburgh, Pennsylvania	WPGH-TV	53	Independent (primary); CBS (secondary)	Fox	
October 9	Pine Bluff/Little Rock, Arkansas	KJTM-TV	38	Independent	Fox	
October 9	Portland, Maine	WPXT	51	Independent	Fox	
October 9	Providence, Rhode Island	WNAC-TV	64	Independent	Fox	
October 9	Raleigh/Durham, North Carolina	WLFL-TV	22	Independent	Fox	
October 9	Redding/Chico, California	KRCR-TV	7	ABC (exclusive)	Fox	ABC (primary); Fox (secondary)
October 9	Reno, Nevada	KAME-TV	21	Independent	Fox	Fox
October 9	Richmond, Virginia	WRLH-TV	35	Independent	Fox	Fox
October 9	Rochester, New York	WUHF	31	Independent	Fox	Fox
October 9	Sacramento, California	KTXL	40	Independent	Fox	Fox
October 9	Saipan, Northern Mariana Islands	WSZE-TV	10	NBC (primary); CBS/ABC (secondary)	NBC (primary); CBS/ABC/Fox (secondary)	Satellite of KUAM-TV/Hagåtña, Guam
October 9	San Angelo, Texas	KIDY	6	Independent	Fox	
October 9	Salt Lake City, Utah	KSTU	13	Independent	Fox	
October 9	Savannah, Georgia	WTGS	28	Independent	Fox	
October 9	Casper, Wyoming	KFNB	20	Independent	Fox	
October 9	Scranton/Wilkes-Barre, Pennsylvania	WOLF-TV	38	Independent	Fox	
October 9	Shaker Heights/Cleveland, Ohio	WOIO	19	Independent	Fox	
October 9	Shreveport, Louisiana	KMSS-TV	33	Independent (primary); CBS (secondary)	Fox	
October 9	Spokane, Washington	KAYU-TV	28	Independent	Fox	
October 9	Springfield, Missouri	KDEB-TV	27	Independent	Fox	
October 9	St. Louis, Missouri	KDNL	30	Independent	Fox	
October 9	Syracuse, New York	WSYT-TV	68	Independent	Fox	
October 9	Tacoma/Seattle, Washington	KCPQ	13	Independent (primary); CBS (secondary)	Fox	
October 9	Tampa, Florida	WTOG	44	Independent	Fox	
October 9	Thief River Falls, Minnesota (Grand Forks, North Dakota)	KBRR	10	Independent	Fox	Satellite of KVRR/Fargo
October 9	Tijuana, Baja California, Mexico (San Diego, California, United States)	XETV-TV	6	Independent	Fox	
October 9	Toledo, Ohio	WUPW	36	Independent	Fox	
October 9	Tulsa, Oklahoma	KOKI-TV	23	Independent	Fox	
October 9	Tucson, Arizona	KMSB	11	Independent	Fox	
October 9	Waco, Texas	KWKT-TV	44	Independent	Fox	
October 9	Washington, D.C.	WTTG	5	Independent	Fox	
October 9	Watertown, New York	WJCK	50	ABC (exclusive)	ABC (primary); Fox (secondary)	
October 9	Wichita, Kansas	KSAS-TV	24	Independent	Fox	
October 9	Wichita Falls, Texas	KJTL	18	Independent	Fox	
October 13	Altoona/Johnstown, Pennsylvania	WWPC-TV	23	ABC	Independent	

== Births ==
Date	Name	Notability
January 1	Anna Brewster	English actress (Versailles)
January 4	Charlyne Yi	Actress (House, Steven Universe, We Bare Bears, Summer Camp Island)
January 5	Jesse Draper	Actress (The Naked Brothers Band)
January 6	Shane Sweet	Actor (The Journey of Allen Strange, Married... with Children)
January 8	Jaclyn Linetsky	Canadian voice actress (Mega Babies, What's with Andy?, Caillou) (d. 2003)
January 15	Jessy Schram	Actress (Last Resort, Falling Skies, Nashville) and singer
January 15	Molly Orr	Actress (Drake & Josh)
January 18	Devin Kelley	Actress (The Chicago Code, Resurrection, Frequency)
January 18	Becca Tobin	Actress (Glee) and singer
January 21	Julianna Strickland	YouTube personality and actress
January 22	Daniel Wayne Smith	Actor (d. 2006)
January 24	Mischa Barton	Actress (KaBlam!, Once and Again, The O.C.)
January 24	Raviv Ullman	Actor (Phil of the Future, Rita Rocks)
January 29	Drew Tyler Bell	Actor (The Bold and the Beautiful)
January 30	Ashley Buccille	Voice actress (Lila Sawyer on Hey Arnold!)
February 1	Lauren Conrad	Actress (Laguna Beach: The Real Orange County, The Hills)
February 2	Gemma Arterton	English actress
February 4	Danielle Vega	American actress (Barney & Friends)
February 5	Elizabeth Alderfer	American actress
February 6	Alice Greczyn	Actress (Quintuplets, The Lying Game)
February 6	Dane DeHaan	Actor (In Treatment)
February 7	Stephen Colletti	Actor (Laguna Beach: The Real Orange County, One Tree Hill)
February 8	Anna Hutchison	New Zealand actress (Power Rangers Jungle Fury)
February 12	Valorie Curry	Actress
February 14	Tiffany Thornton	Actress (Sonny with a Chance, So Random!) and singer
February 15	Amber Riley	Actress (Glee)
February 19	Ophelia Lovibond	English actress (Holby City, Titanic: Blood and Steel, Elementary)
February 22	Miko Hughes	Actor (Full House, Life with Louie)
February 24	Bryce Papenbrook	Voice actor (Miraculous: Tales of Ladybug & Cat Noir, Sword Art Online, Attack on Titan)
February 25	Justin Berfield	Actor (Unhappily Ever After, Malcolm in the Middle, Kim Possible)
February 25	Jameela Jamil	Actress
February 26	Teresa Palmer	Australian actress
February 28	Kingsley Ben-Adir	British actor
March 1	Big E	Pro wrestler
March 2	Sonja Kinski	Actress
March 4	Margo Harshman	Actress (Even Stevens, Run of the House)
March 5	Dominique McElligott	Actress
March 9	Brittany Snow	Actress (American Dreams, Harry's Law)
March 10	Vadim Schneider	French-Canadian actor (d. 2003)
March 14	Jamie Bell	English actor (Turn: Washington's Spies)
March 16	Alexandra Daddario	Actress (All My Children, White Collar, Parenthood)
March 17	Olesya Rulin	Russian-born actress (High School Musical)
March 19	Michael Drayer	American actor
March 20	Ruby Rose	Australian actress (Orange is the New Black, Batwoman)
March 21	Scott Eastwood	Actor and son of Clint Eastwood
March 22	Matt Bush	Actor (Glory Daze, The Goldbergs)
March 23	Steven Strait	Actor
March 23	Ben Rappaport	Actor
March 26	Jessica Hart	Australian model
March 28	Lady Gaga	Singer, songwriter, and actress (American Horror Story)
March 28	Meagan Smith	Actress (Gwen Tennyson in Ben 10)
March 30	Tessa Ferrer	Actress (Grey's Anatomy)
March 30	Simon Baker	Actor
April 2	Drew Van Acker	Actor (Tower Prep, Pretty Little Liars)
April 2	Lee DeWyze	Singer (American Idol)
April 2	Christopher Walberg	Voice actor (Stinky Peterson on Hey Arnold!)
April 3	Amanda Bynes	Actress (All That, The Amanda Show, Rugrats, What I Like About You)
April 3	Jerry Messing	Actor
April 5	Charlotte Flair	Pro Wrestler (WWE)
April 6	Kay Adams	Sportscaster
April 7	Jason Ralph	Actor
April 9	Leighton Meester	Actress (Gossip Girl, Single Parents) and singer
April 9	Jordan Masterson	Actor (Greek, Last Man Standing)
April 12	Matt McGorry	Actor (Orange is the New Black, How to Get Away with Murder)
April 15	Ester Dean	Actress
April 16	Sufe Bradshaw	Actress (Veep)
April 22	Amber Heard	Actress (Hidden Palms)
April 25	John DeLuca	Actor (General Hospital)
April 25	Daniel Sharman	English actor (Teen Wolf, The Originals)
April 27	Jenna Coleman	English actress (Emmerdale, Doctor Who, Victoria)
April 28	Jenna Ushkowitz	Actress (Glee) and singer
April 29	Zoran Korach	Actor (Sam & Cat)
April 29	Crystal Hefner	Host
April 30	Dianna Agron	Actress (Glee), singer, and dancer
April 30	Beau Wirick	Actor
May 1	Abby Huntsman	TV host
May 2	Emily Hart	Actress (Sabrina the Teenage Witch, Sabrina: The Animated Series)
May 2	Thomas McDonell	Actor (The 100)
May 3	Poppy Delevingne	English model
May 6	Sasheer Zamata	Actress and comedian (Saturday Night Live)
May 8	Laura Spencer	Actress (The Lizzie Bennet Diaries, The Big Bang Theory)
May 9	Grace Gummer	Actress (Gigantic, American Horror Story, Extant) and daughter of Meryl Streep and Don Gummer
May 12	Emily VanCamp	Actress (Everwood, Brothers & Sisters, Revenge)
May 13	Lena Dunham	Actress (Girls)
May 16	Drew Roy	Actor (Hannah Montana, Falling Skies)
May 16	Jacob Zachar	Actor (Greek)
May 16	Megan Fox	Actress (Ocean Ave., Hope & Faith, New Girl) and model
May 17	Amy Gumenick	Swedish-born American actress (Arrow, Turn: Washington's Spies)
May 17	Tahj Mowry	Actor (Full House, Smart Guy, Baby Daddy, Kim Possible)
May 17	Erin Richards	Welsh actress (Gotham)
May 20	Louisa Krause	Actress
May 20	Kyle Harris	Actor
May 21	Da'Vine Joy Randolph	Actress
May 22	Molly Ephraim	Actress (Last Man Standing)
May 24	Mark Ballas	Dancer and choreographer (Dancing with the Stars)
May 28	Seth Rollins	Pro wrestler
May 30	Will Peltz	Actor
June 3	Josh Segarra	Actor (Sirens, Arrow)
June 4	Oona Chaplin	Spanish actress (The Hour, Game of Thrones)
June 5	Amanda Crew	Canadian actress (Silicon Valley)
June 6	Leslie Carter	Singer (died 2012)
June 6	Justin Allgaier	Race car driver
June 6	Cameron Britton	Actor
June 10	Joey Zimmerman	Actor (Earth 2, Halloweentown)
June 11	Shia LaBeouf	Actor (Even Stevens)
June 13	Kat Dennings	Actress (Raising Dad, 2 Broke Girls)
June 13	Mary-Kate Olsen	Actresses (Full House, Two of a Kind, So Little Time)
June 13	Ashley Olsen	Actresses (Full House, Two of a Kind, So Little Time)
June 17	Marie Avgeropoulos	Actress (The 100)
June 18	Richard Madden	English actor (Game of Thrones)
June 18	Meaghan Rath	Canadian actress (15/Love, The Assistants, Being Human)
June 19	Erin Mackey	Actress (The Parent Trap)
June 20	Dreama Walker	Actress (Gossip Girl, Don't Trust the B— in Apartment 23)
June 24	Kaitlin Cullum	Actress (Grace Under Fire)
June 24	Solange Knowles	Singer, actress
June 27	Drake Bell	Actor (The Amanda Show, Drake & Josh, Ultimate Spider-Man, Ben 10)
June 27	Alex Plank	Actor
June 28	Shadia Simmons	Canadian actress
June 28	Maya Stojan	Actress
June 28	Matteo Lane	Comedian
June 28	Kellie Pickler	Singer
July 1	Casey Reinhardt	Actress (Laguna Beach: The Real Orange County)
July 2	Lindsay Lohan	Actress (4-time host of Saturday Night Live, Lindsay, Lindsay Lohan's Beach Club) and daughter of Michael Lohan and Dina Lohan
July 6	Leon Frierson	Actor (All That)
July 8	Jake McDorman	Actor (Quintuplets, Greek, Limitless)
July 9	Kiely Williams	Actress (The Cheetah Girls), singer
July 10	Wyatt Russell	Actor
July 15	Mishael Morgan	Actress (The Young and the Restless)
July 16	Laura Carmichael	English actress (Downton Abbey)
July 16	Taryn Southern	Actress (Sorority Forever), singer and YouTube personality
July 17	Brando Eaton	Actor (Dexter, Zoey 101, The Secret Life of the American Teenager)
July 17	Kaitlin Vilasuso	Actress
July 18	Travis Milne	Canadian actor (Rookie Blue)
July 20	Osric Chau	Canadian actor (Supernatural)
July 21	Diane Guerrero	Actress (Orange Is the New Black, Jane the Virgin, Superior Donuts, Doom Patrol)
July 21	Betty Gilpin	Actress
July 24	Megan Park	Actress (The Secret Life of the American Teenager, The Neighbors)
July 26	Monica Raymund	Actress (Lie to Me, The Good Wife, Chicago Fire)
July 28	Alexandra Chando	Actress (As the World Turns, The Lying Game)
July 28	Nolan Gerard Funk	Actor (Glee, Awkward)
July 29	Brandon Gilberstadt	Actor (100 Deeds for Eddie McDowd)
July 30	Danielle Keaton	Actress
August 3	Andrew McFarlane	Actor (My Wife and Kids)
August 8	Peyton List	Actress (As the World Turns, The Tomorrow People)
August 13	Ashley Spillers	Actress (Vice Principals, Rugrats)
August 16	Casey LaBow	Actress
August 16	Sarah Pavan	Canadian volleyball player
August 16	Shawn Pyfrom	Actor (Stanley, Desperate Housewives)
August 17	Bryton James	Actor (Family Matters, The Young and the Restless, Young Justice)
August 21	Kiami Davael	Actress
August 21	Brooks Wheelan	Actor and comedian (Saturday Night Live)
August 27	Mario	Actor
August 27	Jack Kesy	Actor
August 28	Armie Hammer	Actor
August 29	Lea Michele	Actress (Glee, Scream Queens)
August 29	Nicole Byer	Actress
August 31	Ryan Kelley	Actor (Teen Wolf)
August 31	Spencer Klein	Actor (Mad About You, Hey Arnold!)
August 31	Brent Morin	Actor
September 1	Camille Mana	Actress (One on One)
September 5	Davida Williams	Actress (Lizzie McGuire, Degrassi: The Next Generation, As the World Turns)
September 8	Leah LaBelle	American singer (American Idol) (d. 2018)
September 10	Sarah Levy	Actress
September 12	Alfie Allen	English actor (Game of Thrones)
September 12	Emmy Rossum	Actress (Shameless) and singer-songwriter
September 12	Molly Tarlov	Actress (Awkward)
September 14	A. J. Trauth	Actor (Even Stevens, Kim Possible)
September 15	Heidi Montag	Actress (Laguna Beach: The Real Orange County, The Hills)
September 15	Jenna Marbles	American former YouTuber
September 15	George Watsky	American rapper
September 16	Ian Harding	Actor (Pretty Little Liars)
September 16	Kyla Pratt	Actress (One on One, Let's Stay Together, Recovery Road, The Proud Family)
September 18	Danielle Jonas	Actress (Married to Jonas) and television personality
September 19	Mandy Musgrave	Actress (Days of Our Lives, South of Nowhere)
September 19	Peter Vack	Actor
September 20	Aldis Hodge	Actor (A.T.O.M., Leverage, Turn: Washington's Spies, Underground)
September 23	Kaylee DeFer	Actress (The War at Home, Gossip Girl)
September 24	Eloise Mumford	Actress (The River)
September 24	Alex Paxton-Beesley	Actress
September 26	Ashley Leggat	Canadian actress
September 26	Sean Doolittle	American professional baseball pitcher
September 28	Hannah Leder	Actress
September 29	Lisa Foiles	Actress (All That)
September 29	Lo Bosworth	Actress (Laguna Beach: The Real Orange County, The Hills)
September 30	Ki Hong Lee	South Korean actor (The Nine Lives of Chloe King, Unbreakable Kimmy Schmidt)
October 1	Jurnee Smollett	Actress (On Our Own, Friday Night Lights, The Defenders, True Blood, Underground)
October 2	Camilla Belle	Actress
October 7	Amber Stevens West	Actress (Greek, The Carmichael Show, Ghosted, Happy Together)
October 7	Holland Roden	Actress (Teen Wolf)
October 10	Lucy Griffiths	English actress (Robin Hood, True Blood, Preacher)
October 18	Renee Bargh	Australian entertainment reporter
October 12	Tyler Blackburn	Actor (Pretty Little Liars, Ravenswood)
October 12	Marcus T. Paulk	Actor (Moesha, The Proud Family) and rapper
October 13	Raquel Lee	Actress (The Amanda Show, The Proud Family)
October 13	Julia McIlvaine	Voice actress (June on KaBlam!)
October 17	Kristine Leahy	American television host
October 22	Kyle Gallner	Actor
October 23	Briana Evigan	Actress and daughter of Greg Evigan
October 23	Emilia Clarke	English actress (Game of Thrones)
October 23	Jessica Stroup	Actress (90210)
October 24	Drake	Canadian actor (Degrassi: The Next Generation) and rapper
October 25	Annabelle Dexter-Jones	Actress
October 27	Inbar Lavi	Israeli actress (Prison Break, Underemployed, Gang Related, Imposters)
October 27	Christine Evangelista	Actress
October 28	May Calamawy	Egyptian-Palestinian actress (Ramy, Moon Knight)
October 29	Italia Ricci	Canadian actress (Unnatural History)
November 1	Penn Badgley	Actor (The Young and the Restless, The Mountain, The Bedford Diaries, Gossip Girl)
November 3	Antonia Thomas	Actress
November 3	Joseline Hernandez	Actress
November 4	Alexz Johnson	Actress (So Weird)
November 6	Katie Leclerc	Actress (Switched at Birth)
November 10	Josh Peck	Actor (The Amanda Show, Drake & Josh, Grandfathered, Whatever Happened to... Robot Jones?, Teenage Mutant Ninja Turtles)
November 11	Rafael de la Fuente	Venezuelan actor (Every Witch Way, Empire, Dynasty)
November 11	Jon Batiste	Singer
November 14	Cory Michael Smith	Actor (Gotham)
November 16	Winston Duke	Actor
November 17	Mitchah Williams	Actor (Lizzie McGuire)
November 18	Joseph Ashton	Actor (L.A. Doctors, Hey Arnold!, Rocket Power)
November 18	Georgia King	Actress
November 20	Ashley Fink	Actress (Glee)
November 21	Jordan Warkol	Voice actor (Hey Arnold!, Rocket Power)
November 21	Sam Palladio	British actor (Nashville)
November 21	Colleen Ballinger	Comedian and actress
November 24	Maya Kazan	Actress
November 25	Katie Cassidy	Actress (Harper's Island, Melrose Place, Arrow), singer and daughter of David Cassidy
November 25	Cole Escola	Actor
November 28	Johnny Simmons	Actor
December 1	Scott Evans	American host
December 5	Erin McGathy	American actress
December 7	Chris Chalk	American actor
December 8	Jo Firestone	American actress
December 10	Elaine Welteroth	American television host
December 11	Alex House	Canadian actor (Degrassi: The Next Generation, Total Drama)
December 11	Condola Rashad	Actress (Steel Magnolias)
December 13	Sunita Mani	Actress
December 17	Emma Bell	Actress (Dallas)
December 17	Vanessa Zima	Actress
December 20	Conner O'Malley	Actor
December 23	Noël Wells	Actress (Saturday Night Live, Master of None), voice actress (Wander Over Yonder, Craig of the Creek) and singer
December 26	Kit Harington	English actor (Game of Thrones)
December 30	Caity Lotz	Actress (Death Valley, Arrow, Legends of Tomorrow)

== Deaths ==
Date	Name	Age	Notability
January 4	Phil Lynott	36	Irish musician (Thin Lizzy)
January 14	Donna Reed	64	Actress (The Donna Reed Show, Dallas)
January 24	Gordon MacRae	64	Actor and singer
January 29	Leif Erickson	74	Actor (The High Chaparral)
March 30	James Cagney	86	Actor and dancer
May 28	Don MacLaughlin	79	Actor (Chris Hughes on As the World Turns)
June 14	Marlin Perkins	81	Zoologist, host of (Mutual of Omaha's Wild Kingdom)
July 15	Florence Halop	63	Actress (Florence on Night Court)
August 26	Ted Knight	62	Actor (Ted Baxter on The Mary Tyler Moore Show)
September 12	Frank Nelson	75	Actor
September 27	Cliff Burton	24	Musician/songwriter (Metallica)
October 25	Forrest Tucker	67	Actor (F Troop)
November 2	Paul Frees	66	Voice actor (Boris Badenov on The Rocky and Bullwinkle Show, 1st voice for the Pillsbury Doughboy)
November 11	Roger C. Carmel	54	Actor (The Transformers, Adventures of the Gummi Bears)
November 18	Gia Carangi	26	American model
November 22	Scatman Crothers	76	Actor (Harlem Globetrotters, Hong Kong Phooey, The Transformers)
December 2	Desi Arnaz	69	Actor and musician (Ricky Ricardo on I Love Lucy)

== See also ==
- 1986 in the United States
- List of American films of 1986
