= 1985–86 United States network television schedule =

US primetime television schedule for the fall of 1985

The 1985–86 network television schedule for the three major English language commercial broadcast networks in the United States covers primetime hours from September 1985 through August 1986. The schedule is followed by a list per network of returning series, new series, and series cancelled after the 1984–85 season.

PBS is not included; member stations have local flexibility over most of their schedules and broadcast times for network shows may vary.

Each of the 30 highest-rated shows released in May 1986 is listed with its rank and rating as determined by Nielsen Media Research. Most of the ratings come from AmericanRadioHistory.com's PDF archive. This was the first television season wherein the Nielsen people meter technology was used for the nationwide audience measurement system, largely replacing the diaries system in place from the 1950-1951 television season.

== Legend ==
- Light blue indicates local programming.
- Gray indicates encore programming.
- Blue-gray indicates news programming.
- Light green indicates sporting events.
- Red indicates series being burned off and other irregularly scheduled programs, including specials and movies.
- Light gold indicates programming produced outside of the United States.
- highlight Lime highlights indicates the number-one most watched program of the season.
- highlight Yellow highlights indicates the top-10 most watched programs of the season.
- highlight Cyan highlights indicates numbers 11-20 most watched programs of the season.
- highlight Magenta highlights indicates numbers 21-30 most watched programs of the season.
- highlight Highlights indicates that it falls in multiple of the above categories.

== Schedule ==
- New series are highlighted in **bold**.
- Repeat airings or same-day rebroadcasts are indicated by **(R)**.
- All times are U.S. Eastern and Pacific Time (except for some live sports or events). Subtract one hour for Central, Mountain, Alaska and Hawaii–Aleutian times.

=== Sunday ===
Network		7:00 p.m.	7:30 p.m.	8:00 p.m.	8:30 p.m.	9:00 p.m.	9:30 p.m.	10:00 p.m.	10:30 p.m.
ABC	Fall	Ripley's Believe It or Not!		**MacGyver**		The ABC Sunday Night Movie			
ABC	Winter	**The Disney Sunday Movie**				The ABC Sunday Night Movie			
CBS	Fall	60 Minutes (4/23.9)		Murder, She Wrote (3/25.3)		Crazy Like a Fox		Trapper John, M.D.	
CBS	Winter	60 Minutes (4/23.9)		Murder, She Wrote (3/25.3)		**CBS Sunday Movie** (12/20.5)			
NBC	Fall	Punky Brewster	Silver Spoons	**Amazing Stories**	**Alfred Hitchcock Presents**	NBC Sunday Night at the Movies (21/18.5)			
NBC	Spring	Silver Spoons	**Fathers and Sons**	**Amazing Stories**	**Alfred Hitchcock Presents**	NBC Sunday Night at the Movies (21/18.5)			
NBC	Late spring	Silver Spoons	Punky Brewster	Various programming (Note: Between May and July 1986, NBC's Sunday night lineup between 8 and 11 p.m. consisted on NBC Sunday Night at the Movies with various repeats following at 10 or 10:30 p.m., or special programming during the entire three-hour block.)					
NBC	August	Silver Spoons	Punky Brewster	**Dalton's Code of Vengeance**		NBC Sunday Night at the Movies (21/18.5)			

=== Monday ===
Network		8:00 p.m.	8:30 p.m.	9:00 p.m.	9:30 p.m.	10:00 p.m.	10:30 p.m.
ABC	Fall	Hardcastle and McCormick		Monday Night Football (15/19.8)			
ABC	Winter	Hardcastle and McCormick		ABC Monday Night Movie			
ABC	June	**The Insiders**		ABC Monday Night Movie			
ABC	Mid-summer	Monday Night Baseball					
CBS		Scarecrow and Mrs. King (28/17.4)		Kate & Allie (14/20.0)	Newhart (16/19.6)	Cagney & Lacey	
NBC	Fall	TV's Bloopers & Practical Jokes		NBC Monday Night at the Movies (22/18.3) (Tied with Hotel)			
NBC	Winter	**You Again?** (19/19.2)	**Valerie** (24/18.1) (Tied with Moonlighting and Falcon Crest)	NBC Monday Night at the Movies (22/18.3) (Tied with Hotel)			
NBC	Spring	**Valerie** (24/18.1) (Tied with Moonlighting and Falcon Crest)	**You Again?** (19/19.2)	NBC Monday Night at the Movies (22/18.3) (Tied with Hotel)			
NBC	Late spring	**Valerie** (24/18.1) (Tied with Moonlighting and Falcon Crest)	**Amazing Stories**	NBC Monday Night at the Movies (22/18.3) (Tied with Hotel)			

=== Tuesday ===
Network		8:00 p.m.	8:30 p.m.	9:00 p.m.	9:30 p.m.	10:00 p.m.	10:30 p.m.
ABC	Fall	Who's the Boss? (10/21.1)	**Growing Pains** (17/19.5) (Tied with Knots Landing)	Moonlighting (24/18.1) (Tied with Falcon Crest and **Valerie**)		**Our Family Honor**	
ABC	Mid-fall	Who's the Boss? (10/21.1)	**Growing Pains** (17/19.5) (Tied with Knots Landing)	Moonlighting (24/18.1) (Tied with Falcon Crest and **Valerie**)		**Spenser: For Hire**	
ABC	Spring	Who's the Boss? (10/21.1)	**Perfect Strangers**	Moonlighting (24/18.1) (Tied with Falcon Crest and **Valerie**)		**Spenser: For Hire**	
ABC	Mid-spring	Who's the Boss? (10/21.1)	**Growing Pains** (17/19.5) (Tied with Knots Landing)	Moonlighting (24/18.1) (Tied with Falcon Crest and **Valerie**)		**Spenser: For Hire**	
ABC	Summer	Who's the Boss? (10/21.1)	**Perfect Strangers**	Moonlighting (24/18.1) (Tied with Falcon Crest and **Valerie**)		**Spenser: For Hire**	
ABC	Mid-summer	Who's the Boss? (10/21.1)	**Growing Pains** (17/19.5) (Tied with Knots Landing)	Moonlighting (24/18.1) (Tied with Falcon Crest and **Valerie**)		**Spenser: For Hire**	
CBS	Fall	**Hometown**		CBS Tuesday Night Movie			
CBS	Mid-fall	Various programming (Note: Various repeats and specials)		CBS Tuesday Night Movie			
CBS	Late fall	**Stir Crazy**		CBS Tuesday Night Movie			
CBS	Mid-winter	Various programming		Trapper John, M.D.		Various programming	
CBS	Late winter	Trapper John, M.D.		CBS Tuesday Night Movie			
CBS	Spring	**Morningstar/Eveningstar**		**Mary**	**Foley Square**	**The Equalizer**	
CBS	Mid-spring	**Morningstar/Eveningstar**		Mickey Spillane's Mike Hammer (R)		**The Equalizer**	
CBS	Summer	Simon & Simon (R)		Magnum, P.I. (R)		**The Equalizer**	
NBC	Fall	The A-Team (30/16.9)		Riptide		Remington Steele	
NBC	Winter	The A-Team (30/16.9)		Riptide		Remington Steele	
NBC	Spring	The A-Team (30/16.9)		Hunter		**Stingray**	
NBC	Summer	The A-Team (30/16.9)		Hunter		**1986**	
NBC	Late summer	NBC Tuesday Night at the Movies				**1986**	

Notes:

- The premiere episode of **Melba** and a new episode of **Charlie & Co.** aired at 8 and 8:30 p.m. respectively on January 28, 1986 (the day of the Space Shuttle Challenger disaster), but both shows were put on hiatus immediately afterwards. The former was burned off during the summer and the latter resumed airing in a different slot during the spring.
- Mickey Spillane's Mike Hammer consisted on repeats of the 1983–84 series.
- **1986** aired as a "preview" series in advance of the 1986–87 season.

=== Wednesday ===
Network		8:00 p.m.	8:30 p.m.	9:00 p.m.	9:30 p.m.	10:00 p.m.	10:30 p.m.
ABC	Fall	**The Insiders**		Dynasty (7/21.8) (Tied with **The Golden Girls**)		Hotel (22/18.3) (Tied with The NBC Monday Movie)	
ABC	Winter	**MacGyver**		Dynasty (7/21.8) (Tied with **The Golden Girls**)		Hotel (22/18.3) (Tied with The NBC Monday Movie)	
ABC	Summer	**MacGyver**		Hardcastle and McCormick (R)		Hotel (22/18.3) (Tied with The NBC Monday Movie)	
ABC	Mid-summer	**Perfect Strangers** (R)	**Mr. Sunshine** (R)	**MacGyver**		Hotel (22/18.3) (Tied with The NBC Monday Movie)	
CBS	Fall	**Stir Crazy**		**Charlie & Co.**	**George Burns Comedy Week**	**The Equalizer**	
CBS	Mid-fall	Special programming		**Charlie & Co.**	**George Burns Comedy Week**	**The Equalizer**	
CBS	Late fall	**Mary**	**Foley Square**	**Charlie & Co.**	**George Burns Comedy Week**	**The Equalizer**	
CBS	Winter	**Mary**	**Foley Square**	Crazy Like a Fox		**The Equalizer**	
CBS	Spring	**Fast Times**	**Tough Cookies**	CBS Wednesday Night Movie			
CBS	Mid-spring	West 57th		CBS Wednesday Night Movie			
CBS	Summer	**Foley Square**	**Charlie & Co.**	Airwolf (R)		West 57th	
NBC	Fall	Highway to Heaven (13/20.1)		**Hell Town**		St. Elsewhere	
NBC	Winter	Highway to Heaven (13/20.1)		**Blacke's Magic**		St. Elsewhere	
NBC	Summer	Highway to Heaven (13/20.1)		Gimme a Break! (R)	**You Again?** (R)	St. Elsewhere	

=== Thursday ===
Network		8:00 p.m.	8:30 p.m.	9:00 p.m.	9:30 p.m.	10:00 p.m.	10:30 p.m.
ABC	Fall	The Fall Guy		**Lady Blue**		20/20	
ABC	Mid-fall	ABC Thursday Night Movie				20/20	
ABC	Late fall	**Shadow Chasers**		**The Colbys**		20/20	
ABC	Winter	Ripley's Believe It or Not!		**The Colbys**		20/20	
CBS	Fall	Magnum, P.I.		Simon & Simon (29/17.2)		Knots Landing (17/19.5) (Tied with **Growing Pains**)	
CBS	Winter	Magnum, P.I.		Simon & Simon (29/17.2)		Knots Landing (17/19.5) (Tied with **Growing Pains**)	
CBS	Spring	Simon & Simon (29/17.2)		**Bridges to Cross**		Knots Landing (17/19.5) (Tied with **Growing Pains**)	
CBS	Summer	Crazy Like a Fox (R)		Trapper John, M.D. (R)		Knots Landing (17/19.5) (Tied with **Growing Pains**)	
CBS	Mid-summer	Crazy Like a Fox (R)		CBS Thursday Night Movie			
CBS	Late summer	**Price is Right Special**		Crazy Like a Fox (R)		Trapper John, M.D.	
NBC	Fall	The Cosby Show (1/33.7)	Family Ties (2/30.0)	Cheers (5/23.7)	Night Court (11/20.9)	Hill Street Blues	
NBC	Late winter	The Cosby Show (1/33.7)	Family Ties (2/30.0)	Cheers (5/23.7)	**All Is Forgiven**	Hill Street Blues	
NBC	Spring	The Cosby Show (1/33.7)	Family Ties (2/30.0)	Cheers (5/23.7)	Night Court (11/20.9)	Hill Street Blues	
NBC	Summer	The Cosby Show (1/33.7)	Family Ties (2/30.0)	Cheers (5/23.7)	**All Is Forgiven**	Hill Street Blues	
NBC	Mid-summer	The Cosby Show (1/33.7)	Family Ties (2/30.0)	Cheers (5/23.7)	Night Court (11/20.9)	Hill Street Blues	

=== Friday ===
Network		8:00 p.m.	8:30 p.m.	9:00 p.m.	9:30 p.m.	10:00 p.m.	10:30 p.m.
ABC	Fall	Webster	Mr. Belvedere	Diff'rent Strokes	Benson	**Spenser: For Hire**	
ABC	Mid-fall	Webster	Mr. Belvedere	Diff'rent Strokes	Benson	**Our Family Honor**	
ABC	Winter	Webster	Mr. Belvedere	Diff'rent Strokes	**He's the Mayor**	The Fall Guy	
ABC	Spring	Webster	Mr. Belvedere	**Mr. Sunshine**	**Joe Bash**	The Fall Guy	
ABC	Mid-spring	Webster	Mr. Belvedere	The ABC Friday Night Movie			
ABC	Summer	Webster	Mr. Belvedere	**Mr. Sunshine**	Various programming (Note: Sitcom repeats and specials)	The Love Boat (R)	
ABC	Late summer	Webster	Mr. Belvedere	Various programming (Note: Sitcom repeats, specials, airings of unsold pilots and movies)			
CBS	Fall	**The Twilight Zone**		Dallas (6/21.9)		Falcon Crest (24/18.1) (Tied with Moonlighting and **Valerie**)	
CBS	Winter	**The Twilight Zone**		Dallas (6/21.9)		Falcon Crest (24/18.1) (Tied with Moonlighting and **Valerie**)	
CBS	Spring	**Charlie & Co.**	**Leo & Liz in Beverly Hills**	Dallas (6/21.9)		Falcon Crest (24/18.1) (Tied with Moonlighting and **Valerie**)	
CBS	Summer	**The Twilight Zone**		CBS Friday Movie			
NBC	Fall	Knight Rider		**Misfits of Science**		Miami Vice (9/21.3)	
NBC	Winter	**Misfits of Science**		Knight Rider		Miami Vice (9/21.3)	
NBC	Late winter	Riptide		Knight Rider		Miami Vice (9/21.3)	
NBC	Spring	Riptide		**The Last Precinct**		Miami Vice (9/21.3)	
NBC	Mid-spring	Knight Rider		**The Last Precinct**		Miami Vice (9/21.3)	
NBC	Summer	Knight Rider		Miami Vice (9/21.3)		**Stingray** (R)	
NBC	Late summer	The A-Team (R)		Miami Vice (9/21.3)		Riptide	

Note:

- Diff'rent Strokes aired a one-hour season premiere on September 27 at 9:00pm.

=== Saturday ===
Network		8:00 p.m.	8:30 p.m.	9:00 p.m.	9:30 p.m.	10:00 p.m.	10:30 p.m.
ABC	Fall	**Hollywood Beat**		**Lime Street**		The Love Boat	
ABC	Mid-fall	The Fall Guy		**Lady Blue**		The Love Boat	
ABC	Winter	**The Redd Foxx Show**	Benson	**Fortune Dane**		The Love Boat	
ABC	Spring	**The Redd Foxx Show**	Benson	The Love Boat (R)		The Love Boat	
ABC	Mid-spring	**Mr. Sunshine**	Benson	The Love Boat (R)		The Love Boat	
ABC	Summer	Diff'rent Strokes (R)	Benson	ABC Saturday Night Movie			
CBS	Fall	Airwolf		CBS Saturday Night Movie			
CBS	Spring	Crazy Like a Fox		CBS Saturday Night Movie			
CBS	Mid-spring	Crazy Like a Fox		Airwolf		Magnum, P.I.	
CBS	Summer	Various programming (Note: CBS' Saturday night line-up between May and July 1986 consisted mostly on three-hour broadcasts of the CBS Saturday Night Movie, although some weeks featured various repeats and specials on the 8–8:30 or 8–9 p.m. period.)					
CBS	August	**Melba**	CBS Saturday Night Movie				
NBC	Fall	Gimme a Break!	The Facts of Life (27/17.7)	**The Golden Girls** (7/21.8) (Tied with Dynasty)	**227** (20/18.8)	Hunter	
NBC	Spring	Gimme a Break!	The Facts of Life (27/17.7)	**The Golden Girls** (7/21.8) (Tied with Dynasty)	**All Is Forgiven**	Remington Steele	
NBC	Mid-spring	Gimme a Break!	The Facts of Life (27/17.7)	**The Golden Girls** (7/21.8) (Tied with Dynasty)	**227** (20/18.8)	Remington Steele	
NBC	Summer	The Facts of Life (27/17.7)	**227** (20/18.8)	**The Golden Girls** (7/21.8) (Tied with Dynasty)	**Me & Mrs. C**	Remington Steele	
NBC	Late summer	The Facts of Life (27/17.7)	**227** (20/18.8)	**The Golden Girls** (7/21.8) (Tied with Dynasty)	Various programming		

Notes:

- Due to the death of Samantha Smith and her father in a plane crash, ABC ceased production of **Lime Street** and was forced to move **Lady Blue** into its slot.
- The Love Boat had a number of two-hour episodes throughout the season, airing from 9 to 11 p.m. Assorted repeats from previous seasons aired in the 9 p.m. slot during the spring.

== By network ==
=== ABC ===
Returning series

- 20/20
- The ABC Friday Night Movie
- ABC Monday Night Movie
- The ABC Sunday Night Movie
- The ABC Thursday Night Movie
- Benson
- Diff'rent Strokes (moved from NBC)
- Dynasty
- The Fall Guy
- Hardcastle and McCormick
- Hotel
- Life's Most Embarrassing Moments
- The Love Boat
- Mr. Belvedere
- Monday Night Baseball
- Monday Night Football
- Moonlighting
- Ripley's Believe It or Not!
- Webster
- Who's the Boss?

New series

- The Colbys *
- The Disney Sunday Movie *
- Fortune Dane *
- Growing Pains
- He's the Mayor *
- Hollywood Beat
- The Insiders
- Joe Bash *
- Lady Blue
- Lime Street
- MacGyver
- Mr. Sunshine *
- Our Family Honor
- Perfect Strangers *
- The Redd Foxx Show *
- Shadow Chasers *
- Spenser: For Hire

Not returning from 1984–85:

- Call to Glory
- Eye to Eye
- Finder of Lost Loves
- Foul-Ups, Bleeps & Blunders
- Glitter
- Hawaiian Heat
- Jessie
- MacGruder and Loud
- Matt Houston
- Me and Mom
- Off the Rack
- Paper Dolls
- People Do the Craziest Things
- Rock 'n' Roll Summer Action
- Street Hawk
- T. J. Hooker @
- Three's a Crowd
- Wildside

=== CBS ===
Returning series

- 60 Minutes
- Airwolf
- Cagney & Lacey
- CBS Sunday Movie
- Crazy Like a Fox
- Dallas
- Falcon Crest
- Kate & Allie
- Knots Landing
- Magnum, P.I.
- Murder, She Wrote
- Newhart
- Scarecrow and Mrs. King
- Simon & Simon
- Trapper John, M.D.
- West 57th

New series

- Bridges to Cross *
- Charlie & Co.
- The Equalizer
- Fast Times *
- Foley Square *
- George Burns Comedy Week
- Hometown
- Leo & Liz in Beverly Hills *
- Mary *
- Melba *
- Morningstar/Eveningstar *
- Stir Crazy
- Tough Cookies *
- The Twilight Zone

Not returning from 1984–85:

- AfterMASH
- Alice
- Charles in Charge (Moved to Syndication)
- Cover Up
- Detective in the House
- Double Dare
- Dreams
- The Dukes of Hazzard
- E/R
- I Had Three Wives
- The Jeffersons
- The Lucie Arnaz Show
- Mickey Spillane's Mike Hammer +
- Otherworld

=== NBC ===
Returning series

- The A-Team
- Cheers
- The Cosby Show
- The Facts of Life
- Family Ties
- Gimme a Break!
- Highway to Heaven
- Hill Street Blues
- Hunter
- Knight Rider
- Miami Vice
- NBC Sunday Night Movie
- NBC Monday Night at the Movies
- Night Court
- Punky Brewster
- Remington Steele
- Riptide
- St. Elsewhere
- Silver Spoons
- TV's Bloopers & Practical Jokes

New series

- 1986 *
- 227
- Alfred Hitchcock Presents
- All Is Forgiven *
- Amazing Stories
- Blacke's Magic *
- Dalton's Code of Vengeance *
- Fathers and Sons *
- The Golden Girls
- Hell Town
- The Last Precinct *
- Me & Mrs. C *
- Misfits of Science
- Stingray *
- Valerie *
- You Again? *

Not returning from 1984–85:

- Berrenger's
- The Best Times
- Code Name: Foxfire
- Diff'rent Strokes (moved to ABC)
- Double Trouble
- Half Nelson
- Hot Pursuit
- It's Your Move
- Motown Revue
- OceanQuest
- Our Time
- Partners in Crime
- Sara
- Spencer/Under One Roof
- V

Note: The * indicates that the program was introduced in midseason.

^ Diff'rent Strokes switched networks for the 1985–1986 season.

+ Mike Hammer abruptly ended production after series star Stacy Keach was sentenced to six months in prison for cocaine possession. Production resumed during the 1986–1987 season.

@ T. J. Hooker continued production for CBS' late night schedule for the 1985–1986 season.

== See also ==
- 1985–86 United States network television schedule (daytime)
- 1985–86 United States network television schedule (late night)
