= One Police Plaza (film) =

1986 film by Jerry Jameson

- Directed by: Jerry Jameson
- Written by: Paul King, based on the book by William Caunitz
- Produced by: Stanley Hough
- Starring: Robert Conrad; Anthony Zerbe; George Dzundza; Jamey Sheridan; Larry Riley; Lisa Banes
- Cinematography: Guy Dufaux
- Edited by: George W. Brooks
- Music by: Mark Snow
- Release date: 29 November 1986
- Countries: United States; Canada
- Language: English

One Police Plaza is a 1986 Canadian-American television film directed by Jerry Jameson. The musical score was composed by Mark Snow. The film starring Robert Conrad, George Dzundza, James Olson, Jamey Sheridan, Larry Riley, Lisa Banes and Joe Grifasi in the lead roles.

The characters returned in The Red Spider (1988), including Lieutenant Daniel B. Malone played by James Farentino. It aired on CBS on April 21, 1988.

== Cast ==
- Robert Conrad as Lieutenant Daniel B. Malone
- George Dzundza as Detective Gustav Stamm
- James Olson as Whitney Zangline
- Jamey Sheridan as Detective Bo Davis
- Larry Riley as Detective Starling
- Lisa Banes as Erica
- Joe Grifasi as Inspector Nicholas Zambrano
- Stephen Joyce as Chief Dennie McQuade
- Earl Hindman as Detective Jake Stern
- Anthony Zerbe as Yakov Anderman
- Janet-Laine Green as Janet Fox
- Peter MacNeill as David Ancorie
- Barton Heyman as Judge Niarxos
- Nicholas Hormann as Morris Dunbar
