= Larry Riley (actor) =

American actor and musician (1952–1992)

- Riley as Frank Williams in Knots Landing
- Born: June 20, 1952; Memphis, Tennessee, U.S.
- Died: June 6, 1992 (aged 39); Burbank, California, U.S.
- Occupations: Actor; musician
- Years active: 1971–1992
- Spouse: Nina Girvetz (m. 1991–1992)

Larry Riley (June 20, 1952 – June 6, 1992) was an American actor and musician, best known for his role as C.J. Memphis in the film A Soldier's Story (1984) and as Frank Williams in the prime-time TV soap opera Knots Landing.

== Early life and career ==
Born in Memphis, Tennessee, Riley began acting in high school before studying drama at Memphis State University. He made his professional stage debut in 1971, and went on to appear in various stage productions on and off-Broadway including A Broadway Musical, Shakespeare's Cabaret, I Love My Wife, and Big River, a musical based on Adventures of Huckleberry Finn. In 1982, Riley won a Clarence Derwent and Obie Award for his performance in A Soldier's Play. He later reprised the role in the 1984 film based on the play. From 1984 to 1985, Riley portrayed the role of Curtis Taylor, Jr. in the national touring company of Dreamgirls. He also appeared as the leading player in the U.S. touring company of Pippin.

From 1980 to 1982, Riley portrayed Calvin Barnes in the NBC daytime soap opera The Doctors. He later had guest roles on Hill Street Blues and Miami Vice, and appeared in Louis Malle's 1984 film Crackers. In 1985, Riley starred in the short-lived sitcom Stir Crazy, based on the 1980 film of the same name. In 1988, he won the role of Frank Williams on the long-running nighttime soap Knots Landing, becoming the series' first regular African American cast member. The role garnered Riley a Soap Opera Digest Award for Outstanding Actor in a Primetime Supporting Role in 1991. Riley also created a musical tribute to Louis Jordan entitled "Let The Good Times Roll", which enjoyed success at the Cinegrill of the Hollywood Roosevelt Hotel in 1988. He also voiced the arch-villain Dumping Jack Trash in the children's animated series Fantastic Max.

In addition to acting, Riley was also a musician and singer. He performed two songs in his role as Reverend Gillis in the Emmy-nominated Polly and the following year's sequel, Polly! Comin' Home. He sang in several episodes of Knots Landing and also composed the score for several episodes.

== Illness and death ==
In May 1989, Riley entered rehab for drug and alcohol abuse. The following year, he discovered he was HIV positive. According to his wife Nina, Riley "was not gay. He was not bisexual. He did not use needles at all. He speculated it was from a woman. Because he was quite the womanizer." Fearful that news of his diagnosis would ruin his career, Riley did not disclose his illness to anyone except his wife and continued working on Knots Landing until his death. To explain his dramatic weight loss, Riley claimed that he was suffering from kidney failure due to high blood pressure. Riley's true illness was revealed by his wife and doctor after his death.

On June 6, 1992, Riley died of AIDS-related kidney failure in Burbank, California, only two weeks short of his 40th birthday. He was survived by his second wife Nina and a son, Larry, Jr.

== Filmography ==
Year	Title	Role	Notes
1980–1982	The Doctors	Calvin Barnes	Unknown episodes
1982	Muggable Mary, Street Cop	Steve Kelsey	TV movie
1982	Hill Street Blues	Vernon Tucker	Episode: "Little Boil Blue"
1984	Crackers	Boardwalk	
1984	A Soldier's Story	C.J. Memphis	
1984	Miami Vice	Bobby Price	Episode: "Cool Runnin'"
1985	Stir Crazy	Harry Fletcher	9 episodes
1985	Badge of the Assassin	Herman Bell	TV movie
1986	The Twilight Zone	Joshua	Episode: "Quarantine"
1986	The Fall Guy	Cleveland Tudor	Episode: "Two on a Skip"
1986	One Police Plaza	Detective Starling	TV movie
1987	Spenser: For Hire	Bo Braxton	Episode: "One for My Daughter"
1987	Long Gone	Joe Louis Brown	TV movie
1988–1992	Knots Landing	Frank Williams	111 episodes, (final appearance)
1988	Dead Solid Perfect	Spec	TV movie
1988	Fantastic Max	Dumping Jack Trash	Voice, 3 episodes
1989	Unconquered	Dr. Martin Luther King Jr.	TV movie
1989	Polly	Reverend Gillis	TV movie
1990	Polly: Comin' Home!	Reverend Gillis	TV movie

== Awards and nominations ==
Awards and nominations
Year	Award	Category	Title of work	Result
1982	Clarence Derwent Awards	Most Promising Male	A Soldier's Play	Won
1982	Drama Desk Award	Outstanding Featured Actor in a Play	A Soldier's Play	Nominated
1990	Soap Opera Digest Awards	Outstanding Supporting Actor: Prime Time	Knots Landing	Nominated
1991	Soap Opera Digest Awards	Outstanding Supporting Actor: Prime Time	Knots Landing	Won
1992	Soap Opera Digest Awards	Outstanding Actor: Prime Time	Knots Landing	Nominated
