= 20th Television =

American television studio company

20th Television, Inc.
- Logo used since 2020
- Formerly: TCF Television Productions, Inc. (1949–1958); 20th Century-Fox Television (1958–1985); 20th Century Fox Television (1985–1989, 1994–2020)
- Type: Division
- Industry: Television production
- Predecessors: Four Star Television; MTM Enterprises; 20th Television (first incarnation); Touchstone Television (second incarnation); ABC Signature
- Founded: March 15, 1949; 77 years ago
- Headquarters: Walt Disney Studios, Burbank, California, United States
- Key people: Karey Burke (president)
- Products: Television programs
- Parent: 20th Century Fox (1949–2014); Fox Television Group (2014–2019); Disney Television Studios (2019–present)
- Subsidiaries: New Regency Television International (50%)
- Website: www.fox.com

20th Television, Inc. (also referred to as 20th Century Television; formerly known as TCF Television Productions, Inc., 20th Century-Fox Television and 20th Century Fox Television) is an American television production company owned by Disney Television Studios, a division of the Disney Entertainment business segment of the Walt Disney Company. Founded on March 15, 1949, productions from this company are distributed on/in home media formats by Walt Disney Studios Home Entertainment through the 20th Century Home Entertainment banner.

20th Television was the television arm of 20th Century Fox and was part of the majority of 21st Century Fox's assets acquired by Disney in 2019. On August 10, 2020, Disney dropped the "Fox" word from the names of the acquired 21st Century Fox assets to avoid brand confusion with Fox Corporation; the company's current name was adopted, and subsequently started to use it for the copyright of 20th Television and 20th Television Animation productions on December 4, 2020. Disney Television Studios and 20th Television have both been ABC's flagship television production arms since the closure of ABC Signature on October 1, 2024.

== Divisions ==
20th Television has divisions from before and post-Disney.

- 20th Century Fox Television Distribution (2011–2020) – an American television distribution arm of 20th Century Fox Television for all Fox-produced and/or acquired programming. The company operated from 2011 to 2020.
- FNM/FWP (1990–1994) – the TV movie production arm of TCFTV. The company was known as FNM Films, which stood for "Fox Network Movies". In 1993, the company was renamed Fox West Pictures, until it was reformed as the then-new Fox 2000 Pictures division.
- 20th Century Fox International Television (2001–2002) – an international television production company and a short-lived unit of TCFTV.
- Fox Circle Productions (1994–2005) – a division of 20th Century Fox Television that created TV movies and original programming.
  - National Studios (1995–1998) – a TV movie division of Fox Circle Productions.
- Fox Square Productions (1987–1990s) – a short-lived in-house production unit of the then-new Fox Broadcasting Company.
- 20th Century Fox Telecommunications (1982) – a television production company that only produced The Who Rocks America, a TV movie produced by The Who.
- Fox Television Animation (1999–2020) – an American animation company owned by Disney Television Studios. It used to be the animation division of 20th Century Fox Television and 20th Television since its launch in 1999, until in 2020, Disney announced it would be separate from 20th Television.

== History ==
=== TCF Television Productions (1949–58) ===
20th Century Fox Television was originally formed in 1949 by 20th Century-Fox as other studios were branching out into television production. The company was known as TCF Television Productions, Inc. from its inception until 1958. Its first television series was Crusade in Europe, which was produced for ABC.

In 1955, Fox converted the company's Western Avenue lot in Hollywood as a facility for primarily television production. Shows such as The Many Loves of Dobie Gillis and Perry Mason were filmed on this lot, before it was demolished in 1971.

Fox did not produce another TV show until 1955, when it launched its very first series, The 20th Century-Fox Hour on CBS, after the success of ABC's hit show Disneyland. In 1956, Fox sold its second show to CBS, My Friend Flicka, which is based on the Flicka film series.

Later that year, Irving Asher, who was a very successful film producer, was made general manager of TCF Television Productions. In 1956, Fox sold the Broken Arrow television project, which is based on the 1950 film of the same name, to ABC.

In 1957, Fox cemented a pact with National Telefilm Associates (NTA) to produce How to Marry a Millionaire, which was based on the 1953 film of the same name, and Man Without a Gun. NTA served as distributor of the series, which were to play on the NTA Film Network.

=== 20th Century-Fox Television (1958–89) ===
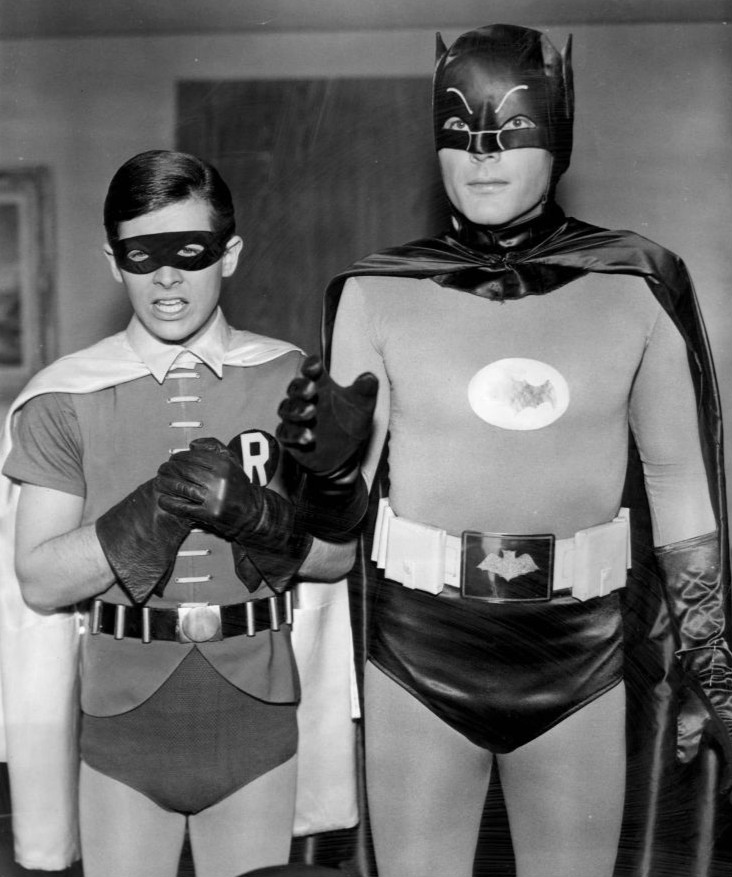
Batman (Adam West) and Robin (Burt Ward) in the 1966–1968 television series, Batman

In 1958, the company was renamed 20th Century-Fox Television (the hyphen in-between the "Century" and "Fox" words was dropped in 1985). Around the same time, Martin Manulis, producer of CBS' Playhouse 90, joined 20th Century-Fox as head of television. Under Manulis' watch, the company developed Adventures in Paradise for ABC, The Many Loves of Dobie Gillis for CBS and Five Fingers for NBC. In the following year, Fox also sold the drama Hong Kong to ABC.

By 1960, Roy Huggins, who was lured from Warner Bros. Television, was tapped to join 20th Century-Fox Television as vice president in charge of production. During Huggins' watch, he refreshed the Hong Kong show. He also oversaw the development of the three programs for ABC, which were the comedy Margie and dramas Follow the Sun and Bus Stop. In 1961, William Self was appointed to replace Huggins.

In 1962, the company decreased its output to one show, then produced none the following year. Roy Huggins departed to join Revue Studios. During the short-lived dark period in 1963, the company had signed Hal Kanter and Paul Monash to production deals. Later that year, highly successful feature film producer Irwin Allen was moved from its feature film unit to its television unit to serve as producer for the studio.

The company had returned to producing prime-time programs by 1964. The first shows were the ABC sitcom Valentine's Day, the ABC dramas Peyton Place, Voyage to the Bottom of the Sea, and 12 O'Clock High; and the NBC drama Daniel Boone. Later that year, William Dozier and his Greenway Productions studio signed a deal with 20th Century-Fox to develop television shows. By 1965, Fox was producing several new shows for primetime, such as The Legend of Jesse James, The Long, Hot Summer, The Loner and Irwin Allen's science-fiction drama Lost in Space, to be followed by Batman, which is based on the comic book series, and Blue Light.

The 1966–67 season proved to be a difficult year for Fox's television unit, which was producing the ABC sitcom The Tammy Grimes Show and the ABC dramas The Man Who Never Was, The Felony Squad, The Green Hornet and Irwin Allen's science-fiction show The Time Tunnel. Although most of the new shows in the season did not last long, Felony Squad turned out to be a hit. The 1967–68 season was similarly poor for Fox, as it only had two new shows, Custer and Judd, for the Defense, both for ABC. Although Custer bombed, Judd, for the Defense was initially popular, but was later cancelled after only two seasons. Fox also expanded its output to commission a Saturday morning show in collaboration with Filmation, Journey to the Center of the Earth.

The 1968–69 season was also difficult for 20th Century-Fox Television, which saw the British co-production Journey to the Unknown and Irwin Allen's final science-fiction drama to be produced, Land of the Giants, for ABC; the CBS drama Lancer; and the NBC sitcoms The Ghost & Mrs. Muir and Julia. Although Julia was deemed a hit, most of the shows in the season crumbled. Fox did have one additional Saturday morning cartoon for Filmation, Fantastic Voyage. In 1969, Fox entered the game show fray by signing a deal to distribute Beat the Clock, a revival of the popular 1950s game show. The decade closed out with the 1969-70 television season and two new programs, Room 222 for ABC and Bracken's World for NBC. Also that year, Grant Tinker was hired to join the studio, but he would quit two years later due to conflicts with running MTM Enterprises.

While the 1970s were difficult for Fox's television unit, the studio initially started off the decade with the shows Nanny and the Professor on ABC and Arnie for CBS, which proved to be modest successes. The studio would then produce M*A*S*H in 1972 for CBS, which would go on to be incredibly successful, lasting eleven seasons. Later on, in 1979, the studio produced Trapper John, M.D., which was popular throughout the 1980s. Other Fox shows for the 1970s, such as Cade's County, The New Perry Mason, Irwin Allen's The Swiss Family Robinson, Young Dan'l Boone, W.E.B., The Paper Chase, Loves Me, Loves Me Not, and Billy all bombed, although The Paper Chase became a cult classic and gave Showtime additional seasons.

Fox also distributed the game show Masquerade Party, produced by Stefan Hatos-Monty Hall Productions, which aired during the 1974–75 season. From 1976 to 1978, Fox distributed Liar's Club, as well as Celebrity Sweepstakes, both of which were produced by Ralph Andrews Productions. In 1973, Fox distributed the syndicated Canadian videotape production The Starlost, produced by Glen-Warren Productions.

In 1980, television producer Glen A. Larson quit Universal and joined 20th Century-Fox Television. The first show was The Fall Guy, which was successful, though it would end up being the only Fox/Larson show to become so. The other collaborations, Trauma Center, Manimal, Automan, Masquerade, Cover Up and Half Nelson did not fare well due to poor ratings. By August 1980, other producers and agencies, like Clyde Phillips (Blue Hill Avenue Productions), former employee of Bob Banner Associates and Marc Merson (Brownstone Productions), former employee of Lorimar Productions had struck a deal with the studio.

Other series of the early 1980s, like Hagen, Breaking Away, Ladies' Man, Jessica Novak, 9 to 5, It's Not Easy, Emerald Point N.A.S. and AfterMASH did not fare well in the ratings, although AfterMASH was initially a minor hit, especially in its first season, and 9 to 5 did well in syndication after being a minor network hit in its original ABC run. In 1984, James L. Brooks and his Gracie Films company was moved to 20th Century-Fox for a film and television partnership, creating a long relationship that lasted until the early 1990s when he moved to Sony. In late 1984, Fox made a deal with Bob Stewart Productions to do a syndicated version of Stewart's CBS daytime game show The $25,000 Pyramid, called The $100,000 Pyramid, which aired for three years.

=== 20th Century Fox Television and the Metromedia buyout/Murdoch era (1985–89) ===
In 1985, after Steven Bochco left MTM and the Hill Street Blues program, he moved to 20th Century Fox Television to start the NBC crime drama L.A. Law and the ABC dramedy Hooperman, and marked the return of success for its television studio. During that same year, Fox returned to success with the sitcom Mr. Belvedere, which was an instantly popular hit. Also that same year, Fox sold its sitcom Charlie & Co. to CBS, which flopped after only one season. The second new sitcom under the Murdoch regime was Fathers and Sons, which was sold to NBC, which also flopped after one season.

In 1986, Fox had purchased the assets of Metromedia, including its television stations and the distribution subsidiary, Metromedia Producers Corporation, which was distributing the series Small Wonder. Metromedia Producers was initially excluded from the purchase and it was expected to be purchased by Robert M. Bennett, however, when Bennett withdrew, Fox was permitted to acquire the company. Fox also sold The Wizard to CBS, and Heart of the City to ABC for the 1986–1987 television season in addition to L.A. Law on NBC, which helped save the television industry of Fox. Fox also introduced the sketch comedy The Tracey Ullman Show, produced by Gracie Films for the Fox network, which introduced The Simpsons, that the success in 1989 that saved Fox's struggling television unit. Fox also distributed the sitcom The New Adventures of Beans Baxter, produced internally by Fox Square Productions.

For the 1987–88 season, Fox sold the sitcom Second Chance to the then-new Fox television network, and sold the drama Leg Work to CBS, and the sitcom Pursuit of Happiness to ABC, in addition to Hooperman.

=== 20th Television (production arm) (1989–1994) ===
In 1989, 20th Century Fox Television's functions were taken over by Twentieth Television Corporation, a separate entity from 20th Century Fox. Both companies were subsidiaries of News Corporation unit Fox Inc.; the move was made to separate the television productions from the film studio in order to increase the latter's output.

For the 1989–90 season, 20th Television was distributing programs from Steven Bochco Productions that were aired on ABC. The first to come out of the deal was Doogie Howser, M.D., which lasted four seasons on the air. Also introduced this season was Alien Nation to the Fox network, as well as Sister Kate for NBC, in addition to The Simpsons. In mid-1990, 20th Television had sold the sitcom Working Girl to NBC. 20th Television also offered the variety series In Living Color to the Fox television network, which introduced the talent of stars like Keenan Ivory Wayans and David Alan Grier.

For the 1990-91 television season, 20th Television sold Working It Out to NBC, and also sold the sitcoms Babes, Good Grief and True Colors to the Fox network. 20th Television also distributed the show Cop Rock, produced by Steven Bochco Productions for ABC via a development deal. Also during this season, 20th Television had purchased The Sunday Comics to the Fox network.

By the 1991–92 season, the 20th Television production company sold the comedy Drexell's Class to the Fox network, and distributed the Steven Bochco crime drama Civil Wars to ABC. 20th Television also distributed the midseason cartoon Capitol Critters, a joint production between Hanna-Barbera and Steven Bochco, to ABC in the spring of 1992, along with the Fox comedy Stand By Your Man, which was part of a contract between Twentieth Television and British producer Allan McKeown's WitzEnd Productions.

Also in 1991, David E. Kelley, who had produced two shows for Steven Bochco, L.A. Law and Doogie Howser, M.D., announced that he was quitting to sign a joint agreement with CBS and 20th Television. The first program to come out of the deal was the family dramedy Picket Fences, which premiered in the 1992–93 season. In 1992, Peter Roth, who had left Stephen J. Cannell's production company, joined 20th Television, and was instrumental in the development of the subsequent seasons.

In the 1992–93 season, 20th Television sold the sitcom Rhythm & Blues to NBC, but it failed to catch on in the ratings. This was followed by a joint production between British-based WitzEnd Productions, 20th Television and CBS Entertainment Productions, Dudley, which was a vehicle for Dudley Moore, which aired in the spring of 1993, but it also failed to catch on in the ratings. The company had also distributed the half-hour crime drama Likely Suspects for the Fox network, which was produced by Four Point Entertainment. In mid-1992, actor Chevy Chase received a deal with 20th Television to star in a late night comedy show, titled The Chevy Chase Show but it tanked after only one season on the air.

By the 1993–94 season, 20th Television sold The X-Files to Fox, which became very profitable for the division, spawning 9 seasons, a revival series and a multimedia franchise. That same season, 20th Television distributed another high-profile project, NYPD Blue for ABC, produced by Steven Bochco Productions, which would go on to last for twelve seasons. Fox also sold South Central, originally proposed by CBS, to the Fox television network for the spring of 1994. Also, for the spring of 1994, Fox distributed the Steven Bochco-produced drama The Byrds of Paradise, which was aired on ABC.

By the 1994–95 season, Chicago Hope, the second show from the Kelley–CBS–20th Television deal, went on to be a hit, lasting for six seasons. The 20th Television production company also sold The 5 Mrs. Buchanans to CBS, and Wild Oats, to the Fox television network.

=== 20th Century Fox Television and the New World era (1994–2019) ===
Logo used as 20th Century Fox Television from 1994 to 2020.

Following a 1994 restructuring of Fox's television production companies, 20th Television was refocused on syndication and "non-traditional programs", while network television programming once more came under the 20th Century Fox Television banner and returned to being a division of the movie studio.

For the 1995–96 season, the new 20th Century Fox Television production company sold the sitcoms The Crew and The Preston Episodes and the adventure series Space: Above and Beyond to the Fox network and Cleghorne! to The WB. It distributed the crime drama Murder One, produced by Steven Bochco Productions, which was sold to ABC during the season.

In 1995, David E. Kelley signed a 5-year agreement with the studio, with the ability to produce television series, the first and third to be on ABC and the second and fourth to be on Fox, and so on. The first two projects to come out of the deal were ABC's The Practice and Fox's Ally McBeal. In 1996, Peter Roth was transferred to becoming president of Fox Entertainment. Chris Carter, writer/producer of The X-Files also extended its contract with 20th Century Fox Television. The first project to come out of the new contract was the science-fiction fantasy drama Millennium. In the summer of 1996, Fox and the production company bought out L.A. Firefighters for a summer run on the Fox network.

In 1996, New World Communications was bought out by News Corporation, which included its television stations, New World/Genesis Distribution and New World Entertainment. The deal was finalized in 1997. Shortly afterwards, Cannell bought back his library of rights from Fox in 1998. Also that same year, Steven Levitan, producers of Just Shoot Me! had signed a contract with 20th Century Fox Television.

In 1997, MTM Enterprises became part of 20th Century Fox Television. MTM at that time was producing three shows The Pretender for NBC, and Good News and Sparks for UPN, at primetime, after layoffs hit at MTM's syndicated unit. Later that year, Fox established another television production company, Fox Television Studios to house smaller production units, under executive David Grant. Also, producer Barbara Hall signed an overall deal with the studio.

In 2003, Lucasfilm and 20th Century Fox Television produced the former's first three series that aired on Cartoon Network, including Star Wars: Clone Wars.

In 2006, TCFTV produced the first two series that aired on Fox's sister network, MyNetworkTV: the telenovelas Desire and Fashion House.

In 2012, 20th Century Fox Television was reorganized as a separate unit of News Corporation.

In July 2014, it was announced that the operations of the Fox Broadcasting Company and 20th Century Fox Television would merge into a new unit called the Fox Television Group.

=== Under Disney Television Studios ===
On March 20, 2019, the Walt Disney Company acquired 20th Century Fox Television, 20th Television and Fox Television Animation as part of its completed acquisition of 21st Century Fox and placed them under the Disney Television Studios division of Walt Disney Television (now Disney Entertainment Television).

On January 17, 2020, it was announced that the "Fox" name would be dropped from several of the 21CF assets acquired by Disney.

On August 10, 2020, 20th Century Fox Television and 20th Television were merged into one unit as part of a restructuring plan by Disney regarding their television production units; the merged company took on the latter's name. In 2020, Disney announced that the Touchstone Television label was folded into 20th Television, while 20th Television Animation would be relaunched as a standalone unit. ABC Signature was dissolved on October 1, 2024, and had its operations folded into 20th Television, which has since become ABC's flagship production arm.

In April 2025, Disney announced that it would not renew its lease with Fox Corporation and that it would vacate the Fox Studio Lot in Century City at the end of 2025. As a result, 20th Television relocated to the Walt Disney Studios in Burbank.

== Predecessors ==
=== 20th Television (distribution arm) ===
Twentieth Television
- Type: Division
- Industry: Television syndication; Advertising sales
- Founded: 1961; 65 years ago
- Defunct: August 10, 2020; 6 years ago
- Fate: Merged with and folded into Disney Media Distribution (now Disney Platform Distribution)
- Successors: Disney Platform Distribution; 20th Television (second incarnation); Fox First Run
- Headquarters: Los Angeles, California, United States
- Parent: 20th Century Fox Television (1961–1989, 2013-2019); Fox Inc. (1989-1994); Fox Television Stations (1994-2013); Disney Television Studios (2019–2020)

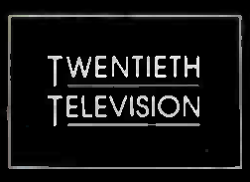
Original logo used from 1989 to 1992.

The original incarnation of 20th Television was the television syndication and distribution arm of 20th Century Fox Television and the 20th Century Fox film studio. It was formed in 1989 in order to separate television production from the 20th Century Fox division which oversaw film production. During this time, 20th Television and 20th Century Fox served as two of Fox's four main units, along with the Fox Broadcasting Company and Fox Television Stations. Following a 1994 restructuring of Fox's divisions, 20th Television was refocused on syndication and "non-traditional programs"; its television production arm was moved back under 20th Century Fox and took the 20th Century Fox Television name.

20th Television distributed almost all programming and documentaries from the television production unit and its subsidiaries and the motion picture studio's output (and their own subdivisions). It owned programming from other production companies and studios they have acquired, including MTM Enterprises, most by Metromedia Producers Corporation, and most by New World Entertainment (including those by Four Star Television and Genesis Entertainment).

The company also syndicated and/or co-syndicates product from partners such as Regency Television and Debmar-Mercury, the latter until April 2019.

As part of the restructuring that stemmed from News Corporation spinning off its entertainment assets into 21st Century Fox, it was announced on July 8, 2013, that 20th Television will operate under the management of 20th Century Fox Television having previously moved under Fox Television Stations. As a result, the former company's president reported to the latter's chairmen.

On August 10, 2020, Disney announced that 20th Century Fox Television was renamed 20th Television, and the syndication arm was absorbed into Disney Media Distribution (now Disney Platform Distribution).

=== Touchstone Television ===
The second incarnation of Touchstone Television (formerly known as Fox 21 Television Studios) was an American television production company that was a subsidiary of Disney Television Studios, the television studios arm of the Walt Disney Television division of the Walt Disney Company. Founded in 2014 from the merger of Fox Television Studios and Fox 21, it was given its second and final name in mid-2020 following the acquisition of 21st Century Fox by Disney and got merged with and folded into 20th Television on December 1, 2020.

=== MTM Enterprises ===
MTM Enterprises (alternatively known as MTM Productions) is an American independent production company established in 1969 by Mary Tyler Moore and her then-husband Grant Tinker to produce The Mary Tyler Moore Show for CBS. The name for the production company was drawn from Moore's initials. MTM produced a number of successful television programs during the 1970s and 1980s. Rights to most of its library is currently owned by The Walt Disney Company.

=== Four Star Television ===
Four Star Television, also called Four Star International, is an American television production company. Founded in 1952 as Four Star Productions by prominent Hollywood actors Dick Powell, David Niven, Charles Boyer and Joel McCrea, it was inspired by Lucille Ball and Desi Arnaz founding Desilu Productions a year earlier.

Four Star produced several popular programs in the early days of television, including Four Star Playhouse (its first series), Dick Powell's Zane Grey Theatre, Stagecoach West, The June Allyson Show (also known as The DuPont Show Starring June Allyson), The Dick Powell Show, Burke's Law, The Rogues and The Big Valley.

== See also ==
- Disney Entertainment Television
  - 20th Television Animation
  - ABC Signature
  - Searchlight Television
  - Touchstone Television
  - FX Productions
- Disney Platform Distribution
  - Disney–ABC Domestic Television
- Fox Entertainment
  - Bento Box Entertainment
  - MarVista Entertainment
