= William Caunitz =

American novelist

William J. Caunitz

William J. Caunitz (January 25, 1933 – July 20, 1996) was a New York City Police Department officer who used his own experiences on the police force to write best-selling thrillers. His first novel One Police Plaza was made into a television film starring Robert Conrad. The 1991 feature film Homicide, directed by David Mamet, was adapted from his second book Suspects.

== Biography and career ==
Caunitz was born in Brooklyn and graduated from Erasmus Hall High School. His father was a professional piano player and his mother, a housewife. He served in the United States Marine Corps from 1949 to 1953. After working for an insurance company in New Jersey as a map clerk; in 1955 he joined the NYPD in his twenties. He first worked as a patrolman, and eventually rose through the ranks to become a lieutenant, followed by an assignment as a detective squad commander. He graduated from City College with a bachelor's degree, and in 1972, he earned a master's degree in history from Hofstra University.

After retiring, he planned on becoming a teacher, but after a chance encounter in 1974 at a party with then Harcourt Brace editor Tony Godwin; who inspired him to put his "war stories" on paper, he followed that advice and pursued a career as an author. Caunitz wrote with great authenticity when describing precinct day-to-day life in his novels. The New York Times has compared him to Joseph Wambaugh.

After many rewrites, his first novel One Police Plaza came out in 1984. The curtain-rod murder that opens his debut novel is based on two actual homicide cases Caunitz worked on. It was made into a television film starring Robert Conrad in 1986. In 1988 the film got a sequel, The Red Spider. His second book Suspects, was adapted into the feature film Homicide, directed by David Mamet. His fourth novel Exceptional Clearance was also released as an audiobook on two cassette tapes, and was narrated by Kevin Spacey.

His novels usually center around one or two police officers that follow detailed police procedures to solve a crime, and he also used some sensational elements of thrillers. He did not write with an outline, preferring to let the plot evolve unpredictably as he was writing.

Caunitz died in 1996 from pulmonary fibrosis His last novel, Chains of Command, was half-completed at the time of his death and finished by Christopher Newman.

== Bibliography ==
- One Police Plaza (1984)
- Suspects (1986)
- Black Sand (1989)
- Exceptional Clearance (1991)
- Cleopatra Gold (1993)
- Pigtown (1995)
- Chains of Command (1999)
