= Crackers (1984 film) =

1984 American film by Louis Malle

- Theatrical Poster
- Directed by: Louis Malle
- Written by: Jeffrey Fiskin
- Produced by: Robert Cortes; Edward Lewis
- Starring: Donald Sutherland; Jack Warden; Sean Penn
- Cinematography: László Kovács
- Edited by: Suzanne Baron
- Music by: Paul Chihara; Michael McDonald (theme song "More Than We Need")
- Distributed by: Universal Pictures
- Release date: 17 February 1984
- Running time: 91 minutes
- Country: United States
- Language: English
- Budget: $12 million
- Box office: $129,268

Crackers is a 1984 American comedy-crime film directed by Louis Malle. It was entered into the 34th Berlin International Film Festival.

Written by Jeffrey Fiskin, the film is about a group of small-time out-of-luck thieves, led by the unemployed Weslake (Donald Sutherland), who attempt to rob the neighborhood pawn shop owned by the greedy Garvey (Jack Warden). It is a remake of the Italian film Big Deal on Madonna Street (1958) directed by Mario Monicelli.

== Plot ==
In 1980s San Francisco, Weslake, who was laid off from his job, is working in a low-paying position at Garvey's pawn shop. Weslake has one friend nicknamed "Turtle" who is homeless and is seen throughout the whole film searching for something to eat.

One day, Dillard, who is an amateur musician, and Ramon, an illegal immigrant from Mexico who lives with his sister Maria, come to Garvey's shop. The purpose of their visit is to buy off a guitar pawned earlier by Dillard; because both have little money they're offering the pawn shop owner a stolen car radio, but it is not enough for Garvey. Instead, he offers Dillard a deal: he wants Dillard to install an alarm system in his shop (as Dillard is an electrician). Dillard is not thrilled by the deal but Ramon convinces him, arguing that when the alarm system is installed, Garvey may have enough confidence to leave the shop (he normally stays in it, since he lives there) and they may then get an opportunity to break in and get the guitar back.

Their conversation is heard by "Boardwalk", a pimp who was just left by his girlfriend with his small child. He tells Weslake that he should report the plans of Dillard and Ramon to Garvey, but Weslake realizes that when the new alarm system is installed, Garvey may no longer find it necessary to employ him, and he will be broke again. Because of this Weslake does not inform his employer of the planned robbery, and instead joins Dillard, Ramon, Boardwalk, and Turtle in their attempted robbery. He becomes the brain of the whole operation, designing a plan for breaking into the large safe in the pawn shop.

The opportunity comes very soon, as Garvey announces that he's leaving the shop because of a planned visit to his old mother. The group then puts their plan into action (albeit with many troubles along the way), eventually finding out that the big vault which is supposed to be full of goods is empty, because Garvey was not keeping anything inside it for years. The whole story has a good ending, however. As Garvey is coming back drunk in the middle of the night (since his mother died when he went to see her), he meets the would-be robbers inside his store. Surprisingly, he does not realize that they intended to rob him, and instead is happy that in this sad time he is surrounded by "friends".

== Cast ==
- Donald Sutherland as Weslake
- Jack Warden as Joe Garvey
- Sean Penn as Dillard
- Wallace Shawn as Turtle
- Larry Riley as Boardwalk
- Trinidad Silva as Ramon
- Christine Baranski as Maxine
- Tasia Valenza as Maria
- Edouard DeSoto as Fernando

== Reception ==
Vincent Canby of The New York Times wrote that the film "simply proves that with the right material an intelligent director of demonstrated style and a cast of thoroughly accomplished comic actors can make as painfully witless a comedy as any knucklehead on the block." TV Guide described the film as a "hilarious remake" of Big Deal on Madonna Street.

In a retrospective review for Not Coming to a Theater Near You, Leo Goldsmith described Crackers as an "underdone footnote" in the history of comic heist films. In a career retrospective on Malle, Roger Ebert stated the film "was a comedy that didn't work."

On the review aggregator website Rotten Tomatoes, 0% of 5 critics' reviews are positive, with an average rating of 2/10.
