= 1985–86 United States network television schedule (late night) =

These are the late night schedules on all three networks for each calendar season beginning September 1985. All times are Eastern/Pacific.

Talk/variety shows are highlighted in yellow, network news programs in gold, and local news & programs are highlighted in white background.

== Monday-Friday ==
-		11:00 PM	11:30 PM	12:00 AM	12:30 AM	1:00 AM	1:30 AM	2:00 AM	2:30 AM	3:00 AM	3:30 AM	4:00 AM	4:30 AM	5:00 AM	5:30 AM
ABC	Fall	local programming	ABC News Nightline	Eye on Hollywood (Tue.-Fri.)	Local
ABC	Winter	local programming	ABC News Nightline	Eye on Hollywood	Local
ABC	Summer	local programming	ABC News Nightline	Lifestyles of the Rich and Famous	Local
CBS	Fall	local programming	CBS Late Night / T.J. Hooker (Wed. 11:30-12:30)				local programming	CBS News Nightwatch
CBS	Summer	local programming	CBS Late Night				local programming	CBS News Nightwatch
NBC		local programming	The Tonight Show Starring Johnny Carson		Late Night with David Letterman (Mon.-Thur.)/Friday Night Videos to 2:00 (2:30 in the Spring; Fri)		local programming

== Saturday ==
-	11:00 PM	11:30 PM	12:00 AM	12:30 AM	1:00 AM	1:30 AM	2:00 AM	2:30 AM	3:00 AM	3:30 AM	4:00 AM	4:30 AM	5:00 AM	5:30 AM
NBC	local programming	Saturday Night Live			local programming

== Sunday ==
-	11:00 PM	11:30 PM	12:00 AM	12:30 AM	1:00 AM	1:30 AM	2:00 AM	2:30 AM	3:00 AM	3:30 AM	4:00 AM	4:30 AM	5:00 AM	5:30 AM
NBC	local programming	The George Michael Sports Machine	local programming

== By network ==
=== ABC ===
Returning Series

- Eye on Hollywood
- Nightline

New Series

- Lifestyles of the Rich and Famous (also aired in Daytime)

Not Returning From 1984-85

- ABC Rocks

=== CBS ===
Returning Series

- CBS Late Night
- CBS News Nightwatch
- T.J. Hooker (Moved from ABC, previously a primetime series)

=== NBC ===
Returning Series

- Friday Night Videos
- The George Michael Sports Machine
- Late Night with David Letterman
- Saturday Night Live
- The Tonight Show Starring Johnny Carson
