= WCFC-LP =

- Richmond, Virginia; United States
- Broadcast area: Metro Richmond
- Frequency: 93.7 MHz

Programming
- Format: Religious

Ownership
- Owner: Crusade For Christ Family Worship Church COGIC; (Crusade For Christ Temple Church of God in Christ)

History
- First air date: 2008
- Call sign meaning: Crusade For Christ

Technical information
- Licensing authority: FCC
- Facility ID: 126464
- Class: L1
- ERP: 72 watts
- HAAT: 35.4 meters (116 ft)
- Transmitter coordinates: 37°33′29.0″N 77°27′15.0″W

Links
- Public license information: LMS
- Website: cfcfamily.org

WCFC-LP is a Contemporary Christian formatted broadcast radio station licensed to and serving Richmond, Virginia. WCFC-LP is owned and operated by Crusade For Christ Family Worship Church COGIC.
