= Stir Crazy (TV series) =

American television series

- Genre: Sitcom; Adventure
- Developed by: Larry Tucker; Larry Rosen
- Written by: Michael Russnow
- Directed by: Peter H. Hunt; Christian I. Nyby II
- Starring: Joe Guzaldo; Larry Riley; Marc Silver; Jeannie Wilson
- Opening theme: "Stir It Up"
- Country of origin: United States
- Original language: English
- No. of seasons: 1
- No. of episodes: 8 (1 unaired)

Production
- Producer: David J. Latt
- Running time: 60 min.
- Production companies: Larry/Larry Productions; Columbia Pictures Television

Original release
- Network: CBS
- Release: September 18, 1985 – January 7, 1986

Stir Crazy is an American sitcom that aired on CBS as part of its 1985 fall lineup. Stir Crazy was based on the 1980 film of the same name. The theme song was "Stir It Up" by Patti LaBelle.

== Synopsis ==
It tells the story of two socially awkward friends, Harry Fletcher (Larry Riley) and Skip Harrington (Joseph Guzaldo), who were wrongfully convicted and sentenced to 132 years in prison. While working on a chain gang, they escape and set out after Crawford (Marc Silver), the man who had actually committed the crime for which they had been sentenced. Pursuing them is the aggressive, ruthless, and cold-hearted Captain Betty Phillips (Jeannie Wilson), a female prison guard. "Captain Betty" was an amalgam of "Warden Beatty", the prison guard character played by Barry Corbin in the feature film, whom the boys were on the run from (the movie character's name, in itself, being a spoof of Warren Beatty).

== Critical reception ==
While the movie upon which it was based had been a hit, the television version of Stir Crazy was anything but. None of the people involved in the film had a major role in this series. It was pulled from the CBS fall lineup in October 1985, the month after its premiere, and put on hiatus. It returned in a new time slot in December 1985 and a few more episodes were aired, also to low ratings. The program was permanently cancelled after the January 7, 1986 broadcast.

== Pilot ==
The pilot for the TV series, which aired on September 18, 1985, had Polly Holliday in the role of Captain Betty and Royce D. Applegate as Crawford. Both were promptly dismissed from the roles, ostensibly because of poor testing when CBS executives screened the pilot. The sixtyish Betty turned into the much younger and curvaceous version of the character played by Jeannie Wilson, while Marc Silver's Crawford was also younger and physically different from the version played by Applegate.

== Episode list ==
No.	Title	Directed by	Written by	Original release date
1	"Pilot"	Peter H. Hunt	Bruce Jay Friedman and Larry Tucker & Larry Rosen	September 18, 1985
2	"The Ping Pong Caper"	Unknown	Unknown	September 25, 1985
3	"Welcome to the Tribe"	Unknown	Unknown	October 2, 1985
4	"Magnificent Repossession"	Christian I. Nyby II	Unknown	October 9, 1985
5	"The Football Story"	Unknown	Unknown	October 16, 1985
6	"The Sulky Race"	Rod Amateau	Unknown	October 23, 1985
7	"The Love Affair"	Rod Amateau	Michael Russnow	December 24, 1985
8	"Where's Mary?"	Rod Amateau	Unknown	December 31, 1985
9	"Basic Straining"	Christian I. Nyby II	TBD	1986

== Ratings ==
Note: The "Rating" is not the 18-49 demo but the total rating.

Viewership and ratings per episode of Stir Crazy
No.	Title	Air date	Timeslot (ET)	Rating (18–49)	Viewers (millions)
1	"Pilot"	September 18, 1985	Wednesday 8:00 p.m.	14.4 (#32 of 58)	12.3
2	"The Ping Pong Caper"	September 25, 1985	Wednesday 8:00 p.m.	9.0 (#59 of 64)	7.7
3	"Welcome to the Tribe"	October 2, 1985	Wednesday 8:00 p.m.	10.7 (#59 of 69)	9.2
4	"Magnificent Repossession"	October 9, 1985	Wednesday 8:00 p.m.	13.7 (#44 of 63)	11.7
5	"The Football Story"	October 16, 1985	Wednesday 8:00 p.m.	11.2 (#59 of 67)	9.6
6	"The Sulky race"	October 23, 1985	Wednesday 8:00 p.m.	10.6 (#64 of 66)	9.1
7	"The Love Affair"	December 24, 1985	Tuesday 8:00 p.m.	6.3 (#64 of 66)	5.4
8	"Where's Mary?"	December 18, 1985	Tuesday 8:00 p.m.	8.8 (#60 of 64)	7.6
9	"Basic Training"	N/A	N/A	N/A	N/A

Source: Los Angeles Times
