= Melba (TV series) =

American sitcom

- Genre: Sitcom
- Created by: Barry Harman; Marshall Karp
- Written by: Larry Balmagia; Laurie Gelman
- Directed by: Mel Ferber
- Starring: Melba Moore; Jamilla Perry; Gracie Harrison; Barbara Meek; Lou Jacobi; Evan Mirand
- Opening theme: "We're Sisters" performed by Melba Moore
- Country of origin: United States
- Original language: English
- No. of seasons: 1
- No. of episodes: 6

Production
- Executive producer: Saul Ilson
- Producers: Larry Balmagia; Bob Peete
- Camera setup: Multi-camera
- Running time: 30 minutes
- Production companies: Saul Ilson Productions; Columbia Pictures Television

Original release
- Network: CBS
- Release: January 28 – September 13, 1986

Melba is an American sitcom that aired on CBS from January 28, 1986, until September 13, 1986. The series was a vehicle for singer and actress Melba Moore.

== Summary ==
The show revolved around the home and work life of Melba Patterson (Moore), a divorced mother who was the director of New York's Manhattan Visitors Center. Melba was raising her 9-year-old daughter Tracy (Jamilla Perry) with the help of her mother Rose (Barbara Meek) and her white "sister", Susan Slater (Gracie Harrison). Melba and Susan had been close since childhood, since Rose was Susan's family's housekeeper when they were growing up. Jack (Lou Jacobi) and young Gil (Evan Mirand) worked for Melba at the visitors' center.

The sitcom was supposed to air on Tuesday nights at 8 p.m. alongside Charlie & Co., another Black-oriented sitcom (as well as the Columbia network's answer to The Cosby Show). However, ratings for the first episode were so dismal (partly because it premiered on the same day as the Challenger disaster and the planned State of the Union Address, which was postponed the week after) that the network cancelled it outright. The other five episodes that were produced beforehand would be eventually burned off during the summer of 1986 on Saturday evenings.

== Cast ==
- Melba Moore as Melba Patterson
- Jamilla Perry as Tracy Patterson
- Gracie Harrison as Susan Slater
- Barbara Meek as Mama Rose
- Lou Jacobi as Jack
- Evan Mirand as Gil

== Episodes ==
No.	Title	Directed by	Written by	Original release date
1	"Manhunt"	Mel Ferber	Larry Balmagia & Pam Sweeney	January 28, 1986
2	"Mother and Other Strangers"	Mel Ferber	Laurie Gelman	August 2, 1986
3	"The Triangle"	Unknown	Unknown	August 9, 1986
4	"Mother Knows Best"	Unknown	Unknown	August 16, 1986
5	"My Shadow and Me"	Unknown	Unknown	September 6, 1986
6	"The Girls Are Back in Town"	Unknown	Unknown	September 13, 1986
