= Fortune Dane =

1986 American crime drama television series

- Genre: Drama
- Created by: Ronald M. Cohen
- Directed by: Charles Correll
- Starring: Carl Weathers; Daphne Ashbrook; Joe Dallesandro
- Country of origin: United States
- Original language: English
- No. of seasons: 1
- No. of episodes: 6

Production
- Running time: 60 minutes
- Production companies: Stormy Weathers Productions; The Movie Company Enterprises; The Rosenzweig Company

Original release
- Network: ABC
- Release: February 15 – March 27, 1986

Fortune Dane is an American crime drama series that aired at 9 p.m. Eastern Time on ABC from February 15 to March 27, 1986. It stars Carl Weathers as the title character. It was cancelled after only six episodes, due to low ratings after failing to compete with NBC's The Golden Girls and 227. A few months after the series ended, the series was re-edited as a television movie. As of 2021, the series is available to stream on Crackle.

== Synopsis ==
Fortune Dane is a former policeman who works as a special agent for the mayor in Bay City.

== Cast ==
- Carl Weathers as Detective Fortune Dane
- Daphne Ashbrook as Kathy “Speed" Davenport, Fortune’s aide
- Joe Dallesandro as Tommy "Perfect Tommy" Nicautri, Amanda’s aide
- Penny Fuller as Amanda Harding, Mayor of Bay City, California
- Alberta Watson as Amy Steiner

== Episodes ==
No.	Title	Directed by	Written by	Original release date
1	"Moving Parts"	Nicholas Sgarro	Ronald M. Cohen	February 15, 1986
2	"Bay City"	Charles Correll	Ronald M. Cohen	February 22, 1986
3	"The Tape"	John Patterson	Linda Elstad	March 1, 1986
4	"Sanctuary"	Nicholas Sgarro	Adrian Spies	March 8, 1986
5	"Airport"	Allen Baron	Paul Edwards	March 15, 1986
6	"Jailhouse Blues"	Joel Oliansky	Leo V. Gordon	March 22, 1986
