= Mr. Sunshine (1986 TV series) =

American sitcom

- Genre: Sitcom
- Created by: David Lloyd
- Written by: David Lloyd; Peter Noah; Emily Marshall
- Directed by: John Rich
- Starring: Jeffrey Tambor; Barbara Babcock; Leonard Frey; Cecilia Hart; Nan Martin
- Theme music composer: Randy Edelman
- Country of origin: United States
- Original language: English
- No. of seasons: 1
- No. of episodes: 11

Production
- Executive producers: John Rich; Henry Winkler
- Editor: Marco Zappia
- Running time: 30 min.
- Production companies: Henry Winkler/John Rich Productions; Paramount Television

Original release
- Network: ABC
- Release: March 28 – May 24, 1986

Mr. Sunshine is an American sitcom created by David Lloyd that aired on ABC from March 28 to May 24, 1986. The series was produced by John Rich and Henry Winkler and ran for 11 episodes as a midseason replacement."Mr. Sunshine". TV Guide.

The series starred Jeffrey Tambor as Paul Stark, a blind English professor at a small university, with Barbara Babcock as his landlady and Leonard Frey as a fellow professor. The show received a Humanitas Prize nomination for 30-minute network television in 1986.

The series was controversial during its run, attracting criticism from interest groups claiming that Mr. Sunshine poked fun at the visually impaired by using the lead character's disability as a focus for much of the show's humor. Supporters of the series said the show treated the character and the disability respectfully.

== Cast ==
- Jeffrey Tambor as Paul Stark
- Nan Martin as Grace D'Angelo
- Leonard Frey as Leon Walters
- Cecilia Hart as Janice Hall
- David Knell as Warren Leftwich
- Barbara Babcock as June Swinford

== Episodes ==
No.	Title	Directed by	Written by	Original release date
1	"Pilot"	John Rich	David Lloyd	March 28, 1986
Jeffrey Tambor stars as a blind english professor.
2	"Mrs. Swinford Takes the Plunge"	John Rich	David Lloyd	April 4, 1986
Paul asks a beautiful but antagonistic woman for a date
3	"The Evaluation"	John Rich	Bob Ellison	April 11, 1986
Leon's storm-trooper teaching techniques jeopardize his chances at a fellowship to Oxford.
4	"Strictly Personal"	John Rich	Emily Marshall	April 18, 1986
Paul's landlady, Ms. Swinford, becomes convinced he has fallen for her.
5	"Educating Swinford"	John Rich	Bruce David & Bruce Helford	April 18, 1986
Landlady Swinford becomes convinced that Paul is smitten with her and is sending her secret love signals.
6	"The Theater Calls Grace"	John Rich	David Lloyd	April 25, 1986
Paul goes to great lengths, including getting in a wheelchair, to keep Leon's quickly sinking play afloat.
7	"Too Many Cooks"	John Rich	Peter Noah	May 2, 1986
Paul takes a gourmet kitchen course and becomes overly confident. He invites Janice over for a meal, but his newly-found kitchen skills are not up to the job.
8	"Fear of Falling"	John Rich	Emily Marshall	May 3, 1986
New night and time. Janet and a pretty student vie for Paul's affection.
9	"Leftwich in Love"	John Rich	Peter Noah	May 10, 1986
Bumbling assistant Warren falls in love with a conniver who wants his job.
10	"Great Expectations"	John Rich	David Lloyd	May 17, 1986
A newly received inheritance has Leon doing things that may come back to haunt him. Like throwing a huge party, telling off the Dean of the college and even worse...insulting the dean's wife.
11	"Take My Ex-Wife, Please!"	John Rich	Peter Noah	May 24, 1986
Paul views his ex-wife's pending marriage with mixed emotions
