= Bridges to Cross =

American drama television series

- Genre: Drama
- Created by: Robert W. Lenski; B. T. Brown
- Starring: Suzanne Pleshette; Nicolas Surovy; Roddy McDowall; Eva Gabor; Jose Ferrer
- Composers: Jeff Sturges; Mark Snow
- Country of origin: United States
- Original language: English
- No. of seasons: 1
- No. of episodes: 6 (list of episodes)

Production
- Running time: 60 minutes
- Production companies: Echo Cove Productions; Page One; Lorimar-Telepictures

Original release
- Network: CBS
- Release: April 24 – June 12, 1986

Bridges to Cross is an American drama television series that aired on CBS from April 24 until June 12, 1986.

== Premise ==
Tracy Bridges works alongside her ex-husband for a magazine in Washington, D.C.

== Cast ==
- Suzanne Pleshette as Tracy Bridges
- Nicolas Surovy as Peter Cross
- Roddy McDowall as Norman Parks
- Jose Ferrer as Morris Kane
- Eva Gabor as Maria Talbot
- Nancy Cartwright as Anita Jones

== Episodes ==
No.	Title	Directed by	Written by	Original release date
1	"Yesterday Upon the Stair"	Philip Leacock	William Blinn	April 24, 1986
Tracy finds out that an assignment editor wants to end a story about an 11-year-old from a drug-dealing family.
2	"A Theory of Dark Thunder"	Philip Leacock	William Blinn	May 1, 1986
Peter and Tracy finds out that the death of a porn king involved more than a traffic accident.
3	"Keeper of the Flame"	William F. Claxton	Christopher Beaumont	May 8, 1986
Three of four reporters who wrote about a terrorist group in the '60s have met suspicious deaths. Tracy is the fourth reporter.
4	"Memories of Molly"	Sharron Miller	Michael A. Hoey	May 15, 1986
A bag lady claims to come from a wealthy family, but has been usurped by an imposter.
5	"Take a Cup of Kindness"	William Wiard	Story by : Robert W. Lenski; Teleplay by : William Blinn	May 22, 1986
Tracy and Peter compete for a story about the arrest of an art-gallery owner.
6	"Looks Like Up to Me"	Arthur Allan Seidelman	Robert W. Lenski	June 12, 1986
Peter gets an ex-con as a protege. The ex-con falls in love with Tracy.

== Ratings ==
No.	Title	Air Date	Time	Rank	Rating	Viewers (Millions)
1	"Yesterday Upon the Stair"	April 24, 1986	Thursday at 10:00 P.M.	#18 of 64	14.5	12.4
2	"A Theory of Dark Thunder"	May 1, 1986	Thursday at 9:00 P.M.	#49 of 71	11.4	9.8
3	"Keeper of the Flame"	May 8, 1986	Thursday at 9:00 P.M.	#53 of 65	9.9	8.5
4	"Memories of Molly"	May 15, 1986	Thursday at 9:00 P.M.	#43 of 62	10.9	9.4
5	"Take a Cup of Kindness"	May 22, 1986	Thursday at 9:00 P.M.	#46 of 62	9.8	8.4
6	""Looks Like Up to Me""	June 12, 1986	Thursday at 9:00 P.M.	#39 of 69	10.5	9.0

Source: A.C. Nielsen Company via Los Angeles Times
