= He's the Mayor =

American sitcom

- Created by: Winston Moss; Bob Peete
- Developed by: Sandy Veith
- Starring: Kevin Hooks; Al Fann; David Graf; Wesley Thompson; Margot Rose; Stanley Brock; Pat Corley
- Country of origin: United States
- Original language: English
- No. of seasons: 1
- No. of episodes: 13 (3 unaired)

Production
- Executive producer: Sandy Veith
- Running time: 30 minutes
- Production company: Universal Television

Original release
- Network: ABC
- Release: January 10 – March 21, 1986

He's the Mayor is an American sitcom that aired on ABC from January 10 to March 21, 1986. It stars Kevin Hooks as a 25-year-old man who is elected mayor of his hometown.

== Cast and characters ==
- Kevin Hooks as Mayor Carl Burke
- Al Fann as Alvin Burke, Carl's father
- David Graf as Councilman Harlan Nash
- Wesley Thompson as Wardell Halsey
- Margot Rose as Kelly Enright
- Stanley Brock as Ivan Bronski
- Pat Corley as Chief Walter Padget

== Episodes ==
No.	Title	Original release date	Prod. code
1	"The Honeymoon's Over"	January 10, 1986	61000
Having won election as mayor, 25-year-old Carl Burke discovers that the job is not as easy as he believed.
2	"Take My Father, Please"	January 17, 1986	61009
Carl tries to play matchmaker for his father with little success.
3	"The Mayor's Best Friend"	January 24, 1986	61004
Carl befriends a stray dog and becomes concerned for the city's unwanted animals.
4	"An Officer and the Mayor"	January 31, 1986	61001
Carl romances a beautiful Navy liaison officer (Vanessa L. Williams).
5	"My Dad, the Grad"	February 7, 1986	61011
In order to get a new job, Alvin must earn his high school diploma.
6	"The New and Improved Mayor"	February 21, 1986	61013
Carl pretends to be someone else.
7	"Burke's Acres"	February 28, 1986	61008
Alvin is bribed to prevent him from giving a eulogy.
8	"Take This Job and Shove It"	March 7, 1986	61016
Tired of serving as Carl's chauffeur, Wardell quits.
9	"Early Retirement"	March 14, 1986	61005
Carl offers his employees early retirement.
10	"Dinner for Two"	March 21, 1986	61012
11	"Mayors, Don't Let Your Uncles Grow Up to Be Cowboys"	Unaired	61017
12	"Heart and Soul"	Unaired	61019
13	"And That's the Way It Was"	Unaired	61020
