= Fathers and Sons (1986 TV series) =

American sitcom television series

- Genre: Sitcom
- Created by: Nick Arnold; Michael Zinberg
- Starring: Merlin Olsen; Nicholas Guest
- Composer: Patrick Williams
- Country of origin: United States
- Original language: English
- No. of seasons: 1
- No. of episodes: 4

Production
- Camera setup: Multi-camera
- Running time: 30 minutes
- Production companies: American Flyer Television Ltd. 20th Century Fox Television

Original release
- Network: NBC
- Release: April 6 – May 4, 1986

Fathers and Sons is an American sitcom television series created by Nick Arnold and Michael Zinberg, that aired on NBC from April 6 until May 4, 1986.

== Premise ==
Merlin Olsen played a father who was also a baseball coach for his sons.

== Cast ==
- Merlin Olsen as Buddy Landau
- Jason Late as Lanny Landau
- Kelly Sanders as Ellen Landau
- Andre Gower as Sean Flynn
- Ina Fried as Matty Bolen
- Nicholas Guest as Dr. Richard Bolen
- Hakeem as Brandon Russo

== Episodes ==
No.	Title	Directed by	Written by	Original release date
1	"The Ironman"	Michael Zinberg	Nick Arnold	April 6, 1986
Buddy asks for help from a professional wrestler in order to encourage a handicapped student to join the wrestling team.
2	"We'll Always Have the Mall"	Will Mackenzie	Nick Arnold	April 13, 1986
Lanny has a date with the girl of his dreams on the same day he plans to attend a basketball game with his dad.
3	"Desperately Seeking Einstein"	Robert McCullough	Michael Zinberg, Randall Zisk	April 27, 1986
Sean's father is of no help with the project for the father-son science fair.
4	"Which Championship Season?"	Peter Baldwin	Nick Arnold	May 4, 1986
Buddy's old friends doesn't agree with his tactics for turning his sons basketball team into a winning team.
