= The Last Precinct =

American television sitcom - 1986

- publicity shot of cast
- Genre: Comedy-drama; Police procedural
- Created by: Stephen J. Cannell; Frank Lupo
- Directed by: Hy Averback; Michael Lange
- Starring: (See article)
- Composers: Mike Post (1.1); Pete Carpenter (1.1)
- Country of origin: United States
- Original language: English
- No. of seasons: 1
- No. of episodes: 8

Production
- Executive producer: Stephen J. Cannell
- Running time: 60 minutes
- Production company: Stephen J. Cannell Productions

Original release
- Network: NBC
- Release: January 26 – May 30, 1986

The Last Precinct is an American police comedy-drama television series that ran for 7 episodes, premiering on NBC on January 26, and then airing weekly from April 11 to May 30, 1986, on Friday nights at 9:00pm. The series starred Adam West as Capt. Rick Wright, leading a group of misfit police academy rejects. The pilot for the Stephen J. Cannell series debuted after Super Bowl XX in 1986, but the show was canceled within two months of its April premiere. This was the only sitcom from Stephen J. Cannell Productions.

== Cast ==
- Adam West as Capt. Rick Wright
- Rick Ducommun as Officer William "Raid" Raider
- Ernie Hudson as Sgt. "Night Train" Lane
- Randi Brooks as Officer Mel Brubaker
- Vijay Amritraj as Alphabet
- Pete Willcox as The King
- Keenan Wynn as Butch
- Hank Rolike as Sundance
- Jonathan Perpich as Sgt. Price Pascall
- Lucy Lee Flippin as Officer Rina Starland
- Wings Hauser as Lt. Ronald Hobbs
- Yana Nirvana as Sgt. Martha Haggerty
- Geoffrey Elliot as Justin Dial
- James Cromwell as Chief Bludhorn
- Thomas F. Duffy as Harvey
- Nicholas Kadi as Norton

== Episodes ==
| No. | Title | Directed by | Written by | Original release date |
|---|---|---|---|---|
| TVM | "Pilot" | Hy Averback | Frank Lupo & Stephen J. Cannell | January 26, 1986 |
| 1 | "The Gorilla-Gram" | Michael Lange | Frank Lupo | April 11, 1986 |
| 2 | "Mr. Cool" | Michael Lange | Robert Goethals | April 18, 1986 |
| 3 | "I Want My Mummy" | Bob Sweeney | Paul Bernbaum | April 25, 1986 |
| 4 | "Never Cross a Vampire" | Michael Lange | Paul Bernbaum | May 2, 1986 |
| 5 | "A Ghost of a Chance" | Bruce Kessler | Frank Lupo | May 9, 1986 |
| 6 | "Toehold" | David Hemmings | Jim Mulligan | May 16, 1986 |
| 7 | "Three-Ring Circus" | Michael Lange | Paul Bernbaum & Robert Goethals & Jim Mulligan | May 30, 1986 |
