= Charlie & Co. =

American sitcom

- the cast of Charlie & Co. as pictured in the 1985 TV Guide Fall Preview issue
- Also known as: Charlie & Company
- Genre: Sitcom
- Created by: Allan Katz
- Starring: Flip Wilson; Gladys Knight; Kristoff St. John; Fran Robinson; Jaleel White; Della Reese
- Theme music composer: Merald "Bubba" Knight; Gladys Knight; Sam Dees
- Opening theme: "Family", performed by Gladys Knight
- Composer: Perry Botkin Jr.
- Country of origin: United States
- Original language: English
- No. of seasons: 1
- No. of episodes: 18 (1 unaired)

Production
- Production locations: ABC Television Center, Los Angeles, California
- Running time: 30 minutes
- Production companies: Allan Katz Productions; Bob Henry Productions; 20th Century Fox Television

Original release
- Network: CBS
- Release: September 18, 1985 – May 16, 1986

Charlie & Co. (also known as Charlie & Company) is an American television sitcom that originally aired on CBS from September 18, 1985, to May 16, 1986. Created by Allan Katz, the series stars Flip Wilson and Gladys Knight. Charlie & Co. is regarded as CBS's answer to The Cosby Show, which was a ratings success for NBC at the time. Unlike The Cosby Show, which ran for eight seasons, Charlie & Co. lasted only one.

== Synopsis ==
The series follows a middle-class African American family who lived on the South Side of Chicago.

Charlie Richmond (Flip Wilson) is a black middle-class employee of the Division of Highways, who juggles his work and home life with his wife, Diana, a schoolteacher played by Gladys Knight. The couple has three children: sixteen-year-old "Junior" (Kristoff St. John), fifteen-year-old Lauren (Fran Robinson), and nine-year-old Robert (Jaleel White). Della Reese joined the cast during the latter half of the show's only season as Charlie's sister-in-law, Aunt Rachel.

CBS cancelled the series in May 1986.

== Cast ==
- Flip Wilson as Charles "Charlie" Richmond
- Gladys Knight as Diana Richmond
- Kristoff St. John as Charlie "Junior" Richmond Jr.
- Fran Robinson as Lauren Richmond
- Jaleel White as Robert Richmond
- Della Reese as Aunt Rachel
- Ray Girardin as Walter Simpson
- Richard Karron as Milton Bieberman
- Kip King as Ronald Sandler
- Terence McGovern as Jim Coyle
- Eddie Velez as Miguel Santana
- Heidi Levine as Emily Coyle

== Episodes ==
No.	Title	Directed by	Written by	Original release date	Prod. code
1	"Pilot"	Alan Rafkin	Allan Katz	September 18, 1985	6S79
Charlie is asked by Junior to speak at Career Day at his school. All is well until Charlie freezes up with a case of stage fright. Recording date: April 4, 1985
2	"Easy for You to Say"	Alan Rafkin	Michael Kagan	September 25, 1985	6S01
Charlie faces difficult tasks on the home front: he has to cancel the family's camping trip due to work—and Lauren wants to discuss sex. Recording date: August 13, 1985
3	"Muggers or Us"	Alan Rafkin	Bill Richmond	October 2, 1985	6S03
Charlie wants Diana to transfer to another school after there's an incident of vandalism at her school.
4	"Buddy, Can You Spare My Dime?"	Alan Rafkin	Gary Gilbert	October 9, 1985	6S02
Charlie struggles to find the nerve to ask for the money his boss owes him, while the family struggles through Diana's nutrition campaign.
5	"The World According to Jim"	Alan Rafkin	Michael Kagan	October 16, 1985	6S05
Charlie and Diana soon regret letting Charlie's co-worker move in during his marital spat. Recording date: September 17, 1985
6	"Like Father, Like Son"	Alan Rafkin	Monty Aidem and Gary Murphy	October 23, 1985	6S06
Junior is sorely taxed by Charlie's sudden desire to be more of a pal than a father.
7	"Will Be Around"	Alan Rafkin	Gary Gilbert	October 30, 1985	6S07
The children are upset when Charlie talks of making out a will following a brush with death. Recording date: October 8, 1985
8	"Operation Richmond"	Alan Rafkin	Gary Ferrier and Aubrey Tadman	November 6, 1985	6S08
Just after the family decides to cut back on expenses, Charlie has to go in to the hospital for an operation.
9	"Happy Anniversary... Sort Of"	Alan Rafkin	Allan Katz	November 13, 1985	6S09
Charlie's behavior at a faculty party he and Diana attend threatens the celebration of their 20th anniversary.
10	"For the Love of Lauren"	Alan Rafkin	Bill Richmond	November 27, 1985	6S10
A jilted Lauren thinks all men are jerks, until she attends a concert with a consoling Miguel, the ladies' man of Charlie's office.
11	"Who's Watching the Roads?"	Alan Rafkin	Bill Richmond	December 4, 1985	6S04
Charlie's co-workers plan to take full advantage of their boss's absence, despite the fact that he left Charlie in charge. Recording date: September 10, 1985
12	"Silent Knight"	Alan Rafkin	Gary Gilbert	December 11, 1985	6S12
Charlie's looking forward to spending Christmas with his family, but Junior and Lauren have other ideas.
13	"Beaus and Arrows"	Alan Rafkin	Story by : Allan Katz; Teleplay by : Michael Kagan	December 25, 1985	6S11
Diana's old college boyfriend returns. Recording date: November 12, 1985
14	"Here's Rachel"	Alan Rafkin	Allan Katz	January 28, 1986	6S14
Della Reese joins the cast as Aunt Rachel.
15	"Rachel and the Stranger"	Alan Rafkin	Liz Sage	April 25, 1986	6S17
After a burglary, Aunt Rachel is too scared to return alone to her apartment, so Diana volunteers Charlie to stay overnight with her.
16	"When You Least Expect It"	Alan Rafkin	Gary Gilbert	May 2, 1986	6S16
The family knows that Diana has something on her mind, but she won't talk until she's sure—that she's pregnant.
17	"Don't Take My Son... Please"	Alan Rafkin	Bill Richmond	May 9, 1986	6S15
Bored with school, Junior decides to join the Army.
18	"Rent and Rave"	Alan Rafkin	Gary Ferrier and Aubrey Tadman	May 16, 1986	6S13
The Richmonds face a rent increase.

== Awards and nominations ==
Year	Award	Result	Category	Recipient
1986	Young Artist Awards	Nominated	Best Young Supporting Actor in a New Television Series	Jaleel White
1986	Young Artist Awards	Nominated	Best Young Actress Starring in a New Television Series	Fran Robinson
1986	Young Artist Awards	Nominated	Best Young Actor Starring in a New Television Series	Kristoff St. John
1986	Young Artist Awards	Nominated	Best New Television Series - Comedy or Drama	-

== Ratings ==
Note: The "Rating" is not the 18-49 demo but the total rating.

Viewership and ratings per episode of Charlie & Co.
No.	Title	Air date	Timeslot (ET)	Rating (18–49)	Viewers (millions)
1	"Pilot"	September 18, 1985	Wednesday 9:00 p.m.	16.1 (#19)	13.80
2	"Easy for You to Say"	September 25, 1985	Wednesday 9:00 p.m.	10.5 (#57)	9.01
3	"Muggers or Us"	October 02, 1985	Wednesday 9:00 p.m.	12.0 (#55)	10.3
4	"Buddy, Can You Spare My Dime"	October 09, 1985	Wednesday 9:00 p.m.	14.2 (#42)	12.2
5	"The World According to Jim"	October 16, 1985	Wednesday 9:00 p.m.	12.2 (#56)	10.5
6	"Like Father, Like Son"	October 23, 1985	Wednesday 9:00 p.m.	11.5 (#58)	9.9
7	"Will Be Around"	October 30, 1985	Wednesday 9:00 p.m.	11.9 (#62)	10.2
8	"Operation Richmond"	November 6, 1985	Wednesday 9:00 p.m.	13.6 (#49)	11.7
9	"Happy Anniversary... Sort Of"	November 13, 1985	Wednesday 9:00 p.m.	11.9 (#56)	10.2
10	"For the Love of Lauren"	November 27, 1985	Wednesday 9:00 p.m.	11.8 (#58)	10.1
11	"Who's Watching the Roads"	December 04, 1985	Wednesday 9:00 p.m.	10.1 (#64)	8.7
12	"Silent Knight"	December 11, 1985	Wednesday 9:00 p.m.	11.8 (#58)	10.1
13	"Beaus and Arrows"	December 25, 1985	Wednesday 9:00 p.m.	11.1 (#55)	9.5
14	"Here's Rachel"	January 28, 1986	Tuesday 8:30 p.m.	8.2 (#64)	7.0
15	"Rachel and the Stranger"	April 25, 1986	Friday 8:00 p.m.	10.0 (#48)	8.5
16	"When You Least Expect It"	May 2, 1986	Friday 8:00 p.m.	9.1 (#62)	7.8
17	"Don't Take My Son... Please"	May 9, 1986	Friday 8:00 p.m.	8.1 (#58)	7.0
18	"Rent and Rave"	May 16, 1986	Friday 8:00 p.m.	8.7 (#57)	7.5

Source: Los Angeles Times
