= List of Benson episodes =

This is a list of episodes in the ABC television series Benson.

== Series overview ==
Season	Episodes	Originally released		Rank	Rating
Season	Episodes	First released	Last released	Rank	Rating
1	24	September 13, 1979	May 8, 1980	23	20.6
2	22	October 31, 1980	May 22, 1981	59	16.4
3	22	November 6, 1981	May 14, 1982	63	—N/a
4	22	October 22, 1982	March 31, 1983	43	—N/a
5	22	September 16, 1983	May 4, 1984	39	16.3
6	24	September 21, 1984	April 5, 1985	33	15.5
7	22	October 4, 1985	April 19, 1986	74	10.0

== Broadcast history ==
Season	Time slot
1 (1979–1980)	Thursdays at 8:30–9:00 pm ET on ABC
2 (1980–1981)	Fridays at 8:00–8:30 pm ET on ABC
3 (1981–1982)	Fridays at 8:00–8:30 pm ET on ABC
4 (1982–1983)	Fridays at 8:00–8:30 pm ET on ABC (October 22, 1982 – March 25, 1983); Thursday at 8:00–8:30 pm ET on ABC (March 31, 1983 - April 27, 1983))
5 (1983–1984)	Fridays at 8:00–8:30 pm ET on ABC
6 (1984–1985)	Fridays at 8:00–8:30 pm ET on ABC (September 21, 1984 – February 22, 1985); Fridays at 9:00–9:30 pm ET on ABC (March 15 – April 5, 1985)
7 (1985–1986)	Fridays at 9:30–10:00 pm ET on ABC (October 4, 1985 – January 3, 1986); Saturdays at 8:30–9:00 pm ET on ABC (January 18 – April 19, 1986)

== Episodes ==
=== Season 1 (1979–80) ===
No. overall	No. in season	Title	Directed by	Written by	Original release date
1	1	"Pilot"	Jay Sandrich	Susan Harris	September 13, 1979
Benson DuBois, butler to Jessica Tate (from Soap), becomes temporary "director of household affairs" for her cousin, Governor Gene Gatling. Benson negotiates a compromise between supporters of bridge construction and beaver preservation. His success lands him a trial offer to be the governor's permanent aide. David Hedison guest stars.
2	2	"Trust Me"	Peter Baldwin	T : Tom Reeder; S/T : Lee Maddux	September 20, 1979
Katie sneaks away to a rock concert over her father's objections, and Benson, who'd been assigned to enforce the prohibition, prepares to resign his position. René Enríquez guest stars.
3	3	"The President's Double"	Jay Sandrich	Tom Reeder	September 27, 1979
When the life of a visiting African president is threatened by radicals from his own country, Benson is persuaded to impersonate him at a state dinner.
4	4	"Benson in Love"	Peter Baldwin	Bob Colleary	October 4, 1979
Benson meets the attractive Francine Wade (Beverly Todd) in the waiting room of the mansion and asks her out, not knowing she is a state senator.
5	5	"Conflict of Interest"	Jay Sandrich	Paul Wayne	October 18, 1979
The Governor faces a conflict between his duties as a father and his duties as a governor: an important invitation to Washington by the President comes up the same night that Gatling had promised Katie he would attend her school play.
6	6	"The Layoff"	Peter Baldwin	Bob Colleary	October 25, 1979
After Governor Gatling embarks on a budget-cutting campaign, Benson must decide which staff members to lay off. Katie resents Benson when he selects the sweet, elderly pastry chef who brightens up everyone's day. Meg Wylie guest stars.
7	7	"Snowbound"	Jay Sandrich	Susan Harris and Stu Silver	November 1, 1979
Governor Gatling wants the staff to join him on his retreat to a mountain cabin, and Benson agrees to come when he learns that Kraus can not attend. Then Kraus comes after all, and, to make matters worse, the staff gets snowed in.
8	8	"Jessica"	Jay Sandrich	Bob Colleary and Tom Reeder	November 8, 1979
Jessica Tate (Katherine Helmond) visits and begins dating the elderly French Baron d'Arvenaux. When the baron dies in Jessica's hotel room and Jessica calls on Benson for help, drastic action is needed to avert a potential scandal.
9	9	"Don't Quote Me"	Peter Baldwin	Tom Reeder	November 22, 1979
A scandalous remark by the Governor about a state senator is printed, endangering the governor's administration and causing everyone on the staff to suspect each other of being the leak. When Katie is determined to be the culprit, she gets a spanking.
10	10	"War Stories"	Jay Sandrich	Michael Weinberger	November 29, 1979
Benson introduces an old army buddy (Mark Goddard) to single Marcy, not knowing the man is married.
11	11	"Ghost Story"	Tony Mordente	Rick McCurdy and Jeff Levin	December 6, 1979
The mansion is haunted by a nineteenth-century governor who was murdered (perhaps by his successor).
12	12	"Taylor's Bid"	John Bowab	Rick McCurdy and Jeff Levin	December 13, 1979
Taylor decides to resign his position as adviser in order to run for public office.
13	13	"One Strike, You're Out"	Jay Sandrich	Warren S. Murray	December 27, 1979
The domestic workers at the mansion go on strike, threatening a high-level dinner.
14	14	"Just Friends"	John Bowab	Bob Colleary	January 3, 1980
Governor Gatling works to persuade entrepreneur Howard Walker to settle his new factory in his state, causing discomfort for Benson, who once romanced the man's wife. Roscoe Lee Browne and Denise Nicholas guest star.
15	15	"Chain of Command"	Asaad Kelada	Tom Reeder	January 10, 1980
During the governor's illness, the slimy lieutenant governor (David Ruprecht), hoping to take Gatling's place permanently, advances a bill that Gatling opposes. Benson must come to the rescue.
16	16	"Bugging the Governor"	Asaad Kelada	Bernard Dilbert	January 24, 1980
Someone is bugging the mansion. Joel Brooks guest stars.
17	17	"Kraus Affair"	Tony Mordente	T : Rick McCurdy and Jeff Levin; S : Mitch Markowitz	January 31, 1980
Kraus falls for the butcher, but she lacks the self-confidence to ask him out.
18	18	"Checkmate"	Tony Mordente	T : Bob Colleary and Tom Reeder; S : Mark Barkan and Louis Coppola	February 7, 1980
As part of a chess tour, eleven-year-old Soviet chess prodigy Alexei (Meeno Peluce), is brought to the mansion for a multiplayer tournament. During a scuffle, homesick Alexei sneaks away from the tournament, and hides in Katie's room. He implores Katie to say nothing to anyone, and she brings him various food she sneaks out of Kraus' kitchen. When the Soviets can't find him, they threaten war if the boy is not returned.
19	19	"Cold Storage"	John Bowab	Jim Tisdale	February 28, 1980
Benson and Kraus get locked in the basement together.
20	20	"Old Man Gatlin'"	John Bowab	Rick McCurdy and Jeff Levin	March 6, 1980
The Governor's loudmouthed father (David Huddleston) comes to visit and wreaks havoc among the staff.
21	21	"Power Play"	John Tracy	Rick McCurdy and Jeff Levin	March 20, 1980
A load of dead fish and sludge is delivered to the mansion by El Gato (Steven Peterman), a conservationist.
22	22	"Takin' It to the Streets"	Tony Mordente	Shelley Zellman & Wally Dalton	March 27, 1980
Wanting to know how the "little people" really feel, Governor Gatling makes an incognito visit to a grungy local bar, along with a reluctant Benson, to mix with the constituents. Joy Garrett and Kene Holliday guest star.
23	23	"The Army Wants You"	Tony Mordente	Paul Raley	May 1, 1980
With almost everybody else in the mansion down with the flu, Benson learns that while in the Army he may have been part of an experiment in germ warfare without his knowledge. Jack Dodson guest stars.
24	24	"Marcy's Vacation"	Don Barnhart	Kathy Speer & Terry Grossman	May 8, 1980
Going on vacation, Marcy worries that her replacement may do a better job than she and retain the position permanently. Note: Final appearance of Lewis J. Stadlen.

=== Season 2 (1980–81) ===
No. overall	No. in season	Title	Directed by	Written by	Original release date
25	1	"Thick as Thieves"	John Rich	Bob Fraser & Rob Dames	October 31, 1980
Benson and Kraus are held hostage during a market robbery. Clyde Kusatsu guest stars. Note: First appearances of Ethan Phillips and René Auberjonois
26	2	"Benson in the Hospital"	John Rich	Rich Reinhart	November 7, 1980
Benson has a strange malady that has all the doctors puzzled.
27	3	"Fool's Gold"	John Rich	Tom Whedon and Bob Colleary	November 14, 1980
Benson's discovery of an old letter suggesting hidden treasure somewhere in the mansion leads to gold fever among the governor's staff. Note: Jerry Seinfeld makes the first of his three appearances on Benson.
28	4	"Masquerade"	John Rich	Rick McCurdy and Jeff Levin	November 21, 1980
A group of revolutionaries seeks to steal a statue from the mansion.
29	5	"First Lady"	John Rich	Kathy Speer & Terry Grossman	November 28, 1980
Katie is jealous when her father gives special attention to a very important hostess whom he calls Pretty Lily, and Benson must deal with a broken air conditioning system. Barbara Babcock and Warren Munson guest star.
30	6	"Citizen Kraus"	John Rich	Bud Slocomb & Len Riley	December 12, 1980
Gretchen wants to become an American citizen, but, despite a lot of studying, she fails the test due to nervousness. Note: Second of three appearances by Jerry Seinfeld.
31	7	"Benson's Groupie"	John Rich	Bob Colleary	December 19, 1980
Benson's spoiled and self-centered vacation romance follows him home refusing to take no for an answer at the same time important religious leaders are visiting the mansion. Note: Last of three appearances by Jerry Seinfeld.
32	8	"In High Places"	John Rich	Bob Fraser & Rob Dames	January 9, 1981
The pilot of the Governor's charter plane suffers a heart attack and there is no co-pilot, so the Governor has to fly the plane himself.
33	9	"Old School Ties"	John Rich	Bob Fraser & Rob Dames	January 16, 1981
Libby, the Governor's sister, thinks that Katie should be sent to a boarding school. The staff is crushed when the Governor takes his sister's advice.
34	10	"The Apartment"	John Rich	Kathy Speer & Terry Grossman	January 23, 1981
Wanting some privacy, Benson rents an apartment, but despite his efforts everybody manages to intrude.
35	11	"Big Buddy"	John Rich	Tom Whedon and Bob Colleary	February 6, 1981
Press secretary Pete hatches a new scheme to give the Governor good publicity and involves Benson in a "Big Buddy" program.
36	12	"Fireside Chat"	John Rich	Tom Whedon	February 13, 1981
The Governor is scheduled to be on television for a "fireside chat", but a lover's quarrel between Marcy and Dan (the telecast's producer) bleeds through and ruins the telecast.
37	13	"Marcy's Wedding"	John Rich	Bob Colleary	February 20, 1981
Marcy is marrying Dan (Ted Danson) and Benson is responsible for the wedding plans. But Marcy's mother intrudes and disrupts all the arrangements.
38	14	"Rivals"	John Rich	Kathy Speer & Terry Grossman	February 27, 1981
Kraus's childhood rival visits from Germany, expecting to find her married to the governor.
39	15	"No Sad Songs"	John Rich	Bob Fraser & Rob Dames	March 6, 1981
Benson's mother (Beah Richards) comes for a visit and charms everybody, but an unexpected event sadly cuts her stay short.
40	16	"Clayton, Go Home"	John Rich	Tom Whedon and Bob Colleary	March 13, 1981
When Clayton plans to testify against an airline that tried to bribe him, he starts receiving mysterious death threats, so he tries to escape by moving into the mansion.
41	17	"Easy Kid Stuff"	John Rich	Bob Fraser & Rob Dames	March 20, 1981
After a boy falls out of a tree and breaks his arm, Benson has conflicting feelings about becoming the boy's father figure.
42	18	"Homework"	John Rich	Kathy Speer & Terry Grossman	April 3, 1981
Katie is supposed to write a school paper on her family. She writes about her father the Governor, Marcy, Clayton, Pete, Kraus, and Benson.
43	19	"Handwriting on the Wall"	John Rich	Rich Reinhart	April 10, 1981
A controversial environmental bill brings the governor strange threats. Benson begins an investigation as to the source of the letters, but the culprit may be someone in the mansion.
44	20	"The Governor's House Call"	John Rich	Tom Whedon and Bob Colleary	May 8, 1981
The Governor, Benson and Clayton are trapped in a bordello with a muckraking columnist.
45	21	"All Shook Up"	John Rich	Bob Fraser & Rob Dames	May 15, 1981
An earthquake occurs and the Governor and staff work to rescue Benson and Clayton, who are stuck in the cellar.
46	22	"Lifesaver"	John Rich	Rich Reinhart	May 22, 1981
Benson saves Kraus's life but wonders if he did the right thing when her appreciation goes way too far.

=== Season 3 (1981–82) ===
No. overall	No. in season	Title	Directed by	Written by	Original release date
47	1	"Benson's Appointment"	John Rich	Norman Barasch and Bob Colleary	November 6, 1981
When the state budget director unexpectedly dies, the Governor wants to appoint Benson to the job, but a State Senator is determined to block the confirmation. Dana Elcar guest stars.
48	2	"The Grass Ain't Greener"	John Rich	Bob Fraser & Rob Dames	November 13, 1981
Benson goes undercover to investigate conditions in a prison. Don Calfa, Bill Duke, and Brion James guest star.
49	3	"Sit-In"	John Rich	Rich Reinhart	November 27, 1981
It's Marcy's last day working with Benson before she moves away, and in Benson's office a conductor (Ivor Francis) holds a concert in protest of the musicians' plight while Benson is holding interviews for a new secretary. Didi Conn guest stars as Denise Johnson. Note: Final appearance of Marcy (Caroline McWilliams)
50	4	"Double Exposure"	John Rich	Kathy Speer & Terry Grossman	December 4, 1981
While he, the Governor, Clayton and Pete are in Washington D.C. on official business, Benson helps an FBI agent uncover a bribery scheme. Didi Conn's first appearance as a regular cast member.
51	5	"The Lobbyist"	John Rich	T : Bob Fraser & Rob Dames; S : Doug Keyes & Chip Keyes	December 11, 1981
Benson's lobbyist girlfriend approaches Benson with a project he approves, but the project brings charges of corruption against Benson.
52	6	"Stress"	John Rich	Michael J. Weithorn and Bob Fraser & Rob Dames	December 18, 1981
After a day when everyone gets mad at Benson, the Governor holds an encounter session with the staff.
53	7	"Rainbow's End"	John Rich	Russ Woody	December 25, 1981
Benson learns that his old flame (Rosalind Cash) is now a wheelchair user; Clayton is trying to celebrate his birthday.
54	8	"Once in a Blue Moon"	John Rich	Bob Fraser & Rob Dames	January 8, 1982
Clayton is assaulted and Benson approves tighter security at his expense.
55	9	"Kraus Falls in Love"	John Rich	Korby Siamis	January 15, 1982
Kraus starts dating a married man, who lies to her.
56	10	"Stocks & Options"	John Rich	Kathy Speer & Terry Grossman	January 22, 1982
Trouble ensues after Benson accepts some stock from Pete as a debt payment.
57	11	"Kraus's Deadly Mistake"	John Rich	Rich Reinhart	February 5, 1982
Kraus tries to live life to the absolute fullest after she gets the idea that she only has six months to live.
58	12	"Sweet Irish Rose"	John Rich	Bob Fraser & Rob Dames	February 12, 1982
Former Governor Mulligan pays his successor a visit, bringing his attractive niece, whom the Governor and Clayton both fall in love with.
59	13	"Street Gangs"	John Rich	David Langston Smyrl	February 19, 1982
Benson tries to help a street gang stay out of trouble by suggesting they bid for a job with the city.
60	14	"Katie's Romance"	Linda Day	David Langston Smyrl	February 26, 1982
Katie starts to have romantic feelings for Pete after he accompanies her to a gymnastics meet.
61	15	"Clayton's Condo"	John Rich	Rich Reinhart	March 5, 1982
Benson finds out that Clayton owns his apartment building and Clayton will do anything to avoid repairs.
62	16	"Getting Even"	John Rich	Ralph Phillips	March 12, 1982
A wealthy investor pressures Denise for sexual favors.
63	17	"Pete the Hero"	John Rich	T : Bob Fraser & Rob Dames; S : Russ Woody	March 19, 1982
Pete damages a car he borrowed from Benson to stop a robbery.
64	18	"In the Red"	John Rich	Bob Fraser & Rob Dames	March 26, 1982
Benson has his tax records stolen just days before his audit with the IRS. Scatman Crothers guest stars.
65	19	"Teed Off"	John Rich	Kathy Speer & Terry Grossman	April 2, 1982
Benson, the Governor, Clayton, and Pete are at each other's throats after playing a round of golf together.
66	20	"The Party's Over"	John Rich	Rich Reinhart	April 30, 1982
The Governor learns a lot about dirty politics when his party won't support his renomination. Percy Rodriguez guest stars. First episode of a 3-parter.
67	21	"The Lumber Mill"	John Rich	Kathy Speer & Terry Grossman	May 7, 1982
After visiting his old lumber mill, the Governor decides to run for re-election as an independent. Second episode of a 3-parter.
68	22	"Black Tuesday"	John Rich	Bob Fraser & Rob Dames	May 14, 1982
The Governor's campaign comes to a hectic close: he appears to have lost. Concluding episode of a 3-parter.

=== Season 4 (1982–83) ===
No. overall	No. in season	Title	Directed by	Written by	Original release date
69	1	"Death in a Funny Position"	Bill Foster	Bob Fraser & Rob Dames	October 22, 1982
70	2	"Death in a Funny Position"	Bill Foster	Bob Fraser & Rob Dames	October 22, 1982
A yacht cruise becomes a murder mystery when the owner of the boat is stabbed to death. More murders are committed on the yacht, but Benson manages to catch the killer and save the day. Ron Carey, Michael Constantine, Lynda Day George, Tab Hunter, and Keene Curtis guest star.
71	3	"What a Revoltin' Development"	Bill Foster	Kathy Speer & Terry Grossman	October 29, 1982
While attending a conference in Latin America, Benson and Pete are kidnapped by revolutionaries.
72	4	"Thy Brother's Keeper"	Tony Singletary	Bob Fraser & Rob Dames	November 5, 1982
Benson's younger brother (Tim Reid) visits him at the same time an important report is due.
73	5	"Quest for Retire"	Bill Foster	Ralph Phillips	November 12, 1982
Charlie, the mansion's gardener, seeks Benson's help to avoid mandatory retirement. Danny Thomas guest stars.
74	6	"Teacher's Pest"	Bill Foster	Richard Vaczy and Don Hart	November 19, 1982
Kraus must pass an economics test to keep her job. When she finds out that Benson is going to be her teacher, she thinks that it's hopeless.
75	7	"Benson's Army Reunion"	Bill Foster	Ralph Phillips	November 26, 1982
Benson holds an army reunion. Envy surfaces when Kim, a Korean kid the group befriended during the war, turns out to have become a multi-millionaire.
76	8	"Benson's New Home"	Bill Foster	Bob Colleary	December 3, 1982
Benson buys a house from a shady salesman and tries to get him to renovate it. Barney Martin guest stars.
77	9	"Crimes of the Hearth"	Bill Foster	Kathy Speer & Terry Grossman	December 10, 1982
When Benson's condo is burglarized, he finds out that it won't be easy to catch the crooks. George Murdock guest stars.
78	10	"Mary and Her Lambs"	Rob Dames	Bob Fraser & Rob Dames	December 17, 1982
It's Christmastime and Benson helps an assistant cook keep her foster children.
79	11	"Pen Pal"	Bill Foster	Bob Fraser & Rob Dames	December 31, 1982
Kraus's pen pal, an ex-convict, visits her, hoping for a job.
80	12	"The Honeymooners"	Gary Brown	Kathy Speer & Terry Grossman	January 7, 1983
Kraus is about to get married. But when the groom can't make it, Benson stands in as a proxy but ends up really married to her.
81	13	"Close Encounters on the Third Hole"	Bill Foster	Bob Fraser & Rob Dames	January 14, 1983
While Benson and the Governor are playing golf, a UFO shows up.
82	14	"Katie's Boyfriend"	Mark Warren	Bob Colleary	January 21, 1983
The Governor allows Katie to go on her first date.
83	15	"The Royal Painting"	Bill Foster	Joan Brooker & Nancy Eddo	January 28, 1983
A former street gang is hired to paint the mansion in preparation for a visit from the Queen of England.
84	16	"Boys Night Out"	Bill Foster	Kathy Speer & Terry Grossman	February 4, 1983
The men come to Benson's house to swap stories, play cards, and watch Tv.
85	17	"Family Tree"	Bill Foster	Kathy Speer & Terry Grossman	February 18, 1983
Benson and Clayton learn that they might be related to each other.
86	18	"Calamity Kraus"	Bill Foster	Bob Fraser & Rob Dames	February 25, 1983
Kraus pretends to be a wealthy heiress to keep a manufacturing plant in the state.
87	19	"Kraus Sings the Blues"	Bill Foster	Barry Fanaro & Mort Nathan	March 4, 1983
Benson hosts a telethon; when other acts cancel, he lets Kraus sing.
88	20	"Half-Court Trap"	Bill Foster	Bill Boulware	March 11, 1983
Benson learns that his nephew, a basketball star, can hardly read or write.
89	21	"A View from the Roof"	Bill Foster	Barry Fanaro & Mort Nathan	March 18, 1983
Benson and the Governor try putting an antenna on the roof, but the ladder falls and the two get trapped up there along with Kraus.
90	22	"Love in a Funny Phase"	Linda Day	Bob Fraser & Rob Dames	March 31, 1983
Benson's girlfriend announces she'll date other men.

=== Season 5 (1983–84) ===
No. overall	No. in season	Title	Directed by	Written by	Original release date
91	1	"Band of Gold"	Bill Foster	Winifred Hervey and Bill Boulware	September 16, 1983
In the fifth-season opener, Denise and Pete are about to get married in the woods and Benson & Kraus become stranded
92	2	"Human Element"	Gary Brown	Barry Fanaro & Mort Nathan	September 23, 1983
A robot is brought into the mansion, causing discomfort among the staff.
93	3	"God, I Need This Job"	Bill Foster	Bob Fraser & Rob Dames	September 30, 1983
Everyone thinks that Benson is out of his mind when he sees, hears, and talks to the spirit of Jessica Tate (Katherine Helmond). This episode gives some brief closure to the several cliffhangers that featured in the final episode of Soap, which aired just over two years previously.
94	4	"Who's Arnold?"	Bill Foster	Winifred Hervey	October 7, 1983
Benson poses as Kraus's husband when her mother visits from Germany. Deborah Pratt guest stars.
95	5	"Full Court Press"	Katherine Helmond	Bill Boulware	October 21, 1983
Katie is assigned to write a report about what goes on in the mansion, resulting in Clayton's lawsuit against Benson for defamation.
96	6	"Down the Drain"	Bill Foster	Barry Fanaro & Mort Nathan	October 28, 1983
Plumbing problems at Benson's flat cause him to call a crotchety old workman (Jack O'Leary) to fix his sink. But something unexpected happens to the plumber.
97	7	"It Ain't Sheik"	Bill Foster	T : Bob Fraser & Rob Dames; S : Ralph Phillips	November 4, 1983
Benson gets the annoying assignments of persuading a sheik to alter his plans for a multi-million dollar headquarter complex, and of stopping the sheik's passionate advances toward Kraus. Bob Fraser guest stars.
98	8	"You Can't Give It Away"	Rob Dames	Kathy Speer & Terry Grossman	November 11, 1983
Benson wins the state lottery.
99	9	"Katie's Cookies"	Bill Foster	Barry Fanaro & Mort Nathan	November 18, 1983
Benson helps Katie win a cookie contest while he's supposed to be testifying against the mob. William Smith guest stars.
100	10	"Labor Pains"	Gary Brown	Bill Boulware	November 25, 1983
While Benson's neighbor is trapped in a snowstorm, Benson must take care of his baby.
101	11	"Unlisted Love"	Gary Brown	Winifred Hervey	December 2, 1983
The Governor meets again the woman (Arlene Golonka) he had a crush on in high school.
102	12	"The Governor's Brain Is Missing"	Bill Foster	Kathy Speer & Terry Grossman	December 16, 1983
Army operatives replace Governor Gatling with a double.
103	13	"A Real Gone Daddy"	Ellen Falcon	Daryl G. Nickens	December 23, 1983
Benson receives an honorary degree at Pete's alma mater, but the festivities take a strange turn when nostalgia transforms Pete into the coffeehouse beatnik poet he used to be. Vincent Schiavelli guest stars.
104	14	"Too Pooped to Pip"	Gary Brown & Mark Warren	Winifred Hervey	January 6, 1984
Benson tries hard to get Gladys Knight and the Pips to perform at a telethon.
105	15	"In All the Wrong Places"	Gary Brown	Bill Boulware	January 13, 1984
Katie's school chum, Winston, starts a campaign to get his widowed mother and Benson to the altar.
106	16	"Embarrassing Moments"	Bill Foster	Debra Frank & Scott Rubenstein	January 20, 1984
Benson is named Citywide Magazine's "Bachelor of the Month," but the female response threatens his romance with the photographer.
107	17	"Take My Life, Please"	Gary Brown	Barry Fanaro & Mort Nathan	January 27, 1984
When the visiting President orders a security check of all the employees at the mansion, Benson is labeled a spy.
108	18	"Beauty and the Beef"	Bill Foster	Winifred Hervey	February 3, 1984
When Benson judges a beauty pageant, Clayton and Governor Gatling try to sway the vote in their directions.
109	19	"We Deliver"	Bill Foster	Bill Boulware	February 24, 1984
While Denise is about to give birth, Denise, Benson, and the Governor get stuck in an elevator.
110	20	"The Endicott Dynasty"	Bill Foster	Kathy Speer & Terry Grossman	March 2, 1984
Clayton gets upset when his father (Stephen Elliott) chooses Benson to run his business empire upon his death. Note: Billie Bird appears as Clayton's Mom, the next year she would join the cast as the Governor's cook.
111	21	"The Little Hotel That Could"	Katherine Helmond	Robin Pennington	March 9, 1984
Kraus nags Benson into joining her to save an old hotel from being torn down.
112	22	"Let's Play Doctor"	Gary Brown	Barry Fanaro & Mort Nathan	May 4, 1984
Benson learns that a crusty old doctor, up for the governor's Humanitarian Award, does not have a medical license.

=== Season 6 (1984–85) ===
No. overall	No. in season	Title	Directed by	Written by	Original release date
113	1	"The Scandal"	Gary Brown	Barry Fanaro & Mort Nathan	September 21, 1984
While going undercover, Benson learns that the lieutenant governor is accepting bribes from a construction company. Susan Ruttan guest stars.
114	2	"The Inheritance"	Gary Brown	Kathy Speer & Terry Grossman	September 28, 1984
Benson finds it hard to believe that he is the sole heir to the Playbird magazine empire. Penny Baker and Joel Brooks guest star. Note: This episode was filmed much later in production order. Billie Bird appears in the opening titles, but she will not join the series for another six episodes. Ethan Phillips and Didi Conn (who left the show partway through the season) do not appear, and are not billed.
115	3	"Let's Get Physical"	Bill Foster	Robin Pennington	October 12, 1984
Benson's pleasure turns to panic when the attractive doctor who conducted his physical wants to meet with him to discuss the results. Note: This episode was filmed much later in production order. Billie Bird appears in the opening titles, but she will not join the series for another five episodes. Ethan Phillips and Didi Conn (who left the show partway through the season) do not appear, and are not billed. Guest Stars: Jayne Kennedy as Dr. Elizabeth Burnett, Belita Moreno as Nurse Mary and Daryl Keith Roach.
116	4	"The Campaign"	Gary Brown	Bill Boulware	October 19, 1984
After Benson decides to run for lieutenant governor, he learns that a major supporter expects to be repaid with political favors. Dick Sargent guest stars. Part one of two.
117	5	"The Election"	Gary Brown	Winifred Hervey	October 26, 1984
Benson's campaign runs out of money. When Senator Tyler wants a debate, even though Claytor and Governor Gatling don't like it, Benson accepts the offer. Part two of two.
118	6	"Made in Hong Kong: Part 1"	Bill Foster	Bob Fraser & Rob Dames	November 2, 1984
Benson, the Governor, Clayton, and Kraus go off to Hong Kong, where Clayton is mistaken for a famous designer and kidnapped by a fashion tycoon and her henchmen. Marian Mercer guest stars. Note: Filmed on location in Hong Kong. This episode was filmed later in production order. Billie Bird appears in the opening titles, but she will not join the series for another two episodes. Ethan Phillips and Didi Conn (who left the show partway through the season) do not appear, and are not billed.
119	7	"Made in Hong Kong: Part 2"	Bill Foster	Bob Fraser & Rob Dames	November 9, 1984
Benson, with help from the police, is pursued while trying to rescue the captured Governor and Kraus, who earlier attempted to rescue Clayton from Lady Van Dyne. Note: Filmed on location in Hong Kong. This episode was filmed later in production order. Billie Bird appears in the opening titles, but she will not join the series until the next episode. Ethan Phillips and Didi Conn (who left the show partway through the season) do not appear, and are not billed.
120	8	"Hello, We Must Be Going"	Gary Brown	Bill Boulware	November 16, 1984
Benson plans to name Kraus his assistant, but things go awry when someone with political clout is hired instead. Denise accepts her dream job with NASA in Texas and asks Benson to help her convince her husband Pete to move to Texas with her. Note: Final regular appearance of Didi Conn and Ethan Phillips; they will make one more appearance later in the season. Billie Bird had previously appeared as Clayton's mom in episode 5.20 makes her first appearance as the Governor's new cook without any introduction.
121	9	"Double Date"	Gilbert Moses	T : Bob Fraser & Rob Dames; S/T : Ron Birnbach	November 23, 1984
Benson fixes Clayton up with a date. Guest Stars: Gail Edwards and Annazette Chase.
122	10	"Taking It to the Max"	Rob Dames	Winifred Hervey	November 30, 1984
Benson is shocked when his sister (Vernee Watson-Johnson) ignores his advice to be cautious with her ex-boyfriend.
123	11	"The Reunion"	Gilbert Moses	Winifred Hervey	December 7, 1984
Benson visits with his brother and uncle, whom he hasn't seen in years. Julius Harris and Kene Holliday, Helen Martin, Alva L. Petway, James A. Williams and Vernee Watson-Johnson.
124	12	"Make War, Not Love"	Katherine Helmond	Barry Fanaro & Mort Nathan	December 14, 1984
Benson's attendance at a trade conference sets off two nations' declaration of war. Guest Stars: Julie Payne as Eunice, Terry Alexander as Mr. Adams and Peter Elbling as President Fredrick Voorhies.
125	13	"Home for Christmas"	Bill Foster	Bob Colleary	December 21, 1984
While unconscious after tripping and falling, Benson dreams about Christmas with his mother.
126	14	"On the Road"	Bill Foster	Bill Boulware	January 11, 1985
When their car breaks down on a country road, Benson & Kraus spend the night at a truck stop where Kraus fends off the advances of a burly truck driver. Mills Watson, John Matuszak and Arthur Taxier guest stars.
127	15	"Take This Job and Love It"	Bill Foster	Barry Fanaro & Mort Nathan	January 18, 1985
Benson takes on a mayor who plans to outlaw breakdancing in public places. Note: This episode was filmed much earlier in the season when Ethan Phillips and Didi Conn were still cast members. This episode is set immediately after Benson's election as lieutenant governor in October, and is presented as a flashback to explain the appearances of Denise and Pete. Final appearances of Pete (Ethan Phillips) and Denise (Didi Conn).
128	16	"Making Change"	Rob Dames	Winifred Hervey	January 25, 1985
Benson, the Governor, Kraus, and Clayton talk about people from their pasts who influenced their lives.
129	17	"Solid Gold"	Gary Brown	Bill Boulware	February 1, 1985
On a trip to Las Vegas, Katie and the Governor do some bonding, Clayton does some gambling, and Benson and Kraus take part in a lounge act. Marty Allen, Pete Barbutti, Ruta Lee, Smothers Brothers, and Bobby Vinton guest star.
130	18	"The Oval Office"	Bill Foster	Bob Fraser & Rob Dames	February 8, 1985
Called in by President Reagan because of a remark Benson made, Benson and the Governor get trapped in the Oval Office.
131	19	"Mid-life Cowboy" "Mid-life Crisis"	Gary Brown	Cherie Eichen & Bill Steinkellner	February 15, 1985
An exhausted Governor Gatling decides to unwind by playing cowboy at a dude ranch. Max Wright guest stars.
132	20	"Scenario"	Rob Dames	Rob Dames & Bob Fraser	February 22, 1985
The staff attempts to run the state government from a bomb shelter during a nuclear attack war exercise.
133	21	"Dubois: Portrait of a Politician"	Rob Dames	Rob Dames & Bob Fraser	March 15, 1985
While the Governor is away on business, Benson, as acting governor, vetoes a bill that the Governor had agreed to sign. Guest Stars: Alex Kubik as Joseph Two Horses and Bob Fraser as Senator Tyler.
134	22	"Katie's Cousin"	Bill Foster	Bob Colleary	March 22, 1985
Katie's cousin Laura (Missy Gold's real-life sister Tracey Gold) persuades Katie to lie to her father about sleeping at a friend's house. Benson sees Katie out at a bar instead.
135	23	"The Bookburner"	Gary Brown	Bob Colleary	March 29, 1985
Benson's tie-breaking vote on a school bill leads to a major conflict with a powerful senator and to a book-burning.
136	24	"Jung at Heart"	Bob Fraser	Barry Fanaro & Mort Nathan	April 5, 1985
When Clayton is passed over for Man of the Year in favor of Benson, his mind plays him a trick: he believes he has become Benson.

=== Season 7 (1985–86) ===
No. overall	No. in season	Title	Directed by	Written by	Original release date
137	1	"Benson the Hero"	Rob Dames	Bob Colleary	October 4, 1985
Benson foils an armed robbery. So the robber's attorney hits him with a civil suit.
138	2	"Love and Politics"	Bill Foster	Clay Graham & John Donley	October 11, 1985
Benson revisits his romantic relationship with Senator Hartford, but a bill Clayton supports complicates matters. Guest Stars: Donna LaBrie as Sen. Diane Hartford, Michelle Callahan as Hostess and Rosie Malek-Yonan as Assistant.
139	3	"Uncle Jack"	Gary Brown	Robin Pennington	October 18, 1985
Benson tries to bring the Governor and his brother Jack together after a 25-year estrangement. Guest Stars: Sandy McPeak as Jack Gatling, Donald Gibb as Big Luther and Nicholas Worth as Big Rudy.
140	4	"The Stranger"	Bill Foster	Tom Biener & Ron Landry	October 25, 1985
A mysterious stranger lurks around the Governor's mansion on Halloween night. William Marshall and Tom Biener guest star.
141	5	"We Spy"	Bill Foster	Jurgen Wolff	November 8, 1985
While Benson and Kraus go to East Germany on official business, the two are accused of being spies. Christopher Neame guest stars.
142	6	"$1,000,000 an Hour"	Gary Brown	Elena Yates & Ken Eulo	November 15, 1985
Benson and Clayton must spend an $8-million surplus before the next fiscal year begins—in mere hours. Martin E. Brooks guest stars.
143	7	"Flight of the Dodo: Part 1"	Bill Foster	Bob Fraser & Rob Dames	November 29, 1985
On their way to play golf, Benson, the Governor, and Clayton run into danger with Clayton as their helicopter pilot.
144	8	"Flight of the Dodo: Part 2"	Bill Foster	Bob Fraser & Rob Dames	December 6, 1985
After crash-landing the helicopter in the desert, Benson, the Governor, and Clayton struggle to survive.
145	9	"Two Boys and Their Dog"	Rob Dames	Don Hart	December 13, 1985
One of Clayton's wacky investment schemes involves a wiener dog.
146	10	"Last Man on Earth"	Gary Brown	Tom Biener & Ron Landry	January 3, 1986
After talk about Halley's comet, Kraus dreams that she and Benson are the only ones left on earth. NOTE: Robert Guillaume's daughter Melissa appears in the dream sequence as Mary. Benson's daughter with Kraus.
147	11	"Secret Love"	Bill Foster	Tom Biener & Ron Landry	January 18, 1986
Clayton's living arrangements create a problem for his confirmation to be the state's budget director. Jack Dodson guest stars.
148	12	"Summer of Discontent"	Whitney J. LeBlanc	Clay Graham & John Donley	January 25, 1986
Benson's happy-go-lucky nephew arrives to spend the summer with his uncle. Keenen Ivory Wayans guest stars.
149	13	"Parade Rest"	Rob Dames	Bob Colleary	February 1, 1986
A veteran is hired to retile the bathroom, but disappears.
150	14	"Reel Murder: Part 1"	Bob Fraser	Bob Fraser & Rob Dames	February 8, 1986
Actor George Kennedy's plan to film a movie in the Governor's mansion turns into a murder mystery. Joanna Barnes and Robert Picardo guest star. NOTE: Robert Guillaume's son Kevin appears as Watson Street.
151	15	"Reel Murder: Part 2"	Bob Fraser	Bob Fraser & Rob Dames	February 15, 1986
With everyone's lives in danger and not much time left, they try to crack the case.
152	16	"The Hat and the Ring"	Lee Shallat	Clay Graham & John Donley	February 22, 1986
Benson is convinced that the question Senator Diane Hartford has for him is "the" question.
153	17	"The Bucks Stop Here"	Bill Foster	Don Hart	March 1, 1986
Clayton has his sights set on running the family fortune, until he meets his father's young, pretty fiancee.
154	18	"Pardon Me"	Rob Dames	Bob Colleary	March 15, 1986
Benson persuades the governor to pardon a man wrongly imprisoned for 25 years, but he'd rather stay in prison.
155	19	"Hi, Society"	Gary Brown	Bob Colleary	March 22, 1986
A conservation expert may help Benson and the Governor pass an important bill. But when Kraus hears of the strategy, she leaks it to a friend, who turns out to be a gossip.
156	20	"Three on a Mismatch"	Rob Dames	S : Bill Overton & Ken Russ; S/T : Clay Graham & John Donley	March 29, 1986
The Governor answers a personals ad which results in him dating Benson's old girlfriend.
157	21	"Friends and Enemies"	Hilton L. Smack	Tom Biener & Ron Landry	April 12, 1986
With Governor Gatling's latest term about to end, the assumption is that he can't run again. Then he learns that he can run again and does, competing with his old friend Benson for the job.
158	22	"And the Winner Is..."	Gary Brown	Tom Biener & Ron Landry	April 19, 1986
People await to learn the winner of the election.
