= List of Full House episodes =

This is a list of episodes for the American television sitcom Full House. In total, there were 192 episodes filmed for the show over the course of its eight seasons, from 1987 to 1995.

Full House chronicles a widowed father's struggles of raising his three young daughters and the lives that they touch. The patriarch of the family, Danny (Bob Saget), invites his brother-in-law, Jesse (John Stamos), and his best friend, Joey (Dave Coulier), to help raise his children (Candace Cameron, Jodie Sweetin, and Mary Kate/Ashley Olsen), after his wife was killed in an automobile accident. In season four, Jesse marries Becky (Lori Loughlin), and they move into the attic. Then, in season five, Becky and Jesse have twin boys named Nicky and Alex (Daniel and Kevin Renteria/Blake and Dylan Tuomy-Wilhoit). The series ends with the two-part episode "Michelle Rides Again," which aired on May 23, 1995. The stories are generally based around a moral message.

== Series overview ==
Season	Episodes	Originally released		Rank	Rating
Season	Episodes	First released	Last released	Rank	Rating
1	22	September 22, 1987	May 6, 1988	71	10.9
2	22	October 14, 1988	May 5, 1989	28	15.5
3	24	September 22, 1989	May 4, 1990	21	15.3
4	26	September 21, 1990	May 3, 1991	14	16.1
5	26	September 17, 1991	May 12, 1992	8	17.4
6	24	September 22, 1992	May 18, 1993	10	15.8
7	24	September 14, 1993	May 17, 1994	16	14.4
8	24	September 27, 1994	May 23, 1995	24	12.5

== Episodes ==
=== Season 1 (1987–88) ===
No. overall	No. in season	Title	Directed by	Written by	Original release date	Rating/share (households)
1	1	"Our Very First Show"	Joel Zwick	Jeff Franklin	September 22, 1987	21.7/34
2	2	"Our Very First Night"	Joel Zwick	Jeff Franklin	September 25, 1987	9.3/18
3	3	"The First Day of School"	Richard Correll	Lenny Ripps	October 2, 1987	9.5/18
4	4	"Sea Cruise"	Tom Trbovich	Story by : Lenny Ripps; Teleplay by : Russell Marcus & Jeff Franklin	October 9, 1987	11.4/21
5	5	"Daddy's Home"	Howard Storm	Joan Brooker & Nancy Eddo	October 16, 1987	10.0/18
6	6	"The Return of Grandma"	Joel Zwick	Russell Marcus	October 30, 1987	11.4/21
7	7	"Knock Yourself Out"	Joel Zwick	Jeff Franklin	November 6, 1987	10.9/19
8	8	"Jesse's Girl"	Jeff Franklin & Don Van Atta	Jeff Franklin	November 13, 1987	10.1/18
9	9	"The Miracle of Thanksgiving"	Peter Baldwin	Jeff Franklin & Russell Marcus	November 20, 1987	10.3/18
10	10	"Joey's Place"	Don Barnhart	Story by : Russell Marcus; Teleplay by : Jeff Franklin & Lenny Ripps	December 4, 1987	9.8/17
11	11	"The Big Three-O"	Howard Storm	Gene Braunstein & Bob Perlow	December 11, 1987	9.5/17
12	12	"Our Very First Promo"	Richard Correll	Story by : Russell Marcus & Ron Morgrove; Teleplay by : Lenny Ripps & Arthur Silver	December 18, 1987	9.8/18
13	13	"Sisterly Love"	Lee Shallat	Lenny Ripps	January 8, 1988	12.7/20
14	14	"Half a Love Story"	Howard Storm	Jeff Franklin & Russell Marcus	January 15, 1988	13.0/22
15	15	"A Pox in Our House"	Joel Zwick	Lenny Ripps	January 29, 1988	10.9/19
16	16	"But Seriously Folks"	Joel Zwick	Russell Marcus	February 5, 1988	12.5/21
17	17	"Danny's Very First Date"	Joel Zwick	Jeff Franklin	February 12, 1988	11.7/19
18	18	"Just One of the Guys"	Lee Shallat	Lenny Ripps	March 4, 1988	14.2/24
19	19	"The Seven-Month Itch - Part 1"	Lee Shallat	Jeff Franklin	March 11, 1988	12.4/21
20	20	"The Seven-Month Itch - Part 2"	Russ Petranto	Story by : Rob Edwards & Russell Marcus; Teleplay by : Kim Weiskopf & Lenny Ripps	March 18, 1988	12.0/21
21	21	"Mad Money"	Jeff Franklin	Rob Edwards	April 29, 1988	11.7/22
22	22	"DJ Tanner's Day Off"	Joel Zwick	Kim Weiskopf & Michael S. Baser	May 6, 1988	10.3/20

=== Season 2 (1988–89) ===
No. overall	No. in season	Title	Directed by	Written by	Original release date	U.S. viewers (millions)
23	1	"Cutting It Close"	Joel Zwick	Jeff Franklin	October 14, 1988	21.1
24	2	"Tanner vs. Gibbler"	John Bowab	Lenny Ripps	October 21, 1988	22.3
25	3	"It's Not My Job"	Joel Zwick	Jeff Franklin	October 28, 1988	20.8
26	4	"D.J.'s Very First Horse"	Lee Shallat	Bob Fraser & Rob Dames	November 4, 1988	22.4
27	5	"Jingle Hell"	Peter Baldwin	Marc Warren & Dennis Rinsler	November 11, 1988	21.7
28	6	"Beach Boy Bingo"	Steve Zuckerman	Marc Warren & Dennis Rinsler	November 18, 1988	25.0
29	7	"Joey Gets Tough"	Jeff Franklin	Lenny Ripps	November 25, 1988	23.2
30	8	"Triple Date"	Peter Baldwin	Jeff Franklin	December 9, 1988	24.0
31	9	"Our Very First Christmas Show"	John Bowab	Kim Weiskopf	December 16, 1988	20.0
32	10	"Middle Age Crazy"	Peter Baldwin	Lawrence E. Hartstein & Richard H. Rossner	January 6, 1989	28.4
33	11	"A Little Romance"	John Bowab	Bob Fraser & Rob Dames	January 13, 1989	28.0
34	12	"Fogged In"	Joel Zwick	Kim Weiskopf	January 20, 1989	25.8
35	13	"Working Mothers"	Peter Baldwin	Jeff Franklin	February 3, 1989	26.6
36	14	"Little Shop of Sweaters"	Peter Baldwin	Lenny Ripps	February 10, 1989	24.6
37	15	"Pal Joey"	John Bowab	Marc Warren & Dennis Rinsler	February 17, 1989	26.1
38	16	"Baby Love"	Peter Baldwin	Jeff Franklin	February 24, 1989	29.0
39	17	"El Problema Grande de D.J."	Bill Foster	Bob Fraser & Rob Dames	March 10, 1989	23.1
40	18	"Goodbye, Mr. Bear"	Jack Shea	Kim Weiskopf & Jeff Franklin	March 24, 1989	24.4
41	19	"Blast from the Past"	Tom Rickard	Lenny Ripps	April 7, 1989	21.5
42	20	"I'm There for You, Babe"	Jack Shea	Kim Weiskopf	April 14, 1989	23.6
43	21	"Luck Be a Lady – Part 1"	Bill Foster	Story by : Bob Fraser & Rob Dames; Teleplay by : Marc Warren & Dennis Rinsler	April 28, 1989	23.3
44	22	"Luck Be a Lady – Part 2”	Bill Foster	Story by : Bob Fraser & Rob Dames; Teleplay by : Lawrence E. Hartstein & Richard H. Rossner	May 5, 1989	23.8

=== Season 3 (1989–90) ===
No. overall	No. in season	Title	Directed by	Written by	Original release date	U.S. viewers (millions)	Rating/share (households) (Note: According to The Daily Union, Nielsen ratings of 1989–90 were based on 90.4 million households as of November 8, 1989, and 92.1 million as of November 22, 1989 issue.)
45	1	"Tanner's Island"	Bill Foster	Jeff Franklin	September 22, 1989	24.3	15.1/28
46	2	"Back to School Blues"	Bill Foster	Jeff Franklin	September 29, 1989	23.5	15.0/29
47	3	"Breaking Up Is Hard to Do (in 22 Minutes)"	Bill Foster	Jeff Franklin	October 6, 1989	24.7	15.4/30
48	4	"Nerd for a Day"	Bill Foster	Lenny Ripps	October 13, 1989	23.0	14.8/29
49	5	"Granny Tanny"	Bill Foster	Marc Warren & Dennis Rinsler	October 20, 1989	25.3	16.0/30
50	6	"Star Search"	Bill Foster	Kim Weiskopf	November 3, 1989	25.9	15.7/28
51	7	"And They Call It Puppy Love"	Bill Foster	Rob Dames	November 10, 1989	25.0	14.8/26
52	8	"Divorce Court"	Jeff Franklin	Marc Warren & Dennis Rinsler	November 17, 1989	24.1	15.0/26
53	9	"Dr. Dare Rides Again"	Bill Foster	Rob Dames	November 24, 1989	23.5	13.5/24
54	10	"The Greatest Birthday on Earth"	Bill Foster	Jeff Franklin	December 1, 1989	26.1	16.0/29
55	11	"Aftershocks"	Bill Foster	Jeff Franklin & Lenny Ripps	December 8, 1989	26.3	16.1/28
56	12	"Joey & Stacey and ... Oh, Yeah, Jesse"	Bill Foster	Doug McIntyre	December 15, 1989	20.9	13.4/23
57	13	"No More Mr. Dumb Guy"	Bill Foster	Marc Warren & Dennis Rinsler	January 5, 1990	26.6	16.4/28
58	14	"Misadventures in Baby-Sitting"	Bill Foster	Shari Scharfer & Julie Strassman	January 12, 1990	27.0	16.9/29
59	15	"Lust in the Dust"	Tom Rickard	Bobby Fine & Gigi Vorgan	January 26, 1990	27.7	17.5/30
60	16	"Bye, Bye Birdie"	Jeff Franklin	Lenny Ripps	February 2, 1990	26.2	16.7/28
61	17	"13 Candles"	Bill Foster	Kim Weiskopf	February 9, 1990	26.0	15.7/28
62	18	"Mr. Egghead"	Bill Foster	Rob Dames	February 16, 1990	25.6	15.8/28
63	19	"Those Better Not Be the Days"	Bill Foster	Marc Warren & Dennis Rinsler	February 23, 1990	25.1	15.4/27
64	20	"Honey, I Broke the House"	Bill Foster	Kim Weiskopf	March 9, 1990	26.2	15.9/29
65	21	"Just Say No Way"	Jeff Franklin	Jeff Franklin	March 30, 1990	23.5	16.3/27
66	22	"Three Men and Another Baby"	Bill Foster	Lenny Ripps	April 13, 1990	21.9	14.4/28
67	23	"Fraternity Reunion"	Bill Foster	David Ketchum & Tony DiMarco	April 27, 1990	20.3	13.8/28
68	24	"Our Very First Telethon"	Bill Foster	Lenny Ripps & Shari Scharfer & Julie Strassman	May 4, 1990	20.7	13.9/27

The episode 11 season 3 (Aftershocks) was written after the 1989 Earthquake. Its scenario was designed to help kids of the San Francisco Bay Area deal with the trauma of the earthquake.

=== Season 4 (1990–91) ===
No. overall	No. in season	Title	Directed by	Written by	Original release date	U.S. viewers (millions)
69	1	"Greek Week"	Joel Zwick	Jeff Franklin	September 21, 1990	23.1
70	2	"Crimes and Michelle's Demeanor"	Joel Zwick	Scott Spencer Gorden	September 28, 1990	22.2
71	3	"The I.Q. Man"	Joel Zwick	Marc Warren & Dennis Rinsler	October 5, 1990	23.1
72	4	"Slumber Party"	Joel Zwick	Martie Cook	October 12, 1990	23.4
73	5	"Good News, Bad News"	Joel Zwick	Ellen Guylas	October 19, 1990	22.1
74	6	"A Pinch for a Pinch"	Joel Zwick	Charles A. Pratt, Jr.	October 26, 1990	24.5
75	7	"Viva Las Joey"	Joel Zwick	Marc Warren & Dennis Rinsler	November 2, 1990	24.3
76	8	"Shape Up"	Joel Zwick	Jeff Franklin	November 9, 1990	26.0
77	9	"One Last Kiss"	Joel Zwick	Leslie Ray & David Steven Simon	November 16, 1990	26.6
78	10	"Terror in Tanner Town"	Joel Zwick	Boyd Hale	November 23, 1990	25.1
79	11	"Secret Admirer"	Joel Zwick	Ellen Guylas	December 7, 1990	23.9
80	12	"Danny in Charge"	Joel Zwick	Story by : Stacey Hur; Teleplay by : Boyd Hale & Scott Spencer Gorden	December 14, 1990	18.8
81	13	"Happy New Year"	Joel Zwick	Jeff Franklin	December 28, 1990	28.3
82	14	"Working Girl"	Joel Zwick	Marc Warren & Dennis Rinsler	January 4, 1991	27.7
83	15	"Ol' Brown Eyes"	Joel Zwick	Ellen Guylas & Boyd Hale	January 11, 1991	29.0
84	16	"Stephanie Gets Framed"	Joel Zwick	Doug McIntyre	January 25, 1991	28.4
85	17	"A Fish Called Martin"	Joel Zwick	Leslie Ray & David Steven Simon	February 1, 1991	26.6
86	18	"The Wedding – Part 1"	Joel Zwick	Jeff Franklin	February 8, 1991	27.7
87	19	"The Wedding – Part 2"	Joel Zwick	Jeff Franklin	February 15, 1991	30.6
88	20	"Fuller House"	Joel Zwick	Leslie Ray & David Steven Simon	February 22, 1991	29.3
89	21	"The Hole-in-the-Wall Gang"	Joel Zwick	Craig Heller & Guy Schulman	March 1, 1991	29.9
90	22	"Stephanie Plays the Field"	Joel Zwick	Mark Fink	March 8, 1991	28.1
91	23	"Joey Goes Hollywood"	Joel Zwick	Leslie Ray & David Steven Simon	March 29, 1991	27.1
92	24	"Girls Just Wanna Have Fun"	Joel Zwick	Marc Warren & Dennis Rinsler	April 1, 1991	25.5
93	25	"The Graduates"	Joel Zwick	Ellen Guylas	April 26, 1991	23.1
94	26	"Rock the Cradle"	Joel Zwick	Boyd Hale	May 3, 1991	23.8

=== Season 5 (1991–92) ===
No. overall	No. in season	Title	Directed by	Written by	Original release date	U.S. viewers (millions)
95	1	"Double Trouble"	Joel Zwick	Jeff Franklin	September 17, 1991	26.9
96	2	"Matchmaker Michelle"	Joel Zwick	Ellen Guylas	September 24, 1991	27.7
97	3	"Take My Sister Please"	Joel Zwick	Marc Warren & Dennis Rinsler	October 1, 1991	26.1
98	4	"Oh Where, Oh Where Has My Little Girl Gone?"	Joel Zwick	Mark Fink	October 8, 1991	25.4
99	5	"The King and I"	Joel Zwick	David Pollock & Elias Davis	October 15, 1991	25.4
100	6	"The Legend of Ranger Joe"	Joel Zwick	Boyd Hale	October 22, 1991	27.6
101	7	"The Volunteer"	Joel Zwick	Marc Warren & Dennis Rinsler	October 29, 1991	26.9
102	8	"Gotta Dance"	Joel Zwick	Stacey Hur	November 5, 1991	27.3
103	9	"Happy Birthday, Babies"	Jeff Franklin	Jeff Franklin	November 12, 1991	35.7
104	10	"Happy Birthday, Babies"	Joel Zwick	Jeff Franklin	November 12, 1991	35.7
105	11	"Nicky and/or Alexander"	Joel Zwick	Ellen Guylas	November 19, 1991	30.0
106	12	"Bachelor of the Month"	Joel Zwick	Tom Burkhard	November 26, 1991	27.9
107	13	"Easy Rider"	Joel Zwick	Story by : Martie Cook; Teleplay by : Jeff Schimmel	December 3, 1991	30.6
108	14	"Sisters in Crime"	Joel Zwick	Boyd Hale	December 17, 1991	27.9
109	15	"Play It Again, Jess"	Joel Zwick	Marc Warren & Dennis Rinsler	January 7, 1992	29.5
110	16	"Crushed"	Joel Zwick	Diana "Jennie" Ayers & Susan Sebastian	January 14, 1992	30.3
111	17	"Spellbound"	Joel Zwick	Marc Warren & Dennis Rinsler	January 28, 1992	27.4
112	18	"Too Much Monkey Business"	Joel Zwick	David Pollock	February 11, 1992	25.8
113	19	"The Devil Made Me Do It"	Joel Zwick	Story by : Nicolas Wall & Jane Paris; Teleplay by : Elias Davis	February 18, 1992	28.6
114	20	"Driving Miss D.J."	Joel Zwick	Mark Fink	February 25, 1992	26.8
115	21	"Yours, Mine and Ours"	Bill Petty	Stacey Hur	March 3, 1992	29.0
116	22	"Trouble with Danny"	Joel Zwick	Ellen Guylas & David Pollock	March 17, 1992	28.9
117	23	"Five's a Crowd"	Joel Zwick	Ellen Guylas	March 31, 1992	27.3
118	24	"Girls Will Be Boys"	Joel Zwick	Tom Burkhard & Stacey Hur	April 28, 1992	23.7
119	25	"Captain Video – Part 1"	Joel Zwick	Mark Fink & Boyd Hale	May 5, 1992	24.9
120	26	"Captain Video – Part 2"	Joel Zwick	Marc Warren & Dennis Rinsler	May 12, 1992	21.4

=== Season 6 (1992–93) ===
No. overall	No. in season	Title	Directed by	Written by	Original release date	U.S. viewers (millions)
121	1	"Come Fly with Me"	Joel Zwick	Marc Warren & Dennis Rinsler	September 22, 1992	25.3
122	2	"The Long Goodbye"	Joel Zwick	Ellen Guylas	September 29, 1992	24.0
123	3	"Road to Tokyo"	Joel Zwick	Ken Hecht	October 6, 1992	26.1
124	4	"Radio Days"	Richard Correll	Tom Burkhard	October 13, 1992	22.3
125	5	"Lovers and Other Tanners"	Joel Zwick	Jay Abramowitz	October 20, 1992	24.3
126	6	"Educating Jesse"	Joel Zwick	Tom Burkhard	October 27, 1992	24.9
127	7	"Trouble in Twin Town"	Joel Zwick	Ellen Guylas	November 10, 1992	24.4
128	8	"The Play's the Thing"	Joel Zwick	Tom Amundsen	November 17, 1992	25.6
129	9	"Nice Guys Finish First"	Joel Zwick	Jamie Tatham & Chuck Tatham	November 24, 1992	25.8
130	10	"I'm Not D.J."	Richard Correll	Sarit Katz & Gloria Ketterer	December 1, 1992	25.9
131	11	"Designing Mothers"	Joel Zwick	Sarit Katz & Gloria Ketterer	December 8, 1992	24.8
132	12	"A Very Tanner Christmas"	Joel Zwick	Jay Abramowitz	December 15, 1992	24.1
133	13	"The Dating Game"	Joel Zwick	Jerry Winnick	January 5, 1993	27.3
134	14	"Birthday Blues"	John Tracy	Mark Fink	January 19, 1993	27.1
135	15	"Be True to Your Preschool"	Joel Zwick	Tom Amundsen	January 26, 1993	N/A
136	16	"The Heartbreak Kid"	Joel Zwick	Cathy Jung	February 9, 1993	25.4
137	17	"Silence Is Not Golden"	Joel Zwick	Ken Hecht	February 16, 1993	27.6
138	18	"Please Don't Touch the Dinosaur"	John Tracy	Jamie Tatham & Chuck Tatham	February 23, 1993	28.3
139	19	"Subterranean Graduation Blues"	John Tracy	Story by : Marc Warren & Dennis Rinsler; Teleplay by : Tom Burkhard	March 2, 1993	25.6
140	20	"Grand Gift Auto"	John Tracy	Ellen Guylas	March 16, 1993	26.3
141	21	"Room for One More?"	Tom Rickard	Story by : Marc Warren & Dennis Rinsler; Teleplay by : Stacey Hur	April 6, 1993	20.9
142	22	"Prom Night"	Joel Zwick	Adrienne Armstrong & Martie Cook	May 4, 1993	20.2
143	23	"The House Meets the Mouse – Part 1"	Joel Zwick	Marc Warren & Dennis Rinsler	May 11, 1993	18.7
144	24	"The House Meets the Mouse – Part 2"	Joel Zwick	Marc Warren & Dennis Rinsler	May 18, 1993	22.4

=== Season 7 (1993–94) ===
No. overall	No. in season	Title	Directed by	Written by	Original release date	U.S. viewers (millions)
145	1	"It Was a Dark and Stormy Night"	John Tracy	Marc Warren & Dennis Rinsler	September 14, 1993	17.8
146	2	"The Apartment"	John Tracy	Tom Burkhard	September 21, 1993	17.6
147	3	"Wrong-Way Tanner"	John Tracy	Jamie Tatham & Chuck Tatham	September 28, 1993	19.2
148	4	"Tough Love"	Joel Zwick	Ellen Guylas	October 5, 1993	23.7
149	5	"Fast Friends"	John Tracy	Bob Sand	October 12, 1993	23.9
150	6	"Smash Club: The Next Generation"	John Tracy	Carolyn Omine	October 19, 1993	22.3
151	7	"High Anxiety"	John Tracy	Tom Amundsen	October 26, 1993	23.1
152	8	"Another Opening, Another No Show"	John Tracy	Story by : Elias Davis; Teleplay by : Tom Burkhard	November 2, 1993	20.8
153	9	"The Day of the Rhino"	James O'Keefe	Adam I. Lapidus	November 9, 1993	25.5
154	10	"The Prying Game"	John Tracy	Ellen Guylas	November 16, 1993	23.9
155	11	"The Bicycle Thief"	John Tracy	Chuck Tatham & Jamie Tatham	November 23, 1993	21.6
156	12	"Support Your Local Parents"	James O'Keefe	Bob Sand	November 30, 1993	24.0
157	13	"The Perfect Couple"	John Tracy	Marc Warren & Dennis Rinsler	December 14, 1993	19.5
158	14	"Is It True About Stephanie?"	Joel Zwick	Carolyn Omine	January 4, 1994	25.8
159	15	"The Test"	John Tracy	Dan Chasin & Linda Lane	January 11, 1994	21.8
160	16	"Joey's Funny Valentine"	John Tracy	Adam I. Lapidus	January 25, 1994	25.3
161	17	"The Last Dance"	John Tracy	Tom Amundsen	February 8, 1994	26.6
162	18	"Kissing Cousins"	John Tracy	Tom Burkhard	February 15, 1994	22.6
163	19	"Love on the Rocks"	Tom Rickard	Ellen Guylas	March 1, 1994	22.9
164	20	"Michelle a la Carte"	John Tracy	Cathy Jung	March 15, 1994	22.3
165	21	"Be Your Own Best Friend"	Joel Zwick	Story by : Marc Warren & Dennis Rinsler; Teleplay by : Tom Amundsen & Ellen Guylas	April 5, 1994	19.8
166	22	"A Date with Fate"	Joel Zwick	Story by : Marc Warren & Dennis Rinsler; Teleplay by : Bob Sand & Chuck Tatham & Jamie Tatham	May 3, 1994	16.7
167	23	"Too Little Richard Too Late"	John Tracy	Story by : Marc Warren & Dennis Rinsler; Teleplay by : Elias Davis	May 10, 1994	17.0
168	24	"A House Divided"	Joel Zwick	Story by : Marc Warren & Dennis Rinsler; Teleplay by : Tom Burkhard & Adam I. Lapidus & Carolyn Omine	May 17, 1994	16.3

=== Season 8 (1994–95) ===
No. overall	No. in season	Title	Directed by	Written by	Original release date	U.S. viewers (millions)
169	1	"Comet's Excellent Adventure"	Joel Zwick	Marc Warren & Dennis Rinsler	September 27, 1994	20.4
170	2	"Breaking Away"	Joel Zwick	Tom Amundsen	October 4, 1994	19.4
171	3	"Making Out Is Hard to Do"	Joel Zwick	Carolyn Omine	October 11, 1994	18.6
172	4	"I've Got a Secret"	Joel Zwick	Ellen Guylas	October 18, 1994	18.8
173	5	"To Joey, With Love"	Joel Zwick	Jamie Tatham & Chuck Tatham	October 25, 1994	19.3
174	6	"You Pet It, You Bought It"	Joel Zwick	Greg Fields	November 1, 1994	21.3
175	7	"On the Road Again"	Tom Rickard	Ellen Guylas	November 8, 1994	14.4
176	8	"Claire and Present Danger"	Joel Zwick	Tom Amundsen	November 22, 1994	20.4
177	9	"Stephanie's Wild Ride"	John Tracy	Adam I. Lapidus	November 29, 1994	19.1
178	10	"Under the Influence"	John Tracy	Adam I. Lapidus	December 6, 1994	21.8
179	11	"Arrest Ye Merry Gentlemen"	John Tracy	Carolyn Omine	December 13, 1994	20.6
180	12	"D.J.'s Choice"	John Tracy	Mark Fink	January 3, 1995	21.6
181	13	"The Producer"	James O'Keefe	Diana Darby	January 10, 1995	20.8
182	14	"Super Bowl Fun Day"	Joel Zwick	Jamie Tatham & Chuck Tatham	January 25, 1995	18.7
183	15	"My Left and Right Foot"	Tom Rickard	Ellen Guylas	January 31, 1995	18.2
184	16	"Air Jesse"	Joel Zwick	Laurie Parres	February 7, 1995	20.9
185	17	"Dateless in San Francisco"	Joel Zwick	Greg Fields	February 14, 1995	17.3
186	18	"We Got the Beat"	John Tracy	Marc Warren & Dennis Rinsler	February 21, 1995	18.2
187	19	"Taking the Plunge"	John Tracy	Tom Amundsen	February 28, 1995	20.5
188	20	"Up on the Roof"	John Tracy	Story by : David Valliere; Teleplay by : Matt Miller & Barrie Nedler	March 14, 1995	19.6
189	21	"Leap of Faith"	Joel Zwick	Chuck Tatham & Jamie Tatham	March 21, 1995	18.9
190	22	"All Stood Up"	Joel Zwick	Story by : Marc Warren & Dennis Rinsler; Teleplay by : Carolyn Omine & Adam I. Lapidus	April 4, 1995	18.2
191	23	"Michelle Rides Again (Parts 1 and 2)"	Joel Zwick	Story by : Marc Warren & Dennis Rinsler; Teleplay by : Adam I. Lapidus	May 23, 1995	24.3
192	24	"Michelle Rides Again (Parts 1 and 2)"	Joel Zwick	Story by : Marc Warren & Dennis Rinsler; Teleplay by : Carolyn Omine	May 23, 1995	24.3
