= Wipeout =

Wipe out or wipeout may refer to:

== Media ==
=== Music ===
- "Wipe Out" (instrumental), a 1963 hit surf-rock song by The Surfaris
  - Wipe Out (album), the 1963 album containing the song

=== Television ===
- Wipeout (1988 game show), an American trivia competition show
  - Wipeout (British game show), a 1994–2002 British derivative of the above program
  - Wipeout (1999 game show), a 1999–2000 Australian derivative of the above program
- Wipeout (2008 game show), an American competition television show featuring obstacle courses that was broadcast on ABC
  - Any of various international versions of this show
  - Wipeout (2021 game show), a 2021 American reboot of the 2008 game show that airs on TBS

=== Video games ===
- Wipeout (video game series), a video game series
  - Wipeout (video game), the first game in the series
- Any of various video games based on the 2008 show featuring obstacle courses
- Total party kill or wipeout, in roleplaying games, when an entire group is killed by hostile units

== Amusement rides ==
- Wipeout (Dreamworld), a specific ride in Australia
- Wipeout (ride), a type of amusement ride
- Wipeout (roller coaster), a Boomerang roller coaster

== Other uses ==
- Wipe out (surfing), a surfing term
- Wipe Out (tennis), a tennis game
- Wipeout (comics), a fictional character
- Wipeout (elections), a dramatic loss

== See also ==
- The Wipeouters, an alias of the American band Devo
