= Eulo =

Eulo can refer to:

- Eulo, Queensland, Australia, locality
- Ken Eulo, American author

== See also ==
- Eulodrobia eulo, species of freshwater snails
