= Wipeout (1999 game show) =

- Genre: Game show
- Based on: Wipeout by Bob Fraser
- Directed by: Robert Burton
- Presented by: Tony Johnston
- Announcer: Troy Swindells-Grose
- Theme music composer: Whitenoise Productions Sydney
- Country of origin: Australia
- Original language: English
- No. of episodes: 460

Production
- Executive producers: Wayne Cameron; Michael Boughen
- Producer: Nina Campbell
- Production locations: Brisbane, Queensland
- Cinematography: Rick Boogers; Matthew Peterson; Mark Johnston
- Camera setup: Multi-camera
- Running time: 24 minutes
- Production company: Southern Star Group

Original release
- Network: Seven Network
- Release: 15 February 1999 – 24 November 2000

Related
- Wipeout (US version); Wipeout (UK version)

Wipeout was an Australian game show that aired on the Seven Network from 15 February 1999 to 24 November 2000. The show was based on the original American series of the same title and was hosted by Tony Johnston. This version was the only one to use children as contestants, and in turn used points instead of dollars due to a law in Australia and Europe which prohibits children from winning money on game shows. After the show was cancelled, it was rerun until 2004.

== Format ==
=== First two rounds ===
The game was played with computer-driven game boards shown on a large screen. The correct answers were indicated by checkmarks and the Wipeouts were indicated by crosses. There were generally twelve correct answers and four Wipeouts per board. In the beginning of the show, the crosses appeared after an explosion; later they appeared in a variety of ways. Correct answers were worth 25 points each in board one and 50 points each in board two. Also, after an answer, play immediately went to the next contestant. In addition, the "Hot Spot" was simply called the "Bonus" but otherwise acted the same. The lowest scoring contestant was eliminated at the end of the round. If the round ended in a tie, the tied contestants were then shown a tiebreaker board with 12 answers arranged in a frame. Eight were right, and four were wrong. The tied contestants (starting with the player who won the coin toss) went back and forth picking answers until one contestant was wiped out. The first contestant to be wiped out was eliminated from the game, and the other player advanced to the next round.

=== Third round (Bid for the Grid) ===
In Bid for the Grid, there were twelve answers on the board. In early episodes, eight were right, and four were wrong. In later episodes, the number of correct answers and Wipeouts was split evenly with six apiece. Contestants secretly locked in their bids following five seconds of thinking time; the higher bid (or, in case of a tie, the faster entry) played. Once the player won the bidding, he/she had to give that number of answers in a row without a Wipeout. If the contestant could complete the contract, he/she won the board; but if the contestant wiped out, the opposing player had to give just one correct answer to win the board. If the stealing player wiped out, play went back to the original player still trying to complete to contract and win the board. The first player to win two out of three boards won the game and the right to play the bonus round.

=== Bonus round (Win it in a Minute) ===
In the bonus round, the contestant had to select a category (from two given) to play. They then had 60 seconds to find six correct answers on a grid of twelve possible answers. The contestant had to enter his/her guesses on an oversized keypad and then run to the buzzer located near the display to check his/her performance. The contestant was allowed to turn on more than six answers but if they did, a computerized voice would repeatedly say, "Too many, too many!" and the buzzer would not respond if they hit it. Winning the bonus round won him/her a major prize, which changed on occasion.
