= Missy Gold =

American psychologist and former child actress

- Education: Georgetown University; California School of Professional Psychology
- Occupations: Actress, psychologist
- Years active: 1976–1986
- Known for: Benson
- Relatives: Tracey Gold (sister)

Missy Gold is an American psychologist and former child actress. Her most notable role is Governor Eugene X. Gatling's daughter, Katie Gatling, on the ABC sitcom Benson (1979–1986).

== Career ==
Gold appeared on Eight Is Enough; Fantasy Island; The Hardy Boys/Nancy Drew Mysteries; and Trapper John, M.D. before playing Katie Gatling on Benson (1979–1986).

Gold is now a licensed psychologist.

== Personal life ==
Gold earned a B.A. at Georgetown University and then earned a Ph.D. from California School of Professional Psychology.

== Filmography ==
Year	Title	Role	Notes	Ref.
1976	Captains and the Kings	Mary Armagh as a Child	Miniseries	
1977	Rafferty	Judy Cardler	Episode: "The Epidemic"	
1977	The Hardy Boys/Nancy Drew Mysteries	Grace	Episode: "Will the Real Santa Claus...?"	
1978	Little Mo	Brenda Brinker	Television film	
1978	Sword of Justice	Nancy	Episode: "Aloha, Julie Lang"	
1978	Ishi: The Last of His Tribe	Little Girl	Television film	
1978	The Kid from Not-So-Big	Bobbi		
1979	Eight Is Enough	Missy Kappleton	Episode: "Best of Friends"	
1979	How the West Was Won	Stacy Willow	Episode: "The Forgotten"	
1979	Project U.F.O.	Billie Ryerson	Episode: "Sighting 4025: The Whitman Tower Incident"	
1979–1986	Benson	Katherine 'Katie' Olivia Gatling	158 episodes	
1980	Fantasy Island	Stephanie Hendricks	Episode: "The Love Doctor/Pleasure Palace/Possessed"	
1981	Twirl	Traci Jordan	Television film	
1984	Trapper John, M.D.	Rachel McCall	Episode: "Moonlighting Becomes You"	
1984	Celebrity Hot Potato	Herself	5 episodes	
1986	The Blinkins	Blink	Voice role, 4 episodes	
