= Wipeout (British game show) =

British TV quiz show (1994–2003)

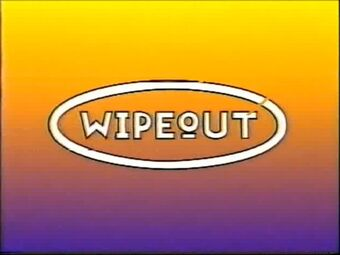
- Also known as: One False Move
- Genre: Game show
- Based on: Wipeout by Bob Fraser
- Directed by: David G. Taylor (Series 1, 3–4); Babara Jones (Series 2)
- Presented by: Andy Craig; Paul Daniels; Bob Monkhouse
- Announcer: Kara Noble; Henrietta Bess; Charles Nove; George Layton; Tom Edwards
- Theme music composer: David Arch (Series 1–4); Simon Etchell (One False Move; Series 5–9)
- Country of origin: United Kingdom
- Original language: English
- No. of series: 1 (Galaxy/Sky One); 9 (BBC1)
- No. of episodes: 70 (Galaxy/Sky One); 493 (BBC1; including 12 specials)

Production
- Producers: David G. Taylor (Series 1, 3–4); Roger Ordish (Series 2)
- Running time: 30 minutes (One False Move; Series 1–4, 7–9); 25 minutes (Series 5–6)
- Production company: Action Time

Original release
- Network: Galaxy/Sky One
- Release: 1 October 1990 – 10 January 1992
- Network: BBC One
- Release: 25 May 1994 – 3 December 2002

Wipeout is a British television quiz show based on the original American programme of the same name. It originally aired on the digital channel Galaxy and later on Sky One under the name One False Move from 1 October 1990 to 10 January 1992 before it made its terrestrial premiere on BBC One on 25 May 1994. The last episode aired on 3 December 2002.

== Format ==
During the game, correct answers would be replaced on the board by a golden star on a black circle, whereas "wipeouts" (in other words, wrong answers) would be replaced by the blue and yellow Wipeout "W". This was used in the Daniels version. In the Monkhouse version, likely for clarity reasons, green ticks were used to represent correct answers and red Xs represented wipeouts. On One False Move, correct answers were replaced with a "10" (symbolising 10 points per answer), and incorrect answers displayed the word "FALSE".

Three boards were played in round one, with £10 awarded for the first answer plus an additional £10 for each subsequent correct answer (up to £110 for the eleventh). In the first four series, a toss-up question on the buzzer was asked before each board with the player who answered correctly gaining initial control of that board. In the Monkhouse version, only two boards were played and each correct answer was worth £50. Any contestant who hit a wipeout in round one lost all money they had accumulated to that point.

In round one on the first four series, each of the three boards featured a mystery prize hidden behind any one answer. The prize would be determined based on whether it was hidden behind a correct answer or a wipeout. If it was hidden behind a wipeout, the player was awarded a cheap prize, usually one to do with the answer (e.g. a can of oil and a lollipop). If it was hidden behind a correct answer, the player was awarded a much better prize (e.g. designer handbags). The contestant who revealed the prize kept it regardless of the game's outcome.

A tiebreaker was not played at the end of round one should a tie present itself. Instead, the player to proceed was the one who had given the most correct answers up to that point. If this was also tied, the player with the fewest wipeouts was accepted into round two.

Round two was known as the 'Wipeout Auction' (or called 'One To One' on One False Move). The contestants would be offered a subject, and twelve possible answers on the grid. Eight of these would be correct, and four of these would be wipeouts. The contestant with the highest amount of money would have the opportunity to bid first on how many correct answers they think they could find in the grid, or to pass the opening bid onto their opponent. Whoever offered the highest bid was given the opportunity to choose that number of answers. The player remained in control until they had achieved the number of correct answers with which they won the bid, or until they hit a wipeout. If they hit a Wipeout, the opposing player would only have to get one answer right to head into the next round; play switches back to the first player if the second player also discovers a wipeout. The first player to win two boards went through to the bonus game. On One False Move, stars would be shown for correct answers.

For the bonus game (called the 'Monkhouse Minute', only on the daytime version) the contestant had to select six answers and submit those answers via an enter button, which would then display on the board how many correct answers they had selected. They could then modify their selection and try again. To win, they had to have all 6 correct answers selected when pressing the enter button, and they had to complete the game within 60 seconds. The game ended with them either correctly identifying the six correct answers, in which case they won the star prize; or with time running out, in which case they didn't win the star prize, but kept their earlier winnings. The star prize was usually a holiday abroad. On Paul Daniels' version, players entered their answers on a keypad, and ran to press the enter button next to the game board. On Bob Monkhouse's version, and on One False Move, players inputted their selections with buttons under the screen, and the enter button (referred to by Bob Monkhouse as 'Bob's Button') was next to the host. Daniels did the running on the contestant's behalf on several occasions (i.e. for a wheelchair user, or for a pregnant contestant). The contestants were told in advance where the holiday would be in the Daniels era, but when Monkhouse took over, they could choose where they wanted to go provided that it was within Europe.

== Transmissions ==
=== Galaxy/Sky One ===
Series	Start date	End date	Episodes
1	1 October 1990	10 January 1992	70

=== BBC One ===
==== Series ====
Series	Start date	End date	Episodes
1	25 May 1994	23 September 1994	16
2	30 September 1994	24 February 1995	16
3	3 March 1995	10 November 1995	20
4	17 November 1995	3 January 1997	20
5	16 February 1998	26 June 1998	67
6	24 August 1998	26 November 1999	80
7	3 January 2000	4 May 2000	80
8	2 October 2000	1 June 2001	100
9	3 September 2001	3 December 2002	97

==== Specials ====
Celebrity specials were aired from 1998 to 2000.

Date	Celebrities
21 December 1998	Joe Pasquale, Cleo Rocos and Bernard Cribbins
22 December 1998	Gloria Hunniford, Nick Owen and Kate Robbins
23 December 1998	Barbara Dickson, John Inman and June Whitfield
29 December 1998	Roy Walker, Ruth Madoc and Gary Wilmot
30 December 1998	Faith Brown, Andy Kane and Bryan Murray
31 December 1998	Adrian Mills, Nerys Hughes and Nickolas Grace
1 January 1999	Jim Bowen, Anna Walker and Paul Ross
29 March 1999	Cheryl Baker, Nicholas Parsons and Floella Benjamin
30 March 1999	Sarah Greene, William Roache and Jilly Johnson
31 March 1999	Jenny Powell, Les Dennis and Chris Jarvis
18 December 2000	Jean Boht, Joe Pasquale and Louise Jameson
19 December 2000	Bobby Davro, Toyah Willcox and Nick Weir
