= Marblehead Manor =

American television series

- Created by: Bob Fraser; Rob Dames
- Starring: Paxton Whitehead; Linda Thorson; Phil Morris; Michael Richards; Bob Fraser; Dyana Ortelli
- Country of origin: United States
- Original language: English
- No. of seasons: 1
- No. of episodes: 24

Production
- Production companies: Dames-Fraser-Gary Nardino Productions; Paramount Television

Original release
- Network: Syndication
- Release: September 19, 1987 – May 28, 1988

Marblehead Manor is an American sitcom that originally aired in first-run syndication from September 19, 1987, to May 28, 1988. It starred Paxton Whitehead, Phil Morris, Linda Thorson, Bob Fraser and Michael Richards. The series was a Dames-Fraser Production in association with Paramount Television.

== Premise ==
The series concerned the goings on at the estate of the wealthy, eccentric Randolf Stonehill, heir to a corn oil fortune, and involved long-suffering butler and head of the household staff Albert, who'd known Randolf when they were children; groundskeeper Rick who had eyes for maid Lupe; chauffeur Jerry; handyman Dwayne; and Randolf's materialistic, yet good-hearted wife Hillary. Rounding out the cast was Lupe's mischievous son Elvis.

== Cast ==
- Paxton Whitehead as Albert Dudley
- Linda Thorson as Hillary Stonehill
- Phil Morris as Jerry Stockton
- Rodney Scott Hudson as Dwayne Stockton
- Bob Fraser as Randolf Stonehill
- Dyana Ortelli as Lupe
- Humberto Ortiz as Elvis
- Michael Richards as Rick

== Episodes ==
| No. | Title | Directed by | Written by | Original release date |
|---|---|---|---|---|
| 1 | "Diamond in the Roughage" | Shelley Jensen | Paul K. Taylor | September 19, 1987 |
Randolph buys a diamond ring to give to his wife on her birthday. He asks Albert to keep it out of her sight, and Albert misplaces it. The staff must find it before Randolph asks for it.
| 2 | "Puppy Love" | Rob Dames | Unknown | September 26, 1987 |
Rick secretly gives Hilary a puppy named Albert, and soon the staff think Hilary is having a love affair with Albert the butler.
| 3 | "Madame Butterfat" | Rob Dames | Bobby Fine | October 3, 1987 |
A visiting opera singer (Wendie Jo Sperber) mistakenly believes Albert has a crush on her after she receives an anonymous love letter. The letter was not from Albert, but he must play along.
| 4 | "Safe at Home" | Rob Dames | Bob Fraser & Rob Dames | October 10, 1987 |
Albert hears a rumor that he is about to be fired, so he writes and gives a caustic letter of resignation to the Stonehills. When he finds out the rumor was false, he must get the letter back before anyone reads it.
| 5 | "Good Impressions" | Rob Dames | Story by : Howard Ostroff; Teleplay by : Bob Fraser & Rob Dames | October 17, 1987 |
To entertain an unexpected guest Albert impersonates Randolph, unaware of the fact that the man is a potential business associate of Randolph. Everyone at the manor becomes someone else.
| 6 | "The Fondle Workout" | Rene Auberjonois | Don Hart | October 24, 1987 |
Lupe learns that Hillary wants to have a baby. She becomes convinced that Jerry is the chosen father.
| 7 | "Full Dress" | Bill Foster | Steven Kunes | October 31, 1987 |
The body of Randolph's recently deceased cousin is delivered to the manor just as the staff is preparing for the Stonehills' anniversary party. Albert must oversee the party and a funeral.
| 8 | "I Led Three Wives" | Whitney J. LeBlanc | Ken Eulo & Barbara Azrialy | November 7, 1987 |
Having led the Stonehills into believing he is married, Dwayne talks Jerry into becoming his pretend wife when they ask to meet her.
| 9 | "All in a Knight's Work" | Rob Dames | Unknown | November 14, 1987 |
In order to impress Hilary, Randolph decides to stage a burglary in which he will catch the crooks and save the day. Things don't go as planned, and Hillary ends up saving the day.
| 10 | "Egg MacGuffin" | Rob Dames | Unknown | November 21, 1987 |
Randolph decides to auction off a jeweled egg which Albert gave him as collateral for a loan he never paid back. The egg is part of the Dudley family.
| 11 | "An Aunt Hill for Hillary" | Rob Dames | Unknown | November 28, 1987 |
After a business venture fails, Randolph asks Hillary and Albert to play host to his hostile aunt. Her visit comes the same time a new pet llama arrives. The staff must keep the aunt happy or Randolph will lose his company.
| 12 | "Ballet Ruse" | Rob Dames | Unknown | December 5, 1987 |
KGB agents attempt to capture Rick, who is the exact double of a defecting Soviet ballet dancer. The KGB have orders to bring the dancer back to the USSR.
| 13 | "Tea for Tuba" | Lee Shallat | Unknown | January 30, 1988 |
While the Stonehills are on vacation, someone on the staff breaks a valuable urn. The staff decide to turn the manor into a hotel in order to raise enough money to replace the urn.
| 14 | "Star Struck" | Rob Dames | Bob Fraser & Rob Dames | February 6, 1988 |
A jealous Randolph arranges to chaperon a dinner that Hillary is having with an old flame of hers. The old flame is now a Hollywood hunk.
| 15 | "The Lady's Not for Spurning" | Rob Dames | Paul K. Taylor | February 13, 1988 |
Albert finds himself pursued by a vamp whom he once had a brief encounter with while on holiday in Hawaii.
| 16 | "Baby on Board" | Rob Dames | Don Hart | February 20, 1988 |
Rick is mystified by a toddler that Lupe had agreed to baby sit. He finds the child wandering around the manor, but thinks it's an alien.
| 17 | "Now, for a Re-Butle" | Shelley Jensen | Chip Hayes | February 27, 1988 |
With the Stonehills expecting important guests, Albert asks Jerry to fill in as butler so he can attend a wedding. Jerry does a great job, leaving Albert worried he may be replaced.
| 18 | "Chinny Chin Chum" | Rob Dames | Rob Dames & Bob Fraser | March 5, 1988 |
Randolph sends Rick out to pick up lunch for his guests, but Rick returns with a pig that was stolen from a local college. The pig turns out to be the college mascot.
| 19 | "Randolph's Mom" | Shelley Jensen | Florence Peluso | April 23, 1988 |
The entire staff must think of a plan to prevent Randolph's mother from selling the manor.
| 20 | "Come Flu with Me" | Shelley Jensen | Harriett Weiss & Patt Shea | April 30, 1988 |
Hilary and Albert must run the entire manor themselves when everybody else has come down with the flu.
| 21 | "Amusing Grace" | Rob Dames | Rob Dames & Bob Fraser | May 7, 1988 |
Rick decides to withdraw himself from high society after once again embarrassing Hilary in public.
| 22 | "Button Your Beau" | Bill Foster | Ronald J. Fields | May 7, 1988 |
An old lover of Lupe's shows up at the manor, and it turns out he was involved at one time with Hilary.
| 23 | "Gorilla My Dreams" | Rene Auberjonois | Courtney Burr & Frank Rehwaldt | May 21, 1988 |
Rick takes Randolph's place in an ape suit to attend the Stonehills' masquerade party, there is a real ape that escaped also hanging around the manor.
| 24 | "If You Knew Sushi" | Shelley Jensen | Story by : Nick Gore & Jerry Jacobius and Harriett Weiss & Patt Shea; Teleplay by : Harriett Weiss & Patt Shea | May 28, 1988 |
Albert plays the part of a Geisha girl when the manor is turned into a Japanese tea house for one of Randolph's clients.

== Broadcast ==
This show was part of NBC's "Prime Time Begins at 7:30" campaign, in which the network's owned-and-operated stations would run first-run sitcoms in the 7:30–8:00 pm time slot to counter program competing stations' game shows, sitcom reruns and other offerings. The experiment turned out to be a largely unsuccessful one, as only one of the series was a hit while three of the remaining four were canceled after their only season. Marblehead Manor was one of the three that failed to make it to a second season.

=== Stations ===
| City | Station |
|---|---|
| Bangor | WVII-TV 7 |
| Beaumont | KFDM-TV 6 |
| Buffalo | WUTV 29 |
| Charlotte | WJZY 46 |
| Chicago | WMAQ-TV 5 |
| Cleveland | WBFF 45; WKYC 3 |
| Columbus | WTTE 28 |
| El Paso | KVIA-TV 7 |
| Los Angeles | KNBC-TV 4 |
| New York | WNBC-TV 4 |
| Orlando | WESH 2 |
| Richmond | WVRN-TV 63 |
| Spokane | KAYU-TV 28 |
| Shreveport | KTBS-TV 3 |
| Toledo | WUPW 36 |
| Washington, D.C. | WRC-TV 4 |
| Wichita | KSAS-TV 24 |

== In popular culture ==
- The show is referenced in season 3, episode 4 of The Golden Girls, "Blanche's Little Girl". In one scene, Rose Nylund asks if Blanche Devereaux is upset because of a fight she had with her daughter. Dorothy Zbornak sarcastically responds, "No, Rose, she's upset because Marblehead Manor is only on once a week."
- In the season 8 Newhart episode “Cupcake in a Cage”, Larry notes that “Timing is everything in a farce, hence the failure of Marblehead Manor.”
