= Bill Foster (director) =

American television director (1932–2011)

- Born: April 7, 1932; Augusta, Georgia, U.S.
- Died: February 2, 2011 (aged 78); Los Angeles, California, U.S.
- Other name: Billy Ray Foster
- Occupation: Television director
- Years active: 1964-1990
- Spouse(s): Lynn, ?-2011, his death
- Children: 2 daughters, Julia and Susan, 1 son, Michael

Billy Ray "Bill" Foster (April 7, 1932 – February 2, 2011) was an American television director known for his work with sitcoms. His credits, which spanned more than fifty years and encompassed hundreds of hours, included episodes of Full House, Sanford and Son, Amen, Marblehead Manor and You Again?.

Foster directed the 1967 pilot episode of Rowan & Martin's Laugh-In, which earned him the only Emmy nomination of his career. Foster went on to direct the television broadcasts of the 23rd and 24th Primetime Emmy Awards in 1971 and 1972 respectively. He also directed the AFI Life Achievement Award: A Tribute to James Cagney in 1974, for which he won a Directors Guild of America Award in 1975.

In 1986, Foster directed the live syndicated special, The Mystery of Al Capone's Vaults, which was hosted by Geraldo Rivera. The special, which advertised the potential to find the secrets of Al Capone buried in a vault beneath the Lexington Hotel in Chicago, turned up very little.

Foster spent much of his career directing television sitcoms, especially during the 1970s and 1980s. He directed 43 episodes of the sitcom, Benson, between 1982 and 1986. Foster also directed 36 separate episodes of NBC's Amen, which starred Sherman Hemsley and Clifton Davis, between 1986 and 1989. Foster largely retired after directing 23 episodes of the ABC television series, Full House, from 1989 to 1990.

Foster had a wife, Lynn, with whom he had three children, Julia, Susan and Michael. He died of cancer on February 2, 2011, in Los Angeles, California, at the age of 78.
