= Eulodrobia =

Scientific classification
- Kingdom: Animalia
- Phylum: Mollusca
- Class: Gastropoda
- Subclass: Caenogastropoda
- Order: Littorinimorpha
- Superfamily: Truncatelloidea
- Family: Tateidae
- Genus: Eulodrobia; Ponder, W.-H. Zhang, Hallan & Shea, 2019

Type species
- Jardinella eulo Ponder & G. A. Clark, 1990

Genus of gastropods

Eulodrobia is a genus of small freshwater snails, aquatic gastropod mollusks in the family Tateidae.

== Species ==
- Eulodrobia bundoona Ponder, W.-H. Zhang, Hallan & Shea, 2019
- Eulodrobia carinata Ponder, W.-H. Zhang, Hallan & Shea, 2019
- Eulodrobia eulo (Ponder & G. A. Clarke, 1990)
- Eulodrobia fenshami Ponder, W.-H. Zhang, Hallan & Shea, 2019
- Eulodrobia ovata Ponder, W.-H. Zhang, Hallan & Shea, 2019
- Eulodrobia spirula Ponder, W.-H. Zhang, Hallan & Shea, 2019
