= Wipeout (1988 game show) =

American first-run syndicated game show (1988-1989)

- Genre: Game show
- Created by: Bob Fraser
- Directed by: Jerome Shaw
- Presented by: Peter Tomarken
- Announcer: Jim Hackett; Robert Ridgely; John Harlan
- Theme music composer: Otis Conner
- Country of origin: United States
- No. of episodes: 195

Production
- Executive producers: Rob Dames; Bob Fraser
- Producer: Bill Mitchell
- Production locations: Paramount Pictures Studios; Stage 30; Hollywood, California
- Running time: approx. 22–26 minutes
- Production companies: Dames-Fraser Productions; Paramount Domestic Television

Original release
- Network: Syndication
- Release: September 12, 1988 – June 9, 1989

Wipeout is an American game show that aired from September 12, 1988, to June 9, 1989 in syndication. The show, hosted by Peter Tomarken, was a presentation of Dames-Fraser Productions and distributed by Paramount Domestic Television.

== Main game ==
=== First round ===
Three contestants competed on each episode. Initially, each game featured three new contestants. After several weeks, a returning champion and two new contestants competed.

The contestants were given a category and shown 16 possible answers on a four-by-four grid of monitors. Eleven answers were correct, while the five incorrect ones were referred to as "wipeouts". The contestant in the leftmost position began the game and selected one of the sixteen answers. If correct, the contestant could either choose to give another answer or pass to the next contestant in line. Each correct answer was worth an increasing amount of money, with the first correct answer earning $25 and each subsequent one being worth $25 more, up to $275 for the eleventh and final answer. However, if the contestant chose an answer that was a wipeout, he/she lost control and any money accumulated during his/her turn.

One of the eleven correct answers was the "Hot Spot", offering a bonus prize. Once the Hot Spot was uncovered, Tomarken placed a token and placed it on the desk of the contestant that found it. In order to win the Hot Spot prize, a contestant had to both be in possession of the token at the end of the round and have a high enough score to advance to the Challenge Round. If the contestant holding the Hot Spot uncovered a wipeout, the token was taken away and another answer was designated as the Hot Spot.

The round ended once all eleven correct answers were found or if all five wipeouts had been selected. The two contestants with the highest money totals kept their earnings and continued on, while the third place contestant left with consolation prizes. If there was a tie for low score, the tied contestants were given a new category and shown 12 answers (eight correct, four wipeouts). They alternated choosing one answer at a time, with a coin toss to decide who would start, and the first contestant to find a wipeout was eliminated. If all eight correct answers were found, the contestant who gave the last one advanced.

=== Challenge round ===
The two remaining contestants advanced to the Challenge Round, playing for a bonus prize and to become the day's champion.

For each category in the Challenge Round, the contestants were shown a board with 12 answers, eight correct and four wipeouts, and they bid back and forth as to how many correct answers they thought they could name. Bidding ended when one contestant either reached the maximum of eight or challenged the other. If the high bidder successfully completed the bid, he/she won the board. One mistake allowed the opponent a chance to steal the board by giving one of the remaining correct answers still on the board. If the opponent could not do so, the high bidder was given another chance to fulfill his/her bid.

The Challenge Round was played as a best two-of-three. The high scorer from the first round started the bidding on the first (and, if necessary, third) board, while his/her opponent led off for the second.

=== Bonus round ===
In the bonus round, the champion faced a grid of twelve monitors, six of which displayed answers that fit into a specific category. The champion was given sixty seconds to find them, making selections by touching each monitor to light them. Once six monitors were lit, the champion ran to a buzzer to lock them in. If all six of the choices were correct, the champion won a car. If not, he/she was told how many answers were correct and went back to the board to make changes, which required the champion to turn off any previously lit monitors before selecting new ones.

The process continued until the champion either found all six correct answers to win the car or ran out of time. Beginning with the introduction of carryover champions later in 1988, a contestant would be able to continue as champion until either being defeated or winning the bonus round.

== Broadcast ==
Reruns of the series later aired on the USA Network from 1989 to 1991.

The first 40 episodes also aired on Canadian network GameTV from 2018-2019.

== International versions ==
Country	Local name	Host	Network	Premiere	Finale
Australia	Wipeout	Tony Johnston	Seven Network	February 15, 1999	November 24, 2000
Chile	Concurso la Tomboleta (Segment on Sabado Gigante)	Don Francisco	Canal 13	1989	1989
Germany	Riskier Was!	Gundis Zámbó	Sat.1	1993	1995
Greece	Risko	Giorgos Polychroniou	Mega Channel	1995	1997
Indonesia	Sapu Bersih	Harry de Fretes	TPI	1997	1998
Netherlands	Denktank	Kas van Lersel	RTL 4	1994	1999
Netherlands	Denktank	Kas van Lersel	RTL 5	1994	1999
Netherlands	Denktank	Kas van Lersel	Veronica	1994	1999
Norway	Askeladden	Finn Schau	TV 2	September 7, 1992	June 11, 1993
Spain	Alta Tensión	Constantino Romero	Antena 3	September 14, 1998	1999
Spain	Alta Tensión	Luis Larrodera	Cuatro	2006	2008
Spain	Alta Tensión	Christian Gálvez	Telecinco	August 2, 2021	September 10, 2021
Spain	Alta Tensión	Christian Gálvez	Cuatro	September 13, 2021	October 31, 2022
Spain	Alta Tensión	Iñaki Urrutia	Telemadrid	January 20, 2025	February 13, 2025
Spain	Tensión sin Limite	Ivonne Reyes	Veo7	January 24, 2011	March 24, 2011
Spain	Alta Tensió	Nelo Gómez	À Punt	February 12, 2024	July 12, 2024
United Kingdom	One False Move	Andy Craig	Galaxy	October 1, 1990	January 10, 1992
United Kingdom	One False Move	Andy Craig	Sky One	October 1, 1990	January 10, 1992
United Kingdom	Wipeout	Paul Daniels	BBC1	May 25, 1994	December 3, 2002
United Kingdom	Wipeout	Bob Monkhouse	BBC1	May 25, 1994	December 3, 2002
