= Ken Eulo =

American screenwriter

Ken Eulo (born November 17, 1939) is a Eugene O'Neill Award-winning writer and bestselling author whose novels have collectively sold over 13 million copies worldwide.

Born in Newark, New Jersey, Eulo was raised in nearby Nutley and graduated in 1957 from Nutley High School. He received his theater training at the Pasadena Playhouse and Heidelberg University.

== Career ==
Eulo's began his career in New York City, in the 1970s, as a playwright. In the 1980s, he received national recognition with his first horror book series The Brownstone Trilogy. Since its publication in October 1980, the series has developed a cult following. His success was followed by the novels Nocturnal, The Ghost of Veronica Gray, Manhattan Heat, Claw and The House of Caine. During the same decade Eulo moved to Los Angeles where he worked as a writer for television shows, including Small Wonder, Marblehead Manor, and Benson.

Eulo relocated to Orlando, Florida in the 1990s where he founded and has served as the artistic director for the New York Acting Ensemble. The repertory company consists of writers, directors, and actors. They regularly produce touring shows and host regular performances in the Orlando area. Several notable company members have included founding managing director Curt Nichols, writer Daniel Corey and actor Creagen Dow
