= David G. Taylor =

David G. Taylor has worked as a senior producer and director for the BBC. He is a member of the Advisory Council of the National College of Music.
