= Eulodrobia eulo =

Conservation status
- Vulnerable (IUCN 2.3)

Scientific classification
- Kingdom: Animalia
- Phylum: Mollusca
- Class: Gastropoda
- Subclass: Caenogastropoda
- Order: Littorinimorpha
- Family: Tateidae
- Genus: Eulodrobia
- Species: E. eulo

Binomial name
- Eulodrobia eulo (Ponder & Clark, 1990)

Synonyms
- Jardinella eulo Ponder & G. A. Clark, 1990 (basionym)

Species of gastropod

Eulodrobia eulo is a species of small freshwater snails which have an operculum, aquatic gastropod molluscs in the family Tateidae.

This species is endemic to Australia.

== See also ==
- List of non-marine molluscs of Australia
