= Rob Dames =

American film director

Rob Dames (born June 13, 1944) is an American writer, director and producer from St. Louis, Missouri.

== Productions ==
He started his career in the film industry in 1977, with credits including The Love Boat, Benson, Marblehead Manor and Full House. He was involved in the rewriting of The Flintstones and Casper for Amblin Entertainment, as well as Snow Dogs for Disney. In Europe, he provided consulting services for Heil Honey I'm Home! and Ritas Welt. He has published one novel: One Ball Each.
