= Bob Fraser (TV producer) =

American actor and producer

- Born: January 31, 1945; New York City, U.S.
- Died: July 12, 2011 (aged 66); Los Angeles, California, U.S.
- Occupations: Film producer; Actor; Screenwriter
- Known for: Benson

Bob Fraser (January 31, 1945 – July 12, 2011) was an American television producer, writer and actor.

Fraser's most notable work is on the TV show Benson, where he played a recurring role as state senator Tyler for 6 seasons, in addition to serving as a story editor, writer, and later producer of the series (along with partner Rob Dames).

After Benson, Fraser and Dames formed their own production company in 1987. Aligning their company with Paramount Television, Dames-Fraser Productions first produced Marblehead Manor, a weekly syndicated sitcom with Fraser in the cast. NBC's owned-and-operated stations carried the sitcom as part of a scheme to draw more viewers to its prime-time lineup, which Marblehead Manor and four other sitcoms (airing on different days) immediately preceded in the 7:30 p.m. timeslot. After Marblehead Manor and three of the other four series failed after one season, Fraser created the game show Wipeout, which debuted in September 1988 with Peter Tomarken as host; Wipeout was canceled at the end of the 1988–89 season and Fraser and Dames dissolved the production company and the partnership.

Fraser and Dames later were supervising producers on Full House and later worked on other television series and specials.

Fraser had cancer and died on July 12, 2011, aged 66.
