= Benson (TV series) =

American television sitcom (1979–1986)

- Genre: Sitcom
- Created by: Susan Harris
- Starring: Robert Guillaume; James Noble; Inga Swenson; Missy Gold; René Auberjonois; Ethan Phillips; Caroline McWilliams; Didi Conn; Lewis J. Stadlen; Billie Bird
- Theme music composer: George Tipton
- Composer: George Aliceson Tipton
- Country of origin: United States
- Original language: English
- No. of seasons: 7
- No. of episodes: 158 (list of episodes)

Production
- Executive producers: Paul Junger Witt; Tony Thomas; Susan Harris
- Running time: 24–25 minutes
- Production company: Witt/Thomas/Harris Productions

Original release
- Network: ABC
- Release: September 13, 1979 – April 19, 1986

Related
- Soap

Benson is an American television sitcom that originally ran on ABC for seven seasons, from September 13, 1979, to April 19, 1986. The show stars Robert Guillaume in the title role of Benson DuBois, the head of the household for Governor Eugene X. Gatling, played by James Noble. The show focused on the conflicts and relationships within the Governor's household, with Benson generally providing the sarcastic voice of reason. Inga Swenson, Missy Gold, Didi Conn, Ethan Phillips, and René Auberjonois all played long-term supporting roles.

The series was a spin off of Soap in which the character Benson first appeared as the wise-cracking yet level-headed African-American butler for the highly dysfunctional Tate family. However, Benson avoided the soap opera format of its parent series for a more conventional sitcom structure, and the lead character eventually moved from his service position to a role as lieutenant governor. The series was created by Susan Harris, and produced by Witt/Thomas/Harris Productions. In 1985, Guillaume won an Emmy Award for Outstanding Lead Actor in a Comedy Series for his role in the series. 158 episodes were produced.

== Plot ==
Benson DuBois (Robert Guillaume) is hired to be the head of household affairs for widowed Governor Eugene X. Gatling (James Noble) and his daughter Katie (Missy Gold). Governor Gatling was a cousin of Jessica Tate (Katherine Helmond) from Soap.

Benson faces housekeeping dilemmas and interacts with German cook Gretchen Kraus (Inga Swenson) and John Taylor (David Hedison; later Lewis J. Stadlen) who assists Governor Gatling as chief of staff. After Season 1, John Taylor leaves and the governor's new chief of staff is Clayton Endicott III (René Auberjonois).

The governor's press secretary Pete Downey (Ethan Phillips) is introduced in Season 2, and Benson's secretary Denise Stevens (Didi Conn) is introduced in Season 3. They later marry, having a child in the show's fifth season. Both were then written out, with the reason given that Denise secured a job with NASA.

Benson works his way up the ladder during the series, going from head of household affairs to state budget director and eventually is elevated to the position of Lieutenant Governor. Finally, Benson runs for governor against Gatling.

=== Series finale ===
The term-limited Governor Gatling runs for re-election as an independent candidate with Benson securing the party nomination, setting the stage for the two to go head-to-head in the general election.

At the end of the series' final episode, Benson and Gatling—who had strained relations due to the race—make peace with each other and watch the tight election returns together on television. As the broadcaster begins to announce that a winner is at last being projected, the episode ends on a freeze frame of Benson and Gatling, leaving the series with an unresolved cliffhanger. Coincidentally, Guillaume's previous series (Soap, from which Benson spun off) was also cancelled with unresolved cliffhangers.

In 2007, Benson executive producer Bob Fraser said that the season ended on a cliffhanger at the request of the network. The show was cancelled after the cliffhanger had already aired. Fraser indicated that, if the show had been renewed for another season, Gatling would have won the election and Benson would have become a United States senator.

According to Gary Brown who directed the finale and 20 other episodes of Benson, three different outcomes were filmed: with Benson winning, Gatling winning, and a tie. The intent was to decide over summer break which outcome to use. Brown also stated that regardless of the outcome, the long-term intent for the next season was for Benson to become the governor.

== Cast and characters ==
=== Main ===
- Robert Guillaume as Benson DuBois, the main character, hired as head of household affairs for Governor Gatling and his daughter Katie. Quick-witted and quick-thinking, Benson has helped the governor on several issues, bailing him out of tight political and public situations.
- James Noble as Eugene X. Gatling, the widowed and scatterbrained (but well-meaning) governor. Gatling has a penchant for telling off-the-wall stories, which Benson (and everyone else in the household) dreads.
- Inga Swenson as Gretchen Kraus, the governor's chef. A fiercely proud German immigrant, she is often at odds with Benson and trades insults with him. A running gag in the series was whenever she would walk out of the room, under his breath, Benson would cast one last barb toward Kraus, to which she shouted from off-stage, "I he-e-e-ear you-u-u-u!". Despite their rivalry, Benson and Kraus become close friends. She later becomes Benson's strongest supporter when he runs for governor against Gatling.
- Missy Gold as Katie Gatling, the governor's pre-teen daughter.
- Lewis J. Stadlen as John Taylor, Governor Gatling's chief of staff (season 1 only), played by David Hedison in the pilot episode.
- Caroline McWilliams as Marcy Hill, the governor's personal secretary (seasons 1 and 2, first three episodes of season 3). She is Benson's closest friend in the mansion and often confides in him. Frequently unlucky in love, Marcy eventually marries and leaves the governor's employ very early in season 3.
- Didi Conn as Denise Stevens, Marcy's sweet-natured, cheerfully naive replacement (from season 3, episode 3 through season 5, with guest appearances in season 6).
- Ethan Phillips as Pete Downey, Gatling's frequently high-strung press secretary (seasons 2 through 5, with guest appearances in season 6).
- René Auberjonois as Clayton Endicott III; he replaced Taylor as Gatling's chief of staff beginning in season 2. Clayton is very snobbish and high-handed—even more so than his predecessor, Taylor. He is also a hypochondriac.
- Billie Bird as Rose Cassidy; she becomes Gatling's chef partway through season 6 when Kraus is promoted to Benson's administrative assistant.

=== Recurring ===
- Jerry Seinfeld played a small role as Frankie, a delivery boy and unsuccessful comedian, for three episodes in 1980 (all early in season 2). He was asked to leave because of creative differences.
- Ed Peck was seen in four episodes in seasons 2-3, as Police Captain Dennis McDermott, usually investigating strange, sometimes serious occurrences at the governor's mansion.
- Bob Fraser, who was a writer/producer on Benson through its entire run, appeared occasionally in seasons 5-7 as Senator Leonard Tyler, a duplicitous sometimes-ally, sometimes-rival of both Benson and Governor Gatling.
- Donna LaBrie played Senator Diane Hartford in four season 7 episodes. She became Benson's fiancee.

== Episodes ==
Season	Episodes	Originally released		Rank	Rating
Season	Episodes	First released	Last released	Rank	Rating
1	24	September 13, 1979	May 8, 1980	23	20.6
2	22	October 31, 1980	May 22, 1981	59	16.4
3	22	November 6, 1981	May 14, 1982	63	—N/a
4	22	October 22, 1982	March 31, 1983	43	—N/a
5	22	September 16, 1983	May 4, 1984	39	16.3
6	24	September 21, 1984	April 5, 1985	33	15.5
7	22	October 4, 1985	April 19, 1986	74	10.0

== Broadcast history ==
Season	Time slot
1 (1979–1980)	Thursdays at 8:30–9:00 pm ET on ABC
2 (1980–1981)	Fridays at 8:00–8:30 pm ET on ABC
3 (1981–1982)	Fridays at 8:00–8:30 pm ET on ABC
4 (1982–1983)	Fridays at 8:00–8:30 pm ET on ABC (October 22, 1982 – March 25, 1983); Thursday at 8:00–8:30 pm ET on ABC (March 31, 1983 - April 27, 1983))
5 (1983–1984)	Fridays at 8:00–8:30 pm ET on ABC
6 (1984–1985)	Fridays at 8:00–8:30 pm ET on ABC (September 21, 1984 – February 22, 1985); Fridays at 9:00–9:30 pm ET on ABC (March 15 – April 5, 1985)
7 (1985–1986)	Fridays at 9:30–10:00 pm ET on ABC (October 4, 1985 – January 3, 1986); Saturdays at 8:30–9:00 pm ET on ABC (January 18 – April 19, 1986)

== Home media ==
On July 24, 2007, Sony Pictures Home Entertainment released Season 1 of Benson on DVD in Region 1.

On April 3, 2012, Sony released season 2 on DVD.

On August 27, 2013, Mill Creek Entertainment announced it had acquired the rights to various television series from the Sony Pictures library including Benson. They re-released the first and second seasons on DVD on September 2, 2014.

DVD name	Ep #	Release date
The Complete First Season	24	July 24, 2007
The Complete Second Season	22	April 3, 2012

== Setting ==
The exterior shots of the "governor's mansion" are actually of a private home located at 1365 South Oakland Avenue in Pasadena, California.
