= Full House =

American television sitcom (1987–1995)

- Genre: Sitcom
- Created by: Jeff Franklin
- Showrunners: Jeff Franklin (1987–92); Marc Warren (1993–95); Dennis Rinsler (1993–95)
- Directed by: Joel Zwick; Various (seasons 1–2 and 4–8)
- Starring: John Stamos; Bob Saget; Dave Coulier; Candace Cameron; Jodie Sweetin; Mary-Kate and Ashley Olsen; Lori Loughlin; Andrea Barber; Scott Weinger; Blake Tuomy-Wilhoit; Dylan Tuomy-Wilhoit
- Theme music composer: Jesse Frederick; Bennett Salvay; Jeff Franklin
- Opening theme: "Everywhere You Look" by Jesse Frederick
- Ending theme: "Everywhere You Look" (instrumental)
- Composers: Jesse Frederick; Bennett Salvay
- Country of origin: United States
- Original language: English
- No. of seasons: 8
- No. of episodes: 192 (list of episodes)

Production
- Executive producers: Jeff Franklin; Thomas L. Miller; Robert L. Boyett; Dennis Rinsler (1992–95); Marc Warren (1992–95)
- Producers: Don Van Atta; James O'Keefe; Bonnie Bogard Maier; Greg Fields
- Production locations: Lorimar Studios, Stage 28 in Culver City, California (1987–93); Warner Bros. Studios, Stage 24 in Burbank, California (1993–95)
- Camera setup: Videotape, multi-camera
- Running time: 21–25 minutes
- Production companies: Jeff Franklin Productions; Miller-Boyett Productions; Lorimar-Telepictures (season 1); Lorimar Television (seasons 2–6); Warner Bros. Television (seasons 7–8)

Original release
- Network: ABC
- Release: September 22, 1987 – May 23, 1995

Related
- Fuller House

Full House is an American television sitcom created by Jeff Franklin for ABC. The show is about the recently widowed father Danny Tanner who enlists his brother-in-law Jesse Katsopolis and childhood best friend Joey Gladstone to help raise his three daughters, D. J., Stephanie, and Michelle, in his San Francisco home. It originally aired from September 22, 1987, to May 23, 1995, with a total of eight seasons consisting of 192 episodes.

While never a critical success, the series was consistently in the Nielsen Top 30 (from season two onward) and continues to have an audience in syndicated reruns, and is also aired internationally. One of the producers, Dennis Rinsler, called the show "The Brady Bunch of the 1990s". For actor Dave Coulier, the show represented a "G-rated dysfunctional family".

A sequel series, Fuller House, premiered on Netflix in February 2016 and ran for five seasons, concluding in June 2020.

== Plot ==
After the death of his wife Pam, sports anchor Danny Tanner recruits his rock musician brother-in-law (Pam's younger brother), Jesse Katsopolis, and stand-up comedian Joey Gladstone, his best friend since childhood, to help raise his three young daughters in San Francisco—D. J., Stephanie, and Michelle. Over time, the three men, as well as the girls, bond and become closer to one another.

In season two, Danny is reassigned from his duties as a sports anchor by his television station to become co-host of the morning show, Wake Up, San Francisco, and is teamed up with Nebraska native Rebecca Donaldson. Jesse and Rebecca ("Becky") eventually fall in love and get married in season four. In season five, Becky gives birth to twin sons, Nicholas ("Nicky") and Alexander ("Alex").

== Main cast ==
- John Stamos as Jesse Katsopolis (Note: The character's surname was changed from "Cochran" to "Katsopolis" after the first season ended.)
- Bob Saget as Danny Tanner
- Dave Coulier as Joey Gladstone
- Candace Cameron as D. J. Tanner
- Jodie Sweetin as Stephanie Tanner
- Mary-Kate and Ashley Olsen as Michelle Tanner (recurring season 1; seasons 2–8)
- Lori Loughlin as Rebecca Donaldson Katsopolis (recurring season 2; seasons 3–8)
- Andrea Barber as Kimmy Gibbler (recurring seasons 1–4; seasons 5–8)
- Scott Weinger as Steve Hale (guest seasons 5 and 8; seasons 6-7)
- Blake and Dylan Tuomy-Wilhoit (Note: Daniel and Kevin Renteria portrayed the characters in Season 5.) as Nicky and Alex Katsopolis (recurring season 5; seasons 6–8)

== Production ==
=== Casting ===
John Posey as Danny Tanner in the unaired pilot (shown with Sweetin and Cameron as Stephanie and D. J.)

The producers' first choice to play the character of Danny Tanner was Bob Saget. Saget was not available to appear in the pilot due to his commitment as an on-air contributor to CBS' The Morning Program. The producers instead cast actor John Posey to play Danny. Posey only appeared in the show's unaired pilot; which is included on the DVD release of Season 1.

John Stamos's character was originally named Jesse Cochran; Stamos reportedly wanted his character to better reflect his Greek heritage, so producers decided to change the character's surname to Katsopolis (beginning with season two).

Twins Mary-Kate Olsen and Ashley Olsen were cast to alternate in the role of Michelle during tapings. The girls were jointly credited as "Mary Kate Ashley Olsen" in seasons two through seven because the producers did not want audiences to know that the Michelle character was played by twins. The sisters occasionally appeared together in fantasy sequences. Full House was one of the few shows on TV where a baby character grew up in front of the cameras, with viewers witnessing all the development stages of the twin actresses. Saget recalled he would often get complaints from the child actresses' mothers for making inappropriate jokes. Jodie Sweetin was spotted in a guest spot on the show Valerie. Lori Loughlin was hired in 1988 for a six-episode romance plot with Uncle Jesse but ended up staying until the end of the show.

All seven of the original cast members remained with the show through its entire eight-year run, with five characters added to the main cast along the way. D. J. (Candace Cameron)'s best friend Kimmy Gibbler (Andrea Barber) was a recurring character in seasons one through four, who was upgraded to a regular in season five. Loughlin's character Rebecca Donaldson originally appeared for six episodes in season two; producers decided to expand her role and made her a regular the following season. After marrying Jesse, they have twins Nicky and Alex, who make their debut in season five. As babies, the children were played by Daniel and Kevin Renteria, and in season six, the roles of the twins were succeeded by Blake and Dylan Tuomy-Wilhoit. The last main character added was Steve Hale, who was D. J.'s boyfriend in seasons six and seven. He was played by Scott Weinger.

=== Taping ===
The series was created by Jeff Franklin and executive produced by Franklin, along with Thomas L. Miller and Robert L. Boyett. The series was produced by Jeff Franklin Productions and Miller-Boyett Productions, in association with Lorimar-Telepictures (1987–1988), Lorimar Television (1988–1993), and then by Warner Bros. Television (1993–1995) after Lorimar was folded into Warner Bros.' existing television production division.

Although the series was set in San Francisco, the sitcom itself was taped at the Lorimar Studios in Culver City, California, and Warner Bros. Studios in Burbank, California. Outside of certain excerpts in the opening title sequences, including Alamo Square Park's Painted Ladies, the only episode to have actually been taped in San Francisco was the first episode of season eight, "Comet's Excellent Adventure". There were also a few episodes which were filmed on-location elsewhere, most notably Hawaii in the season three premiere "Tanner's Island", and at Walt Disney World for the two-part sixth-season finale "The House Meets the Mouse".

The series experienced heavy turnover with its writing staff throughout its run. The first season in particular had at least three writing staff changes, with Lenny Ripps (who remained with the show until the early part of the fourth season, by then serving as a creative consultant) and Russell Marcus being the only writers surviving the changes through the entire season. Show creator and executive producer Jeff Franklin was the only writer to remain with the series throughout its entire eight-season run (Franklin also wrote and directed several episodes during the first five seasons). Marc Warren and Dennis Rinsler joined the series' writing staff in the second season as producers and remained with the show until its 1995 cancellation; Warren and Rinsler took over as head writers by season five and assumed showrunning duties as executive producers for the sixth season to allow Franklin to focus on Hangin' with Mr. Cooper (Full House served as Cooper's lead-in when the former aired on Tuesday nights during the 1992–93 season).

=== Theme song ===
The show's theme song, "Everywhere You Look", was performed by Jesse Frederick, who co-wrote the song with writing partner Bennett Salvay and series creator Jeff Franklin. Various instrumental versions of the theme song were used in the closing credits; the version used during seasons three through eight was also used in the opening credits in some early syndication runs, although the song was almost always truncated to the chorus for broadcast. Seasons one through five used a longer version of the theme song. In syndicated airings, the line "you miss your old familiar friends, but waiting just around the bend" replaced the lines starting with "how did I get to livin' here, somebody tell me please..." (after ABC Family acquired the series in 2003, it became the first television outlet to air the long versions of the theme since the series' ABC run, which were included only in select episodes from the first five seasons, whereas the full version was used in most episodes during those seasons). Hallmark Channel reruns have used four different cuts of the theme song, including the full version.

=== Cross-marketing ===
ABC used the show to launch other family sitcom hits throughout the early 1990s on Fridays and other evenings such as Home Improvement, Family Matters and Hangin' with Mr. Cooper.

Dave Coulier sold the Mr. Woodchuck puppet he made on the show to the toy store Toys "R" Us.

== Episodes and ratings ==
Full House originally aired on Fridays from September 1987 to August 1991, which spanned the show's first four seasons, and later became the flagship program of ABC's newly launched TGIF block in September 1989. The show was briefly moved to Tuesdays during the 1987–88 season and then aired twice a week on Tuesdays and Fridays for a few months in order to help the series build an audience. It remained on Fridays permanently for the next three seasons, as the show's ratings increased. Full House was moved to Tuesdays full-time for season five and remained there until the series ended in 1995. While the show's first season was not very successful, finishing 71st that year, mostly because it was a new series placed in an 8 p.m. Eastern timeslot (most freshman series start out in protected time slots preceded by successful lead-ins), the show quickly became popular during its second season as it was placed immediately following the established hit show Perfect Strangers (which was also produced by Tom Miller and Bob Boyett). From season three onwards, it was ranked among Nielsen's Top 30 shows (a ratings increase which allowed the series to move back to Fridays at 8 p.m.). By the fourth season, the series jumped to the Top 20 and remained there until the seventh season (the series peaked at the top ten during seasons five and six).

In 1995, despite the fact the show was still rated in the top 25, ABC announced that it was canceling the show after eight seasons due to the increasing costs of producing the series. By the end of the show, the average cost of one episode was $1.3 million. Plans to move Full House to The WB network fell through. The one-hour series finale was watched by 24.3 million viewers, ranking No. 7 for the week and attracting a 14.6 household rating and a 25 percent audience share.

Season	Episodes	Originally released		Rank	Rating
Season	Episodes	First released	Last released	Rank	Rating
1	22	September 22, 1987	May 6, 1988	71	10.9
2	22	October 14, 1988	May 5, 1989	28	15.5
3	24	September 22, 1989	May 4, 1990	21	15.3
4	26	September 21, 1990	May 3, 1991	14	16.1
5	26	September 17, 1991	May 12, 1992	8	17.4
6	24	September 22, 1992	May 18, 1993	10	15.8
7	24	September 14, 1993	May 17, 1994	16	14.4
8	24	September 27, 1994	May 23, 1995	24	12.5

== "Very special episodes" ==
Full House included many episodes featuring particularly heavy topics in their plots. In the 1970s and 1980s, when a series featured serious episodes, they were known as "Very special episodes".

- "Aftershocks" (season 3, episode 11)
  - Stephanie goes to therapy after experiencing trauma-induced anxiety from an earthquake. The episode aired shortly after the actual 1989 Loma Prieta earthquake, and was meant to help Bay Area children dealing with anxiety in its aftermath.
- "Shape Up" (season 4, episode 8)
  - D. J. develops an eating disorder anticipating Kimmy's upcoming pool party.
- "The Volunteer" (season 5, episode 7)
  - While volunteering at a nursing home, D. J. befriends a man with Alzheimer's disease and accidentally takes him off premises to her home to see an in-home dog show.
- "Silence is Not Golden" (season 6, episode 17)
  - Stephanie's friend, Charles, is getting abused by his father. He confides in Stephanie, and she initially keeps his secret, but she eventually tells Uncle Jesse to get him help.
- "Fast Friends" (season 7, episode 5)
  - Stephanie's friends peer pressure her to smoke cigarettes.
- "The Last Dance" (season 7, episode 17)
  - Michelle is charmed by Jesse's grandfather (her great-grandfather) who arrives from Greece for a visit. Unfortunately, this visit is short-lived as Papouli dies in his sleep from old age at the Tanner household.
- "Under the Influence" (season 8, episode 10)
  - Kimmy attempts to drive drunk after attending a fraternity party and D. J. stops her, causing tension in their friendship.

== American syndication ==
Warner Bros. Television Distribution handles the domestic and international syndication rights to the series. During the summer of 1991, reruns of the early seasons began airing in a daily daytime strip on NBC. Starting in September 1991, Warner Bros. Domestic Television Distribution began distributing Full House for broadcast in off-network syndication and was syndicated on various local stations nationwide until 2003.

The series previously aired on TBS, WGN America, Nick at Nite, ABC Family (now FreeForm), TV Land, The N/TeenNick, CMT, and Hallmark Channel.

In 2014, episodes have averaged 1.5 million viewers on Nick at Nite, which is up 7 percent from 2013 and a 0.4 rating in the key 18–49 demographic, up 8 percent from 2013.

On September 29, 2017, Hulu acquired the streaming rights to Full House along with fellow Warner Bros. Television productions Family Matters, Hangin' with Mr. Cooper, Perfect Strangers and Step by Step in addition to Disney-ABC Domestic Television productions Boy Meets World, Dinosaurs and Home Improvement.

On October 1, 2021, Full House began streaming on HBO Max after its streaming rights expired from Hulu but has since returned to the Hulu platform. The series was removed on HBO Max on September 30, 2025.

On January 12, 2022, the show began airing on the classic TV network MeTV, moving to sister network Catchy Comedy the following year.

Since 2022, the show has aired (intermittently) on GAC Family.

== Critical reception ==
Despite the show's popularity and being a 1980s–1990s classic among audiences and families, critics' reviews for Full House were mostly negative, especially early on.

Writing in 1987, the year of its debut, Howard Rosenberg of Los Angeles Times mocked it as "not playing with a full deck. It oozes and blubbers for a half hour, yielding no laughs or life. You need a Geiger counter to detect its pulse." He added: "It strives to beat out CBS for second place in the ratings. But this contrived muck isn't one of them. In fact, its entire premise of shared witless fatherhood (a la My Two Dads on NBC) is a great argument for birth control." John J. O'Connor of The New York Times wrote: "And so it goes, one predictable situation following another, with the actors frantically trying to keep the patient [the infant] from becoming a full-fledged corpse." Tom Shales of The Washington Post defended it: "Critics are supposed to rend teeth and gnash clothing when a show like Full House catches on, but why? The new ABC sitcom seems to follow at least one basic, if often ignored, rule of television: First, do no harm."

Critics revisiting the series after the 2016 debut of Fuller House have been similarly harsh. Willa Paskin wrote for Slate that the series was "a hackneyed and saccharine family sitcom". Isaac Feldberg opined that it was "archetypally average, hiding behind a ubiquitous laugh track and obnoxiously on-the-nose life lessons." Josh Kurp of Uproxx described the show as "comfortingly bland. . . . a bowl of white rice, spaghetti with no butter or sauce, eggs served on Saltines. You could live off it,... but you wouldn't want to." Josh Jackson wrote in a positive review: "Full House: The absolute definition of the 'family sitcom' in the late '80s/early '90s. Unlike the Blossoms of the era, Full House wasn't about the 'very special episode'; it was just wholesome, family friendly entertainment all the time, which has become all the more humorous in the years that followed as former viewers learned just how foul-mouthed Bob Saget could be in literally any other context. This, though, was the television equivalent of cotton candy: airy, saccharine, and totally insubstantial. Even if you watched a ton of Full House episodes, I'll bet you barely remember the full plot of any of them."

== Reunions ==
During Bob Saget's final season as host of America's Funniest Home Videos, six other Full House cast alumni (John Stamos, Dave Coulier, Candace Cameron, Jodie Sweetin, Andrea Barber, and Lori Loughlin) reunited on the May 9, 1997, episode (the episode which preceded Saget's final episode as host of that series).

In a December 2008 news story, it was reported that John Stamos was planning a reunion movie. This idea was quickly withdrawn, because reportedly most of the cast was not interested. In 2009, Stamos announced that a feature film based on the show was still planned. Stamos told The New York Daily News, "I'm working on a movie idea, but it wouldn't be us playing us. I'm not 100% sure, but it would probably take place in the first few years." Stamos posited Steve Carell and Tracy Morgan for the roles of Danny and Joey respectively.

In 2012, eight of the Full House cast members reunited in Los Angeles for their 25th anniversary. Publicists for Mary-Kate and Ashley Olsen said that they "weren't able to attend, given their work schedules."

On July 19, 2013, the original Jesse and the Rippers (the band which Jesse Katsopolis served as frontman until he was voted out in season 8) reunited on Late Night with Jimmy Fallon. The group performed a medley of covers including the Beach Boys' "Forever", Elvis Presley's "Little Sister", "Hippy Hippy Shake", and ending with the Full House theme "Everywhere You Look". Bob Saget and Lori Loughlin made cameo appearances.

In January 2014, Coulier, Saget, and Stamos appeared on Late Night with Jimmy Fallon as their characters. Catchphrases and "The Teddy Bear" were included in the skit. Stamos, Saget and Coulier also appeared together in a 2014 commercial for Dannon Oikos Greek Yogurt (for which Stamos serves as spokesperson) that debuted during Super Bowl XLVIII, days after their appearance on Late Night.

=== Sequel series ===
In August 2014, reports circulated that Warner Bros. Television was considering a series sequel. John Stamos, who has an ownership stake in the show, headed up the attempt to get the series back into production. Netflix closed a deal to produce a 13-episode sequel series tentatively titled Fuller House, with many of the original series cast members reprising their roles. Notably, Mary-Kate and Ashley Olsen both declined to reprise the role of Michelle in the first season, although the creators and producers said they could still possibly appear in future seasons. Stamos would guest star as well and serve as producer.

Filming began on July 25, 2015. Like the original series, the show is set in San Francisco. The original series idea was focused on D. J., a veterinarian struggling to raise three boys Jackson (Michael Campion), Max (Elias Harger) and Tommy Jr. (Dashiell and Fox Messitt) after her firefighter husband Tommy Fuller is killed in the line of duty; Stephanie, an aspiring musician; and Kimmy, who is a party planner and a single mother to a teenage daughter, Ramona (Soni Nicole Bringas). The show's premise follows one similar to the original series when Stephanie makes plans to put her career on hold for a while and move in with D. J. to help take care of her children. Almost immediately afterward, Kimmy makes the same offer for her and Ramona to move in and help out. Netflix premiered the series on February 26, 2016, with the premiere episode featuring a Tanner family reunion. After five seasons, the series concluded on June 2, 2020.

== Other media ==
=== Home media ===
Warner Home Video released all eight seasons of the series on DVD in Region 1 between 2005 and 2007. A complete series box-set containing all 192 episodes was released on November 6, 2007. As of 2016, the complete series is available for purchase via online retailers such as Amazon. Additionally, all seasons + the complete series were also released in Region 4 but only the first five seasons were released on DVD in Region 2 with the fifth season being sold solely on Amazon and printed on DVD±R-Discs only.

Title	Region 1	Region 2	Region 4
The Complete First Season	February 8, 2005	2007 (Re-Released in 2013)	November 16, 2005
The Complete Second Season	December 6, 2005	2007 (Re-Released in 2013)	April 5, 2006
The Complete Third Season	April 4, 2006	2007 (Re-Released in 2013)	August 9, 2006
The Complete Fourth Season	August 15, 2006	2007 (Re-Released in 2013)	September 5, 2007
The Complete Fifth Season	December 12, 2006	July 3, 2013 (Available on Amazon only, Out of Print)	June 3, 2014
The Complete Sixth Season	March 27, 2007	—N/a	June 3, 2014
The Complete Seventh Season	August 7, 2007	—N/a	June 3, 2014
The Complete Eighth Season	November 6, 2007	—N/a	June 3, 2014
The Complete Series	November 6, 2007	—N/a	June 3, 2014

All seasons of Full House are available on Amazon Prime Video in various countries and with different languages.

=== Book series ===
Books based on Full House are geared toward children primarily between the ages of 8 and 14. Warner Bros., which holds the rights to Full House and its associated characters, would not permit others to use their characters and selected who could write books based on the television series.

The series includes the following:

- Full House Stephanie: These 33 books were written from the point of view of the Tanners' middle daughter, Stephanie Tanner. They take place with Stephanie in a different middle school, likely because of a slightly different redistricting plan compared to the one mentioned in season seven's "Fast Friends". She has different best friends as well, Allie Taylor and Darcy Powell. Though these are book creations, she has known Allie since kindergarten, and there are several places in the first five seasons of Full House where fans think an unnamed extra could be Allie. This series begins with Stephanie being pressured to join a clique called the Flamingos, by completing a series of dares. She almost does the last one, though she is not sure if she wants to before D. J. catches her trying to steal Danny's phone card. Stephanie explains tearfully what was happening, and D. J. helps her to understand what the Flamingos were really up to: they wanted to use the phone card to call their boyfriends. Stephanie and the Flamingos become fierce rivals. Hip Hop Till You Drop, Two for One Christmas Fun, and Ten Ways to Wreck a Date are the most popular.
- Full House Michelle: These 40 stories are told from Michelle's point of view. The first 27 feature more of her, and the other Tanners', home life than others, though some focus on events at school, whereas the last 14, the "Michelle and Friends" series, focuses mostly on Michelle and her classmates. Unlike Stephanie, Michelle goes to the same elementary school but is in a different class. Two stories were translated and published in Japan in February 2007. Super special My Best Friend is a Movie Star came out in September 1996, and along with The Substitute Teacher and How to be Cool are the most popular.
- Full House Sisters: These 14 books focus on Michelle and Stephanie's friendship and comical situations that occur between them. The sisters often alternate points of view in the story.
- Full House: Dear Michelle: These four books were published several years after the others stopped being produced. They take place with Michelle in the third grade, where she writes an advice column for her class paper.
- Club Stephanie: 1997–2001 revival series with Stephanie and her friends.

=== Russian adaptation ===
In 2006, Full House was one of a group of Warner Brothers properties licensed to Moscow-based network STS for adaptation to Russian. The show, Topsy-Turvy House (Дом кувырком) followed the plots of the American version with changes to accommodate cultural differences. It ran for two seasons, beginning in 2009.

=== The Unauthorized Full House Story ===
On August 22, 2015, a television movie called The Unauthorized Full House Story was first released by Lifetime. It tells the behind-the-scenes story of the series.

== Accolades ==
Young Artist Awards				
Year	Category	Nominee(s)	Result	Ref.
1989	Best Young Actress Under Ten Years of Age in Television or Motion Pictures	Jodie Sweetin	Nominated	
1989	The Most Promising New Fall Television Series		Nominated	
1990	Best Young Actor/Actress Under Five Years of Age	Mary-Kate Olsen and Ashley Olsen	Won	
1990	Best Family Television Series		Nominated	
1990	Best Young Actress Starring in a Television Comedy Series	Candace Cameron	Nominated	
1990	Young Artist Award for Outstanding Young Comedienne in a Television Series	Jodie Sweetin	Nominated	
1991	Best Young Actress Starring in a Television Series	Jodie Sweetin	Won	
1991	Best Young Actress Starring in a Television Series	Candace Cameron	Nominated	
1991	Best Young Actress Supporting Role in a Television Series	Andrea Barber	Won	
1991	Outstanding Performance by an Actress Under Nine Years of Age	Mary-Kate Olsen and Ashley Olsen	Won	
1992	Best Young Actress Supporting or Recurring Role for a TV Series	Andrea Barber	Won	
1992	Best Young Actress Starring in a Television Series	Candace Cameron	Nominated	
1992	Outstanding Young Comedienne in a Television Series	Jodie Sweetin	Nominated	
1993	Exceptional Performance by a Young Actress Under Ten	Mary-Kate Olsen and Ashley Olsen	Won	
1993	Best Young Actress Co-starring in a Television Series	Andrea Barber	Nominated	
1993	Exceptional Performance by a Young Actor Under Ten	Tahj Mowry	Nominated	
1993	Outstanding Young Ensemble Cast in a Television Series		Nominated	
1994	Best Young Actress Starring in a Television Series	Candace Cameron	Nominated	
1994	Outstanding Young Comedienne in a Television Series	Jodie Sweetin	Nominated	
1994	Best Young Actress Co-starring in a Television Series	Andrea Barber	Nominated	
1994	Best Young Actor Guest-starring in a Television Series	R. J. Williams	Nominated	
1995	Best Youth Actor Guest-starring in a Television Show	J. D. Daniels	Nominated	
1996	Best Youth Comedienne in a TV Show	Andrea Barber	Nominated	
