= Bands and musicians from Yorkshire and North East England =

The following is a list of bands and musicians from the North East and Yorkshire of England, by town or city. Those to have a number one single are shown in bold.

== Bands and musicians ==
=== A–B ===
Ashton-under-Lyne

- Fivepenny Piece

Barnsley

- Danse Society
- Exit Calm
- Party Day
- Hands Off Gretel
- Kate Rusby
- Saxon
- The Bar-Steward Sons of Val Doonican
- Dave Burland

Batley

- Robert Palmer

Benton

- Jimmy Nail

Bingley

- Marmozets

Bolton upon Dearne

- The Sherlocks

=== Bradford ===
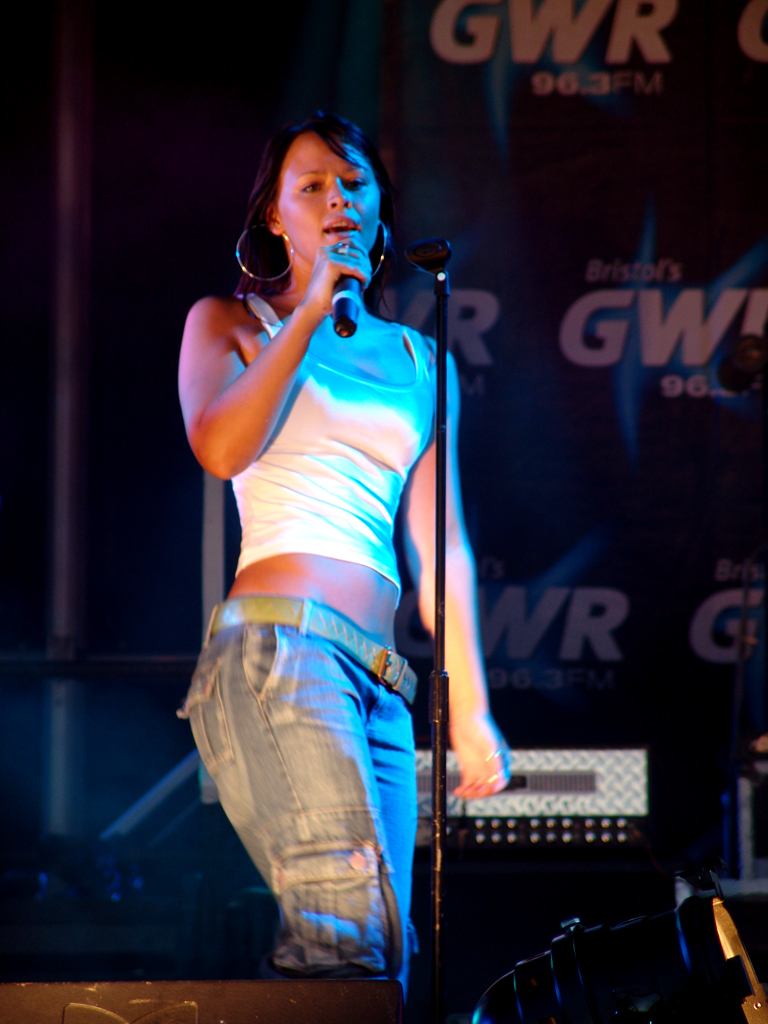
Bradford's Kimberley Walsh performs with Girls Aloud.

- Anti System
- Tasmin Archer
- The Cult
- Kiki Dee
- Susan Fassbender
- Fun-Da-Mental
- Gareth Gates
- Allan Holdsworth
- Natalia Kills
- Zayn Malik
- Chantel McGregor
- Melissa Steel
- My Dying Bride
- New Model Army
- Smokie
- Southern Death Cult
- Benson Taylor
- Terrorvision
- Kimberley Walsh (from Girls Aloud)

=== B–D ===
Bridlington

- Ben Parcell

Brighouse

- Brighouse and Rastrick Brass Band (attained No. 2 position in the charts, the highest ever for a brass band)
- Embrace

Consett

- Ruth Copeland, soul and blues singer
- Susan Maughan

Darlington

- Vic Reeves (as in Vic Reeves and Bob Mortimer - see Middlesbrough)
- We Start Fires

Dewsbury

- Bob Hardy (bassist from Franz Ferdinand)
- Joel Graham (bassist from Evile)

Doncaster

- Tony Christie
- Groop Dogdrill
- Tiny Dancers (from South Elmsall)
- Louis Tomlinson
- The Wallbirds
- Yungblud

Durham

- Gem Archer (guitarist with Oasis)
- Martha (from Pity Me)
- Prefab Sprout (from Witton Gilbert)
- Voorhees
- Trevor Horn (of The Buggles)

=== H–K ===
Halifax

- Nick Holmes
- Don Lang
- Paradise Lost
- Ed Sheeran
- Richard Bedford
- The Orielles

Harrogate

- Acid Reign
- Blood Youth
- Stuart Colman
- Karl Culley
- Fig.4.0
- The Harrogate Band
- Garry Jennings
- Little Angels
- Daniel Schwarz. Daniel and Otto Schwarz were travelling bandleaders who performed mainly in Harrogate.
- Otto Schwarz.
- Sulk
- Utah Saints
- Wally
- Mark Wharton
- Workshed

Helmsley

- One Night Only

Huddersfield

- Evile
- Kava Kava
- O'Hooley & Tidow
- John McCoy (bassist with Gillan, McCoy & G.M.T.)
- Sore Throat

Keighley

- Skeletal Family

=== Kingston upon Hull ===
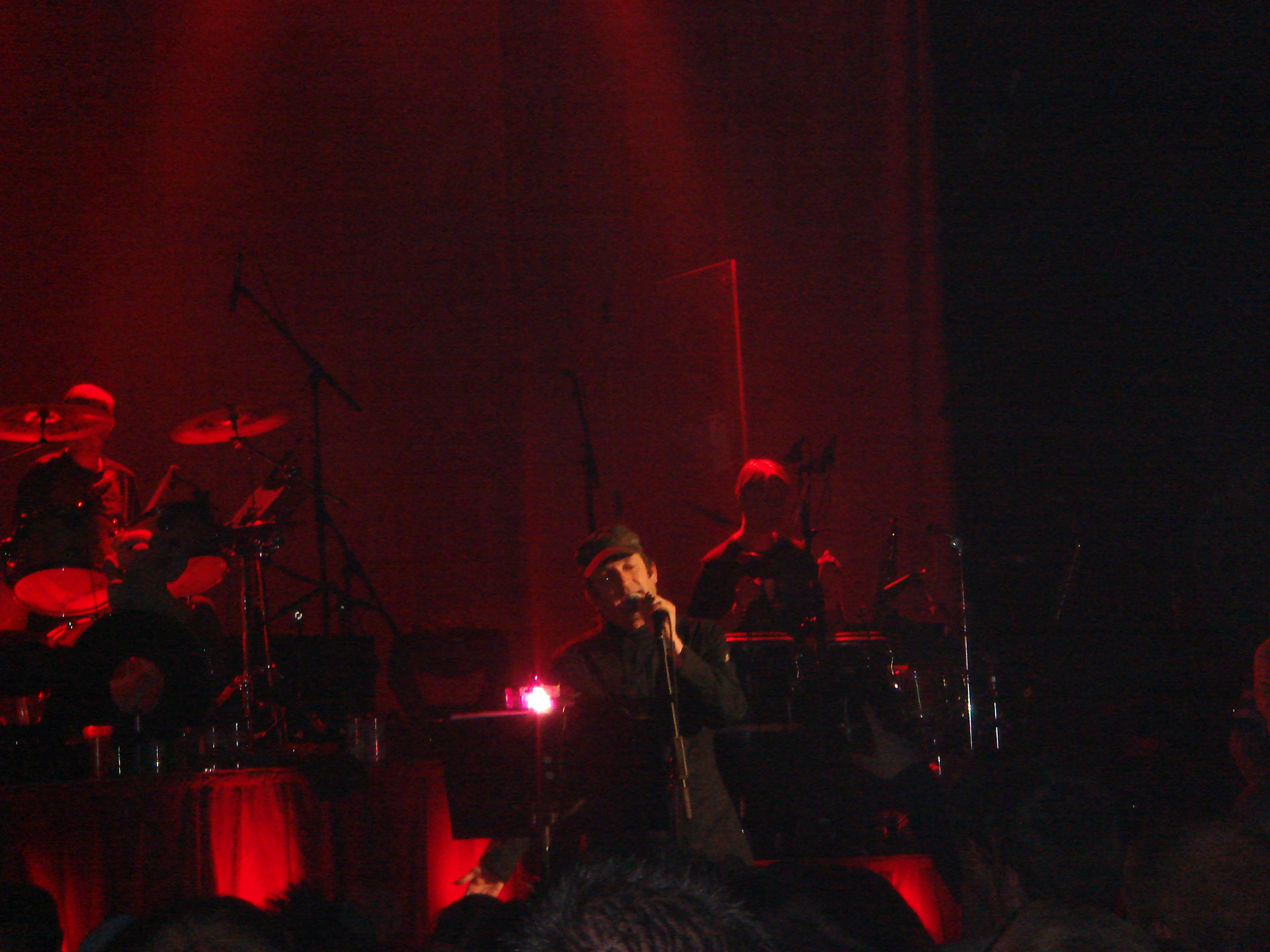
The Beautiful South in concert

- The Beautiful South
- Biscuit Boy (a.k.a. Crackerman) (Paul Heaton's solo act)
- COUM Transmissions
- The Cutler
- Everything but the Girl (Formed in Hull by two students who were from elsewhere)
- Fila Brazillia
- Fonda 500
- Roland Gift (from Fine Young Cannibals)
- The Heights of Abraham
- Hey, Rube!
- Ronnie Hilton (following his demobilisation in 1947, he took work as a fitter in Leeds)
- Homespun (band formed by Dave Rotheray, formerly of The Beautiful South)
- The Housemartins
- J*S*T*A*R*S
- Kingmaker
- Nyam Nyam
- The Paddingtons
- The Rats
- Red Guitars
- Mick Ronson (best known for work with David Bowie – see Tadcaster)
- Sade (formed in London but three of the five members were Hull natives)
- Salako
- Salem
- Scarlet
- Spacemaid
- Throbbing Gristle
- Trevor Bolder (David Bowie's Spiders From Mars with Mick Ronson, Uriah Heep, Wishbone Ash)
- Lal Waterson
- Norma Waterson
- The Watersons
- Infant Annihilator

=== Leeds ===
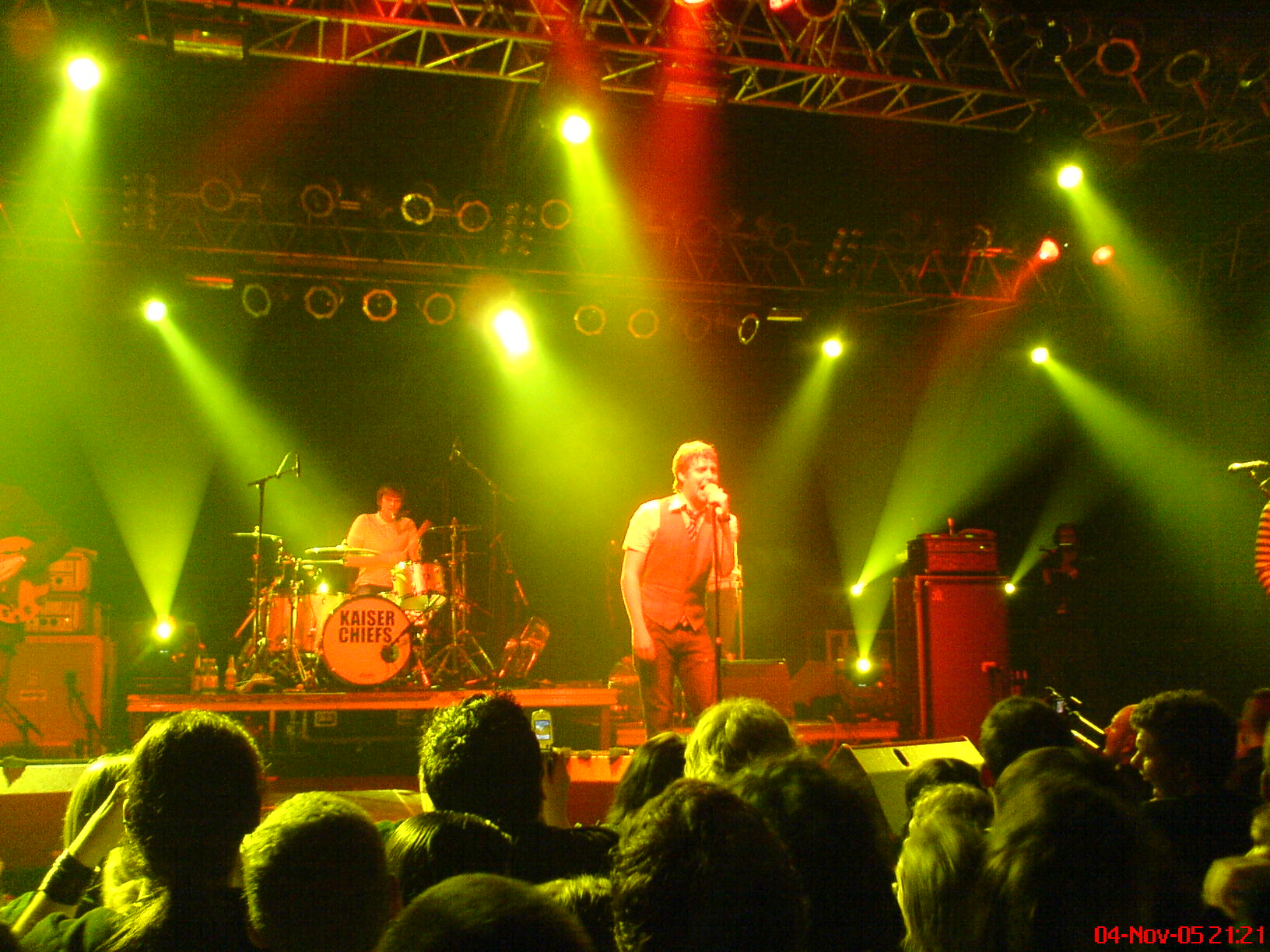
The Kaiser Chiefs

- Mark Abrahams
- Abrasive Wheels
- Age of Chance
- Alt-J
- Big Cheese
- Black Wire
- Castrovalva
- Michael Chapman
- The Chevin
- Christie
- Chumbawamba
- Classically Handsome Brutes
- Sean Conlon (member of Five)
- Cryptic Shift
- Cud
- Dead Disco
- Dinosaur Pile-Up
- Eagulls
- Embrace
- Eureka Machines
- The Expelled
- The Flex
- ¡Forward, Russia!
- Gang of Four
- Gentleman's Dub Club
- Girls at Our Best!
- Higher Power
- Hood
- I Like Trains
- Kaiser Chiefs
- The Lodger
- The March Violets
- The Mekons
- Mel B (solo and also of the Spice Girls)
- The Mission
- The Music
- The Pigeon Detectives
- Pulled Apart by Horses
- Corrine Bailey Rae
- Jason Rae (born in Aberdeen; lived in Leeds)
- Red Lorry Yellow Lorry
- Lou Rhodes
- Roller Trio
- Paul Ryan
- Scritti Politti
- Send More Paramedics
- Sigma
- The Sisters of Mercy
- Soft Cell
- Static Dress
- The Sunshine Underground
- Utah Saints
- The Wedding Present
- Your Vegas
- Tom Zanetti

=== Middlesbrough ===
- Amelia Lily
- James Arthur
- Black Wire
- Roy Chubby Brown
- The Chapman Family
- Collectors Club
- Chris Corner (also frontman of Hartlepool-based band Sneaker Pimps)
- David Coverdale (from nearby Saltburn, lead singer with Whitesnake)
- Vin Garbutt
- The Hangmen
- IAMX
- Journey South
- Maxïmo Park
- Misery Addict
- Bob Mortimer (as in Vic Reeves and Bob Mortimer- see Darlington)
- Chris Rea
- Paul Rodgers (of **Free** and Bad Company)
- Space Raiders
- Jamie Tinkler (Eurovision, Pop Idol and X Factor contestant; member of boy/girl band POP!; two top twenty singles)
- Whitesnake

=== Newcastle ===
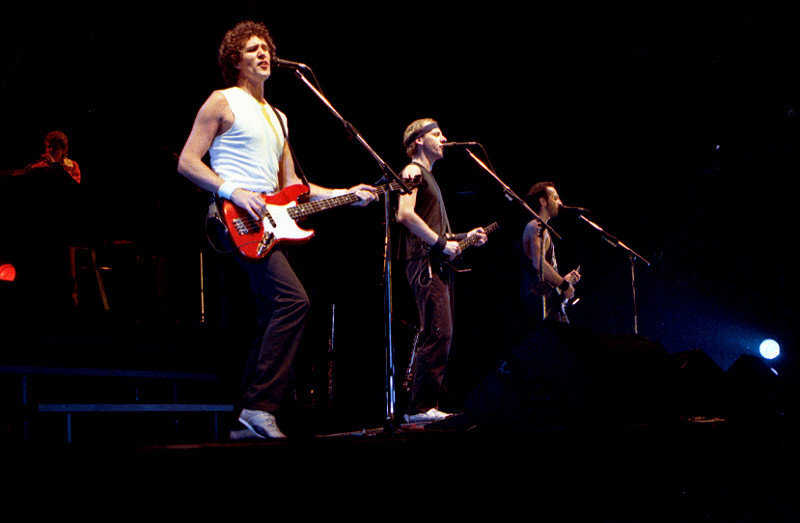
Dire Straits

- The Animals
- Sam Fender from nearby North Shields
- Cheryl Cole (of Girls Aloud)
- Dire Straits
- Drill
- Dubstar
- Geordie
- Hurrah!
- Jack the Lad
- Jade Thirlwall born at nearby South Shields
- Lee Jackson (of The Nice, Jackson Heights, and Refugee)
- Brian Johnson (of AC/DC and Geordie)
- Lighthouse Family
- Lindisfarne
- Maxïmo Park
- Chris McCormack (from 3 Colours Red)
- Peace Burial at Sea
- Perrie Edwards born at nearby South Shields
- Raven
- Spike
- Martin Stephenson
- Sting
- Andy Taylor (of Duran Duran; from nearby Cullercoats)
- Neil Tennant (of the Pet Shop Boys; born at nearby North Shields, schooled in Newcastle)
- Venom
- Bruce Welch and Hank Marvin (of The Shadows)
- The Wildhearts
- Kathryn Williams (originally from Liverpool; based in Newcastle after attending university there)
- Zoviet France
- yfriday

=== O–S ===
Ossett

- Black Lace (featured in the Bradford-set film Rita, Sue and Bob Too)

Ovingham

- China Drum

Ripon

- Billie Marten

Rotherham

- Nick Banks (from Sheffield band Pulp)
- Bring Me the Horizon (Drummer Matthew Nichols is from Maltby in Rotherham.)
- Jo Callis
- Jive Bunny and the Mastermixers
- Muse (Although actually formed in Teignmouth, Devon, bassist Chris Wolstenholme is from Rotherham.)

Rothwell

- The Pigeon Detectives

Ryton

- The Unthanks

Scarborough

- Little Angels

Settle

- John Newman

=== Sheffield ===
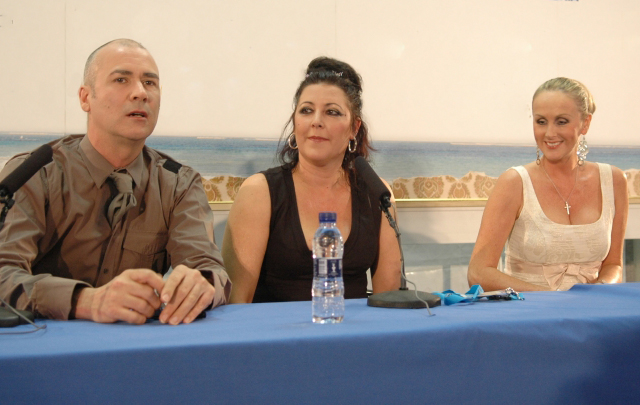
The Human League, July 2007: from left, Philip Oakey, Joanne Catherall, Susan Ann Sulley

- ABC
- Arctic Monkeys
- Babybird
- The Crookes
- Derek Bailey
- Dave Berry
- Black Spiders
- Bring Me the Horizon
- Bromheads Jacket
- Cabaret Voltaire
- Paul Carrack
- Chakk
- Tony Christie
- Clock DVA
- Jarvis Cocker
- Joe Cocker
- Comsat Angels
- Dead Sons
- Def Leppard
- The Dylans
- Richard Hawley
- Heaven 17
- The Heights of Abraham
- Hey, Rube!
- The Human League
- I Monster
- John Shuttleworth
- J*S*T*A*R*S
- Little Man Tate
- The Long Blondes
- Longpigs
- Paul Shaft
- Lucy Spraggan
- Malevolence
- Milburn
- Moloko
- Monkey Swallows the Universe
- Pulp
- Reverend and the Makers
- Rolo Tomassi
- Self Esteem
- Slow Club
- Stoney
- Thompson Twins
- While She Sleeps

=== S–T ===
Stakeford

- Darren Allison (drummer/producer with The Divine Comedy; also worked with My Bloody Valentine, Belle and Sebastian, and Spiritualized)

Sunderland

- Mark Brydon (of Moloko)
- Field Music
- Bob Fox
- The Futureheads
- The Golden Virgins
- The J.T.A
- Kane Gang
- Alex Kapranos (raised in Sunderland and South Shields)
- Kenickie
- Leatherface
- Nadine Shah
- Olive
- Dave Stewart (of the Eurythmics)
- The Toy Dolls
- Wodensthrone
- Frankie & the Heartstrings
- Don Airey (Key boards for various, presently Deep Purple )
- Emeli Sandé
- A Tribe of Toffs

Todmorden

- Keith Emerson
- John Helliwell (Supertramp)
- Geoff Love
- Working Men's Club

Tynemouth

- The Motorettes

=== W–Z ===
Wakefield

- Be-Bop Deluxe
- The Cribs
- Fiat Lux
- The Research
- Vardis
- Jane McDonald

Washington

- Bryan Ferry (of Roxy Music)
- Yourcodenameis:milo

Whitby

- Arthur Brown (of The Crazy World of Arthur Brown)

Whitley Bay

- Tygers of Pan Tang
- L Devine

=== York ===
- Asking Alexandria
- John Barry
- The Batfish Boys
- Benjamin Francis Leftwich
- Berri (singer)
- Glamour of the Kill
- Chris Helme
- Elliot Minor
- Mostly Autumn
- The Mood
- The Redskins
- RSJ
- The Seahorses
- Shed Seven
- The Smoke
- Supermoon
- Van Der Neer

== See also ==
- New Yorkshire
