= Fairview Studios =

UK recording studio

Coordinates: 53.7678923°N 0.6678188°W

Fairview Studios is an independent recording studio located in Willerby, East Riding of Yorkshire, England. Established by a local man Keith Herd in 1966, it has recorded musical acts such as Def Leppard, Mick Ronson, Red Guitars, Mostly Autumn and The Housemartins. Over the years the facility has become well respected within the music industry.

== History ==
Keith Herd (1936–2026) hailed from Holmpton, East Riding of Yorkshire, the son of a farmer. Inspired by the music of Bill Haley and Tommy Steele, Herd formed his own outfit The Keith Herd Quartet and in 1962, recorded a demo of them in his own home in Willerby. Their then vocalist, Dave Tenney, was signed to a recording contract by Dick James, although their collective musical ambitions faded. Tenney later sang part of the novelty song, "Star Trekkin'", by The Firm which reached number one in the UK Singles Chart in 1987. Herd continued playing music locally and worked for a local music shop as a service engineer. A move in 1965 to a house named Fairview in Willerby, proved the catalyst to turn towards recording music as a career. Beginning in one of his two front rooms in the house, Herd initially recorded mainly local acts. He noted "at the time I started there were no studios in Leeds or Sheffield – even up to 1978 there still wasn’t a professional studio in Sheffield". One of the earliest recordings at Fairview was undertaken by Johnny Small and The Little People, a group which featured both Herd and Rick Kemp.

Herd also worked for a while with his eventual lifelong friend, Basil Kirchin, on early experimental pieces.

Initially charging £2.00 per hour, despite his limited equipment and experience he taped many hours of material that was issued in 2008 on the compilation album, Front Room Masters – Fairview Studios 1966–1973. Herd still played semi-professionally until 1973, when he decided to concentrate all his efforts into the recording studio. Converting a barn in his back garden, the present day version of the studio was born.

Numerous varied musical acts utilised the premises down the years, with Roy Neave and John Spence joining as sound engineers. John Spence started in 1981 and has been the studio's chief engineer for the last 25 years, guiding the studio through its 50th anniversary in 2016. More recently, the Herd family moved to North Cave and run Fairview Duplication from that location.

== Selected notable recordings ==
Year	Artist	Single / EP / Album
1967	The Rats	"The Rise and Fall of Bernie Gripplestone"
1978	The Next Band	Four by Three
1979	Def Leppard	The Def Leppard E.P.
1980	Witchfynde	Give 'Em Hell
1980	Michael Chapman	Looking for Eleven
1980	Witchfynde	Stagefright
1982	Salem	"Cold As Steel" / "Reach to Eternity"
1983	Red Guitars	"Good Technology" / "Heartbeat Go! Love Dub"
1984	Tokyo Blade	Night of the Blade
1984	Red Guitars	Slow to Fade
1985	Fatal Charm	"You Know (You'll Never Believe)"
1985	Chrome Molly	You Can't Have It All....... Or Can You?
1986	The Sisterhood	Gift
1987	The Housemartins	"Build"
1990	Sally Barker	"Money's Talking"
1991	Uriah Heep	Different World
1993	Toy Dolls	Absurd-Ditties
1993	Fudge Tunnel	Creep Diets
1995	Toy Dolls	Orcastrated
1995	Bill Nelson	Practically Wired or How I Became... Guitarboy!
1996	Bill Nelson	Crimsworth (Flowers, Stones, Fountains and Flames)
1996	Bill Nelson	After the Satellite Sings
1997	Toy Dolls	One More Megabyte
1998	Mostly Autumn	For All We Shared...
1999	Mostly Autumn	Spirit of Autumn Past...
2001	Mostly Autumn	Music Inspired by The Lord of the Rings
2005	The Paddingtons	"50 to a Pound"
2008	Mostly Autumn	Glass Shadows
2008	Mostly Autumn	Pass the Clock
2012	Mostly Autumn	The Ghost Moon Orchestra
2014	Mostly Autumn	Dressed in Voices
2017	Mostly Autumn	Sight of Day
2020	Def Leppard	The Early Years 79 – 81

== Other recordings ==
Other notable musicians who have recorded music at Fairview include Barbara Dickson, Marty Wilde, Maddy Prior, The Glitter Band, The Beautiful South, Computerman, Shed Seven, XIII, Dumpvalve, Lithium Joe, Cannon and Ball, Kingmaker, The Farm, Bruce Foxton, Bill Nelson John Parr

== Compilation album ==
Year	Title	Included work by
2008	Front Room Masters – Fairview Studios 1966–1973	The Mandrakes, Michael Chapman, The Rats

== See also ==
- List of British recording studios
