= Wake Up Screaming =

Wake Up Screaming (or variants) may refer to:

== Books ==
- I Wake Up Screaming (novel) by Steve Fisher (writer), who co-wrote the film screenplay with Dwight Taylor

== Film ==
- I Wake Up Screaming 1941 film noir, with Betty Grable, Victor Mature and Carole Landis
- Wake Up Screaming: A Vans Warped Tour Documentary 2006 featuring band Strike Anywhere

== Music ==
=== Albums ===
- I Wake Up Screaming (album) Kid Creole & the Coconuts 2011
- Wake Up Screaming (Slick Shoes album) 2000
- Wake Up Screaming, album by F-Minus 2003
- Wake Up Screaming, album by Every Mother's Nightmare 1993
- Wake Up Screaming (Impaler album)
- Woke Up Screaming, album by Bobby Blue Bland 1974

=== Songs ===
- "Wake Up Screaming", song by Ray Manzarek (Manzarek, Danny Sugerman) from The Whole Thing Started with Rock & Roll Now It's Out of Control 1974
- "Wake Up Screaming", song by Witchfynde Give 'Em Hell (Witchfynde album) 1981
- "Wake Up Screaming", song by Wang Chung (band) 1985
- "I Wake Up Screaming", song by Cinerama (band) 2013
- "I Wake Up Screaming", song by Virgin Steele from The Marriage of Heaven and Hell Part I 1994
- "Wake Up Screaming", song by Paul Stanley Live to Win
- "Wake Up Screaming", song by Dive, written Ivens from Inside Out (Dive album) Box (Dive album) Images (EP) Scraping Tokyo '95
- "Wake Up Screaming", song by Subhumans From the Cradle to the Grave (album), covered by Queens of the Stone Age on First It Giveth
- "Wake Up Screaming", song by See You Next Tuesday from This Was a Tragedy EP 2005
- "Wake Up Screaming", song by Jim Lauderdale from the album Planet of Love 1991; covered by Gary Allan on Used Heart for Sale 1996
