= Heart Full of Sky =

Studio album by Mostly Autumn
- Released: 2006
- Recorded: 2006
- Genre: Rock
- Length: 68:58
- Label: Mostly Autumn Records
- Producer: Bryan Josh

Mostly Autumn chronology
Storms Over London Town (2006)	Heart Full of Sky (2006)	Glass Shadows (2008)

Professional ratings
Review scores
Source	Rating
DPRP	(9/10)

Heart Full of Sky is the seventh studio album from rock artists Mostly Autumn released in 2006. The limited edition double-CD version was only available via the band's official website, whereas the single-CD version is available as a general release. This is the first Mostly Autumn album to feature multi-instrumentalist Chris Johnson, and the first to feature Olivia Sparnenn as an official member. Also, it is the last album (until the 2017 release of Sight Of Day) to feature Angela Gordon, who left Mostly Autumn to look after her newborn baby, and Andrew Jennings, who left due to other commitments.

== Track listing ==
1. "Fading Colours" (Josh) – 8:27
2. "Half a World" (Findlay) – 4:50
3. "Pocket Watch" (Josh) – 4:20
4. "Blue Light" (Johnson) – 4:58
5. "Walk with a Storm" (Josh) – 7:51
6. "Find the Sun" (Findlay/Josh) – 5:35
7. "Ghost" (Josh) – 5:27
8. "Broken" (Findlay/Josh) – 5:11
9. "Silver Glass" (Johnson) – 7:10
10. "Further from Home" (Josh) – 6:26
11. "Dreaming" (Josh) – 8:37

== Limited Edition Double CD Version ==
=== CD 1 ===
1. "Fading Colours" (Josh) – 8:25
2. "Half a World" (Findlay) – 4:51
3. "Pocket Watch" (Josh) – 4:21
4. "Blue Light" (Johnson) – 4:58
5. "Walk with a Storm" (Josh) – 7:51
6. "Find the Sun" (Findlay/Josh) – 5:33
7. "Ghost" (Josh) – 5:28
8. "Broken" (Findlay/Josh) – 5:12
9. "Silver Glass" (Johnson) – 7:13
10. "Dreaming" (Josh) – 8:37

=== CD 2 ===
11. "Science and Machinery" (Johnson) – 6:00
12. "Open Road" (Josh) – 4:23
13. "Gaze" (Johnson) – 4:49
14. "Yellow Time" (Findlay) – 5:12
15. "Broken Soldier" (Josh) – 6:12
16. "Further from Home" (Josh) – 6:28
17. "Bright Green" (Josh) – 4:01
18. "Softer Than Brown" (Josh) – 5:02

== Personnel ==
- Bryan Josh - Lead Vocals; Lead/Rhythm/Acoustic Guitars; Bass Guitars; Piano (tracks 3, 6–8, 10, 16); Keyboards (1–3, 5–8, 10, 12, 15–18); Drum Programming
- Heather Findlay - Lead Vocals; 12 String Acoustic Guitars (14); Percussion; Backing Vocals (1–3, 5–6, 9–12, 16–18)
- Chris Johnson - Lead Vocals (9, 11); Piano (9, 13); Keyboards (4–6, 10–11, 13–14); Electric Guitars (4); Acoustic Guitars (4, 13); Glockenspiel (9); Backing Vocals (3–4, 6–7, 9–11, 15, 17); Drum Programming
- Angela Gordon - Flute (4, 14); Clarinet (4); Recorders (5); Piano (14); Backing Vocals (2, 5, 10, 14)
- Liam Davison - Slide Guitars
- Andy Smith - Bass Guitars
- Andrew Jennings - Drums
- Olivia Sparnenn - Backing Vocals (2, 5, 10)

Additional personnel

- Anne-Marie Helder - Backing Vocals (2, 4–5, 10, 16)
- Troy Donockley - Uilleann pipes (5, 10); Low whistle (16)
- Peter Knight - Violin (5–6, 13, 16); Backing Vocals (10)
- David Moore - Hammond Organ (2, 5, 12)
- Roger Newport - Backing Vocals (10)
- Mark Gordon - Backing Vocals (10)

(The above is from the limited edition's sleeve notes which means that 'track 10' refers to 'Dreaming' rather than 'Further From Home')
