= The Next Chapter =

The Next Chapter may refer to:

- Peter Andre: The Next Chapter, a British reality TV show
- The Next Chapter (album), a 2003 live album/DVD by Mostly Autumn
- The Next Chapter (radio program), a Canadian radio program
- The NeverEnding Story II: The Next Chapter, a 1990 German-American film
- The Next Chapter, a 2014 album by Gita Gutawa
- The Next Chapter, a 2020 EP by Don Amero
