= Give 'Em Hell =

Give 'Em Hell may refer to:

- Give 'Em Hell (Sebastian Bach album), 2014
- Give 'Em Hell (Witchfynde album) or the title song, 1980
