= Stagefright (album) =

Studio album by Witchfynde
- Released: October 1980
- Recorded: Fairview Studios, Hull, England
- Genre: Heavy metal
- Length: 39:03
- Label: Rondelet
- Producer: Roy Neave and Witchfynde

Witchfynde chronology
Give 'Em Hell (1980)	Stagefright (1980)	Cloak and Dagger (1983)

Professional ratings
Review scores
Source	Rating
AllMusic	2.5/5 stars
Collector's Guide to Heavy Metal	8/10

Stagefright is the second album released by the British heavy metal band Witchfynde. The album was released in October 1980 by Rondelet Records and re-released in 2005 by Lemon Recordings.

== Track listing ==
All songs by Witchfynde, except tracks 1, 3, 5 by Bridges/Montalo/Scoresby and track 9 by Bridges/Montalo/Surgey

Side one
No.	Title	Length
1.	"Stagefright"	4:40
2.	"Doing the Right Thing"	4:59
3.	"Would Not Be Seen Dead in Heaven"	4:43
4.	"Wake Up Screaming"	4:28

Side two
No.	Title	Length
5.	"Big Deal"	3:47
6.	"Moon Magic"	3:40
7.	"In the Stars"	3:38
8.	"Trick or Treat"	4:36
9.	"Madeleine"	4:32

== Personnel ==
- Steve Bridges - lead vocals
- Montalo - lead guitar
- Pete Surgey - bass guitar
- Gra Scoresby - drums, percussion
