= Through These Eyes =

Studio album by Bryan Josh
- Released: 2008
- Recorded: 2008
- Genre: Progressive rock
- Label: Mostly Autumn Records
- Producer: Bryan Josh

Through These Eyes is the debut solo album by Bryan Josh of Mostly Autumn. He plays all the instruments on the album except the drums and flute parts. Gavin Griffiths of Karnataka, Panic Room and Mostly Autumn played most of the drums on the album with Henry Borne, Mostly Autumn drummer during the 2008 shows, playing drums on two of the tracks. The two tracks Borne played on were songs left over from Mostly Autumn's Glass Shadows sessions and they can be heard in instrumental form on the bonus DVD that came with the special edition of Glass Shadows. The album also features Mostly Autumn bandmate Olivia Sparnenn on a few tracks singing lead, harmony and backing vocals.

== Track listing ==
1. Merry She Goes
2. Land of the Gods
3. The Appian Way
4. We Graze
5. Black Stone
6. Slow Down
7. Through These Eyes
8. Into Your Arms
9. Old Friends
10. Not a Dream
11. Only in the Loss
12. Going Home
13. Carry Me
14. The Appian Way [Radio Edit]

(All songs written by Bryan Josh)

Produced and engineered by John Spence at Fairview Studio.

== Credits ==
- Bryan Josh – lead/backing vocals, lead/rhythm/acoustic guitars, bass guitars, keyboards, tambourine
- Olivia Sparnenn – lead/backing vocals
- Gavin Griffiths – drums

With:

- Henry Bourne – Drums (tracks 5 and 6)
- Sarah Dean – Flute (9)
