= Sight of Day =

Studio album by Mostly Autumn
- Released: 10 February 2017 (pre-order); 7 April 2017
- Recorded: 2016–2017
- Studio: Fairview Studios, Hull
- Genre: Progressive rock
- Length: 73:33 (regular edition); 108:47 (limited edition)
- Label: Mostly Autumn Records
- Producer: Bryan Josh

Mostly Autumn chronology
Dressed in Voices (2014)	Sight of Day (2017)	White Rainbow (2018)

Sight of Day is the twelfth album by English progressive rock band Mostly Autumn. As with many of the band's previous albums, the recording was funded through a pre-order campaign. Those who pre-ordered the album received a double-disc edition of the album (limited to 2000 copies), which was released on 10 February 2017. Mostly Autumn's fanbase helped to fund the album. Chris Johnson, Autumn's former member, re-joined the band for Sight of Day after a seven-year absence.

A single-disc edition of the album was made available for general release on 7 April.

== Composition ==
Slight of Day has a defining influence of Pink Floyd, particularly noticeable on "Native Spirit" and on the eponymous track. The line "the greatest show on earth" from the title track is taken from the final track on Nightwish's album Endless Forms Most Beautiful.

In 2017 interview Josh said Sight Of Day was "definitely a reaction to the previous album, which was quite harrowing to record. [..] It was like a ray of sunshine, a weight off our shoulders."

== Critical reception ==
Rachel Mann, writing for Louder Sound, characterizes Sight Of Day as a "confident combination of old and new" material. Comparing the album to the band's previous, darker discography, Mann considers it uplifting, highlighting "Changing Lives" as an example, where Johnson has the "lightness of touch and jazz chord weirdness of Halo Blind at their most accessible". She also praises the instrumental chemistry between Josh and Sparnenn, calling Josh's guitar work "crackl[ing] like gunpowder", and admiring Sparnenn's vocal delivery as "clean and precise". On the mixed side, Mann didn't like Josh's rasping lead vocals, specifically on "Once Round The Sun" and "Forever And Beyond", the latter of which "takes the wistful farewell dangerously close to mawkishness".

Mann concluded by calling the album a "reminder" that Mostly Autumn is "the most consistent and passionate prog these isles have produced"; impressed by their ability to take "many of the familiar elements of classic prog – Gilmour-flavoured wig-outs, Tullish whimsy and mythic themes – and transmut[e] them into something fit for our uncertain 21st century".

== Track listing ==
Sight of Day
No.	Title	Writer(s)	Length
1.	"Sight of Day"	Bryan Josh	14:33
2.	"Once Around the Sun"	Josh	5:08
3.	"The Man Without a Name"	Olivia Sparnenn-Josh	3:50
4.	"Hammerdown"	Josh	6:05
5.	"Changing Lives"	Chris Johnson	6:17
6.	"Only the Brave"	Josh, Sparnenn-Josh	5:35
7.	"Native Spirit"	Josh	10:27
8.	"Tomorrow Dies"	Iain Jennings, Josh	7:20
9.	"Raindown"	Josh	8:01
10.	"Forever and Beyond"	Josh	6:17
Total length:			73:33

Limited edition
No.	Title	Writer(s)	Length
1.	"No Sense"	Josh	5:22
2.	"Back in Time"	Josh, Sparnenn-Josh	4:45
3.	"Heart, Body and Soul"	Sparnenn-Josh	4:58
4.	"Moments"	Jennings, Josh, Sparnenn-Josh	5:37
5.	"Pushing Down the Floor"	Johnson	4:20
6.	"July" (instrumental)	Josh	6:20
7.	"In Time"	Johnson	3:52
Total length:			35:14

== Personnel ==
Mostly Autumn

- Bryan Josh – vocals, guitar, keyboards
- Olivia Sparnenn-Josh – vocals, keyboards, tambourine
- Iain Jennings – keyboards, organ
- Andy Smith – bass
- Alex Cromarty – drums, percussion
- Chris Johnson – vocals, guitar, keyboards, tambourine
- Angela Gordon – flute, whistle, recorder, backing vocals

Additional personnel

- Troy Donockley – uilleann pipes, whistle (tracks 6 & 9)
- Anna Phoebe – violins (tracks 6 & 9)

Production

- Bryan Josh – production, mixing
- John Spence – engineering, mastering, mixing
- Chris Johnson – production, mixing (on "Changing Lives", "Pushing Down the Floor" and "In Time")
