= Pink Floyd Revisited =

Live album by Mostly Autumn
- Released: 2005
- Recorded: 2004
- Genre: Rock
- Label: Classic Rock Records
- Producer: Bob Carruthers

Mostly Autumn chronology
| The V Shows (2004) | Pink Floyd Revisited (2005) | Storms Over Still Water (2005) |

Pink Floyd Revisited is a live DVD recorded by rock band Mostly Autumn in 2004 and released in 2005. This was a recording of a one-off concert at the Civic Hall in Stratford-Upon-Avon where they played a whole set of Pink Floyd covers. It was only available for a limited period of time and has become quite sought after by Mostly Autumn fans. The V Shows DVD was also included in the same box making it a double DVD set.

== Track listing ==
1. "Pigs on the Wing - Part 1" (Waters)
2. "Echoes" (Gilmour/Waters/Wright/Mason)
3. "Fat Old Sun" (Gilmour)
4. "Another Brick in the Wall - Part 2" (Waters)
5. "Sheep" (Waters)
6. "Julia Dream" (Waters)
7. "Hey You" (Waters)
8. "Comfortably Numb" (Gilmour/Waters)
9. "Run Like Hell" (Gilmour/Waters)
10. "Pigs on the Wing - Part 2" (Waters)

== Personnel ==
- Bryan Josh - Lead/Backing Vocals; Lead/Rhythm/Acoustic Guitars
- Heather Findlay - Lead/Backing Vocals; Acoustic Guitars; Tambourine
- Iain Jennings - Keyboards
- Angela Gordon - Keyboards; Recorders; Backing Vocals
- Liam Davison - Lead/Backing Vocals; Lead/Rhythm/Acoustic Guitars; Slide Guitars
- Andy Smith - Bass Guitars
- Andrew Jennings - Drums
