= Live in the USA =

Live album by Mostly Autumn
- Released: 29 July 2003
- Recorded: October 2002
- Genre: Progressive rock
- Label: Classic Rock Records
- Producer: Bryan Josh

Mostly Autumn chronology
| Catch the Spirit – The Complete Anthology (2002) | Live in the USA (2003) | Passengers (2003) |

Live in the USA is a live album recorded October 2002 and released in 2003 by rock band Mostly Autumn.

== Track listing ==
1. "Nowhere to Hide" (Findlay, Josh) – 5:14
2. "The Spirit of Autumn Past" (Findlay, Jennings, Josh) – 6:54
3. "Evergreen" (Findlay, Josh) – 8:42
4. "The Last Climb" (Josh) – 9:15
5. "Winter Mountain" (Josh, Josh) – 6:38
6. "Shrinking Violet" (Findlay, Josh) – 8:18
7. "Dark Before the Dawn" (Faulds, Jennings, Josh) – 4:33
8. "Noise from My Head" (Findlay, Jennings, Josh) – 3:15
9. "Never the Rainbow" (Findlay, Jennings) – 4:50
10. "Please" (Findlay, Jennings, Josh) – 5:58
11. "Mother Nature" (Josh) – 15:03

== Personnel ==
- Bryan Josh – lead and backing vocals, lead and rhythm guitar
- Heather Findlay – lead and backing vocals, acoustic guitar, tambourine, bodhrán
- Iain Jennings – keyboards, backing vocals
- Angela Gordon – flute, recorders, backing vocals
- Liam Davison – rhythm and acoustic guitar, slide guitar, backing vocals
- Andy Smith – bass guitars
- Jonathan Blackmore – drums
