= 50 to a Pound =

Single by the Paddingtons

from the album First Comes First
- Released: 11 July 2005
- Recorded: Fairview Studios
- Genre: Rock

The Paddingtons singles chronology
"Panic Attack" (2005)	"50 to a Pound" (2005)	"Sorry" (2005)

"50 to a Pound" is the second single to be taken from the debut album First Comes First by Kingston upon Hull band the Paddingtons, released on 11 July 2005. It is their third single in total, "21" being their debut which was later re-recorded for the album.

Released over three formats and charting at number 32 in the UK Singles Chart, it featured three previously unreleased songs.

- CD
1. "50 to a £"
2. "No Time"
- 7" 1

A1. "50 to a £"
B1. "Kiss 'N' Let Go"

- 7" 2

A1. "50 to a £"
B1. "Against You Me" (written by Rory Mansfield)

== Other information ==
- The video for this single features 50+ friends/fans from Hull watching the band perform in a London pub until a fight breaks out. Lead singer Tom Atkin is thrown through a glass door by an angry gig goer after he kisses his girlfriend.
- Pete Doherty performed this song live on stage at Hedi Slimane's Birthday Party at Triptyque in Paris and got the timing of the song wrong, due to him only knowing the demo version of the song.
- An alternative (acoustic) version of the song is available through iTunes.
