= Shrinking Violet =

Shrinking Violet may refer to:

== Music ==
- "Shrinking Violet", a song on Mostly Autumn's album The Last Bright Light
- "Shrinking Violet", a song by the band Bishop Allen
- Shrinking Violet, an album by the band L.A. Guns

== Other uses ==
- Shrinking violet, an English idiom meaning a "shy person"
- Salu Digby, a character from DC Comics also known as Shrinking Violet
- Shrinkin' Violette, one of the children in The Funny Company
- Shrinking Violet, a book written by Danielle Joseph, foundation for Radio Rebel
- Shrinking Violet, a talking doll similar to Chatty Cathy manufactured in the mid-20th century in the US

== See also ==
- Violet (disambiguation)
