= Catch the Spirit – The Complete Anthology =

Catch the Spirit

Compilation album by Mostly Autumn
- Released: 2002
- Recorded: 2002
- Genre: Rock
- Label: Classic Rock Records
- Producer: Bryan Josh/Bob Carruthers

Mostly Autumn chronology
Music Inspired by The Lord of the Rings (2001)	Catch the Spirit (2002)	Live in the USA (2003)

Professional ratings
Review scores
Source	Rating
AllMusic	3/5 stars

Catch the Spirit is a compilation album released by rock band Mostly Autumn in 2002. This replaced the previous anthology Heroes Never Die and provides an introduction to the band using re-recorded material from their first four studio albums.

== Track listing ==
=== Disc one ===
1. "Nowhere to Hide" (Close my Eyes) (Findlay/Josh) – 5:03
2. "We Come and We Go" (Josh) – 4:41
3. "Please" (Findlay/Josh/Jennings) – 5:06
4. "The Spirit of Autumn Past - Part 2" (Findlay/Josh/Jennings) – 4:34
5. "Evergreen" (Findlay/Josh) – 7:57
6. "The Riders of Rohan" (Josh/Jennings) – 3:33
7. "This Great Blue Pearl" (Josh) – 3:58
8. "Noise From My Head" (Findlay/Josh/Jennings) – 3:05
9. "Half the Mountain" (Josh) – 5:17
10. "Shrinking Violet" (Findlay/Josh) – 8:47
11. "Goodbye Alone" (Josh) – 6:53
12. "Heroes Never Die" (Josh/Rayson) – 11:14

=== Disc two ===
1. "Overture - The Forge of Sauron" (Josh/Jennings) – 3:52
2. "The Dark Before the Dawn" (Josh/Jennings/Faulds) – 4:28
3. "Prints in the Stone" (Josh/Davison) – 3:50
4. "The Return of the King" (Josh) – 4:26
5. "The Night Sky" (Josh) – 9:34
6. "Winter Mountain" (B Josh/R Josh) – 6:22
7. "The Last Climb" (Josh) – 9:12
8. "Never the Rainbow" (Findlay/Jennings) – 4:33
9. "Porcupine Rain" (Findlay/Josh/Jennings) – 5:00
10. "The Gap Is Too Wide" (Jennings) – 10:37
11. "Mother Nature" (Josh) – 13:17

== Personnel ==
- Bryan Josh - Lead/Backing Vocals; Lead/Rhythm/Acoustic/12 String Guitars; Tambourine
- Heather Findlay - Lead/Backing Vocals; Tambourine
- Iain Jennings - Keyboards; Hammond Organ; Piano; Backing Vocals
- Angela Gordon - Flute; Recorders; Backing Vocals
- Liam Davison - Rhythm/Acoustic/12 String Guitars; Slide Guitars; Backing Vocals
- Andy Smith - Bass Guitars
- Jonathon Blackmore - Drums

Additional personnel

- Duncan Rayson - Keyboards; Piano; Programming
- Marcus Bousefield - Violin
- Geoffrey Richardson - Violin
- Troy Donockley - Uilleann pipes; Flute; High/Low Whistles
- Marc Atkinson - Backing Vocals
- Gina Dootson - Backing Vocals
- Janine Atkinson - Backing Vocals
- Marissa Claughn - Backing Vocals
- Nicola Garton - Backing Vocals
- Mathew Foster - Backing Vocals
