= Slow to Fade =

Studio album by Red Guitars
- Released: 1984
- Recorded: Fairview Studios, Hull (recording)/Musicworks, London (mixing)
- Genre: Indie rock
- Label: Self Drive
- Producer: Roy Neave & Red Guitars

Red Guitars chronology
| Slow to Fade (1984) | Tales of the Expected (1986) |

Professional ratings
Review scores
| Source | Rating |
|---|---|
| AllMusic | 3/5 stars |

Slow to Fade is the debut album by English rock band Red Guitars, released in 1984 on the singer Jerry Kidd's own Self Drive label. It reached number 3 on the UK Indie Chart, entering the chart in November 1984 and staying on the chart for six months. The album included the single "Marimba Jive", which topped the Indie Chart.

The album was noted for its polish and originality, and was described as "a bit of a classic" by Dave Henderson, writing in Sounds, but Kidd was to leave the band two months after it was released, releasing a statement saying "Technically we improved a lot during the last year but musically, from my point of view, we were standing still. New ideas and songs I had for the group no longer seemed to fit in".

The album was reissued on CD by Cherry Red in October 2002, with bonus tracks taken from the singles that had preceded it. All tracks were written by Kidd and Lewis, except for "Crocodile Tears" (Kidd) and "Heartbeat Go!", which was credited to the band.

== Track listing ==
1. "Remote Control"
2. "Dive"
3. "Astronomy"
4. "Cloak and Dagger"
5. "Crocodile Tears"
6. "Shaken not Stirred"
7. "Sting in the Tale"
8. "Marimba Jive"
9. "Slow to Fade..."

=== Bonus tracks on 2002 reissue ===
1. "Good Technology"
2. "Fact"
3. "Paris, France"
4. "Steeltown"
5. "Within Four Walls"
6. "Heartbeat Go!"

== Personnel ==
Red Guitars

- Jerry Kidd - vocals
- Lou Barlow - bass guitar
- Hallam Lewis - lead guitar
- John Rowley - rhythm guitar
- Matt Higgins - drums

with

- Grant Ardis - percussion
- Danny Woods - Hammond organ

Produced by Roy Neave and Red Guitars. Engineered by Roy Neave. Assistant Engineer: Neil Drake.
