= The Last Bright Light =

Studio album by Mostly Autumn
- Released: 2001
- Recorded: 2000/2001
- Genre: Rock
- Length: 71:41
- Label: Cyclops Records
- Producer: Bryan Josh

Mostly Autumn chronology
The Spirit of Autumn Past (1999)	The Last Bright Light (2001)	The Story So Far... (2001)

Professional ratings
Review scores
Source	Rating
DPRP	(8.5/10)

The Last Bright Light is the third studio album by rock band Mostly Autumn. It is the first album to feature drummer Jonathon Blackmore and bassist Andy Smith. It is the only Mostly Autumn album on which Angela Gordon receives a writing credit.

== Track listing ==
1. "...Just Moving On" (Josh) – 1:30
2. "We Come and We Go" (Josh) – 4:36
3. "Half the Mountain" (Josh) – 5:22
4. "The Eyes of the Forest" (Findlay/Josh) – 2:53
5. "The Dark Before the Dawn" (Josh/Jennings/Faulds) – 5:10
6. "Hollow" (Jennings) – 6:08
7. "Prints in the Stone" (Josh/Davison) – 3:27
8. "The Last Bright Light" (Josh) – 8:34
9. "Never the Rainbow" (Findlay/Jennings) – 3:48
10. "Shrinking Violet" (Findlay/Josh) – 8:34
11. "Helms Deep" (Josh) – 6:45
12. "Which Wood?" (Gordon) – 2:45
13. "Mother Nature" (Josh) – 12:09

== Personnel ==
- Bryan Josh – Lead/Backing Vocals; Lead/Rhythm/Acoustic/12 String Guitars; Gregorian Vocals (Track 8)
- Heather Findlay – Lead/Backing Vocals; Bodhran; Tambourine; Bells
- Iain Jennings – Keyboards; Synthesisers; Hammond Organ; Gregorian Vocals (8); Backing Vocals (2,5,6 and 9)
- Angela Gordon – Flute; Recorders; Renaissence Recorders; Backing Vocals (10)
- Liam Davison – Co-Lead Vocals (7); Acoustic/12 String Guitars; Slide Guitars (1,2 and 10)
- Andy Smith – Bass Guitars
- Jonathan Blackmore – Drums

Additional personnel

- Troy Donockley – Low Whistles (7 and 10)
- Albert Dannenmenn – Renaissence Recorders (8 and 11); Krumhorn (8 and 11); Rauschpfeife (8); Hummelden (11); Gaita (11); Gregorian Vocals (8)
- Marissa Claughan – Cello (4,6 and 10)
- Mark Atkinson – Gregorian Vocals (8); Backing Vocals (2,3,10 and 13)
- Janine Atkinson – Backing Vocals (2,3,10 and 13)
- Graham Hodge – Backing Vocals (2,3,10 and 13)
- Nicole Smith – Children's Vocals (10)
- Tabitha Buck – Children's Vocals (10)
- Produced and engineered by John Spence at Fairview Studio, Willerby, Hull.
