= Sorry (The Paddingtons song) =

Single by The Paddingtons

from the album First Comes First
- Released: 17 October 2005
- Genre: Rock, Punk
- Songwriters: Tom Atkin, Josh Hubbard, Lloyd Dobbs, Grant Dobbs, Martin Hines

The Paddingtons singles chronology
"50 to a Pound" (2005)	"Sorry" (2005)	"Stand Down" (2008)

"Sorry" is the fourth single from the debut album First Comes First by Kingston upon Hull band The Paddingtons, and their fourth single overall. Released on 17 October 2005, it spent two weeks in the UK Top 100, entering the charts at position 41.

== Details by format ==
Released over three formats, the single featured three previously unreleased songs, the details of which are listed below:

- CD
1. "Sorry"
2. "All Alone (Live Demo)"
- 7" 1

A1. "Sorry"
B1. "Mr Cracker"

- 7" 2

A1. "Sorry"
B1. "Claire My Dear"
