= The Underground (Stoke concert venue) =

Club/music venue in Hanley, England

Coordinates: 53.0226°N 2.1805°W

The Underground is a club/music venue in Hanley, Stoke-on-Trent, England. It was also part of the NME group, Club NME. It is well known for hosting several up and coming indie/rock/metal acts, and many local bands in the Staffordshire area.

== Artists ==
The Underground is host to many gigs, featuring bands from the local area and also many big name bands and DJs. Probably the most well-remembered gig at the Underground would be the first of many times Pete Doherty's band, Babyshambles performed. The gig ended in an impromptu car top sing-along led by Doherty and former Libertines bandmate Carl Barat, the incident referred to as The Babyshambles riot was covered heavily in the music press, and gave the club immediate cult status.

The Underground hosted a sold out acoustic set by Pete Doherty on 11 February 2009, then again on 30 May that year.

Bands that have played at the Stoke Underground include acts such as:

- Architects
- Arthur Lee & Love
- Babyshambles
- Big Narstie
- Bring Me the Horizon
- Crystal Castles
- Datarock
- Devil Sold His Soul
- Discharge
- Editors
- Exit Ten
- Fozzy
- Gallows (DJ set)
- Har Mar Superstar
- Hard-Fi
- Hadouken!
- The Holloways
- John Cale
- Klaxons
- Lethal Bizzle
- Lower Than Atlantis
- Milburn
- The Others
- The Paddingtons
- The Pipettes
- The Wombats
- Misfits
- Municipal Waste
- Mystery Jets
- Neck Deep
- Parkway Drive
- The Red Chord
- The Rumble Strips
- Sick of It All
- Stray from the Path
- U.K. Subs
- Walls of Jericho
- We Are Scientists
