= Different World (Uriah Heep album) =

Studio album by Uriah Heep
- Released: February 1991
- Recorded: 1990
- Studio: Chapel Studios, Thoresby, Lincolnshire, Fairview Studios, Wilerby, Hull, East Yorkshire
- Genre: Pop metal
- Length: 43:48
- Label: Legacy (UK and Japan); Roadrunner (Europe)
- Producer: Trevor Bolder

Uriah Heep chronology
Raging Silence (1989)	Different World (1991)	Sea of Light (1995)

Singles from Different World
- 1. "Different World" Released: 1991 (Germany only)

Professional ratings
Review scores
Source	Rating
AllMusic	1.5/5 stars
Collector's Guide to Heavy Metal	5/10
Rock Hard	7.0/10

Different World is the 18th studio album by British rock group Uriah Heep, released in 1991 in Europe and Japan, but not in North America. Different World was the first Uriah Heep studio album from which no single was released in the UK. It is the second studio album to feature the line-up that debuted on Raging Silence. Bass guitarist Trevor Bolder produced the album and has said that, although it was an experience, he found it tricky wearing the hats of both band member/musician and producer.

The UK vinyl and cassette releases had the lyrics on the inner sleeve: the CD had nothing at all printed inside the insert, although whether this was by accident or design is unclear. Subsequent CD reissues printed the lyrics and had bonus tracks.

The UK tour was Heep's first in support of a new studio product since 1985. They had played just the one UK show for Raging Silence.

The track "Which Way Will the Wind Blow" is not to be confused with "Which Way Did the Wind Blow", a track performed by Shaw and Lanzon in their previous band Grand Prix in 1980.

== Track listings ==
No.	Title	Writer(s)	Length
1.	"Blood on Stone"	Trevor Bolder	4:38
2.	"Which Way Will the Wind Blow"	Bolder	4:52
3.	"All God's Children"	Mick Box, Phil Lanzon	4:20
4.	"All for One"	Bolder	4:27
5.	"Different World"	Box, Lanzon	4:15
6.	"Step by Step"	Bolder	4:07
7.	"Seven Days"	Box, Lanzon	3:35
8.	"First Touch"	Lanzon	3:54
9.	"One on One"	Box, Lanzon	4:05
10.	"Cross That Line"	Box, Lanzon	5:35

CD edition bonus track
No.	Title	Writer(s)	Length
11.	"Stand Back"	Box, Lanzon	3:57
Total length:			47:45

1998 remastered edition bonus tracks
No.	Title	Writer(s)	Length
11.	"Stand Back"		3:59
12.	"Blood Red Roses" (remix)	Peter Goalby	3:52
13.	"Hold Your Head Up" (new edit)	Rod Argent, Chris White	4:22
14.	"Rockarama" (1987 live version)	Box, Bolder, Goalby, Lee Kerslake, John Sinclair	10:03
Total length:			66:04

2006 Deluxe Edition bonus tracks
No.	Title	Writer(s)	Length
11.	"Stand Back"		3:57
12.	"Powers of Addiction" (demo)	Bolder	4:12
13.	"Holy Roller" (extended version)	Box, Bolder, Kerslake, Lanzon, Bernie Shaw	5:03
14.	"Blood on Stone" (extended version)		7:03
15.	"Cross That Line" (extended version)		5:59
Total length:			70:02

== Personnel ==
Uriah Heep

- Mick Box – guitars, backing vocals
- Lee Kerslake – drums, backing vocals
- Trevor Bolder – bass guitar, backing vocals
- Phil Lanzon – keyboards, backing vocals
- Bernie Shaw – lead vocals

Additional musicians

- Brett Morgan – drums
- Danny Wood – accordion
- Benny Marshall – harmonica
- Steve Piggott – keyboard programming
- The "All God's Children" choir – Queen Elizabeth's Grammar School, Alford, Lincolnshire, England, conducted by Andrew Willoughby

Production

- Trevor Bolder – producer, mixing
- Roy Neave – engineer, mixing, computer programming
- Mat Kemp – engineer
