= The Next Chapter (album) =

Live album by Mostly Autumn
- Released: 5 August 2003
- Genre: Progressive rock
- Label: Classic Rock Productions
- Producer: Bob Carruthers

Mostly Autumn chronology
Live at the Canterbury Fayre (2003)	The Next Chapter (2003)	The V Shows (2004)

Professional ratings
Review scores
Source	Rating
Allmusic	3.5/5 stars
DPRP	6.5/10 stars

The Next Chapter is a live album/DVD consisting of live performances around the world, interview snippets and studio recordings such as "Forge of Sauron", by progressive rock band Mostly Autumn. The DVD was released on 5 August 2003.

== Track listing ==
1. "Forge of Sauron"
2. "Greenwood the Great"
3. "Gap Is Too Wide"
4. "Never the Rainbow"
5. "Noise from My Head"
6. "Please"
7. "Last Climb"
8. "Shindig"
9. "Spirits of Autumn Past"
10. "Prints in Stone"
11. "Mother Nature"
12. "Something in Between"
13. "Goodbye Alone"

== Personnel ==
- Bryan Josh – electric guitar, vocals, 6-string, 12-string acoustic, gregorian vocals on 8
- Heather Findlay – vocals, bodhrán, tambourine and bells
- Iain Jennings – keyboards, backing vocals, gregorian vocals on 8
- Liam Davison – electric slide guitar, vocals on 7 and 8, 6-string and 12-string acoustic
- Andy Smith – bass guitar
- Jonathan Blackmore – drums
- Angela Goldthorpe – flute, recorders, background vocals on 10
