= No Mundane Options =

Studio album by The Paddingtons
- Released: 3 November 2008
- Recorded: 2008
- Genre: Garage rock/punk
- Length: 33:42
- Label: Mama Bear
- Producer: Tony Doogan

The Paddingtons chronology
First Comes First (2005)	No Mundane Options (2008)

No Mundane Options is The Paddingtons' second album, released on 3 November 2008, and released through their own Mama Bear record label.

== Track listing ==
1. "Punk R.I.P."
2. "What's The Point in Anything New"
3. "Shame about Elle"
4. "No Mundane Options"
5. "Sticky Fingers"
6. "Molotov Cocktail"
7. "You & I"
8. "Plastic Men"
9. "Stand Down"
10. "Gangs"
11. "Heartsong"

== Critical reception ==
NME gave No Mundane Options a score of 6/10, saying that the album "finds [The Paddingtons] slumping into forgettable filler territory". James Skinner of Drowned in Sound gave the album a score of 4/10, finding that the Paddingtons "remain depressingly, predictably futile".
