= For All We Shared... =

Studio album by Mostly Autumn
- Released: 1998
- Recorded: 1997/1998
- Genre: Progressive rock
- Length: 65:50
- Label: Cyclops Records
- Producer: Bryan Josh

Mostly Autumn chronology
For All We Shared... (1998)	The Spirit of Autumn Past (1999)

Professional ratings
Review scores
Source	Rating
AllMusic	3/5 stars
DPRP	(8.5/10)

For All We Shared... is the debut album by English band Mostly Autumn. It is the only Mostly Autumn album to feature Allan Scott on drums and Kev Gibbons on whistles.

== Track listing ==
1. "Nowhere to Hide (Close my Eyes)" (Findlay/Josh) – 6:12
2. "Porcupine Rain" (Findlay/Josh/Jennings) – 4:40
3. "The Last Climb" (Josh) – 8:00
4. "Heroes Never Die" (Josh/Rayson) – 9:33
5. "Folklore" (trad.) – 5:49
6. "Boundless Ocean" (Josh/Jennings) – 5:42
7. "Shenanigans" (Faulds) – 3:50
8. "Steal Away" (Josh) – 4:56
9. "Out of the Inn" (Josh) – 6:43
10. "The Night Sky" (Josh) – 10:25

== Personnel ==
- Bryan Josh – 6- and 12-string electric and acoustic lead and rhythm guitars, lead and backing vocals, E-bow
- Heather Findlay – lead and backing vocals, acoustic guitar, tambourine
- Iain Jennings – keyboards, backing vocals
- Liam Davison – 6- and 12- string electric and acoustic rhythm guitars, backing vocals
- Bob Faulds – violins
- Stuart Carver – bass
- Kev Gibbons – high and low whistles
- Allan Scott – drums

Additional personnel

- Angela Goldthorpe – flute
- Chè – djembe
- Produced and engineered by John Spence at Fairview Studio, Willerby, Hull
