= First Comes First =

Studio album by The Paddingtons
- Released: 31 October 2005 tbc
- Recorded: 2005 in Hastings
- Genre: Indie rock
- Length: 33:42
- Label: Vertigo
- Producer: Owen Morris

The Paddingtons chronology
First Comes First (2005)	No Mundane Options (2008)

Professional ratings
Review scores
Source	Rating
NME	3.5/5 stars
Pitchfork	5.5/10
Rock Romantics	3/5 stars

First Comes First is The Paddingtons' debut album, released on 31 October 2005. The Paddingtons are English Indie Rock band from Kingston Upon Hull.

== Chart performance ==
The album reached No. 65 in the UK Albums Chart, in November 2005.

== Singles ==
- "21/Some Old Girl", released in October 2004 it reached No. 47 in the UK Singles Chart.
- "Panic Attack", the second single from their debut album, was their highest-charting hit reaching No 25 in the UK Singles Chart.
- "50 to a Pound", their third single reached No. 32 in the UK Singles Chart, their second UK Top 40 single.
- "Sorry", reached No. 41 in the chart.

== Track listing ==
1. "Some Old Girl"
2. "First Comes First"
3. "50 to a Pound"
4. "Worse For Wear"
5. "Loser"
6. "Panic Attack"
7. "Tommy's Disease"
8. "Stop Breathing"
9. "Alright in the Morning"
10. "21"
11. "Sleepdog"
12. "Sorry"
