= The Planet Wilson =

English rock band

The Planet Wilson were an indie rock band from Hull, that came from the breakup of the Red Guitars. They were signed to Virgin Records and released two albums in the late 1980s.

== Biography ==
Two of the former Red Guitars band members, Hallam Lewis and Lou Howard, formed the band after the Red Guitars split up in 1985. They were joined by Grant Ardis and latterly Jonah Lacey-Hatton for gigs (formerly of That Noble Porpoise) on drums. Lou Howard played bass and Hallam Lewis was on guitar and vocals. In 1988 they released the album In the Best of All Possible Worlds (on Virgin), on which, according to Trouser Press, "the three bandmembers occasionally seem to be playing different songs". In 1989 Not Drowning but Waving (on Records of Achievement) was released. Trouser Press described the second album as "uncommon pop music with claws".

Hallam later ran his own recording studio in Hull.

The Planet Wilson reunited for the Winterlude Special Reunion Party in 2006.

== Discography ==
=== Albums ===
- In the Best of All Possible Worlds (1988), Virgin
- Not Drowning But Waving (1989), Records of Achievement

=== Singles ===
- "White Lies" (1988), Virgin
- "Fly by Night" (1989), Records of Achievement
- "Taken for a Ride" (1989), Records of Achievement
