= Paul Thomas Sharpe =

British biologist (born 1955)

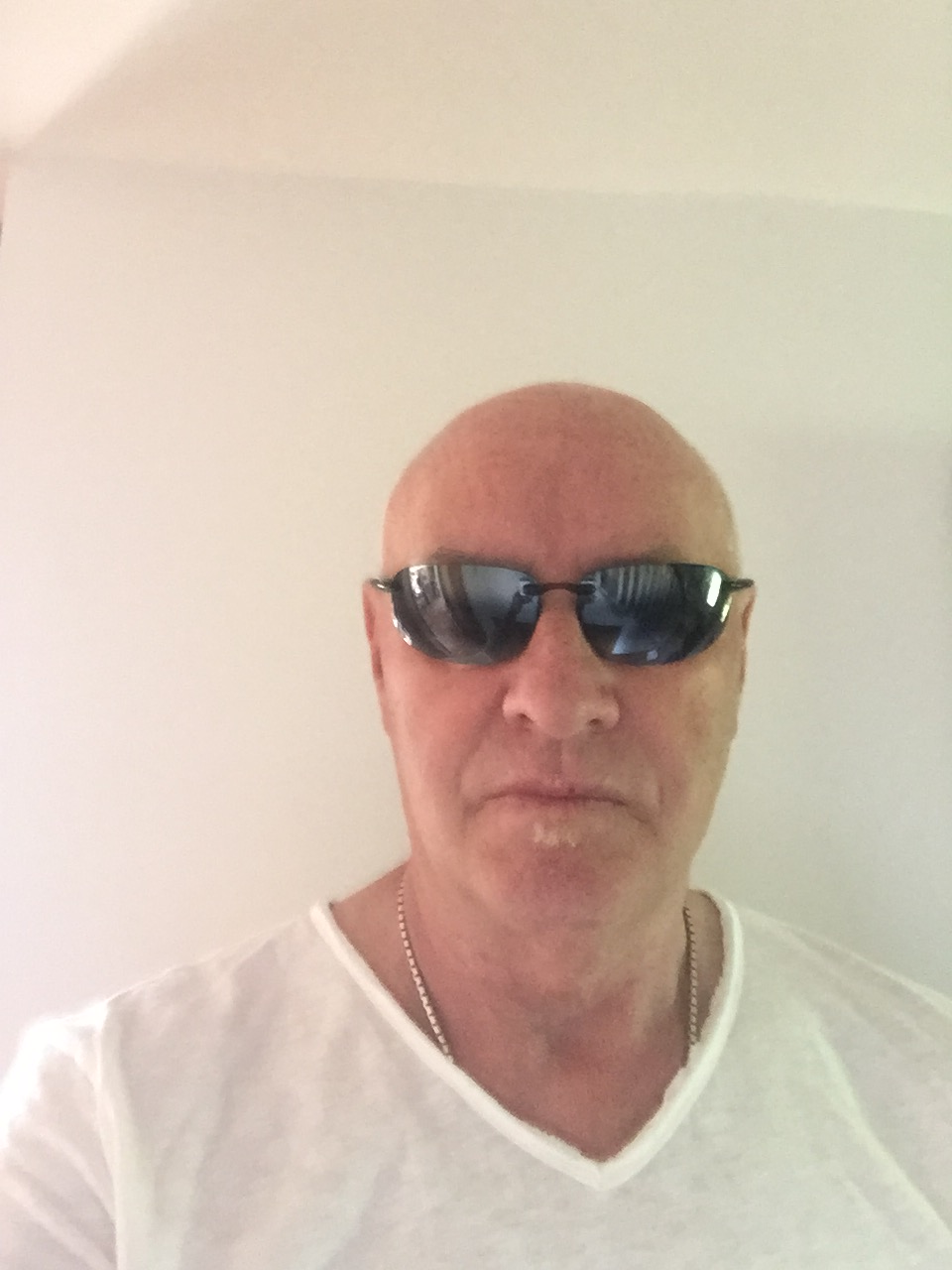
- Born: 11 December 1955 (age 70); Sheffield
- Known for: Cellular differentiation
- Spouse: Joy Elizabeth Sharpe (nee Mitchell)

Academic background
- Education: University of York; University of Sheffield
- Thesis: Differentiation of the cellular slime mould Dictyostelium discoideum (1981)
- Doctoral advisor: Donald J. Watt

Academic work
- Discipline: Biology
- Institutions: King's College London
- Website: www.kcl.ac.uk/people/paul-sharpe

Paul Thomas Sharpe (born 12 December 1955) is a British biologist, currently serving as the Dickinson Professor of Craniofacial Biology and the Director of the Centre for Craniofacial and Regenerative Biology, King's College London.

== Education ==
Sharpe was educated at De La Salle College, Sheffield (now All Saints Catholic High School, Sheffield) (1967–1974). He holds a BA in Biology from the University of York (1977) and a PhD from the University of Sheffield (1981).

== Research ==
Following his doctoral work at the University of Sheffield, Sharpe continued as a postdoctoral researcher there and also at the University of Wisconsin and the University of Cambridge prior to his first academic appointment at the University of Manchester (1997). Sharpe's research focuses on cell differentiation and began with his doctoral work on differentiation of the cellular slime mould Dictyostelium discoideum but he extended this work to mammalian tissues, principally bone. In this early work he applied the technique of thin layer countercurrent distribution. Subsequently, through the study of mouse embryo differentiation and the role of homeobox sequences in DNA, his work has mainly been applied to the field of craniofacial development. Most recently he has been leading research into the possibility of tooth regeneration and the development of new biological-based treatments for tooth repair. Sharpe is author of Methods of Cell Separation.

== Awards and recognition ==
Sharpe is an Honorary Fellow of the Royal College of Surgeons in Edinburgh (2010) and a recipient of the Gregor Mendel Memorial Medal (2003). He was awarded the Craniofacial Biology Research Award by the International Association for Dental Research (2004) and 2018 he received the William J Gies award for best publication is Biomaterials and Bioengineering (2018).

== Personal life ==
Sharpe (stage name Paul Shaft) is a musician and was a pioneer of the Sheffield punk music and new wave music scene. Originally he played bass guitar in the Sheffield band 2.3 and then formed the avant-garde band De Tian. He later played double bass and sang in the experimental jazz influenced band, Bass Tone Trap. Sharpe (Shaft) reformed 2.3 in 2018 and they have released two albums. Sharpe, a lifelong supporter of Sheffield United F.C. is married to Joy Elizabeth Sharpe (née Mitchell) and they have two children.

== Bibliography ==
Sharpe has over 300 publications listed on Web of Science which have been cited more than 14,500 times; his h-index is 66. His three most-cited articles are:

- Theslef, I; Sharpe, P (1997). "Signalling networks regulating dental development". Mechanisms of Development. 67 (2): 111–123. doi:10.1016/s0925-4773(97)00115-9. PMID 9392510. S2CID 14900117.
- Qui, MS; Bulfone, A; Ghattas-Fernandez, I; Meneses, JJ; Christensen, L; Sharpe, PT; Presley, R; Pedersen, RA; Rubenstein, JLR (1997). "Role of the Dlx homeobox genes in proximodistal patterning of the branchial arches: Mutations of Dlx-1, Dlx-2, and Dlx-1 and -2 alter morphogenesis of proximal skeletal and soft tissue structures derived from the first and second arches". Developmental Biology. 185 (2): 165–184. doi:10.1006/dbio.1997.8556. PMID 9187081.
- Tucker, A; Sharpe, P (2004). "The cutting-edge of mammalian development; how the embryo makes teeth". Nature Reviews Genetics. 5 (7): 499–508. doi:10.1038/nrg1380. PMID 15211352. S2CID 42067451.
