= Panic Attack (The Paddingtons song) =

Single by the Paddingtons

from the album First Comes First
- Released: 4 April 2005
- Genre: Pop punk, power pop
- Songwriter(s): Atkin

The Paddingtons singles chronology
"21" (2004)	"Panic Attack" (2005)	"50 to a Pound" (2005)

"Panic Attack" is a song by British rock band the Paddingtons, released on 4 April 2005. It is the first single to be taken from their début album First Comes First. Overall, it is the band's second single behind "21", which was released the previous year. "Panic Attack" peaked at number 25 on the UK Singles Chart.

UK webzine Drowned in Sound described the music as "power-pop-punk": "Rollicking drums propel ‘Panic Attack’ down blackened alley and into debauched club, while rasping, confrontational vocals dare the listener into Hari Kiri."

== Releases ==
The CD single included a cover of "Molly's Lips" by the Vaselines (1988). Drowned in Sound called the B-side "a cover of a cover", referring to the Nirvana cover of the same song from 1991. Eugene Kelly of the Vaselines praised the Paddington's version.

Two 7-inch vinyl single versions were released, one with a cover of "Yarmouth Town" by Great Big Sea on the B-side, and the other with the Paddington's original song "Keep Your Distance".

- CD – 9870603
1. "Panic Attack"
2. "Molly's Lips"
- 7-inch 1 – 9870602

A1. "Panic Attack"
B1. "Keep Your Distance"

- 7-inch 2 – 9870857

A1. "Panic Attack"
B1. "Yarmouth Town"
