= 21 (The Paddingtons song) =

Single by The Paddingtons
- Released: 11 October 2004
- Genre: Rock
- Label: Poptones
- Songwriter(s): The Paddingtons

The Paddingtons singles chronology
"21" (2004)	"Panic Attack" (2005)

"21" is the debut single by The Paddingtons, released on 11 October 2004, which was later re-recorded for the album First Comes First. This song convinced Alan McGee to sign them, and based on this song's popularity, got them an album deal.

Released over two formats, it never reached the UK Top 40 charting at 46. It featured two previously unreleased songs, the details of which are listed below:

- CD - MC5093SCD
1. "21"
2. "Some Old Girl"
3. "She's Got It"
- 7" - MC5093S

A1. "21"
B1. "Some Old Girl"

== Trivia ==
- Although "Some Old Girl" was unreleased, it was later re-recorded for the album.
- The single ran on a limited press and is now considered a much sought-after item on eBay.
