= Drill (British band) =

English rock band

- Origin: Newcastle upon Tyne, England
- Genres: Industrial metal Industrial rock Noise rock Alternative rock
- Years active: 1989–1994; 2005–2009
- Labels: Abstract Sounds; Retribution; Muza Muza; Saturate
- Past members: Kevin Wilkinson; Simon Malarkey; Antony Bircham; Simon Moore; Tony O'Brien; Chris Clark; Drew Gallon; Dave Craig; Andy Cooper; Rob Meek; Steve Chahley; Mark Lough; Dave Francis
- Website: drill official site

Drill are an English rock band from Newcastle upon Tyne. They were formed in early 1989 and released albums on the Abstract Sounds, Retribution Records and Muza Muza labels. After splitting in 1994 they reformed in 2005 releasing a new album in 2008. The Drill project was shelved late 2009.

Drill are notable for not using a drummer and for writing industrial rock music with time signature and tempo changes within each song and for writing songs that do not follow the typical verse, chorus, bridge etc. song structures.

== History ==
=== 1989 - 1994 ===
Kev Wilkinson and Tony O'Brien started Drill in 1989. Following the success of early demos and support slots with Bomb Disneyland (later to be known as Bomb Everything) and Ride the band recorded and released the album Skin Down in 1991 on Abstract Sounds. The album was well received by the music press, with Melody Maker describing it as "a musical white knuckle ride". The line-up at this time was:

Kev Wilkinson - vocals, Guitar, Programming
Tony O'Brien - Guitar
Simon Moore - Bass guitar
Davy Craig - Guitar, E-bow

To promote the album the band was booked to tour the UK with the band Pitchshifter, however on the eve of the tour, the tour bus was involved in a serious road crash during which the tour bus overturned injuring several members of the band. On 7 September 1991, Drill supported Nine Inch Nails on their second English gig at Newcastle Riverside.

Davy Craig left the band due to lack of touring, and was replaced by Andy Cooper before the band recorded and released the album White Finger in 1992 again on Abstract Sounds. For one track on the album The sound of rock, they were joined by guest drummer Gary Binns and Chris McCormack from the band Forgodsake. Chris McCormack later went on to form 3 Colours Red.

The White Finger album saw the band use sampling and move towards a more electronic sound. Again favorably received, it was described by The Guardian as sounding like "Freddy Krueger stalking around Tyneside in a thick fog".

The band released the album Paroxysm on Retribution Records in 1993 and the live album Snuffed on Muza Muza in 1994. The line-up of the band for these albums was:

Kev Wilkinson - vocals, Guitar, Programming
Tony O'Brien - Guitar
Simon Moore - Bass guitar
Rob Meek - Samples
Steve Chahley - Samples/FX

In 1994 the band ceased.

=== 2005 - 2009 ===
In 2005 the band reformed with original members:

Kev Wilkinson - vocals, Guitar, Programming
Tony O'Brien - Guitar
Si Malarkey - Bass guitar
Simon Moore - Bass guitar
Antony Bircham - Guitar

They were joined briefly on drums by Mark Lough from Hug Lorenzo, however due to conflicting commitments he left and the band went back to using sequenced drum patterns.

In 2007 Tony O'Brien left the band to be replaced briefly by Dave Francis.

In 2008 the band released the single Pitmanic and album The Last Taboo of America on Saturate with the line up:

Kev Wilkinson - vocals, Guitar, Programming
Simon Malarkey - Bass guitar
Antony Bircham - Guitar
Simon Moore - Bass guitar

Davy Craig returned briefly and played guitar on Pitmanic but left due to ill health.

Andy Cooper rejoined the band shortly before the Drill project was shelved in 2009.

== Discography ==
- Skin Down (1991 on Abstract Sounds)
- White Finger (1992 on Abstract Sounds)
- Paroxysm (1993 on Retribution Records)
- Snuffed (1994 on Muza Muza)
- Pitmanic (2008 on Saturate)
- The Last Taboo of America (2008 on Saturate)
