= Van der Neer =

van der Neer is a Duch surname. Notable people with the surname include:

- Aert van der Neer (1603–1677), Dutch painter
- Eglon van der Neer (1643–1703), Dutch painter, son of Aert

== See also ==
- Van der Meer
