= The Rats (British band) =

English rock band

- Origin: England
- Years active: 1963–1969
- Past members: Benny Marshall; Jim Simpson; Frank Ince; Brian Buttle; Geoff Appleby; Mick Ronson; Clive Taylor; John Cambridge; Keith "Ched" Cheesman; Mick "Woody" Woodmansey

The Rats were an English rock band, first established in 1963, from Hull, East Riding of Yorkshire, England.

In 1966, Mick Ronson joined The Rats, then including singer Benny Marshall, bassist Geoff Appleby and drummer Jim Simpson (who was subsequently replaced by Clive Taylor and then John Cambridge). The group played the local circuit and made a few unsuccessful trips to London and Paris. In 1967, The Rats recorded the one-off psychedelic track, "The Rise and Fall of Bernie Gripplestone" at Fairview Studios in Willerby, Hull, and can be heard on the 2008 release Front Room Masters – Fairview Studios 1966–1973. 1968 saw the band change their name briefly to Treacle and book another recording session at Fairview Studios in 1969, before reverting to their original name. Around this time, Ronson was recommended by Rick Kemp to play guitar on Michael Chapman's Fully Qualified Survivor album.

In 1968, Keith "Ched" Cheesman joined The Rats replacing Geoff Appleby on bass and the line-up of Ronson, Marshall, Cheesman and Cambridge entered Fairview studio to record "Guitar Boogie", "Stop and Get A Hold of Myself" and "Morning Dew". When John Cambridge left The Rats to join his former Hullaballoos bandmate Mick Wayne in Junior's Eyes, he was replaced by Mick "Woody" Woodmansey. In November 1969, the band recorded a final session at Fairview, taping "Telephone Blues" and "Early in Spring".

In May 1998, the independent record label, Angel Air released a CD compilation of their work, entitled The Rats' Rise and Fall of Bernie Gripplestone and the Rats From Hull.

== Band members ==
- Benny Marshall – vocals
- Jim Simpson – drums
- Frank Ince – guitar
- Brian Buttle – bass
- Geoff Appleby – bass
- Mick Ronson – guitar
- Clive Taylor – drums
- John Cambridge – drums
- Keith "Ched" Cheesman – bass
- Mick "Woody" Woodmansey – drums
