= Witchfynde =

English NWOBHM heavy metal band

- Origin: Chesterfield, Derbyshire, England
- Genre: Heavy metal
- Years active: 1976–1984, 1999–2022
- Labels: Rondelet; Expulsion; Mausoleum; British Steel; Neat; Cherry Red
- Members: Luther Beltz; Montalo; Gra Scoresby; Tracey Abbott; Ian Hamilton
- Past members: Al Short; Pete Surgey; Steve Bridges; Harry Harrison; Andro Coulton; Alan Edwards ("Edd Wolfe"); Dave Lindley; Ron Reynolds; Dave Hewitt; Neil Harvey; Richard Blower

Witchfynde are an English heavy metal band, forerunners of the new wave of British heavy metal in the late 1970s. Their music was closer to the mainstream than other metal bands of the era, embracing both simple pub rock and complex progressive rock elements.

== History ==
=== Early days ===
Witchfynde were formed in Derbyshire, England, in 1974, by bass guitarist Richard Blower and vocalist Neil Harvey. Richard Blower discovered Montalo (Trevor Taylor) in a band called Atiofel. When Richard left the band in 1975, they reformed Witchfynde with lead guitarist Montalo, bassist Andro Coulton and drummer Gra Scoresby, and soon recruiting vocalist Steve Bridges. The band released their first single, "Give 'Em Hell" in 1979 and released its first full-length album, also entitled Give 'Em Hell, on Rondelet Records in 1980. A major attribute to success may have originated by the frequent airplay on the Friday Rock Show, hosted by Tommy Vance on BBC Radio 1. The band gained some exposure by touring the United Kingdom with Def Leppard in the summer of 1980. The band's sound incorporated a mix of influences, such as doom, progressive and hard rock, with various aspects of the heavy metal sound as well as prominent use of satanic imagery.

=== Second album and change of musical direction ===
In 1980, the band released their second album Stagefright. Like their debut, it was recorded at Fairview Studios in Willerby, East Riding of Yorkshire, and is considered their most experimental work to date. During the period the album was released, bassist Andro Coulton was replaced by the more technically competent Pete Surgey.

=== Departure from Rondelet Records ===
Around the time of the band's second release, the relationship with their label Rondelet Records became increasingly strained, to the point where the label withdrew the band's funding. This made things very difficult for Witchfynde and eventually led to the departure of vocalist Steve Bridges. The band then recruited new singer Luther Beltz and began working on third album Cloak and Dagger; it was released on the small label Expulsion Records, but owing to bad production and the fact the label went bankrupt shortly after the album's release, it did not receive good promotion.

=== Mausoleum Records, fourth album and split ===
The band signed a deal in 1984 with Mausoleum Records to release their fourth album Lords of Sin. During the recording of the album, bassist Pete Surgey left the band and was replaced by Edd Wolfe, who had played in one of Luther Beltz's former bands; however, by the time the album was released he was replaced by Al Short, who played in the band Race Against Time. Although the band considered the album their strongest to date, it received very bad reviews from critics, with the final blow delivered when Mausoleum Records went bankrupt; as the result of the album's bad promotion, the band became totally disillusioned with the music business and split up.

=== Reunion, 1999–2020 ===
In October 1999, Montalo, Gra and Luther began to discuss the possibility of a reunion, owing to a resurgence of interest in the band after the release of the Best of Witchfynde CD in 1996, which sold well. Pete Surgey rejoined the band on bass. However, during rehearsals Luther Beltz announced that he no longer wanted to participate in the reunion; the band replaced him with vocalist Harry Harrison, a longtime fan of the band that was introduced by Pete Surgey. The band then began to work on their fifth album The Witching Hour, which they released on Edgy Records in 2001.

Their first three albums were re-released by Cherry Red and Lemon Recordings. A new Best Of album was released in 2007 by Lemon Recordings.

The band then began work on their sixth studio album called Play It to Death, which they recorded at Bandwagon Studios and released in July 2008. Towards the end of 2008, owing to Harry Harrison's ill-health and other commitments, Luther Beltz returned to front the band for the Play It to Death UK Tour.

July 2014 saw the addition of second guitarist Tracey Abbott from Overdrive.

Witchfynde played one of its first shows at the Metalcova Festival in Spain Barcelona on 28 November 2015, and continued to tour up until 2020. Standout shows included the Alpine Steel Festival in Austria Innsbruck 2016, the HOAF Festival in Germany 2019, the Sweden Rock Festival 2019, and the very first Metal Conquest in Rome in January 2020.

2020 saw the last performance of the remaining original band members, Montalo (Trevor Taylor) and Gra Scoresby. The concert was at Newcastle's famous rock bar, Trillions, and Luther Beltz retired soon after.

=== Dissolution ===
With the onset of the global pandemic in 2020, and ill health within the group, the remaining band members decided to retire from all live performances.

Witchfynde played their final show at Newcastle's Trillians in 2020. Guitarist Tracey Abbott continued performing a live Witchfynde set under the name Witchfynde-X, alongside bassist Ian Hamilton. Following a year-long tour across Europe in 2023, the band returned to the UK but ultimately dissolved due to an ongoing dispute between the original Witchfynde members and former bassist Andro Coulton.

In 2023, Andro Coulton, a short-term early bassist for Witchfynde, trademarked the band's name without the knowledge or consent of its founding members. This led to his booking under the Witchfynde name at the 2023 Keep It True Festival, much to the disappointment of both the promoter and fans, who had anticipated the presence of original members Gra, Montalo, and Luther. Shortly after, Andro was served with a cease and desist order, compelling him to relinquish the trademark and stop using the band's name.

== Musical style ==
Vlad Nichols of Ultimate Guitar wrote: "Despite the prevailing satanic imagery, Witchfynde was all about groovy hard rock, even with some progressive elements mixed in."

== Line-up ==
=== Last live Witchfynde line-up ===
- Luther Beltz – lead vocals (1980–1986, 1999, 2008–2022)
- Montalo (Trevor Taylor) – guitar (1973–1984, 1999–2022, retired from live performance)
- Gra Scoresby – Percussion (1973–1984, 1999–2022, retired from live performance)

=== Former ===
- Steve Bridges (vocals)
- Alan Edwards ("Edd Wolfe") (bass)
- Dave Lindley (drums)
- Ron Reynolds (guitars)
- Dave Hewitt (bass/vocals)
- Neil Harvey (vocals)
- Richard Blower (bass guitar)
- Tez Brown (drums)
- Harry Harrison (vocals)
- Andro Coulton (bass)
- Pete Surgey (bass guitar)
- Al Short (bass guitar/vocals)

== Discography ==
=== Studio albums ===
- Give 'Em Hell (Rondelet, 1980; reissued by Lemon, 2004)
- Stagefright (Rondelet, 1980; reissued by Lemon, 2005)
- Cloak and Dagger (Expulsion, 1983; reissued by Witchfynde Music, 2000)
- Lords of Sin (Mausoleum, 1984; first 10,000 copies came with Anthems live EP)
- The Witching Hour (Neat, 2001)
- Play It to Death (Neat, 2008)

=== Live albums ===
- Royal William Live Sacrifice (Neat, 2011)

=== Compilation albums ===
- The Best of Witchfynde (British Steel, 1996)

=== Singles ===
- "Give 'Em Hell" / "Gettin' Heavy" 7" (Rondelet, 1979)
- "In the Stars" / "Wake Up Screaming" 7" (Rondelet, 1980)
- "I'd Rather Go Wild" / "Cry Wolf" 7" (Expulsion, 1983)
- Anthems 12" (Mausoleum, 1984)
- "Conspiracy" / "Scarlet Lady" 7" (Mausoleum, 1984)

== See also ==
- List of new wave of British heavy metal bands
