= The Golden Virgins =

English pop and rock group

The Golden Virgins were an English four-piece pop and rock group from Sunderland, Tyne and Wear, England.

The members of the band were Lucas Renney (singer/guitarist), Neil Bassett (drums), Dave Younger (synth/keyboards) and Allan Burnup (bass). The band had shown great significance in Sunderland local music industry as they had played at Glastonbury, T in the Park, Leeds and Reading, dubbing them as one of Sunderland best known bands. The band split up in late 2006.

On 31st May 2025, 21 years to the day of the release of the Songs of Praise album, Lucas Renney played a one-off gig at Pop Recs in Sunderland during which he played the album in its entirety.

The band released five singles and an album. Its album, Songs of Praise, received critical accolades, having been released through XL Recordings in 2004. The Golden Virgins track "Renaissance Kid" was voted No. 42 in the 2003 Festive Fifty.
