= Karl Culley =

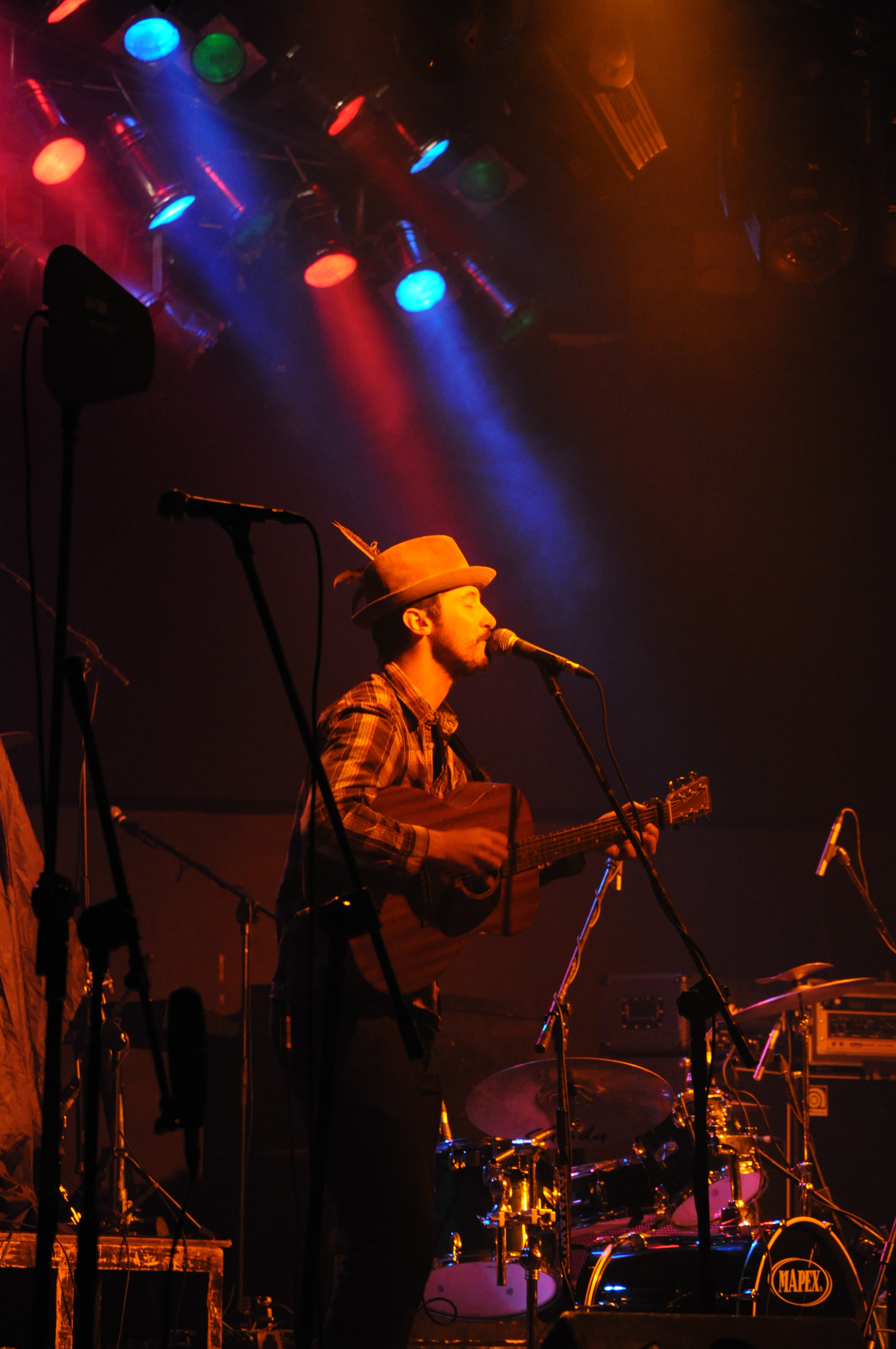
- Culley performing at Klub Studio in Kraków

Background information
- Born: 11 October 1979 (age 46)
- Origin: Harrogate, England
- Genres: Folk, Indie
- Occupation: Singer-songwriter
- Instruments: Guitar, vocals
- Years active: 1999 to present
- Labels: Sound of Jura, Triumphant Sound, Loose Wire Records
- Website: www.karlculley.com

Karl Culley (born 11 October 1979) is an English fingerstyle guitarist, songwriter, singer and poet. His percussive guitar style has drawn comparison to John Martyn, José González and Bert Jansch.

== Biography ==
Culley recorded his debut album with the British musician and producer Giles Perring, Bundle of Nerves, in an old school classroom on the Scottish island of Jura. Incorporating Perring's multi-instrumental abilities and the bass playing of Simon Edwards (Fairground Attraction, David Gray, Billy Bragg), the album was released to critical acclaim in 2010, MOJO magazine referring to it as an 'impressive début' and awarding it four stars.

His second offering, The Owl, produced by Daniel Webster, was put together in York and his native Harrogate for release in 2011. The Sunday Express awarded The Owl four stars and compared Culley to both Tim Buckley and José González.

Shortly after recording The Owl, Culley moved to Poland.

Working again with Giles Perring, Culley recorded tracks for his third album, Phosphor, in Kraków, Poland, and at Perring's studio on Jura once again. The album, which features the upright bass playing of Ash Johnson, also incorporated Perring's playing once more, alongside guest performances from Simon Edwards on psaltery, drummer Phillip Harper and the singer Melanie Pappenheim. It was released on 8 July 2013 and has been highly praised. Paul Sexton of BBC Radio 2 said 'Phosphor is an excellent album...' Soundblab awarded Phosphor 10 out of 10, calling it 'one of the finest alternative albums so far this year.' The Italian website Ondarock.com also lauded Phosphor, saying 'Phosphor is a valuable antidote to the poverty of inspiration and courage of many heroes of the indie singer-songwriter genre.'

Culley's fourth album, Stripling, was released on 27 April 2015. R2 (Rock'n'Reel) awarded Stripling four out of five stars, and compared Culley to Tim Buckley and John Martyn.

On 1 September 2018 Culley's fifth album, Last!, was released. Folk Radio UK commended Culley's first double album as 'an impressive and intimate collection of songs.'

In March, 2022, after a 2-year hiatus from making and performing music, Culley released the 5-track EP, Redshift.

In May, 2023, Culley released his 6th album, Stories Save Our Lives. The album was produced by Daniel Webster, who provided contributions on a variety of instruments, and features backing vocals from London-based artist Lettie. It was lauded by Hi-Fi News & Record Review, Folk Radio UK, and R2 (Rock'n'Reel), the latter calling the album 'a masterful collection from a stellar singer-songwriter.'

== Discography ==
- 2010 Bundle of Nerves
- 2011 The Owl
- 2013 Phosphor
- 2015 Stripling
- 2018 Last!
- 2022 Redshift
- 2023 Stories Save Our Lives
