= Red Guitars =

English indie rock band

- Origin: Kingston upon Hull, East Riding of Yorkshire, England
- Genres: Indie rock
- Years active: 1982–1986
- Labels: Self Drive Records, PIAS Recordings, Virgin Records

Red Guitars are an English indie rock band active from 1982 to 1986, reforming in 2022. Based in Hull, Red Guitars' first single "Good Technology" was a minor hit, selling 60,000 copies. Their singles "Marimba Jive" and "Be With Me" both reached number one on the UK Indie Chart.

== History ==
Red Guitars are vocalist and lead guitarist Hallam Lewis, drummer Matt Higgins, rhythm guitarist John Rowley and Lou Duffy-Howard on bass. Initially cutting their teeth playing benefit shows for a series of left-wing causes in the early ’80s Red Guitars quickly built a loyal following before releasing a series of singles via their own Self Drive Records label.

In 1982, the group recorded their first single "Good Technology". In keeping with the band's anti-corporate ideology, the Red Guitars released the single on their own record label, Self Drive Records. The video to "Good Technology" was broadcast on the cult 1980s Channel 4 music TV show The Tube, as part of the show's Hull music special.

Constant touring to support follow-up singles "Fact", "Steeltown" (The John Peel Session version of which also featured on the Four Your Ears Only EP – an aural collection which included Luddites, Red Lorry Yellow Lorry and Party Day) and "Marimba Jive", added to the daily pressures of running a record label resulted in internal pressures in the Red Guitars, culminating in the departure of Kidd in 1984, two months after the release of debut album Slow to Fade. The band continued on without Kidd for a further two years, bringing on Robert Holmes for vocals, but failed to achieve the previous critical or commercial success, although "Be With Me" also reached the top spot on the UK Indie Chart in May 1985.

Red Guitars disbanded in 1986 after their appearance at the Pukkelpop festival near Hasselt, Belgium. Two of the ex-band members, Hallam Lewis and Lou Howard, formed another group, the Planet Wilson. They were joined by Grant Ardis (drums and ancillaries). Howard was still on bass and Lewis on guitar and vocals. In 1988 they released the album In the Best of All Possible Worlds (on Virgin Records) and in 1989 they released the album Not Drowning but Waving (on Records of Achievement). Jerry Kidd released a solo single "Petals and Ashes (a song for Emma Goldman)" in 1985 (on Self Drive Records), after leaving Red Guitars; it had a mix of "Crocodile Tears" on the b-side. Lewis went on to run a recording studio in Hull. Holmes released a solo album in 1989, entitled Age of Swing, and has released a series of recordings since 2015 on YouTube under the title "Robert Holmes Channel Two"

The original line-up band reformed in 2022 for a UK Tour. In 2023 they released a red vinyl 40th anniversary remix of Good Technology and Fact in June 2023 (Cat No SCAR 16 T) on the band's own Self Drive record label, distributed by Cargo. The extended release of Good Technology was accompanied by a new video, recorded at the same scrap metal yard as the original single video made by Channel 4's The Tube. The video cut between the band then and now, and included an extended outro depicting the destruction of the planet.

The full original line-up undertook a 12 date UK 'Good Technology 2023' tour in September 2023. The band are recording a new album.

== Reunions ==
Amongst other tracks, the group performed "Paris France" at The New Adelphi Club in Hull on 14 February 1998. The Red Guitars played a one-show reunion at the Winterlude Festival in Hull, on 11 February 2006. The original line-up re-formed for a 7-date 'Slow to Fade' tour in April 2022.

== Personnel ==
- Matt Higgins (drums)
- Lou Duffy-Howard (a.k.a. Louise Howard / Louise Barlow, bass)
- Jeremy Kidd (vocals)
- Hallam Lewis (lead guitar)
- John Rowley (rhythm guitar)
- Robert Holmes (vocals/guitar – replaced Kidd on lead vocals in 1985)

== Discography ==
=== Albums ===
- Slow to Fade (Self Drive Records) 1984 UK Indie No. 3
- Tales of the Expected (Virgin Records) 1986

=== Retrospectives and collections ===
- Seven Types of Ambiguity (The BBC Sessions, re-release) (RPM Records) 1993
- Slow to Fade plus six bonus tracks (Cherry Red Records) 2002
- Good Technology (1982–1984) Self Drive Records 2009

=== Compilation EP ===
- "Steeltown" (John Peel Session Version), part of Four your Ears Only (PIAS Recordings) 1984

=== Singles ===
- "Good Technology" b/w "Heartbeat Go! Love Dub" (Self Drive Records) 1983 UK Indie No. 8
- "Fact" b/w "Dive" (Live) (Self Drive Records) 1983 UK Indie No. 7
- "Good Technology" b/w "Paris France" (Self Drive Records) 1984 UK Indie No. 4
- "Good Technology" b/w "Fact", "Paris France" (Self Drive Records 12-inch) 1984 UK Indie No. 4
- "Steeltown" b/w "Within 4 Walls" (Self Drive Records 7-inch & 12-inch) 1984 UK Indie No. 2
- "Marimba Jive" b/w "Heartbeat Go!" (Self Drive Records) 1984 UK Indie No. 1
- "Marimba Jive (Extended Survival Mix)" b/w "Heartbeat Go! (Extended 'Pinky-Work' Mix)" (Self Drive Records 12-inch) 1984 UK Indie No. 1
- "Be With Me" b/w "Things I Want" (One Way Records) 1985 UK Indie No. 1
- "Be With Me" (longer version) b/w "Things I Want" (One Way Records 12-inch) 1985 UK Indie No. 1
- "National Avenue (Sunday Afternoon)" b/w "King And Country" (Virgin Records) 1986
- "National Avenue (Sunday Afternoon)" b/w "King And Country", "Things I Want" (Virgin Records 12-inch) 1986
- "America And Me" b/w "Marianne" (Virgin Records) 1986
- "America and Me", "Marianne" b/w "America and Me (12-inch version)" (Virgin Records 12-inch) 1986
- "Blue Caravan" b/w "Suspicion And Fear" (Virgin Records) 1986
- "Blue Caravan" b/w "Blue Caravan (Acoustic)", "Suspicion And Fear" (Virgin Records 12-inch) 1986
- "Good Technology 2023 b/w Fact (remix) and Good Technology 2023 (extended remix) (red vinyl 12" Self Drive Records SCAR 16 T) 2023

== See also ==
- Bands and musicians from Yorkshire and North East England
- List of Peel sessions
