= The J.T.A. =

English Britrock band

The JTA
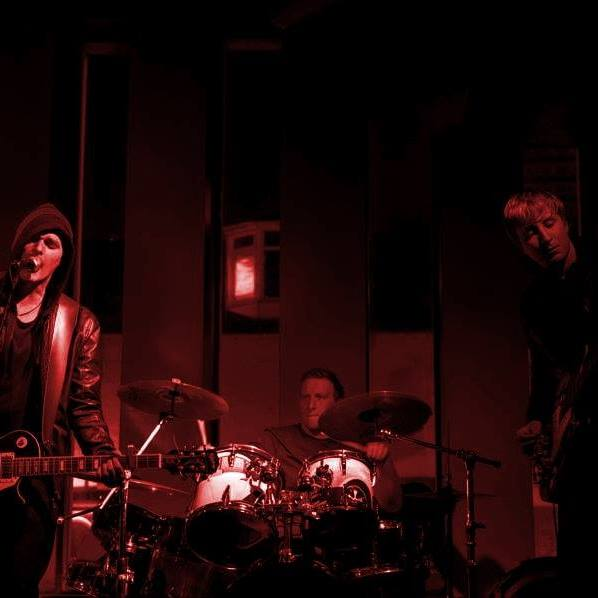
- The J.T.A. playing at Arizona in Sunderland 2014

Background information
- Origin: Newcastle upon Tyne/London, England, UK
- Genres: Britrock
- Years active: 2011–present

The JTA are an English two-piece Britrock band from Newcastle upon Tyne/London.

== Career ==
The JTA began 2019 by stating that they would release a new song every two weeks through their website. Their anti-Brexit track "Water" was subsequently played on BBC Newcastle. The band have performed at venues across the UK including O2 Academy Newcastle and gained a reputation for appearing on stage wearing Balaclavas.

The band are also known for their work with local charities, most frequently Teenage Cancer Trust.
