= The Paddingtons =

English indie rock band

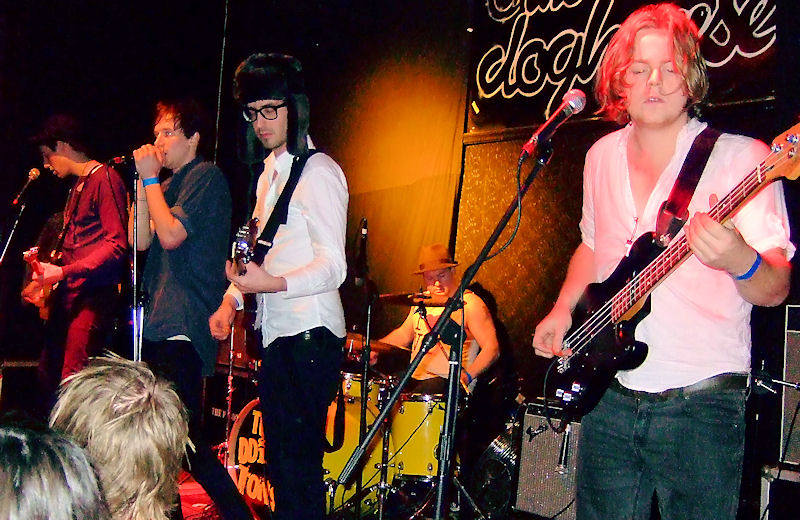
- The Paddingtons at the Dundee Doghouse

Background information
- Origin: Hull, England
- Genres: Indie rock, alternative rock
- Years active: 2002–2009; 2014; 2025
- Labels: Mercury, Mama-Bear, DMC
- Members: Tom Atkin; Stuee Bevan; Martin Hines; Lloyd Dobbs; Grant Dobbs
- Past members: Josh Hubbard
- Website: thepaddingtons.net

The Paddingtons are an English indie rock band from Hull who formed in 2002. Between April 2005 and 9 November 2006, they played over 150 live shows, including venues such as Trent Park Golf Club, The Square, Harlow; Jersey Live; Summercase; The Underground, Stoke-on-Trent; T in the Park and at the Reading and Leeds Festivals. Electronicore band Enter Shikari from Friendly Fires' hometown St. Albans named the song after them, "the Paddington Frisk".

== Career ==
Composed of Tom Atkin (vocalist), Stuee Bevan (guitarist) (originally Martin Hines), Josh Hubbard (guitarist); and brothers Lloyd (bassist) and Grant Dobbs (drummer), they were signed by Alan McGee to his Poptones record label.

They originally made their name touring in and around the Hull area, at such venues as the Welly Club, The New Adelphi Club, and the Railway pub in Cottingham and became part of the New Yorkshire movement of the mid-2000s. Favoured by Libertines frontman Pete Doherty, they toured with Babyshambles in 2005.

Their debut album, First Comes First, was produced by Owen Morris, producer of Oasis' Definitely Maybe. While their first LP achieved only modest commercial success, it raised the band's profile sufficiently to see singer Atkin listed on NME's Cool List 2005.

In November 2006, they headed out on a small scale national tour to road test new material. They appeared alongside The Cribs at the Birmingham Academy. The Paddingtons also appeared with Dirty Pretty Things at The Forum in May, and again at The Spice Festival at the Hackney Empire in July 2007. On a holiday in Taipei, Carl Barat of Dirty Pretty Things broke his collarbone, so they recruited the help of Hubbard to play guitar while Barat's injury healed.

In December 2007, they appeared alongside The Neat and The View at Hull City Hall, as part of the Love Music Hate Racism campaign. During the same month they also played a free gig on Christmas Eve to raise money to refurbish the toilets in The New Adelphi Club. Their live sets have included a cover version of The Clash's song, "Janie Jones" and The Vaselines' "Molly's Lips."

The band's second album, No Mundane Options, was released on 3 November 2008. The first single from the album, "Stand Down," was released on the Mama Bear Records label, on 4 August 2008. It also included the single "What's The Point In Anything New."

In December 2009, the band announced plans to release a new EP, The Lady Boy Tapes, which was released the following year. It saw the band team up with Adam Green from The Moldy Peaches for the single "Lady Boy" which was accompanied by a low budget video featuring various places of interest in Hull including Boothferry Park, Humber Bridge and The Deep whilst brothers Lloyd and Grant drink in The Paddington's favourite pub Queens Hotel.

After a five-year hiatus, The Paddingtons reunited to play Hull's flagship festival Humber Street Sesh Festival in 2014, and returned in 2018 to play a "wonderfully shambolic" set according to Jimi Arundell in Gigwise.

== Discography ==
=== Studio albums ===
- 2005 - First Comes First
- 2008 - No Mundane Options

=== Compilation albums ===
- 2004 - Bring Your Own Poison - The Rhythm Factory Sessions - (contributed an early version of the future album track - "Tommy's Disease").
- 2006 - Back To The Bus

=== Singles ===
- 2004 - "21" (UK No. 47)
- 2005 - "Panic Attack" (UK No. 25)
- 2005 - "50 to a Pound" (UK No. 32)
- 2005 - "Sorry" (UK No. 41)
- 2008 - "Stand Down"
- 2008 - "What's The Point in Anything New"

=== EPs ===
- 2010 - "The Lady Boy Tapes"

== See also ==
- Bands and musicians from Yorkshire and North East England
- List of British punk bands
- List of indie rock musicians
- List of Mercury Records artists
