= We Start Fires =

English punk-pop rock 'n' roll band

- Origin: Darlington, England
- Genres: New wave, pop punk
- Years active: 2002–2008
- Labels: Hot Noise Records (UK); 51 Records (Japan)
- Members: Becky Stefani; Melissa Marx; Ashley Wade; Nikki Vaughan

We Start Fires were a female-fronted punk-pop rock 'n' roll band formed in Darlington in 2002. They consist of Becky Stefani (vocals and guitar), Melissa Marx (synths and vocals), Nikki Vaughan (bass and vocals), and Becky's younger brother Ashley Wade (drums).

Their first limited-edition single, "Strut", received radio airplay from Zane Lowe, Rob Da Bank, Steve Lamacq, Marc Riley and John Kennedy. John Peel mentioned them in his book Margrave of the Marshes.

They performed at SXSW, for which they were filmed as the subjects of a documentary film later shown on the BBC's The Culture Show.

== Discography ==
=== Albums ===
- Caught Redhanded (Head Girl Records) – 2004
- We Start Fires (Hot Noise Records) – 1 October 2007

=== Singles/EP’s ===
- "How to Be a Lady" (EP, Head Girl Records) – 2002
- "Strut" (Marquis Cha Cha Records) – August 2005
- "Hot Metal" (Marquis Cha Cha Records) – January 2006
- "Magazine" (Hot Noise Records) – 28 May 2007
- "Play You" (Hot Noise Records) – 20 August 2007
- "Let's Get Our Hands Dirty" (Hot Noise Records) – 22 October 2007

=== Compilation contributions ===
- "Hot Metal" - What We All Want (Dance to the Radio Records) – 27 February 2006
