= Spacemaid =

English Britpop group

Spacemaid was an English Britpop group, founded in Hull, England in 1992. The band consisted of vocalist Lonny Evans, guitarist Alan Jones, guitarist Mat Tennant, bassist Andy Burgess and drummer Chris Black. "Baby Come On" was featured as a Mark Radcliffe 'record of the week' on BBC Radio 1.

Their only album, Supercool, released on 16 June 1997, featured a cover version of The Ramones' "Do You Remember Rock and Roll Radio?", with guest vocals by Joey Ramone.

== Discography ==
=== Albums ===
- Supercool - Big Star (STAR108) 1997

=== Singles ===
- "Belly Up" / "Blood Sister" - Popcor (POPCOR004) 1994
- "Teen Sensation" / "Bigger Than Life" - Popcor (POPCOR008) 1995
- "The Girl Who Sold the World" - Big Star (STAR101) 1996
- "Do You Remember Rock and Roll Radio?" - Big Star (STAR102) 1996
- "Baby Come On" - Big Star (STAR105) 1997 - UK No. 70
- "Supercool" - Big Star (STAR107) 1997
- "Love in the First" - 1997
