= Give 'Em Hell (Witchfynde album) =

Studio album by Witchfynde
- Released: 5 February 1980
- Recorded: Autumn 1979
- Studio: Fairview Studios, Hull, England
- Genre: Heavy metal
- Length: 35:52
- Label: Rondelet
- Producer: Witchfynde

Witchfynde chronology
Give 'Em Hell (1980)	Stagefright (1980)

Professional ratings
Review scores
Source	Rating
AllMusic	4/5 stars
Classic Rock	4/5 stars
Collector's Guide to Heavy Metal	8/10
Record Mirror	4/5 stars

Give 'Em Hell is the debut album by the British heavy metal band Witchfynde. The album was released in 1980 during the new wave of British heavy metal heyday and re-released in 2004 by Lemon Recordings. The 2004 re-release featured three bonus tracks ("The Devil's Gallop", "Tetelestai", and "Wake Up Screaming").

The album has been cited as a relevant example for the production of the NWOBHM scene and as an inspiration for the black metal subgenre.

== Track listing ==
All tracks are written by Witchfynde

Side one
No.	Title	Length
1.	"Ready to Roll"	4:15
2.	"The Divine Victim"	5:03
3.	"Leaving Nadir"	6:12
4.	"Gettin' Heavy"	3:52

Side two
No.	Title	Length
5.	"Give 'em Hell"	4:03
6.	"Unto the Ages of the Ages"	8:54
7.	"Pay Now Love Later"	3:33

=== 2004 CD reissue ===
No.	Title	Length
1.	"Ready to Roll"	4:15
2.	"The Divine Victim"	5:03
3.	"Leaving Nadir"	6:12
4.	"Gettin' Heavy"	3:52
5.	"Give 'em Hell"	4:03
6.	"Unto the Ages of the Ages"	8:54
7.	"Pay Now Love Later"	3:33
8.	"The Devil's Gallop"	0:31
9.	"Tetelestai"	8:44
10.	"Wake Up Screaming"	4:20

== Personnel ==
- Steve Bridges – vocals
- Montalo – guitar
- Andro Coulton – bass
- Gra Scoresby – drums
- Roy Neave – engineer
