= Misery Addict =

English hardcore punk band

- Origin: Middlesbrough, England
- Genres: Horror punk, hardcore punk, punk rock, heavy metal, powerviolence
- Years active: 2009–2012; 2015–present
- Label: 100 Years Records
- Members: Andrew Bishop
- Past members: Adam Kennedy; Andrew Ferris; Guille Chocrón; Matthew Marko; Matthew Budrewicz

Misery Addict are an English hardcore punk band originating from Middlesbrough, formed in 2009.

== History ==
Misery Addict formed in 2009 as a horror punk band. Early releases such as Misery Addict and The Deserter went largely unnoticed, with publication I Heart Noise noting "their contributions are decent but fairly generic-sounding". Following the release of the split EP Beasts/Misery Addict in 2010, Misery Addict focused on playing live, supporting acts such as AC4, Beasts, Castrovalva, The Computers, Eagulls The Hangmen, The Plight and Jason Welt, and playing charity gigs such as Rock for Heroes.

=== Hate Tape (2011) ===
The band released Hate Tape in 2011 in digital mediums and also via a limited cassette run. NARC Magazine called it "relentlessly energetic", with Punktastic saying "full of ferociousness, each track, the longest being just over a minute long, brings the expected thrashing drums, fast paced riffs and forceful screams," although noting "it never really escapes the predictable". The tracks Lies (You've Turned This House into a House Of), F-Bomb, and Target Practice received radio play on BBC Introducing the same year.

=== Hiatus and return (2012–present) ===
Guitarist Adam Kennedy announced his departure from the band in 2011. Despite auditioning potential replacements, the band couldn't find anyone who they felt fit the band and subsequently split. There were two releases following the split, I'm Afraid of Cilla Black in 2015 and a live album, Tattoo Jam, in 2017, both consisting of b-sides and live recordings taken prior to the split. Andrew Bishop confirmed in early 2017 that he had reformed Misery Addict as a studio only band in 2015 with new members to record a follow up album, -3, which was released in 2017.

== Discography ==
Studio albums

- Misery Addict (2010)
- The Deserter (2011)
- Hate Tape (2011)
- -3 (2017)

Live albums

- Tattoo Jam (2017)

EPs

- Everybody Hates... (2011)
- Skulls (2010)
- Free Sampler (2010)
- Welcome to Arrow Beach (2011)
- Don't Like My Art? (2011)
- The Devil is Dead... Long Live the Devil (2011)
- The Private Parts (2011)
- I'm Afraid of Cilla Black (2015)

Split releases

- Beasts/Misery Addict (2010)
