= Rondelet Records =

- Founded: 1980
- Founder: Alan Campion
- Status: Defunct
- Genre: Punk rock, heavy metal
- Country of origin: England
- Location: Mansfield, Nottinghamshire

Rondelet Records was a British independent record label started by Alan Campion, who owned a record shop in Mansfield, Nottinghamshire in the early 1980s. The label published many punk groups including:

- Special Duties
- The Threats
- Deadman's Shadow
- Riot Squad
- Anti-Pasti

The label also featured some bands from the new wave of British heavy metal, including Witchfynde, who toured with Def Leppard in their early days.

The label had some success with Special Duties, Anti-Pasti and Witchfynde, whose songs and albums reached the national charts. However, by the mid-1980s the label folded, though some of the bands are still touring today.
