= Mostly Autumn =

English rock band

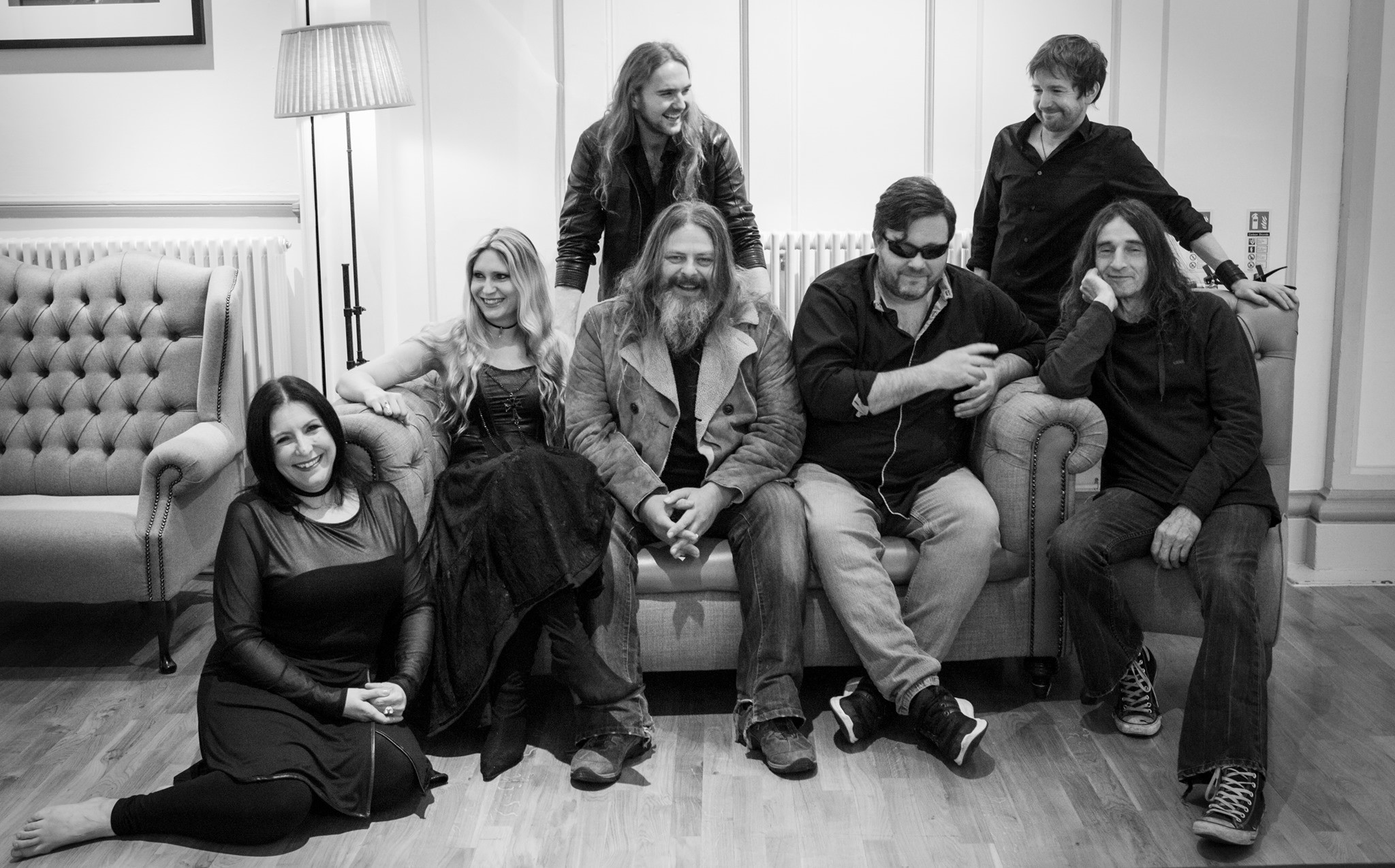
- Mostly Autumn in 2021. Left to right, Angela Gordon, Olivia Sparnenn-Josh, Henry Rogers (top), Bryan Josh, Iain Jennings, Chris Johnson and Andy Smith.

Background information
- Origin: York, North Yorkshire, England
- Genres: Progressive rock; Celtic; hard rock; folk rock
- Years active: 1995–present
- Labels: Cyclops; Classic Rock; Mostly Autumn; Dejavu Retro
- Members: Bryan Josh; Iain Jennings; Angela Gordon; Andy Smith; Olivia Sparnenn; Chris Johnson; Henry Rogers
- Past members: Liam Davison; Bob Faulds; Kev Gibbons; Heidi Widdop; Alun Hughes; Chris Walton; Stuart Carver; Allan Scott; Heather Findlay; Rob McNeil; Jonathan Blackmore; Andrew Jennings; Anne-Marie Helder; Henry Bourne; Robbie Baxter; Gavin Griffiths; Alex Cromarty
- Website: www.mostly-autumn.com

Mostly Autumn are an English rock band. The group formed in 1995 and have built their reputation through constant touring, never signing to a major label. They produce music heavily influenced by 1970s progressive rock. According to the BBC, Mostly Autumn "fuse the music of Genesis and Pink Floyd with Celtic themes, hard rock and strong, emotional melodies". They have also been compared with other progressive bands from the same era such as Renaissance, Jethro Tull and Camel, blended with traditional folk music. Later albums also include more contemporary influences.

== History ==
Mostly Autumn was formed in the mid-1990s. The original line-up included several members of One Stoned Snowman, a Pink Floyd/1970s tribute band. The band's founding line-up consisted of band leader Bryan Josh (vocals and guitars), Heidi Widdop (vocals), Iain Jennings (keyboards), Liam Davison (guitars), Alun Hughes (bass and occasional keyboards), Bob Faulds (violin), Kev Gibbons (whistles), and Chris Walton (drums). Mostly Autumn's first live shows were supported by One Stoned Snowman or vice versa; One Stoned Snowman's final concert was a farewell show in December 1995 and was indeed supported by Mostly Autumn. Mostly Autumn's original rhythm section of Alun Hughes and Chris Walton left the band during 1996 to concentrate on other musical projects and family commitments respectively. They were replaced by bassist Stuart Carver and drummer Allan Scott. Shortly after, Widdop was replaced on vocals by Heather Findlay.

This line-up recorded For All We Shared... in 1998. More line-up changes ensued. By 1999, when the band recorded its second album, The Spirit of Autumn Past, Gibbons and Scott had been replaced by Angela Goldthorpe and Rob McNeil respectively.

In 2000 (as a three piece – Josh, Findlay, and Goldthorpe) they achieved a support slot for Blackmore's Night on their Under a Violet Moon tour, bringing them to a wider audience. On the cover artwork for the following Blackmore's Night album Fires at Midnight (2001), Heather Findlay provided the illustration for the song "Hanging Tree".

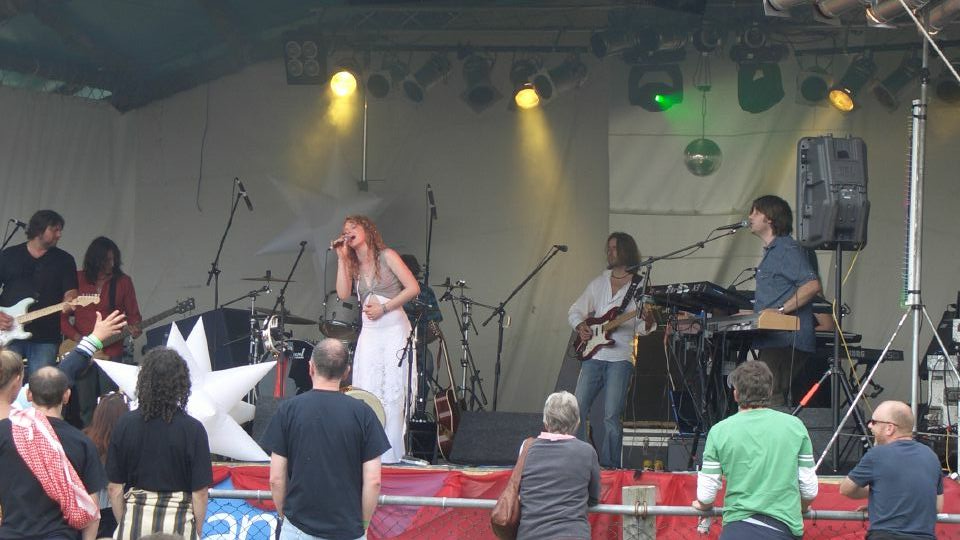
The band performing at the Wickerman Festival, Scotland, 2005. Left to right: Bryan Josh, Andy Smith, Heather Findlay, Andrew Jennings (on drums), Liam Davison, Iain Jennings and Angela Gordon (obscured).

On Mostly Autumn's third album, The Last Bright Light (2001), Rob McNeil, in turn, was replaced by Jonathan Blackmore. Andy Smith replaced Stuart Carver on the bass guitar. Shortly before the band's 'V Shows' tour in 2004, Iain's brother Andrew Jennings took over on drums and percussion. By this time, the band had been praised by Rick Wright of Pink Floyd. Olivia Sparnenn joined the band in 2005 to provide backing vocals. Ben Matthews of Thunder stood in on keyboards for Mostly Autumn's headline gig at the Baja Prog Festival in Mexico in March 2006. Chris Johnson was then recruited as a permanent replacement, with Angela (now under her married name Gordon) also taking a more prominent role on keyboards.

At the beginning of 2007, both guitarist Liam Davison and drummer Andrew Jennings left the band; Davison to concentrate on his solo album and Jennings to devote his time to his other projects. The guitar parts were shared out amongst the rest of the group. Ex-Karnataka drummer Gavin Griffiths stood in on drums for most of the 2007 live shows; Andrew Jennings temporarily rejoined the group at the end of 2007, until Henry Bourne took over in 2008. Gavin Griffiths returned for the first shows of 2009 in Manchester and London. After Chris Johnson and Angela Gordon left in 2007, Iain Jennings and Liam Davison returned to the group on keyboards and guitar respectively. Anne-Marie Helder (who had played support slots in the past and stood in for Angela during her pregnancy) took over the role of flute, keyboards and backing vocals. A new studio album entitled Glass Shadows was released in early 2008 and an accompanying tour took place in spring and early summer. A 100-minute DVD, 'The Making of Glass Shadows', accompanied the special pre-order version of the album.

During October 2008, Mostly Autumn performed two gigs with an alternative, semi-acoustic line-up in support of the Bad Shepherds. The line-up consisted of Bryan Josh (guitar and vocals), Olivia Sparnenn (lead vocals), Andy Smith (bass), Anne-Marie Helder (keyboards and flute) and Robbie Baxter (drums). This tour was truncated after the Bad Shepherds cancelled many dates.

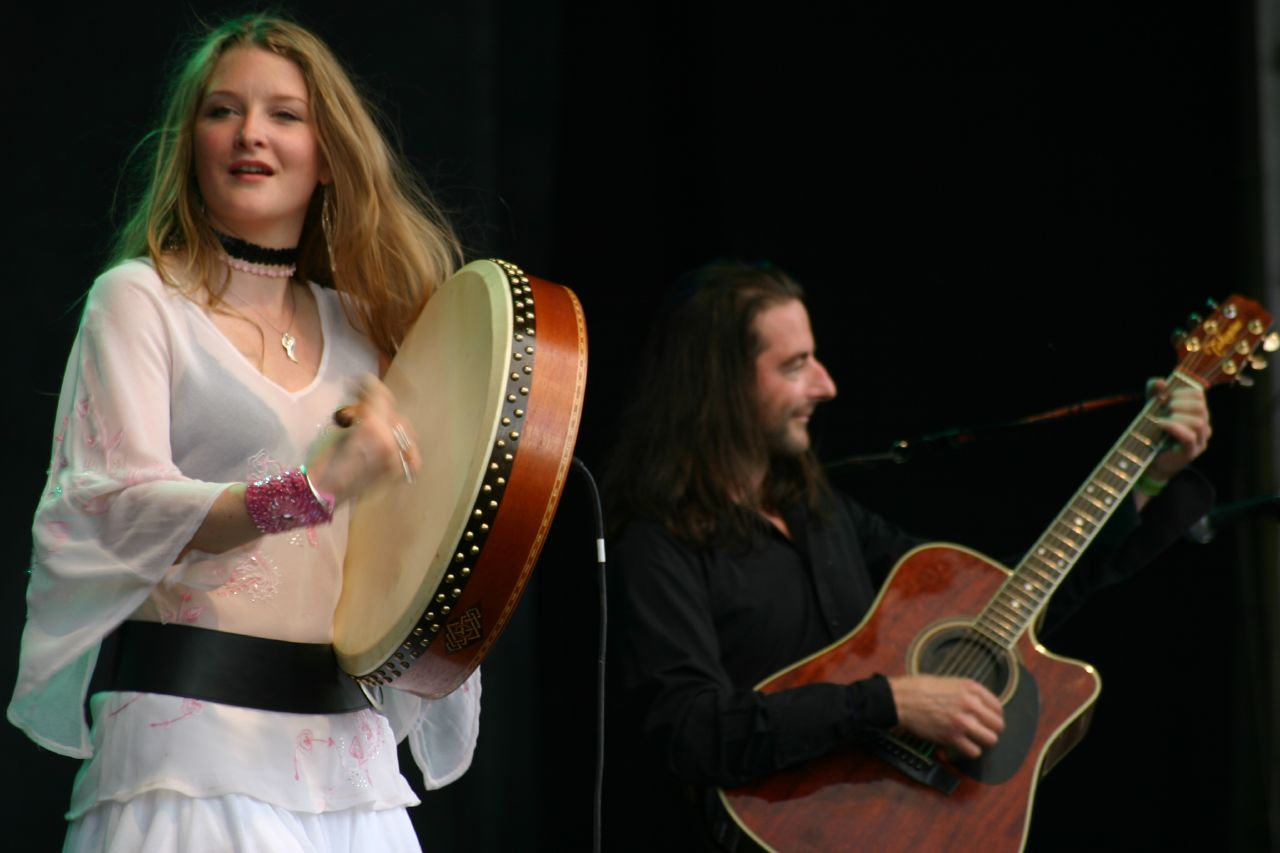
Former members, Heather Findlay and Liam Davison performing with the band in 2004.

Mostly Autumn have their own independent record label and choose to finance each album release itself. The group typically prints a limited edition of each album and sells those to cover their recording costs. A retail version of the album is then made available via retail outlets, distributors, the group's concerts and through their website.

Up to and including Heart Full of Sky (2006), Mostly Autumn's albums have started with the last few seconds of the previous album's final song. This tradition was dropped with the release of Glass Shadows (2008).

At the beginning of 2010, Heather Findlay announced her intention to leave the band to focus on solo work and on her family. She performed her last gig with the band at Leamington Spa Assembly on 2 April 2010. This was filmed, and released as a 2-disc DVD under the name That Night in Leamington, which also included a 30-minute interview with Josh and Findlay. After her departure, Olivia Sparnenn stepped into the lead role, and the band's next album Go Well Diamond Heart was released in 2010.

Bryan Josh and Olivia Sparnenn were married on 21 June 2013.

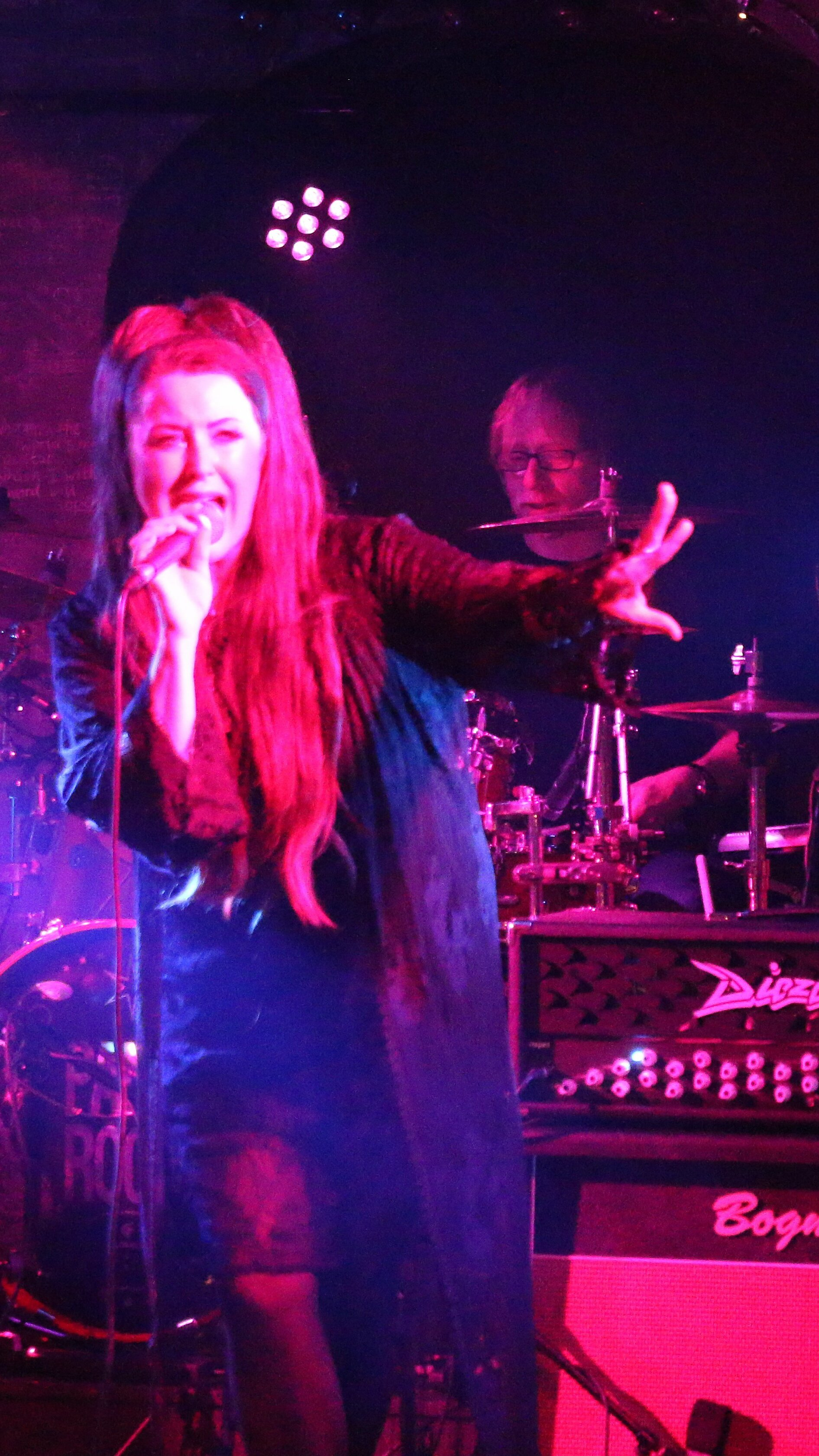
Anne-Marie Helder and Gavin Griffiths both departed the band in 2013 to focus on their other band, Panic Room

From mid-2013 onwards, Helder and Griffiths were absent from the band's touring line-up due to other commitments; their positions being temporarily filled by keyboardist Hannah Hird and drummer Alex Cromarty. In March 2014, it was revealed by Bryan Josh on the band's official website that Griffiths had decided to leave the band and that Cromarty was now his official replacement. With this line-up the band then recorded their eleventh album, Dressed in Voices. In May 2014, shortly prior to the release of Dressed in Voices, Josh announced that founding member Liam Davison had left the band and had been replaced by returning member Chris Johnson, and this new line-up recorded the live album Box of Tears.

In the autumn of 2014, Josh and Sparnenn – as "Mostly Autumn Acoustic" – supported Steve Hackett on the UK leg of his "Genesis Extended" tour.

In mid-2015, former Mostly Autumn flautist and keyboardist Angela Gordon replaced Hannah Hird in the band's touring line-up; whilst no official statement was made at the time, the band have now acknowledged that Gordon had officially replaced Helder in the band's line-up, and with this new line-up the band recorded its next album, Sight of Day.

On 5 November 2017, the band announced that founding guitarist Liam Davison had died.

== Side-projects ==
Founding members Bryan Josh, Liam Davison, Heidi Widdop, Alun Hughes, Bob Faulds and Chris Walton played in the Pink Floyd/1970s tribute band One Stoned Snowman. They disbanded at the end of 1995, largely due to the popularity of Mostly Autumn.

Liam Davison and Alun Hughes played with the hard rock band Life Support from their founding in 1994 until leaving at the same time during 1996. Life Support split up in 1999.

Heather Findlay contributed to Arjen Lucassen's 'Ayreon' project on The Human Equation album in 2004, singing the part of "Love".

Iain Jennings left the band at the beginning of 2006 to pursue his own musical ambitions and formed his own band, Breathing Space, as well as contributing to projects by other artists and even becoming a Music Technology teacher at Huntington School, York, a local Comprehensive. He recruited then-Mostly Autumn backing vocalist Olivia Sparnenn to sing lead vocals and the pair, along with various other musicians recorded three albums. Despite his return to the Mostly Autumn fold in 2008, Iain remained a member and core songwriter in Breathing Space. In April 2010, Sparnenn took over lead vocals in Mostly Autumn so decided to stop working with Breathing Space. Breathing Space continued for a short while with original Mostly Autumn vocalist Heidi Widdop, before splitting up.

During 2005 Heather Findlay and Angela Gordon formed an acoustic side project called Odin Dragonfly (an anagram of their surnames), making live appearances both as a support act and as headliners. In August 2007 they released their first album, Offerings, which was followed by Sirens in 2022.

Both Anne-Marie Helder and Gavin Griffiths are members of Panic Room, and were previously members of Karnataka.

Following a one off project in 2019 involving Iain Jennings and York rock band Godson (which includes founding Mostly Autumn bassist Alun Hughes), Iain became a full member of Godson in August 2020. They subsequently changed their name to The Tower Radio and are working on their eponymous first album. This has been delayed by COVID-19 restrictions and is now planned for release in 2022.

== Members ==
=== Current members ===
Image	Name	Years active	Instruments	Release contributions
	Bryan Josh	1995–present	lead and backing vocals; lead guitar; keyboards	all releases
	Iain Jennings	1995–2006; 2007–present	keyboards; backing vocals	all releases, except Glass Shadows (2008)
	Angela Gordon née Goldthorpe	1999–2007; 2015–present	flutes; keyboards; recorders; whistles; percussion; backing vocals	all releases from For All We Shared... (1998) to Heart Full of Sky (2006) and from Sight of Day (2017) onwards
	Andy Smith	2000–present	bass	all releases from The Last Bright Light (2001) onwards
	Olivia Sparnenn-Josh	2004–present	lead and backing vocals; percussion; keyboards	all releases from Storms over London Town (2006) onwards
	Chris Johnson	2006–2007; 2014–present	rhythm & acoustic guitars; keyboards; backing and lead vocals	Heart Full of Sky (2006); all releases from Box of Tears (2015) onwards
	Henry Rogers	2018–present	drums	all releases from White Rainbow (2019) onwards

=== Former members ===
Image	Name	Years active	Instruments	Release contributions
	Liam Davison	1995–2007; 2007–2014 (died 2017)	rhythm, lead & acoustic guitars; backing and occasional lead vocals	all releases until Dressed in Voices (2014), except Glass Shadows (2008)
	Bob Faulds	1995–2000	violins	For All We Shared... (1998); The Spirit of Autumn Past (1999)
	Kev Gibbons	1995–1999	whistles	For All We Shared... (1998)
	Heidi Widdop	1995–1996	vocals	none
	Alun Hughes	1995–1996	bass; keyboards	none
	Chris Walton	1995–1996	drums	none
	Stuart Carver	1996–2000	bass	For All We Shared... (1998); The Spirit of Autumn Past (1999)
	Allan Scott	1996–1999	drums	For All We Shared... (1998)
	Heather Findlay	1996–2010	lead and backing vocals; acoustic guitars; keyboards; recorders; whistles; percussion	all releases until That Night in Leamington (2010)
	Rob McNeil	1999–2000	drums	The Spirit of Autumn Past (1999)
	Jonathan Blackmore	2000–2004	drums	all releases from The Last Bright Light (2001) to The Next Chapter (2003)
	Andrew Jennings	2004–2007; 2007	drums	The V Shows (2004); Pink Floyd Revisited (2004); Storms Over Still Water (2005)
	Gavin Griffiths	2007 (touring); 2009–2014	drums	all releases from Live 2009 (CD 2009) to The Ghost Moon Orchestra (2012)
	Anne-Marie Helder	2007–2015	flutes; keyboards; acoustic guitars; recorders; whistles; percussion; backing vocals	all releases from Glass Shadows (2008) to Box of Tears (CD 2015); White Rainbow (2019)
	Henry Bourne	2007–2008	drums	Glass Shadows (2008)
	Robbie Baxter	2008–2009	drums	none
	Alex Cromarty	2014–2018 (touring 2013–2014)	drums	Dressed in Voices (2014); Box of Tears (CD 2015); Sight of Day (2017)

=== Touring members ===
Image	Name	Years active	Instruments	Release contributions
	Ben Matthews	2005; 2006 (guest)	keyboards; guitars; backing vocals	Storms over London Town (CD 2006)
	Hannah Hird	2013–2015 (substitute for Helder)	keyboards; percussion; backing vocals	

== Discography ==
=== Studio albums ===
- For All We Shared... (1998)
- The Spirit of Autumn Past (1999)
- The Last Bright Light (2001)
- Music Inspired by The Lord of the Rings (2001)
- Passengers (2003)
- Storms Over Still Water (2005)
- Heart Full of Sky (2006)
- Glass Shadows (2008)
- Go Well Diamond Heart (2010)
- The Ghost Moon Orchestra (2012)
- Dressed in Voices (2014)
- Sight of Day (2017)
- White Rainbow (2019)
- Graveyard Star (2021)
- Seawater (2025)
- Life in the Mirror (2026)

=== Live albums ===
- The Story So Far... (CD and VHS 2001)
- Live in the USA (CD 2003)
- The Fiddler's Shindig (CD 2003, DVD 2005)
- Live at the Canterbury Fayre (CD 2003)
- Live at the Grand Opera House (CD & DVD 2003)
- The Next Chapter (DVD 2003)
- The V Shows (DVD 2004, CD 2005)
- Pink Floyd Revisited (DVD 2004)
- Storms over London Town (CD 2006)
- Live 2009 (CD 2009)
- That Night in Leamington (CD & DVD 2010)
- Live at High Voltage (CD 2011)
- Still Beautiful Live 2011 (CD 2011)
- Live at the Boerderij (CD & DVD 2012)
- Box of Tears (CD 2015)
- Acoustic in support of the Genesis revisited tour 2014 (CD 2015)
- Back In These Arms. Recorded at De Boerderij, NL - 4th June 2022 (2CD 2022)
- Studio 2, Live recordings from studio 2 Abbey Road Studios 19/20 april 2022 (CD 2023).

=== Anthologies ===
- Heroes Never Die – The Anthology (2002, deleted)
- Catch the Spirit – The Complete Anthology (2002)
- Pass the Clock (2009)

=== Singles and EPs ===
- "Goodbye Alone" (2001)
- "Prints in the Stone" (2001)
- "Spirits of Christmas Past" (2005)
