= Bryan Josh =

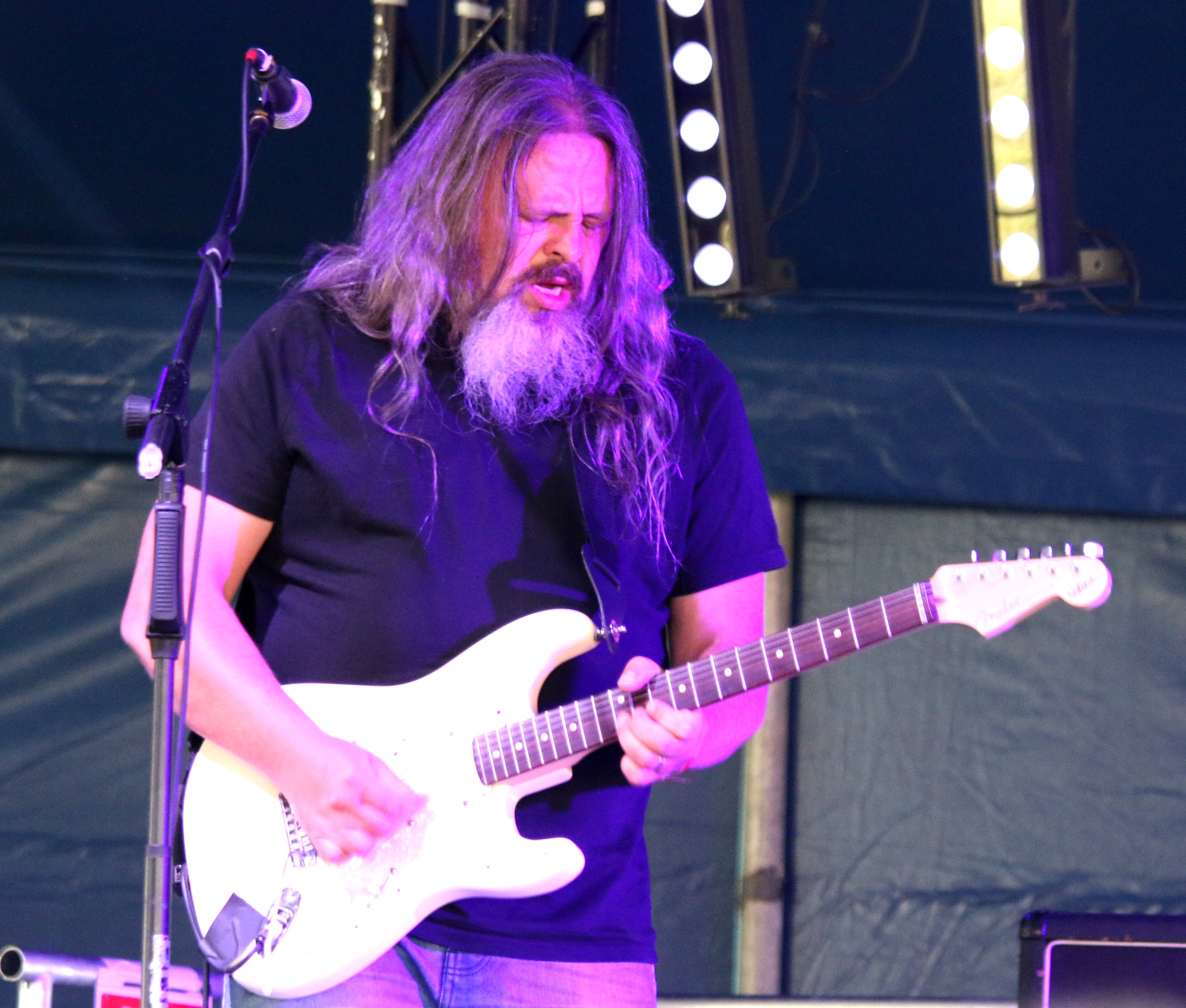
- Josh in 2018

Background information
- Genres: Progressive rock
- Occupation(s): Musician, songwriter
- Instrument(s): Vocals, guitar, bass guitar, keyboards
- Labels: Mostly Autumn

Bryan Josh (born 1967) is a musician who is the founder of British progressive rock band Mostly Autumn. While primarily being the band's co-lead singer (previously with Heidi Widdop and Heather Findlay, and presently with Olivia Sparnenn) and lead guitarist, he has performed on many other instruments in the studio, which include the bass guitar, piano and keyboards. He, either alone or with other members of the band, has written a large percentage of the band's back catalogue. He also contributed to Mostly Autumn keyboardist Iain Jennings' solo album Breathing Space where he played two guitar solos.

In November 2008, he released his first solo album Through These Eyes on Mostly Autumn Records. This features Mostly Autumn members Olivia Sparnenn and Gavin Griffiths, ex-Mostly Autumn member Henry Bourne and other guest musicians.

In 2009 he guested with Breathing Space, playing live with them. His position in the band was only temporary as they searched for a permanent replacement. Towards the end of the year he also played three live dates showcasing the material from Through These Eyes. He was joined by Olivia Sparnenn (vocals/percussion), Chris Johnson (guitar/keyboards/vocals), Iain Jennings (keyboards), Patrick Berry (bass guitars) and Gavin Griffiths (drums). On 4 April 2010, Josh played his final concert as lead guitarist of Breathing Space.

On 21 June 2013 Josh married Mostly Autumn vocalist Olivia Sparnenn, and on 31 March 2017 they revealed that Sparnenn was pregnant with their first child.

== Discography ==
=== Breathing Space ===
- Below the Radar Live (2010)

=== Solo ===
- Through These Eyes (2008)
- Transylvania – part 1 -The Count demands it (2016)
