= Ramona (name) =

- Pronunciation: /rəˈmoʊnə/
- Gender: female
- Language: Spanish, Old German and Romanian

Origin
- Meaning: wise protector, decision and protector

Other names
- Related names: Mona

Ramona is usually a feminine given name, the feminine form of Ramon (Spanish) and Raymond (Old German), meaning "wise protector". Today, it is used in Spain, Romania, the Republic of Moldova, Italy, and Portugal, and in some countries of Latin America and North America. It was made popular by the 19th century novel Ramona and by a series of Ramona children's books by Beverly Cleary.

The name Ramona was a popular first name for women (rank 296 of 4276) in the United States in 1960.

== Notable people ==
- Ramona (vocalist) (1909–1972), American cabaret- and jazz singer and pianist
- Avril Ramona Lavigne (born 1984), Canadian singer, songwriter, and actress
- Comandante Ramona (1959–2006), Mexican revolutionary officer
- Ramona Africa, American spokesperson of the organization MOVE (Philadelphia organization)
- Ramona Amiri, Canadian winner of the 2005 Miss World Canada beauty pageant
- Ramona Andra Langley (born 1992), American electronic musician
- Ramona Ash, Cook Islands former international lawn bowler
- Ramona Attard, Maltese politician
- Ramona Bachmann (born 1990), Swiss professional footballer
- Ramona Badescu (born 1968), Romanian-Italian actress, singer, model, television personality, and politician
- Ramona Badescu (author), Romanian-born French author of children's literature
- Ramona Balthasar (born 1964), German rower
- Ramona Barnes (1938–2003), American politician
- Ramona Barrufet i Santacana (born 1959), Spanish Catalan teacher and politician
- Ramona Bass, American wife of heir, businessman, and philanthropist Lee Bass
- Ramona Bennett (born 1938), American Puyallup leader and activist
- Ramona Berni (1887–1968), Spanish anarcho-syndicalist militant
- Ramona Bressie (1894–1970), American literary scholar
- Ramona Brooks (1951–2014), American singer and actress
- Ramona Brussig (born 1977), German Paralympic judoka
- Ramona Cheorleu (born 1982), Romanian television presenter and model
- Ramona d'Viola (born 1958), American cyclist
- Ramona Depares (born 1975), Maltese author, journalist, and theatre critic
- Ramona Diaz, Filipino-American documentary film director and producer
- Ramona Douglass (?–2007), American activist
- Ramona Edelin (1945–2024), American academic, activist, and consultant
- Ramona Elena Verman (born 2004), Romanian long jumper
- Ramona Elsener (born 1992), Swiss ice dancer
- Ramona Farcău (born 1979), Romanian retired handballer
- Ramona Ferreira (1870–?), Paraguayan journalist and feminist
- Ramona Forchini (born 1994), Swiss racing cyclist
- Ramona Fradon (1926–2024), American comics artist
- Ramona Frendo (born 1971), Maltese jurist
- Ramona Fricosu, American woman who was required to reveal her hard drive password
- Ramona Fuhrer (born 1979), Swiss ice hockey player
- Ramona Galarza (1940–2020), Argentine folk singer
- Ramona Gilmour-Darling (born 1975), Canadian actress
- Ramona Go, Filipino army brigadier general and politician
- Ramona Gray, American biochemist; contestant on Survivor (American TV series)
- Ramona Hacks (born 1994), German badminton player
- Ramona Härdi (born 1997), Swiss speed-skater
- Ramona Hernández, Dominican Republic-born American community leader, sociologist, historian, and professor
- Ramona Hoh (born 1979), Canadian former para-alpine skier
- Ramona-Ioana Bruynseels (born 1980), Romanian jurist and politician
- Ramona Jennex (born 1955), Canadian politician
- Ramona Johari (c. 1967–2005), Singaporean murder victim
- Ramona Kapheim (born 1958), East German rower
- Ramona Karlsson (born 1981), Swedish former racing driver
- Ramona Koval (born 1954), Australian broadcaster, writer, and journalist
- Ramona Langley (1893–1983), American silent film actress
- Ramona Lee Hayes (?–2006), American wife of broadcaster and author Art Bell
- Ramona Lisa, alternate name of Caroline Polachek (born 1985), American singer, producer, and songwriter
- Ramona Lofton, real name of Sapphire (author), American author and performance poet
- Ramona Lubo (1865–1922), Cahuilla basketmaker
- Ramona Luengen (born 1960), Canadian composer, choir conductor, and educator
- Ramona M. Valdez (1984–2005), Dominican Republic-born American Marine
- Ramona Maier, several people
- Ramona Mănescu (born 1972), Romanian politician and lawyer
- Ramona Maria Ciobanu (born 1984), Romanian platform diver
- Ramona Marquez (born 2001), English child actress
- Ramona Martinez (born 1943), American politician and businesswoman
- Ramona Martínez (born 1996), Paraguayan professional footballer
- Ramona Martínez (nurse), Paraguayan enslaved nurse
- Ramona McCarthy Hawkins (1928–2018), African-American pharmacist and research chemist
- Ramona Medina (1977–2020), Argentine feminist activist
- Ramona Milano, Canadian actress
- Ramona Moore, American murder victim
- Ramona Nerra (born 1979), Romanian singer and songwriter
- Ramona Neubert (born 1958), East German former heptathlete
- Ramona Padio (born 1998), Papua New Guinean footballer
- Ramona Pagel (born 1961), American retired shot putter
- Ramona Papaioannou (born 1989), Greek Cypriot sprinter
- Ramona Parra (1926–1946), Chilean Nitrate worker and communist
- Ramona Pérez, American cultural anthropologist and professor
- Ramona Petraviča (born 1967), Latvian politician and financier
- Ramona Petzelberger (born 1992), German professional footballer
- Ramona Pop (born 1977), Romanian-born German politician
- Ramona Pop (athlete) (born 1982), Romanian athlete and former high jumper
- Ramona Portwich (born 1967), East German canoe sprinter and marathon canoeist
- Ramona Pringle (born 1982), Canadian digital journalist, television host, multiplatform media producer, actress, and professor
- Ramona Reinke, German retired swimmer
- Ramona Reyes (born 1967), Mapuche Chilean politician
- Ramona Rhodes, American geriatrician, physician, and former associate professor of internal medicine
- Ramona Riley-Bozier, American college volleyball coach
- Ramona Ripston (1927–2018), American activist
- Ramona Romero, American lawyer and former government official
- Ramona Roth (born 1977), German cross-country skier
- Ramona Sakiestewa (born 1948), Hopi Native American contemporary artist
- Ramona Shelburne (born 1979), American sportswriter and softball player
- Ramona Siebenhofer (born 1991), Austrian alpine ski racer
- Ramona Singer (born 1956), American TV personality, businesswoman, and author; contestant on The Real Housewives of New York City
- Ramona Solberg (1921–2005), American jewelry designer and teacher
- Ramona Stewart (1922–2006), American author
- Ramona Straub (born 1993), German ski jumper
- Ramona Strugariu (born 1979), Romanian politician
- Ramona T. Mercer (born 1929), American health- and wellness writer and nursing theorist
- Ramona Theresia Hofmeister (born 1996), German snowboarder
- Ramona Trinidad Iglesias-Jordan (1889–2004), Puerto Rican supercentenarian
- Ramona Urassa, Tanzanian wife of politician January Makamba
- Ramona Victoria Epifanía Rufina Ocampo, birth name of Victoria Ocampo (1890–1979), Argentine writer and intellectual
- Ramona Villagomez Manglona (born 1967), American chief judge
- Ramona Vitalyevna Grabchenko, American wife of criminal Robert Jonathan Seacat
- Ramona Vogt, American high-energy physicist
- Ramona von Boeckman, American former basketball player
- Ramona Walther, East German canoe sprinter
- Ramona Wenzel (born 1963), German diver
- Ramona Wulf (born 1954), German singer
- Ramona Young (born 1998), American actress
- Ramona Zamzam (born 1990), Malaysian actress, model, television host, and businesswoman

== Fictional characters ==
- Ramona, in the UK children's TV series The Ark (2001–2004)
- Ramona, in the 1884 US novel Ramona
- Ramona, in the US comedy horror TV series Santa Clarita Diet, played by Ramona Young
- Ramona Badwolf, in the fashion doll franchise and Netflix series Ever After High, played by Cindy Robinson
- Ramona Derby, in the New Zealand prime-time soap opera Shortland Street, played by Ashleigh Seagar
- Ramona Flowers, in the Scott Pilgrim series
- Ramona Gibbler, in US sitcom Fuller House, played by Soni Nicole Bringas
- Ramona Nowitzki, in the US TV sitcom The Big Bang Theory, played by Riki Lindhome
- Ramona Ortega, in the 2002 US young adult historical fiction novel Esperanza Rising
- Ramona Quimby, in a US children's novel series; played by Sarah Polley in the 1988 Canadian TV series Ramona; played by Joey King in the 2010 US family adventure comedy drama film Ramona and Beezus
- Ramona Ramirez, in the UK comedy-drama TV series Cold Feet, played by Jacey Sallés
- Ramona Royale, in the US horror anthology TV series American Horror Story: Hotel, played by Angela Bassett
