= Ramona (disambiguation) =

Ramona is an 1884 novel by Helen Hunt Jackson.

Ramona may also refer to:

== Arts and entertainment ==
- Adaptations of Jackson's novel:
  - Ramona (1910 film), directed by D. W. Griffith
  - Ramona (1916 film), directed by Donald Crisp
  - Ramona (1928 film), directed by Edwin Carewe
  - Ramona (1936 film), directed by Henry King
  - Ramona (1946 film), directed by Victor Urruchua
  - Ramona (2000 TV series), a Mexican telenovela
  - The Ramona Pageant, a 1923 annual outdoor play depicting Jackson's novel
- Ramona (novel series), by Beverly Cleary
  - Ramona (1988 TV series), a Canadian series based on Cleary's novels, starring Sarah Polley
  - Ramona Quimby, the title character of Cleary's books
- Ramona (1961 film), a 1961 West German musical film directed by Paul Martin
- "Ramona" (1928 song), a popular song from the 1928 film
- "Ramona" (Dragon song), a 1982 song by Australian-New Zealand band Dragon
- Ramona (Mexican band), psychedelic rock band performing since 2011
- "Ramona", a song by Guster from Keep It Together
- "Ramona", a song by The Ramones from Rocket to Russia
- "To Ramona", a song by Bob Dylan from Another Side of Bob Dylan (1964)
- Ramona (2003 TV series), a Swedish miniseries starring Björn Bengtsson
- Ramona (computer program), a fictional computer avatar created by Ray Kurzweil
- SS Ramona, a fictional ship in the Tintin comic The Red Sea Sharks
- Ramona Films, movie production company for the film The Disaster Artist
- Ramona Flowers, an American expatriate from the graphic novels Scott Pilgrim

== People ==
- Ramona (name), a given name
- Ramona (vocalist) (1909–1972), American 1930s cabaret singer and pianist
- Ramona Band of Cahuilla, in Riverside County, California, U.S.
- Ramona Bressie (1894–1970), American medievalist
- Ramona Ferreira, Paraguayan journalist and feminist
- Ramona Fradon (1926–2004), American comics artist
- Comandante Ramona (1959–2006), Mexican guerrilla leader of the Zapatista Army of National Liberation (EZLN)
- Ramona Johari (1967–2005), Singaporean murder victim

== Places ==
- Ramona, Los Angeles County, California, an unincorporated community named after Jackson's novel
- Ramona, San Diego County, California, an unincorporated community also named after Jackson's novel
  - Ramona Valley AVA, California wine region in San Diego County
  - Ramona Airport
- Ramona, Kansas
- Ramona, Oklahoma, a town named after Jackson's novel
- Ramona, South Dakota

== Highways ==
- The San Bernardino Freeway, formerly called the Ramona Freeway.
- Ramona Boulevard, a long street in Los Angeles County.

== Other uses ==
- Ramona (sternwheeler 1892), a North American river vessel
- Ramona passive sensor, a Czech passive sensor system

== See also ==
- Ramona High School (disambiguation)
