= Basic training (disambiguation) =

Basic training or Basic Training may refer to:

== General ==
- Basic training for any set of skills, occupation, trade, or profession
  - Recruit training, in military
    - United States Army Basic Training
  - Compulsory Basic Training, a preliminary vehicular training course in the United Kingdom

== Film ==
- Basic Training, a 1971 American documentary directed by Frederick Wiseman
- Basic Training (1985 film), an American sex comedy

== Television ==
- "Basic Training", Ben 10: Ultimate Alien season 2, episode 8 (2011)
- "Basic Training", Canada's Worst Driver 5 episode 1 (2009)
- "Basic Training", Chef Academy episode 3 (2009)
- "Basic Training", Curious George season 13, episode 3 (2020)
- "Basic Training", Family Ties season 7, episode 8 (1989)
- "Basic Training", Fuller House season 5 part 2, episode 14 (2020)
- "Basic Training", Gangland season 1, episode 11 (2008)
- "Basic Training", G.I. Joe: A Real American Hero season 2, episode 19 (1992)
- "Basic Training", Hot Wheels: Battle Force 5 season 1, episode 4 (2009)
- "Basic Training", Inspector Gadget, season 1, episode 20 (1983)
- "Basic Training", Missing season 1, episode 14 (2003)
- "Basic Training", On the Road with Austin & Santino episode 2 (2010)

== Other uses ==
- Basic Training: Boot Camp Clik's Greatest Hits an album by American hip hop collective Boot Camp Clik

== See also ==
- The Basic Training of Pavlo Hummel, play by David Rabe
