= Ryanair p.l.c. v Aer Rianta c.p.t. =

Irish Supreme Court case

Ryanair P.L.C. v Aer Rianta C.P.T.
- Coat of arms of Ireland
- Court: Supreme Court of Ireland
- Full case name: Ryanair P.L.C. v Aer Rianta C.P.T. [2003] 4 IR 264
- Decided: 2nd Day December 2003
- Citation: [2003] IESC 62, [2003] 4 IR 264, [2004] 1 ILRM 241

Case history
- Appealed from: The Irish High Court
- Appealed to: The Irish Supreme Court

Court membership
- Judges sitting: Fennelly J., McCracken J., and Denham J.

Case opinions
- The applicant does not have to prove that the documents sought to be discovered are in any sense absolutely necessary but rather that he would suffer a litigious disadvantage by not seeing them.
- Decision by: Fennelly J., and McCracken J.
- Concurrence: Denham J.

Keywords
- Discovery, Necessity, Relevance

Ryanair p.l.c. v Aer Rianta c.p.t. [2003] IESC 62; [2003] 4 IR 264 is a reported Irish Supreme Court case that dealt with the law of discovery. In his judgement, Fennelly J. reinforced the test that discovery will only be granted if the court is satisfied that the documents sought are: (i) relevant to the issues in the proceedings; and (ii) that discovery is necessary for fairly disposing of the matter and for saving costs. The court noted that in order for documents to satisfy this test the applicant does not have to prove that they are, "in any sense absolutely necessary". Rather all he has to do is prove that he would suffer a "litigious disadvantage by not seeing them". The burden of proof rests firmly on the party seeking the discovery.

== Background ==
In September 1999, Ryanair alleged that Aer Rianta (now Dublin Airport Authority) had committed (and was continuing to commit) various breaches "of both national and European Community competition law". In particular, Ryanair alleged that Aer Rianta, as operator of the Dublin, Cork and Shannon Airports, was the main provider of essential services and facilities to airlines using those airports. Ryanair also alleged that Air Rianta used its dominant position and its relationship with Aer Lingus to favour the latter at Ryanair's expense.

Solicitors for Ryanair wrote to Aer Rianta in December 2000 seeking voluntary discovery pursuant to order 31 rule 12(4) of the Rules of the Superior Courts, as amended by the provisions of statutory instrument No 233 of 1999 entitled Rules of the Superior Courts (2) (Discovery) 3rd August 1999. The request set out categories of documents under 15 headings. The request was supported by reasons and provided for documents to be provided. Aer Rianta claimed that many of the categories of documents sought were "irrelevant and not necessary to decide the matters at issue". Aer Rianta also claimed that Ryanair did not need the documents requested because they had "alternative means of establishing the relevant facts".

In the High Court, Ryanair sought an order compelling Aer Rianta to provide the documents they sought. In July 2002, Lavan J in the High Court granted Ryanair an order for discovery of all documents sought. Aer Rianta appealed to the Supreme Court.

== Holding of the Supreme Court ==
The Supreme Court upheld the High Court's decision, but varied the order of discovery. As a result, not all of the documents sought were granted by the Supreme Court as one request was seen not as a request for the discovery of documents, but as a result for information, another request was held as being "extremely vague and wide ranging", while another request for documents was amended by the Court.

The primary issue before the Court was considering whether the amendment of order 31 rule 12 of the Rules of the Superior Courts impacted the current laws of discovery greatly or not. Aer Rianta maintained the argument that Ryanair had failed to comply with the requirements of order 31 rule 12. Moreover the requests for discovery were too vague. In particular, Aer Rianta relied strongly on the judgement of Morris P. in Swords v Western Proteins Ltd. They said that following this decision "it was necessary for a party seeking discovery to specify the document or documents sought with precision and also to give such reasons as would demonstrate that their discovery was necessary". Ryanair argued that while "a procedural change had been effected, this did not change the basic law concerning discovery". Aer Rianta went on to argue that following the amendment of order 31 rule 12, discovery was now more difficult to obtain and that Ryanair had "other means of establishing most of the relevant facts". Ryanair submitted that the amendment to order 31 rule 12 introduced the requirement of a "preliminary request for voluntary discovery" and of a verifying affidavit. The effect was "to eliminate the right to obtain an order for general discovery or to obtain any discovery without a grounding affidavit".

The amendment to order 31 rule 12 meant three things. One, a party, before applying to the court, must obtain the agreement of the opposing party "to make voluntary discovery within a reasonable time frame". Second, they must mention the exact categories of documents for which they want voluntary discovery. Lastly, the party must submit an affidavit outlining that the discovery of the documents is necessary for the purposes of fairness. Nevertheless, as far as this case is concerned the Supreme Court concluded that the amendment to order 31 rule 12 did not change the parts concerning necessity. The only reason a court should adjourn or reject an application for discovery is if it fails to show that there is a requirement of fairness or for saving costs. Under the current rule, there is a burden on the applicant to demonstrate that there are valid reasons for each category of the documents which they are seeking. So the burden of proof is greater on the person bringing the application and this is the only effective change that has happened after the amendment.

The Court also restated the meaning of the words "disposing fairly of the cause or matter'' as given in order 31 rule 12 regarding necessity. The Court referred to the decision of Bingham MR in Taylor v Anderton who explained that this concepts means thinking about whether the documents are necessary for a "fair determination "of the issue at hand. Additionally, the purpose behind the rule is to make sure that one party does not suffer because the documents are not handed for inspection.

In conclusion, the Court held that Ryanair had satisfied the conditions of order 31 rule 12. However, the Court found that certain documents that Ryanair had requested were not necessary. The Court dismissed Aer Rianta's claims although varied the order of discovery.

== See also ==
- Supreme Court of Ireland
- Discovery (law)
- Affidavit
- Statutory instrument
- High Court (Ireland)
