= Beautiful & Twisted =

- Genre: Crime Drama
- Screenplay by: Teena Booth
- Directed by: Christopher Zalla
- Starring: Rob Lowe; Paz Vega; Candice Bergen
- Narrated by: Rob Lowe
- Theme music composer: Nathan Whitehead
- Country of origin: United States
- Original language: English

Production
- Producers: Kyle Clark; Damian Ganczewski; Lisa Wong
- Cinematography: Richard Wong
- Editor: Ian Silverstein
- Running time: 86 minutes
- Production company: Sony Pictures Television

Original release
- Network: Lifetime
- Release: January 31, 2015

Beautiful & Twisted, also known as The Novack Murders, is a 2015 American made-for-television crime drama film that premiered on Lifetime on January 31, 2015. The film stars Rob Lowe, Paz Vega, Seychelle Gabriel, Michelle Hurd, and Candice Bergen. It is based upon the heavily publicized 2009 murders of Bernice Novack and her son, Ben Novack Jr.

== Plot ==
Millionaire and Fontainebleau Miami Beach hotel heir Benji 'Ben' Novack, Jr. (Lowe) marries a stunning stripper, Narcisa 'Narcy' Véliz Pacheco (Vega). But their kinky-infested relationship, soon becomes tarnished by a sea of love and distrust. When Ben's mother, Bernice Novack (Bergen), is found dead in her home in Fort Lauderdale, Florida, her death is ruled out as an accidental fall. Ben’s suspicions surrounding Narcy lead to his demise at the hands of his ruthless wife. As police untangle a web of deviant behavior, Narcy emerges as the prime suspect, and her conviction for orchestrating the murders of both of her husband and mother-in-law soon follows.

== Cast ==
- Rob Lowe as Benji 'Ben' Novack Jr.
  - Zachary Rifkin as Young Ben
- Paz Vega as Narcisa 'Narcy' Véliz Pacheco-Novack
- Candice Bergen as Bernice Novack
  - Sharisse Baker-Benard as Young Bernice
- Seychelle Gabriel as May
  - Soni Bringas as Young May
- Michelle Hurd as Det. Sgt. Gloria Mosley
