= List of Fuller House episodes =

Fuller House is an American family sitcom and sequel to the 1987–95 television series Full House, airing as a Netflix original series. It was created by Jeff Franklin and is produced by Jeff Franklin Productions and Miller-Boyett Productions in association with Warner Horizon Television. The series follows D.J. Tanner-Fuller, a veterinarian and widowed mother of three sons, whose sister and best friend—the mother to a teenage daughter—provide support in her sons' upbringings by moving in with her. Most of the original series ensemble cast have reprised their roles on Fuller House, either as regular cast members or in guest appearances, with the exception of Mary-Kate and Ashley Olsen, who alternated in the role of Michelle Tanner on Full House.

During the course of the series, 75 episodes of Fuller House were released over five seasons, between February 26, 2016, and June 2, 2020. On January 31, 2019, the show was renewed for a fifth and final season of eighteen episodes. The first nine episodes premiered on December 6, 2019, with the final nine released on June 2, 2020.

== Series overview ==
Season	Episodes		Originally released
1	13		February 26, 2016
2	13		December 9, 2016
3	18	9	September 22, 2017
3	18	9	December 22, 2017
4	13		December 14, 2018
5	18	9	December 6, 2019
5	18	9	June 2, 2020

== Episodes ==
=== Season 1 (2016) ===
No. overall	No. in season	Title	Directed by	Written by	Original release date	Prod. code
1	1	"Our Very First Show, Again"	Mark Cendrowski	Jeff Franklin	February 26, 2016	2M7051
The Tanner and Katsopolis families (except Michelle who is busy with her fashion career) reunite for the final time before the family home is sold. However, they realize that newly-widowed D.J. is struggling to cope with the demands of raising three boys and holding down a full-time job as a veterinarian. Originally, Danny, Joey, Becky, and Jesse decide to stay, however, Stephanie decided that it was her turn to move with her sister alongside Kimmy who has always been with D.J. ever since they were young. Special guest stars: John Stamos as Jesse Katsopolis, Bob Saget as Danny Tanner, Dave Coulier as Joey Gladstone, Lori Loughlin as Rebecca Donaldson-Katsopolis, Blake and Dylan Tuomi Wilhoit as Nicky and Alex Katsopolis
2	2	"Moving Day"	Mark Cendrowski	Jeff Franklin	February 26, 2016	2M7052
Ramona and Kimmy move into the Tanner-Fuller house, and D.J. rearranges the bedrooms so Ramona does not have to live in a closet that was converted into a bedroom. However, Jackson is dissatisfied that he is losing his room and cannot accept the fact that he has to move in with his younger brother, Max. After Stephanie tells Jackson about a similar encounter that happened between her and his mother when they were little girls, revealing that D.J. secretly ran away by moving her bedroom into the garage, Jackson decides to flee as well by hiding in Uncle Jesse's car as he drives down to Los Angeles. During their first 'family meeting', D.J. assures Jackson that he will get accustomed to sharing a bedroom with Max the same way she and Stephanie did when their Uncle Jesse and their father's friend Joey moved in twenty-eight years ago. Special guest star: John Stamos as Jesse Katsopolis
3	3	"Funner House"	Katy Garretson	Amy Engelberg & Wendy Engelberg	February 26, 2016	2M7053
Stephanie and Kimmy decide to take D.J. on a girls' night out where they have an unwanted reunion with Kimmy's husband, Fernando. Meanwhile, Joey takes away the kids' electronics and instead has the kids involved in some mischievous, messy fun. Special guest star: Dave Coulier as Joey Gladstone, Macy Gray as herself
4	4	"The Not-So-Great Escape"	Katy Garretson	Andrew Gottlieb	February 26, 2016	2M7054
Ramona is upset about moving schools and convinces Jackson to help her escape. However, when Jackson is caught purposefully causing the fire alarm to go off and Ramona is caught escaping, both are suspended from school for three days. Meanwhile, Max is at the pet clinic choosing one of Comet Jr Jr's pups to take home, and while Stephanie is at a coffee shop with Tommy, she meets a nice guy, Darren, who mistakes Tommy for her son. After she is unable to afford her items, she goes to the pet clinic since D.J. asked her to. Darren follows with her items and mistakes Max for her child as well. Stephanie goes along with it and arranges a date with him. Afterwards, D.J. punishes Jackson and disagrees with Kimmy's lack of authoritative parenting style. Kimmy explains that since she and Fernando separated, Ramona was devastated so she just wants Ramona to be happy. D.J. convinces Kimmy to punish Ramona as well.
5	5	"Mad Max"	Rich Correll	Boyd Hale	February 26, 2016	2M7055
When an old friend whisks her away for a concert and after-hours fun, Stephanie realizes just how much her nephews mean to her. Meanwhile, Kimmy sets D.J. up on a date without D.J. knowing, and Ramona babysits Tommy, which includes a botched attempt she makes in disposing of Tommy's diaper. D.J.'s date arrives and she believes he is the plumber, leading to an awkward interaction between the two. It is revealed that Stephanie cannot have children.
6	6	"The Legend of El Explosivo"	Rich Correll	Julie Thacker Scully	February 26, 2016	2M7056
D.J. punishes Jackson, causing him to miss his favorite Mexican wrestling league, Lucha Kaboom. But that only leads to more action for the fans.
7	7	"Ramona's Not-So-Epic Party"	Rich Correll	Bryan Behar & Steve Baldikoski	February 26, 2016	2M7057
Steve tries setting up D.J.'s handsome coworker with Kimmy, and Ramona's much-anticipated 13th birthday party doesn't turn out as planned for anyone.
8	8	"Secrets, Lies and Firetrucks"	Joel Zwick	Bob Keyes & Doug Keyes	February 26, 2016	2M7058
When Max learns to lie, he also learns that lies can backfire. Meanwhile, the ladies of the house fall in love with secrets. Special guest star: Bob Saget as Danny Tanner
9	9	"War of the Roses"	Rich Correll	Polina Diaz & Joe Vargas	February 26, 2016	2M7059
When a thousand roses are delivered to the house, D.J., Kimmy, and Stephanie try to figure out which one of their admirers sent it. Meanwhile, the new family dog begins to hoard items from the house, including the note that was delivered with the flowers, while Max ends up in a sugar rush. Special guest stars: John Stamos as Jesse Katsopolis, Lori Loughlin as Rebecca Donaldson-Katsopolis
10	10	"A Giant Leap"	Rob Schiller	Story by : Amy Engelberg & Wendy Engelberg; Teleplay by : Julie Thacker Scully & Andrew Gottlieb	February 26, 2016	2M7060
Things get out of hand when Stephanie's new boyfriend, Hunter Pence of the San Francisco Giants, invites everyone to one of his baseball games. Stephanie is revealed to be the "mystery blond" who appears to be the source of Hunter's hitting slump because he gets distracted by Stephanie's loud cheering. Realizing she cannot handle the pressure of dating a famous athlete, she dumps him in front of the stadium. Meanwhile, Max tries to catch a foul ball for show-and-tell at school, D.J. reluctantly kisses Matt for the kiss cam only hours after kissing Steve at the house, and Jackson uses Dr. Harmon's credit card to buy an autographed jersey for Lola.
11	11	"Partnerships in the Night"	Katy Garretson	Story by : Boyd Hale; Teleplay by : Bryan Behar & Steve Baldikoski & Bob Keyes & Doug Keyes	February 26, 2016	2M7061
Dr. Harmon is retiring from the pet clinic, leaving D.J. convinced that she will be taking over the business soon. However, Matt is given the business as he is Dr. Harmon's son, leaving D.J. upset. Kimmy, who is planning the doctor's Indian-themed retirement party, hires Stephanie as a partner to help her with the workload. Ramona and Jackson borrow $50 from Max after downloading a virus-infected pirated movie and are at Max's mercy until the loan is paid off. At the retirement party, D.J. announces that she will leave Harmon Pet Care, however, Matt pulls her aside and tells her that he wants to give her half of the business.
12	12	"Save the Dates"	Jeff Franklin	Brian McAuley	February 26, 2016	2M7062
D.J. has a date with her past that catches her off guard, and Kimmy's date with Fernando is nothing but surprises. In the end, Fernando signs the divorce papers, only to repropose to Kimmy, and she happily accepts.
13	13	"Love Is in the Air"	Joel Zwick	Jeff Franklin	February 26, 2016	2M7063
When Jesse and Becky return to renew their vows, Kimmy and Fernando join in on the wedding. Matt and D.J. open up Harmon-Fuller Pet Care. A bachelorette party leads to trouble for D.J., who has to decide between Matt and Steve once and for all. When Kimmy sees how sad Ramona is having to leave the Fuller house, she gets cold feet. In the end, she chooses to stay engaged to Fernando, but not marry him, so that she and Ramona can stay with the Fullers. D.J. makes a decision, she decides to choose herself, feeling as though she is not prepared to fully commit to someone yet. The girls gladly celebrate the "she-wolf pack" being back and greater than ever. Special guest stars: John Stamos as Jesse Katsopolis, Lori Loughlin as Rebecca Donaldson-Katsopolis, Dave Coulier as Joey Gladstone

=== Season 2 (2016) ===
No. overall	No. in season	Title	Directed by	Written by	Original release date	Prod. code
14	1	"Welcome Back"	Rich Correll	Jeff Franklin	December 9, 2016	2M7451
DJ finally decides between Matt and Steve however, they reveal to her that they have girlfriends right before her annual back-to-school barbeque. They ask her if their girlfriends could come along with D.J. allowing it. Meanwhile, Stephanie meets Jimmy Gibbler, Kimmy's brother, and they eventually kiss only to be interrupted by Kimmy who reveals to Stephanie that Jimmy is her brother. Jackson learns that Lola doesn't have feelings for him which leads him to become sad. He does, however, try to impress her by doing a stunt during the barbeque but, it turns out that Lola already left. Max has to find a way to make a difference for a school project.
15	2	"Mom Interference"	Rich Correll	Boyd Hale	December 9, 2016	2M7452
Jackson decides to join the football team to impress Lola much to D.J.'s dismay. Matt and Steve bring their new girlfriends, Crystal and C.J. respectively, to game night at the Fuller house and Stephanie realizes she likes Kimmy's brother, Jimmy and she gives the relationship a shot.
16	3	"Ramona's Not-So-Epic First Kiss"	Rich Correll	Bryan Behar & Steve Baldikoski	December 9, 2016	2M7453
Ramona feels like she needs to have her first kiss already, leading her to kiss Jackson's friend Popko. Afterward, she develops feelings for him and is crushed to learn he has a girlfriend. D.J. and Stephanie crash a wedding for a girls' night out. There, D.J. falls for a man named Sean (Lachlan Buchanan), who turns out to be gay, and Stephanie accidentally tells D.J. out loud where it is revealed to Sean's grandparents.
17	4	"The Curse of Tanner Manor"	Rich Correll	Marsh McCall	December 9, 2016	2M7454
On Halloween, Jackson and Ramona decide to abandon their parents to go to a haunted house where Jimmy and Stephanie (working there as zombies) decide to teach them a lesson. Max's friend Taylor becomes his enemy when he blogs negatively about the Fuller house's Halloween decorations. D.J. throws a party for Max to impress Taylor, while Kimmy and Fernando dress up as Lucy and Ricky, and the former is upset when she is cut out of Fernando's planned performance at the party.
18	5	"Doggy Daddy"	Katy Garretson	Erin Cardillo & Richard Keith	December 9, 2016	2M7455
Matt and D.J. operate on Cosmo, who accidentally swallows a corn cob given to him to play with by Max, making Max wonder if he's good enough to care for the dog. Ramona has an audition for a major dance coach and must clear away Max's new chickens, three babies, and her parents. Matt breaks up with Crystal and begins dating D.J.
19	6	"A Fuller Thanksgiving"	Katy Garretson	Jordana Arkin	December 9, 2016	2M7456
D.J. wants Thanksgiving to be perfect for her family as well as Danny, Jesse, Becky, and the Katsopolis twins who are visiting; however, she is overwhelmed when Joey, his wife Ginger, and their four kids Phyllis, Lewis, Joan & Jerry join in on the festivities and learned that Michelle couldn't attend. Meanwhile, Becky wants to adopt a baby while Jesse is highly opposed, Danny undergoes a mid-life crisis, and Joey's kids make everybody miserable. Special guest stars: John Stamos as Jesse Katsopolis, Bob Saget as Danny Tanner, Dave Coulier as Joey Gladstone, Lori Loughlin as Rebecca Donaldson-Katsopolis, Blake and Dylan Tuomi-Wilhoit as Nicky and Alex Katsopolis
20	7	"Girl Talk"	Joanna Kerns	Nancy Cohen	December 9, 2016	2M7457
Stephanie reunites with Gia when they attempt to get their junior high school band, "Girl Talk", back together. D.J. and Gia still despise each other since Gia was a bad influence on Stephanie when she was a teenager. Popko and his girlfriend break up and he advances on Ramona, who rejects him and makes him decide to make a vengeful humiliating video of her. The video goes viral and leaves Ramona humiliated, so Jackson decides to handle the situation.
21	8	"A Tangled Web"	Joanna Kerns	Craig Shoemaker	December 9, 2016	2M7458
Stephanie writes a song for Jimmy, which he intends to make viral by creating a music video. D.J. meets Taylor's father (who is equally as conceited as Taylor) and is more determined than ever for Max to beat Taylor on a school project. Jackson and Ramona pet-sit Lola's tarantula, Spot, and things go awry when Spot climbs out of his tank.
22	9	"Glazed & Confused"	Mark Cendrowski	Eydie Faye	December 9, 2016	2M7459
Stephanie, Kimmy, and Fernando go to Los Angeles, the former to perform her new song on Danny and Becky's show, Kimmy to sneak her way into the spotlight, and Fernando to see the set of his favorite show. A woman from the adoption agency meets with Jesse and Becky to determine the legitimacy of their parenting skills. However, things go wrong when Jesse, Becky, Fernando, Stephanie, and the adoption woman get stuck inside a fake TV set jail cell. Danny, left without a co-host, begrudgingly has Kimmy help him. Back at home, Joey brings doughnuts to the Fuller house, making everyone sick and ruining D.J. and Matt's planned weekend away. Special guest stars: John Stamos as Jesse Katsopolis, Bob Saget as Danny Tanner, Dave Coulier as Joey Gladstone, Lori Loughlin as Rebecca Donaldson-Katsopolis
23	10	"New Kids in the House"	Rich Correll	Boyd Hale & Marsh McCall	December 9, 2016	2M7461
Kimmy buys concert tickets for New Kids on the Block for D.J.'s 39th birthday, but when she and Stephanie discover that the tickets are counterfeit, they attempt to make it up to D.J. by bringing the band to the house. Meanwhile, Fernando, Matt, Steve, and Max all believe that each of their birthday presents for D.J. outrank the others.
24	11	"DJ and Kimmy's High School Reunion"	Eric Dean Seaton	Bryan Behar & Steve Baldikoski	December 9, 2016	2M7463
D.J. and Kimmy reunite with old flames and enemies at their high school reunion, leading D.J. to wonder if she still has feelings for Steve, who reveals his intentions of proposing to C.J. Jackson creates a fake report card to make it appear he is a straight-A student, later telling Stephanie he feels like he's the only family member that isn't special.
25	12	"Nutcrackers"	Dave Coulier	Kate Spurgeon	December 9, 2016	2M7460
Lola is upset that Ramona's performance of the Mouse King in "The Nutcracker" will interfere with her attending Lola's Christmas Eve party. Max is happily introduced to C.J.'s daughter, Rose, both of whom are smitten with each other. Jimmy tells Stephanie he loves her, leaving her speechless and confused, but after a talk with D.J., she realizes she loves him too.
26	13	"Happy New Year, Baby"	Jeff Franklin	Jeff Franklin	December 9, 2016	2M7462
Stephanie is forced to tell Jimmy of her infertility when he reveals his dreams of having kids with her. Steve asks for D.J.'s help proposing to C.J., while D.J. herself waits for Matt to come home from India for the New Year's Eve party. When Jackson cooks up a scheme to rid himself, Ramona, Lola, and Popko of Max, Max and Rose work to get revenge on them. Jesse names Joey the godfather of his and Becky's new adopted daughter Pamela, leading to an argument between the two and Danny. D.J. reveals to Kimmy and Stephanie that when she had decided between Matt and Steve, she had picked Steve but is now happy with Matt and with Steve's new engagement to CJ. Special guest stars: John Stamos as Jesse Katsopolis, Bob Saget as Danny Tanner, Dave Coulier as Joey Gladstone, Lori Loughlin as Rebecca Donaldson-Katsopolis

=== Season 3 (2017) ===
No. overall	No. in season	Title	Directed by	Written by	Original release date
Part 1
27	1	"Best Summer Ever"	Rich Correll	Jeff Franklin	September 22, 2017
It's the first day of summer, and DJ has to break the news to Jackson that he has to go to summer school to get his history grade up. Steve and C.J. come over to tell everyone that they are getting married at the end of summer in Japan, and everyone is invited. Stephanie and Jimmy catch Fernando with another woman and think that he is cheating on Kimmy. Jackson comes home from school and reveals that someone drew on his face while he was sleeping in class. Right when Stephanie and Jimmy tell Kimmy that Fernando is cheating on her, Fernando and that woman walk in. The woman is actually a real estate agent; Fernando has bought the Gibbler family home for him, Kimmy and Ramona to all live in. The girls decline, but Jimmy volunteers to move in. The girl who drew on Jackson's face, Rocki, comes over to apologize; Rocki happens to be Gia's daughter.
28	2	"Break a Leg"	Rich Correll	Boyd Hale	September 22, 2017
DJ calls for an Uber, since Stephanie was out all night with her car. When she gets in the car, she finds out that Stephanie is her Uber driver, using her car for the service. With Stephanie trying to get her finances and other affairs in order, D.J. volunteers to be her life coach. Out on a fun run with D.J., Stephanie steps in a gopher hole and breaks her ankle. Kimmy wants to be Steve's wedding planner and convinces him to hire her. Fernando thinks everyone is sad that he is moving out. Max invites Rose over for a pool party. His friend Taylor comes over, makes fun of him for using a baby pool, and tries to impress Rose. Stephanie tells D.J. that she is perfect which D.J. tells her she is not, and reveals that she has a dark side which involves Oreos, romance novels, and that she schedules time to cry in her room because she gets overwhelmed at times. Stephanie confesses to her that she wants to become a mom someday, somehow.
29	3	"Declarations of Independence"	Rich Correll	Kellie R. Griffin	September 22, 2017
It's Danny Tanner's Annual 4th of July Barbecue, but it's not a great day for couples. Danny comes to town to do a Facebook live with DJ and Matt on pet safety, and also for the barbecue. Lola tells Ramona that she wants to break up with Jackson because he is too nice. During the interview, D.J. keeps cutting Matt off, which upsets him. Max gets mad at Rose when she laughs at him for getting cola all over himself. Stephanie gets frustrated that Jimmy won't help her even though she said she didn't need any help getting around, and Kimmy hates Fernando acting like an American. Things don't go well for Danny's clean pie eating contest when Matt gets pie on D.J., which leads to a food fight between everybody. Danny has had it and asks the couples to discuss their problems with each other. All the couples work it out, except for Jackson and Lola, who break up. With Jackson upset, D.J. tells him how she was upset when she and Steve broke up when they were teenagers. While Danny talks to Jackson about it, he unconsciously reveals problems in his own marriage, and lets it slip that he and Teri split up. Special guest star: Bob Saget as Danny Tanner
30	4	"My Little Hickey"	Jean Sagal	Maria Brown-Gallenberg	September 22, 2017
Ramona gets a hickey on her neck from Popko and doesn't want her mom to see it, so Stephanie comes to the rescue to hide it with makeup. Fernando manages to sneak into the house to hide from D.J., aided by a gate he added to the fence between his and the Fullers' yard. Jackson has a study group over, and one of his friends shocks Max by renaming Cosmo, who responds to the name Derrick. Kimmy surprises Ramona at laser tag, where she finds out about her hickey and freaks out. Kimmy wishes Ramona had come to her first instead of Stephanie, but then says it's alright to talk to D.J. and Stephanie, too.
31	5	"Uncle Jesse's Adventures in Babysitting"	Rich Correll	Eydie Faye	September 22, 2017
Uncle Jesse and baby Pamela come to visit while Becky is in New York. He ends up getting stuck taking care of the youngsters for the night, while the other adults have dinner at the Gibbler family home, which Fernando and Jimmy have restored to an earlier time, to surprise Kimmy. Jesse has a hard time getting Pamela to fall asleep, and needs to referee Max and Jackson, since they are fighting. Kimmy says that a ghost named Mr. Mutchnik lives in her house, but Stephanie refuses to believe it. During dinner, a painting and the chandelier fall down, among other things, causing Stephanie to start believing that the house is actually haunted. It turns out Jimmy rigged the whole thing at D.J.'s request so that Stephanie and Kimmy can get along. As Stephanie returns to her original belief, more scary things happen, but Jimmy is not behind those. Meanwhile, things get out of control for Jesse, which include a stove fire and Ramona's perm gone awry. Special guest star: John Stamos as Jesse Katsopolis
32	6	"M-M-M-My Ramona"	Jody Margolin Hahn	Jerry Collins	September 22, 2017
To win Ramona over, Fernando goes all out to make her bedroom at his house over the top so she will stay there more. The bedroom includes a frozen yogurt bar, dance studio, and bubble machine. Kimmy gets jealous and buys Ramona a pony. Ramona's parents try to one-up each other, but Fernando's motive for Ramona's room is to get Kimmy to live with him, as well as Ramona. Jackson rescues a fallen bird, which his mom appreciates; D.J. wants him to stop by the pet clinic after summer school, thinking Jackson will become a vet like her. Tommy rips apart Max's stuffed unicorn, Uni, and Stephanie tries to cheer him up by giving him Mr. Bear, but he declines. Stephanie is relieved and patches up Uni for Max.
33	7	"Say Yes to the Dress"	Rich Correll	Kate Spurgeon	September 22, 2017
During karaoke, D.J. and Steve sing "Summer Nights" together, which makes Matt and C.J. uncomfortable. Rocki comes over to study with Jackson and has to spend the night when Gia cannot make it back from her date to pick her up. Steve texts D.J. to come to the bridal shop to help him with some decisions. D.J. sees a pretty wedding dress and the shop owner lets her try it on. The owner takes a picture of the two together, and Steve finds out that D.J. is actually wearing C.J.'s dress. They see C.J. walking in, so D.J. acts like a mannequin to hide and tries unsuccessfully to make it out the door without getting noticed by C.J. D.J. assures C.J. that her past with Steve should not worry her as their wedding approaches. Stephanie is not invited to the red carpet premiere of the movie she sold her song to, so everyone throws a fake red carpet event for her. The kindness of the family has affected Rocki. D.J. tells Steve that their friendship will be different once he gets married.
34	8	"Maybe Baby"	Rich Correll	Alisha Ketry	September 22, 2017
Jackson prepares for his history final in summer school. Becky comes to visit and spends the day with Stephanie; she has made an appointment for Stephanie to get a pelvic ultrasound. Meanwhile, Joey decides to surprise everyone while he and his children are out on a road trip, but Max and Ramona are not happy about the visit. Kimmy teaches Joey how to discipline his children as they get rambunctious around Max and Ramona. The doctor tells Stephanie she has a few viable eggs and could use in vitro with a surrogate. D.J. is ready to celebrate Jackson receiving an A on his final, but discovers online that the grade was an F and goes to the school to complain about it. Jackson's teacher says he too was confused by the score, so he re-graded it by hand, and Jackson actually ended up with a 94. Danny, D.J., the Katsopolises and the Gibblers all chip in to pay for Stephanie's in vitro fertilization. Special guest stars: Dave Coulier as Joey Gladstone, Lori Loughlin as Rebecca Donaldson-Katsopolis
35	9	"Wedding or Not Here We Come"	Rich Correll	Bryan Behar & Steve Baldikoski	September 22, 2017
Everyone minus Tommy prepare to fly to Japan for Steve's wedding. Stephanie looks to find a sperm donor, and feels like it's way too soon in their relationship to ask Jimmy for a life long commitment. Popko asks Ramona if he can date other girls while she's away, and she decides to dump him. Kimmy accidentally blurts Stephanie's secret to Jimmy. Max and Fernando compete to see who can score a seat in first class. Max ends up winning because he boarded early and told the flight attendant that he has cancer, so the flight attendant gave him the first class seat out of sympathy. Jimmy surprises Stephanie on the plane to tell her that he wants to be her baby's father. Matt switches seats with Kimmy so he can tell Stephanie that he plans on proposing to D.J. in Japan. D.J. prepares to fall asleep by putting on her sleeping mask and music on. Thinking that Kimmy is sitting next to her, D.J. says that she was planning on telling Steve at the high school reunion that she was going to pick him to be her boyfriend instead of Matt, and that she feels like she is losing her soulmate. However, Kimmy and Steve switched seats because Steve asked Kimmy to console Fernando after he got stuck with cranky babies and stinky bathrooms, so he was the one who heard her confession and is in shock.
Part 2
36	10	"My Best Friend's Japanese Wedding"	Rich Correll	Marsh McCall	December 22, 2017
Everyone has arrived in Japan for the wedding. Steve tells Kimmy what D.J. said to him on the plane. C.J.'s maid of honor couldn't make it, so she has D.J. fill in. Matt proposes to D.J., to which she says yes as Steve watches the moment from behind some bushes. Ramona falls in love with Marius Yo of the Japanese boy band Sexy Zone after he saves her from being hit by a motorcycle, so he invites her to his show. While trying to use the bathroom, the toilet rips half of C.J.'s dress off, so Kimmy and D.J. borrow some kimonos for her and Steve to wear. D.J. tells Stephanie and Kimmy that Matt proposed, and Kimmy tells her that she confessed her feelings about Steve not to her, but to Steve. It's time for the wedding to start, and things don't end well for either couple.
37	11	"Troller Coaster"	Mark Cendrowski	Nick Fascitelli	December 22, 2017
D.J. doesn't know what's going on between her and Steve, so for now she's single. Ramona gets into the San Francisco School of the Performing Arts. Stephanie starts taking hormone shots for in vitro. D.J., Max and Jackson go to Mighty Mountain to ride the Troller Coaster. Ramona has second thoughts about going to dance school. Steve and D.J. decide to wait a month before they jump into things.
38	12	"Fast Times at Bayview High"	Rich Correll	Eydie Faye & Kate Spurgeon	December 22, 2017
It's the first day of high school for Jackson and Ramona. Stephanie and Jimmy visit the fertility clinic in hopes of making an embryo. Lola moves to Fresno, which makes Jackson and Ramona sad. Ramona tries out for the school's dance team, and the team captain, Chad, cuts her for showing him up. Matt returns from an eight-day vacation in Bora Bora and says he's moving to the islands. Jackson becomes the joke of the school when he slips and falls on some bologna at lunch. Matt and D.J. get trapped in the examining room when someone drops off an alligator at the clinic. Rocki starts a rumor that Jackson is the best kisser at Bayview to counteract him being "Bologna Boy". He now becomes "Full Lips Fuller". Matt is not sure if he can see D.J. everyday if they're not together, so he needs to take some time off to see how he feels. Fernando returns to racing. The dance team captain later admits Ramona is good and lets her on the team. Stephanie receives good news: she has three viable eggs.
39	13	"A Tommy Tale"	Christian Jensen	Marsh McCall	December 22, 2017
D.J. tries to get Tommy into a prestigious preschool. Due to a school project, Ramona and Jackson cannot use any tech devices for a day. This prompts Ramona and Kimmy to see who can last the longest going unplugged. Jackson and Ramona, who are dressed up as pioneers for the project, miss the bus and get lost since they don't have their cell phones. They end up away from school. Stephanie is on Max duty because he is sick, though he tries to sneak off to school to present a project. Things don't sit well with D.J. when the interviewer from the preschool suggests that Tommy should see a speech specialist and wait to enroll in the spring.
40	14	"Surrogate City"	Dave Coulier	Bryan Behar & Steve Baldikoski	December 22, 2017
Rocki is starting to influence Jackson as he changes his attitude and look by dying his hair blue. He does this because she makes fun of him for being a mama's boy. D.J. is not having it and confronts Gia about it. Stephanie and Jimmy look for a surrogate, and after several failed attempts, Gia is asked to be the surrogate, but declines. Ramona learns about her ancestry; Kimmy starts to embrace her newly discovered French heritage and Fernando also does with his Jewish heritage. Jackson moves outside to avoid living by D.J.'s rules. He admits his changes are not the real him, and he is only doing it because he has a crush on Rocki. D.J. wanted to be Stephanie's surrogate, but it would have been too risky for her, so she found someone else: Kimmy.
41	15	"Soul Sisters"	Phill Lewis	Boyd Hale	December 22, 2017
Kimmy breaks the news to Fernando about her being Stephanie's surrogate. She then decides to spend the day with Stephanie. Kimmy wants to do the stuff she can't do while pregnant. D.J. wants to spend the day doing nothing. The boys are being rough with each other, and when Max tries to throw a basketball at Jackson, it instead hits the Ancient Mariner that stood by the steps. The head breaks into pieces, and Jackson and Ramona try to glue it back together. Fernando buys Tommy a race car bed. D.J. changes her relationship status to "it's complicated." Later, Steve drops by to tell her that they can start dating soon. They embrace in a kiss but are interrupted by Matt. He came by to tell her that he is opening his own pet care clinic two doors down from hers and calling it "Harmon Better Petcare". When D.J. finds out that Max broke the Ancient Mariner, she is not mad and confesses that it's totally creepy.
42	16	"Happily Ever After"	Rich Correll	Maria Brown-Gallenberg & Jerry Collins	December 22, 2017
There are only two more days left until D.J. and Steve can start dating again. Kimmy gets the embryos implanted. Ramona is planning the homecoming dance, and Jackson wants to ask Rocki to the dance, while Kimmy has to plan a birthday party for Dakota, a demanding 10-year-old. All three ladies have to be the fairy godmothers at Dakota's party the next day. The homecoming dance is dead, so the dance team captain, Chad Brad Bradley, invites everyone to his house since his parents are away. To make Ramona feel better, Kimmy, D.J. and Stephanie come to the rescue. They use the decorations from Dakota's party to make the dance better. Everyone comes back to the dance, because the girls called the cops on Chad's party. They call Gia, so Girl Talk performs at the dance. Right at midnight, Steve shows up and kisses D.J. The two can start dating again.
43	17	"Fullers in a Fog"	Rich Correll	Eydie Faye & Kate Spurgeon	December 22, 2017
It's the 30th Anniversary of when Joey and Jesse moved in, so they and Danny are all coming to town to celebrate their "Dadiversary." D.J. is getting ready for her "third" first date with Steve. Jackson and Rocki start making out, only to be interrupted by Ramona. After having an ominous dream, Stephanie feels like the day is going to go badly and Kimmy will realize she's not pregnant. Things from her dream start happening, which worries her. Due to the fog being bad, D.J. and Steve can't drive to the restaurant for their date, so Joey suggests they have their date at the house. He has Becky, Jesse and Danny all help. Danny receives bad news: he and Becky have been replaced by Mario Lopez on Wake Up USA because they asked for too much money and they are out of a job. Joey also receives bad news: his wife got a job being a magician on a cruise ship for six months, so now he has to raise his four wild kids all alone. The bad news continues to spread to others, as Steve has been offered to be the foot specialist for the Lakers. Lastly, Kimmy thinks she's not pregnant, which saddens Stephanie. Special guest stars: John Stamos as Jesse Katsopolis, Dave Coulier as Joey Gladstone, Bob Saget as Danny Tanner, Lori Loughlin as Rebecca Donaldson-Katsopolis
44	18	"Here Comes the Sun"	Jeff Franklin	Jeff Franklin	December 22, 2017
Feeling sorry for themselves, Fernando motivates Danny, Jesse and Joey to cheer themselves up. Danny takes Becky down to the station to see if they can get their old jobs back at "Wake Up San Francisco." Lonzo Ball begs Steve to take the job with the Lakers, but Steve declines to be with D.J. The station calls and says that they only want Becky back so she can host a new woman's talk show called "The Gab." Jesse and Joey buy back the Smash Club (which is now a laundromat), and Jesse gets the idea to have the "Dadiversary" party there. Just when Danny thought the day couldn’t get any better, the girls tell Danny that they have a special mystery guest for him; his ex-fiancée, Vicky Larson. The two catch up, and he invites her to the party. D.J. tells Steve that she called the Lakers and told them that he's taking the job. Jesse, Becky, and Joey all announce that they are moving back to town. Danny then declares he's moving back home too and is taking his old room back. Kimmy gives Stephanie good news that she's pregnant. Special guest stars: John Stamos as Jesse Katsopolis, Dave Coulier as Joey Gladstone, Bob Saget as Danny Tanner, Lori Loughlin as Rebecca Donaldson-Katsopolis

=== Season 4 (2018) ===
No. overall	No. in season	Title	Directed by	Written by	Original release date
45	1	"Oh My Santa"	Rich Correll	Bryan Behar & Steve Baldikoski	December 14, 2018
It's Christmas time, and while D.J. takes the two younger boys to see Santa, the rest of the gang decorates the house. Trouble arises when D.J. returns though, as Tommy is apparently terrified of Santa and Max seems to have turned into a Grinch. The family later learns that Max has been hurting when he sees other children with their fathers as he misses his. D.J. helps him get over this by telling him how she felt after she lost her mom and by letting him and the family watch home videos of Tommy Sr. while Joey helps Tommy Jr. like Santa again. Special guest: Dave Coulier as Joey Gladstone
46	2	"Big Night"	Rich Correll	Amy Engelberg & Wendy Engelberg	December 14, 2018
D.J. and Steve officially begin dating as a couple. However, a traffic jam causes problems before they ever make it to dinner and both are worried about making the date too perfect. Elsewhere, Stephanie is worried about her baby too much and does not let Kimmy do anything fun. Kimmy turns the tables on her and Jimmy to get Stephanie to ease up. Jackson decides he wants a real relationship with Rocki, and Steve and D.J. are able to relax around each other and can enjoy themselves.
47	3	"A Sense of Purpose"	Linda Mendoza	Bob Keyes & Doug Keyes	December 14, 2018
Danny struggles with his retirement and is bothering the Tanner household. D.J. and Matt clash over their competing businesses, with Matt still reeling over their breakup. When Danny resolves their dispute, he realizes his purpose in life is mediating and interviewing, and he is able to get his old job back at Wake Up San Francisco, after an incident with Becky's co-host. Elsewhere, Jackson decides he wants to be good at something and discovers a talent for kicking footballs. Special guests: Bob Saget as Danny Tanner, Lori Loughlin as Rebecca Donaldson-Katsopolis
48	4	"Ghosted"	Mark Cendrowski	David A. Arnold	December 14, 2018
Stephanie tries to be a singer at children's parties to increase her income for her future family. Meanwhile, Ramona's new friends decide to ghost her at dinner and the movies, but Stephanie is able to teach them a lesson, helping her realize she will be a good mother. Kimmy and Fernando prompt a competition between D.J. and Steve, encouraging them to both give each other extravagant gifts for their two week anniversary.
49	5	"No Escape"	Lynn McCracken	Will Griffin	December 14, 2018
D.J. and Steve invite Matt to bring his new girlfriend to an escape room with them. However, it may be more than D.J. was expecting when Gia ends up being the girlfriend, causing D.J. to become competitive and hurt Steve. Meanwhile, Kimmy, Fernando, Stephanie, and Jimmy attend a Lamaze class and the two couples clash over who gets to practice in the class. Ramona and Jackson attend a rally for better school funding and Jackson takes Ramona's spotlight. Kimmy later tells Stephanie she doesn't want to give birth to the baby because then Stephanie won't like her anymore, but Stephanie tells her that they are friends. D.J. and Steve agree they are a better couple than Matt and Gia.
50	6	"Angels' Night Out"	Jody Margolin Hahn	Meg DeLoatch	December 14, 2018
The ladies attend a 70's cruise thinking it's a 70's theme cruise, but it ends up being a cruise for 70-year-olds. When some diamonds go missing, the girls decide to try out their Charlie's Angel's skills. Meanwhile at home, the boys try to prank Joey. Special guest: Dave Coulier as Joey Gladstone
51	7	"President Fuller"	Dave Coulier	John D. Beck & Ron Hart	December 14, 2018
After watching Max's "unboxing" videos, D.J. decides he should change his focus from videos to running for school president, but it could lead to a feud as his girlfriend Rose will be his opponent. When Rose makes a mean-spirited remark towards Max, he retaliates by starting a smear campaign against Rose. Meanwhile, D.J. tries to figure out how to rekindle her friendship with C.J. when both of them are still afraid to talk to each other. C.J. and Rose go to the house, where C.J. chews out D.J. for letting Max trash Rose. After Max and Rose apologize to each other, D.J. and C.J. finally talk and make amends. Meanwhile, Danny and Rebecca are annoyed with the puff pieces they have to do on Wake Up, San Francisco, so Danny tries to confront the producer, Karyn. The conversation ends with Danny having a colonoscopy on live television. Special guests: Bob Saget as Danny Tanner, Lori Loughlin as Rebecca Donaldson-Katsopolis
52	8	"Driving Mr. Jackson"	Rich Correll	Amy Engelberg & Wendy Engelberg	December 14, 2018
Ramona and Jackson attend their first high school party, but trouble ensues when Jackson gets drunk and calls Fernando for help. Meanwhile, D.J. and Matt begin having tension at work when everyone begins requesting Matt over her after he wins the vet of the year. Elsewhere, Becky and Jesse begin fighting after Jesse is accepted by the moms at Mommy and Me over Becky. Special guests: John Stamos as Jesse Katsopolis, Lori Loughlin as Rebecca Donaldson-Katsopolis
53	9	"Perfect Sons"	Candace Cameron Bure	Taylor Friedman	December 14, 2018
Max receives his first B and it affects his confidence when he appears on Wake Up San Francisco. Fernando's mom comes for a visit, and it's revealed that he never told her of his divorce from Kimmy. They lie to her, saying that Kimmy is carrying his baby and pretending that the Tanner/Fuller home is their home. Jackson is being taught how to drive by Steve, but they run into trouble when the car breaks down. Special guests: Bob Saget as Danny Tanner, Lori Loughlin as Rebecca Donaldson-Katsopolis
54	10	"Golden-Toe Fuller"	Rich Correll	Bob Keyes & Doug Keyes	December 14, 2018
Jackson is named the player of the week after kicking his team to the state semifinals, but as he feels the pressure he begins to limp. Elsewhere, Jesse attends his first daddy/daughter class and has to deal with hipster dads. All this occurs as D.J. is planning a gender reveal party for Stephanie even though Stephanie and Jimmy aren't sure they want to know the gender of their baby. Special guest: John Stamos as Jesse Katsopolis
55	11	"It's Always Open"	Kimberly McCullough	Nick Fascitelli	December 14, 2018
After a false alarm with Kimmy's pregnancy, D.J. tries to get Stephanie and Jimmy to address their relationship as she feels Jimmy isn't taking their impending parenthood seriously. Stephanie takes up dodgeball to take out her frustration instead of confronting what she needs from Jimmy. Meanwhile, Kimmy tries to set Ramona up on a date with her new intern, failing to realize he's gay. Guest Star: Miss Benny as Casey.
56	12	"The Prom"	Dave Coulier	Maria Brown-Gallenberg	December 14, 2018
Prom night has arrived and D.J. is excited to play head chaperone. Meanwhile, Jackson convinces a reluctant Rocki to be his date while Ramona and Casey go as friends. The prom soon turns sour, though, as Gia is also chaperoning, which irks D.J., Ramona sees Popko on a date with her rival, and Jackson gets caught insulting Rocki in front of his teammates. Back at home, Kimmy and Stephanie try to have a girls' night in but are interrupted by Joey and Fernando, who draft the ladies into judging their chili cook-off. Special guest: Dave Coulier as Joey Gladstone Guest Star: Miss Benny as Casey.
57	13	"Opening Night"	Christian Jensen	Bryan Behar & Steve Baldikoski	December 14, 2018
D.J. and Stephanie take Kimmy on a babymoon to see Hamilton but, just as the show starts, Kimmy goes into labor. Meanwhile, Jimmy and Fernando go on a quest for a sandwich and Max decides to tag along. When Jimmy starts having doubts about fatherhood, Fernando and Max give him a pep talk. Back at home, Jackson deals with the fallout from prom night when Rocki breaks up with him, but the matter is complicated when Rocki has to give Jackson and Ramona a ride to the hospital. In the end, Kimmy gives birth to a baby girl and Jimmy proposes to Stephanie, who happily accepts. While Jackson and Rocki are waiting with Ramona and Max for the baby, they begin to reconcile with each other.

=== Season 5 (2019–20) ===
No. overall	No. in season	Title	Directed by	Written by	Original release date
Part 1
58	1	"Welcome Home, Baby-to-Be-Named-Later"	Rich Correll	Bryan Behar & Steve Baldikoski	December 6, 2019
Stephanie and Jimmy bring the baby and a doula back home. Stephanie wants to bond with the baby to get a feel on what to name her but the doula is hogging her. With the doula starts to get on her nerves, D.J. spies on her and Kimmy misses being pregnant. Stephanie finally comes up with a name; Danielle "Dani" Jo (named after her dad and D.J.). Special guest star: Bob Saget as Danny Tanner
59	2	"Hale's Kitchen"	Rich Correll	Linda Videtti Figueiredo	December 6, 2019
Steve takes D.J. to a cooking class where they compete with another couple. Max is sad when Stephanie can't take him to the Renaissance Festival because of her being busy with the baby. Stephanie makes it up to him by bringing the fair to their backyard. Ramona falls for the Postmates delivery boy, Ethan, which makes Fernando protective of her.
60	3	"Family Business"	Rich Correll	Bob Keyes & Doug Keyes	December 6, 2019
Fernando is depressed since his racing career is over, and Jimmy spends time away with his freelance photography. D.J. asks Steve to take Fernando and Jimmy out to lunch. When the owner of their favorite sandwich shop announces that he is closing his shop, the guys buy it from him. Max has fear over the high dive.
61	4	"Moms' Night Out"	Christian Jensen	Amy Engelberg & Wendy Engelberg	December 6, 2019
While Gia joins the "She-Wolf Pack" for a night out at Club Euphoria (as previously seen in "Funner House"), the men decide to have their own night out at the house. With her mom now married to Matt, Rocki struggles to adjust with her new but also third step-father and turns to Jackson for help with how to cope with it. In the end, Rocki admits to Matt that unlike her other two step-fathers, she finally feels connected with him while embracing him as her new father and telling Jackson that since he helped her, they both deserve another chance at their relationship.
62	5	"Ready Player Fuller"	Dave Coulier	Maria Brown-Gallenberg	December 6, 2019
D.J. doesn't know what's going on in Jackson's life since he doesn't communicate with her. She tries to pick up one of his interests by playing the same game as him. Jackson joins his mom's game unbeknownst to him that she is "DoomBuggy". Fernando accidentally puts down the wrong date for the grand re-opening of Uncle Monty's, and it opens a week earlier than it should. There's a line outside the door due to them offering a Groupon where the prices are rolled back to the original prices. D.J. has to reveal herself as "DoomBuggy" when she and Jackson make the Rocket League NorCal finals.
63	6	"The Mayor's Bird"	Rich Correll	John D. Beck & Ron Hart	December 6, 2019
Steve and D.J.'s date night is interrupted when Matt comes in telling D.J. that they have to go and clip the Mayor's hornbill's wings. Before Ramona heads out the door with Ethan, her mom yells Gibbler game night, wanting her and Ethan to stay in for the night. With their backs turned Horatio flies out to the balcony. Matt goes to tranquilize the bird but D.J. knocks down the gun, shooting Matt in the foot. Stephanie tries to figure out what to do with her life.
64	7	"DJ's Amazing 40th Birthday Race"	Mark Cendrowski	David A. Arnold	December 6, 2019
It's D.J.'s 40th birthday and Steve plans an Amazing Race for her birthday. The teams are D.J., Stephanie and Kimmy versus Matt, Jimmy, and Fernando. Steve says that he has a surprise for her at the end that will make her love him forever. Kimmy and Stephanie think that he will propose and some of the clues make it sound like he will propose, which convinces D.J.
65	8	"Five Dates with Kimmy Gibbler"	Candace Cameron Bure	Will Griffin	December 6, 2019
Feeling that she needs to be sure Fernando is "the one" for her, Kimmy decides to go on a couple of dates in order to test the theory. Back at the house, Ramona invites her boyfriend Ethan over but when he sees Rocki, both begin acting strange around each other...leaving Jackson, Max, Steve, and Ramona suspicious of what they are hiding. Meanwhile Lisa Loeb stops by the pet clinic to have her cat examined and D.J. wants her to meet Stephanie and have her listen to her latest song. Special Guest Star: Kirk Cameron as Himself
66	9	"A Modest Proposal"	Rich Correll	Nick Fascitelli	December 6, 2019
Fernando asks D.J. to help him find a way to propose to Kimmy. This was a diversion to keep D.J. distracted from what Steve had planned. Steve proposes to D.J. and Kimmy proposes to Fernando. With all of them getting married, the girls come up with the idea to have a triple wedding. Special guest stars: Bob Saget as Danny Tanner, John Stamos as Jesse Katsopolis, Dave Coulier as Joey Gladstone
Part 2
67	10	"If the Suit Fits"	Rich Correll	Bryan Behar & Steve Baldikoski	June 2, 2020
As Steve moves into the house, D.J. goes through her closet to make room for him and finds Tommy Sr.'s suit. Jackson walks in and thinks his mother is giving it away, upsetting him. Joey shows up to throw an engagement dinner for the newly engaged couples. He also invites Mr. and Mrs. Gibbler, causing Stephanie and Fernando to practice with Kimmy and Jimmy pretending to be their parents. In the end, their parents don't show up, upsetting Kimmy as she planned to ask her father to walk her down the aisle. Joey offers to do so in his place. Special guest star: Dave Coulier as Joey Gladstone
68	11	"Three Weddings and a Musical"	Lynn McCracken	Taylor Friedman	June 2, 2020
As the ladies and Fernando head to a wedding expo, Steve stays behind to babysit Dani, Tommy, and Max. Ramona and Jackson try out for the school play, with Jackson getting the lead that Ramona wanted. Steve beats Max at chess which surprises Max. At the expo, the women realize they all have different ideas for their wedding and get into an argument. They end up modeling dresses to get a discount on wedding dresses.
69	12	"Cold Turkey"	Dave Coulier	Katie Gault	June 2, 2020
Danny, Joey, and Jesse return for Thanksgiving dinner that is being made by Stephanie. Instead of using the family cook book, Stephanie looks up recipes online so D.J. decides to go rogue. Her and the boys make some food upstairs. Stephanie sends Danny, Joey, and Jesse to get the turkey and they accidentally get locked up in the meat locker at the deli, where some old truths are revealed. Stephanie later accidentally backs Joey's car into the kitchen, similarly to what she had done when she was younger. Special guest stars: Bob Saget as Danny Tanner, John Stamos as Jesse Katsopolis, Dave Coulier as Joey Gladstone
70	13	"College Tours"	Jody Margolin Hahn	Andrea Barber	June 2, 2020
After Jackson fixes Ramona's computer, Kimmy learns that Ramona was looking into colleges on the East Coast. When Jackson is reluctant to go to college, D.J. and Kimmy take Jackson and Ramona on a college tour at D.J.'s alma mater, California University. As Stephanie had no desire to join them, she decides to spend the day relaxing. Needing the guys gone, she then sends them to go looking for tuxes. At the college, their tour guide informs D.J. that her sorority is no longer the popular one on campus ever since the rival sorority stole the Bronze Cap. In the interest of fixing her sorority, D.J. makes it a mission to steal it back. Jackson shares his tech knowledge when he helps his mother escape with the cap in a room that is full of lasers. After needing another opinion on their tuxes, the guys get Max to join them. Max ends up insulting the store owner and causing problems so Stephanie is called to fix it.
71	14	"Basic Training"	Candace Cameron Bure	Story by : David A. Arnold; Teleplay by : Amy Engelberg & Wendy Engelberg	June 2, 2020
Max is allowed to skip a grade, causing him to go to middle school. After one day of wearing his normal clothing, he changes his style to be more like other kids. He also starts acting differently, surprising D.J.. He reveals that kids were making fun of him on the way he dresses. Ramona trains to beat the reigning champion Berkowitz at eating sandwiches at Uncle Monty's. When Ramona's boyfriend shows up, she grows nervous so Stephanie gives her a pep talk. Ramona ends up winning by one sandwich.
72	15	"Be Yourself, Free Yourself"	Rich Correll	Story by : Nick Fascitelli & Will Griffin; Teleplay by : Bob Keyes & Doug Keyes	June 2, 2020
It's flea dip week at the clinic, thus causing a surplus in visitors. Kimmy fills in for the receptionist and gets on everyone’s nerves, especially Matt. Jesse—determined to find out who bit Pamela at school—hosts a play date at the Tanner-Fuller house. It is revealed that Becky is taking care of her mother in Nebraska. Special guest star: John Stamos as Jesse Katsopolis
73	16	"The Nearlywed Game"	Jodie Sweetin	Story by : Jeff Silverstein; Teleplay by : Maria Brown-Gallenberg & Linda Videtti Figueiredo	June 2, 2020
The kids have the engaged couples play The Nearlywed Game (a television game show based on The Newlywed Game) to see which couples knows each other best. Max hosts it while the game is being live streamed.
74	17	"Something Borrowed"	Rich Correll	Story by : Beth Crudele; Teleplay by : John D. Beck & Ron Hart	June 2, 2020
The girls go into the attic to find something borrowed to wear in their wedding. Stephanie decides to wear her late mother’s veil. Kimmy and Fernando, along with Stephanie and Jimmy, announce they will be moving out after the wedding. Jackson pretends to be sick so Ramona can play the lead in the school play before she moves away. Stephanie realizes she cannot recall memories of her mother when Jimmy asks her what her favorite memory is. Stephanie reveals to D.J. that she feels she is losing her connection to her mother. D.J. takes her to the diner where their mother used to take them, and she regains memories of her.
75	18	"Our Very Last Show, Again"	Rich Correll	Bryan Behar & Steve Baldikoski	June 2, 2020
After the rehearsal dinner, Jimmy begs the guys to leave before midnight as it is believed to be bad luck to see the bride the day of the wedding. As midnight strikes, the clan becomes paranoid. D.J. assures Jimmy there will be no curse and not to worry. Upon arriving to the wedding venue the next day, the girls learn it has been seized by the government. They decide to have the wedding at home. Bad luck continues when the minister must cater only to high-profile guests. Danny and Joey search for other officiants, including Gia, Matt, Larry (the father of Taylor, Max’s best friend and enemy) who also has a crush on D.J., and Derek (Michelle’s childhood friend). As Jackson’s ex-girlfriend Lola shows up, Rocki becomes upset when Jackson doesn’t introduce her as his girlfriend. As Ramona scoffs at Jackson, her ex-boyfriend Popko shows up. Panicked, Ramona fails to introduce Popko to her boyfriend, Ethan. Jackson reconciles with Rocki and tells her he is in love with her. Rocki tells Jackson that she is in love with him too and they kiss. As the wedding approaches, wedding guests appear, including Matt, Gia, C.J. and Rose, Duane, Viper, and Vicky, who is still friends with Danny. The girls are shocked upon learning Danny was able to get Joey McIntyre to officiate the wedding. As Stephanie, Jimmy, Dani, Kimmy, Fernando, and Ramona all prepare to move out, they ask D.J. if they can all stay (to which she happily approves). Stephanie reveals she is pregnant. Special guest stars: John Stamos as Jesse Katsopolis, Bob Saget as Danny Tanner, Dave Coulier as Joey Gladstone
