= Head over Heels (American TV series) =

1997 American TV series

- Promotional image
- Genre: Sitcom
- Created by: Jeff Franklin
- Starring: Peter Dobson; Mitchell Whitfield; Eva LaRue; Cindy Ambuehl; Patrick Bristow
- Composers: Paul Buckley; Jonathan Wolff
- Country of origin: United States
- Original language: English
- No. of seasons: 1
- No. of episodes: 8

Production
- Executive producer: Jeff Franklin
- Producers: Pamela Putch; Andrew Gottlieb; Vince Cheung and Ben Montanio
- Production locations: Los Angeles, California
- Camera setup: Multi-camera
- Running time: 30 minutes
- Production companies: Jeff Franklin Productions; Columbia TriStar Television

Original release
- Network: UPN
- Release: August 26 – October 28, 1997

Head over Heels is an American television sitcom created by Jeff Franklin that aired on UPN from August 26 to October 28, 1997. It is set in the eponymous video dating agency based in Miami Beach, Florida, run by brothers Jack and Warren Baldwin (played by Peter Dobson and Mitchell Whitfield, respectively). The remainder of the cast consists of their employees, played by Eva LaRue, Patrick Bristow, and Cindy Ambuehl. Connie Stevens was initially cast as the Baldwins' mother, but never appeared in the show after the pilot was rewritten. Andrew Gottlieb was a co-producer, and Vince Cheung and Ben Montanio were consulting producers.

The sitcom was the lowest-performing series tracked by Nielsen Holdings for the 1997–1998 television season. Since UPN primarily marketed its programming to African American audiences, critics questioned the show's lack of a black main character. With its inclusion of Ian, Head over Heels was one of 30 U.S. programs to feature a gay, lesbian or bisexual character that television season. It received a negative response from commentators, who criticized its sex comedy and characters.

== Premise and characters ==
Set in Miami Beach, the series is about the Head over Heels video dating agency, operated by brothers Jack and Warren Baldwin (Peter Dobson and Mitchell Whitfield, respectively). Portrayed as opposites of one another, Warren is more involved in managing the agency than Jack. While Jack dates female clients, Warren still loves his estranged wife, who had an affair with a professional football player.

The rest of the staff includes two romance counselors: Carmen (Eva LaRue) and Ian (Patrick Bristow). A self-identified feminist, Carmen is a PhD student studying human behavior and sexuality. The bisexual, celibate Ian is frequently questioned about his sexuality, and former stripper Valentina (Cindy Ambuehl) is a receptionist who is knowledgeable about computers. Karen Dior and Bernie Kopell guest starred in the series as themselves. Jim Lange, who Jack had idolized since childhood, also appears in an episode as himself.

Head over Heels often relies on sex comedy, leading The Washington Post's Tom Shales to describe it as a "smutcom". Alan Frutkin of The Advocate compared the show to the sitcoms Friends and Married... with Children. The pilot episode features Warren having sex with a client in his office despite the agency's dating policy, and a bikini fashion show. Storylines in other episodes include Jack using Cap'n Crunch as an alias in chat rooms to seduce women and Valentina saying she would open the mail topless for $1,000 a week.

== Production ==
Montrose Productions produced Head over Heels in association with Jeff Franklin Productions and Columbia TriStar Television. Jeff Franklin was the show's creator and executive producer. Referring to Franklin's work on the sitcom Full House, Dusty Saunders of the Rocky Mountain News wrote: "I still wonder if Franklin isn't ridding himself of a lot of sexual TV frustration, after all those years with fictional giddy family members." Andrew Gottlieb co-produced the series, and Vince Cheung and Ben Montanio were consulting producers. Despite being set in Miami Beach, Head over Heels was filmed in Los Angeles. Matthew Diamond directed three episodes, and Amanda Bearse and Asaad Kelada did one episode apiece. Jonathan Wolf and Paul Buckley composed the series's music.

During production, Connie Stevens was set to play the Baldwins' mother in a recurring role. A writer for Turner Classic Movies described the show as "resurrect[ing] [Stevens's] acting career". Although United Paramount Network (UPN) had ordered Head over Heels due to Stevens, the network removed her from the project following what it described as "a creative change". In the series's original pilot episode, the mother is the dating agency's original owner who passes it on to her sons. A "cavorting bimbo of a mother", she has a relationship with a Hispanic personal trainer and frequently talks about having sex with him. References to the dating company's history and the Baldwins' involvement were removed from the series. For the second version of the pilot, LaRue was added to the show after her character (Maria Santos) was removed from the soap opera All My Children.

== Episodes ==
No.	Title	Directed by	Written by	Original release date	US viewers (millions)
1	"One Down"	Matthew Diamond	Jeff Franklin	August 26, 1997	2.99
Although Warren Baldwin institutes a policy banning Head over Heels employees from dating clients, he is unable to adhere to it himself.
2	"Gigolo Guy"	Matthew Diamond	Jon Ross	September 2, 1997	3.13
Jack Baldwin is targeted by a photo-studio owner, and Ian's macho brother visits the agency.
3	"Game Show Guy"	Amanda Bearse	Mark LaVine & Eddie Ring	September 9, 1997	2.71
Warren hosts a game show based on the dating service.
4	"Vice Guy"	Paul Kreppel	Fran Kaufer	September 16, 1997	2.56
Jack encourages his employees to give up their vices for a week.
5	"Witness Guy"	Matthew Diamond	Andrew Gottlieb	September 23, 1997	2.92
The agency works with a client who is in the witness protection program.
6	"Hot Guy"	Paul Kreppel	Dean Young	September 30, 1997	3.22
Valentina and Carmen fight over an attractive client.
7	"Spider Guy"	Asaad Kelada	Chris Brown	October 14, 1997	2.77
When Warren is hospitalized, Jack is in charge of the agency. His employees are concerned about his unorthodox business practices, including recruiting clients from a retirement home.
8	"Reunion Guy"	Mark K. Samuels	Bob Perlow & Mike Borassi	October 28, 1997	2.89
At their high-school reunion, Warren and Jack try to impress their former classmates by proving that they are successful and desirable.

== Broadcast history ==
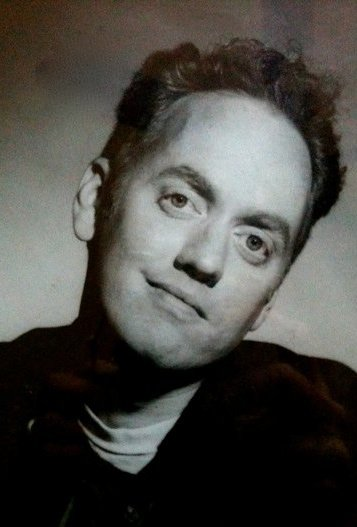
Patrick Bristow plays a bisexual man on Head over Heels, one of 30 U.S. shows in the 1997–1998 television season with an LBGT character.

UPN ordered three new sitcoms for the 1997–1998 television season: Head over Heels, Hitz, and Good News. They were part of the network's decision to expand its prime-time schedule to four nights a week. Although UPN targeted its programming at African-American audiences, Head over Heels does not feature a black actor. Network president Dean Valentine denied accusations from "industry observers" that he was "abandoning the black audience or turning down projects featuring black stars and producers".

Head over Heels was one of 30 U.S. programs that season to feature a gay, lesbian or bisexual character through its inclusion of Ian. About the character's sexuality, Patrick Bristow said he has "a rich, rich and spotted past". Sociologist Suzanna Danuta Walters wrote that Ian and Josh Nicolé Blair (in the sitcom Veronica's Closet) represented a trend in which "homosexuality is a running gag", and characters were in denial about their sexuality.

Airing after Hitz, Head over Heels was broadcast on Tuesdays at 9:30 pm EST; it was originally scheduled for 8:30 pm. The series had a TV-PG parental rating for suggestive language and sexual situations; the Deseret News's Scott Pierce felt that it should have received a TV-14 rating for its sexual content. The series attracted a weekly average of 2.3 million viewers. It tied with Alright Already as the lowest-performing show (tracked by Nielsen Holdings) of the season. The overall viewing figures for both shows was 2.7 million viewers.

Head over Heels was the first casualty of the 1997–1998 season. Although 13 episodes were ordered, only eight were broadcast. Despite reports that the series would air through November, its final episode was shown on October 28, 1997. Dobson and Whitfield appeared in all eight episodes, Bristow appeared in seven, and Ambuehl and LaRue appeared in four.

== Critical reception ==
The series received negative reviews from television critics; according to E! News's Joal Ryan, it was known as the "Worst New Show of the Season" during its debut. Criticism was primarily directed at its sexual humor, such as a Deseret News writer criticizing its "tasteless, vulgar jokes about sexual performance, orgasms and bodily functions". Citing it as one of the season's worst half-hour shows, the Rocky Mountain News's Dusty Saunders described Head over Heels as an unsuccessful attempt to emulate Friends. Howard Rosenberg of the Los Angeles Times dismissed the show as "the mother of all asinine sitcoms [and] a show with as much weight as a G-string". Head over Heels did receive some positive remarks. Despite calling the show a miss for UPN, Tom Shales wrote that its humor was not as "ugly and vicious" as the sitcom Hitz; he also praised Patrick Bristow's scene stealer and Valentina's technological aptitude as "a cute touch". The opening titles received praise from Adam Sandler of Variety, who described it as "stylish and provocative" and comparable to those for the crime drama Silk Stalkings.

Critics disliked the show's characters and called the female characterizations sexist. David Zurawik of The Baltimore Sun singled out Valentina and the Baldwins' mother as examples of the series's poor representation of women. He was critical of the sexualization of Valentina, and the fact that the Baldwins' mother is defined through her relationship to her boyfriend. Sandler and the Los Angeles Daily News's Keith Marder felt that the show's characters relied on clichés. Marder summed up the series as "a mess of ridiculous caricatures and poor taste".
