= Ramona Parra Brigade =

- Brigada Ramona Parra
- Founded: 1968
- Ideology: Marxism-Leninism
- Part of: Communist Party of Chile

Ramona Parra Brigade (Spanish: Brigada Ramona Parra; or BRP) is the muralist brigade of the Communist Party of Chile (PCCh). It is named after Ramona Parra, a member of that party who was murdered in the Plaza Bulnes massacre in Santiago on January 28, 1946. It was created in 1968 by resolution of the VI Congress of Communist Youth of Chile (JJ.CC.).

Its first murals were created after a proposal by Pablo Neruda of Popular Unity (Chile). Later, its murals spread nationwide after Salvador Allende was named candidate for the 1970 Chilean presidential election. Their first murals were very simple, with irregular layouts using only one color and no background.

The goal of BRP muralists was to deliver meaningful messages to ordinary passersby. As a result of this, two characteristic aspects were developed: locating their murals in strategic areas, such as emblematic squares or marginal communes; and distinct iconography, such as the spike, the fist, the star, the birds and the workers.

In 1971 the artist Roberto Matta and the Ramona Parra Brigade, painted a mural called The first goal of the Chilean people, which is located in the old municipal swimming pool of the commune of La Granja. This mural has dimensions of 25 m long and 4 m high. It was covered in paint after the 1973 Chilean coup d'état, and was rediscovered in 2005 by thesis students from the University of Chile. After a long restoration (and fundraising) process, it was completed in September 2008.

Because some of its members were exiled abroad after the 1973 coup, there are several murals painted by the BRP abroad, including murals made in Amsterdam. In October 2018, one mural was discovered during the demolition of a building in the Osdorpplein neighborhood, which dates back to 1983 and refers to the dictatorial era of Chile. Valdivian artist Jorge "Kata" Nuñez claims there were around 60 murals painted in the city by members of the Ramona Parra Brigade.
