= Necessity (tort) =

In tort common law, the defense of necessity gives the state or an individual a privilege to take or use the property of another. A defendant typically invokes the defense of necessity only against the intentional torts of trespass to chattels, trespass to land, or conversion. The Latin phrase from common law is necessitas inducit privilegium quod jura privata ("Necessity induces a privilege because of a private right"). A court will grant this privilege to a trespasser when the risk of harm to an individual or society is apparently and reasonably greater than the harm to the property. Unlike the privilege of self-defense, those who are harmed by individuals invoking the necessity privilege are usually free from any wrongdoing. Generally, an individual invoking this privilege is obligated to pay any actual damages caused in the use of the property but not punitive or nominal damages.

== Private necessity ==
Private necessity is the use of another's property for private reasons. Well established doctrines in common law prevent a property owner from using force against an individual in a situation where the privilege of necessity would apply. While an individual may have a private necessity to use the land or property of another, that individual must compensate the owner for any damages caused. For example:

A strong wind blows a parachuting skydiver off course from his intended landing zone. He must land in a nearby farmer's field. The skydiver tramples on the farmer's prized roses, and the farmer hits the skydiver on the head with a pitchfork. The skydiver can invoke the privilege of private necessity for trespassing in the farmer's fields but will have to pay for the damage caused to the roses. The farmer will be liable for battery because the use of force in defense of property is not privileged against an individual who successfully claims private necessity.

In American law, the case most often cited to explain the privilege of private necessity is Vincent v. Lake Erie Transp. Co., 109 Minn. 456, 124 N.W. 221 (1910).

=== Vincent v. Lake Erie Transportation Co. ===
Facts
Defendant Lake Erie was at the dock of plaintiff Vincent to unload cargo from Reynolds, the steamship owned by the defendant. An unusually violent storm developed. Lake Erie was unable to leave the dock safely and deckhands for the steamship instead tied the Reynolds to the dock, continually changing ropes as they began to wear and break. A sudden fierce wind threw the ship against the dock significantly damaging the dock.
Issue
Is compensation required when there is damage to another's property due to a private necessity?
Decision
(Judge O'Brien) Yes. A private necessity may require one to take or damage another's property, but compensation is required. If the Reynolds had entered the harbor at the time the storm began, and the wind knocked her against the dock, this force of nature would not have allowed Vincent to recover. The defendant, Lake Erie, deliberately kept the Reynolds tied to the dock. If they had not done so, the ship could have been lost creating a far greater damage than what was caused to the dock. Although this was a prudent thing to do, Lake Erie is still liable to Vincent for the damage caused.
Dissent
(Judge Lewis) One who constructs a dock and conducts business assumes a risk of damage that may occur from storms. For this reason, Judge Lewis did not agree with the majority and believed that Vincent had assumed the risk of damage caused by Lake Erie

To invoke the private necessity privilege, the defendant must have been actually threatened or have reasonably thought that a significant harm were about to occur. The ruling in Vincent v. Lake Erie assures private citizens from a public policy standpoint that they will be compensated for their loss. Vincent will be compensated for repairs and Lake Erie can rest assured that their ship will not sink.

== Public necessity ==
Public necessity is the use of private property by a public official for a public reason. The potential harm to society necessitates the destruction or use of private property for the greater good. The injured, private individual does not always recover for the damage caused by the necessity. In American law, two conflicting cases illustrate this point: Surocco v. Geary, 3 Cal. 69 (1853) and Wegner v. Milwaukee Mutual Ins. Co. 479 N.W.2d 38 (Minn 1991).

=== Surocco v. Geary ===
Facts
San Francisco was hit by a major fire. The plaintiff, Surocco, was attempting to remove goods from his home while the fire raged nearby. The defendant and mayor of San Francisco, Geary, authorized that the plaintiff's home be demolished to stop the progress of the fire and to prevent its spread to nearby buildings. Surocco sued the mayor claiming he could have recovered more of his possessions had his house not been blown up.
Issue
Is a person liable for the private property of another if destroying that property would prevent an imminent public disaster?
Decision
No. The right of necessity falls under natural law and exists independent of society and government. Individual rights must give way to the higher law of impending necessity. A house on fire or about to catch on fire is a public nuisance which is lawful to abate. Otherwise one stubborn person could destroy an entire city. If property is destroyed without an apparent necessity, the destroying person would be liable to the property owner for trespass. Here, blowing up Surocco's house was necessary to stop the fire. Any delay in blowing up the house to allow him to remove more of his possessions would have made blowing up the house too late.

The decision in Surocco v. Geary differs from the private necessity doctrine that a trespasser must compensate a property owner for any damage she may cause.

=== Wegner v. Milwaukee Mutual Ins. Co. ===
This case coincides with the private necessity doctrine and shows that American courts are conflicted on the issue of compensation for damage.

Facts
A suspected felon barricaded himself inside of plaintiff Wegner's house. The Minneapolis police department fired tear gas canisters and concussion grenades into the house causing extensive damage. Wegner sued the defendant, the City of Minneapolis for trespass. Wegner claimed that the City's actions constituted a "taking" of his property under principles similar to those outlined in the Fifth Amendment to the US Constitution: this was a taking of his private property for public use and so the City was required to compensate him for it. The City claimed there was no taking because the police's actions were a legitimate exercise of police power. Lower courts ruled that the City was justified under the doctrine of public necessity and that the City was not required to compensate Wegner. Wegner appealed to the State Supreme Court in its claim against the City's insurance company.
Issue
Must a city compensate a homeowner whose property was damaged in the apprehension by police of a suspect?
Decision
(Judge Tomljanovich) Yes. Under Minnesota's constitution, the government must compensate a landowner for any damage it causes when it takes private land for public use. Whether the police acted reasonably is not relevant. The constitutional provision is not limited to an improvement of property for public use. The doctrine of public necessity does not change our holding. Once a taking has been found to exist, compensation is required. If the public necessity doctrine were to apply to a situation like this, no taking would ever be found. Fairness and justice require this result. It would not be fair for Wegner to suffer the burden of his loss for the public good. Therefore, the City must bear his loss. In addition, the individual police officers are not personally liable; the public must bear the loss.

It is an issue of public policy to determine if either private individuals or the public at large through taxes should bear the loss for damages caused through public necessity. Wegner v. Milwaukee allocates the loss that benefits the public to the public rather than to Wegner, the innocent citizen. Cases with similar facts to Wegner (e.g. Lech v. City of Greenwood Village) have used the public necessity doctrine under Surocco, and the individual must bear the cost of the greater public good. Courts determine this issue as a matter of public policy.

== See also ==
- Tort
- Common law
- Trespass to chattels
- Trespass to land
- Conversion
- Necessity (criminal law)
- Necessity in English criminal law
