= Soni Bringas =

American actress

- Born: Soni Nicole Bringas
- Occupation: Actress
- Years active: 2014–present

Soni Nicole Bringas is an American actress. She is best known for playing Ramona Gibbler in the sitcom Fuller House.

== Early life ==
Harris was born in Portland, Oregon. Her mother is from Barcelona while her father is from Montevideo. She attended New York University and graduated with a Bachelor of Arts in psychology and a minor in Child and Adolescent Mental Health Studies.

== Career ==
Bringas made her acting debut in an episode of the sitcom Jane the Virgin. Her first big role came playing Ramona Gibbler in the sitcom Fuller House. She is currently shooting for the crime drama film Path to Midnight and the comedy drama film Venice Days.

== Personal life ==
Bringas started dancing at age three and appeared on YouTube featuring in dance videos for popular choreographers such as Matt Steffanina, Kenny Wormald and Hollywood.

== Filmography ==
=== Film ===
Year	Title	Role	Notes
2023	How to Win Friends and Disappear People	Nancy	
2023	Disco Inferno	Mel	Short film
2025	Path to Midnight	Jessica Reynolds	
2026	Venice Days	Tammy	

=== Television ===
Year	Title	Role	Notes
2014	Jane the Virgin	Hip Hop Dancer	Episode: "Chapter Seven"
2015	Beautiful & Twisted	Young May	Television film
2015	Instant Mom	Max Weaver	Episode: "Bawamo Shazam"
2016–2020	Fuller House	Ramona Gibbler	Main role
2020	Minutiae	Libby	2 episodes
