= Ramona High School =

Ramona High School may refer to:

- Ramona High School (Riverside, California)
- Ramona High School (Ramona, California)
