= Ramona (band) =

Mexican psychedelic rock band

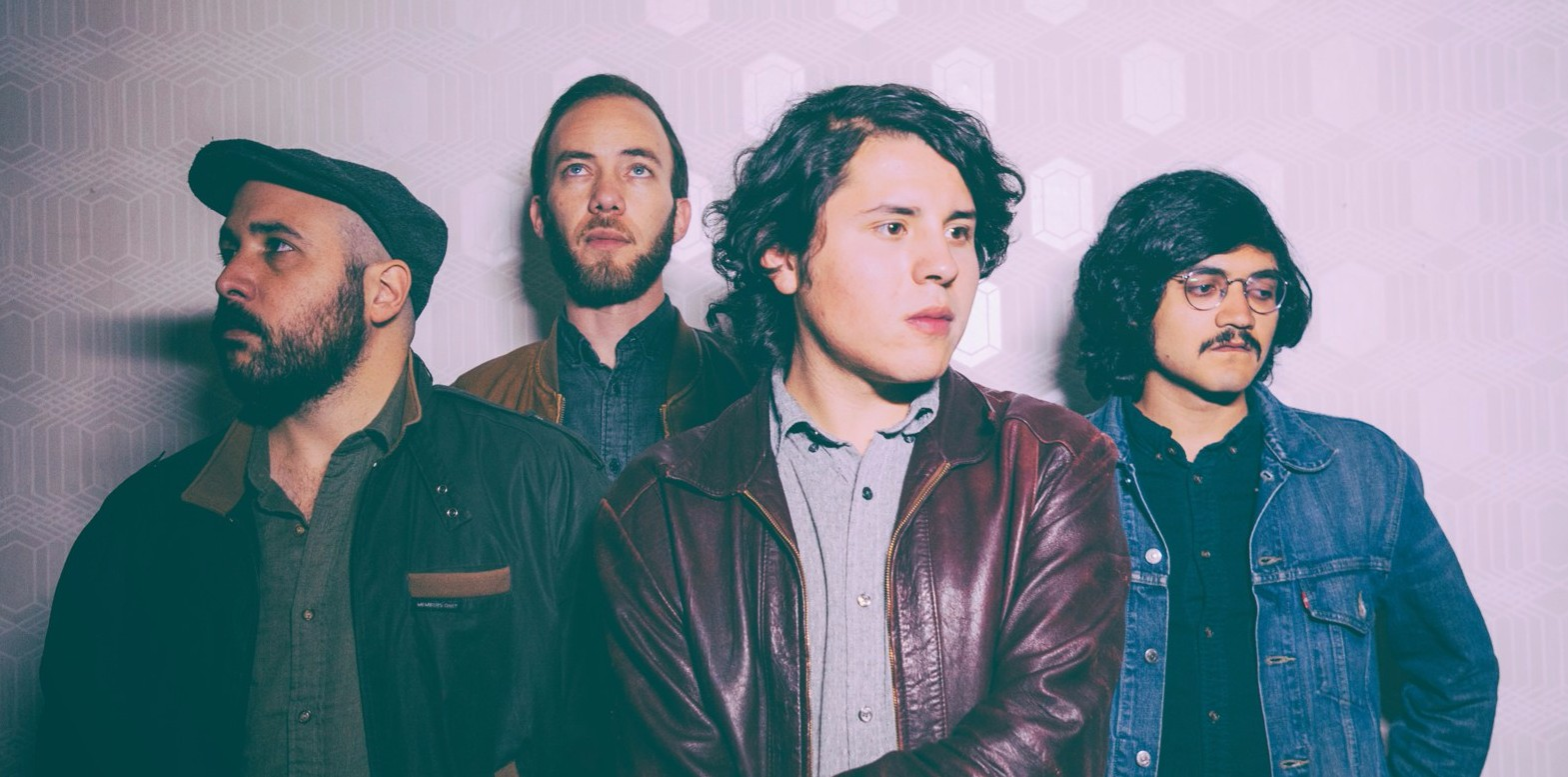
- Ramona in 2017

Background information
- Origin: Tijuana, Baja California, Mexico
- Genres: Psychedelic, indie, pop, alternative, synth, and acid rock
- Years active: 2011–present
- Members: As of May 2025: Jesús "Chuy" Guerrero; Omar Córdoba; Edgar Moreno; Dany Esquivel; Eli Ponce; Luis Reyes
- Past members: Mauricio Villicaña (fl. 2011–2022); Sergio Méndez (fl. 2019)
- Website: www.instagram.com/ramonamusica?igsh=N3R3ejNlMG5laG4x

Ramona is a Mexican psychedelic rock band from Tijuana, Baja California. Originally producing indie rock, Ramona developed its distinct mix by 2019, influenced by various artists and genres from the United States, Mexico, and Argentina.

== History ==
In 2011, the band was formed in Tijuana by lead vocalist Jesús "Chuy" Guerrero, drummer Omar Córdoba, and other brief members. Following the release of their first EP Vamos a viajar (2011), Guerrero and Córdoba recruited guitarist Mauricio Villicaña and bassist Edgar Moreno. They named themselves after Ramona Flowers from Scott Pilgrim vs. the World and Ramón Ayala in 2012 and began recording the indie rock album La Segunda Luz del Día (2015). Through their producer Alejandro Jiménez, it was picked up by Carla Morrison and her company Pan Dulce Productions. Their influences by 2014 included Luis Alberto Spinetta, Fleet Foxes, The Beatles, Françoise Hardy, Bon Iver, and The Morning Benders.

They produced their second album Cérès (2017) with Sierra León, whose members Seiji and Kenji Hino also recorded instrumentals for Ramona's Párpados (2018). The latter album marked the band's transition to psychedelic rock, with Guerrero noting the influence of King Gizzard, Boogarins, and Gaspar Peralta as well as Argentine musicians like Luca Bocci, Perras On The Beach, and Gustavo Santaolalla. He explained the Argentine connection from the relationship they developed with Tweety González at a gig in Guadalajara. Around this time, they had moved to Mexico City and opened for artists like Natalia Lafourcade, Kinky, Hello Seahorse!, and Enjambre. However, general difficulty adapting and the COVID-19 pandemic prompted them to return to Tijuana. By 2019, Romana developed its distinctive mix of psychedelic rock, bolero, and folk music.

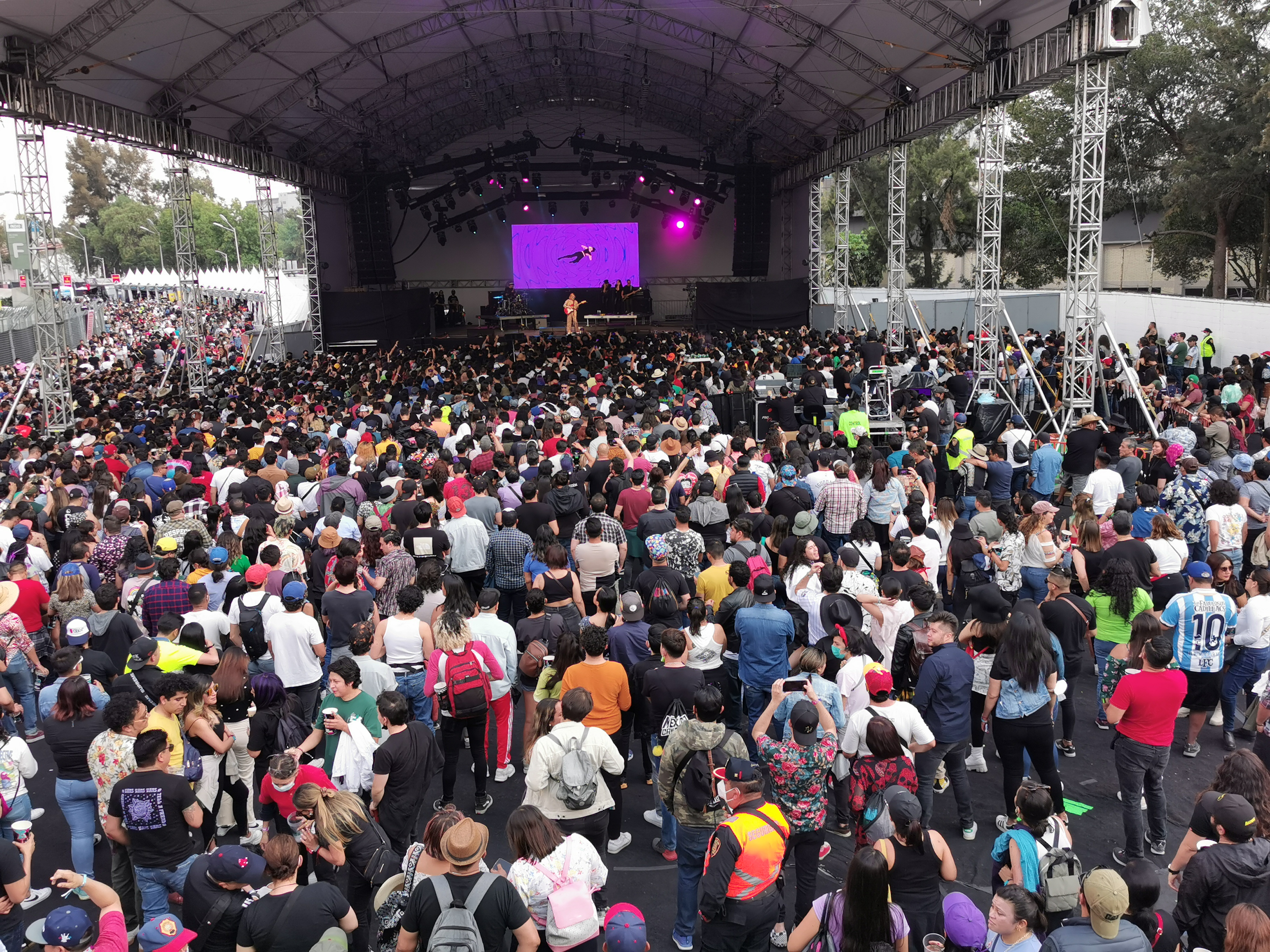
Crowd at Vanessa Zamora's performance at Vive Latino 2022

In 2021, they released Redes Sociales, which featured artists Gianna Sotera and Bandalos Chinos. In 2022, a live album with Little Jesus, Daniel Dennis, and Luca Bocci on Spotify. The same year they performed at Vive Latino, a longtime goal and an event in which only Guerrero had attended to see Chicano Batman in 2019. In 2024, they released Los himnos del amor, which Córdoba stated was centered on a Chicano couple and integrated elements from soul, psychedelic rock, and boleros as well as some pop and folk music. In May 2025, they released Portales, a self-described "Mexican romantic ballad of the 1970s, but on acid," and toured the United States for a month. El Imparcial noted they featured in more playlists on Spotify and Amazon Music around this time.

== Discography ==
=== EPs ===
- Vamos a viajar (2011)
- Sobre una nube (2022)

=== Albums ===
- La Segunda Luz del Día (2015)
- Cérès (2017)
- Párpados (2018)
- Redes Sociales (2021)
- Los himnos del amor (2024)
- Portales (2025)
