= Ramona Rhodes =

American geriatrician

Ramona Rhodes is an American geriatrician and physician leader.

== Education ==
Dr. Rhodes graduated summa cum laude from Xavier University of Louisiana with a Bachelor's degree in Biology/Pre-Medicine. She received her medical degree from the University of Arkansas for Medical Sciences in 2000, and completed a residency in Internal Medicine at MetroHealth Medical Center, a teaching affiliate of Case Western Reserve University in 2003. She completed a combined clinical geriatrics and health services research fellowship at Brown University, where she earned a Masters of Public Health degree in 2006. She received additional training in research at the University of Texas Southwestern Medical Center, earning a Masters of Science degree in Clinical Sciences in 2013.

== Career ==
Ramona was on faculty at the University of Texas Southwestern Medical Center from 2009 to 2020. In 2020, she became the Associate Director for Health Services Research for the Geriatric Research, Education, and Clinical Center of the Central Arkansas Veterans Healthcare System. She was also an Associate Professor in the Department of Geriatrics at the University of Arkansas for Medical Sciences. In 2023, Dr. Rhodes returned to the University of Texas Southwestern Medical Center, where she is currently a Professor in the Department of Internal Medicine (Division of Geriatric Medicine) and the O'Donnell School of Public Health. Ramona currently serves on the board of directors for the American Geriatrics Society. She has served as Section Editor for Ethnogeriatrics and Special Populations for the Journal of the American Geriatrics Society and currently serves on the Editorial Board.. She also serves as co-Editor for the Journal of the American Geriatrics Society Diversity on Aging in Research Series.

== Awards ==
- Richard Payne Outstanding Achievement in Diversity, Equity, and Inclusion Award, American Academy of Hospice and Palliative Medicine (2023)
- Fellow of the American Academy of Hospice and Palliative Medicine (FAAHPM) (2017)
- American Geriatrics Society Fellow (AGSF) (2013)
