= Jeff Franklin =

American screenwriter, director and producer (born 1955)

- Born: Jeff Franklin; January 21, 1955 (age 71); Inglewood, California, U.S.
- Occupations: Producer, screenwriter, director
- Years active: 1976–present
- Notable work: Full House; Fuller House

Jeff Franklin (born January 21, 1955) is an American screenwriter, director and producer. He is best known for being the creator of the ABC sitcom Full House and its Netflix sequel Fuller House.

== Early life and education ==
Franklin was born in Inglewood, California. In 1976 Franklin graduated from Raymond College at the University of the Pacific. He worked as a substitute teacher in his hometown, before becoming a writer.

== Career ==
Franklin began his television career as a writer and producer for Laverne & Shirley and Bosom Buddies. Franklin created a sitcom called "House of Comics" which featured three comics living together. ABC was looking for a family sitcom, so Franklin added children and the idea evolved into the show Full House, which ran on the ABC network from 1987 to 1995.

During Full House, Franklin created Hangin' with Mr. Cooper, starring comedian Mark Curry. Franklin departed for Hanging with Mr. Cooper in September 1992. His other television credits include writing, directing and executive producing on shows such as, It's Garry Shandling's Show, and Malcolm & Eddie. He also co-wrote, produced and directed the first Olsen twins movie, To Grandmother's House We Go. By 1991, Franklin had received a deal with Lorimar, but the pact was mutually terminated in 1993. In 1997, he had signed a deal with Columbia TriStar Television.

Franklin's most notable film writing credits include the teen comedies Just One of the Guys (1985) and Summer School (1987), starring Mark Harmon.

=== Fuller House ===
Serving as a sequel to the 1987–1995 ABC series Full House, Fuller House was developed after years of speculation and fan demand for a revival. Franklin, who created the original series, returned to develop the new show, reuniting much of the original cast while introducing a new generation of characters. Netflix officially ordered the series in 2015, with production beginning later that year. Fuller House premiered all 13 episodes of the first season on February 26, 2016, and ran for five seasons.

Canadian pop singer Carly Rae Jepsen revealed she and Butch Walker recreated the Full House theme song, "Everywhere You Look" (originally performed by Jesse Frederick, who co-wrote the song with Bennett Salvay, and Jeff Franklin), for the series as its opening theme which has won 8 BMI Film & TV Awards.

In February 2018, Franklin's deal was not renewed by Warner Bros. Television Studios for the series Fuller House.

In June 2019, The Hollywood Reporter revealed details of a probe made by Warner Bros. that included interviews with eight Fuller House staffers who commented on Franklin's alleged conduct.

Franklin sued the showrunner, blaming the co-executive producer Bryan Behar for orchestrating a conspiracy aiming to get him kicked out of the show, to discredit Franklin and replace him. Franklin denied all the allegations of misconduct. The suit was dismissed with prejudice.

== Personal life ==
Franklin built an Andalusian-style mansion in Beverly Hills designed by architect Richard Landry. In 2014, he listed for sale another house designed by Landry in the Hollywood Hills for US$30 million.

== Filmography ==
=== Film ===
Year	Title	Director	Writer	Producer
1985	Just One of the Guys	No	Yes	No
1987	Summer School	No	Yes	Yes
1999	Love Stinks	Yes	Yes	Executive

=== Television ===
Year	Title	Director	Writer	Producer	Creator
1979	The Bad News Bears	No	Yes	No	No
1979–1981	Laverne & Shirley	No	Yes	No	No
1982	Bosom Buddies	No	Yes	Yes	No
1987	It's Garry Shandling's Show	No	No	Yes	No
1987–1992	Full House	Yes	Yes	Executive	Yes
1997	Head Over Heels	No	Yes	Executive	No
1992–1997	Hangin' with Mr. Cooper	No	Yes	Executive	No
1996–1999	Malcolm & Eddie	No	No	Executive	No
2010	Love That Girl!	No	No	Executive	No
2016–2018	Fuller House	Yes	Yes	Executive	Yes

=== TV movies ===
Year	Title	Director	Writer	Executive Producer
1992	To Grandmother's House We Go	Yes	Yes	Yes
