= Ramona Vogt =

High-energy physicist

Ramona Lynn Vogt
- Education: State University of New York at Stony Brook
- Scientific career
- Fields: Theoretical physics
- Workplaces: Lawrence Livermore National Laboratory; Lawrence Berkeley National Laboratory; University of California at Davis

Ramona Lynn Vogt is a high-energy physicist at Lawrence Livermore National Laboratory.

== Education ==
Vogt received her Ph.D. in 1989 from the State University of New York at Stony Brook with the thesis topic "Charmonium Interactions with Hadronic Matter".

== Career ==
Vogt completed postdoctoral fellowships at Lawrence Livermore National Laboratory (LLNL) and at the GSI in Darmstadt, Germany. She then worked as staff scientist at Lawrence Berkeley National Laboratory before moving back to LLNL. Vogt was elected a Fellow of the American Physical Society (APS) in 2010 and in 2012 served as chair of the APS Topical Group on Hadronic Physics.

Vogt is the author of "Ultrarelativistic Heavy Ion Collisions" (Elsevier, 2007), ISBN 978-0444521965. She is known for her contribution to the understanding of the dynamics of heavy quark and charmonium production in collisions with nuclei and providing guidance for using these probes in experimental investigations of hard dynamics in collisions with nuclei.

== Scientific contributions ==
Vogt has been an author or co-author on over 200 scientific publications, many of which have been highly cited by other researchers. These include:

- Vogt (1999). "J/ψ production and suppression". Physics Reports. 310 (4): 197–260. Bibcode:1999PhR...310..197V. doi:10.1016/S0370-1573(98)00074-X. Volume 310, Issue 4, Pages 197-260
- Vogt (2010). "Cold Nuclear Matter Effects on J/ψ and Υ Production at the CERN Large Hadron Collider (LHC)" Phys. Rev. C 81, 044903.
- Vogt and Brodsky (1995). "Charmed hadron asymmetries in the intrinsic charm coalescence model" Nucl.Phys. B, 478, pp. 311–334
- Brambilla, Eidelman, Heltsley, Vogt, et al. (2011). "Heavy quarkonium: progress, puzzles, and opportunities" Eur.Phys.J. C71, 1534. DOI: 10.1140/epjc/s10052-010-1534-9
- CMS Collaboration (G. L. Bayatian et al.), 2006. CMS Physics : Technical Design Report Volume 1: Detector Performance and Software. CERN-LHCC-2006-001, CMS-TDR-8-1, available at https://cds.cern.ch/record/922757/files/lhcc-2006-001.pdf
- CMS Collaboration (G.L. Bayatian et al.), 2007. CMS technical design report, volume II: Physics performance. J.Phys. G34 (2007) no.6, 995-1579, DOI: 10.1088/0954-3899/34/6/S01

== Honors and awards ==
- Fellow of the American Physical Society (2010)
- 2012 Chair of the APS Topical Group on Hadronic Physics
