= Fuller House (TV series) =

American television series (2016–2020)

- Genre: Sitcom
- Created by: Jeff Franklin
- Showrunners: Jeff Franklin; Steve Baldikoski; Bryan Behar
- Starring: Candace Cameron Bure; Jodie Sweetin; Andrea Barber; Michael Campion; Elias Harger; Soni Nicole Bringas; Dashiell and Fox Messitt; Juan Pablo Di Pace; Scott Weinger; John Brotherton; Ashley Liao; Adam Hagenbuch
- Theme music composer: Jesse Frederick; Bennett Salvay; Jeff Franklin; Butch Walker
- Opening theme: "Everywhere You Look" performed by Carly Rae Jepsen
- Ending theme: "Everywhere You Look" (instrumental)
- Composers: Jesse Frederick; Bennett Salvay
- Country of origin: United States
- Original language: English
- No. of seasons: 5
- No. of episodes: 75 (list of episodes)

Production
- Executive producers: Jeff Franklin; Thomas L. Miller; Robert L. Boyett; Steve Baldikoski; Bryan Behar; John Stamos
- Producers: John Stamos; Kelly Sandefur; Coral Hawthorne; David A. Arnold; Candace Cameron Bure
- Cinematography: Gregg Heschong
- Editors: Richard Candib; Jim Miley
- Running time: 25–36 minutes
- Production companies: Jeff Franklin Productions; Miller-Boyett Productions; Warner Horizon Television

Original release
- Network: Netflix
- Release: February 26, 2016 – June 2, 2020

Related
- Full House

Fuller House is an American sitcom created by Jeff Franklin and produced by Warner Bros. Television Group that aired as a Netflix original series as the sequel to the ABC television series Full House, which ran from 1987 to 1995. It centers around D.J. Tanner-Fuller, a veterinarian and widowed mother of three sons, whose sister Stephanie and best friend Kimmy—along with her teenage daughter—live together at the Tanners' childhood home in San Francisco, California. Most of the original series ensemble cast reprised their roles on Fuller House, either as regular cast members or in guest appearances, with the exception of Mary-Kate and Ashley Olsen, both of whom shared the role of Michelle Tanner in Full House.

Netflix ordered an initial thirteen episodes, which were released on February 26, 2016, worldwide. The second season was released on December 9, 2016. The third season was split into two parts, with the first half of nine episodes being released on September 22, 2017, and the second half on December 22, 2017. On January 29, 2018, Netflix renewed Fuller House for a fourth season, which was released on December 14, 2018.

While the first season reception was generally negative, reviews for the following seasons improved but were still generally mixed. On January 31, 2019, the show was renewed for its fifth and final season of eighteen episodes. The first half premiered on December 6, 2019, while the second half premiered on June 2, 2020.

== Plot ==
Like the original series, the show is set in the same house in San Francisco, California, still owned by Danny Tanner. Recently widowed D.J. Tanner-Fuller is a veterinarian and the mother of three young sons. After the unexpected death of her husband Tommy who was following his hazardous duties as a firefighter, D.J. moves back into her childhood home with her father Danny. However, when Danny has to move away for work, he allows her to continue living there and D.J. accepts the help of her sister Stephanie and best friend Kimmy who move in and take part in raising D.J.'s three sons: 13-year-old Jackson, 7-year-old Max, and baby Tommy Jr. Kimmy's teenage daughter Ramona also moves in.

== Episodes ==
Season	Episodes		Originally released
1	13		February 26, 2016
2	13		December 9, 2016
3	18	9	September 22, 2017
3	18	9	December 22, 2017
4	13		December 14, 2018
5	18	9	December 6, 2019
5	18	9	June 2, 2020

== Cast and characters ==
=== Main ===
- Candace Cameron Bure as D.J. Tanner-Fuller, a widowed mother who has a full-time job as a veterinarian
- Jodie Sweetin as Stephanie Tanner, D.J.'s younger sister, who leaves her life in London to help D.J. raise her kids
- Andrea Barber as Kimmy Gibbler, D.J.'s best friend and owner of a party planning business, who moves in with D.J. and Stephanie to help them raise D.J.'s kids
- Michael Campion as Jackson Fuller, D.J.'s mischievous teenage son
- Elias Harger as Max Fuller, D.J.'s second son, who is a bit of a neat freak like his grandfather
- Soni Nicole Bringas as Ramona Gibbler, Kimmy's teenage daughter
- Dashiell and Fox Messitt as Tommy Fuller, Jr., D.J.'s toddler son who is named after his late father
- Juan Pablo Di Pace as Fernando Hernandez-Guerrero-Fernandez-Guerrero, Kimmy's husband and Ramona's father (recurring: season 1; main: season 2–5)
- Scott Weinger as Steve Hale, a podiatrist and D.J.'s high school sweetheart-turned-husband (recurring: season 1; main: season 2–5)
- John Brotherton as Matt Harmon, co-worker and ex-boyfriend of D.J.'s (recurring: season 1; main: season 2–5)
- Ashley Liao as Lola Wong, Ramona's best friend and Jackson's ex-girlfriend (recurring: seasons 1, 3 and 5; main: season 2)
- Adam Hagenbuch as Jimmy Gibbler, Kimmy's younger brother and a freelance photographer, who is married to Stephanie and has a daughter, Danielle (recurring: season 2; main: season 3–5)

=== Recurring ===
- John Stamos as Jesse Katsopolis, D.J. and Stephanie's uncle
- Bob Saget as Danny Tanner, D.J. and Stephanie's father, and the grandfather of Jackson, Max, Tommy Jr., and Dani
- Dave Coulier as Joey Gladstone, a Vegas comedian who helped Danny raise D.J. and Stephanie
- Lori Loughlin as Rebecca Donaldson-Katsopolis, Jesse's wife and aunt to D.J. and Stephanie (seasons 1–4)
- Blake and Dylan Tuomy-Wilhoit as Nicky and Alex Katsopolis, Jesse and Rebecca's twin sons, and the cousins of DJ and Stephanie, who both spent six years in college and operate a fish taco truck together
- Gianna DiDonato as Crystal, Matt's girlfriend for a brief time in season 2
- Virginia Williams as C.J. Harbenberger, Steve's fiancée who is strikingly similar to D.J.
- Isaak Presley as Bobby Popko, Jackson's best friend and Ramona's ex-boyfriend
- Lucas Jaye as Taylor, Max's intelligent and challenging best friend and neighbor
- Mckenna Grace as Rose Harbenberger, C.J.'s daughter and Max's best friend/love interest
- Marla Sokoloff as Gia Mahan, Stephanie's best friend, and Rocki's mother
- Landry Bender as Rocki, Gia's daughter and Jackson's love interest

== Production ==
=== Development ===
In August 2014, reports circulated that Warner Bros. Television was considering a series reboot. John Stamos, who had an ownership stake in the show, headed up the attempt to get the series back into production. Creator Jeff Franklin returned as showrunner—or leading executive producer—with the collaboration of original executive producers Thomas L. Miller and Robert L. Boyett under their Miller-Boyett Productions label.

In April 2015, it was reported that Netflix was close to closing a deal to produce a 13-episode sequel series tentatively titled Fuller House. A representative for Netflix said that the report was "just a rumor". In response to the report, Bure tweeted, "While you all ponder over whether the Fuller House show is true or is an April Fools joke, check out [link to her upcoming TV movie]", and Stamos tweeted, "Believe none of what you hear, and only half of what you see." On April 20, he appeared on Jimmy Kimmel Live!, confirming the spin-off series had been green-lit by Netflix. On April 21, Netflix confirmed the series was in development.

In a parallel to the original series, Fuller House focuses on D.J., who is a recently widowed mother of three boys, with her sister Stephanie and best friend Kimmy moving in to help raise the boys. The series starts off with a special episode featuring a Tanner family reunion. Filming of the series began in July 2015 and lasted until November 2015. In December 2015, the series' release date was revealed as February 26, 2016. Later in the month, Canadian pop singer Carly Rae Jepsen revealed she and Butch Walker recreated the Full House theme song, "Everywhere You Look" (which was originally performed by Jesse Frederick, who co-wrote the song with Bennett Salvay), for the series as its opening theme.

On March 2, 2016, the series was renewed for a second season, and production for the second season began on May 5, 2016. Thirteen new episodes were ordered and were released on December 9, 2016. On December 24, 2016, the series was renewed for a third season, to be released in 2017. On December 31, 2016, it was confirmed that the season would be 18 episodes. Production for the third season began on March 18, 2017, and ended on September 2, 2017. It was announced on June 26, 2017, that the third season would be split into two parts, with the release of the first part on September 22, 2017, to consist of nine episodes. It was announced on November 13, 2017, that the second half, also consisting of nine episodes, would be released on December 22, 2017. On January 29, 2018, the series was renewed for a fourth season of thirteen episodes. The fourth season was released on December 14, 2018. On January 31, 2019, the show was renewed for its fifth and final season of eighteen episodes, as announced with a farewell video on the show's Twitter account. The first half of the fifth premiered on December 6, 2019, with the second half released on June 2, 2020.

Due to competition on Netflix among over 1,500 other shows and inability to significantly grow its audience the show ended in 2020 after 5 seasons.

=== Casting ===
In addition to Cameron Bure, Sweetin, and Barber reprising their roles, the other main roles went to Michael Campion, Elias Harger, and Soni Bringas, as their children: Jackson and Max Fuller, and Ramona Gibbler, respectively. It was disclosed that John Stamos would have a recurring role as Jesse Katsopolis and would also be producing. Other original main cast members who would be reprising their roles periodically are Lori Loughlin as Becky Katsopolis, Bob Saget as Danny Tanner, and Dave Coulier as Joey Gladstone. Dylan and Blake Tuomy-Wilhoit also make an appearance reprising their roles as Nicky and Alex Katsopolis, respectively. On April 19, 2016, it was announced Ashley Liao, who plays Ramona's best friend, had been upgraded to a series regular.

Additional cast members recurring regularly throughout the series include Juan Pablo Di Pace, playing Kimmy's ex-husband, Fernando, and Scott Weinger, reprising the role of Steve Hale, D.J.'s high school boyfriend. Eva LaRue portrays Danny's wife Teri, and Michael Sun Lee makes an appearance as the adult version of Nathan Nishiguchi's character, Harry Takayama, who was Stephanie's childhood friend.

Shortly after announcing the spin-off series, it was uncertain whether Mary-Kate and Ashley Olsen, who shared the role of Michelle Tanner, would choose to participate. The Olsen twins ultimately rejected the offer because Ashley has not acted in years with no intentions to restart, and Mary-Kate initially considered the part but later declined as it was not feasible with her fashion career at the time. Subsequently, the producers decided to have Michelle reside in New York City, where she is highly focused on her fashion enterprise. By January 2016, they asked the Olsen twins' younger sister, Elizabeth, if she had any ambitions to take the part of Michelle, but she ultimately declined as well. Nevertheless, the producers still prodded the Olsen twins to return and were confident that one of the twins would ultimately decide to reappear during the second season, although this did not end up happening. In September 2016, it was announced that the character Nelson will re-appear on Fuller House, with the character recast to be portrayed by Hal Sparks, who replaces Nelson's original portrayer, Jason Marsden. In September 2017, Jeff Franklin revealed at Paley Fest that Danny's ex, Vicky Larson (Gail Edwards) would return in season three, doing so in the season's finale.

=== Accusations of misconduct regarding Jeff Franklin ===
On February 28, 2018, Variety reported that Jeff Franklin was fired from the series after complaints about his behavior in the writers' room and on the set of the series, which ranged from being verbally abusive to staffers, making sexually charged comments about his personal relationships and sex life in the writers' room, and a complaint of Franklin's habit of bringing women he dated to the set and sometimes giving them guest roles in the series. Franklin has not been accused of directly sexually harassing or engaging in physical misconduct with any staffers. On March 12, 2018, Steve Baldikoski and Bryan Behar were announced as the new executive producers and showrunners for the fourth season, replacing Franklin.

== Reception ==
=== Reviews ===
The first season of Fuller House received generally negative reviews, with most taking issue to the crude humor and noting that the series was very derivative of its source material and was oriented toward fans of the original show. On Rotten Tomatoes, the first season has a rating of 36%, based on 50 reviews, with an average rating of 4.8/10. The site's critical consensus reads, "After the initial dose of nostalgia, Fuller House has little to offer to anyone except the original series' most diehard fans." On Metacritic the series has an average score of 35 out of 100, based on 28 critics, indicating "generally unfavorable reviews".

Dan Fienberg of The Hollywood Reporter panned the show, calling it "a mawkish, grating, broadly played chip off the Full House block". He also added that "It's doubtful that there will be a more painful 2016 TV episode than the Fuller House pilot, which takes an inexcusable 35 minutes to establish a plot that is just an inversion of the original Full House premise." David Weigand of the San Francisco Chronicle reacted similarly, writing: "The episodes are predictable because they're unoriginal and the writing is painful. The canned laughter is perhaps the greatest reminder of the 'good old days'. If only all those recorded voices had something legitimate to laugh at." Maureen Ryan of Variety wrote that the show "continually goes to the well of having cute kids mug for the camera as they practically yell their lines, and just a little of its self-congratulatory, blaring obviousness goes a long way."

In a more positive review, Verne Gay from Newsday wrote that the show is like "Full House 2.0" and that while it has the "same premise, same vibe, mostly same cast", it is "a winner, strictly for fans".

The second season saw generally mixed reviews. Jenny Varner of IGN gave the season a mixed 6.5/10 score. She noted that "Fuller House Season 2 brings a fuller cast, a fuller plot, and a lot more cringe-worthy pop culture jokes. Love it or hate it, the staying power of this heartwarming Netflix staple is stronger than ever." On Rotten Tomatoes, the second season currently has a 50% approval rating based on 6 reviews, with an average rating of 6.3/10.

=== Awards and nominations ===
Year	Association	Category	Nominee(s)	Result	Ref.
2016	Teen Choice Awards	Choice TV Show: Comedy	Fuller House	Won	
2017	People's Choice Awards	Favorite Premium Comedy Series	Fuller House	Won	
2017	Kids' Choice Awards	Favorite Family TV Show	Fuller House	Won	
2018	Kids' Choice Awards	Favorite TV Show	Fuller House	Nominated	
2018	Teen Choice Awards	Choice Comedy TV Show	Fuller House	Nominated	
2018	Primetime Emmy Awards	Outstanding Children's Program	Fuller House	Nominated	
2019	Producers Guild Awards	Outstanding Children's Program	Fuller House	Nominated	
2019	GLAAD Awards	Outstanding Individual Episode	"Prom"	Nominated	
2019	Kids' Choice Awards	Favorite TV Show	Fuller House	Won	
2019	Teen Choice Awards	Choice Comedy TV Show	Fuller House	Nominated	
2020	Casting Society of America	Children's Pilot and Series (Live Action)	Alexis Frank Koczara, Christine Smith Shevchenko, Gianna Butler (Associate)	Nominated	
2020	Kids' Choice Awards	Favorite Family TV Show	Fuller House	Nominated	
2021	Kids' Choice Awards	Favorite Family TV Show	Fuller House	Nominated	

== Home media and syndication ==
Warner Home Video released the first season of the series on DVD in Region 1 on February 28, 2017. The second season was released on DVD in Region 1 on December 12, 2017. The third season was released on DVD in Region 1 on January 22, 2019. The fourth season was released on DVD in Region 1 on December 17, 2019. The fifth and final season was released on DVD in Region 1 on June 8, 2021. The complete series DVD was released on June 8, 2021.

In February 2022, American cable network GAC Family acquired reruns of Fuller House to accompany its syndicated airings of the original Full House; the network stated that it would broadcast the series on an "off-the-clock" schedule to accommodate commercial breaks without needing to edit it for time, as its episodes generally run longer than the standard 21–24 minute length used for half-hour programs with commercials.
