= Ramona Parra =

Chilean political activist

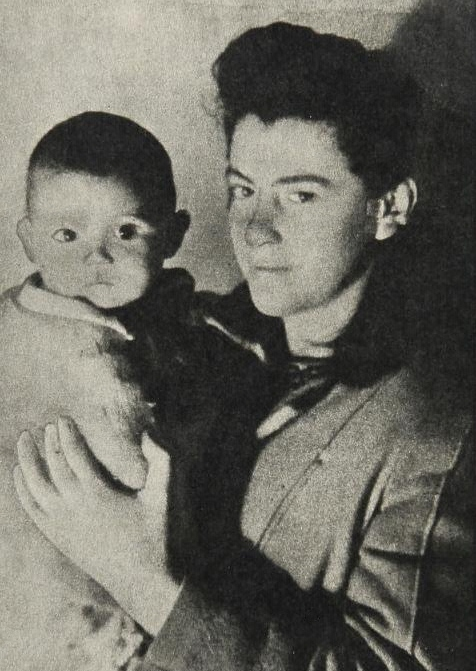
Parra with a child

Ramona Aurelia Parra Alarcón (May 28, 1926 – January 28, 1946) was a Chilean Nitrate worker and communist. She was one of six people shot to death during a demonstration in Santiago de Chile, also known as the Bulnes Square Massacre. She is best known for being the first martyr of the Communist Youth of Chile.

== Early life ==
Ramona was born on May 28, 1926. She grew up in a small one story house.

=== Education and communism ===
Parra, along with her sisters Flor and Olga, entered the Communist Youth of Chile in 1944 while studying at the Higher Institute of Commerce.

== Death ==
In 1946, at the age of 19, she was killed during a march being held by the Chilean Confederation of Workers. The workers were protesting for the rights for the miners in Humberstone, Mapocho and multiple other mining sites, which were denied by Alfredo Duhalde.

== Legacy ==
=== Brigade ===
Her death inspired a communist party named "The Ramona Parra Brigade". It was founded in 1969.
