= Arrest of Robert Seacat =

Destructive standoff and arrest in June 2015

- Date: June 3–4, 2015
- Duration: 19.48 hours
- Location: 4219 South Alton Street Greenwood Village, Colorado, United States; 39.640660°N 104.881046°W
- Type: Police standoff
- Cause: Shoplifting
- Motive: Resisting arrest
- Target: Robert Jonathan Seacat
- Participants: Greenwood Village PD; Aurora Police Department; Arapahoe County Sheriff; Douglas County Sheriff
- Outcome: Seacat apprehended; Lech residence destroyed
- Property damage: US$450,000 (2015) (eq. $611,000 in 2025)
- Charges: 32 criminal charges
- Litigation: Lech v. City of Greenwood Village

The arrest of Robert Jonathan Seacat was the culmination of a destructive 19.48-hour standoff between Seacat and American police in June 2015. After being chased by police for stealing clothing from a Walmart, Seacat barricaded himself in a house at 4219 South Alton Street in Greenwood Village, Colorado owned by Leo Lech. By the time Seacat was finally extracted from the premises, the house had been destroyed by law enforcement in their efforts to flush him out. The homeowner, Leo Lech, filed a lawsuit against the municipality for compensation, but was ruled against by the United States Court of Appeals for the Tenth Circuit; he appealed to the Supreme Court of the United States, but the court declined to hear the case.

== Background ==
Robert Jonathan Seacat (also Robert Seakat) was born in Kansas on May 6, 1982. In June 2015, he was 6 feet 1 inch (1.85 m) tall, weighed 175 pounds (79 kg), was residing in Aurora, Colorado, and was married to Ramona Vitalyevna Grabchenko. With previous convictions for drug possession, aggravated motor vehicle theft, and burglary, on June 3, 2015, Seacat also had three outstanding warrants: two for illegal drugs and one for aggravated motor vehicle theft. As of January 2024, he was six feet (1.8 m) tall and weighed 180 pounds (82 kg).

Leo and Alfonsia Lech bought the house at 4219 South Alton Street for their son, John. In June 2015, John Lech was living in the house with his girlfriend, Anna Mumzhiyan, and her nine-year-old son; he paid his father monthly rent of US$1,300 (equivalent to $1,766 in 2025). John Lech kept an unloaded pistol and 20-gauge shotgun in the master closet, while ammunition was kept elsewhere in the house.

== Standoff ==
According to a police affidavit, on June 3, 2015, Seacat shoplifted two belts and a shirt from a Walmart in Greenwood Village. After assaulting a uniformed Aurora Police Department (APD) officer—John Reiter—with his gold-colored 1999 Lexus GS300, Seacat fled in the vehicle. Reiter soon found the abandoned car at the nearby Dayton station and radioed for a tow. A bystander told Reiter that she saw Seacat holster a .380 ACP semi-automatic pistol when he crossed the rail platform before running across northbound Interstate 225. Reiter lost track of Seacat and returned to the Lexus to inventory its contents: $27 in cash, 12.5 grams (0.44 oz) of psilocybin mushrooms, 45 grams (1.6 oz) of cannabis, and an unidentified 2.9-gram (0.10 oz) blue pill. From 1:43–1:54 pm, a perimeter was established by Greenwood Village (GVPD) and Aurora police.

At 1:54 pm, Seacat entered the home at 4219 South Alton Street in Greenwood Village, twice tripping the security alarm as he did so. The nine-year-old son of Anna Mumzhiyan was home alone, and when he exited the house at 2:17 pm, he described Seacat as the man currently inside the house. After Seacat began opening the garage doors, APD officer William Woods drove a marked departmental sport utility vehicle (SUV) into the garage door to block egress. Seacat responded by blindly firing his pistol through the garage door, striking the SUV approximately one foot (0.30 m) from Woods.

GVPD Commander Dustin Varney took command of the situation, and summoned GVPD SWAT as well as further assistance from the APD, the Arapahoe County sheriff's office, and the Douglas County sheriff's office. GVPD officer Mic Smith, a SWAT negotiator, engaged with Seacat over the telephone; by 6:08 pm, Seacat ceased communicating with police, despite the application of inductive irritants.

At 10:38 pm, SWAT entered the house and used a stun grenade to conceal their movements, but were driven back outside by gunshots (though criminalists would later establish that they were not fired upon). During the next 10.2 hours, a Lenco BearCat was driven through the front door, tear gas and 40 mm grenades were repeatedly launched inside, shots were fired upon the house, and explosives were detonated to destroy several exterior walls. Ultimately, "the home was utterly destroyed" by the time Seacat was apprehended in the upstairs bathroom. According to police, at the time of his arrest, Seacat was carrying a loaded-and-chambered Glock 19 and 6.68 grams (0.236 oz) of suspected methamphetamine.

=== Aftermath ===
In their subsequent search of the house, police found Lech's over and under shotgun unloaded and still in its case. In the master bathroom, police found a loaded Glock 17, 322.54 grams (11.377 oz) of suspected methamphetamine, 1.75 grams (0.062 oz) of methadone, 0.47 grams (0.017 oz) of diazepam, 29.86 grams (1.053 oz) of suspected heroin, 17.5 pills of methylphenidate, 2.44 grams (0.086 oz) of clonazepam, 2.25 grams (0.079 oz) of cannabis, 61 packets of buprenorphine/naloxone, digital weighing scales, dozens of single-use baggies, used syringes and pipes, cash, and multiple cell phones. Another 3.60 grams (0.127 oz) of suspected methamphetamine was found in the bathroom where Seacat was captured. Anthony Costarella, a GVPD officer specializing in narcotics, argued that this cache evidenced Seacat as a drug trafficker.

It was determined that, during the standoff with police, not only was Seacat experiencing the effects of intentionally-ingested methamphetamine, but also of packets of drugs he had swallowed: at Swedish Hospital on June 6, Seacat defecated seven baggies that tested positive for 10.95 grams (0.386 oz) of heroin and 21.19 grams (0.747 oz) of methamphetamine.

On June 9, GVPD Detective John J. Carr applied for an arrest warrant on Seacat. The same day, the Arapahoe County, Colorado district attorney filed 32 charges against Seacat: 17 counts of attempted murder in the first degree, one count of first-degree burglary, one count of menacing, one count of attempted motor vehicle theft, four counts of criminal possession of a weapon, three counts of drug possession, one count of trespass, and four counts of being a habitual criminal. In August 2016, Seacat's jury trial was scheduled to start on that October 4.

As of January 2024, Seacat (inmate number 145189) was imprisoned in the Sterling Correctional Facility for 20 separate convictions, with an estimated mandatory release date of March 3, 2061. He is next eligible for parole on October 4, 2035.

== Lechs' litigation ==
[T]he residence had significant damage to all of the upper floor walls, basement back yard doors and front door. [… A]ll of the rooms in the home had damage and that the amount of debris both inside the home and outside the home was significant.

— Detective John J. Carr, GVPD

When he returned to the house, Leo Lech compared the damage to that done to Osama bin Laden's compound in Abbottabad after Operation Neptune Spear: "[p]rojectiles were still lodged in the walls. Glass and wooden paneling crumbled on the ground below the gaping holes, and inside, the family's belongings and furniture appeared thrashed in a heap of insulation and drywall." Varney defended the police's actions by saying, "My mission is to get that individual out unharmed and make sure my team and everyone else around including the community goes home unharmed […] Sometimes that means property gets damaged, and I am sorry for that." The National Tactical Officers Association supported Varney's assertion that appropriate force had been used in the Seacat standoff.

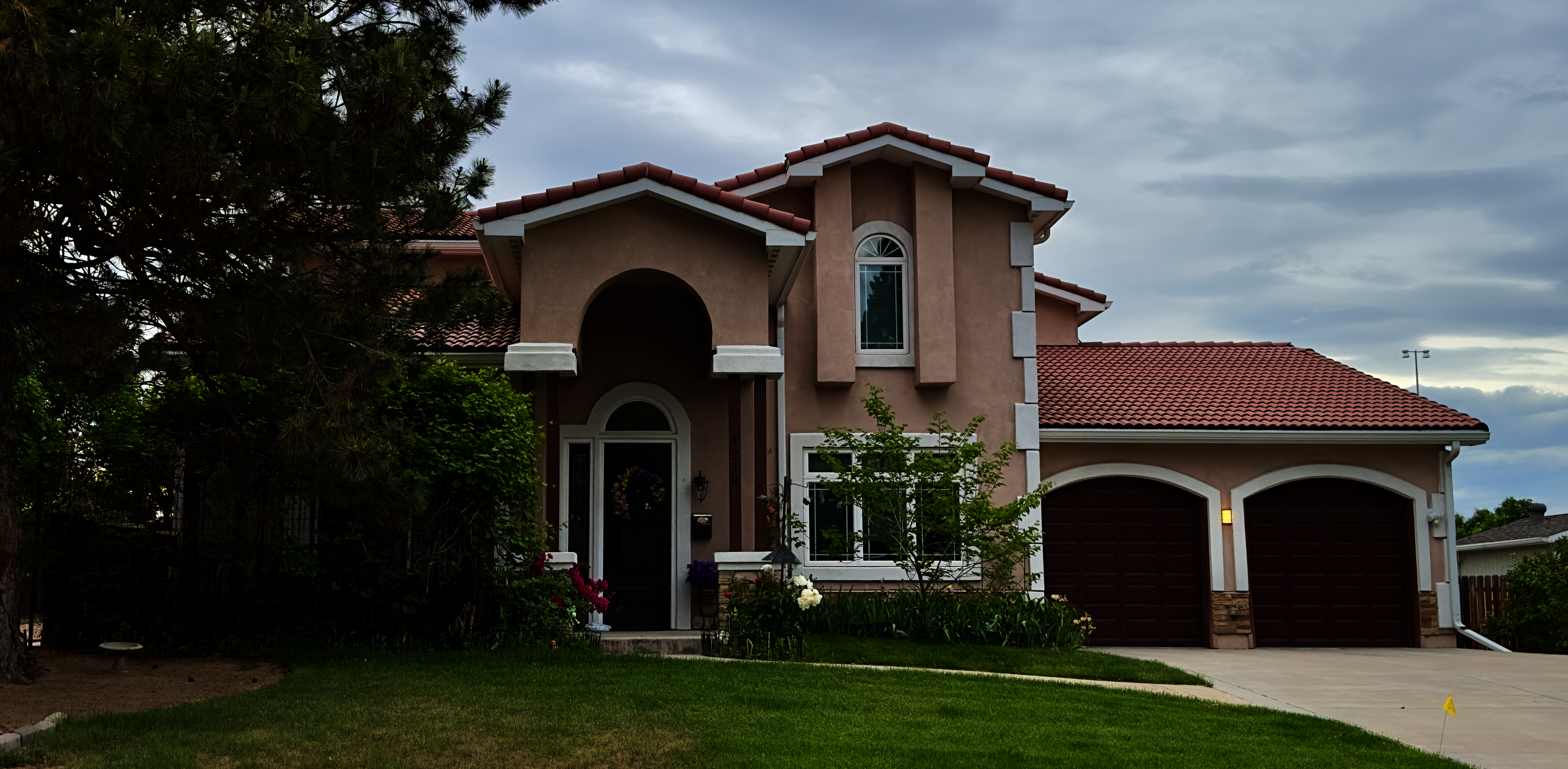
The rebuilt house (June 2024)

Due to the extensive damage, the house was eventually condemned by Greenwood Village, and the remains were razed. John Lech, his girlfriend, and her son, moved into his father's home 30 miles (48 km) from Greenwood Village; the distance of the relocation forced John Lech to change jobs. The city refused to compensate the Lechs, and instead offered $5,000 (equivalent to $6,791 in 2025) "in temporary rental assistance and for the [home] insurance deductible." Alleging that the house's value was $450,000 (equivalent to $611,224 in 2025), the Lechs refused the 1% offer, calling it "insulting"; rebuilding the house cost Leo Lech $400,000. In a 2019 response to an NPR inquiry, Greenwood Village spokesperson Melissa Gallegos said it had been Leo Lech's decision to demolish rather than repair the house, replace the undamaged foundation, and build a larger house than the one that was damaged.

In 2016, the Lechs filed a lawsuit in the United States District Court for the District of Colorado against the participating police officers and Greenwood Village under the takings clause of the Fifth Amendment to the United States Constitution and Article II, Section 15 of the Constitution of Colorado. They claimed that they deserved compensation for "their property [being] seized by the government for public use" (Lech v. City of Greenwood Village), and were willing to settle with the city for $600,000 (equivalent to $804,908 in 2025). The defendants requested and were granted summary judgment by the district court, which ruled that "when a state acts pursuant to its police power, rather than the power of eminent domain, its actions do not constitute a taking". In the past, both the Minnesota and Texas Supreme Courts had sided with litigants whose houses were damaged or destroyed by police actions. The Lechs appealed the ruling to the United States Court of Appeals for the Tenth Circuit (10th Cir.).

In 2019, the three-judge panel of the 10th Cir. ruled against the Lechs, saying unanimously that the destruction of the house fell under police power and that eminent domain was not undertaken. The court sympathized with the Lechs, calling their circumstances "unfair", but ruling that police cannot be "burdened" with the consideration of collateral property damage when performing their duties. The 10th Cir. also noted that "if police officers 'willfully or wantonly' destroy property", then they can be subject to tort law; Leo Lech was also unsuccessful in pursuing that avenue with the courts of Colorado.

As of October 2019, Leo Lech had incurred $28,000 (equivalent to $35,260 in 2025) in attorney's fees. On March 11, 2020, the Institute for Justice filed a petition for writ of certiorari with the Supreme Court of the United States. The Supreme Court denied certiorari on June 29, 2020, letting the lower court's ruling stand.
