= Ramona Bressie =

American literary scholar

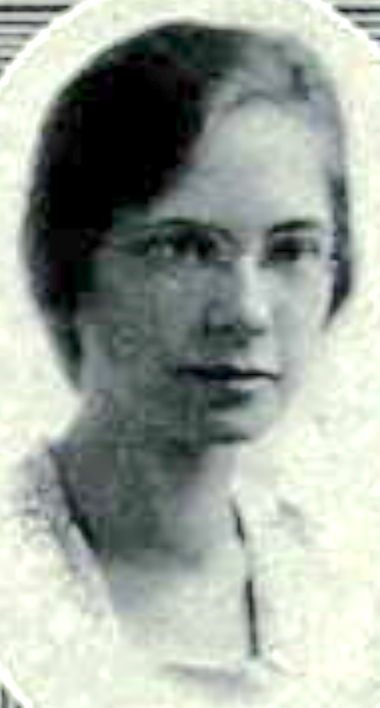
- Ramona Bressie, from the 1920 yearbook of the University of Chicago
- Born: December 3, 1894; Gilman, Illinois, U.S.
- Died: April 11, 1970 (age 75); London, U.K.
- Occupations: Literary scholar, medievalists
- Known for: The Chaucer Life Records Project

Ramona Bressie (December 3, 1894 – April 11, 1970) was an American literary scholar, known for her work on the Chaucer Life-Records Project at the University of Chicago.

== Early life and education ==
Bressie was born in Gilman, Illinois and raised in Joliet, the daughter of A. J. Bressie and Mae Melissa Moore Bressie. Her father was a railroad engineer who died in 1929. She had a sister, Lorna, who died in 1930. She graduated from University of Chicago in 1920, and earned a master's degree there in 1925. She completed doctoral studies there in 1928, under advisor Edith Rickert, with a dissertation on Thomas Usk.

== Career ==
Bressie worked on the Chaucer Life-Records Project at the University of Chicago, with her mentor Edith Rickert and with John Matthews Manly, beginning in 1927. As an independent scholar, not a member of the university's faculty, she did original research, traveled to England, made maps, maintained lists and bibliographies, and wrote articles, often as a volunteer project helper, though sometimes with a small stipend or reimbursement for her expenses. For example, from 1933 to 1934, she held the Alice Freeman Palmer Fellowship from the American Association of University Women, for an ambitious bibliographic project.

After Manly and Rickert died in 1940 and 1938, respectively, the project passed into control of others at Chicago. Bressie had to fight for access to the work she had already contributed. She continued her research and writing on Chaucer, despite this exclusion, and despite her increasingly dire financial situation. In 1960, a cousin had her institutionalized as "mentally deranged"; she successfully argued for her sanity and was released after three months. In 1964, she moved to England, where she died on 11 April 1970. She is buried in an unmarked grave in East Finchley, North London..

== Publications ==
Bressie's work was published in academic journals including Modern Philology, Modern Language Notes, and The Journal of English and Germanic Philology.

- "The Date of Thomas Usk's Testament of Love" (1928)
- "Chaucer's Scrivener" (1929)
- "MS Sloane 3548, Folio 158" (1939)
- "'A Governour Wily and Wys'" (1939)
- "Libraries of the British Isles in the Anglo-Saxon Period" (1939)
- "Was Chaucer at the Siege of Paris?" (1940)
- "Chaucer's Monk Again" (1941)
- "Modern Textual Corruption in MS Cambridge Additional 3470" (1945)

== Personal life ==
Bressie died in 1970, at the age of 75, in London. Her remaining papers are in the University of Chicago Library. Her "vivid" diaries are considered especially useful in their insights about the American community of Chaucer scholars in the twentieth century.
