= Full House season 7 =

Full House
- Season 7
- DVD cover
- Starring: John Stamos; Bob Saget; Dave Coulier; Candace Cameron; Jodie Sweetin; Mary-Kate and Ashley Olsen; Lori Loughlin; Andrea Barber; Scott Weinger; Blake & Dylan Tuomy-Wilhoit
- No. of episodes: 24

Release
- Original network: ABC
- Original release: September 14, 1993 – May 17, 1994

Season chronology
- ← Previous; Season 6 Next → Season 8

The seventh season of the sitcom Full House originally aired on ABC between September 14, 1993 and May 17, 1994.

== Plot ==
In season seven, Danny ends his relationship with Vicky after she is offered a news anchor position in New York City. Jesse ends up renovating and re-opening The Smash Club as he is the new owner. Rebecca and Jesse realize that they need to start disciplining the twins. Meanwhile, the family suffers a tremendous blow when Jesse's beloved grandfather comes for a visit and dies of old age in his sleep - a loss that Jesse and Michelle take the hardest. He and Joey continue their radio gig, and Joey later becomes Michelle's new soccer coach. D.J. and Steve try to make their relationship work once he starts college. D.J. is a junior in high school. Stephanie begins middle school (sixth grade). Michelle enters second grade.

== Main cast ==
- John Stamos as Jesse Katsopolis
- Bob Saget as Danny Tanner
- Dave Coulier as Joey Gladstone
- Candace Cameron as D.J. Tanner
- Jodie Sweetin as Stephanie Tanner
- Mary-Kate and Ashley Olsen as Michelle Tanner
- Lori Loughlin as Rebecca Donaldson-Katsopolis
- Andrea Barber as Kimmy Gibbler
- Scott Weinger as Steve Hale
- Blake & Dylan Tuomy-Wilhoit as Nicky & Alex Katsopolis

== Episodes ==
No. overall	No. in season	Title	Directed by	Written by	Original release date	U.S. viewers (millions)
145	1	"It Was a Dark and Stormy Night"	John Tracy	Marc Warren & Dennis Rinsler	September 14, 1993	17.8
D.J., Stephanie, and Michelle anxiously return to the site of their summer camp, but they are surprised with how everything turns out. Meanwhile, Nicky and Alex will not sleep in their own beds, preferring Jesse and Becky's bed.
146	2	"The Apartment"	John Tracy	Tom Burkhard	September 21, 1993	17.6
Steve moves into his own apartment, and D.J. is excited about how much privacy she and Steve can get over there, but a worried Danny spies on them through a window when D.J. breaks curfew. Meanwhile, Michelle is unable to find a hobby for Hobby Day at school, so she begins collecting leaves from the yard, much to Stephanie and Danny's dismay. Jesse and Joey try to pave the driveway – with disastrous results.
147	3	"Wrong-Way Tanner"	John Tracy	Jamie Tatham & Chuck Tatham	September 28, 1993	19.2
While playing a soccer game, Michelle accidentally scores the winning goal for the opposing team. Her team gets angry at her, which leaves Michelle feeling terrible and never wanting to play soccer again by feigning a broken leg. Joey isn't fooled and tells her that she shouldn't let others bring her down for making one unintentional mistake. Meanwhile, Stephanie is videotaping her family for a school project, but catches all of them in humiliating moments.
148	4	"Tough Love"	Joel Zwick	Ellen Guylas	October 5, 1993	23.7
Jesse and Becky, with some guidance from the rest of the family, realize that the twins are not being disciplined enough, when they roam aimlessly around the house and end up destroying Michelle's science project. Danny bribes the girls to pretend to like Vicky's cooking.
149	5	"Fast Friends"	John Tracy	Bob Sand	October 12, 1993	23.9
Stephanie goes to junior high school, and attempts to make new friends, thanks to a new redistricting plan. She meets a girl named Mickey. However, the group Mickey was friends with tries encouraging her to smoke cigarettes. Stephanie is even more sad when Mickey hadn't spoke up on her behalf. Meanwhile, D.J., Kimmy, and Steve join Jesse and Joey on a special segment of their radio show, of which Jesse and Joey argue about the segment's title. Stephanie, in a fake accent as "Olga," asks what to do about her problem. Danny, overhearing her call, tells her to trust her instincts. The next day at school, Stephanie stands up to Mickey's friends. Mickey rejects them and leaves with Stephanie.
150	6	"Smash Club: The Next Generation"	John Tracy	Carolyn Omine	October 19, 1993	22.3
Jesse inherits the "Smash Club," but needs a bank loan because the place needs to be brought up to code. During an interview, Jesse uses D.J., Stephanie, and Michelle to help him pass code inspections. Meanwhile, Michelle gets two new assistants: Nicky and Alex.
151	7	"High Anxiety"	John Tracy	Tom Amundsen	October 26, 1993	23.1
Danny forgets how fast Michelle is growing up, and unintentionally treats her like a baby. Michelle gets mad at Danny, and he agrees to let her grow up and be a "big girl," even though it hurts so much. Meanwhile, Jesse struggles on making decisions for the reopening of the Smash Club.
152	8	"Another Opening, Another No Show"	John Tracy	Story by : Elias Davis; Teleplay by : Tom Burkhard	November 2, 1993	20.8
Jesse officially opens the "Smash Club," but inadvertently gets locked in a storage closet with Kimmy, and other calamities ensue. The kids become waiters and Danny is mostly hyper from drinking too much coffee. Ben Stein makes a guest appearance.
153	9	"The Day of the Rhino"	James O'Keefe	Adam I. Lapidus	November 9, 1993	25.5
Michelle and Denise get "ripped off" when they order Rigby the Rhino dolls that end up being miniature plastic figures. They, Stephanie, Kimmy, and Joey protest at a Rigby showing. Meanwhile, D.J. and Steve face their own problems when preparing for an opera, including hair and honesty with Danny, Jesse, Becky, and Vicky.
154	10	"The Prying Game"	John Tracy	Ellen Guylas	November 16, 1993	23.9
Stephanie incurs D.J.'s anger when she tries to investigate Steve after witnessing him flirting with another girl. Meanwhile, Danny, Jesse, and Joey try to sell a new hair-spraying product on an infomercial, but they find out that it was already made via a live phone call directly from its inventor.
155	11	"The Bicycle Thief"	John Tracy	Chuck Tatham & Jamie Tatham	November 23, 1993	21.6
Michelle loses her bike and assumes that someone stole it. Jesse, Danny, and Joey each go look for the bike, but they unintentionally steal three bikes that look like Michelle's. The neighborhood "crime catchers" (Kimmy and Mrs. Carruthers) start to investigate, while the family hopelessly tries to hide the stolen bikes.
156	12	"Support Your Local Parents"	James O'Keefe	Bob Sand	November 30, 1993	24.0
Jesse and Becky join a local support group when Nicky and Alex will not interact with other children in their playgroup, just each other. Meanwhile, D.J. gets a traffic ticket for vision obstruction when Kimmy decides to air out her socks by sticking her feet out the window of the car. Stephanie and Michelle blackmail D.J. with the ticket to take her clothes from her closet.
157	13	"The Perfect Couple"	John Tracy	Marc Warren & Dennis Rinsler	December 14, 1993	19.5
Joey gets a job as the host of a local game show, The Perfect Couple. He gets the family to do the first show with him, with D.J. and Steve as the dating couple, Jesse and Becky as the married couple, and Danny and Vicky as the engaged couple. Vicky cannot make it on time, so Danny has to pair up with an old woman named Estelle. The director of the show tells Joey to embarrass the contestants, and he does, much to the family's dismay. At the end of the show, Vicky arrives and tells Danny that she accepted a job as a network anchor in New York City. Danny tells her that he cannot take a long-distance relationship, and the two break off their engagement and break up, although they still have feelings for each other. Back home, Stephanie, who is helping Kimmy babysit Michelle, Nicky, and Alex, has trouble getting Nicky and Alex into their pajamas and into bed. Note: This episode marks the final appearance of Vicky Larson (Gail Edwards). This episode is the first to show D.J. Tanner with a haircut, but the cutting never showed.
158	14	"Is It True About Stephanie?"	Joel Zwick	Carolyn Omine	January 4, 1994	25.8
Gia (Marla Sokoloff) and Stephanie both have a crush on Jamie, the new boy in school. When Jamie asks Stephanie out on a date, Gia is enraged and attempts to make her life miserable if she does not cancel it. Stephanie and her friend Mickey attempt to take revenge against Gia and then learn that it is not the right way to go. Meanwhile, Danny tries to cope with his breakup with Vicky, rearranging everything in the house and even having a Japanese-style dinner on the floor. He realizes changes in his life doesn't mean changes to the household. With help, he gets over it. Note: Several of the show's crew members surnames are used as Gia's teachers, as shown on her blown-up report card.
159	15	"The Test"	John Tracy	Dan Chasin & Linda Lane	January 11, 1994	21.8
D.J. is nervous about taking the upcoming SAT test. The night before the test is given, D.J. has a nightmare about the test going all wrong: an angry neighbor turns out to be the proctor, Jesse and Joey try to help her cheat from a breakfast burrito which turns out to be a walkie talkie, Danny and Rebecca film the test for Wake Up, San Francisco, and even Vanna White appears. D.J. finds that while Kimmy passed and is going to Stanford (D.J.'s dream college), she had failed and is expected to go to "Clown U". She wakes up from the dream, and goes to her test, taking it with confidence. Meanwhile, Michelle goes overboard with her whistle reporting "safety violations". Note: A sequel was produced in season eight, titled "Taking the Plunge". Vanna White guest stars as herself and D.J.'s test proctor at the end.
160	16	"Joey's Funny Valentine"	John Tracy	Adam I. Lapidus	January 25, 1994	25.3
Joey's girlfriend, Roxy (Felicia Michaels), meets the family for the first time, but then makes fun of them during her stand-up comedy routine, which alienates the Tanners. Meanwhile, after finding the parrot of a huge store owner, the girls get a store credit, but what will they get?
161	17	"The Last Dance"	John Tracy	Tom Amundsen	February 8, 1994	26.6
Jesse's grandfather, Papouli, comes to visit the Tanner family. During his visit, a strong relationship builds between him and Michelle. He promises Michelle that, for show and tell at school, he will come and do a Greek dance with her. Sadly, Papouli dies of a heart attack in his sleep the night before. Everyone is mourning, but especially Michelle and Jesse, due to their strong relationship with Papouli. Jesse ends up saving the day by going to school with Michelle and doing the dance for show and tell. Two subplots: D.J. and Kimmy get into a fight over a pair of sunglasses, and Danny fulfills a longtime dream of his and Joey's by buying a boat. Both stories tie in with the main plot as the men decide to christen the boat "Papouli," and Kimmy and D.J. resolve their feud after Steve intervenes by informing Kimmy, offscreen, about Papouli's death. Note: In the original ABC airing, John Stamos appears as himself prior to the episode telling parents that this episode deals with death in the family.
162	18	"Kissing Cousins"	John Tracy	Tom Burkhard	February 15, 1994	22.6
The series returns to comedic form when Jesse comes home from Papouli’s funeral in Greece. To the family’s shock - Jesse brings back his sleazy doppelgänger cousin Stavros, who ends up taking advantage of the Tanners' generosity and kindness. Stavros later apologizes, claiming his village was destroyed in an accident, for which the family stages a dance marathon at the Smash Club. However, he actually lied and was planning to go to Orlando, Florida, which comes to light when Rebecca tricks him into revealing his plan over the club's PA system which angers the family and Jesse kicks Stavros out of his life. Jesse initially plans to end the dance-off, and return the swindled money, but the family and patrons opt to continue it, and donate the money to a children's hospital. Note: Along with his usual role as Jesse, John Stamos appears in a dual role as Stavros.
163	19	"Love on the Rocks"	Tom Rickard	Ellen Guylas	March 1, 1994	22.9
Feeling that her relationship with Steve has drifted apart, D.J. explores all other options, before ultimately breaking up with him. Meanwhile, Joey plays a pre-April Fool's Day prank on the family and they try to get back at him with a prank of their own, involving a lottery ticket.
164	20	"Michelle a la Carte"	John Tracy	Cathy Jung	March 15, 1994	22.3
Michelle decides to enter a Soap Box Derby. She and Becky begin working on the car that Michelle will ride, but Michelle quits after a fellow racer makes fun of her for being a "girl racer" and saying girls are not good with cars. However, Danny and Jesse help Michelle prove her fellow racers wrong. Subplots include D.J. trying to deal with her recent breakup and Stephanie teaching Joey ballet.
165	21	"Be Your Own Best Friend"	Joel Zwick	Story by : Marc Warren & Dennis Rinsler; Teleplay by : Tom Amundsen & Ellen Guylas	April 5, 1994	19.8
Michelle is assigned a project to draw the outline of her best friend on paper, but Teddy moves back to San Francisco, leaving Michelle to choose between Denise (new) and Teddy (old) with their possessions. Meanwhile, Jesse feels left out when Joey and his girlfriend, Roxy, hog the mic on Jesse and Joey's radio show.
166	22	"A Date with Fate"	Joel Zwick	Story by : Marc Warren & Dennis Rinsler; Teleplay by : Bob Sand & Chuck Tatham & Jamie Tatham	May 3, 1994	16.7
D.J. and Danny go out on separate blind dates, but end up alone together at the same restaurant. Jesse prepares for Mother's Day, but the twins want to celebrate it a day early, much to his chagrin.
167	23	"Too Little Richard Too Late"	John Tracy	Story by : Marc Warren & Dennis Rinsler; Teleplay by : Elias Davis	May 10, 1994	17.0
Joey decides to run for PTA President to help save Michelle's art class, but finds it hard to compete with Mrs. Carruthers' extensive promotion campaign, only for Denise's uncle, Little Richard to come in to help. Despite Joey's rally being a success, Mrs. Carruthers informs the audience that a candidate must have a child enrolled at the school; since Joey doesn't, he is disqualified. Joey then makes an impassioned speech on what really a parent is, overall saying that a parent is someone who cares a lot. Everyone applauds, including Mrs. Carruthers, who was taken by the speech. She convinces Joey to be a co-president with her. He accepts and they decide to save the art program.
168	24	"A House Divided"	Joel Zwick	Story by : Marc Warren & Dennis Rinsler; Teleplay by : Tom Burkhard & Adam I. Lapidus & Carolyn Omine	May 17, 1994	16.3
The whole family complains about the lack of space in the house, including Joey hogging the bathroom for an hour when D.J. needs to use it and Stephanie complaining about Michelle using the room to practice "Down in the Valley" with her harmonica when she needs the same room to study homework and projects. But when a millionaire, Lou Bond (Keene Curtis), who lived in the Tanner house growing up wants to buy it from Danny, offering twice as much money as the house is worth, everyone agrees and is excited about moving and starting new lives, except little Michelle, and she will stop at nothing to stay in "the only house she's ever lived in". Danny ultimately declines the offer. Mr. Bond initially laughs at their sentiments towards the house, until he realizes that if he had bought it, he would have to live next to Kimmy, to which he says while leaving, "Some things are just not meant to be." Note: This is the last appearance of Scott Weinger as Steve, until the series finale.

== See also ==
- List of Full House episodes
