= Full House season 6 =

Full House
- Season 6
- DVD cover
- Starring: John Stamos; Bob Saget; Dave Coulier; Candace Cameron; Jodie Sweetin; Mary-Kate and Ashley Olsen; Lori Loughlin; Andrea Barber; Scott Weinger
- No. of episodes: 24

Release
- Original network: ABC
- Original release: September 22, 1992 – May 18, 1993

Season chronology
- ← Previous; Season 5 Next → Season 7

The sixth season of the sitcom Full House originally aired on ABC between September 22, 1992 and May 18, 1993.

== Plot ==
In season six, Danny proposes to Vicky as she gladly accepts. Jesse and Joey both quit their daytime jobs and become radio hosts on the show "Rush Hour Renegades," which eventually turns into a success. Rebecca also has to deal with Jesse's recent climb to stardom as he tours Japan with his band for the first half of the season, in the second half of the season, he returns to high school to get his diploma. D. J. is a sophomore in high school and gets her first real boyfriend, Steve Hale, who begins his senior year in high school. Stephanie is in fifth grade. Michelle starts first grade.

== Main cast ==
- John Stamos as Jesse Katsopolis
- Bob Saget as Danny Tanner
- Dave Coulier as Joey Gladstone
- Candace Cameron as D. J. Tanner
- Jodie Sweetin as Stephanie Tanner
- Mary-Kate and Ashley Olsen as Michelle Tanner
- Lori Loughlin as Rebecca Donaldson-Katsopolis
- Andrea Barber as Kimmy Gibbler
- Scott Weinger as Steve Hale

== Episodes ==
No. overall	No. in season	Title	Directed by	Written by	Original release date	U.S. viewers (millions)
121	1	"Come Fly with Me"	Joel Zwick	Marc Warren & Dennis Rinsler	September 22, 1992	25.3
The family awaits D.J.'s return from her trip to Spain. D.J. tells her family she has a big surprise for them, only it turns out to be her new boyfriend, which is a concern to Danny. Stephanie and Michelle are not amused by Steve and after a boring summer, they decide to have some fun by illegally sneaking onto a plane to New Zealand. Both of them were punished by their father.
122	2	"The Long Goodbye"	Joel Zwick	Ellen Guylas	September 29, 1992	24.0
Michelle attempts to "kidnap" her best friend, Teddy (Tahj Mowry), when she finds out that he is moving to Texas. Jesse doesn't want the boys playing with a baby doll. Meanwhile, with Vicky living in Chicago because of her job, Danny is making important decisions on how they will maintain a long-distance relationship.
123	3	"Road to Tokyo"	Joel Zwick	Ken Hecht	October 6, 1992	26.1
Jesse's song "Forever" is number 1 on the music charts—in Japan; but the pleasures of Jesse's stardom affect Becky in a negative way, and Jesse gets offered a year-long tour across the Pacific. Meanwhile, D.J. tries to help Kimmy run for student body president.
124	4	"Radio Days"	Richard Correll	Tom Burkhard	October 13, 1992	22.3
Jesse and Joey are offered jobs as afternoon radio DJs, but when Joey makes jokes about Jesse, they start arguing with each other. Meanwhile, Joey deals with Mr. Strowbridge's wife as a partner, and Stephanie's short story has characters that are closely related to D.J. and Steve.
125	5	"Lovers and Other Tanners"	Joel Zwick	Jay Abramowitz	October 20, 1992	24.3
D.J. forgets all her priorities when her relationship with Steve begins to grow, causing Danny to forbid them from seeing each other, only his actions caused the father-daughter relationship to fall apart. Meanwhile, Jesse and Joey debut their radio show Rush Hour Renegades, although Jesse comes down with a cold right before the show.
126	6	"Educating Jesse"	Joel Zwick	Tom Burkhard	October 27, 1992	24.9
D.J. and Kimmy launch a "Stay in School" campaign and ask Jesse to compose a song for it, but Jesse declines. When asked why not, he admits that it would be hypocritical to do so as he dropped out of high school, but their campaign has inspired him to earn his GED. Meanwhile, Michelle tries to learn how to tie her shoes.
127	7	"Trouble in Twin Town"	Joel Zwick	Ellen Guylas	November 10, 1992	24.4
Becky's rich cousins, Dick (Mark Linn-Baker) and Donna Donaldson, come to visit with their twin daughters, and are going to enter them in a local "Best Twins" contest. The twins are brats, and Dick and Donna won't stop insulting Jesse, which prompts Jesse to enter Nicky and Alex into the contest so that he can beat them.
128	8	"The Play's the Thing"	Joel Zwick	Tom Amundsen	November 17, 1992	25.6
Jesse and Joey direct Michelle's school play, "America the Beautiful", and Michelle wants to play the lead role of Yankee Doodle because both of her sisters played the part when they were her age. Jesse and Joey choose her, but the last person to audition is clearly better than Michelle, so Jesse and Joey pick him and Michelle is infuriated. Meanwhile, Danny tries to spend time with Nicky and Alex because Michelle is growing up. D.J. and Steve argue about D.J. making decisions on Steve's behalf. Erika Ishii guest stars.
129	9	"Nice Guys Finish First"	Joel Zwick	Jamie Tatham & Chuck Tatham	November 24, 1992	25.8
Joey plans to play in a charity hockey game, but Herschel "Stonewall" Binkley comes back to hassle Joey with a bad memory that Joey would much rather forget. Meanwhile, Michelle is scared by Goatboy and Muttman's stories and gets more afraid when Joey starts acting aggressively. After realizing he scared her, he promises not to be mean. However, he becomes an ineffective hockey player.
130	10	"I'm Not D.J."	Richard Correll	Sarit Katz & Gloria Ketterer	December 1, 1992	25.9
Stephanie wants to get her ears pierced after seeing two of her peers with pierced ears, but Danny thinks she is not ready yet because D.J. did not get her ears pierced until starting junior high school. Tired of being babied and doing everything the same as D.J. did, Stephanie makes a big mistake by letting Kimmy pierce her ears and they become infected. Danny takes her to the doctor and she will be punished after she gets back from the doctor. Meanwhile, Nicky and Alex get their first haircut at Joey's Uncle Jasper's (Dave Coulier in a dual role) barber shop.
131	11	"Designing Mothers"	Joel Zwick	Sarit Katz & Gloria Ketterer	December 8, 1992	24.8
Vicky's mother, Liz, re-decorates Stephanie and Michelle's room, but Danny is not ready to change his ways or his environment. They argue which leads to them breaking up. Stephanie and Michelle hatch a plan to get them back together. Meanwhile, Jesse and Joey get a new boss, Alison "The Ax" Axelrod, which frightens them. They fear she will fire everybody and switch to classical music. One day, Alison meets them and gives them two envelopes, which Jesse thinks is a pink slip. Before she tells him, Jesse tells him that he and Joey quit. However, Joey stays. Jesse leaves. Alison reveals that it was only a parking pass.
132	12	"A Very Tanner Christmas"	Joel Zwick	Jay Abramowitz	December 15, 1992	24.1
The Tanners celebrate Christmas, only for D.J. to find out that Steve is planning to move to Florida for college, upon graduating. Danny is sad that he won't be spending Christmas with Vicky. She ends up surprising him. Meanwhile, Becky misses having white Christmases in Nebraska, and Jesse takes Stephanie and Michelle to a homeless shelter to show them the real meaning of Christmas.
133	13	"The Dating Game"	Joel Zwick	Jerry Winnick	January 5, 1993	27.3
Stephanie "goes out" with a friend, thinking that it is an actual date. Stephanie gets nervous and decides to read a teen magazine to help her. Her date turns out to be a get-together with the boys' baseball team. An embarrassed Stephanie decides to follow D.J. Meanwhile, Joey has a crush on his boss at the radio station, so Jesse sets up a date for them.
134	14	"Birthday Blues"	John Tracy	Mark Fink	January 19, 1993	27.1
Preoccupied with celebrating her six-month anniversary with Steve, D.J. forgets about Kimmy's 16th birthday, so a last-minute party is concocted with the help of her family. Steve accidentally tells Kimmy that D.J. put the party together in fifteen minutes.
135	15	"Be True to Your Preschool"	Joel Zwick	Tom Amundsen	January 26, 1993	N/A
Jesse lies on an application for the twins to get into an exclusive pre-school, but he has to think fast when the school says that they are interested. Kimmy gets her driver's license and takes the Tanner girls for a ride in her brother's car, "The Wild Thing". When they see the chess team, they attempt to gloat, but the boys have the last laugh when the girls get locked out of the car with the keys inside.
136	16	"The Heartbreak Kid"	Joel Zwick	Cathy Jung	February 9, 1993	25.4
Steve gives Michelle a Valentine's Day cookie, which leads to her believing that Steve wants to marry her. However, after a cute mock ceremony, Michelle discovers it is not the real thing, which upsets her. Meanwhile, Jesse tries to figure out how to use a computer, and Danny and Joey reminisce about an old flame.
137	17	"Silence Is Not Golden"	Joel Zwick	Ken Hecht	February 16, 1993	27.6
Stephanie is paired up with her nemesis Charles on a school project. He comes to her house to work on it and Stephanie finds out that his father physically abuses him, but she is sworn to secrecy. Meanwhile, Michelle has been calling a 1-900 "Funny Buddy" on the phone without her father's permission, knowing it costs $2 a minute. The next day, Charles is not at school, and Stephanie realizes that his father has hurt him again. Danny finds out about Michelle's phone calls after receiving the latest bill and punishes her by having her go to bed an hour earlier for a week. Then Michelle goes upstairs and says mean things about Danny, causing an argument with Stephanie. Jesse intervenes, and Stephanie finally gives in and tells Jesse, who calls the police and has Charles put into a foster family home away from his father. Stephanie feels guilty at first about Charles being separated from his father, but then she realizes that telling an adult was the right thing to do, and starts to appreciate her own father. Note: At the end of the episode, John Stamos and Jodie Sweetin give a PSA encouraging viewers to speak out about child abuse.
138	18	"Please Don't Touch the Dinosaur"	John Tracy	Jamie Tatham & Chuck Tatham	February 23, 1993	28.3
Danny and Jesse chaperones Michelle's class trip to the museum, but Jesse is unable to keep discipline in his group of children, leading to terrible events. Meanwhile, Stephanie accidentally gives one of Joey's valuable baseball cards to Steve.
139	19	"Subterranean Graduation Blues"	John Tracy	Story by : Marc Warren & Dennis Rinsler; Teleplay by : Tom Burkhard	March 2, 1993	25.6
On the way to his high school graduation, Jesse and the family get stuck on the subway. Kimmy babysits the twins, with disastrous results, involving finger paint. Also, D.J. has a skiing trip according to Steve. Absent: Candace Cameron as D.J. Tanner
140	20	"Grand Gift Auto"	John Tracy	Ellen Guylas	March 16, 1993	26.3
Joey gets D.J. a 1977 Pontiac Firebird for her 16th birthday, but later, it is revealed that Joey did not get a pink slip showing that he bought the car, making the police officer believe that he stole it. The way the family handles it doesn't make him feel any better and he considers leaving. They later convince him to stay but allowed him to visit his mother for two days.
141	21	"Room for One More?"	Tom Rickard	Story by : Marc Warren & Dennis Rinsler; Teleplay by : Stacey Hur	April 6, 1993	20.9
Jesse tries to prove to Becky that they can have another baby, despite their busy lives, and the responsibilities of taking care of Nicky and Alex. But it turns out to be a disaster when Stephanie and Michelle care for a neighbor's pig, Nicky has a cold, Joey gets rollerblade injuries, and Becky gets a new weekend job.
142	22	"Prom Night"	Joel Zwick	Adrienne Armstrong & Martie Cook	May 4, 1993	20.2
D.J. and Steve go to the prom, where Steve and his ex-girlfriend are announced as "King" and "Queen" of the prom. Meanwhile, Danny feels intimidated when he finds out Vicky is older and stronger than him.
143	23	"The House Meets the Mouse – Part 1"	Joel Zwick	Marc Warren & Dennis Rinsler	May 11, 1993	18.7
When Jesse is sent to Walt Disney World, he brings Becky for their anniversary, however, the Tanners get to go too much to Jesse's dismay. While there, Joey goes to Disney–MGM Studios, meets animator Mark Henn (appearing as himself) and draws an animation of himself, which comes to life. Jesse must work instead of spending time with Becky. Danny makes many attempts to propose to Vicky. D.J., Kimmy, Stephanie and Michelle find an attraction where the first person to "make the genie appear" by rubbing the "magic lamp" gets three wishes. Michelle cuts in front of Stephanie and is named "Princess of the Day", which upsets Stephanie. She uses her first wish to ride anything with no lines. They then ride the carousel over six times and Michelle will not let them ride anything else. When Michelle overhears the other girls' conversation about how bossy she's getting, she runs away. Meanwhile, D.J. sees Steve in everyone, including Prince Charming, Mary Poppins, Captain Hook, Peter Pan, Robin Hood, Indiana Jones and Aladdin (who was also voiced by Scott Weinger in the 1992 film).
144	24	"The House Meets the Mouse – Part 2"	Joel Zwick	Marc Warren & Dennis Rinsler	May 18, 1993	22.4
Michelle uses her second wish to have a tea party. Jesse and Joey do their radio show from underwater in a diving bell. However, Joey is afraid to go back up when he sees a shark, which causes Jesse to miss his picnic with Becky. Much to Stephanie's annoyance, Michelle, after running away, gets in trouble but still gets to have her tea party. When they go see the Indiana Jones Epic Stunt Spectacular!, Danny reveals that he's found the perfect way to propose to Vicky. After the show, Stephanie asks to go back to the hotel because she is tired. Stephanie also says under her breath that her day wasn't as big as Michelle's and Michelle hears this. While D.J. and Kimmy are at the hotel, they see Steve there checking in and says he could not stand to be away from D.J. Michelle does the right thing and uses her third wish to give Stephanie her "Princess of the Day" title. Because of this unselfish deed, the whole family gets to be in the parade, and they all ride on different floats. Stephanie and Michelle get to ride on a float with Cinderella and Snow White. At the end of the night, they all then go to Jesse's concert at Cinderella Castle, and he dedicates "A Dream Is a Wish Your Heart Makes" to Becky. During the fireworks display, one reads "VICKY, WILL YOU MARRY ME?" and Vicky says "yes".

== See also ==
- List of Full House episodes
