= My Left Foot (disambiguation) =

My Left Foot is a 1989 drama film about Irish writer Christy Brown.

My Left Foot may also refer to:

- My Left Foot (book), an autobiography by Christy Brown

== See also ==
- "My Other Left Foot" (NCIS), a season 1 episode of NCIS: Washington TV series spin-off of JAG (TV series)
- "My Left and Right Foot", a season 8 episode of Full House
