= Radio Days (disambiguation) =

Radio Days is a 1987 film directed by Woody Allen.

Radio Days may also refer to:

- "Radio Days" (Full House)
- "Radio Days" (Roseanne)
- Radio Dayz, 2008 South Korean film
