= List of Full House and Fuller House characters =

Main cast in season seven

The American television sitcom, Full House, ran for eight seasons on ABC from September 22, 1987, to May 23, 1995. Its sequel series Fuller House followed 21 years later, airing on Netflix, ran for five seasons. beginning February 26, 2016, ending on June 2, 2020.

== Main characters ==
Character	Portrayed by	Full House								Fuller House				
Character	Portrayed by	Season 1	Season 2	Season 3	Season 4	Season 5	Season 6	Season 7	Season 8	Season 1	Season 2	Season 3	Season 4	Season 5
Jesse Katsopolis (Note: "Jesse Cochran" in Season 1.)	John Stamos	Main	Main	Main	Main	Main	Main	Main	Main	Recurring	Recurring	Recurring	Special Guest	Recurring
Danny Tanner	Bob Saget	Main	Main	Main	Main	Main	Main	Main	Main	Special Guest	Recurring	Recurring	Recurring	Recurring
Joey Gladstone	Dave Coulier	Main	Main	Main	Main	Main	Main	Main	Main	Recurring	Recurring	Recurring	Recurring	Recurring
D. J. Tanner	Candace Cameron	Main	Main	Main	Main	Main	Main	Main	Main	Main	Main	Main	Main	Main
Stephanie Tanner	Jodie Sweetin	Main	Main	Main	Main	Main	Main	Main	Main	Main	Main	Main	Main	Main
Michelle Tanner	Mary-Kate & Ashley Olsen	Recurring	Main	Main	Main	Main	Main	Main	Main					
Rebecca Donaldson Katsopolis	Lori Loughlin		Recurring	Main (Note: Loughlin is only credited in the episodes she appears in the third season.)	Main	Main	Main	Main	Main	Recurring	Recurring	Recurring	Recurring	
Kimmy Gibbler	Andrea Barber	Recurring	Recurring	Recurring	Recurring	Main	Main	Main	Main	Main	Main	Main	Main	Main
Steve Hale (Note: "Steve Peters" during Season 5.)	Scott Weinger					Guest	Main	Main	Guest	Recurring	Main (Note: In the sixth episode of the second season, Weinger is credited as a special guest star but is credited as starring in the other episodes he appears in.) (Note: Weinger, Brotherton, Liao and Hagenbuch are only credited after the opening sequence and in the episodes they appear in.)	Main	Main	Main
Nicky and Alex Katsopolis	Blake and Dylan Tuomy-Wilhoit (Note: Daniel and Kevin Renteria in Season 5.)					Recurring	Main	Main	Main	Special Guest	Special Guest			
Jackson Fuller	Michael Campion									Main	Main	Main	Main	Main
Max Fuller	Elias Harger									Main	Main	Main	Main	Main
Ramona Gibbler	Soni Nicole Bringas									Main	Main	Main	Main	Main
Tommy Fuller	Dashiell & Fox Messitt									Main	Main	Main	Main	Main
Fernando Hernandez-Guerrero	Juan Pablo Di Pace									Recurring	Main	Main	Main	Main
Matt Harmon	John Brotherton									Recurring	Main	Main	Main	Main
Lola Wong	Ashley Liao									Recurring	Main	Guest		Guest
Jimmy Gibbler	Adam Hagenbuch										Recurring	Main	Main	Main

=== Introduced in Full House ===
==== Jesse Katsopolis ====
Jesse Katsopolis (portrayed by John Stamos) is Danny's brother-in-law, Pam's younger brother, making him the maternal uncle to D. J., Stephanie, and Michelle. Later in the series, he marries Rebecca Donaldson, Danny's co-host on Wake Up, San Francisco, with whom he has twin sons Nicholas and Alexander, better known as Nicky and Alex. The character underwent several name changes throughout the series' development and filming. He was originally named Adam Cochran during production, though this was ultimately changed to Jesse, at Stamos' request. Later, producers changed his last name from Cochran to one of Greek origin, to Katsopolis, also at the request of Stamos, who is Greek American. Finally, in the fifth season, it is revealed that Jesse was originally named Hermes after his great-grandfather, but his mother changed it to Jesse at his request after he entered primary school, when his peers bullied him for his name.

In contrast with Danny, Jesse is portrayed as irresponsible most of the time, but occasionally serves as a responsible adult when one is needed (such as when he learns that Stephanie's classmate is a child abuse victim in the season six episode "Silence is Not Golden"). Jesse is revealed to be high school dropout in season six's "Educating Jesse", though in an earlier plot (in season four's "One Last Kiss") about a high school reunion, he mentions not wearing his cap to graduation because he did not want to mess up his hair.

Jesse's obsession with his hair becomes a major trait throughout the series. He is a die hard Elvis Presley fan and Elvis was his inspiration to be a musician. His obsession with Elvis is fully established in the season two premiere "Cutting it Close", which focuses on Jesse's tough time coping when Stephanie accidentally cuts off a hunk of his mullet, which leads to him getting into a motorcycle accident that lands him in a full arm cast; later episodes reveal that he has a special comb called Mr. Goodpart (which gets damaged in a melee to purchase a Mighty Mutant Super Kids Super Fortress for Michelle in season eight's "I've Got a Secret") and that he gives pep talks to his hair (as revealed in season seven's "Wrong-Way Tanner").

Jesse moves into the house with virtually no experience in taking care of young children or babies, but learns the ropes along the way. He was only going to be here temporarily but ended up staying full time. He becomes closer to all of his nieces over the course of the series, especially Michelle, whom he affectionately nicknames "munchkin" and "shorty", among others. In the first season, Jesse works for his father Nick's exterminating business before leaving to pursue work in advertising, frequently working with Joey. He later works with Joey as co-host of an afternoon drive time show on local radio station KFLH called The Rush Hour Renegades.

Further along in the series, in season seven's "Smash Club: The Next Generation", Jesse becomes the new owner of The Smash Club. Although he was depicted as a sports fan as well as a good athlete in the earlier seasons, it is revealed in later seasons that Jesse hated all sports (especially basketball, in "Air Jesse" from season eight) and was not very athletic. Jesse's main passion is music, and struggles to "hit it big" with his band, Jesse and the Rippers (in the earlier part of the series). However, his increasing responsibilities to his family, radio job, and as owner of a club, lead his band members to kick him out of the band in the season eight premiere "Comet's Excellent Adventure".

In "Making Out is Hard to Do", he decides to quit being a musician until he has a nightmare in which he appears on Downbeat (a Behind the Music-style show-within-a-dream-sequence) where he dreams that his family hates him, Rebecca has divorced him (and moved on with Joey) and Jesse himself was a mechanic, as well as overweight and balding (because of a scalp infection), with Kimmy Gibbler (dressed in the attire of the Married... with Children character Peggy Bundy) as a wife. Two episodes later in "To Joey, With Love", he starts a new band called Hot Daddy and the Monkey Puppets.

In Fuller House, Jesse, Becky, and Danny all move to Los Angeles. Jesse becomes the music composer for General Hospital while Becky and Danny start a new nationally syndicated talk show called, Wake Up USA. Stephanie is similar to her Uncle Jesse and decided to help D. J. take care of her nephews like her Uncle Jesse did for them. In the season two finale, Jesse and Becky adopt a baby girl whom they name Pamela after his sister. Somewhere along the line, Jesse became a stay at home dad. When Becky and Danny get fired from Wake Up USA, they try to get their old jobs back but the station only wanted her back to co-host an all women's talk show. Jesse, Becky, and Pamela are all moving back to San Francisco, and he also bought back the Smash Club (which is now a laundromat) along with Joey.

==== Danny Tanner ====
Daniel "Danny" Tanner (portrayed by Bob Saget, John Posey in the unaired pilot) is left with three young daughters to raise after his wife, Pam, dies in a car accident caused by a drunk driver. At the beginning of the series, he works as a sportscaster for Channel 8 News. In the season two episode "Tanner vs. Gibbler", he is chosen by his station's general manager Mr. Strowbridge to be the co-host for the station's new morning talk show, Wake Up, San Francisco, alongside Rebecca Donaldson. In season one's "The Big Three-O", Danny's beloved car, "Bullet", is severely damaged after another driver rear-ends the vehicle, leading it roll out of park and become submerged in the San Francisco Bay while Jesse and Joey shop for new seat covers for the car to surprise Danny with as a present for his 30th birthday. Jesse and Joey end up bidding for a new car that is identical in appearance, unknowingly competing with Danny, who purchases the car (and later named it "Walter") after he calls the car dealership that Jesse and Joey are at, and places a bid over the phone.

Danny goes on his first date since Pam's death in the season one episode "Sea Cruise", as part of a fishing trip that was intended to only include himself, Jesse and Joey. He is seen going out on dates on occasion throughout the series. While Rebecca goes on maternity leave in season five just before giving birth to his nephews Nicky and Alex, Danny ends up falling in love with her co-host replacement, Vicky Larson. The two of them begin dating in season five's "Easy Rider", becoming Danny's most serious relationship since he became a widower, and the two later become engaged in the season six finale "The House Meets the Mouse".

However, their relationship changes to long-distance when Vicky is assigned reporting jobs away from San Francisco. In season seven's "The Perfect Couple", Vicky ends up getting her dream job of anchoring the network news in New York City, but a long-distance relationship does not work for either of them. Danny decides to break up with her, leading him to a mass feng shui habit in the next episode, "Is It True About Stephanie?", which his family acknowledges is his way of trying to cope with his breakup. Danny eventually meets fellow single parent Claire Mahan in season eight episode "Making Out Is Hard to Do", and they go on a date in the episode "Claire and Present Danger".

Although he is not established with this trait early on (season one's "The Return of Grandma" depicts him as begrudgingly trying to clean the messy house with Jesse and Joey after their mothers threaten to move in if they cannot keep the place clean), much of the humor surrounding Danny's character comes from his obsession with cleaning and cleanliness. Danny can often be found cleaning for cleaning's sake, sometimes even cleaning his cleaning products. In a version of the season three opening titles, seen during episodes in which Lori Loughlin does not appear as Rebecca Donaldson, Danny is shown to be cleaning his vacuum cleaner with a handheld vacuum. He says the family motto is "clean is good, dirt is bad". Danny views spring cleaning as his equivalent to Christmas and home movies as his New Year's Eve (as revealed in the season two episode "Goodbye, Mr. Bear"). His quirkiness and generally "unhip dad" personality are targets for humor. He is a skilled pool player, darts player, and guitarist (revealed respectively in season four's "Girls Just Wanna Have Fun" and season eight's "To Joey, with Love").

Like most other characters, he generally cannot stand Kimmy Gibbler, considering her as "an annoying, obnoxious nuisance"; at times, urging D. J. to make new friends whenever Kimmy does something that irritates him. Danny also has one brother and one sister, and his parents are divorced. Unlike his brother-in-law Jesse (who is more into rock-and-roll), Danny has a taste for 1970s disco music; one of his favorite songs is "Play That Funky Music" by Wild Cherry.

In the first episode of Fuller House, Danny and Becky relocate to Los Angeles for their new talk show, Wake Up USA, and it is revealed that Danny got remarried to a woman named Teri. During the second season, Danny goes through a minor midlife crisis, having just turned 60. In season three, Danny reveals that he and Teri got divorced. Danny and Becky ask for raises, but since they demand too much, they are fired and replaced by Mario Lopez. After feeling sorry for themselves, they go back to Wake Up San Francisco to ask for their old jobs back, but the station only wants Becky back.

To cheer him up, the girls somehow track down Vicky and surprise him with a visit from her. He invites her to the 30th "Dadi-versary" party the girls threw for him, Jesse, and Joey. Since Becky, Jesse, and Joey are all moving back to San Francisco, Danny announces he's moving back too, and back into the house.

In season four, Becky's talk show The Gab is a success, but it reverts back to Wake Up San Francisco. Danny refuses to audition to be her co-host, briefly living life as a retiree. He eventually realizes that he misses being on air and gets his old job back after Becky's co-host is injured.

==== Joey Gladstone ====
Joseph "Joey" Gladstone (portrayed by Dave Coulier) is the childhood best friend of Danny Tanner, and adulthood best friend of Jesse Katsopolis. Joey moved in with Danny shortly after the death of Danny's wife, Pam, to help raise D. J., Stephanie, and Michelle. Joey works as a stand-up comedian, whose act usually includes vocal imitations of cartoon characters such as Popeye, Bullwinkle J. Moose, Pepé Le Pew, and others. Joey initially slept in the alcove of Danny's living room.

However, after complaining of not being able to find privacy, Danny reconstructs his basement garage into a bedroom for him in the season one episode "Joey's Place" (prior to the reveal, Joey contemplates moving out after the family's behavior makes him believe that Jesse and Danny can handle taking care of the girls and that he is not needed). Joey nearly quits comedy in the season one episode "But Seriously, Folks", after Phyllis Diller (who was there as an audience member) hogs his slot at a comedy club, deciding to change his name to Joe and become a serious businessman.

He reverses his decision after D. J. decides to quit practicing the guitar, realizing that he is not setting a good example. Although there was some tension between Joey and Jesse when they first move in with the Tanners, they quickly become good friends to the point where Jesse asks Joey to be his best man at his wedding. Even so, Joey's perceived immaturity does irritate Jesse at times. Joey usually handles the day-to-day raising of the kids by doing chores like making meals, driving the kids to school appointments, and after school activities, taking care of Michelle as a baby, and helping the kids with their homework.

Joey buys D. J. her first car for her 16th birthday in the season six episode "Grand Gift Auto", which ends up getting repossessed after the police discover that the car had been stolen. Joey nearly moves out again after the family's attempts to try to prove that Joey is not capable of committing a crime make him believe that the rest of the family thinks of him as a big joke. It is in this episode that Joey reveals that he had wished he had siblings. He grew up as an only child (even imagining that he was part of The Brady Bunch), and being part of the Tanner family gave him the extended family he always wanted.

In season four's "Viva Las Joey", Joey is reunited with his estranged father (arranged by Stephanie and D. J.), a former serviceman in the United States Army, with whom Joey did not get along with growing up due to his strict parenting style and his disapproval of Joey's dream of being a comedian. His father realizes that Joey made the right career decision when he sees him perform as an opening act for Wayne Newton in Las Vegas.

Joey has held various jobs in addition to his work as a stand-up comic. For a while during seasons two and three, Joey and Jesse run an advertising business, J&J Creative Services, in which they compose jingles for television and radio commercials. In season four's "Joey Goes Hollywood", Joey wins a role he secretly auditions for in a sitcom co-starring Frankie Avalon and Annette Funicello called Surf's Up. Joey's most successful job was portraying "Ranger Joe", on an afternoon children's variety television show.

He was asked to replace retiring original host "Ranger Roy" in season five's "The Legend of Ranger Joe", only to be fired after triggering Roy's acute physical paranoia when hugging him as a thank you. After Danny informs Joey of this while telling him of his firing, Joey ends up saving Roy from a "hug-o-gram" that he had sent in gratitude for the job; he then gets rehired after Roy becomes impressed with Joey's hosting skills when he takes over for Roy on his last show. Ranger Joe's sidekick is his wise-cracking woodchuck marionette puppet "Mr. Woodchuck" (first seen in "The Legend of Ranger Joe" and last seen in "Michelle Rides Again").

Joey quits his job in season six's "Radio Days", after he becomes disgruntled with his boss Mr. Strowbridge's wife as his co-host. Jesse and Joey subsequently become co-hosts of a successful afternoon show on radio station KFLH called, Rush Hour Renegades. Besides his impressions, much of Joey's humor comes from his depiction as a man child, particularly the fact that he still watches cartoons as an adult and has an extensive knowledge of animation.

Joey has moved to Las Vegas in Fuller House and is now married with four kids that he refers to as the Gladstone Four. His wife Ginger (portrayed by Laura Bell Bundy) is a magician and their kids Phyllis (portrayed by Ruby Rose Turner), Lewis (portrayed by Finn Carr), Joan (portrayed by Kingston Foster), and Jerry (portrayed by Noah Salsbury Lipson) are very loud and obnoxious where they cause problems for Jackson, Max, Ramona, and even D. J., Stephanie, and Kimmy. After botching the advice about his kids at the time when Joey was attending Thanksgiving, Kimmy was able to get it right during the Gladstone Four's next visit where Joey finally got them to behave or else they won't be going to Disneyland. Joey and the Gladstone Four move back to San Francisco since his wife will be working as a magician on a cruise ship for six months. He also bought back the Smash Club with Jesse.

==== D. J. Tanner ====
Donna Jo "D. J." Tanner (portrayed by Candace Cameron) is Danny and Pam's oldest child. Over the course of the show's run, D. J. attends Frasier Street Elementary, Van Atta Junior High and Bayview High School. In the pilot episode "Our Very First Show", she ends up having to share her bedroom with Stephanie in order to allow Jesse to move into Stephanie's old bedroom; due to problems with privacy regarding Stephanie, in the season five episode "Take My Sister, Please", she sells Danny on an idea to switch rooms with Michelle, who in turn would move in with Stephanie (only after convincing Michelle to move in with Stephanie, after she rejects the offer to move in with her older sister).

D. J. is typically the daughter who acts the most practical, often giving advice to her younger sisters, Michelle and Stephanie. Although she sometimes bickers with them, she cares for them deeply. Even though she is sweet and kind at times, she can be rebellious, out of control, and disrespectful. These traits emerge when, for example, rumors spread that she is the worst kisser in the school ("Oh Where, Oh Where Has My Little Girl Gone); when she storms out of the house after Danny forbids her to see Steve due to her neglect of homework and other responsibilities; when Danny provokes Steve to break up with D. J. at school; when Danny wrestles Steve ("Lovers And Other Tanners"); and when she runs away a second time after Danny tells her he won't lend her his car keys to go see Viper, to which she responds by taking Kimmy's car instead ("On The Road Again").

As D. J. enters middle school, she deals with issues like puberty and dating. She has her first serious relationship with Steve Hale (introduced in the season five episode "Sisters in Crime"), who later becomes a fixture in her life (and a regular character beginning in season six) when their characters return from a summer abroad in Spain.

Their relationship lasts until they break up in the season seven episode "Love on the Rocks", when they realize that the passion in their relationship is gone, but they agree to remain friends. D. J. has on-and-off relationships (during the show's final season) with guitarist Viper (a member of Jesse's new band Hot Daddy and the Monkey Puppets) and rich kid Nelson, but neither relationship lasts. The two vie for D. J.'s affections in the season eight episode "D. J.'s Choice", only for D. J. to reject them both after their fighting becomes too much to bear.

In the series finale "Michelle Rides Again", Steve shows up at the Tanner house to take D. J. to her senior prom and they share a kiss. Her best friend throughout the show, next-door neighbor Kimmy Gibbler, is the complete opposite of D. J. in every way. In season eight, D. J. gets accepted to University of California, Berkeley, and it is implied she will attend there after graduating high school, having been rejected from her first choice, Stanford University.

In Fuller House, D. J. is a recent widow and mother of three sons, Jackson, Max, and Tommy Jr. after her firefighter husband Tommy Sr. dies in the line of duty; she lives with Stephanie and Kimmy. D. J. is similar to her father Danny and becomes head of the household and her sister Stephanie and childhood best friend Kimmy helped look after her sons and Kimmy's daughter. D. J. has since become a veterinarian. When her boss retires, his son, Matt Harmon, and D. J. take over the pet clinic. Matt and Steve fight for D. J.'s affection, but both end up dating other people after D. J. says she's not ready to commit someone new yet. Realizing they have feelings for each other, Matt breaks up with his girlfriend and starts dating D. J. On the way to Steve's wedding in Japan, D. J., wearing a sleeping mask – and thinking she's talking to Kimmy – unknowingly tells Steve that she is going to pick him over Matt, and she feels like she's losing her soulmate.

Steve tells Kimmy about D. J.'s confession and his intention to confront D. J. but changes his mind after he witnesses Matt proposing to D. J. The next day, before the wedding starts, Kimmy tells D. J. that Steve was the one who heard what she said on the plane. At the altar, Steve calls off the wedding, and D. J. breaks her engagement to Matt. Back home, the two decide to wait a month before they start dating, out of respect to their exes. After their "third, first date", Steve tells D. J. that the Los Angeles Lakers want him to be the team's foot specialist. He chooses to stay with her, but D. J. calls the team and says that he will take the job. After a few months Steve quits his job so that he can date D. J.. Steve proposes to D. J. in season five, and get married in the series finale in a triple wedding with Stephanie and Jimmy, Kimmy, and Fernando.

==== Stephanie Tanner ====
Stephanie Tanner (portrayed by Jodie Sweetin) is the witty, sarcastic middle child of Danny and Pam, the younger sister of D. J., and the older sister of Michelle. Her mother died when she was five years old. Her catchphrases during the first six seasons of the series include "how rude!", "well, pin a rose on your nose!", and "hot dog". She eventually evolved into something of a tomboy in seasons four and five. Stephanie has a habit of spying on D.J.'s life by reading her diary and eavesdropping on her telephone calls (having been caught in the act several times), and is generally the most athletic and nosiest of the Tanner girls.

Her best friends in school are Gia Mahan and Mickey, whom she meets in season seven (the former is the only one who appears through to season eight). Of the three sisters, Stephanie has dealt with the toughest issues, such as peer pressure into smoking (in season seven's "Fast Friends"), "make-out" parties (in season eight's "Making Out is Hard to Do"), joyriding (in season eight's "Stephanie's Wild Ride"), and uncovering a classmate's child abuse (in season six's "Silence is Not Golden"), as well as the death of her mother when she was only five. In her early years, she is very sentimental about Mr. Bear, a stuffed animal that her mother gave to her after Michelle was born (this was the focal point of the season two episode "Goodbye Mr. Bear"). She and Jesse are the most abrasive when it comes to how they feel about Kimmy Gibbler.

In Fuller House, Stephanie volunteers to give up her life in London to move back into her childhood home to help take care of her sister's three kids. Kimmy volunteers to move in as well much to Stephanie's dismay but she soon puts her abrasive feelings aside, and becomes friends with her. Stephanie confesses to D. J. that she can't have kids but wants to. Stephanie starts a relationship with Kimmy's younger brother Jimmy. Becky schedules Stephanie for a pelvic exam and turns out she has three viable eggs and can have a baby via surrogacy.

Since she hasn't been dating Jimmy for that long, she doesn't want to put pressure on him for being the father, and throwing him into a lifelong commitment so soon in their relationship. He wants to be the father. They are able to make embryos and Kimmy volunteers to be the surrogate mother. Kimmy is able to get pregnant with the embryos. At the end of season four Kimmy gives birth to a baby girl, and Jimmy proposes to Stephanie which she accepts. Stephanie names the baby Danielle "Danni" Jo, named after her dad and D. J. Stephanie and Jimmy get married in the series finale in a triple wedding with D. J. and Steve, Kimmy, and Fernando. The day after the wedding Stephanie reveals to D. J. and Kimmy that she is pregnant.

==== Michelle Tanner ====
Michelle Tanner (portrayed by twins Mary-Kate Olsen and Ashley Olsen), is Danny and Pam's youngest daughter. Danny is more overprotective of Michelle than the other girls. Michelle was just a baby when Pam died, so she hardly remembers Pam. Jesse and Joey's misadventures in taking care of her when she was a baby provided a great deal of humor. Once Michelle started to grow up, she became the focus of more of the show's storylines. Her best friends, Teddy and Denise, appear frequently in later seasons.

She also has other friends, such as Derek Boyd, Lisa Leeper, and bossy Aaron Bailey, who Michelle has an uneasy friendship with. Her favorite toys (in earlier seasons) are Barney, a plush bear who hangs on the wall above her bed, and her stuffed pig. It is apparent that Jesse is somewhat closer to her than her sisters, and he gives her nicknames such as "munchkin", "shorty" and "rugrat". She is known for her many recurring catchphrases such as "you got it, dude!", "you're in big trouble, mister!", "oh, puh-lease!", "aw, nuts!", "duh!", and "no way, José!"

Michelle does not appear in Fuller House. Characters mention that she is now living in New York and owns a fashion company—a reference to the Olsen twins' then-current occupation and location—while looking directly into the camera.

==== Rebecca Donaldson-Katsopolis ====
Rebecca "Becky" Donaldson-Katsopolis (portrayed by Lori Loughlin) is a sarcastic, practical, but very loving and well-educated woman who becomes the love interest and later wife of Jesse Katsopolis. Becky was born in Valentine, Nebraska and decided to pursue journalism as a career while in high school. Becky moves to San Francisco to become the co-host of Wake Up, San Francisco, being paired with Danny as her co-host; the two become close friends, although she often quips about Danny's quirks and tendency to ramble in his conversations. Reluctant to admit her feelings for Jesse, she initially resists his advances but eventually falls in love with him. The two almost elope in Lake Tahoe in the season two finale "Luck Be a Lady", but back out when Becky realizes that she and Jesse are not really ready to get married. They eventually get married (in the second part of the season four episode "The Wedding") on Valentine's Day.

After Jesse has a bittersweet farewell to the rest of the family when he decides to move into Rebecca's apartment in the season four episode "Fuller House", Rebecca agrees to move in with the Tanners and Joey when she discovers how much Jesse misses them, living together in the attic (which Jesse and Joey have converted into an apartment). Becky helps to transform Jesse, although she still teases him about his obsession with his hair and love of Elvis.

She also serves as a mother figure to the girls at times; most prominently giving advice to D. J. as she becomes a teenager. Becky gives birth to twin boys Nicholas and Alexander on Michelle's fifth birthday in part two of the season five episode "Happy Birthday, Babies". She and Jesse name Alexander after a teacher who inspired her to become a journalist and Nicholas after Jesse's father. Becky is offered a producer role on Wake Up, San Francisco in the season eight episode "The Producer", which results in Danny briefly quitting the show due to him being passed over for such a promotion.

In Fuller House, she, Jesse, and Danny all move to Los Angeles to start their new jobs. She and Danny now host a nationally syndicated talk show called, Wake Up USA. Becky gets baby fever when around D. J.'s youngest son, Tommy. She and Jesse end up adopting a baby girl whom they name Pamela. Becky and Danny get fired from Wake Up USA when they ask for too much money. They ask for their old jobs back at Wake Up San Francisco but the station wants only her back. They want her to host an all-women's talk show called The Gab. She, Jesse and Pamela move back to San Francisco. The Gab is a hit but turns back into Wake Up San Francisco. When the show starts back up Danny refuses to audition to be her co-host, which results in her being stuck with a Neanderthal co-host, but not long after he is able to get his old job back.

==== Kimmy Gibbler ====
Kimmy Gibbler (portrayed by Andrea Barber, recurring since season one and upgraded to a series regular in season five) is D. J.'s best friend and the Tanners' annoying but well-meaning next-door neighbor. Kimmy and D. J. have been best friends since the Gibblers moved next door to the Tanners, despite their differing personalities; the two have temporarily ended their friendship multiple times during the show's run due to disputes over various situations, but always end up reconciling and forgiving each other. Most of the Tanner family cannot stand her (Danny, Stephanie and Jesse are especially annoyed by her, with Stephanie often making jabs at her lack of intelligence and other unusual quirks and Danny urging D. J. to make new friends and often asking Kimmy to leave the house).

She is often known to be a poor student in school, and had copied D. J.'s homework during most of the early seasons. Kimmy is the subject of a recurring gag in the series, regarding her terrible foot odor, which becomes noticeable to other people mainly once she removes her shoes; Kimmy also becomes aware of this in a scene in the season seven episode "The Apartment" in which she accidentally grabs one of her shoes while searching for her phone when Danny calls her to find out the whereabouts of D. J. (who had fallen asleep on her boyfriend Steve's couch while watching a movie in his apartment). She is also known to be addicted to shopping.

In the episode "Another Opening, Another No Show", Jesse and Kimmy get locked in a closet on the night of the grand re-opening of The Smash Club, after the door handle breaks off in Jesse's hand; while there, Kimmy finally tells Jesse how much it hurts when he and the other Tanners (except for D. J.) pick on her. He finally tries to stop picking on her and tells the Tanners to try to go easy on her. However, their behavior towards her remains the same in later episodes, although she never seems to mind it anymore.

Kimmy's only serious relationship is with Duane (who is introduced in season eight episode "Taking the Plunge"), a very air-headed boy who was only known to say "whatever". Ironically, he was shown to have a fondness for Shakespearean works as he passionately quoted a line from Shakespeare's 18th sonnet. In "Taking the Plunge", Kimmy decides to run off to Reno and elope with Duane after she was rejected by the colleges that she had applied to, and is afraid that D. J. will go off to school and forget her. When D. J., Jesse, and Danny arrive at the chapel to stop her from getting married too young, D. J. tells her that she will always be her best friend no matter what. In the two-part series finale "Michelle Rides Again", she tries to find D. J. a blind date for prom and ends up surprising her with her ex-boyfriend Steve instead.

Sometime after high school Kimmy married a race car driver named Fernando, and had a daughter named Ramona. In the Fuller House sequel series, she gets separated from Fernando, then she and Ramona move into the Tanner family home after D. J.'s husband died. She moved in to help her along with Stephanie. Kimmy starts a party planning business called Gibbler Style. Kimmy volunteers to be Stephanie and Jimmy's surrogate (as Stephanie was not able to get pregnant). At the end of season four, Kimmy gives birth to Stephanie and Jimmy's baby girl. Kimmy and Fernando get remarried in the series finale in a triple wedding with D. J. and Steve, Stephanie and Jimmy.

==== Steve Hale ====
Steve Hale (portrayed by Scott Weinger) is D. J.'s first steady boyfriend. In the season five episode "Sisters in Crime", Weinger first guest-stars as Steve Peters, who is D. J.'s date to a movie that she ends up taking Michelle and Stephanie to. Weinger returns to the series as a regular character in the season six premiere "Come Fly With Me", in which D. J. introduces him to her family as Steve Hale (establishing Weinger's previous role of "Steve Peters" to have been a separate character). Steve is two years older than D. J. and is a star member of the high school wrestling team. He is known for having a healthy appetite, and often eats at the Tanners' when he visits.

In "A Very Tanner Christmas", Steve receives an acceptance letter to Daytona Beach University in Florida, which causes he and D. J. to briefly break up due to D. J.'s concern that she would miss him. But Steve decides to go to a local community college in order to improve his grades and continue his relationship with D. J. In the season six episode "Prom Night", both he and D. J. attend Steve's prom where he is elected prom king (and his ex-girlfriend—whose affections he rejects—is named prom queen). Steve and D. J. break up in the season seven episode "Love on the Rocks", after they realize that their relationship was not as passionate as it used to be, but they decide to remain friends. In the series finale, when D. J. needs a date for her senior prom, Kimmy surprises her and gets Steve to be her date.

After college, Steve becomes a podiatrist. In Fuller House, Steve is a divorcee and his ex took half of what he's worth. With him and D. J. both now single, he tries to start a relationship with her again, but D. J. is initially hesitant. He then competes for her affections with her handsome coworker Matt Harmon. But after D. J. decides that she is ultimately not ready to have a serious relationship again, Steve and Matt feel dejected and eventually become buddies. In the second season, when D. J. finally decides which of the two she is going to date, she finds out that both Steve and Matt each already have girlfriends, Steve's being a woman named C.J. who is a lot like D. J. By the end of the season, Steve proposes to C.J. while D. J. and Matt are back together.

In the third season, when flying to Japan to attend Steve and C.J.'s wedding, D. J. accidentally confesses to Steve that she was going to pick him instead of Matt, and feels like she is losing her soulmate. She says this while thinking that Kimmy is sitting next to her on the plane when it was actually Steve. At the altar, he realizes he still loves D. J. and can't marry C.J. so he calls the wedding off. Likewise, D. J. still has feelings for Steve and breaks up with Matt. A month after the almost wedding, D. J. and Steve finally start dating again.

However, there is bad news for the reunited couple when the Lakers want Steve to be their foot specialist. He declines the job to stay with D. J., but she calls the team to say he will take the job. Steve tells her they will be back together in six months. In season four, after a few months on the job with the Lakers, Steve quits and moves back home so he can be with D. J. In season five, Steve, Jimmy, and Fernando all go in together to buy a local sandwich shop when the owner, Uncle Monty, retires. Steve finally proposes to D. J. and they get married in the series finale, along with Stephanie and Jimmy, and Kimmy and Fernando, in a triple wedding.

==== Nicky and Alex Katsopolis ====
Nicholas "Nicky" Katsopolis and Alexander "Alex" Katsopolis, (portrayed by Daniel and Kevin Renteria as babies during season five; Blake and Dylan Tuomy-Wilhoit for seasons 6–8 and Fuller House) are the twin sons of Jesse and Becky Katsopolis. The two were born in the season five episode "Happy Birthday, Babies", on the date of Michelle's fifth birthday. Becky named Alex after a high school teacher who inspired her to venture into a career in journalism, while Jesse chose to name Nicky after his father, for giving him great hair. They have strawberry-blond hair and are fun-loving toddlers, with minor distinctions between them. Nicky is more quiet and sweet, while Alex is more outspoken and mischievous. They often repeat each other's words.

In Fuller House, the twins are portrayed as dimwitted young adults who are strongly despised by their once-doting parents, who find them to be annoying and immature. However, they decide to run a fish taco food truck together upon completion of college. It's later mentioned by Kimmy, that they live in the food truck – much to Jesse's delight.

=== Introduced in Fuller House ===
==== Jackson Fuller ====
Jackson Fuller (portrayed by Michael Campion) is D. J.'s oldest son. When Kimmy and her daughter, Ramona, move in Jackson has to give up his room and move in with his brother Max. Jackson and Ramona don't get along at first but become like brother and sister. Jackson has shown to be a good older brother to Max and Tommy. Jackson likes to do stunts, and joins the football team to impress Ramona's friend, Lola. He likes to call himself "J. Money" and "Action Jackson". He briefly dates Lola, but she breaks up with him for being too clingy.

While attending summer school, he becomes friends with Gia's daughter Rocki, much to D. J.'s dislike. They eventually become a couple but at prom when his friends ask why he's with her, he pretends to say bad things about her to impress them but she overhears him in the photobooth and walks off. She breaks up with him but they eventually get back together. In the series finale, he tells her that he loves her. Jackson discovers he is good at kicking the football and becomes the star kicker on the football team. Jackson auditioned for a small part in the school play originally just to get out of gym class but discovered that he can sing, and gets the lead role instead.

==== Max Fuller ====
Max Fuller (portrayed by Elias Harger) is D. J.'s well dressed and intelligent middle child. He likes science, and is shown to be a clean freak like his grandfather. Max has rivalries with Kimmy's fiancé/ husband Fernando and classmate Taylor. Max's former girlfriend is Rose, the daughter of Steve's ex-fiancée C.J.

==== Ramona Gibbler ====
Ramona Gibbler (portrayed by Soni Nicole Bringas) is the daughter of Kimmy Gibbler and her ex-husband/fiancé/husband Fernando. She is not thrilled when she has to move into the Tanner family home and change schools. Ramona and Jackson had a bad history with each other, yet they have improved since Ramona moved in. Ramona quickly befriends one of the popular girls in school named Lola Wong and briefly dates Jackson's friend Bobby Popko. She is an aspiring dancer. Ramona later starts dating a boy named Ethan whom she met when he delivered for her.

==== Tommy Fuller ====
Tommy Fuller, Jr. (portrayed by Dashiell and Fox Messitt) is D. J.'s youngest son. Like his aunt Michelle, he also loses a parent as a baby, and is played by twins. He is after named his late father Tommy Fuller, Sr.

==== Fernando Hernandez-Guerrero-Fernandez-Guerrero ====
Fernando Hernandez-Guerrero-Fernandez-Guerrero (portrayed by Juan Pablo Di Pace), is Kimmy Gibbler's race car driving ex-husband/fiancé. At the start of Fuller House, he and Kimmy are separated due to his unfaithfulness to her. Fernando begins to miss her and tries to win her back. It works, but he ends up finally signing their divorce papers. He only does this to re-propose, which she accepts. Fernando retires from his racing career, and moves in. Ten months after moving in, he buys Kimmy's childhood home and moves in with her brother. In season five Fernando, Jimmy and Steve all go in to buy a local sandwich shop when the owner Uncle Monty retires. Fernando and Kimmy get remarried in the series finale.

==== Matt Harmon ====
Matt Harmon (portrayed by John Brotherton) is D. J.'s partner at the Harmon/Fuller Pet Care. He originally intended to fill in for his dad while he was away on a trip to India but decides to stay in San Francisco. When his dad retires he has Matt and D. J. take over the business. Matt and Steve fight for D. J.'s affection. They eventually begin dating. While in Japan for Steve and C.J's wedding, Matt proposes to D. J. and she says yes. The next day at the wedding Steve calls off his wedding, and D. J. breaks off her engagement. A heartbroken Matt walks off.

He goes on an eight-day vacation and when he comes back to work he tells D. J. he doesn't know how he able to work with her if they're not together anymore. He takes some time off to think, and when he returns he tells her that he will be opening up a new pet clinic two blocks down. He opens his new clinic and tries to sabotage her business as a way to hurt her like she did him. His clinic doesn't last long when him and D. J. realize they work better together as partners. Matt eventually starts dating Gia much to D. J.'s annoyance. In season five the two eloped while in Las Vegas. Before becoming a veterinary doctor Matt used to be an underwear model.

==== Lola Wong ====
Lola Wong (portrayed by Ashley Liao) is a popular girl who is Ramona's best friend and Jackson's ex-girlfriend. After her father gets a job in Fresno she moves.

==== Jimmy Gibbler ====
Jimmy Gibbler (portrayed by Adam Hagenbuch) is Kimmy's younger brother. One day, he walks into the family's backyard and hears Stephanie singing. The two end up kissing, and are interrupted by Kimmy who informs Stephanie that he is her brother. Jimmy and Stephanie begin dating. When Stephanie gets the news that she can have a baby via surrogacy, she thinks it's too soon in their relationship to ask him to be the father. After finding that out from Kimmy, he tells her that he wants to be her baby's father. Kimmy volunteers to be his and Stephanie's surrogate.

In the season four finale Kimmy gives birth to their baby girl, Danielle. In season five Steve, Jimmy, and Fernando all go in to buy a local sandwich shop when the owner Uncle Monty retires. Jimmy and Stephanie get married in the series finale, and the two are expecting their second child together.

== Recurring characters ==
=== Introduced in Full House ===
==== Comet ====
Comet (portrayed by Buddy) is a golden retriever who is a pet of the Tanner family. He first appeared in "And They Call it Puppy Love" where his mother Minnie got into the Tanner family's backyard where she had her puppies. Out of the puppies, Comet was the one that the Tanner family kept.

==== Vicky Larson ====
Vicky Larson (portrayed by Gail Edwards) is Danny's girlfriend during seasons five and six and was briefly his fiancée from the season six episode "The House Meets the Mouse" until halfway through season seven. Vicky is very focused on her career, which proves to be the undoing in her long-distance relationship with Danny. They meet in season five's "Nicky and/or Alexander", when Vicky fills in for Becky (who is on maternity leave) on Wake Up, San Francisco, and start dating two episodes later in "Easy Rider". Later in season five's "Play It Again, Jesse", Danny insists that she take a news anchor job in Chicago that she was offered once Becky returns, and that starts a long-distance relationship (that goes from mid-season five to mid-season seven). Danny eventually proposes to her when she comes along on the family's vacation to Walt Disney World in "The House Meets the Mouse". However, Vicky later gets her dream job—anchoring the network news in New York City—in the season seven episode "The Perfect Couple" (the character's final appearance); as a result, she cannot come to live with Danny and his family in San Francisco, nor is Danny able to uproot his family in California. Therefore, to the dismay of themselves and Danny's family, they have a mutual breakup. Vicky often gives advice, such as helping D. J. with her relationship with Steve, and helping Danny to deal with it, and serves as a motherly figure to D. J., Stephanie, and Michelle. Vicky makes a brief appearance in the season three finale of Fuller House. D. J. and Stephanie apparently tracked her down to cheer up Danny. He invites her to the 30th "Dadiversary" party the girls threw for Danny, Joey, and Jesse. She later makes another appearance in the series finale where she attends the triple wedding and both she and Danny agree that they are glad to have stayed friends after all these years.

==== Nick Katsopolis ====
Nick Katsopolis (portrayed by John Aprea) is Jesse and Pam's father and maternal grandfather to D. J., Stephanie, and Michelle. He is an avid fan of Elvis Presley, just like Jesse. Also, like his son, he is very much interested in his hair and women (as he states in the season two episode "Our Very First Christmas Show", "there are two things Katsopolis men are known for: kissing and great hair"). Nick is the owner of an insect extermination business. He met his wife, Irene, the day that Elvis was drafted into the United States Army. Nick was a firm but caring parent. In the episode, "D. J.'s Day Off" it is mentioned that he would punish Jesse severely. This combination is also seen in the episode "It Is Not My Job", when Jesse quits the extermination business Nick responds with: "If you're out of the business, you're out of the family." Later on, he explains this by saying that he did not build up the business to sell it to a stranger. His love for his family is also shown by the fact that Irene bringing in Michelle curbed his anger. When Michelle was getting ready to do a television commercial for marshmallows in the season two episode "El Problema Grande de D. J.", he remarked that Michelle looked like a little blonde version of the redhead he likes on Gilligan's Island, which was revealed to be Tina Louise by Irene. In honor of inheriting Nick's hair, Jesse names one of his twin sons after him. Nicky and Alex never interact with their grandparents on-screen like the girls have, as Nick and Irene are last seen in season four. Nick re-appears in season three of Fuller House when he comes to take care of Tommy while everyone else goes to Japan for Steve's wedding. Nick mentions to Tommy about going out to find women, so it is assumed that he and Irene are no longer together or she is no longer living.

==== Irene Katsopolis ====
Irene Katsopolis (portrayed by Rhoda Gemignani in "The Return of Grandma", Yvonne Wilder in later appearances) is Jesse and Pam's mother, the wife of Nick Katsopolis, and maternal grandmother to D. J., Stephanie, and Michelle. She often talked about diapering Jesse's "tushy", and touched his and other people's "tushies", which made Jesse mad; at other times, she would talk about when Jesse was a kid. She often mentioned how she is older than Nick, and her passion for younger men (which makes Nick feel inferior at times).

==== Claire Tanner ====
Claire Tanner (portrayed by Alice Hirson in the first two appearances, Doris Roberts in the third appearance) is Danny's mother. She helped Danny raise the girls in the first few months after the death of Danny's wife, Pam, prior to Jesse and Joey moving into the house. She appeared in only three episodes: "Our Very First Show" and "The Return of Grandma", and in "Granny Tanny".

==== Teddy ====
Teddy (portrayed by Tahj Mowry) is Michelle's best friend. He first appeared in the season five premiere "Double Trouble", when Michelle meets him on their first day of kindergarten following the advice that Joey told Michelle that the best way to make new friends was by being funny, and does a Bullwinkle impression. He accompanies her when she needs a "date" to sneak out and join Danny on a date with Vicky in the season five episode "Bachelor of the Month". He is also the one whose house Michelle runs away to in "The Devil Made Me Do It" later that season (Tahj Mowry's real-life sisters Tia and Tamera Mowry appear in that episode in a dual role as Teddy's older sister). He moves to Amarillo, Texas in the season six episode "The Long Goodbye". Teddy returns in the season seven episode "Be Your Own Best Friend", when his father's job moves him back to San Francisco. He and Michelle even consider trying to be boyfriend and girlfriend in third grade in the season eight episode "Dateless in San Francisco", but find that it is no fun for children their age.

==== Denise Frazer ====
Denise Frazer (portrayed by Jurnee Smollett) is Michelle's best female friend, introduced in the season six episode "The Long Goodbye". She replaces Teddy as Michelle's best friend after Teddy moves to Texas. Denise, like Teddy before her, often gets Michelle into trouble. In the season seven episode "Be Your Own Best Friend", Teddy moves back to San Francisco, leaving Michelle to choose between him and Denise for whom to serve as her best friend. Danny makes her understand that it is possible to have more than one best friend. Michelle ultimately forms a trio of friends with Teddy and Denise at the end of that episode. In the season seven episode "Too Little Richard Too Late", it is revealed that Denise's uncle is Little Richard (who guest starred in the episode). Denise does not appear after that episode, having been written out without explanation due to Smollett's role in the short-lived ABC sitcom On Our Own (which aired during the 1994–95 season, concurring with the run of Full House's eighth and final season).

==== Aaron Bailey ====
Aaron Bailey (portrayed by Miko Hughes) is Michelle's recurring and longest running classmate. Introduced in the season three episode "Bye, Bye Birdie", he is the typical class bully, who tends to be annoying and rude at times. He pinches Michelle in the season four episode "A Pinch for a Pinch", which results in Jesse telling Michelle to fight back by pinching him in retaliation. When the teacher punishes them, Jesse takes Michelle home, pulling her out of preschool. While that behavior does not continue, his obnoxious ways continue throughout the series. In other episodes, he treats Jesse as either an equal or underlying rival. In addition, he also creates trouble for D. J. and Kimmy when they have boys over while Kimmy is babysitting in season four's "Girls Just Wanna Have Fun". Danny even remarks (in season seven) that they are watching Aaron for several days "until his regular babysitter stops twitching". He is sometimes seen being nice to Michelle.

==== Gia Mahan ====
Gia Mahan (portrayed by Marla Sokoloff) is Stephanie's archenemy (beginning with her first appearance in the season seven episode "Fast Friends") who later becomes her best friend (starting with the conclusion of "Is It True About Stephanie?" from that same season, but more prominently during season eight). She leads Stephanie into dangerous or not-so-smart situations. Stephanie gets involved in a few wild, irresponsible things because of Gia, such as going to a make-out party planned by her in the season eight episode "Making Out is Hard to Do", and (almost) smoking in "Fast Friends". Conversely, Stephanie was also a positive influence on Gia. During an unknown time when her parents had been through a divorce, Gia is shown as a cigarette-smoking, rebellious teen with horrible grades. She is two years older than Stephanie, as she was held back in school. Viewers learn (as of "Making Out is Hard to Do") that because of Stephanie, Gia has stopped smoking, became more respectful, improved her grades, and lost her inclination to play pranks on other people. Gia becomes the target of put downs at the hands of Michelle in much the same way as Kimmy is targeted by Stephanie. Over time, Michelle becomes quite creative with her insults. Gia reappears in season two of Fuller House when Kimmy gets the idea of getting their band "Girl Talk" back together. Things don't go well when Gia and D. J. have a hard time getting along. In season three, it was revealed that Gia has a daughter named Roxanne "Rocki" who is in summer school with Jackson. In season four she starts dating Matt much to D. J.'s annoyance. In season five they elope while in Las Vegas. Matt is her fourth husband.

==== Kathy Santoni ====
Kathy Santoni (portrayed by Anne Marie McEvoy) is a classmate of D. J.'s. While only appearing in four episodes (beginning with season three's "Back to School Blues"), Kathy Santoni is mentioned in several episodes by various characters. In the season seven episode "The Apartment", it is revealed that she got married and pregnant at age 16. Kathy shows up to her 20th high school reunion in Fuller House.

==== Harry Takayama ====
Harry Takayama (portrayed by Nathan Nishiguchi in Full House; Michael Sun Lee in Fuller House) is the first on-screen friend of Stephanie's (appearing in season two, beginning with the episode "Middle Age Crazy"). He usually calls her "Chief", and she refers to him as her boyfriend—without understanding that term's full meaning (as Stephanie put it in Harry's first appearance, "you're a boy, and you're my friend; that makes you my boyfriend"). Stephanie decides to have a pretend wedding with Harry in "Middle Age Crazy", feeling that she is not receiving attention from the rest of the family. His last appearance is in the season three episode "Nerd For a Day". In the episode "Pal Joey", Harry becomes infatuated with D. J. after she teaches him a mathematic problem using oranges. Over the years him and Stephanie stayed in touch, and she jokingly refers to him as her "husband". In Fuller House, when a thousand roses showed up to the house, Stephanie wonders if Harry sent them. Turns out he didn't send them and is actually getting married.

==== Derek S. Boyd ====
Derek S. Boyd (portrayed by Blake McIver Ewing) is one of Michelle's friends (appearing in eight episodes total throughout seasons six through eight). Michelle first meets Derek in the episode "The Play's the Thing", when he lands the role of Yankee Doodle in their school play, America the Beautiful. Though Michelle is initially jealous of Derek for winning the part over her (due in no small part to the fact that both of her sisters played Yankee Doodle in the same play), she helps him recover from a case of stage-fright, and they eventually become friends. Derek is very educated and well-spoken for a boy of his age, though also a bit on the wimpy side. He also shows signs of being a bit obsessive-compulsive. As shown in several episodes (including in his first appearance), he is also shown to be a very talented singer. In the scene in which he is first introduced, Derek says he blends in with his surroundings. Derek reappears in the series finale of Fuller House when Danny and Joey try to find someone to officiate the triple wedding.

==== Lisa Leeper ====
Lisa Leeper (portrayed by Kathryn Zaremba) is one of Michelle's friends (featured in six episodes during the eighth season, beginning with "I've Got a Secret"); in the episode "We Got the Beat", Lisa is shown to be an extremely good singer when she sings a duet of "Don't Go Breaking My Heart" with Derek.

==== Nelson Burkhardt ====
Nelson Burkhardt (portrayed by Jason Marsden in Full House, Hal Sparks in Fuller House) is a love interest for D. J. that is introduced in the season eight premiere "Comet's Excellent Adventure". Nelson is a teenager who comes from a very wealthy family, and dates D. J. on-and-off for some time (ironically, it is in his first appearance that D. J. breaks up with him; he ends up going on a date with Kimmy three episodes later in "I've Got a Secret"). Not much is revealed about Nelson's background or family, aside from the fact that he is very rich, and often throws and attends big parties on yachts. Though in "Taking the Plunge", he mentions that his cousin, Regina – with whom he sets Joey up on a date – is visiting the United States from England. Toward the latter stages of his "relationship" with D. J., in "D. J.'s Choice", he gets into a "tug-of-war" with Viper to be D. J.'s boyfriend, to which she declines both boys. Nelson shows up to his and D. J.'s 20th High School Reunion in season two of Fuller House.

==== Karen Penner ====
Karen Penner (portrayed by Debbie Gregory) is the aunt of one of Michelle's friends as well as one of Danny's girlfriends over the course of the show. She met Danny at Michelle's circus party in the season 3 episode "The Greatest Birthday on Earth", where he instantly fell for her, inviting her to stay for the party and also giving her a heart-shaped balloon. In "Lust in the Dust" Karen became Stephanie's dance teacher later in season three, and Danny started going out with her after the two kissed. They got along well until Danny found out she had trouble maintaining a clean apartment. He broke up with her because of that, but after talking it over with Jesse and Joey, he returned to her apartment to find that she had cleaned it (by shoving everything in the closet) and he apologized which led to them reconciling their relationship. They continued their relationship until sometime in either season 3 or early season 4. It is unknown when or how they broke up.

==== Cindy ====
Cindy (portrayed by Debra Sandlund) is a girlfriend of Danny's, appearing in three episodes during season four, beginning with the episode "Terror in Tanner Town". It is revealed that she works as a dry cleaner in that episode and she first met Danny when he comes to the store as a customer. Cindy also has a precocious and troublesome 10-year-old son named Rusty.

==== Rusty ====
Rusty (portrayed by Jordan Christopher Michael) is the son of Cindy, Danny's girlfriend in season four, first appearing in "Terror in Tanner Town". Rusty has a penchant of performing mischievous antics and practical jokes that wreak havoc on the family. It is also revealed that Cindy and his father have broken up. During a crazy prank that Rusty started in "Secret Admirer", he misunderstood D. J.'s words and believed that she was romantically interested in him. This caused him to develop a brief crush on her, but quickly got over it when the other members of the family caught on to his prank in which he sent a letter intended to D. J. (without signing his name on it) that ends up being circulated to the rest of the family as well as Kimmy and Cindy, resulting in everyone mistakenly believing that someone else in the group was interested in them. He was last seen in "Stephanie Plays the Field", training for baseball with Stephanie.

=== Introduced in Fuller House ===
==== Cosmo ====
In Fuller House, Steve's dog Comet Jr. Jr. (Comet's grand pup) has puppies and D. J. allows Max to pick a puppy. He names him Cosmo.

The dog actor that played Cosmo, also named Cosmo, died in December 2019, shortly after production on the series ended.

==== C.J. Harbenberger ====
C.J. Harbenberger (portrayed by Virginia Williams) is Steve's fiancée and mother to Max's friend, Rose. C.J. is strikingly similarly to D. J.

==== Bobby Popko ====
Bobby Popko (portrayed by Isaak Presley) is Jackson's best friend and Ramona's ex-boyfriend.

==== Taylor ====
Taylor (portrayed by Lucas Jaye) is Max's friend who challenges him.

==== Rose Harbenberger ====
Rose Harbenberger (portrayed by Mckenna Grace) is C.J.'s daughter, and Max's love interest.

==== Pamela Katsopolis II ====
Pamela Katsopolis II (portrayed by Madilynn Jefferson and McKenzie Jefferson) is the adoptive daughter of Jesse and Becky. She is named after Jesse's late sister Pamela Katsopolis Tanner.

==== Rocki Mahan ====
Roxanne "Rocki" Mahan (portrayed by Landry Bender) is Gia's daughter who attends summer school with Jackson and is Jackson's new love interest. They become a couple in the finale episode of season three but she breaks up with him in season four. They get back together in season five.

==== Danielle "Dani" Tanner-Gibbler ====
Danielle Jo "Dani" Tanner-Gibbler (portrayed by an unidentified toddler) is Stephanie and Jimmy's daughter.
