= Michael Campion (actor) =

American actor and magician

- Born: July 26, 2002 (age 24); Atlanta, Georgia, U.S.
- Occupation: Actor
- Years active: 2015–present
- Known for: Jackson Fuller in Fuller House

Michael Campion (born July 26, 2002) is an American actor and magician, best known for his performance as Jackson Fuller in the Netflix original series Fuller House.

== Early life and education ==
Michael Campion was raised in Orlando, Florida, where he trained in acting and performed in community theatre. As a teenager, his family relocated to Los Angeles, where he pursued being a child actor professionally.

== Career ==
Campion had his breakthrough role after being cast in the role of Jackson Fuller in the Netflix original series Fuller House at the age of thirteen. During the five seasons of the series, he played the titular family's mischievous teenage son.

== Personal life ==
Michael Campion was part of a popular YouTube creator group called Squad 7 alongside Casey Simpson, Cody Veith, Ethan Wacker, and Isaak Presley (who Campion worked with on Fuller House).

He is also a professional magician, having begun to perform magic at the age of eight.

== Filmography ==
=== Film ===
Year	Film	Role	Notes
2015	Robo-Dog	Tyler Austin	
2015	Christmas Trade	Robbie Taylor	
2017	Finding Eden	Sam	
2017	Robo-Dog 2	Tyler Austin	

=== Television ===
Year	Film	Role	Notes
2016–2020	Fuller House	Jackson Fuller	Main role
2019	Red Ruby	Theo	Main role, webseries
