= Hollywood Darlings =

American television series

- Genre: Comedy
- Created by: Jimmy Fox
- Written by: Jimmy Fox
- Directed by: Sammi Cohen
- Starring: Beverley Mitchell; Jodie Sweetin; Christine Lakin
- Country of origin: United States
- Original language: English
- No. of seasons: 2
- No. of episodes: 16

Production
- Executive producers: Beverley Mitchell; Christine Lakin; Shannon Fitzgerald
- Running time: 30 minutes
- Production companies: All3Media; Main Event Media

Original release
- Network: Pop
- Release: April 12, 2017 – June 6, 2018

Hollywood Darlings is an American comedy series starring Beverley Mitchell, Jodie Sweetin, and Christine Lakin that premiered on April 12, 2017 on Pop. On September 18, 2017, the show was renewed for a second season after it became the network’s number 1 original series debut ever among women 18–34 according to Nielsen. The second season premiered on April 18, 2018.

== Premise ==
The series is an improv comedy-series which follows three lifelong friends who grew up together in "the business," became household names, and now take on even bigger roles as moms, wives, and businesswomen. They play exaggerated versions of themselves.

== Cast ==
=== Main ===
- Beverley Mitchell as herself
- Jodie Sweetin as herself
- Christine Lakin as herself

=== Recurring ===
- Brandon Breault as himself, Christine's husband
- Soleil Moon Frye as herself
- Tony Rodriguez as Tony

=== Guest stars ===
- Andrea Barber as herself ("How Christine Got Her Groove Back")
- Andrew Keegan as himself ("How Christine Got Her Groove Back")
- Wanya Morris as himself ("Driving Miss Jodie")
- Tamera Mowry as herself ("Driving Miss Jodie")
- DeAnna Pappas as herself ("Got Milk?")
- Jaleel White as himself ("Got Milk?")
- Heather Tom as herself ("The Bev Witch Project")
- Nicholle Tom as herself ("The Bev Witch Project")
- Lance Bass as himself ("The Luke Perry Incident")
- Patrick Duffy as himself ("The Luke Perry Incident")
- Staci Keanan as herself ("The Luke Perry Incident")
- Lori Beth Denberg as herself ("She's Not All That")
- Will Friedle as himself ("Y2K")
- Marla Sokoloff as herself ("Y2K")
- Matthew Lawrence as himself ("Star Crossed Mothers")
- David Lascher as himself ("Dry Spell")
- Tatyana Ali as herself ("White Little Lies")

== Episodes ==
=== Series overview ===
Season	Episodes	Originally released	
Season	Episodes	First released	Last released
1	8	April 12, 2017	May 31, 2017
2	8	April 18, 2018	June 6, 2018

=== Season 1 (2017) ===
No. overall	No. in season	Title	Original release date	US viewers (millions)
1	1	"How Christine Got Her Groove Back"	April 12, 2017	0.118
Christine invites Beverley to Andrew Keegan’s spiritual recovery spa, whilst Jodie attempts to teach a child acting class as a favour to Andrea Barber.
2	2	"My So-Called Prom"	April 19, 2017	0.176
Beverley and Christine attempt to relive the missed experiences of their youth, Beverley by having a sleepover and Christine by trying to get invited to a real teenage prom. Jodie gives away Stephanie’s beloved Mr. Bear, claiming she has no feelings for the toy, but eventually realises this is not true.
3	3	"Driving Miss Jodie"	April 26, 2017	0.147
Beverley assists Jodie in buying her first Minivan, but Jodie is in denial that she has reached that stage of her motherhood. When the salesmen refuse to co-operate with them, the girls resort to blackmail. Christine clashes with Wanya Morris at her new yoga class.
4	4	"Got Milk?"	May 3, 2017	0.160
When Christine goes viral for lashing out at a man who took offence to her breastfeeding in public, she and Jodie attend a breastfeeding awareness group. They come to regret this when the group turn out to be more sinister than they appear. Beverley takes a job at a furniture store so she can take advantage of her employee discount to buy a new bed for her daughter.
5	5	"The Bev Witch Project"	May 10, 2017	0.191
Christine gets to choose the girl’s weekend trip, and decides to take them camping when she gets an invite from notorious pranksters Nicholle and Heather Tom. Jodie and Christine mock Beverley’s claims that the woods are dangerous, but come to regret this when she ditches them and they get lost.
6	6	"The Luke Perry Incident"	May 17, 2017	0.111
Jodie brings Beverley to an industry party so she can try and find work, but Beverley ends up embarrassing herself in her own personal way. Christine attempts to bring the cast of Step by Step back together for a reunion show, but her plan hits a snag when she discovers that two of her cast-mates no longer get on.
7	7	"She's Not All That"	May 24, 2017	0.109
Beverley hires Lori Beth Denberg as her personal assistant, only to get stabbed in the back, forcing Beverley to face her fear of confrontation and work up the courage to fire her. Jodie introduces Christine to a woman named Kat who was taking pictures of them at a cafe, the two become best friends and leave Jodie as a third wheel.
8	8	"Indecent Proposals"	May 31, 2017	0.138
Christine and Jodie attend SitCon (a convention for sitcoms), but end up getting invited to the afterparty orgy. Beverley shoots a TV pilot for a DIY show alongside Soleil Moon Frye. The two clash, then realise the producers had planned this all along.

=== Season 2 (2018) ===
No. overall	No. in season	Title	Original release date	US viewers (millions)
9	1	"Y2K"	April 18, 2018	0.141
The girls reminisce about how Marla Sokoloff ruined their Y2K party at Will Friedle’s house, and exact their payback.
10	2	"Till Death Gets Me a Part"	April 25, 2018	0.100
Christine takes Jodie’s advice and starts a rumour that she died, so that she can gain more Twitter followers and pick up better acting roles. Beverley receives an email from her doctor recommending reconstructive vaginal surgery, and completely freaks out over it.
11	3	"Star Crossed Mothers"	May 2, 2018	0.083
Fed up with her dates constantly asking her questions about Full House, Jodie wants to sign up to a celebrity dating service. Christine attempts to practice for her new role as a Russian prostitute by getting into character, and Beverley tries to get her kids enrolled at a new school by sucking up to the principal.
12	4	"The NILF"	May 9, 2018	0.120
13	5	"Ovulation Staycation"	May 16, 2018	0.117
The girls spend the weekend at a resort. Beverley annoys the other two with her meticulous schedule. Christine wants to have a baby and is in her final day of ovulation, so keeps trying to sneak away and have sex with Brandon. Jodie tries to avoid an ex-boyfriend whom she ghosted, and comes up with the excuse that she and Beverley are a lesbian couple.
14	6	"Members Only"	May 23, 2018	0.105
Beverley’s friend Kathy starts a protest calling for children to be banned from seeing nude artwork. Jodie disagrees and starts her own counter-protest, and Beverley is forced to choose sides. Christine and Brandon attempt to make friends with a new couple, but they come on too strong and end up scaring them away.
15	7	"Dry Spells"	May 30, 2018	0.119
Christine and Beverley attempt to cure a curse placed on them by some teenage girls by resorting to black magic. Jodie tracks down her first kiss for a date; Rusty from Full House.
16	8	"White Little Lies"	June 6, 2018	0.114
A parody of Big Little Lies. The girls attempt to organise a children’s birthday party as part of Tatyana Ali’s exclusive mom group.

== Ratings ==
=== Season 1 (2017) ===
Viewership and ratings per episode of Hollywood Darlings
No.	Title	Air date	Rating (18–49)	Viewers (millions)
1	"How Christine Got Her Groove Back"	April 12, 2017	0.03	0.118
2	"My So-Called Prom"	April 19, 2017	0.03	0.176
3	"Driving Miss Jodie"	April 26, 2017	0.04	0.147
4	"Got Milk?"	May 3, 2017	0.04	0.160
5	"The Bev Witch Project"	May 10, 2017	0.04	0.191
6	"The Luke Perry Incident"	May 17, 2017	0.02	0.111
7	"She's Not All That"	May 24, 2017	0.03	0.109
8	"Indecent Proposals"	May 31, 2017	0.05	0.138

=== Season 2 (2018) ===
Viewership and ratings per episode of Hollywood Darlings
No.	Title	Air date	Rating (18–49)	Viewers (millions)
1	"Y2K"	April 18, 2018	0.03	0.141
2	"Till Death Gets Me a Part"	April 25, 2018	0.03	0.100
3	"Star Crossed Mothers"	May 2, 2018	0.01	0.083
4	"The NILF"	May 9, 2018	0.04	0.120
5	"Ovulation Staycation"	May 16, 2018	0.03	0.117
6	"Members Only"	May 23, 2018	0.03	0.105
7	"Dry Spells"	May 30, 2018	0.04	0.119
8	"White Little Lies"	June 6, 2018	0.03	0.114

== Trivia ==
- The show started in season 1 out as a mockumentary style comedy, with the characters giving commentary during the scenes. Season 2 is a bit more stylized.
