= Full House season 8 =

Full House
- Season 8
- DVD cover
- Starring: John Stamos; Bob Saget; Dave Coulier; Candace Cameron; Jodie Sweetin; Lori Loughlin; Andrea Barber; Blake & Dylan Tuomy-Wilhoit; Mary-Kate and Ashley Olsen
- No. of episodes: 24

Release
- Original network: ABC
- Original release: September 27, 1994 – May 23, 1995

Season chronology
- ← Previous; Season 7

The eighth and final season of the ABC sitcom Full House originally aired between September 27, 1994 and May 23, 1995.

Though he is featured on the DVD cover and credited as a cast member, Scott Weinger does not appear in this season nor is there any mention of Steve Hale until the series finale in which he makes a brief guest appearance.

This was the show's final season, as ABC decided to cancel it in 1995 due to rising production costs. The series would continue in the Netflix spin-off Fuller House, released in 2016.

== Plot ==
In the final season, Danny begins to date Gia's mother, Claire. Rebecca is promoted to producer of Wake Up San Francisco. The Rippers fire Jesse, which prompts him to start another band called Hot Daddy and The Monkey Puppets. Joey becomes a substitute teacher at Michelle’s school. D.J. is in her final year of high school and aspires to enroll at Stanford. After her break-up with Steve, she briefly dates rich boy, Nelson and a guitarist named Viper, neither of which are as successful. Stephanie is in the seventh grade. Michelle begins third grade along with her friends Teddy, Aaron, Derek, and Lisa. Nicky and Alex start preschool.

== Main cast ==
- John Stamos as Jesse Katsopolis
- Bob Saget as Danny Tanner
- Dave Coulier as Joey Gladstone
- Candace Cameron as D.J. Tanner
- Jodie Sweetin as Stephanie Tanner
- Mary-Kate & Ashley Olsen as Michelle Tanner
- Lori Loughlin as Rebecca Donaldson-Katsopolis
- Andrea Barber as Kimmy Gibbler
- Blake & Dylan Tuomy-Wilhoit as Nicky & Alex Katsopolis

== Episodes ==
No. overall	No. in season	Title	Directed by	Written by	Original release date	U.S. viewers (millions)
169	1	"Comet's Excellent Adventure"	Joel Zwick	Marc Warren & Dennis Rinsler	September 27, 1994	20.4
Michelle takes Comet for a walk by herself, but he gets loose and spends the day roaming around the city of San Francisco with a Rough Collie. Upon learning of Comet's disappearance, the family frantically searches for him. Meanwhile, Jesse is fired from his band, Jesse and the Rippers, due to increasing responsibilities in his life. The stress was what started the chain of events leading up to Comet's disappearance. Note: This is the only episode that was actually taped on location in San Francisco.
170	2	"Breaking Away"	Joel Zwick	Tom Amundsen	October 4, 1994	19.4
Remember how Danny felt when Michelle started pre-school? Now it's Jesse and Becky's turn to fret when Nicky and Alex start pre-school. Meanwhile, Gia (Marla Sokoloff) is beginning to really influence Stephanie, and Stephanie turns into a slob. Michelle is angry and tries to move out of her and Stephanie's bedroom. Note: This episode is the last with production credit and distributor voice-overs by Dave Coulier for syndicated reruns.
171	3	"Making Out Is Hard to Do"	Joel Zwick	Carolyn Omine	October 11, 1994	18.6
Stephanie goes to a party at Gia's apartment, but it turns out to be an unsupervised make-out party. Meanwhile, Barry Williams replaces Jesse as the lead singer of the Rippers, leading them to great success, and Jesse imagines his future without music when he decides to give up music altogether.
172	4	"I've Got a Secret"	Joel Zwick	Ellen Guylas	October 18, 1994	18.8
Michelle joins a secret club and they all take an oath to not tell anyone about it, and anyone who tells gets kicked out of the club. When they decide how to become leader of the club they have to get a special toy. When Michelle asks Danny for some money she won't get any until she tells him the reason why she wants some. She then tells him about the secret club. When they have a club meeting, Danny accidentally reveals that he knows about the club and Michelle gets kicked out. Danny, Jesse, and Joey set out to find the toy that would get her back in the club. When the store opens, they're unable to get the toy due to how popular it is. But they find a street merchant and buy one from him. When Michelle gets back in the club, it turns out that the toy that they bought from the street merchant is a knock-off and not the real thing. In the subplot, after D.J. and Nelson's break-up, Kimmy takes a crack at Nelson, leaving D.J. jealous. Meanwhile, Becky and Jesse make lists about their ex-lovers.
173	5	"To Joey, With Love"	Joel Zwick	Jamie Tatham & Chuck Tatham	October 25, 1994	19.3
Joey is the substitute teacher for Michelle's class. Of course, Michelle thinks he will be the best teacher, but when she pushes him to be fun it gets her sent to the principal's office. Meanwhile, Jesse auditions guitarists, including Danny, for a spot in his new band. Danny turns out to be excellent, and Jesse fears that he will have to put Danny in the band until he is blown away via an audition by Viper, a young rebel who is smitten with D.J.
174	6	"You Pet It, You Bought It"	Joel Zwick	Greg Fields	November 1, 1994	21.3
Michelle makes $221 selling lemonade to construction workers on an unseasonably hot day, and when Kimmy goes with her to the candy store to spend her money, she gets sidetracked and ends up buying a donkey (whom she names Shorty) at a petting zoo instead, causing much trouble amongst the family, such as D.J.'s allergic reaction to Shorty, with her senior pictures the next day, its constant braying during the night, destroying a valuable photo of one of Danny's ancestors and wrecking Stephanie's homework. Everyone likes Becky's idea of donating Shorty to the children's zoo. Meanwhile, Jesse tries to sing the Three's Company theme song, but keeps getting some of the lyrics wrong until the family helps him out in the end.
175	7	"On the Road Again"	Tom Rickard	Ellen Guylas	November 8, 1994	14.4
Jesse hits the road with his new band, only to find out that it isn't as glamorous as he once thought it was. D.J. gets intimate with Jesse's band's guitarist, Viper, which infuriates Danny and Jesse, and Jesse throws Viper out of the band ("You know the rule, no dating my family!"), but eventually lets him in again after he helps him out in a tight situation involving his past and polka. He also lets D.J. date him again after Becky explained to him about how she got her mother's approval of him.
176	8	"Claire and Present Danger"	Joel Zwick	Tom Amundsen	November 22, 1994	20.4
Danny and Gia's mother begin dating, which Stephanie and Gia find great but Michelle finds not so great. On Danny and Claire's date at the Smash Club, Michelle has a drastic change in style. This causes Danny to lay down the law. D.J. discovers Viper is illiterate, leading to tension between them; Jesse then helps them smooth things over. Meanwhile, Joey has a date with two French women named Yvette and Marie, only to discover that it's not what it seems.
177	9	"Stephanie's Wild Ride"	John Tracy	Adam I. Lapidus	November 29, 1994	19.1
Stephanie and Gia go for a joy-ride with a pair of high school boys that they met at the mall, who drive very recklessly. Meanwhile, when Michelle asks for help on a video game, Jesse, Joey, Danny and Becky become obsessed with beating the game. Later, Gia invites Stephanie to go for another joy-ride, but D.J. stops Stephanie from going by warning her and threatening to tell Danny if she goes. Stephanie gets mad at her, but later realizes that D.J. saved her life after learning Gia and the boys were in a bad car accident. Scott Whyte appears as Jason, one of the boys Stephanie and Gia meet.
178	10	"Under the Influence"	John Tracy	Adam I. Lapidus	December 6, 1994	21.8
D.J. and Kimmy go to a college fraternity party, where Kimmy gets drunk. Upon leaving the party, they argue over what really happened and Kimmy gets mad at D.J. for "ruining" her night, but realizes that D.J. only cared so much because Pam was killed by a drunk driver. In the subplot, the twins begin to hate Michelle after she snaps at them. This leads to Jesse trying to teach the twins about forgiveness. Meanwhile, Joey tries to get better at cooking, only to make it worse that the family must go to Denny's.
179	11	"Arrest Ye Merry Gentlemen"	John Tracy	Carolyn Omine	December 13, 1994	20.6
Jesse and Michelle get locked in a toy store on Christmas Eve when they attempt to return a gift to the grumpy owner (Mickey Rooney). The twins begin to fear Santa Claus after seeing D.J. and Stephanie trying to help Joey fit in his Santa suit, believing him to be hurting them. The owner then dresses as Santa Claus and comes to the Tanners' home, after they realize what a nice man he is.
180	12	"D.J.'s Choice"	John Tracy	Mark Fink	January 3, 1995	21.6
Nelson and Viper fight over who deserves to be D.J.'s boyfriend after Viper breaks up with her. The family along with the rest of the neighborhood work together to help rebuild their vandalized local park. Special guest Frankie Valli.
181	13	"The Producer"	James O'Keefe	Diana Darby	January 10, 1995	20.8
Becky is promoted to producer of "Wake Up, San Francisco", making Danny feel jealous. D.J. and Stephanie make a bet on how long they can go without junk food, and Jesse tries to control the twins, who act up at a restaurant. Joey finds out that his favorite cookies, Vanilla Weasels, are no longer being made, making him very disappointed. The twins apologize for their behavior, while Danny apologizes to Becky for being jealous of her, saying that he wanted Michelle to be proud of him.
182	14	"Super Bowl Fun Day"	Joel Zwick	Jamie Tatham & Chuck Tatham	January 25, 1995	18.7
Joey and Jesse had previously agreed to take Michelle and her friends to the science museum on the same day as Super Bowl XXIX, but Joey doesn't want to miss the game, so they, along with the children, go to a sports bar, instead. Jesse and Joey get in trouble in the bar after accidentally breaking the television. In order to appease the angry sports fans, they bring them over to their house to watch the game. Danny and Becky are on special assignment at the big game in Miami. Meanwhile, D.J. has a scholarship interview.
183	15	"My Left and Right Foot"	Tom Rickard	Ellen Guylas	January 31, 1995	18.2
After being teased by her sisters and Kimmy while shopping for shoes, Michelle believes that her feet are too big. With her friend Lisa's help, Michelle attempts to make them smaller by wrapping them in Shrink wrap and soaking them in water filled with ice cubes. When Danny finds out, along with D.J., Stephanie and Joey, he tells D.J. and Stephanie that teasing is not only harmful, it also can really blow things out of proportion for a little kid. D.J. and Stephanie apologize to Michelle. Jesse discovers Becky's bad singing when she joins him, Joey and Danny in singing the boys a bedtime song, (House at Pooh Corner by Kenny Loggins).
184	16	"Air Jesse"	Joel Zwick	Laurie Parres	February 7, 1995	20.9
Jesse agrees to take part in a charity basketball game, but he clearly does not have any skills or knowledge of basketball. Kareem Abdul-Jabbar is the celebrity referee for the game. Jesse, unknowingly, gets lessons in basketball from him. Becky deals with a bad sweater that Stephanie made.
185	17	"Dateless in San Francisco"	Joel Zwick	Greg Fields	February 14, 1995	17.3
In preparation for a Valentine's Day party at school, Michelle and Teddy attempt to be boyfriend and girlfriend. Joey also gets sent candy and flowers from a secret admirer. Jesse and Becky try to have a romantic Valentine's Day, and Danny tries to have a good date with Claire as well.
186	18	"We Got the Beat"	John Tracy	Marc Warren & Dennis Rinsler	February 21, 1995	18.2
Stephanie, Gia, their friend Melissa from school, and Kimmy start a band, with Jesse as their manager. But they are more concerned with their looks and attitude than actually playing music. Jesse is tired of their lackadaisical disposition and when he points this out he is fired as manager. As a result, their performance goes bad. Meanwhile, Danny and Joey try to use D.J.'s homework to get rich quick.
187	19	"Taking the Plunge"	John Tracy	Tom Amundsen	February 28, 1995	20.5
Kimmy goes off to Reno, Nevada to marry her boyfriend, Duane, after being rejected by every single college in California. The Tanners originally think it is D.J. marrying Nelson because she didn't get into Stanford, where she had always wanted to go to. Although she left a note telling them where she went, a hungry Comet chewed it up and what's left is what seems like D.J. saying she and Nelson will marry in Reno, but what she actually wrote was that Kimmy was getting married and that she was with Nelson on her way to Reno. The Tanners also find an empty jewelry case, which they thought was for a ring, but was really just rented earrings that Nelson had gotten for D.J. to wear. Danny and Jesse hurry to Reno to stop the supposed wedding, only to find out the truth. Jesse and Danny decided talk to Kimmy and talk her out of marriage. Kimmy decides not to get married. Meanwhile, Joey meets the Queen of the United Kingdom, but while trying to get a picture for Michelle, is mistaken as an assassin and tackled by security guards.
188	20	"Up on the Roof"	John Tracy	Story by : David Valliere; Teleplay by : Matt Miller & Barrie Nedler	March 14, 1995	19.6
Jesse and Kimmy talk D.J. into pulling a "classic" senior prank: lifting the principal's car up onto the roof of the school. Jesse, however, decides to take the blame when he is caught in the car after trying to put the hood up because it was raining, but D.J. decides to fess up. The principal, however, seems angry at first, but then confesses a secret of his to a surprised D.J.: he actually likes seeing who can pull the best prank on him. Michelle and Becky's cooking causes some bad digestion for the Tanners.
189	21	"Leap of Faith"	Joel Zwick	Chuck Tatham & Jamie Tatham	March 21, 1995	18.9
A guest on Wake Up, San Francisco convinces Becky to go bungee jumping, much to Jesse's disapproval, despite his rebellious nature. When he realizes his disapproval stems from his love for her, he changes his tune, and they take the jump together. Meanwhile, Michelle wants to be more like D.J. and Stephanie, and attend a Counting Crows concert, so D.J. and Stephanie tease her by making up a story that she has "Smedrick's Disease". However, they soon feel their guilty consciences kicking in when they realize why Michelle wanted to attend the concert, and apologize to her for what they did.
190	22	"All Stood Up"	Joel Zwick	Story by : Marc Warren & Dennis Rinsler; Teleplay by : Carolyn Omine & Adam I. Lapidus	April 4, 1995	18.2
Stephanie asks a boy at school that she has a crush on, Ryan (Andrew Keegan), to go to the dance with her, and he agrees. But on the night of the dance, Ryan doesn't show up, and Danny tries to take charge of the situation, only to make it worse. Michelle tries to beat D.J. at something, eventually winning at limbo. Kimmy interferes with Jesse's attempts to lower his blood pressure, and Jesse tries to stop her attempts, as well as Joey's convincing him to have a Ho-ho. Note: Although it was not the last episode to air, this episode was the last of the show to be taped.
191	23	"Michelle Rides Again (Parts 1 and 2)"	Joel Zwick	Story by : Marc Warren & Dennis Rinsler; Teleplay by : Adam I. Lapidus	May 23, 1995	24.3
192	24	"Michelle Rides Again (Parts 1 and 2)"	Joel Zwick	Story by : Marc Warren & Dennis Rinsler; Teleplay by : Carolyn Omine	May 23, 1995	24.3
Michelle enters a horse riding competition and becomes friends with another contestant, Elizabeth. But when Danny and Elizabeth's mother put too much pressure on each of their children to win, Michelle and Elizabeth go off riding for fun instead of going through with the competition. When Michelle attempts to get her horse to jump over a log, the horse panics and Michelle is thrown off, hitting her head and being knocked unconscious. Meanwhile, Kimmy tries to find D.J. a date to the senior prom, Stephanie tries to rehearse for a play, and Jesse and Joey consider adding to their already busy agenda. Michelle gets amnesia after suffering a concussion from a fall and cannot remember who she is or who her family is. Everyone tries different things to get Michelle to remember who she is, but nothing works. Stephanie's play partner, Andrew (Will Estes), kisses her after finding out that she has a crush on him and Kimmy has arranged for her boyfriend's cousin to be D.J.'s prom date. Towards the end, Michelle gets her memory back and everyone is overjoyed to find this out. Michelle has no memory of the accident and asks why everyone is so happy. D.J. explains that she hit her head after falling off her horse and Becky says that Michelle could not remember anything about who she was or anyone else. Michelle tells everyone that she could never forget them because they are her family, which Danny is happy to hear. Kimmy arrives and tells D.J. that her date could not make it. D.J. is disappointed that she will miss the prom, but Kimmy tells her that she found another date for her and Steve (Scott Weinger) walks in the door. D.J. is happy to see him and they hug and tell each other they have been missed and share a kiss. The family greets Steve and Michelle asks Jesse how out of it she was. Jesse tells her that she was pretty out of it and that it was like a part of her was missing so then a part of all of them was, but that they got through it. Danny picks up Michelle and says "Just like we always will" as the episode ends. Note: In the original ABC airing, during the ending credits, the main cast members gave their final curtain call. Then, the words "Our Thanks, Our Love" appeared on the screen.

== See also ==
- List of Full House episodes
