= Andrea Barber =

American actress and comedian (born 1976)

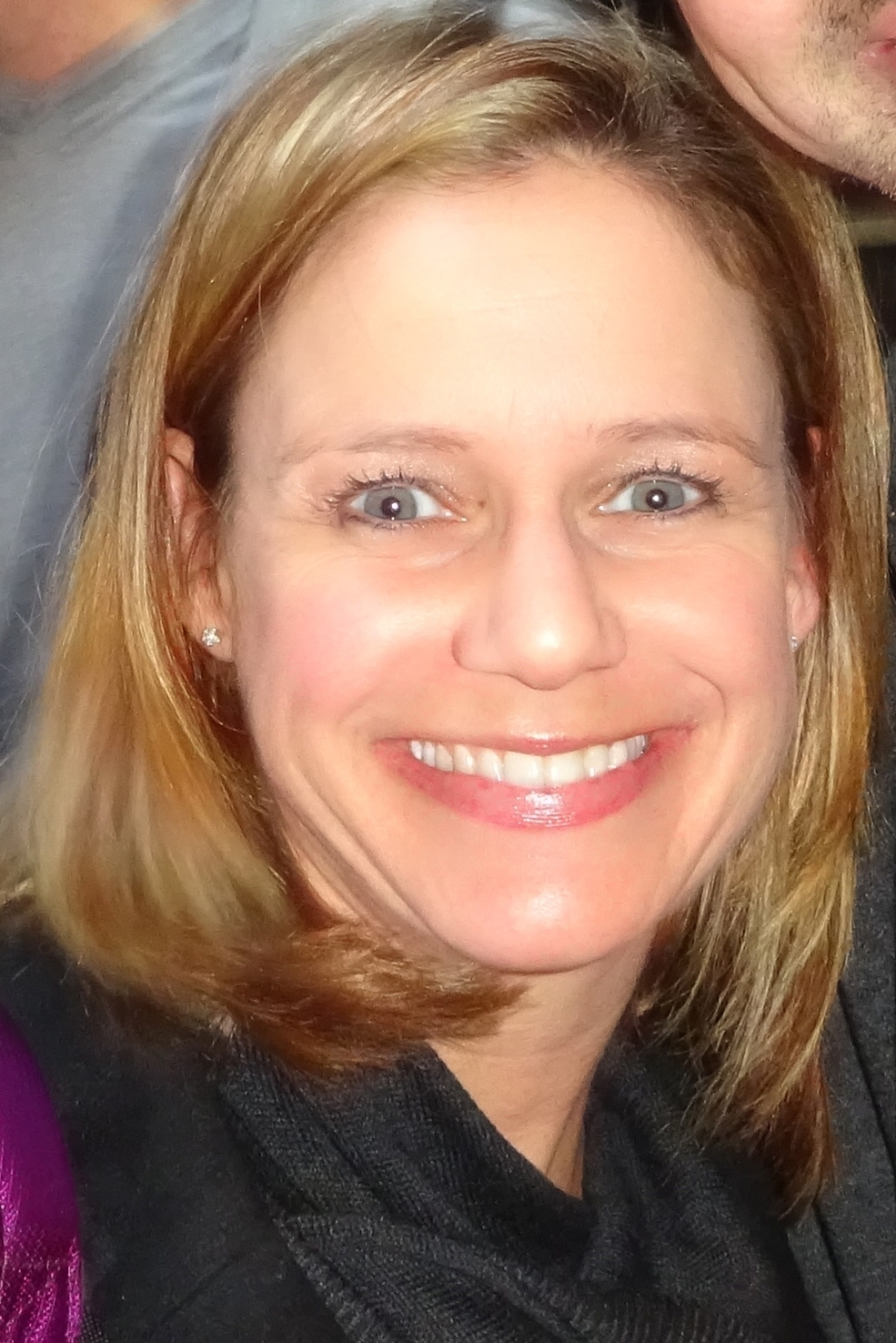
- Barber in 2016
- Born: Andrea Laura Barber; July 3, 1976 (age 50); Los Angeles, California, U.S.
- Education: Whittier College; University of York
- Occupations: Actress; comedian
- Years active: 1982–1995; 2012; 2015–present
- Spouse: Jeremy Rytky (m. 2002; div. 2014)
- Children: 2

Andrea Laura Barber (born July 3, 1976) is an American actress and comedian. She is best known for playing Kimmy Gibbler in the ABC sitcom Full House and the Netflix sequel series Fuller House.

== Early life ==
Barber is the youngest of three children born to Sherry Barber. She graduated from La Serna High School in Whittier, California. She earned a degree in English from Whittier College in 1999. Barber also has an MA in Women's Studies from the University of York, England. She returned to Whittier as assistant to the director of Whittier College's Office of International Programs.

== Career ==
Barber's first major role was as the original Carrie Brady on the American soap opera Days of Our Lives, from 1982 to 1986. She also guest-starred and starred in many movies and television series. Barber is known for her role on the sitcom Full House as Kimmy Gibbler, the best friend of D.J. Tanner, which she played from 1987 to 1995. She was at first a recurring role, but shortly after that became a regular. After Full House ended, Barber retired from acting and focused on her personal life. In 2012, Barber reprised the role for a Funny or Die sketch called It's F*ckin Late alongside Dave Coulier, her former Full House co-star.

Barber reprised her role as Kimmy Gibbler in the Full House spin-off series Fuller House, along with Candace Cameron Bure and Jodie Sweetin. The series premiered on Netflix on February 26, 2016, and concluded on June 2, 2020, after five seasons. She plays Principal Willingham on the Nickelodeon series That Girl Lay Lay, which premiered on September 23, 2021.

== Personal life ==
In 2002, Barber married Jeremy Rytky. They have two children together. The couple divorced in 2014.

Barber enjoys running. She has completed twenty-six half-marathons and three full marathons, as of 2016.

== Filmography ==
=== Film ===
Year	Title	Role	Notes
1995	The Skateboard Kid II	Tilly Curtis	

=== Television ===
Year	Title	Role	Notes
1982–1986	Days of Our Lives	Carrie Brady	Recurring role
1983	Fantasy Island	Amanda Gorman	Episode: "The Wedding Picture/Castaways"
1985	Do You Remember Love	Jennifer	Television film
1985	St. Elsewhere	Carrie Garman	Episode: "Remembrance of Things Past"
1985	The Twilight Zone	Cathy Marano	Episode: "If She Dies"
1986	Wonderful World of Color	Zoey	Episode: "The Leftovers"
1986	Our House	Naomi	Episode: "The Third Question"
1987–1995	Full House	Kimberly "Kimmy" Gibbler	Main role (season 5–8); recurring (season 1–4)
1990	Growing Pains	Rhonda Green	Episode: "Ben's Sure Thing"
1992	To Grandmother's House We Go	2nd Viewer	Television film
2012	Funny or Die	Kimberly "Kimmy" Gibbler	Episode: "It's F*Ckin' Late with Dave Coulier"
2016–2020	Fuller House	Kimberly "Kimmy" Gibbler	Main role; Writer: "College Tours"
2017	Hollywood Darlings	Andrea	Episode: "How Christine Got Her Groove Back"
2017	The Talk	Herself	Guest panelist
2021–2024	That Girl Lay Lay	Principal Zelda Willingham	Recurring role
2022	Christmas on Candy Cane Lane	Ivy Donaldson	Television film

== Awards and nominations ==
Year	Award	Category	Work	Result
1984	Soap Opera Digest Awards	Outstanding Youth Actress in a Daytime Soap Opera	Days of Our Lives	Won
1985	Soap Opera Digest Awards	Outstanding Youth Actress in a Daytime Series	Days of Our Lives	Won
1985	Young Artist Awards	Best Young Supporting Actress in a Daytime or Nighttime Drama	Days of Our Lives	Nominated
1986	Young Artist Awards	Outstanding Young Actress - Regular Daytime Series	Days of Our Lives	Nominated
1990	Young Artist Awards	Best Young Actress Supporting Role in a Television Series	Full House	Won
1991	Young Artist Awards	Best Young Actress Supporting or Re-Occurring Role for a TV Series	Full House	Won
1992	Young Artist Awards	Best Young Actress Co-starring in a Television Series	Full House	Nominated
1993	Young Artist Awards	Best Young Actress Co-starring in a Television Series	Full House	Nominated
1995	Young Artist Awards	Best Youth Comedienne in a TV Show	Full House	Nominated
2016	Teen Choice Awards	Choice TV: Chemistry (shared with: Candace Cameron Bure and Jodie Sweetin)	Fuller House	Nominated
