= Blake McIver Ewing =

American actor

- Born: Los Angeles, California, U.S.
- Other names: Blake McIver, Blake Ewing
- Occupations: Actor; musician
- Years active: 1992–present
- Parents: Bill Ewing (father); Susan McIver (mother)

Blake McIver Ewing, also known as Blake McIver and Blake Ewing, is an American actor and singer. He was known for playing Michelle's friend, Derek, on the sitcom Full House, a role he reprised in Fuller House. He played the role of Waldo in the 1994 feature film version of The Little Rascals and voiced Eugene on Hey Arnold! during its 5th season (replacing Benjamin Diskin, Jarrett Lennon and Christopher Castile). He was also one of the hosts of the Bravo series The People's Couch.

Ewing co-wrote and performed the song "Along the River," the end credit song for the film, End of the Spear. He has contributed his work to the It Gets Better Project, citing his own experiences as a gay teenager as his motivation. His debut album, The Time Manipulator, was released in May 2014. Throughout 2013 Ewing worked as a go-go dancer in Los Angeles. "The tips were good. In fact, I raised so much money, I was able to finish my record — mission accomplished."

Ewing was nominated for an Ovation Award for his role as "The Little Boy" in the Los Angeles production of Ragtime. He is a graduate of UCLA.

Blake released his equality anthem, "This Is Who We Are" on July 14, 2015, and works as a host for AfterBuzz TV.

== Filmography ==
=== Films ===
Year	Film	Role	Other notes
1993	Calendar Girl	Six-year-old Ned	
1994	The Little Rascals	Waldo Aloysius Johnston III	
1995	Gordy	Piglet	Voice
1995	Tom and Huck	Taverner	
1995	Problem Child 3: Junior in Love	Corky McCallum	
1997	Anastasia	Additional voices	
2000	The Little Mermaid II: Return to the Sea	Boy #1	Voice
2002	Hey Arnold!: The Movie	Eugene Horowitz	Voice
2003	Recess: Taking the Fifth Grade	Menlo	Voice
2004	Raising Helen	Church Choir	
2017	A Very Sordid Wedding	Peter	Cameo

=== Television ===
Year	Title	Role	Other notes
1992	Star Search	Himself	1 episode
1992–1995	Full House	Derek S. Boyd	9 episodes
1993	The Nanny	Robbie	Episode: "Here Comes the Brood"
1993	Home Improvement	Choir Boy	Episode: "'Twas the Blight Before Christmas"; uncredited
1995–1996	Minor Adjustments	Duncan	4 episodes
1997	Clueless	Cody	Episode: "Intruder Spawn"
1997–2000	Recess	Menlo	Voice, 5 episodes
2000	The Drew Carey Show	Wolfgang	Episode: "The Pregnancy Scare"
2001–2003	Hey Arnold!	Eugene Horowitz	Voice, season 5
2014	The People's Couch	Himself	8 episodes
2020	Fuller House	Derek S. Boyd	Episode: "Our Very Last Show, Again"

=== Radio ===
Year	Title	Role	Other notes
1998–2001	Adventures in Odyssey	Nathaniel Graham	14 episodes
1998–2001	Adventures in Odyssey	Timothy "Timmy" Riley	2 episodes

== Discography ==
=== Albums ===
- 2014 The Time Manipulator
