= Jodie Sweetin =

American actress and television personality (born 1982)

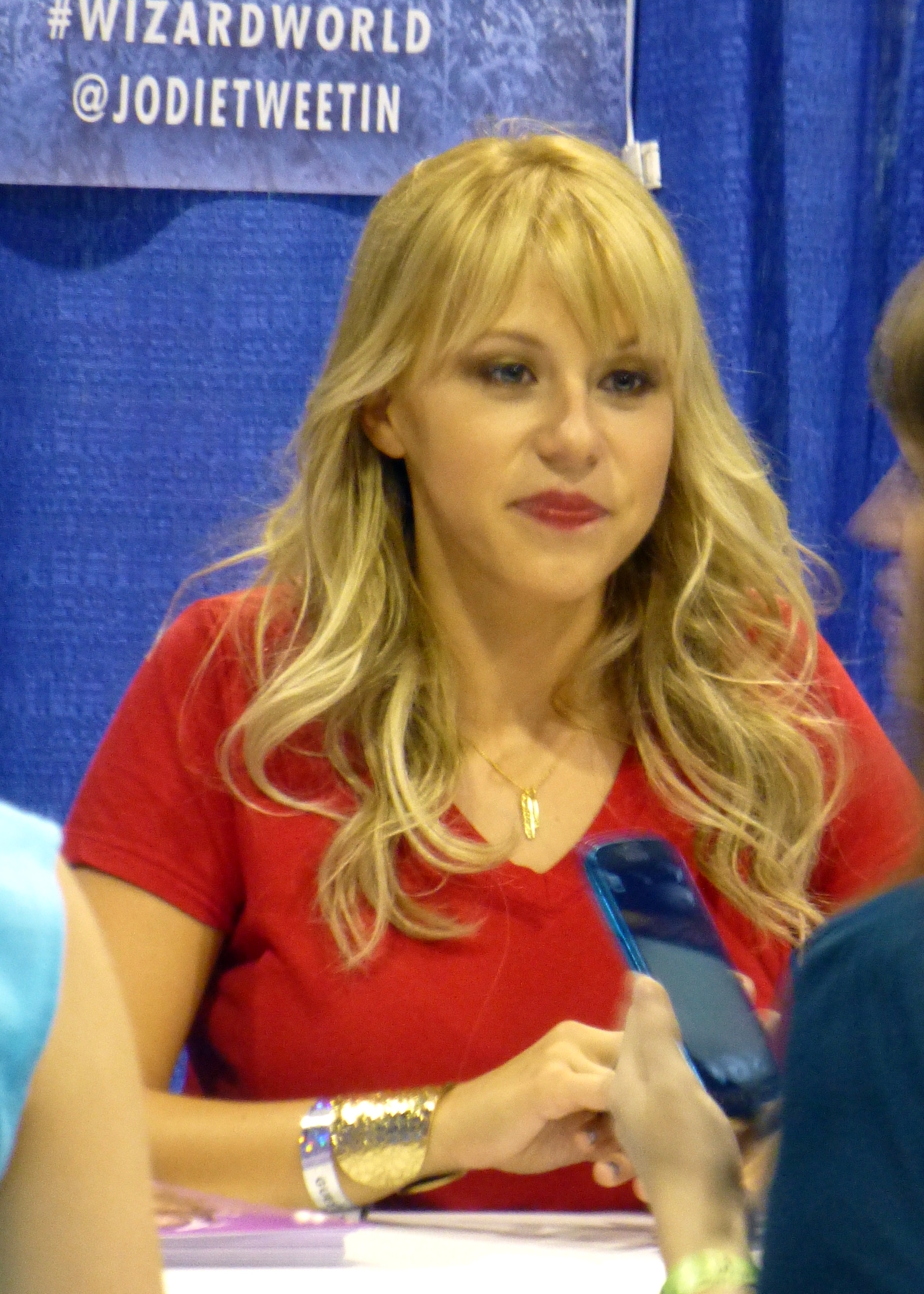
- Sweetin at Wizard World Chicago in 2015
- Born: Jodie Lee Ann Sweetin; January 19, 1982 (age 44); Los Angeles, California, U.S.
- Education: Chapman University
- Occupations: Actress; television personality; comedian
- Years active: 1987–present
- Spouses: Shaun Holguin (m. 2002; div. 2006); Cody Herpin (m. 2007; div. 2010); Morty Coyle (m. 2012; div. 2016); Mescal Wasilewski (m. 2022)
- Partner: Justin Hodak (2015–2017, engaged 2016–2017)
- Children: 2

Jodie Lee Ann Sweetin (born January 19, 1982) is an American actress, television personality, and stand-up comedian. She is best known for her role as Stephanie Tanner in the ABC comedy series Full House and its Netflix sequel series Fuller House.

== Early life and education ==
Sweetin was born in Los Angeles, California. While an infant, her parents were sent to prison and she was adopted and raised as an only child by her uncle Sam Sweetin and his second wife Janice when she was nine months old. Her father died in a prison riot. Years later, she said she was told not to talk about her adoption publicly out of fear that people would think she was forced into acting.

As a child, Sweetin took dance lessons, including ballet and tap when she was three years old.

In 1999, four years after Full House ended, Sweetin graduated from Los Alamitos High School in Los Alamitos, California, and attended Chapman University in Orange, California. While in high school, Sweetin and fellow actor Matthew Morrison performed in musical theater together.

== Career ==
She began her career by appearing in several national commercials for companies such as restaurant chain Sizzler in 1987. Sweetin was cast in a guest role in the sitcom Valerie as Pamela, the niece of Edie McClurg's character Mrs. Poole. Jeff Franklin cast her as Stephanie Tanner in the ABC comedy series Full House, and she played that role until the show ended in 1995. Sweetin played the role of Stephanie Tanner from age five until she was 13 years old.

Sweetin returned to television by hosting the second season of the Fuse dance competition show Pants-Off Dance-Off. She starred in the television pilot Small Bits of Happiness, a dark comedy centered around a suicide prevention specialist; it won Best Comedy at the 3rd Annual Independent Television Festival in Los Angeles. In 2009, Sweetin focused on independent films and appeared in two films: Port City and Redefining Love. In 2011, she appeared in five web episodes in the Internet show Can't Get Arrested. In 2012, she appeared as Leia in the television film Singled Out.

In 2015, it was announced Sweetin would reprise her role as Stephanie Tanner on the Netflix spin-off series Fuller House, which ended after five seasons in 2020. On March 2, 2016, Sweetin was announced as one of the celebrities to compete on Dancing with the Stars for season 22. Her professional dance partner was Keo Motsepe. Sweetin and Motsepe were eliminated in week eight of the competition and finished in sixth place. On April 12, 2017, she starred in Hollywood Darlings, an unscripted docu-comedy series for Pop, where she plays an exaggerated version of herself. The series ran for two seasons and concluded on June 6, 2018.

In 2019, Sweetin started a podcast called Never Thought I'd Say This on parenting alongside Celia Behar, a licensed mental health counselor and Sweetin's best friend. In 2022, Sweetin competed on CBS's Beyond the Edge, the seventh celebrity edition of Food Network's Worst Cooks in America: That's So '90s, and the second season of FOX's Name That Tune.

In 2023, Sweetin appeared in a television commercial for Sizzler, 36 years after her first commercial for the restaurant chain.

In 2026, Sweetin competed in the HGTV series Totally 90s House while being partnered with fellow actors, Brian Austin Green and Beverley Mitchell.

=== Stand-up comedy career ===
In the 2020s, Sweetin began to gravitate towards performing and hosting stand-up comedy shows across California, mainly in Los Angeles but occasionally in other cities. She credits Bob Saget as a major influence on her stand-up style, saying in a January 2026 interview with the San Francisco Chronicle that "I was just a sponge, soaking up blue comedy from Bob my entire life. He was always looking for a joke in any possible situation, no matter how dark[. ...A]nd once I left the Full House kids table, Bob and I would just toss it back and forth. We were the ones who always derailed the cast's text group chats."

== Personal life ==
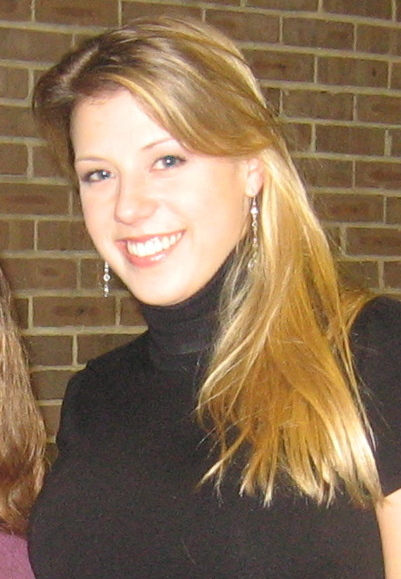
Sweetin at Rutgers University in 2007

In 2002, at age 20, Sweetin married her first husband, Los Angeles Police officer Shaun Holguin. Fellow Full House castmate Candace Cameron served as her matron of honor; Cameron's daughter, Natasha, served as a flower girl. Sweetin and Holguin divorced in 2006.

Sweetin met Cody Herpin, a film transportation coordinator, through friends, and they started dating in May 2007. They were married in Las Vegas, Nevada, on July 14, 2007. Together they have one daughter. On November 19, 2008, Sweetin filed for legal separation from Herpin. Their divorce was finalized on April 20, 2010.

In 2010, Sweetin and her boyfriend of one year, Morty Coyle, had a daughter. Sweetin and Coyle became engaged in January 2011, and married on March 15, 2012, in Beverly Hills. Sweetin filed for legal separation from Coyle in June 2013. The divorce was finalized in September 2016.

On January 22, 2016, she announced her engagement to Justin Hodak, who, like Sweetin, is a recovering drug addict. By March 2017, Sweetin was granted an emergency restraining order against him, and on March 24, Sweetin announced the couple's separation after Hodak violated the restraining order. Hodak was sentenced on related charges a few weeks later.

On January 17, 2022, she announced her engagement to Mescal Wasilewski. They were married on July 30, 2022.

In 2018, during Brett Kavanaugh's nomination hearings, Sweetin revealed on her Instagram account that she had been sexually abused in the past.

=== Substance abuse ===
Sweetin started drinking alcohol when she was 14 years old, one year after Full House ended. Over parts of the next 13 years, she abused ecstasy, methamphetamine, and crack cocaine, among others, stating that she turned to drugs because she was "bored". In 2009, Sweetin wrote the memoir unSweetined, which chronicles her progressive reliance on alcohol and drugs that began with the ending of Full House. In one passage of the book, Sweetin discusses breaking into tears while addressing a crowd at Wisconsin's Marquette University while coming down from a two-day methamphetamine, cocaine, and ecstasy binge. She spoke about growing up on television and about how much her life had improved since getting sober. She said she went sober for good in December 2008, but briefly relapsed after separating from Coyle in 2013. She later began working as a clinical logistics coordinator at a Los Angeles drug rehab center and completed her degree as a drug and alcohol counselor.

Sweetin became a public advocate for recovery from addiction.

=== Political views ===
Sweetin has expressed support for the Black Lives Matter movement, and she was also active with Refuse Fascism, to demand the removal of the Trump administration through nonviolent street protests.

On June 25, 2022, Sweetin was shoved by members of the Los Angeles Police Department and fell to the ground while she was protesting for abortion rights in the wake of Dobbs v. Jackson Women's Health Organization, a U.S. Supreme Court decision that overruled Roe v. Wade and Planned Parenthood v. Casey leading to abortion bans in multiple states. A representative for Sweetin reported that she is "OK" and the LAPD released a statement saying that the use of force would be evaluated to see whether it followed their policy and procedure.

== Filmography ==
=== Film ===
Year	Title	Role	Notes
2006	Farce of the Penguins	"He's so gross" penguin	Voice role; direct to video
2009	Redefining Love	Ally	
2009	Port City	Nancy	
2012	Singled Out	Leia	Television film
2013	Defending Santa	Beth	Television film
2015	Walt Before Mickey	Charlotte Disney	
2018	My Perfect Romance	Michelle Blair	Television film
2022	Merry Swissmas	Alex	Television film
2023	Craft Me a Romance	Nicole Broden	Television film
2024	Love's Second Act	Jamie Leoni	Television film
2025	Dateless to Dangerous: My Son's Secret Life	Noelle Miller	Television film

==== Hallmark Channel films ====
Year	Title	Role	Notes
2017	Finding Santa	Grace Long	
2018	Entertaining Christmas	Candace	
2019	Love Under the Rainbow	Lucy Taylor	
2019	Merry & Bright	Cate	
2022	A Cozy Christmas Inn	Erika	
2023	The Jane Mysteries: Inheritance Lost	Jane Da Silva	Hallmark Movies & Mysteries
2024	The Jane Mysteries: A Deadly Prescription	Jane Da Silva	Hallmark Movies & Mysteries
2024	The Jane Mysteries: Death at Moseby	Jane Da Silva	Hallmark Movies & Mysteries
2024	The Jane mysteries: Too much to lose	Jane Da Silva	Hallmark Movies & Mysteries
2024	The Heiress and the Handyman	Ione	Hallmark Channel

=== Television ===
Year	Title	Role	Notes
1987	The Hogan Family	Pamela Poole	Episode: "Boston Tea Party"
1987–1995	Full House	Stephanie Tanner	Main role
1989	The All-New Mickey Mouse Club	Stephanie Tanner	Episode: "Guest Day"
1996	Brotherly Love	Lydia Lump	Episode: "Downtown Girl"
1999	Party of Five	Rhiannon Marcus	Episodes: "Bye, Bye, Love" and "Fate, Hope and Charity"
2003	Yes, Dear	Maryanne	Episode: "Sorority Girl"
2011	Can't Get Arrested	Jodie	Main role
2016–2020	Fuller House	Stephanie Tanner	Main role; Director: "The Nearlywed Game"
2021	Just Swipe	Vanessa	Film
2026	Vampirina: Teenage Vampire	The Sorcerer Queen (season 2)	recurring role

==== Reality television ====
Year	Title	Role	Notes
2007	Pants-Off Dance-Off	Host	Season 2
2013	The Eric Andre Show	Herself	Episode: "Jodie Sweetin; Vivica A. Fox"
2016	Dancing with the Stars	Herself	Contestant (season 22); finished in sixth place
2016	Hollywood Medium with Tyler Henry	Herself	Season 1: "Episode 3"
2017–2018	Hollywood Darlings	Herself	Main role
2017	Drop the Mic	Herself	Season 2: "Episode 6"
2018-2019	The Talk	Herself	Guest Panelist; 2 episodes
2022	Beyond the Edge	Herself	Contestant
2022	Worst Cooks in America	Herself	Contestant (season 24: "That's So '90s", celebrity edition 7)
2022	Name That Tune	Herself	Contestant (season 2: "Sitcom Stars and Olympic Legends")
2026	Totally 90s House	Herself	Contestant

== Awards and nominations ==
Award	Year	Category	Nominated work	Result	Ref.
Writers in Treatment's	2019	Experience, Strength and Hope Award		Won	
TV Land Award	2004	Quintessential Non-Traditional Family	Full House	Nominated	
Young Artist Award	1988	Outstanding Young Comedienne in a Television Series	Full House	Nominated	
Young Artist Award	1989	Outstanding Young Comedienne in a Television Series	Full House	Nominated	
Young Artist Award	1990	Outstanding Young Comedienne in a Television Series	Full House	Won	
Young Artist Award	1990	Outstanding Young Ensemble Cast in a Television Series	Full House	Nominated	
Young Artist Award	1991	Outstanding Young Comedienne in a Television Series	Full House	Nominated	
Young Artist Award	1991	Outstanding Young Ensemble Cast in a Television Series	Full House	Nominated	
Young Artist Award	1992		Full House	Nominated	
Young Artist Award	1993	Outstanding Young Comedienne in a Television Series	Full House	Nominated	
YoungStar Award	1995	Best Young Actress in a Comedy TV Series	Full House	Nominated	
YoungStar Award	1995	Best Young Ensemble Cast – Television	Full House	Nominated	
