= Hey, Rube! (band) =

English electronica collaboration

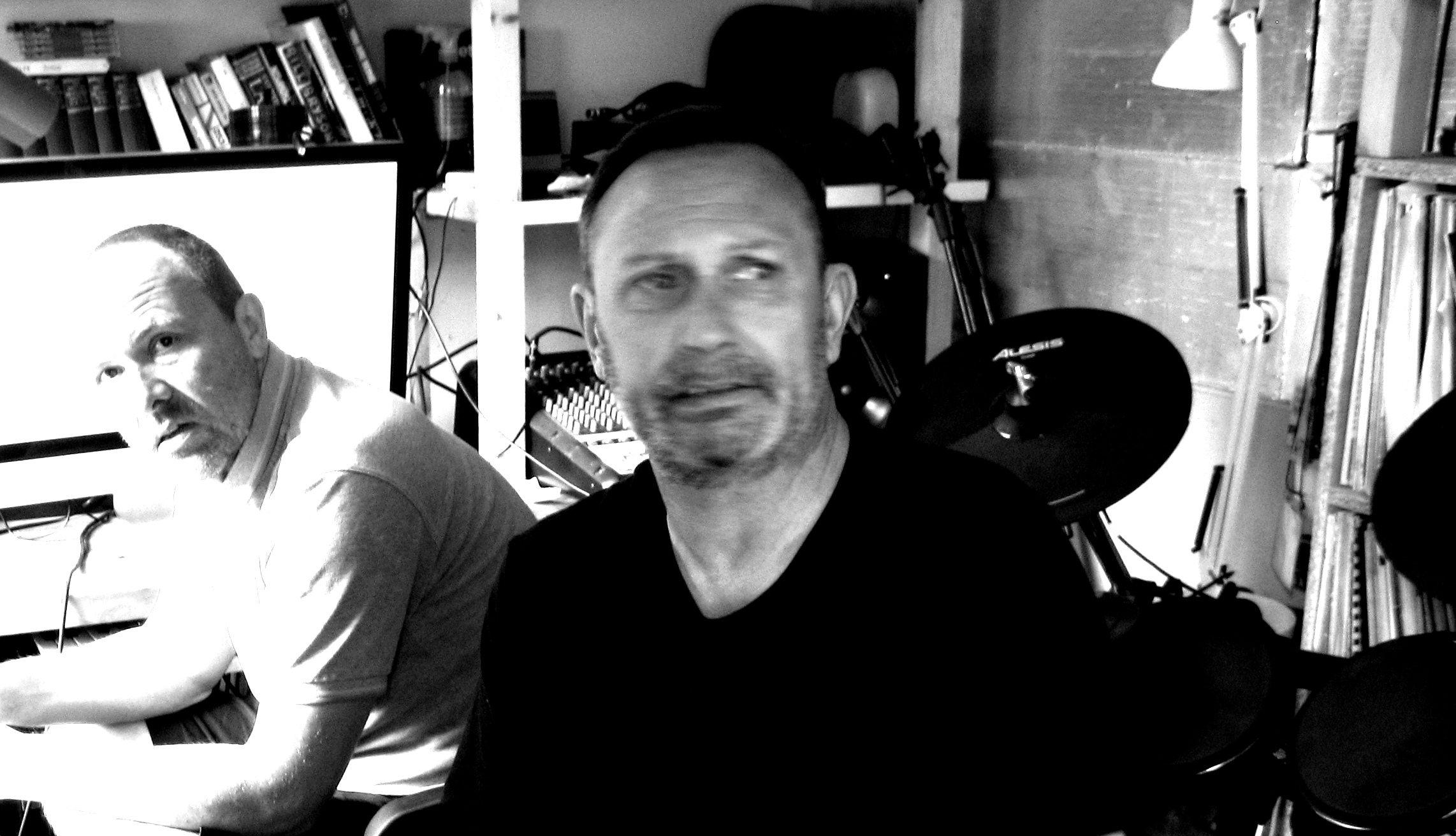
- Steve Cobby and Stephen Mallinder in The Shedio, Yorkshire, 2012

Background information
- Origin: Kingston upon Hull and Sheffield, England
- Genres: Dub, post-rock, experimental, electronic
- Years active: 2012–present
- Labels: Steel Tiger Records
- Members: Stephen Mallinder; Steve Cobby

Hey, Rube! is an electronica collaboration from Kingston upon Hull, East Riding of Yorkshire, England. It was formed by Stephen Mallinder, a founder of Cabaret Voltaire, and Steve Cobby, of The Cutler, The Heights of Abraham, Chieftain and J*S*T*A*R*S and half of Fila Brazillia. They play electronica and dub.

Formed in 2012, their debut release came the same year, on the electronica label Steel Tiger Records (based in Hull/Sheffield and established by Cobby with Sim Lister in 2006), with the album, Can You Hear Me Mutha?

On 26 October 2012, Greg Fenton wrote in Magazine Sixty, "The mere fact of a collaboration between Cabaret Voltaire’s Stephen Mallinder and Fila Brazillia’s Steve Cobby should speak volumes in itself... After all, Cabaret Voltaire where [sic] one of the UK’s chief instigators of electronic music from the late seventies, while Fila Brazillia carried the flag on into the 90’s and the 00’s [sic]."

In February 2013 the Electronic Rumours blog reviewed Can You Hear Me Mutha?, "Opening with the deliciously chaotic Rob A Bank Rob, which lobs frantic tribal drumming, ethereal chimes, Acidic bleeps and Mallinder’s Cabs rasp into a ring and let’s [sic] them sort things out amongst themselves, the album drops Mengi Dem Disco Leggi. A broken Balearic Boogie, like a Mediterranean robotic assault... Considering a few days ago we didn’t know this record existed, we are very glad to have been introduced to it. A glorious example of what happens when two talents are left to create freely."

The track "Mengi Dem Disco Leggi" from the album Can You Hear Me Mutha? was featured on Lauren Laverne's national radio show on BBC Radio 6 Music.

== Discography ==
=== Albums ===
- Can You Hear Me Mutha? (Steel Tiger Records ST013, 15 October 2012)

== See also ==
- Bands and musicians from Yorkshire and North East England
- List of independent UK record labels
- List of electronic music record labels
