= Luck Be a Lady =

Song from the 1950 musical Guys and Dolls

"Luck Be a Lady" is a song written and composed by Frank Loesser in 1950 for the musical Guys and Dolls.

In the musical, gambler Sky Masterson (first performed by Robert Alda) sings it and hopes that he will win a bet which will decide whether or not he is able to save his relationship with the girl of his dreams. The lyrics personifies his luck, called "Lady Luck", to be his date who by etiquette is expected to not abandon the gambler that night.

== Notable uses and recordings ==
- Marlon Brando sang the song in the Guys and Dolls (1955) film adaptation. In 2004, that version finished at No. 42 in AFI's 100 Years...100 Songs survey of top tunes in American cinema.
- Jack Jones recorded it for his album, Bewitched (1964), arranged by Shorty Rogers.
- Later, it became a signature song for Frank Sinatra (who also starred in Guys and Dolls 1955 film adaptation), first released on the compilation Reprise Musical Repertory Theatre (1963) and re-released on the album Sinatra '65: The Singer Today (1965). In June 2026, CBS News included Sinatra's version of the song in its list of the 250 essential American songs of the past 250 years.
- Barbra Streisand recorded the song for her album Back to Broadway (1993).
- Sinatra released it as a duet with Chrissie Hynde on Duets II (1994).
- Dee Snider performed it as a duet with Clay Aiken on Snider's album Dee Does Broadway (2012).
- The Cherry Poppin' Daddies recorded a version on their Rat Pack tribute Please Return the Evening (2014).
- Seal recorded it for his 2017 album Standards.

== In popular culture ==
Advertising

- In December 2011, Cîroc began airing an advertising campaign featuring Sean "Puff Daddy" Combs and others in scenes reminiscent of the original Rat Pack, with a recording of Frank Sinatra singing "Luck Be a Lady" playing throughout the commercial as mood music.

Films

- Frank Sinatra's version features prominently in the film Mrs. Doubtfire (1993), when Robin Williams' character, Daniel Hillard, is given a makeover to "become" a woman.
- The song was used in the original sound track from The Cooler (2003), a movie which deals with casino life (and death) in Las Vegas.

Music

- The electronica group Fila Brazillia references the song in the title of their album Luck Be a Weirdo Tonight (1997).

Television

- One line is sung by the Doctor in the Doctor Who episode, "Rose" (March 26, 2005).
- Full House season 2, episodes 43 and 44, titled "Luck Be a Lady" (Parts 1 and 2), aired April 28, 1989 and May 5, 1989, respectively.
- A cover of the song features in Lucifer, sung by the titular character.
- "Luck Be a Lady" (October 24, 2017) is the title of season 4, episode 72 of The Flash, and the song is featured in the opening scene of the episode.
- Brian Setzer performed the song on The L Word's soundtrack in season 4, episode 6: "Luck Be a Lady" (February 11, 2007).
- The song is parodied in The Simpsons episode "Mayored to the Mob" (December 20, 1998), as "Luke be a Jedi".
- The song is featured in the Family Guy episode "Roads to Vegas," which aired May 19, 2013.
- The song is featured briefly in The Marvelous Mrs. Maisel Season 3 Episode 3 "Panty Pose".
- The song is performed by Adam Arkin in the episode "Brain Salad Surgery" of Chicago Hope.
- The original version, sung by Robert Alda, is featured in the Fallout (American TV series) in season 2 episode 5, when the snake oil salesman (Jon Daly) is on his way to have intercourse with the robot prostitute F.I.S.T.O.
