= A Touch of Cloth (album) =

Studio album by Fila Brazillia
- Released: November 1, 1999
- Genre: Electronic
- Label: Pork Recordings

Fila Brazillia chronology
Power Clown (1998)	A Touch of Cloth (1999)	Jump Leads (2002)

A Touch of Cloth is the 1999 album by Fila Brazillia. The song "The Bugs Will Bite" was featured in the 2001 video game Mat Hoffman's Pro BMX as the main menu music.

== Critical reception ==
A Touch of Cloth
Review scores
Source	Rating
AllMusic	4/5 stars

AllMusic described the album as "solid". Exclaim! reviewed it as "working toward chills than spills" along with commenting on the "hard funk and guitar elements" that adds "luxurious grooves with Moog-ish keys and jazzy horns".

== Track listing ==
No.	Title	Length
1.	"The Bugs Will Bite"
2.	"Airlock Homes"
3.	"Ridden Pony"
4.	"Slow Light"
5.	"Swann Todd"
6.	"Snakeskin Bib"
7.	"XII"
8.	"Trivia"
9.	"Pigsblood and Chalk"
10.	"Dervish Controller"
11.	"Leonids"
12.	"Spores"
