= Black Market Gardening =

Studio album by Fila Brazillia
- Released: 11 November 1996
- Genre: Electronica
- Length: 1:04:08
- Label: Pork Recordings
- Producer: Fila Brazillia

Fila Brazillia chronology
Mess (1996)	Black Market Gardening (1996)	Luck Be a Weirdo Tonight (1997)

Professional ratings
Review scores
Source	Rating
AllMusic	4/5 stars

Black Market Gardening is an album by the British electronica group Fila Brazillia, released on Pork Recordings in 1996.

== Track listing ==
1. "Obrigado" – 3:53
2. "Snake Ranger" – 7:55
3. "Little Dipper" – 6:01
4. "Blubber Plinth" – 7:37
5. "Butter My Mask" – 9:14
6. "Wigs, Bifocals And Nurishment" – 8:08
7. "Xique-Xique" – 6:48
8. "Onc Mongaani" – 9:22
9. "July 23" – 5:14
