= Not My Job =

Not My Job may refer to:

- "Not My Job", a song by Flo from The Lead (2022)
- "Not My Job", a segment on NPR's radio program Wait Wait... Don't Tell Me!
- "Not My Job", a song on The Genie of the Lamp album by Mac Dre
- "It's Not My Job", an episode of Full House (season 2)
