= Misadventures in Babysitting =

Misadventures in Babysitting

- "Misadventures in Babysitting" (The Adventures of Super Mario Bros. 3), episode
- "Misadventures in Babysitting" (Full House episode)
- "Misadventures in Babysitting", the eighth episode of season 1 of Lizzie McGuire

== See also ==
- Adventures in Babysitting a 1987 American comedy film
  - Adventures in Babysitting (2016 film), a television film remake
