= Old Codes New Chaos =

Studio album by Fila Brazillia
- Released: August 1994
- Genres: Breakbeat, ambient, downtempo, trip hop
- Length: 76:47
- Label: Pork Recordings

Fila Brazillia chronology
Old Codes New Chaos (1994)	Maim That Tune (1996)

Professional ratings
Review scores
Source	Rating
AllMusic	2.5/5 stars
The Encyclopedia of Popular Music	4/5 stars

Old Codes New Chaos is the debut album by the British group Fila Brazillia. It was released on Pork Recordings in 1994. The title comes from a line in the 1991 book Lila: An Inquiry into Morals, by Robert Pirsig: "Rigel's interpretation of recent moral history is probably a pretty simple one: old codes vs. new chaos".

== Critical reception ==
Dean Carlson, in his review for AllMusic, wrote that "Old Codes, New Chaos may sound restrained compared to the creditable but not always successful moments of band's later eccentricity, but there's also a clean and bracing straightforwardness to its awkward downtempo that was often lacking in the band's slow development". Drum 'n' Bass: The Rough Guide praised "Pots and Pans", calling it a "stunning mixture of the Brazilian funk of Jorge Ben, the vocoded bass of Graham Central Station and House tempos".

== Track listing ==
1. "Old Codes" – 1:17
2. "Mermaids" – 6:16
3. "Whose Money" – 2:03
4. "Brazilification" – 8:40
5. "Serratia Marcescens" – 3:56
6. "The Sheriff" – 9:14
7. "Feinman" – 1:16
8. "The Light Of Jesus" – 8:41
9. "Strange Thoughts" – 5:26
10. "Fila Funk" – 18:53
11. "Pots & Pans" – 9:20
12. "New Chaos" – 1:45

The track "Feinman" features a quote from Richard Feynman, the last line of his report into the Space Shuttle Challenger disaster: "For a successful technology, reality must take precedence over public relations, for nature cannot be fooled".

== 20th Anniversary Remaster ==
The album was re-released on 12 June 2014, remastered in 24-bit fidelity and including 4 bonus tracks and a continuous mix.
