= Luck Be a Weirdo Tonight =

Studio album by Fila Brazillia
- Released: 23 June 1997
- Genre: Trip hop
- Length: 1:08:48
- Label: Pork Recordings
- Producer: Fila Brazillia

Fila Brazillia chronology
Black Market Gardening (1996)	Luck Be a Weirdo Tonight (1997)	Power Clown (1998)

Professional ratings
Review scores
Source	Rating
Allmusic	link
NME	6/10

Luck Be a Weirdo Tonight is an album by the British electronica group, Fila Brazillia, released on Pork Recordings in 1997. The title of the album comes from the lyrics of the 1950s song "Luck Be a Lady".

== Track listing ==
1. "Lieut. Gingivitis Shit" – 5:10
2. "Billy Goat Groupies" – 3:36
3. "Apehorn Concerto" – 6:15
4. "Hells Rarebit" – 7:34
5. "Her Majesties Hokey Cokey" – 4:35
6. "Rustic Bellyflop" – 4:39
7. "Van Allens Belt" – 9:54
8. "Pollo De Palo" – 6:29
9. "Heat Death Of The Universe" – 7:45
10. "Weasel Out The Muck" – 6:43
11. "Do The Hale-Bopp" – 6:08
