= Stephen Mallinder =

English artist and musician

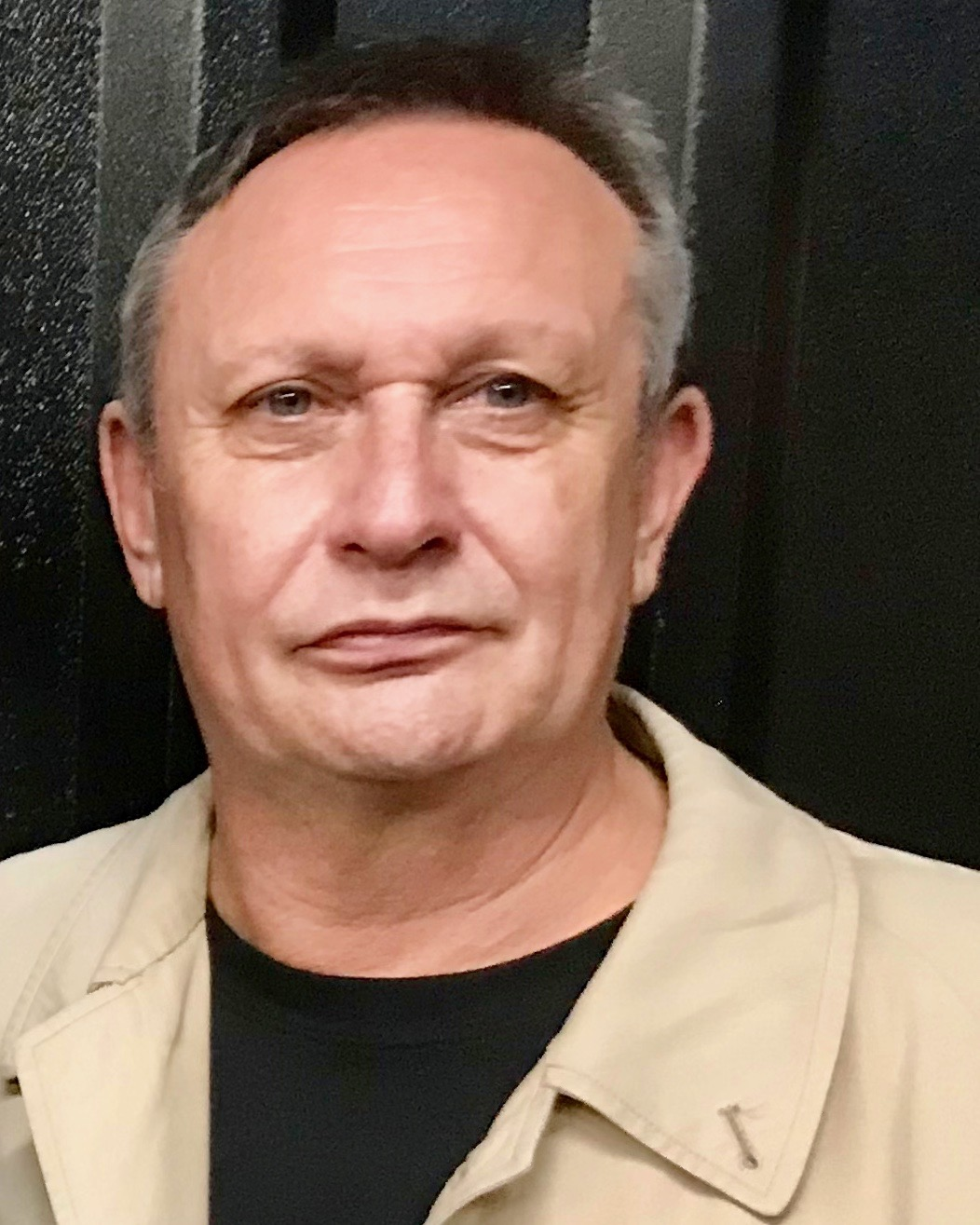
- Mallinder in 2022

Background information
- Born: Stephen William Mallinder; 1 January 1955 (age 71); Sheffield, South Yorkshire, England
- Genres: Industrial; post-punk; EBM; electro; acid house; techno
- Occupations: Musician; writer; DJ; academic
- Instruments: Vocals; bass guitar; percussion; keyboards; sampler
- Years active: 1973–present
- Labels: Rough Trade; Factory; Some Bizzare; Virgin; EMI; Plastex; Doublevision; Off World Sounds; Mute; dPulse; Steel Tiger; EnT-T; Memetune; Bella Union; Dais
- Formerly of: Cabaret Voltaire; Hey, Rube!; Acid Horse

Stephen William Mallinder (born 1 January 1955) is an English artist and musician who was a founding member of Cabaret Voltaire, and went on to work as Sassi & Loco, the Ku-Ling Bros., Hey, Rube!, Wrangler, and Creep Show.

== Biography ==
Mallinder co-founded Cabaret Voltaire in 1973.

=== Music ===
Mallinder recorded as a solo artist in the 1980s, including the Pow-Wow album, released in 1983. In 1988, he recorded with members of Soft Cell in the band Love Street, and in 1989, he was a member of Acid Horse, a band which also featured Al Jourgensen of Ministry.

Mallinder, alongside Richard H. Kirk, established the Western Works Studio (with Chris Watson until 1982) and subsequently produced in excess of 30 albums, working alongside producers and engineers including Flood, Adrian Sherwood, and Marshall Jefferson. He worked as producer, remixer, and live performer.

In 1982, Mallinder was one of the founders of Doublevision, which was the UK's first independent video label with an associated record label, Plastex Records in 1990. He is also the founder of the Off World Sounds label (Australia), releasing material under the names Ku-Ling Bros. and Sassi & Loco. Mallinder established Off World Productions in 1998.

=== Writing ===
He is a former journalist, including as a music journalist for Australian publications Ministry Magazine, Sunday Times and The West Australian, working also as a radio presenter and producer for RTRFM.

Stephen Mallinder wrote a chapter for the publication Resonances: Noise and Contemporary Music (ISBN 9781441159373), edited by Benjamin Halligan, Nicola Spelman and Michael Goddard for Continuum International Publishing Group (2013). The book is a collection of essays, proposing new critical approaches and inquiries regarding debate and analysis of noise – from postpunk to shoegaze and beyond. Punk and Post-Punk Noise, Chapter 5 by Stephen Mallinder, 'Sounds Incorporated: Dissonant Sorties into Popular Music'.

He wrote the Preface for Assimilate: A Critical History of Industrial Music, S. Alexander Reed Oxford University Press, 2013 and introductory chapter "Straight Connection back to Dusseldorf City" for German Pop Music: A Companion (editor Uwe Scutte) Penguin (2016).

He wrote "Live or Memorex: Artists and Producers Perceptions of Changing Music Practices" in The Digital Evolution of Live Music (Chandos 2015).

Mallinder contributed "Remix Chapter" for Total State Machine: Test Dept. (PC Press 2015).

=== Academic ===
Mallinder has published numerous academic papers, and gained his PhD in music and popular culture from Murdoch University in Australia in 2011 with his thesis Movement: Journey of the Beat. He now lives in Brighton and has been researching at the Art Design Media Centre and teaches on Digital Music & Sound Art at the University of Brighton.

Keynote addresses include "Life in Music" at the Red Bull Music Academy (Melbourne, 2006), "Signal to Noise (1973–83) Music Technology" (Sydney International Festival of the Arts 2010) and the first academic Kraftwerk conference: "Music, Modernity and Movement" (Aston University, 2015).

=== Current music projects ===
He has recorded with Steve Cobby – one half of Fila Brazillia – under the name Hey, Rube!. Can You Hear Me Mutha?, their debut album (on Steel Tiger Records), was released in October 2012. A series of further Hey, Rube! recordings were made for an anticipated 2013 release.

The debut Ku-Ling Bros. album Creach (2001) was reissued in the United States through dPulse, and was followed by the album, Here Come the Astronauts (2010).

In February 2014, he collaborated with producer/remixer Dub Mentor on the single "Obsession" – which included three versions of a Cabaret Voltaire track. The single was released on the alternative/minimalist independent music label EnT-T.

A new single, recorded with Steve Cobby, was scheduled for release in April 2016.

Mallinder worked with Phil Winter of Tunng and Benge (Expanding Records) under the name Wrangler, for the Memetune Label. They have released three albums LA Spark (2012), Sparked (2014), and White Glue (2016). Wrangler also worked with American artist John Grant under the name Creep Show, releasing the album Mr. Dynamite on the Bella Union label in 2018.

In 2014, members of Sheffield bands Clock DVA and In the Nursery joined Mallinder in a performance under the name IBBERSON. The performance took place at the newly built John Pemberton Lecture Theatres in the School of Health and Related Research at the University of Sheffield, which was constructed in the approximate location of Cabaret Voltaire's original Western Works studio. The name "IBBERSON" is a reference to a sign which used to hang outside the studio building.

He has worked with actress Jane Horrocks, writing music and performing, for the theatre production Cotton Panic, which debuted at Manchester International Festival in 2017.

He and Wrangler created the sci-fi film The Tourist (2017), with director Tash Tung performing a live soundtrack, for the Unfilmables project, which was conceived by Colm McAuliffe and produced by Live Cinema UK, alongside Mica and Francesca Levi.

As part of Cabaret Voltaire, Mallinder has had video work exhibited at MoMA in New York, and with Wrangler in the Turbines (Tate Modern, 2010).

On 2019, Mallinder was featured on a spoken word version of Anna Domino's "Lake" – done by Dub Mentor. The single was also released on EnT-T. In February 2020, he guest featured on "Hysteria (Wuhan Fight Dub)" by producer Dub Mentor, a track that was conceived on the way back from China.

== Solo discography ==
- "Temperature Drop" 12-inch single (1981), Fetish
- Pow-Wow album (1983), Fetish – reissued with extra tracks as Pow-Wow Plus (1985), Mute
- Um Dada album (2019), Dais Records
- Tick Tick Tick (2022), Dais Records

== See also ==
- Bands and musicians from Yorkshire and North East England
