= Full House season 3 =

Full House
- Season 3
- DVD cover
- Starring: John Stamos; Bob Saget; Dave Coulier; Candace Cameron; Jodie Sweetin; Mary-Kate and Ashley Olsen; Lori Loughlin
- No. of episodes: 24

Release
- Original network: ABC
- Original release: September 22, 1989 – May 4, 1990

Season chronology
- ← Previous; Season 2 Next → Season 4

The third season of Full House, an American family sitcom created by Jeff Franklin, premiered on ABC in the United States on September 22, 1989, and concluded on May 4, 1990. The season was partially directed by Franklin and produced by Jeff Franklin Productions, Miller-Boyett Productions, and Lorimar Television, with Don Van Atta as the producer. It consists of 24 episodes, most of which were directed by Bill Foster. From this season onward, Lori Loughlin is credited in the opening credits.

Set in San Francisco, the show chronicles widower father Danny Tanner, who, after the death of his wife Pam, enlisted his brother-in-law Jesse Katsopolis and his best friend Joey Gladstone to help raise his three daughters, D. J., Stephanie, and Michelle. In this season, Danny and Rebecca's talk show takes a spike in popularity, meanwhile Jesse and Rebecca continue dating while Jesse prepares to leave his rebellious ways in the past. Initially, it was planned that Becky would appear only in six episodes of season two, however, the producers found that the Tanner girls needed a mother figure. In the meantime, Joey searches for ways to launch his comedy career. The season also marks the first appearance of Comet, a dog the family adopts in "And They Call It Puppy Love". D. J. starts seventh grade and her first year of junior high, Stephanie enters the second grade, and Michelle gets her first bed and starts preschool.

By this season, the series' viewership increased, turning Full House into the most popular series of ABC's block TGIF; also, for the first time the series figured among the 30 highest-rated programs of the year. Critical reception was mixed, with critics regarding the sameness of the program, and praising towards the characters and actors performance.

== Cast ==
The season's main cast is John Stamos as Jesse, Bob Saget as Danny, Dave Coulier as Joey, Candace Cameron as D. J., Jodie Sweetin as Stephanie, and Mary-Kate and Ashley Olsen as Michelle. Additionally, Lori Loughlin returned as Rebecca "Becky" Donaldson, and, from this season, she had left the recurring cast to become part of the main cast. She appears in thirteen of the season's episodes.

The season's guest stars include Bobbie Eakes in "Breaking Up Is Hard to Do (in 22 Minutes)"; Doris Roberts as Claire, Danny's mother (replacing Alice Hirson, who played the role in the first season); Ed McMahon as himself, in the episode "Star Search"; Scott Baio in "Dr. Dare Rides Again"; and Mike Love of The Beach Boys in "Our Very First Telethon".

== Reception and release ==
=== Ratings ===
The Los Angeles Times states in a December 1989 article that Full House was "the most popular series on Friday night and the most popular of all among the 2-to-11 year-old set" at the time, with an average of 28% of the TV audience in its time slot reported in March 1990. The season three ratings did enter in the Top 30 highest-rated programs for the first time, coming in at number 22 for the 1989–90 season.

=== Critical reception ===
David Hofstede in the guide 5000 Episodes and No Commercials and Donald Liebenson of Barnes & Noble cited the fact that Michelle says her catchphrase "You got it, dude" for the first time as highlight of the season. It will become one of the most popular catchphrases in American television. Jeffrey Robinson from DVD Talk said that season three did not included different things for the series, with exception of actors' "over-the-top performances, which alone would be bad, but together make for some fun jokes." Robinson stated, "Overall season three is a nice addition to the Full House series." Similarly, Currentfilm.com praised the characters development, and the actors performance, as well as the screenplay that offers "a nicer balance of snap and sap than prior seasons." BuzzFeed placed "Tanner's Island", "Our Very First Telethon", "Honey, I Broke the House", and "Fraternity Reunion" respectively at numbers 7, 8, 14, and 16 on its list of The 19 Most WTF Moments From Full House.

== Episodes ==
No. overall	No. in season	Title	Directed by	Written by	Original release date	U.S. viewers (millions)	Rating/share (households) (Note: According to The Daily Union, Nielsen ratings of 1989–90 were based on 90.4 million households as of November 8, 1989, and 92.1 million as of November 22, 1989 issue.)
45	1	"Tanner's Island"	Bill Foster	Jeff Franklin	September 22, 1989	24.3	15.1/28
To celebrate the second anniversary of the day when Jesse and Joey moved in, Danny surprises the family (and Becky) with a special trip to Hawaii. Everyone is looking forward to soaking up some rays and having a great time, but Danny's pre-planned Clipboard of Fun puts a bit of a damper on things. Joey is determined to connect with a beautiful hula dancer that he meets on the first day, and Becky is not too pleased when her Elvis-obsessed boyfriend behaves like a complete wannabe throughout the vacation. The family friction reaches a new level when everyone gets stranded on an island because they didn't tie the rope right on the boat (Gilligan's Island-style), and with the adults fighting practically every minute of the day, the kids might need to do a little role reversal with the adults. Note: This episode premiered on the same day as the series premiere of Family Matters.
46	2	"Back to School Blues"	Bill Foster	Jeff Franklin	September 29, 1989	23.5	15.0/29
As the new school year begins, second-grader Stephanie is nervous about being without her older sister, who is now headed for junior high. Unfortunately for D.J., 7th grade causes a lot more than a few problems. Separated from her best friend and forced to eat lunch alone in a telephone booth after she discovers she is dressed like a teacher that everybody hates, she and Kimmy concoct a plan to fit in with the popular girls, but their methods don't exactly fly well with Danny, Joey, and Jesse. Meanwhile, to impress a client, Joey and Jesse dabble in some golf-a sport that does not exactly come naturally to Jesse. Note: This is the first time Michelle says “You got it, dude.”
47	3	"Breaking Up Is Hard to Do (in 22 Minutes)"	Bill Foster	Jeff Franklin	October 6, 1989	24.7	15.4/30
After enduring a rough horseback riding excursion with Becky, a frustrated Jesse refuses to participate in any future visits to the stable. Angry that he isn't willing to take part in more things that she enjoys, Becky gets even by skipping Jesse's music rehearsal, and when the two get into a heated argument, it looks like their relationship may be reaching the end. Upon hearing the news of their breakup, D.J.—who has formed a strong bond with Becky—teams up with Stephanie to get the adults back together. Meanwhile, Stephanie is elated when she finally loses her tooth, and after placing it under her pillow for the tooth fairy, she wakes up to a $20 bill on her bed. Also, the guys try to teach Michelle how to share after a bad play date. In the next episode Stephanie's artificial tooth was placed in after losing her real tooth.
48	4	"Nerd for a Day"	Bill Foster	Lenny Ripps	October 13, 1989	23.0	14.8/29
When Jesse learns that Stephanie has been joining her classmates in making fun of another child, he takes up the responsibility of encouraging his young niece to apologize and change her behavior. She goes along with it to obey her uncle, but when Walter Berman (a.k.a. "Duckface") believes that Stephanie may have romantic feelings for him, she resents Jesse's involvement in the situation-until one little incident teaches Stephanie how much it hurts to be the target of teasing. Meanwhile, D.J. selects Michelle as her subject for a unique school assignment, and Joey temporarily steps in for Becky as Danny's co-host on Wake Up, San Francisco.
49	5	"Granny Tanny"	Bill Foster	Marc Warren & Dennis Rinsler	October 20, 1989	25.3	16.0/30
When Danny's mother (Doris Roberts) arrives for an extended visit, the family realizes that as a divorced woman with independent children, Claire's recent retirement has left her feeling useless. To help her through this difficult time, Danny convinces everyone to act as if they can't function without Grandma. Leaving a few dirty dishes in the sink and allowing Claire to pick out a new bed for Michelle seem relatively harmless, but the little plan backfires when Claire decides that she should move in permanently. Will her precious baby boy have the courage to confront her with the truth about his foolish behavior? Meanwhile, Michelle is initially thrilled about getting out of her crib and having a brand-new "big girl bed," but when she gets scared, Jesse ends up having to sleep with her through the first night.
50	6	"Star Search"	Bill Foster	Kim Weiskopf	November 3, 1989	25.9	15.7/28
After watching a fateful videotape from his college days, Joey is reminded of a little deal he made with himself several years ago: if he didn't become a successful comedian within ten years, he would drop it all and try something new. With his self-implemented deadline just two weeks away, Joey goes full-force with his practicing and, with the loving support of his family, lands a spot on an upcoming episode of Star Search. Joey is up against some of the best talent in the area, but with his own unique abilities, will he manage to endure the pressure and pull off a victory? Special guest star: Ed McMahon as himself
51	7	"And They Call It Puppy Love"	Bill Foster	Rob Dames	November 10, 1989	25.0	14.8/26
It's been obvious for a while that the Tanner family could use a good dog, but when an Ohio-native Golden Retriever shows up in the backyard, Joey and the kids do their best to hide "Minnie" from Danny and Jesse. The secret is eventually unleashed, of course, but the family faces an even bigger issue when they find out that Minnie is expecting puppies. Meanwhile, Jesse has trouble staying focused on studying for a license renewal, and after Minnie gives birth, her owner arrives to bring them all home-but not before making a special offer to the Tanners to adopt one of them. Note: This episode introduces Comet, the family dog.
52	8	"Divorce Court"	Jeff Franklin	Marc Warren & Dennis Rinsler	November 17, 1989	24.1	15.0/26
Family discord is not usually in high supply within the Tanner household, but trouble begins when D.J. and Stephanie-who haven't been getting along too well recently-duke it out over privacy issues in their shared bedroom. Frustrated that her big sister doesn't appreciate her, Stephanie impulsively moves in with little Michelle, a decision she soon regrets. Of course, the kids aren't the only ones at odds with each other; Danny, Jesse, and Joey go on live air with Wake Up, San Francisco, challenge one another to a footrace, and set out to prove who is the most physically strong. After the race the boys attempt to play court to mediate the situation between Stephanie and D.J.
53	9	"Dr. Dare Rides Again"	Bill Foster	Rob Dames	November 24, 1989	23.5	13.5/24
When an old friend of Jesse's, Pete Bianco, drops in unexpectedly, it is a nostalgic trip down memory lane as they reminisce about their reckless days from the past. Initially, it is all in good fun when Pete teases Jesse about "going from Dr. Dare to Dr. Seuss", but Jesse—who misses being young and wants to prove that he's still in touch with his old wild spirit—nearly risks everything when he plans to attempt a dangerous motorcycling stunt. Meanwhile, Michelle is not too happy when Comet laps up her ice cream. She ultimately forgives him with a little help from Joey. Guest Star: Scott Baio as Pete
54	10	"The Greatest Birthday on Earth"	Bill Foster	Jeff Franklin	December 1, 1989	26.1	16.0/29
With Michelle's birthday quickly approaching, the entire family is enthusiastic about planning her circus party-all except for Jesse, that is, who has never been very fond of clowns. D.J. dresses up as a lion trainer, with Comet as her subject, and Stephanie eagerly attempts to improve her juggling skills. Disaster hits when Jesse takes Stephanie and Michelle with him to the gas station on the morning of the big day, and as a sea of kids show up at the Tanner house expecting entertainment, Jesse—who is locked in a dirty gas station with his two young nieces—must come up with some creative solutions to cheer up the birthday girl.
55	11	"Aftershocks"	Bill Foster	Jeff Franklin & Lenny Ripps	December 8, 1989	26.3	16.1/28
In the wake of a frightening earthquake, Danny is initially willing to deny Stephanie's excessive clinginess. It all seems relatively harmless to him at first, but Danny finally recognizes the seriousness of the situation when his distraught daughter won't even let him go on a business dinner for a few hours. Unable to get Stephanie to share her feelings with him, Danny reluctantly agrees that this is not something that a dad can handle on his own. Meanwhile, D.J.—who wakes up one morning with a zit on her nose—nervously anticipates her role in a school play. Guest Star: Nancy Dussault
56	12	"Joey & Stacey and ... Oh, Yeah, Jesse"	Bill Foster	Doug McIntyre	December 15, 1989	20.9	13.4/23
Jesse concocts an idea for a commercial and teams up with Joey to pitch it to their client, but it is soon rejected. When one of the commercial's backup singers notices how Jesse takes charge and shoots down every attempt that Joey makes to offer his input, she encourages Joey to be bolder and make himself heard. Joey soon forms a romantic relationship with Stacy (Kari Michaelsen), and her support prompts him to introduce his own commercial idea without consulting Jesse first. Furious when Joey's presentation is lapped up by their client, a jealous Jesse gets into a huge fight with Joey-developments that could stand to destroy their friendship. Back at home, Stephanie is devastated when Comet chews up her beloved Mr. Bear, and by watching her two sisters step in to help repair the damage, Jesse just might be motivated to clean up the mess that he has made with Joey.
57	13	"No More Mr. Dumb Guy"	Bill Foster	Marc Warren & Dennis Rinsler	January 5, 1990	26.6	16.4/28
Jesse is invited by Becky to a literature soiree, but he declines, believing that his lack of formal education wouldn't serve him too well among the other guests. Later, when Jesse feels threatened by a handsome and apparently flirtatious former professor of Becky's, he shows up at the event with an attitude that just might destroy his relationship with his girlfriend. Back at the Tanner house, Danny is thrilled when a co-worker graciously accepts his invitation for a dinner date, and D.J. and Stephanie live to regret bringing their little sister into the verbal insult business.
58	14	"Misadventures in Baby-Sitting"	Bill Foster	Shari Scharfer & Julie Strassman	January 12, 1990	27.0	16.9/29
Eager to have her very own phone line installed in her bedroom after realizing she's using up everyone's phone time, D.J. proposes that she do some babysitting to help pay for it-a plan that Danny is willing to consider. Spending an evening with Brian does not seem too difficult at first, but he gets his head stuck between the stairwell railings. Back at the Tanner house, Stephanie experiences her own babysitting woes when she is placed in charge of Michelle, and an innocent card-playing session with some buddies gets Jesse in some hot water with Becky and Danny unsuccessfully being a "guy" for a night.
59	15	"Lust in the Dust"	Tom Rickard	Bobby Fine & Gigi Vorgan	January 26, 1990	27.7	17.5/30
Stephanie's beautiful young dancing instructor seems like the ideal match for free agent Danny, but because he has a reputation for finding multiple reasons not to put himself out there, his daughters take it upon themselves to arrange a little date at the house. Sure enough, after sparks fly between them at the lunch table, Danny and Karen spend a wonderful day together, but there is just one thing about this girl that may send Danny running as fast as he can. Meanwhile, Jesse is miserably late for an important rehearsal because his keys are missing, and the notoriously sneaky Michelle is branded as the culprit.
60	16	"Bye, Bye Birdie"	Jeff Franklin	Lenny Ripps	February 2, 1990	26.2	16.7/28
Michelle is too eager to sleep the night before her first day of preschool, and when she finally arrives in the classroom the next morning, her happiness is squashed when she is involved in an unfortunate incident with the class bird. Feeling that nobody likes her, Michelle stubbornly refuses to go back-an idea that Jesse accepts, since he understands what it is like to be an outcast at school. After Danny makes it clear that this is not a viable option, the adults must devise a plan to ease young Michelle back into the preschool that once excited her. Meanwhile, Stephanie gets herself in some hot water when her latest attempts to read D.J.'s diary backfire miserably.
61	17	"13 Candles"	Bill Foster	Kim Weiskopf	February 9, 1990	26.0	15.7/28
When her 13th birthday arrives, D.J. celebrates with a fabulous boy-girl party at the house. The friendly and handsome Kevin Gwynn is in attendance, but when D.J. is too shy to talk to him, Kimmy conspires with the rest of the guests to arrange for Kevin to lock lips with the birthday girl. After the plan backfires, thanks to her eavesdropping father, uncle, and bodyguard, D.J. is left feeling humiliated. Who will step in to comfort her in the absence of her mother?
62	18	"Mr. Egghead"	Bill Foster	Rob Dames	February 16, 1990	25.6	15.8/28
Joey is anxious to prove himself as the new star of the educational children's show Mr. Egghead, but what he does not seem to understand is that the job requires a little more than just liking kids. With Stephanie's second grade class serving as the audience for a test run show that will determine Joey's eligibility for the position, an experiment goes wrong and leaves Stephanie with a broken nose-the day before she is scheduled to have her Class Picture Day! Meanwhile, while Stephanie laments over the inevitable teasing that she will encounter at school, Danny and D.J. must use all the tricks in the book to appeal a driving ticket that they received while on the road.
63	19	"Those Better Not Be the Days"	Bill Foster	Marc Warren & Dennis Rinsler	February 23, 1990	25.1	15.4/27
The girls' recent bouts of greediness are one thing, but when they stop saying "thank you" altogether, a new game is concocted to teach them a lesson. Everyone switches roles for the day, giving D.J. and Stephanie the opportunity to act as "parents" to Danny, Jesse, and Joey. When the plan backfires, the guys nervously imagine their long-term future as the kids' personal slaves. The result is a confrontation about the girls' behavior and they realize that the point of the game was to show it. The girls finally apologize and promise to tone their greedy behavior down. Note: Adult Michelle is played by Jayne Modean, Dave Coulier's then real-life wife.
64	20	"Honey, I Broke the House"	Bill Foster	Kim Weiskopf	March 9, 1990	26.2	15.9/29
Stephanie climbs into Joey's brand-new car-and ends up crashing it through the kitchen wall. Terrified to face anyone, she decides that bolting to Mexico might be the best option. Meanwhile, as everyone experiences very different reactions to the kitchen's newest little decoration, Jesse gets a bout of jealousy as Becky plans a date with a smooth-talking football stud.
65	21	"Just Say No Way"	Jeff Franklin	Jeff Franklin	March 30, 1990	23.5	16.3/27
After weeks of planning and organizing a school dance, D.J. is disappointed to learn that the scheduled band cannot perform. After convincing Jesse to lend his musical talents for the evening, D.J. preps herself for the big event by asking her biggest crush, Kevin Gwynn, to be her escort (with a little unsolicited help from Stephanie). Trouble flares at the dance when Kevin seems uncomfortable and Jesse meets the questionable back-up band that D.J. arranged for him. Jesse is willing to be a good sport at first, but nothing can prevent this former "bad boy" from blowing up when he catches his young niece with a beer in her hand thinking that she was drinking when she really was not, even though she's only 13. Could D.J. really be headed in such a dangerous direction? Back at home, Joey presents Michelle with a tape recording of the popular children's song "Baby Beluga"—a decision that he lives to regret, because the more she plays it, the more it drives everyone in the house crazy. Back at the school, Kevin tells Jesse and Danny that D.J. was not drinking, and that it was actually him and two other boys. She was trying to stop them. Jesse then apologizes to D.J. for falsely accusing her of drinking.
66	22	"Three Men and Another Baby"	Bill Foster	Lenny Ripps	April 13, 1990	21.9	14.4/28
Danny agrees to do some neighbors a favor by babysitting their baby son Tony for the day, but when Danny is too busy working to take care of the child, he asks Jesse to step in and help. Miraculously, Jesse warms up to Tony and starts bonding with him, but little Michelle is not too willing to share the attention of her doting uncle. Afraid that Jesse doesn't love her anymore, she takes drastic measures to make sure all eyes stay focused on her. Meanwhile, D.J. requests Joey's help in completing a tricky math problem, but when he can't seem to figure it out himself, he resorts to phoning in for some help from a very unlikely source: the Nut Store.
67	23	"Fraternity Reunion"	Bill Foster	David Ketchum & Tony DiMarco	April 27, 1990	20.3	13.8/28
As Danny and Joey prepare for a 10-year reunion with their former college fraternity, they dress for the event. But instead of normal clothes, they dress in pearl earrings, fancy dressings, and even feminine hosiery! Oh, the things a couple of men will do to gain revenge on a sorority that stole their fraternity mascot a decade ago! D.J. and Kimmy watch the news for a school paper but Kimmy changes the channel to the Top 10 Video Countdown. The girls come up with a plan to bring the TV upstairs so they can watch two shows at the same time. At this point, Stephanie catches them in the act, and asks them to use the little TV in the bedroom instead. Kimmy accidentally ends up breaking the Tanner's television and is not allowed to have any contact with D.J. for three weeks. While trying to steal back their fraternity mascot, Danny and Joey wind up in jail, which means D.J. has to come and bail them out. With no one to watch Michelle and Stephanie, D.J. hires a very unlikely source to watch the girls. Meanwhile, Michelle learns to play the game of patty-cake.
68	24	"Our Very First Telethon"	Bill Foster	Lenny Ripps & Shari Scharfer & Julie Strassman	May 4, 1990	20.7	13.9/27
A special "We Love Our Children" telethon features Danny as the host, and the rest of the family pitches in to make the next 24 hours successful by raising $1 million for the fund. Jesse and his band perform, Joey exercises his comedy skills, and the adorable Tanner girls capture the heart of the telethon with their singing and dancing. As the monetary donations gradually rise, they hit a snag in the middle of the show when Danny suddenly falls asleep. Guest Star: Mike Love of The Beach Boys

== DVD release ==
Warner Home Video released a DVD box set containing all third-season episodes on April 4, 2006 only on Region 1.

Full House: The Complete Third Season
Set details
Special features
- 24 episodes
- 4-disc set
- 1.33:1 aspect ratio
- Subtitles: English, Spanish, French
- English (Dolby Digital 2.0 Mono)
- "Joey Impersonations", a montage of Dave Coulier's comic impersonations
Release dates
Region 1
April 4, 2006
