= Full House season 4 =

Full House
- Season 4
- DVD cover
- Starring: John Stamos; Bob Saget; Dave Coulier; Candace Cameron; Jodie Sweetin; Mary-Kate and Ashley Olsen; Lori Loughlin
- No. of episodes: 26

Release
- Original network: ABC
- Original release: September 21, 1990 – May 3, 1991

Season chronology
- ← Previous; Season 3 Next → Season 5

The fourth season of the family sitcom Full House originally aired on ABC from September 21, 1990 to May 3, 1991. The entire season was directed by Joel Zwick.

== Plot ==
Starting in season four, Danny realizes that he must start disciplining Michelle. Jesse proposes to Becky and they soon become married. Joey's career takes a turn for the better when he is offered a job in Las Vegas to open for Wayne Newton. In the season finale, Becky finds out that she is pregnant as Jesse tells her, he wants to go on tour with his band. D. J. begins eighth grade, Stephanie goes to third grade, and Michelle enters her final year of preschool.

== Main cast ==
- John Stamos as Jesse Katsopolis
- Bob Saget as Danny Tanner
- Dave Coulier as Joey Gladstone
- Candace Cameron as D. J. Tanner
- Jodie Sweetin as Stephanie Tanner
- Mary-Kate and Ashley Olsen as Michelle Tanner
- Lori Loughlin as Rebecca "Becky" Donaldson

== Episodes ==
No. overall	No. in season	Title	Directed by	Written by	Original release date	U.S. viewers (millions)
69	1	"Greek Week"	Joel Zwick	Jeff Franklin	September 21, 1990	23.1
Jesse's Greek grandparents come to San Francisco to celebrate their 50th wedding anniversary, but things go rather crazy when both Jesse and D.J. "marry" other visitors. After a walk around the kitchen table, one of Jesse's old girlfriends, Elena Banalakis calls him her husband and her younger brother Sylvio calls D.J. his wife. During the anniversary, Jesse and D.J. dump their spouses and Jesse proposes to Becky, who says yes. Note: Mary-Kate and Ashley Olsen play Michelle and Melina in this episode. It is the second time that the two are shown on screen together in the series. (They are also seen together in the season 1 episode "The Seven Month Itch (Part 1)", in the season 5 episode "The Devil Made Me Do It" and in the last aired episode "Michelle Rides Again, Part 2".)
70	2	"Crimes and Michelle's Demeanor"	Joel Zwick	Scott Spencer Gorden	September 28, 1990	22.2
When Michelle starts pushing the boundaries, Danny must discipline her sometime. Meanwhile, Jesse's attempts to buy an expensive engagement ring for Becky leads him to sell a valuable item.
71	3	"The I.Q. Man"	Joel Zwick	Marc Warren & Dennis Rinsler	October 5, 1990	23.1
Jesse is chosen to be the star in a cologne commercial, but he feels like he is not being treated fairly, when his wardrobe is stripped. After a series of calamities, Joey and Jesse quit working for Malatesta and form their own business, with a loan from Danny. Meanwhile, Danny and Becky find themselves as replacements for Connie Chung on Career Day, when D.J. and Kimmy find out they were scammed by a friend who wasn't even related to Chung, and Stephanie has a terrible cold, so Michelle tries to take care of her.
72	4	"Slumber Party"	Joel Zwick	Martie Cook	October 12, 1990	23.4
Joey volunteers to take Stephanie to her first mother-daughter sleepover party after Becky is unable to take her due to her car breaking down. Danny goes through some old memories as Jesse and Joey move their productions into the attic, and Danny tries to let go of his precious items.
73	5	"Good News, Bad News"	Joel Zwick	Ellen Guylas	October 19, 1990	22.1
DJ is promoted to newspaper editor and has Kimmy do sports, but after Kimmy screws up her first assignment, the two go into bitter newspaper and oral arguments. Meanwhile, Danny and Becky go through creative differences when filming a promo for Wake Up, San Francisco produced by Jesse and Joey. Elsewhere, Stephanie tries to avoid Michelle during a game of "Shadow" which involves Michelle copying every word that Stephanie says and copying her every move.
74	6	"A Pinch for a Pinch"	Joel Zwick	Charles A. Pratt, Jr.	October 26, 1990	24.5
Jesse accompanies Michelle to preschool since he has to fill in for Joey, only to pull her out after an argument with the teacher and Michelle pinching Aaron after he pinched her. Meanwhile, Stephanie fears the worst after reading her horoscope from the middle school newspaper and Joey gets a filling.
75	7	"Viva Las Joey"	Joel Zwick	Marc Warren & Dennis Rinsler	November 2, 1990	24.3
Joey performs in Las Vegas, but – surprisingly – comes face-to-face with his strict, estranged father, Colonel Gladstone. Guest star: Wayne Newton (whom Joey opens up for in Vegas) Absent: Lori Loughlin as Rebecca "Becky" Donaldson
76	8	"Shape Up"	Joel Zwick	Jeff Franklin	November 9, 1990	26.0
D.J. tries to lose weight for Kimmy's pool party, but her choice of an exercise routine includes no food for several days, which puts her at a dangerous risk and Stephanie in a bad position.
77	9	"One Last Kiss"	Joel Zwick	Leslie Ray & David Steven Simon	November 16, 1990	26.6
Jesse attends his ten-year high school reunion, but reunites with his old girlfriend, Carrie (Erika Eleniak) - even though he is engaged to Becky. In the sub-plot, Stephanie hosts a birthday party for Comet. The birthday party then becomes a search party when one of the dogs goes missing. It turns out that Michelle took one of the dogs as her own as she thinks Comet is too big for her.
78	10	"Terror in Tanner Town"	Joel Zwick	Boyd Hale	November 23, 1990	25.1
Rusty, the son of Danny's girlfriend, Cindy, pulls a number of pranks on the Tanners, such as Danny getting his hair green from the shampoo, Jesse spilling salt, Joey spilling milk, Danny having the tablecloth tucked into his pants and pulling the dinner off the table, giving D.J. and Stephanie gum that blackens their teeth, Rusty feeding Comet the rump roast while D.J. and Stephanie are washing him, locking Jesse, Becky, Stephanie, and D.J. in their rooms (using a jump rope), taping over Joey's tape, making Danny fall into a mud puddle while he and Rusty are playing football and getting Michelle's eye painted black from looking into his kaleidoscope. Danny learns that he's been doing all that because his parents are divorced and he wants his parents to get back together. In the end the sisters pull the perfect prank on him for revenge: When he opens the cupboard, Michelle starts spraying whipped cream and her sisters join in.
79	11	"Secret Admirer"	Joel Zwick	Ellen Guylas	December 7, 1990	23.9
During the Tanners' family picnic, Rusty – intrigued by D.J.'s liking for Ricky, the paperboy – types a love note for D.J. as a prank, and tells Michelle to give it to her sister and say it's from the paperboy. However, Michelle mistakenly gives it to Stephanie and says it's from Rusty. Through a chain reaction, Stephanie believes that Rusty loves her, Danny's girlfriend, Cindy, believes that Joey loves her, Joey believes Cindy loves him, Becky believes that Danny loves her, Kimmy believes that Jesse loves her, Jesse believes that either Danny or Joey is in love with Becky, Danny and Joey both believe that Becky loves them, and, ironically fooled by his own prank, Rusty believes that D.J. loves him. Finally, Michelle tells them that Rusty typed the note, and they all chase him (except for D.J., who didn't know about Rusty's love note prank, but instead had a nice picnic for two with Ricky). This episode was implied to be a spoof of Secret Admirer, a 1985 film in which Lori Loughlin, who plays Becky, co-starred.
80	12	"Danny in Charge"	Joel Zwick	Story by : Stacey Hur; Teleplay by : Boyd Hale & Scott Spencer Gorden	December 14, 1990	18.8
While Jesse and Joey are out of town, Danny tries to become "Superdad" and spend time with his daughters "all by himself", but problems ensue when he finds that he has two events at the same time. Stephanie wants him to come to her science fair and D.J. wants him to come to her drama festival. Meanwhile Jesse and Joey attempt to film a fox in the wilderness for an advertisement. Michelle turns four in the beginning of the episode, finishing her birthday cake in bed after the guys tuck her in. Note: Becky is not in this episode, although there is a scene where Danny is speaking to her on the phone. Absent: Lori Loughlin as Rebecca “Becky” Donaldson
81	13	"Happy New Year"	Joel Zwick	Jeff Franklin	December 28, 1990	28.3
Danny and Jesse set up Joey with a date for New Year's Eve, but he becomes so smitten with her that he wants to elope. Meanwhile, Rusty convinces Stephanie that he is going to kiss her at midnight, but when midnight comes and Rusty reveals he was just kidding, Stephanie ends up kissing him. Elsewhere, Michelle tries practicing saying "Happy New Year" for the big occasion, irritating Stephanie as Michelle repeats the phrase indefinitely. When the occasion comes, she is tired and doesn't say it.
82	14	"Working Girl"	Joel Zwick	Marc Warren & Dennis Rinsler	January 4, 1991	27.7
Danny allows D.J. to get her first job to earn money for the new sneakers she really wants, as long as she can keep her grades up. But D.J. is in a lot of trouble when she gets an "F" on her science test and Kimmy changes it to look like an "A." Meanwhile, Michelle drives everyone crazy with politeness week at preschool. Also, Becky and Jesse attempt to agree on a place for their wedding before finally deciding to marry in San Francisco, thanks to a suggestion from Joey.
83	15	"Ol' Brown Eyes"	Joel Zwick	Ellen Guylas & Boyd Hale	January 11, 1991	29.0
Danny wants to sing with Jesse's band at D.J.'s school fundraiser to prove to D.J. that he can be "hip and cool", but D.J. is totally humiliated by the idea. Meanwhile, Michelle hides Jesse's ring when no one else wants to play "hot and cold" with her, and her game with Joey goes awry when the ring is gone. Note: After the opening scene of this episode, Danny's hair appears to be styled somewhat differently than before.
84	16	"Stephanie Gets Framed"	Joel Zwick	Doug McIntyre	January 25, 1991	28.4
Stephanie has to get a pair of eyeglasses, which makes her feel "like a geek". When Julie's (D.J.'s friend) cousin, Steve Urkel is in San Francisco for the big science fair, Julie and D.J. get irritated with him, and he meets Danny and Jesse who are also irritated by him; later, he meets Michelle, who he finds has a lot in common with him about money. When Stephanie meets Steve, he helps her out with her glasses dilemma. Taking his advice, she borrows all of Joey's funny glasses, but the teacher confiscates them. Meanwhile, Michelle learns how to use a piggy bank. Jesse is confused about whom to pick for his best man – Joey or Danny. Special guest star: Jaleel White in a crossover appearance as his character from Family Matters, Steve Urkel
85	17	"A Fish Called Martin"	Joel Zwick	Leslie Ray & David Steven Simon	February 1, 1991	26.6
Michelle wins a goldfish at a carnival, but then gives it its first – and last – bubble bath, and it dies. Later, Danny gives her a big fish tank, but she is worried that she will kill another innocent fish. In the subplot, Becky teaches the family (and a reluctant Jesse) square dancing for their upcoming wedding.
86	18	"The Wedding – Part 1"	Joel Zwick	Jeff Franklin	February 8, 1991	27.7
Jesse and Becky's wedding day arrives, but problems ensue: Michelle reunites with her old friend and Becky's nephew Howie (from the Season 2 episode "Baby Love"), but each of them do not remember each other and go through a phase of dislike of the opposite sex; Becky's parents Nedra and Kenneth visit, but Jesse cannot get along with his future father-in-law. Later, a talk with Kenneth the night before the wedding makes Jesse become nervous about possibly losing his life when Kenneth tells him that marrying someone means settling down, as Kenneth retired from the rodeo circuit after marriage. So in an attempt to have "one last adventure" as a single man, Jesse has Joey take him parachuting, which ends up with him getting stuck in a tree. Note: Actress Lori Loughlin uses the same wedding dress she wore for her first wedding in this two-part episode.
87	19	"The Wedding – Part 2"	Joel Zwick	Jeff Franklin	February 15, 1991	30.6
Continuing from the previous episode, Jesse remains caught in a tree after jumping out of Joey's airplane. He eventually gets down, but ends up in jail for smashing Farmer Bob's tomatoes in "Tomato Country" and for trying to steal the farmer's truck. Becky goes to bail Jesse out, and in the end, they finally marry, and Jesse plays the song "Forever" for her. After the party, Jesse and Becky ride off on Jesse's motorcycle to go on their honeymoon. Note: The local sheriff is played by Kin Shriner, John Stamos' former General Hospital co-star. Actual baby, childhood and teen pictures of John Stamos and Lori Loughlin are shown as Jesse sings "Forever" at the wedding.
88	20	"Fuller House"	Joel Zwick	Leslie Ray & David Steven Simon	February 22, 1991	29.3
Now a married man, Jesse moves out of the Tanners' house, only to realize that he misses his family very much, especially Michelle; Becky comes up with a solution: moving into the attic while Joey moves into Jesse's old room. In the sub-plot, Stephanie struggles to learn fractions. Note: This episode premiered around 25 years before the sequel series of the same name was released on Netflix.
89	21	"The Hole-in-the-Wall Gang"	Joel Zwick	Craig Heller & Guy Schulman	March 1, 1991	29.9
D.J. and Stephanie accidentally put a hole in Danny's bedroom wall during a fight. Meanwhile, Jesse attempts to make a makeshift apartment in the attic for him and Becky.
90	22	"Stephanie Plays the Field"	Joel Zwick	Mark Fink	March 8, 1991	28.1
Stephanie becomes the new star pitcher for Danny's Little League Baseball team, but her "boyfriend" Brett, who's on their rival team, tries to bribe her into throwing him "easy pitches". Along the way, Jesse and Becky have a hard time turning away Michelle so they can have private time together.
91	23	"Joey Goes Hollywood"	Joel Zwick	Leslie Ray & David Steven Simon	March 29, 1991	27.1
Joey auditions for a television sitcom, Surf's Up, which stars Frankie Avalon and Annette Funicello. Also, Stephanie wants to change her first name after continuous taunting, and Michelle is running up the phone bill by calling Tokyo, Japan.
92	24	"Girls Just Wanna Have Fun"	Joel Zwick	Marc Warren & Dennis Rinsler	April 1, 1991	25.5
D.J. has Becky cover for her while she sneaks out to see a boy she likes. Meanwhile, back at the Tanner household, Stephanie teaches Michelle a lesson about fibbing, and Danny shows off his billiard skills when Jesse gets a pool table.
93	25	"The Graduates"	Joel Zwick	Ellen Guylas	April 26, 1991	23.1
Feeling that his youth is fleeting as his daughters are moving up one grade level, Danny tries to be young again by "hanging out" with a college student. D.J. makes a speech for her junior high graduation, and Jesse helps with Michelle's preschool graduation song. Stephanie feels left out because (in Danny's words) she's "only" going from third to fourth grade, and wishes she could have a cap/gown graduation like D.J. and Michelle for going into "upper elementary".
94	26	"Rock the Cradle"	Joel Zwick	Boyd Hale	May 3, 1991	23.8
Jesse and his band are going on tour for the summer, but plans change when Jesse and the family find out that Becky is pregnant.

== See also ==
- List of Full House episodes
