= Steve Cobby =

British musician

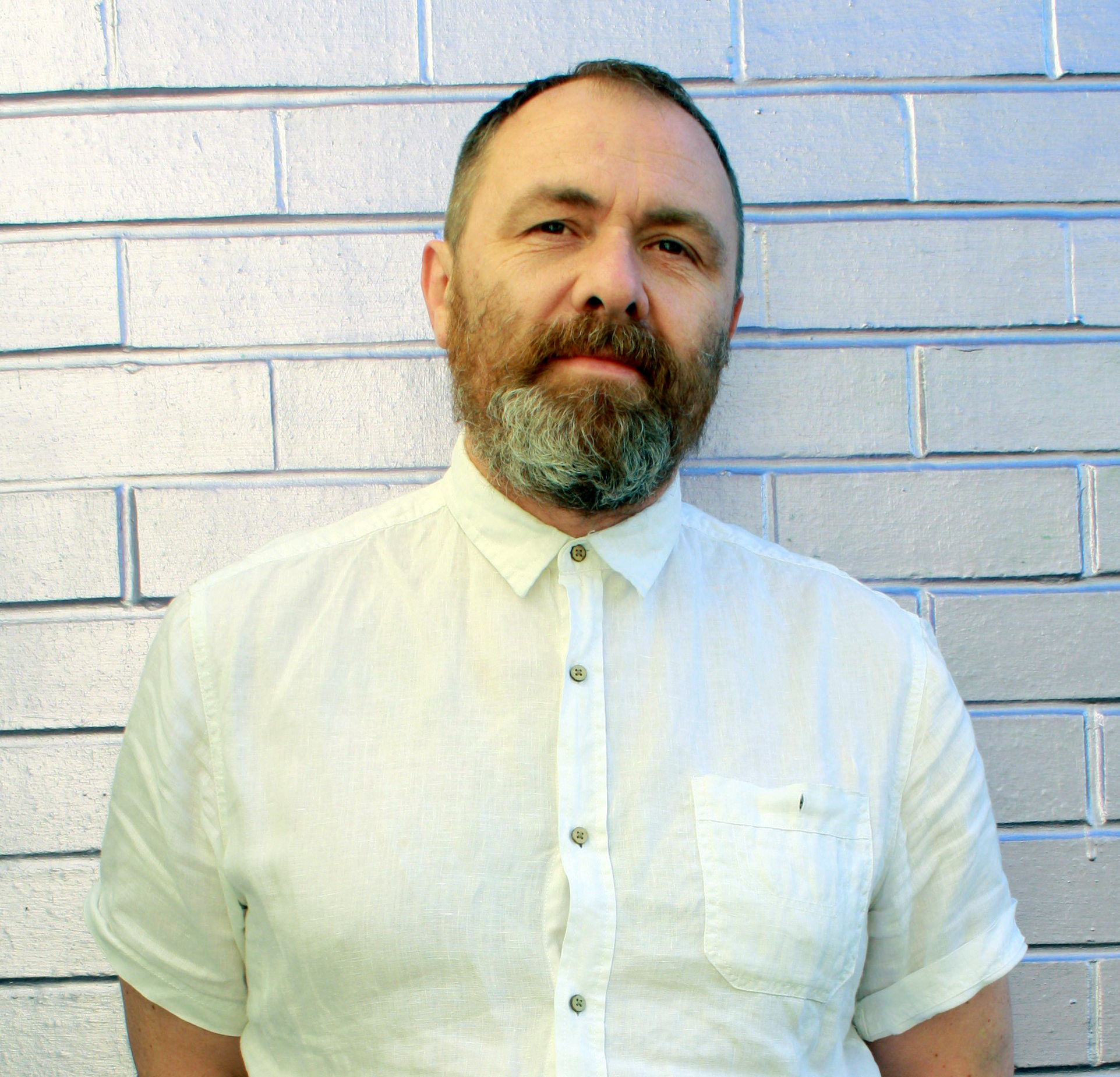
- English Musician

Background information
- Also known as: The Solid Doctor; J J Fuchs; Testosterone
- Origin: Kingston upon Hull, Yorkshire, England
- Genre: Electronic music
- Occupation: Music Producer
- Instruments: Guitar; keyboards, drums, programming
- Years active: 1986–present
- Labels: Steel Tiger Records, Twentythree Records, Déclassé

Steve Cobby is a British producer, musician, composer, and DJ based in Kingston upon Hull, Yorkshire. He is best known for being part of Fila Brazillia.

== Career ==
After disbanding his first band, Ashley & Jackson, on Big Life Records, he co-founded Fila Brazillia with David McSherry in 1990. Together, they released 10 critically acclaimed LPs and produced over 70 remixes for artists as diverse as Radiohead, Busta Rhymes, Black Uhuru, Simple Minds, James, A Certain Ratio, and Moloko.

He formed Pork Recordings with David Brennand in 1990, 23 Records in 1999 with Sim Lister and David McSherry, and Steel Tiger Records in 2006 with Lister. Steel Tiger Records being of an umbrella for his various projects than a label per se. His other writing and production collaborations include Heights of Abraham, J*S*T*A*R*S, and The Cutler.

He has released three solo albums, The Solid Doctor: How About Some Ether and Beats Means Highs. A third, entitled Saudade was released on his own imprint, Déclassé in March 2014.

Numerous remixes, from Harold Budd and Theoretics to Jon Kennedy and Yesking, have been undertaken in a solo capacity.

Fabric Nightclub has played host to many Cobby DJ sets. This was rewarded with an appearance on Fabric 18 alongside fellow Hull alumni Bobby Beige and Bliss.

He co-produced Afghan Whigs frontman Greg Dulli's debut solo album, The Twilight Singers, in 2000 and co-wrote and produced Three White Roses and a Budd EP with Bill Nelson and avant-garde American composer Harold Budd. Cobby has worked with Darren Emerson on his solo album in an engineering and writing capacity.

His collaboration with Cabaret Voltaire's Stephen Mallinder is under the guise of Hey Rube. Adam Regan from Different Drummer Records and Leftfoot Promotions in Birmingham is also a regular collaborator.

Cobby has DJ'd in many places around the world including Croatia, Sydney, San Francisco, New York, and Tokyo. He has performed live in Europe, Japan, and the United States.

== Work ==
=== Production ===
Production, co-production and remix projects include Radiohead; Afghan Whigs and The Twilight Singers.

=== Film and advertising ===
As Fila Brazillia (with David McSherry) his music has been used in films, including Riding Giants directed by Stacy Peralta – and adverts, including for Nokia. As J*S*T*A*R*S (with Sim Lister) his music has been used for adverts including for Fiat and the John Lewis Partnership.

In 2013, Cobby provided the soundtrack for the Hull 'UK City of Culture 2017' bid film – This City Belongs to Everyone, produced by Nova Studios. On 20 November that year, Kingston upon Hull, was announced as the winning.

=== Solo ===
Cobby releases mainly work under the pseudonyms The Solid Doctor and J J Fuchs. In March 2014, Cobby released his first solo album in 17 years entitled Saudade on his own imprint Déclassé. He went on to release Revolutions soundtrack (2015), Everliving (2015), Hemidemisemiquaver (2017), and Sweet Jesus (2019) under his name. Sweet Jesus was released digitally on May 17, without any marketing or promotion whatsoever, as a Bandcamp exclusive.

=== Collaborations ===
- with David Brennand a.k.a. Porky to form The Cutler; singles released during 2007 and 2008 included "Stiletto", "Pickaxe", and "Cinquedea". Debut album Cutler was released in July 2008 and the Black Flag EP in 2009. The second album release (September 2012) was The Best Things in Life Aren't Things with vocalists Andrew Taylor and Russell Morgan. The most recent release (10 June 2013) from The Cutler is their third album Everything Is Touching Everything Else, with vocalists Isobel Helen, Andrew Taylor, Archie and Sheffield's alt-folk outfit Little Glitches; all on Steel Tiger Records.
- with Stephen Mallinder, a co-founder of Cabaret Voltaire, to form Hey, Rube!; first album release Can You Hear me Mutha? (October 2012, Steel Tiger Records)
- with DJ Adam Regan, of the Different Drummer Soundsystem and Leftfoot, to form Chieftain; debut release The War Bonnet EP (2012, Steel Tiger Records)
- with Sim Lister to form J*S*T*A*R*S; released Put Me on a Planet on Steel Tiger Records in 2006.
- with Sim Lister and Jake Harries to form The Heights of Abraham; most recent release Two Thousand and Six on Twentythree Records in 2006.
- with classically trained guitarist Rich Arthurs of Orgatronics to form 'Peacecorps'; released Bushfarmer on Steel Tiger Records in 2007.
- with Richard H. Kirk to form Citrus.
- with Djinji Brown to form NorthEastSoundSystem.
- with David McSherry to form Fila Brazillia; most recent releases the album Retrospective on Twentythree Records in 2006 and Neanderthal in 2007, also on Twentythree Records.
