= Full House season 5 =

Full House
- Season 5
- DVD cover
- Starring: John Stamos; Bob Saget; Dave Coulier; Candace Cameron; Jodie Sweetin; Mary-Kate and Ashley Olsen; Lori Loughlin; Andrea Barber
- No. of episodes: 26

Release
- Original network: ABC
- Original release: September 17, 1991 – May 12, 1992

Season chronology
- ← Previous; Season 4 Next → Season 6

The fifth season of the sitcom Full House originally aired between September 17, 1991, and May 12, 1992, on ABC.

== Plot ==
In season five, Jesse and Rebecca become parents when Becky gives birth to twin boys, Nicky and Alex. Meanwhile, Jesse & The Rippers launch a new song which eventually becomes successful. Joey gets his own show The Legend of Ranger Joe which becomes a success. D. J. starts high school, and gets her own room while Stephanie and Michelle share a room. Stephanie starts fourth grade and Michelle starts kindergarten. Danny finds love.

== Main cast ==
- John Stamos as Jesse Katsopolis
- Bob Saget as Danny Tanner
- Dave Coulier as Joey Gladstone
- Candace Cameron as D. J. Tanner
- Jodie Sweetin as Stephanie Tanner
- Mary-Kate and Ashley Olsen as Michelle Tanner
- Lori Loughlin as Rebecca "Becky" Donaldson
- Andrea Barber as Kimmy Gibbler

== Episodes ==
No. overall	No. in season	Title	Directed by	Written by	Original release date	U.S. viewers (millions)
95	1	"Double Trouble"	Joel Zwick	Jeff Franklin	September 17, 1991	26.9
Jesse comes home from his band's summer concert tour to find out that Becky is having twins. Meanwhile, Michelle is scared and lost on her first day of kindergarten, so she goes to the other side of the school and pays Stephanie a visit.
96	2	"Matchmaker Michelle"	Joel Zwick	Ellen Guylas	September 24, 1991	27.7
Michelle badly wants a mother, but her choice turns out to be her kindergarten teacher (June Lockhart), who is twice Danny's age. Meanwhile, D.J. and Kimmy trade places for one night for a school project, much to the Tanners' dismay.
97	3	"Take My Sister Please"	Joel Zwick	Marc Warren & Dennis Rinsler	October 1, 1991	26.1
After Stephanie went too far in invading D.J.'s privacy, she no longer wants to share a bedroom with her, and thanks to an untimely insult, neither does Michelle, so Stephanie moves into the upstairs bathroom. Meanwhile, Danny and Joey fall for Becky's childbirth instructor, and Jesse gets fed up over Becky's food cravings during her pregnancy.
98	4	"Oh Where, Oh Where Has My Little Girl Gone?"	Joel Zwick	Mark Fink	October 8, 1991	25.4
Danny starts to feel that D.J. is excluding him from her social life, even after he granted her wish of her own bedroom last time, so he starts snooping and discovers a secret of hers. Meanwhile, since Michelle and Stephanie are now sharing a bedroom, Stephanie wants Michelle to take down all of her "baby stuff". Joey and Jesse get locked in the basement.
99	5	"The King and I"	Joel Zwick	David Pollock & Elias Davis	October 15, 1991	25.4
Jesse skips a family picnic to work on writing a song, but ends up regretting it. A man who looks a lot like Elvis Presley becomes Jesse's conscience, counseling him on the importance of family and advising him to go to the picnic.
100	6	"The Legend of Ranger Joe"	Joel Zwick	Boyd Hale	October 22, 1991	27.6
Joey has a streak of good luck. His childhood idol Ranger Roy (Barney Martin), the host of a children's program, is retiring, and Joey is confident to audition. However, his luck goes bad after innocently angering Roy by hugging him (due to acute physical paranoia), but when the show becomes a disaster, Joey uses his antics to save the day. Becky and D.J. are curious why Jesse wants good names for the twins, and Stephanie tries to get rid of Michelle's tap shoes. Note: Jesse's real name is revealed in this episode. His birth name was Hermes Katsopolis, but begged his mother to change it to Jesse after being teased in kindergarten. Also, this is the 100th episode of the series.
101	7	"The Volunteer"	Joel Zwick	Marc Warren & Dennis Rinsler	October 29, 1991	26.9
D.J. volunteers at a local nursing home, and befriends a man named Eddie (Whitman Mayo) with Alzheimer's disease. Meanwhile, Jesse tries to prove to Becky he can support a Lamaze pad; Stephanie and Kimmy argue over which of their family dogs is smarter, and decide to hold a neighborhood dog show in the back yard to decide.
102	8	"Gotta Dance"	Joel Zwick	Stacey Hur	November 5, 1991	27.3
Stephanie decides to pursue dancing full time. However, she does not realize that it is a major commitment that she may not be ready for. Rebecca has her baby shower, which Michelle accidentally spills the beans on after Jesse bribes her with an ice cream sundae.
103	9	"Happy Birthday, Babies"	Jeff Franklin	Jeff Franklin	November 12, 1991	35.7
104	10	"Happy Birthday, Babies"	Joel Zwick	Jeff Franklin	November 12, 1991	35.7
As Michelle is waiting for her fifth birthday party (with a Flintstones theme) to start, the entire family looks back at all the good times from Michelle's life. Michelle gets upset however when she realizes her baby book will end. Michelle's birthday party is interrupted by Becky going into labor, and Jesse having appendicitis. In the end, Becky gives birth to twin boys: Nicholas and Alexander. Although the gang tells Michelle that they are sorry her birthday got ruined, she tells them it didn't matter as Rebecca having Nicky and Alex on her birthday was the best one ever. Note: This is the first appearance of Nick and Alex. This was the last episode of the series to be written by series creator Jeff Franklin.
105	11	"Nicky and/or Alexander"	Joel Zwick	Ellen Guylas	November 19, 1991	30.0
Back home from the hospital, Jesse can't tell his identical twin sons, Nicky and Alex, apart, so he enlists Stephanie and D.J.'s detective kit to help him identify who's who. Meanwhile, Danny likes his new, temporary co-host, Vicky Larson (Gail Edwards). Elsewhere, Michelle is upset when D.J. and Stephanie get to hold the twins but she can't.
106	12	"Bachelor of the Month"	Joel Zwick	Tom Burkhard	November 26, 1991	27.9
Danny is chosen as "Bay Area Bachelor of the Month", much to the disapproval of Michelle - and Vicky. Jesse and Becky deal with the stresses of twins.
107	13	"Easy Rider"	Joel Zwick	Story by : Martie Cook; Teleplay by : Jeff Schimmel	December 3, 1991	30.6
Joey teaches Michelle how to ride a bike without training wheels, and is unsuccessful in their first attempt, but convinces her to try again. Meanwhile, Jesse and Becky prepare for the twins' first car trip to the over-kissing Aunt Ida. Danny begins to get intimate with Vicki.
108	14	"Sisters in Crime"	Joel Zwick	Boyd Hale	December 17, 1991	27.9
While babysitting her sisters, D.J. decides to take them to the movies with her when her crush (Scott Weinger) drops by unexpectedly. However, Stephanie and Michelle use all the money for snacks, leaving not enough money to pay for them. D.J. convinces Kimmy, who works at the theater, to sneak them in, but they are caught by the manager. Will Kimmy lose her job and Danny find out? Kimmy keeps her job and Danny found out and all three of them are punished. Note: This marks Scott Weinger's first appearance on the show as Steve before he becomes a regular in season 6. In this episode, his character's last name is Peters (later Hale).
109	15	"Play It Again, Jess"	Joel Zwick	Marc Warren & Dennis Rinsler	January 7, 1992	29.5
With Becky going back to work, Jesse becomes "Mr. Mom", while also trying to pursue a record deal. Meanwhile, Danny deals with Vicki leaving, and Stephanie accidentally stains D.J's sweater, which she had told her not to wear.
110	16	"Crushed"	Joel Zwick	Diana "Jennie" Ayers & Susan Sebastian	January 14, 1992	30.3
Stephanie's favorite singer, Tommy Page, sings a special song at her tenth birthday party. Afterwards, he signs her CD with the word "love." So Stephanie assumes he's in love with her, and then when D.J. kisses him, friction happens between the sisters. When the issue hits its boiling point, Danny must step in and get to the root of this issue.
111	17	"Spellbound"	Joel Zwick	Marc Warren & Dennis Rinsler	January 28, 1992	27.4
Stephanie is confident that she will win her school's spelling bee, only to get beaten by a rival classmate on the first word. She is very angry about this. In the subplot, Michelle wants to learn how to read.
112	18	"Too Much Monkey Business"	Joel Zwick	David Pollock	February 11, 1992	25.8
Danny's younger sister, Wendy (Darlene Vogel), stops by for a visit - with her pet monkey who likes Jesse and plays hide-and-seek with Joey. Meanwhile, Joey falls for Wendy and Danny is not very pleased, and Stephanie and Michelle get worried by a shipment for Wendy: a tiki head (which turns out to be nothing more than a bank).
113	19	"The Devil Made Me Do It"	Joel Zwick	Story by : Nicolas Wall & Jane Paris; Teleplay by : Elias Davis	February 18, 1992	28.6
Michelle's conscience gets the best of her after she mishandles Jesse's musical equipment. Angry at Jesse for being "Uncle Tattletale", she then runs away to her friend Teddy's house. Teddy's older sister is played by Tahj Mowry's real-life sisters Tia and Tamera Mowry. The subplot has D.J. trying to get Stephanie and Kimmy to become friends. Note: The Olsen twins are both in this episode; Ashley as the bad Michelle and Mary-Kate as the good Michelle.
114	20	"Driving Miss D.J."	Joel Zwick	Mark Fink	February 25, 1992	26.8
D.J. gets her learner's permit, only to tense up from driving lessons with "uptight" Danny and "laid back" Uncle Jesse. Meanwhile, Michelle tries to get revenge on Stephanie after she nearly scares her to death, and succeeds with a little help from Joey.
115	21	"Yours, Mine and Ours"	Bill Petty	Stacey Hur	March 3, 1992	29.0
Jesse and Rebecca imagine how each other's unique parenting techniques may affect the twins in the future. Meanwhile, Danny takes Joey and the girls out to "family fun night" after the girls fight about Stephanie getting irritated by D.J. hogging the bathroom she denies it because she was in there first since it's right across from her room and Stephanie turning off Michelle's Beauty and the Beast audio cassette after she played it for the 100th time despite trying to learn the words, maybe the whole script, which turns into Family Public Embarrassment Night (the family dressed up as pirates and walked the plank as the whole restaurant watched, including D.J.'s friends from school).
116	22	"Trouble with Danny"	Joel Zwick	Ellen Guylas & David Pollock	March 17, 1992	28.9
The family becomes irritated when Danny becomes too obsessed over "Spring Cleaning Day", especially with Michelle on board. Meanwhile, Jesse doesn't believe Becky when she says the twins are crawling. Note: On the North American DVD set, this episode incorrectly has the closing credits for the episode "Spellbound". This is especially noticeable because that episode's closing credits mention The Cat in the Hat, Theodor S. Geisel (Dr. Seuss) and Audrey S. Geisel.
117	23	"Five's a Crowd"	Joel Zwick	Ellen Guylas	March 31, 1992	27.3
D.J. goes out on a date with a heavy-metal band member to the drive-in. This causes Danny, Jesse, and Joey to go "rescue" her. Meanwhile, Kimmy babysitting leads to some feeding and changing disasters.
118	24	"Girls Will Be Boys"	Joel Zwick	Tom Burkhard & Stacey Hur	April 28, 1992	23.7
Michelle decides that it is better to be a boy after her best friend, Teddy, is hassled for hanging out with girls. Meanwhile, Jesse becomes Ranger Joe's sidekick Lumberjack Jess, and D.J. threatens to get back at Stephanie for her constant prying.
119	25	"Captain Video – Part 1"	Joel Zwick	Mark Fink & Boyd Hale	May 5, 1992	24.9
After being fired as Joey's sidekick, Jesse focuses on his music full-time, hoping to get a deal from Fat Fish Records. Although he is in a slump, Becky brings Mike Love and Bruce Johnston of the Beach Boys to help him. They sing "Forever", which Mike and Bruce lets Jesse cover for the record deal. D.J. tries to convince her dad to let her participate in a summer study program in Barcelona, Spain. Michelle tries to learn how to cook. Although Jesse gets the deal, he finds that they want to change up the style of the song.
120	26	"Captain Video – Part 2"	Joel Zwick	Marc Warren & Dennis Rinsler	May 12, 1992	21.4
The record company ends up completely ruining Jesse's song, much to Jesse's resentment, and he leaves the recording session, only to be inspired by Michelle. Meanwhile, Kimmy tries to get to go to Spain (for which she must pass her final exam and the course) with D.J. and Michelle tries to get an ant farm. Guest stars: Brian Robbins and Martha Quinn

== See also ==
- List of Full House episodes
