= Another Late Night: Fila Brazillia =

Compilation album by Fila Brazillia
- Released: 19 February 2001
- Genre: Electronica; Downtempo
- Length: 64:20
- Label: Azuli, Kinetic
- Producer: Fila Brazillia

Fila Brazillia chronology
Brazilification (Remixes 95-99) (1999)	Another Late Night: Fila Brazillia (2001)	Jump Leads (2002)

Another Late Night chronology
Fila Brazillia (2001)	Howie B (2001)

Professional ratings
Review scores
Source	Rating
Allmusic	4/5 stars

Another Late Night: Fila Brazillia is a DJ mix album, mixed by Fila Brazillia and is the first release in the Another Late Night / Late Night Tales DJ series. The album features songs that, as the band puts it, "represent some of the individuality and invention that has inspired us over the last twenty-odd years." With many of the albums in the series featuring a cover performed by the artist hosting, the band chose to cover "Nature Boy" by Nat King Cole, a song they heard a great amount during childhood. AllMusic praised the album, claiming it as "both an excellent introduction to the band's idiosyncrasies and a tacit triumph of naked eclecticism in its own right."

== Track listing ==
1. "The Persuaders! Theme" - John Barry
2. "Firefly" - Homelife
3. "Hero Theme" - The Infesticons
4. "Bucket Bottom" - Prince Alla
5. "Get a Move On!" - Mr. Scruff
6. ""T" Plays It Cool" - Marvin Gaye
7. "Regiment" - Brian Eno and David Byrne (from My Life in the Bush of Ghosts)
8. "It's Not Too Beautiful" - The Beta Band
9. "Rodney Yates" - David Holmes
10. "Nature Boy" - Fila Brazillia
11. "Nuclear Symphony" - Unforscene
12. "Les Nuits" - Nightmares on Wax
13. "Blue Sky" - Outside
14. "Suspended" - Kelis
15. "Prelude & Fugue In C Minor" - The Swingle Singers
