= Steel Tiger Records =

Record label from Yorkshire, England

- Founded: 2006
- Founder: Steve Cobby; Sim Lister
- Genre: electronica ambient techno nu jazz downtempo leftfield dub post rock
- Country of origin: UK
- Location: Yorkshire

Steel Tiger Records is a record label based in Yorkshire, England. The label was founded in late 2006 by Steve Cobby and Sim Lister.

Steve Cobby was formerly half of the iconic electronic music duo Fila Brazillia, in addition to his many other musical aliases, most notably The Solid Doctor – with The Heights of Abraham and Mandrillus Sphynx these are to be found on Twentythree Records.

Sim Lister was a member of Sheffield band Chakk and now, with Steve Cobby, is in The Heights of Abraham and J*S*T*A*R*S.

In 2013 Steve Cobby provided the soundtrack for the Hull 'UK City of Culture 2017' bid film – 'This City Belongs to Everyone', produced by Nova Studios – on 20 November 2013 Kingston upon Hull, East Riding of Yorkshire was announced as the winning City, and so as UK City of Culture 2017.

Steel Tiger Records catalogue features the following artists and releases:

- The Solid Doctor – A New Gladstone Bag – album – ST019, 16 December 2013
- Chieftain – Till Everyman Is Free – EP – ST018, 9 December 2013
- The Cutler – Everyone Is Remixing Everything Else – remix album – ST017, 30 September 2013
- Chieftain – Out of My Life – single – ST016, 5 August 2013
- The Cutler – Everything Is Touching Everything Else – album – ST015, 10 June 2013
- Hey, Rube! – Can You Hear Me Mutha? – album – ST013, 15 October 2012
- Chieftain – The War Bonnet EP – EP – ST014, 30 July 2012
- The Cutler – The Best Things in Life Aren't Things – album – ST012, 10 September 2012
- The Cutler – Black Flag – EP – ST011, 21 August 2009
- The Cutler – Cutler – album – ST010, 7 July 2008
- The Cutler – Cleaver – single – 2008
- The Cutler – Claymore – single – 2007
- The Cutler – Cinquedea – single – 2007
- The Cutler – Scimitar – single – 2007
- The Cutler – Pickaxe – single – 2007
- The Cutler – Epee – single – 2007
- The Cutler – Hacksaw – single – 2007
- The Cutler – Chandrahas – single – 2007
- The Cutler – Stiletto – single – 2007
- J J Fuchs – Stick It in the Middle – single – 2007
- Peacecorps – Bushfarmer – EP – 2007
- J*S*T*A*R*S – Put Me on a Planet – album – ST001CD, 18 September 2006

Steve Cobby and Stephen Mallinder record as Hey, Rube!.

Steve Cobby and Dave 'Porky' Brennand record as The Cutler.

Steve Cobby and DJ Adam Regan (Different Drummer, Leftfoot) record as Chieftain.

Steve Cobby and Sim Lister record as J*S*T*A*R*S.

Steve Cobby, Sim Lister and Jake Harries record as Heights of Abraham.

Steve Cobby and Rich Arthurs of Orgatronics record as Peacecorps.

Steve Cobby is J J Fuchs.

Steve Cobby is The Solid Doctor.

== See also ==
- List of record labels
- List of independent UK record labels
- List of electronic music record labels
- Fila Brazillia
- Pork Recordings
- Twentythree Records
- Cabaret Voltaire
