= Another Late Night: Howie B =

Compilation album by Howie B
- Released: 24 July 2001
- Genre: Electronica
- Label: Azuli, Kinetic
- Producer: Howie B

Howie B chronology
Folk (2001)	Another Late Night: Howie B (2001)	FabricLive.05 (2002)

Another Late Night chronology
Fila Brazillia (2001)	Howie B (2001)	Rae & Christian (2001)

Professional ratings
Review scores
Source	Rating
Allmusic	3/5 stars
NME	3.5/5 stars

Another Late Night: Howie B is a DJ mix album, mixed by Howie B. It was the second in the Another Late Night series and was released by Late Night Tales on 24 July 2001.

== Track listing ==
1. "What It Is?" – The Undisputed Truth
2. "Love's Theme" – Love Unlimited Orchestra
3. "Twilight" – Maze featuring Frankie Beverly
4. "I Changed My Mind" (Stereo MCs Rattlesnake Mix) – Lyrics Born and The Poets of Rhythm
5. "Uplink" – Stratus
6. "Mirage" – Santana
7. "Walking in Rhythm" – The Blackbyrds
8. "Summer Hot" – Curtis Mayfield
9. "Contrazoom" – Spacer featuring Alison Goldfrapp
10. "Respiration" – Black Star
11. "Work the Angles" – Dilated Peoples
12. "Heavy Tune" – Gong
13. "Under the Boardwalk" – Howie B
14. "Violet Don't Be Blue" – Herbie Mann
