= The Cutler =

English electronica collaboration

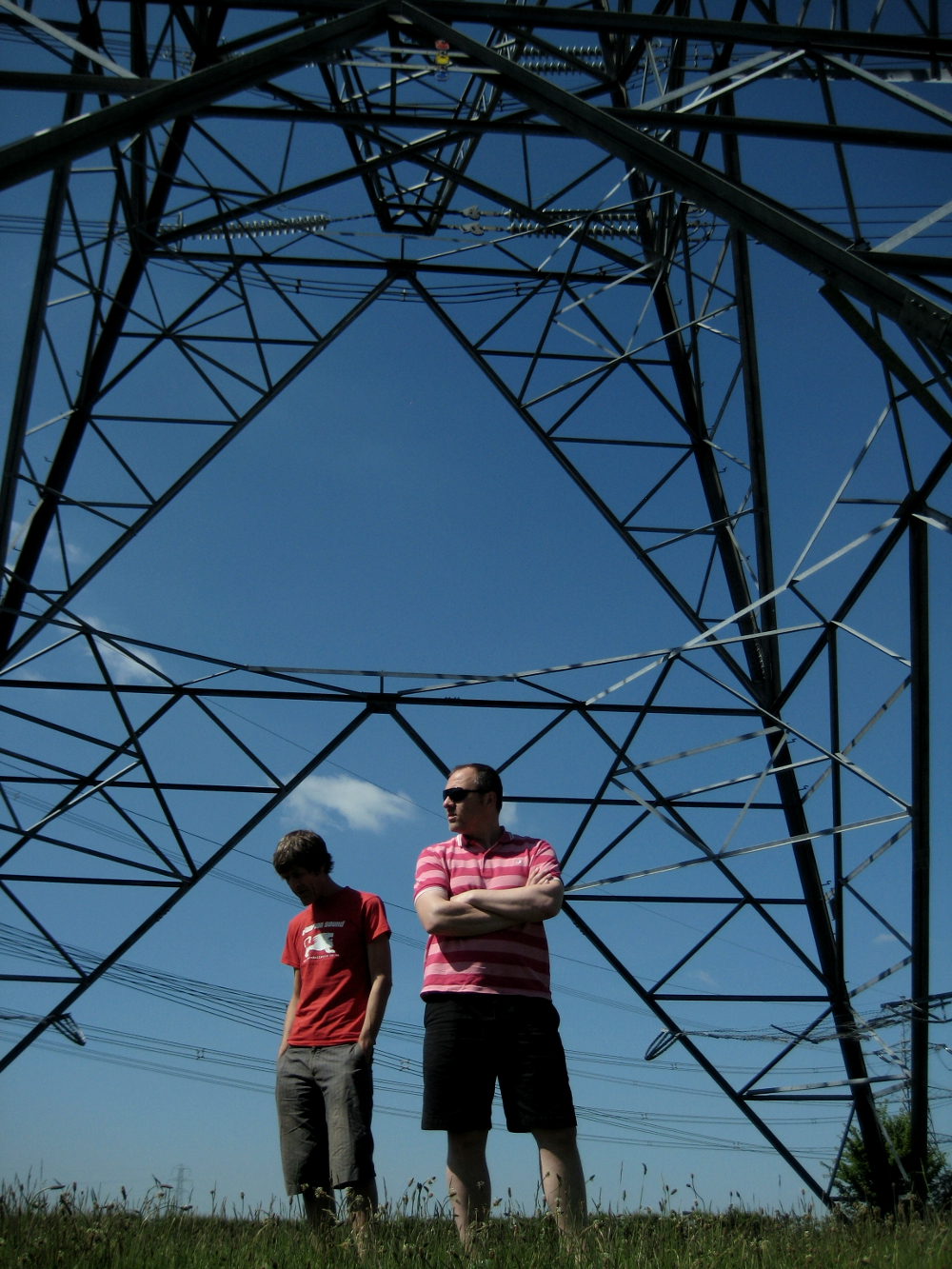
- The Cutler at Creyke Beck, 2013 (K Rudeforth)

Background information
- Origin: Kingston upon Hull, England
- Genres: Dub, post-rock, experimental, electronic
- Years active: 2006–present
- Labels: Steel Tiger Records
- Members: Steve Cobby; David 'Porky' Brennand

The Cutler is an electronica collaboration from Kingston upon Hull, Yorkshire. Formed by Steve Cobby, formerly half of Fila Brazillia, and David 'Porky' Brennand, founder of Pork Recordings, they play electronica and Dub music.

Formed in 2006, their debut release came in 2007 – on the electronica label Steel Tiger Records (based in Hull/Sheffield and established by Cobby with Sim Lister in 2006) – with the single, Stiletto.

On 11 June 2013, The Cutler were a front-page feature article on Bandcamp; the article's author is Andrew Jervis, the head curator at Bandcamp – he wrote, "The mojo is indeed back. Everything is Touching Everything Else is a varied album of songs and instrumentals loosely shepherded by Cobby and Porky, into a collection that is on par with the cream of the albums released on Pork Recordings. "Happenstance and spontaneity seem to guide us", explains Cobby. Romulus and Remus sounds like Peaking Lights or Wild Belle rope-dope'd by a dose of gritty bottom end. Quite Rightly unfolds at a more leisurely place with pretty harps and floaty Hammond organ, while Namaste is a proper dubby bass bin smasher. The vocal harmonies of Archie Heslewood and Little Glitches warm up proceedings on Roll Those Laughing Bones and OFGB respectively."

In the August 2012 edition of Echoes Mag, Dom Servini wrote, "Now, if Brazillia or Pork Recordings don't mean a lot to our younger readers then that's because their output has been pretty thin on the ground for the past few years, but trust these older ears when I tell you that these were two of the most important acts and labels of the electronic scene, lazily referred to as 'trip hop', that there was. Having The Cutler back on our radar is a real treat. Unashamed downtempo loveliness that's had people like Rob Da Bank getting very excited indeed."

Their early releases, including all tracks on the first album, were named after edged blades, knives and weapons. Their 2009 EP Black Flag takes an anti-capitalist theme, with tracks such as Burn the Bankers and 200 Pharaohs 6 Billion Slaves.

The track 'Quantum Entanglement' from The Cutler's album Everything Is Touching Everything Else was featured on Stuart Maconie's national radio show The Freakier Zone (BBC Radio 6 Music) on Sunday 2 June 2013.

== Discography ==
=== Albums ===
- Everyone Is Remixing Everything Else (Steel Tiger Records ST017, 30 September 2013) – with vocals by Isobel Helen, Archie Heslewood, Andrew Taylor and Little Glitches, remixers include Darren Emerson (Underworld), Robin Guthrie (Cocteau Twins) and Richard Dorfmeister (Kruder & Dorfmeister).
- Everything Is Touching Everything Else (Steel Tiger Records ST015, 10 June 2013) – with vocals by Isobel Helen, Archie Heslewood, Andrew Taylor and Little Glitches.

Remixes from Richard Dorfmeister (Kruder & Dorfmeister), Gavin Hardkiss (aka Hawke), Tranquility Bass, Mark Rae (Grand Central Music / Rae & Christian), Pete Lazonby, Mark Brydon (Moloko), Robin Guthrie (Cocteau Twins) and Darren Emerson (Underworld) will support this release as the collection Everyone Is Remixing Everything Else.

- The Best Things in Life Aren't Things (Steel Tiger Records ST012, 10 September 2012) – with vocalists Andrew Taylor and Russell Morgan
- Cutler (Steel Tiger Records ST010, 7 July 2008) – with vocalists Alex Crowfoot and Sarah Johns

=== EPs ===
- Black Flag EP (Steel Tiger Records, 2009) – with vocalists Andrew Taylor and Russell Morgan

=== Singles ===
- Claymore (Steel Tiger Records, 2007)
- Cinquedea (Steel Tiger Records, 2007)
- Scimitar (Steel Tiger Records, 2007)
- Hacksaw (Steel Tiger Records, 2007) – vocals by Alex Crowfoot
- Pickaxe (Steel Tiger Records, 2007)
- Épée (Steel Tiger Records, 2007) – vocals by Sarah Johns
- Chandrahas (Steel Tiger Records, 2007)
- Stiletto (Steel Tiger Records, 2007) – vocals by Sarah Johns

== Interviews ==
During October 2012 The Cutler were interviewed by Fari Bradley for Resonance FM – Resonance 104.4 FM is a London-based non-profit community radio station run by the London Musicians' Collective (LMC).

Studiotalk on whatpeoplesay.com – Steve Cobby was invited to provide a description of the production-process for some (P-A-Y-R, Revolution, and Black Sheep) of the tracks from The Best Things in Life Aren't Things to the 'whatpeoplesay' blog. "whatpeoplesay is a blog project centering around all kinds of actual electronic and alternative music... a playground to share thoughts and information about the music we love."

== Film projects ==
In 2013 Steve Cobby provided the soundtrack for the Hull 'UK City of Culture 2017' bid film – 'This City Belongs to Everyone', produced by Nova Studios – on 20 November 2013 Kingston upon Hull, East Riding of Yorkshire was announced as the winning City, and so as UK City of Culture 2017.

== See also ==
- Bands and musicians from Yorkshire and North East England
- List of independent UK record labels
- List of electronic music record labels
