= Full House season 1 =

Full House
- Season 1
- DVD cover
- Starring: John Stamos; Bob Saget; Dave Coulier; Candace Cameron; Jodie Sweetin
- No. of episodes: 22

Release
- Original network: ABC
- Original release: September 22, 1987 – May 6, 1988

Season chronology
- Next → Season 2

The first season of the sitcom Full House originally aired on ABC from September 22, 1987 to May 6, 1988.

== Premise ==
In the first season, after Danny Tanner's wife Pam dies, Jesse (Danny's brother-in-law), and Joey (Danny's best friend since childhood) move in to help him to raise his three daughters, D. J., Stephanie, and Michelle. D. J. starts fifth grade and Stephanie enters kindergarten.

== Main characters ==
- John Stamos as Jesse Cochran
- Bob Saget as Danny Tanner
- David Coulier as Joey Gladstone
- Candace Cameron as D. J. Tanner
- Jodie Sweetin as Stephanie Tanner

== Episodes ==
No. overall	No. in season	Title	Directed by	Written by	Original release date	Rating/share (households)
1	1	"Our Very First Show"	Joel Zwick	Jeff Franklin	September 22, 1987	21.7/34
After the death of his wife, Danny Tanner recruits his brother-in-law (Jesse) and his friend (Joey) to move in and help raise his three daughters, 10-year-old D.J., 5-year-old Stephanie, and 10-month-old Michelle. Jesse and Joey's first day as "dads" includes changing a diaper and dealing with D.J. wanting her own room instead of sharing one with Stephanie. Note: The unaired pilot was shot with John Posey as Danny Tanner because Bob Saget (the producers' first choice for the role) was unavailable. The pilot with Posey is included on the Complete First Season and Complete Series DVD sets.
2	2	"Our Very First Night"	Joel Zwick	Jeff Franklin	September 25, 1987	9.3/18
Jesse has to stay with the girls. They lie to Jesse, telling him that they are allowed to stay up late. Jesse has a band rehearsal, so he invites the band over.
3	3	"The First Day of School"	Richard Correll	Lenny Ripps	October 2, 1987	9.5/18
Stephanie is afraid of going to kindergarten, so Danny, Joey, and Jesse join her for her first day of school. D.J. is also unhappy about school when her best friend, Kimmy Gibbler, is placed in a separate classroom from her. Note: This is the first appearance of Kimmy Gibbler.
4	4	"Sea Cruise"	Tom Trbovich	Story by : Lenny Ripps; Teleplay by : Russell Marcus & Jeff Franklin	October 9, 1987	11.4/21
Danny's guys-only fishing trip with Jesse and Joey turns into a love-boat cruise, complete with a female captain, Caroline, and a all-girl rock band led by an old girlfriend of Jesse's, Roxanna. Danny becomes uncomfortable around Caroline as he feels he is becoming attracted to her at a time that he thinks is "too soon" after his wife's death. Note: On DVD and Streaming, "The Return of Grandma", "Sea Cruise", and "Daddy's Home" are listed in this order, but originally, the airing order for these three episodes was different.
5	5	"Daddy's Home"	Howard Storm	Joan Brooker & Nancy Eddo	October 16, 1987	10.0/18
Danny is waiting desperately for Michelle to say "Da-Da", but when she finally does, it is to Jesse and Joey. Fearing that his long work hours are negatively impacting his relationship with his children, Danny takes the girls on a string of father-daughter outings. Meanwhile, Jesse reluctantly agrees to give Joey lessons on how to be cool. The process turns out to be more strenuous than they expected, after Joey borrows Jesse's motorcycle and does not come back until the next day. Note: On DVD and Streaming, "The Return of Grandma", "Sea Cruise", and "Daddy's Home" are listed in this order, but originally, the airing order for these three episodes was different.
6	6	"The Return of Grandma"	Joel Zwick	Russell Marcus	October 30, 1987	11.4/21
When Grandma Tanner visits the Tanner house and sees how messy it is, she invites Joey's and Jesse's mothers to come over as well. The guys' mothers threaten to move in unless the house gets clean. Note: This is Alice Hirson's last appearance on the show as Claire Tanner; she is later replaced by Doris Roberts in the season three episode "Granny Tanny". Jesse's mother Irene was first played by Rhoda Gemignani before being replaced by Yvonne Wilder. Note: On DVD and Streaming, "The Return of Grandma", "Sea Cruise", and "Daddy's Home" are listed in this order, but originally, the airing order for these three episodes was different.
7	7	"Knock Yourself Out"	Joel Zwick	Jeff Franklin	November 6, 1987	10.9/19
Danny messes up his tryout as a boxing announcer when he reveals private information about a boxer (Ernie Hudson). Meanwhile, Joey and Jesse are KO'd by a bantamweight: Michelle.
8	8	"Jesse's Girl"	Jeff Franklin & Don Van Atta	Jeff Franklin	November 13, 1987	10.1/18
With a fierce thunderstorm keeping everybody awake at night, the kids are curious to know why Jesse looks ready to attack Joey with a baseball bat. So begins a flashback story from earlier that day, when Jesse's gorgeous guitar student ends up locking lips with Joey. Over the course of this crazy day, Joey ends up re-enacting The Wizard of Oz to entertain Stephanie, and baby Michelle becomes an unexpected mediator in Jesse and Joey's latest spat.
9	9	"The Miracle of Thanksgiving"	Peter Baldwin	Jeff Franklin & Russell Marcus	November 20, 1987	10.3/18
When his first Thanksgiving without his wife Pam arrives, Danny is determined to make the day extra special for his daughters. When Grandma is unable to make it, the men are inspired to make restaurant reservations, but D.J. and Stephanie encourage them to have the traditional festivities at home. The results involve a frozen turkey, a smashed pumpkin pie, and many tears, but the biggest challenge of all is with a certain family member who has not yet come to terms with Pam's death.
10	10	"Joey's Place"	Don Barnhart	Story by : Russell Marcus; Teleplay by : Jeff Franklin & Lenny Ripps	December 4, 1987	9.8/17
Joey has always been a good sport about living in a tiny alcove in the living room, but he needs to practice and he just cannot seem to find a place except the garage. D.J starts to notice how much Joey needs his own room. Then Joey gets to go on a comedy tour for two weeks, so the family thinks it's a perfect time to get Joey his own place. Since Joey is gone, Jesse has to take care of everything Joey had to. When Joey gets back he discovers that they made him his own room in the garage, which includes his old stuff from his mom's house.
11	11	"The Big Three-O"	Howard Storm	Gene Braunstein & Bob Perlow	December 11, 1987	9.5/17
As his 30th birthday approaches, Danny makes it clear to Jesse and Joey that he hates surprises and does not want a party, but as Jesse, Joey, and the kids plan an extravagant bash, the guys' decision to purchase some new seat Covers for Danny's beloved car ends up creating utter disaster and "Bullet" ends up in the San Francisco Bay. Jesse and Joey want to make up for it and buy him a new car that looks just like Bullet, but just as they are about to buy it, Joey and Jesse have to fight an unknown caller to get Danny's car.
12	12	"Our Very First Promo"	Richard Correll	Story by : Russell Marcus & Ron Morgrove; Teleplay by : Lenny Ripps & Arthur Silver	December 18, 1987	9.8/18
The station where Danny works is filming promos showing the members of their news team at home, which means a camera crew will be coming to the house. Everything seems to be in place when a woman named Ronnie Gardner shows up at the house for the filming, but Danny is perplexed when her methods of producing spicy television include dressing Jesse up as an English maid, having perfect French girls, replacing sweet baby Michelle with an unknown child and completely removing Joey from the picture, so Danny needs to tell Mrs. Gardner off and show the viewers the real Tanner family. As all this is going on, Jesse and Joey try hard to locate the source of some strange animal noises in the house, which turns out to be a ferret. Note: This episode chronologically comes before "Joey's Place". Belita Moreno guest stars as Ronnie.
13	13	"Sisterly Love"	Lee Shallat	Lenny Ripps	January 8, 1988	12.7/20
D.J. is starting to like acting after being in a play and auditions for a cereal commercial. At her audition, Stephanie comes along and plays with her cereal, and the people there in charge of the auditions notice her and like her – instantly calling her adorable – and give Stephanie the part, which leads to some sibling rivalry back at home when D.J. accuses Stephanie of stealing her part. Note: This is the first time Stephanie says, "How Rude!"
14	14	"Half a Love Story"	Howard Storm	Jeff Franklin & Russell Marcus	January 15, 1988	13.0/22
At the TV station, Jesse meets Danny's co-worker Robin Winslow (Kristian Alfonso), who is also an old friend of Danny's, and Jesse uses Michelle's cuteness to get a date with Robin. When Jesse comes home later that day, Robin is also there. Then Jill, another woman Jesse used Michelle's cuteness to get a date with, shows up. This is when things become complicated, because Robin is now reluctant to date Jesse. Robin is willing to bet that Jesse has never had a relationship with a woman last any more than three or four months, because Robin has dated Jesse's type before and ended up hurt by the quick break-up every time, and she doesn't want that to happen again. Jesse and Robin became friends.
15	15	"A Pox in Our House"	Joel Zwick	Lenny Ripps	January 29, 1988	10.9/19
When Stephanie catches the chicken pox, it quickly spreads to Jesse, who thought he already caught it as a child, and Joey, who previously spent his whole life believing that he is actually immune to chicken pox (despite later, in "Viva Las Joey", his father saying Joey got them at age 3). With an important sportscasting gig where he gets to interview the Golden State Warriors, and maybe play in the game, and a baby who shouldn't get chicken pox, he really needs a sitter. Just when Danny is going to give up, D.J. returns home from a slumber party she planned to attend and babysits the family.
16	16	"But Seriously Folks"	Joel Zwick	Russell Marcus	February 5, 1988	12.5/21
As D.J. works vigorously at her guitar lessons with Jesse, Joey eagerly preps for an upcoming gig at a local night club. The entire family comes out to support him, but with some talent scouts present, Joey faces public humiliation after Phyllis Diller takes over his slot, and hogs the show. As a result, Joey decides to put an end in his comedic career. In the wake of this revelation, he makes an overnight decision to put on a fancy suit, change his name to Joe, and become a serious businessman. Now that he is walking around with a briefcase and calling himself a comic failure, D.J., who has been struggling with her music lessons, follows Joey's lead and quits (only in her case, it's the guitar). Now that his behavior is impacting the kids he loves, will Joey be motivated to re-examine his recent choices?
17	17	"Danny's Very First Date"	Joel Zwick	Jeff Franklin	February 12, 1988	11.7/19
Danny develops an instant fondness for Linda, Stephanie's beautiful Honeybee troop leader. When she asks him on a date, the only things standing in his way are his two older daughters, who are not too happy about Danny's decision to date again. Willing to respect his children's feelings over romance, a very disappointed Danny calls the date off, but, after having a little chat with Jesse and Joey, the girls confront Danny directly with the truth about their confusion and anger. Meanwhile, Jesse and Joey are trying to put together an indoor playground in the living room for baby Michelle, which she ends up not liking.
18	18	"Just One of the Guys"	Lee Shallat	Lenny Ripps	March 4, 1988	14.2/24
When Danny's nephew Steve (Kirk Cameron, Candace's own brother) comes for a visit, D.J. is especially excited about hanging out with him again. Unfortunately, while D.J. absolutely idolizes her older cousin, she is disappointed to find that not only has he grown up a lot in recent years, but instead of ice skating with her like the good old days, he is more interested in doing the typical guy stuff with Danny, Jesse, and Joey. D.J. does not realize that Steve is becoming a young man and likes to do stuff that older guys do which makes D.J. feel jealous. D.J. discovers for the first time that it is never easy to feel left out. However, as the situation worsens, D.J. decides it is time to be one of the guys.
19	19	"The Seven-Month Itch - Part 1"	Lee Shallat	Jeff Franklin	March 11, 1988	12.4/21
The fact that Danny and Joey and the girls are going to Disneyland in Anaheim delights Jesse, who has been waiting to spend a romantic weekend alone with his girlfriend Samantha. But, when Danny, Joey, and the girls return home because the airplane could not take off in fog, it wrecks Jesse's plans. Jesse complains that he has zero privacy at home. This also affects Stephanie, who wanted to go to Disneyland. Jesse wants to leave, but Joey calms him down saying they need him. That night however, after Jesse has a nightmare, he decides to leave. The next morning, Danny and Joey discover a note on Jesse's empty bed stating that he has left to be on his own for a while, and does not know when (or if) he will be back. Note: This is the first episode where both Mary-Kate and Ashley Olsen appear in the same episode. They appear on-screen at the same time during Jesse's nightmare.
20	20	"The Seven-Month Itch - Part 2"	Russ Petranto	Story by : Rob Edwards & Russell Marcus; Teleplay by : Kim Weiskopf & Lenny Ripps	March 18, 1988	12.0/21
Waking up to find Jesse gone is a shock for everyone, but things get even messier as Danny and Joey try their best to hide the truth from the kids. After forcing Danny to admit that Jesse is considering moving out, D.J. passes the news along to her younger sisters and, since the adults claim that they cannot do anything about the situation, the girls join forces to get their uncle back home where he belongs. They call the cabin where Jesse is staying, and tell him that Michelle is coughing and he is the only one able to give her cough medicine. Although Jesse is a pretty tough guy, his little nieces are very familiar with his notorious weak spot.
21	21	"Mad Money"	Jeff Franklin	Rob Edwards	April 29, 1988	11.7/22
Joey's mother Mindy has found an old $5,000 savings bond in her safe deposit box, and the savings bond has Joey's name on it. When Joey receives the money, he starts spending it left and right. At the same time, Danny tries to collect an 11-year-old debt from Joey. The debt began on March 12, 1977, in Palm Springs – Joey's car broke down yet again, and Danny lent Joey his last $800 to get the car fixed – now that Joey has come into enough money, Danny asks Joey to give him the money, intending to give it back to him because he only wanted Joey to give it to him to show that he has grown up. However, Joey wants him to keep it, leading to a feud between Danny and Joey. Meanwhile, Jesse is working as an Elvis Presley impersonator in order to make some extra money for himself and his band, Jesse and the Rippers, to record a demo, but he does not want the family to know that he is working as an Elvis impersonator. They end up finding out and go to one of the shows. Jesse not only gives an awesome performance, he also takes home a Marilyn Monroe lookalike. Note: From this episode till the end of the season, John Stamos wears a mullet wig, due to cutting his hair.
22	22	"DJ Tanner's Day Off"	Joel Zwick	Kim Weiskopf & Michael S. Baser	May 6, 1988	10.3/20
When D.J. hears that her favorite singer, Stacey Q, will be at a local mall to give out autographs and, knowing that it would mean meeting her in person, she is willing to do anything, no matter what it takes, to make it happen. The problem is that the signings are scheduled to take place during school hours, so D.J. decides to secretly skip a day of school to get the autograph. D.J. gets Jesse to mention how he once secretly and successfully skipped a day from school, and D.J. pulls that same trick on Jesse and Joey. D.J. and Kimmy head to the mall and get in line to get an autograph, but they never expected Joey and Michelle to show up, because they did not know that Joey had made plans to get the autograph for D.J. and surprise her with it after school. Then, D.J. gets busted and Jesse and Joey must decide how to punish her and block Danny from learning of this so they could show Danny they are responsible substitute dads and following his instructions, only to have Stephanie blow their cover.

== Reception ==
The season received generally mixed-to-negative reviews from critics. On review aggregator Rotten Tomatoes, the season has an approval rating of 40% based on 5 critical reviews. On Metacritic, which uses a weighted average, the season holds a score of 31 out of 100, based on 7 critics, indicating "generally unfavorable" reviews. ABC almost cancelled the series after the season concluded.

== See also ==
- List of Full House episodes
