= Full House season 2 =

Full House
- Season 2
- DVD cover
- Starring: John Stamos; Bob Saget; Dave Coulier; Candace Cameron; Jodie Sweetin; Mary-Kate and Ashley Olsen
- No. of episodes: 22

Release
- Original network: ABC
- Original release: October 14, 1988 – May 5, 1989

Season chronology
- ← Previous; Season 1 Next → Season 3

The second season of the family sitcom Full House originally aired on ABC between October 14, 1988 and May 5, 1989. From this season onward, Mary-Kate and Ashley Olsen are credited in the opening credits.

== Plot ==
In season two, Danny is fired from his job as a sportscaster and instead is promoted to a higher position as the host of a morning talk show titled Wake Up San Francisco, earning him a co-host named Rebecca Donaldson (Lori Loughlin) and Jesse's potential love interest. Meanwhile, Jesse and Joey become best friends (much to Danny's jealousy) and start doing advertising jingles together. D. J. begins sixth grade and Stephanie enters first grade.

== Main cast ==
- John Stamos as Jesse Katsopolis
- Bob Saget as Danny Tanner
- Dave Coulier as Joey Gladstone
- Candace Cameron as D. J. Tanner
- Jodie Sweetin as Stephanie Tanner
- Mary-Kate and Ashley Olsen as Michelle Tanner

== Episodes ==
No. overall	No. in season	Title	Directed by	Written by	Original release date	U.S. viewers (millions)
23	1	"Cutting It Close"	Joel Zwick	Jeff Franklin	October 14, 1988	21.1
While Stephanie is playing a pretend game of "hairdresser" with Jesse, she unintentionally chops off a chunk of Jesse's hair, so Jesse has to go to Alejandro, his actual hairdresser, to repair the damage. On his way back home, Jesse fails to see a road sign that says "severe tire damage". As a result, Jesse accidentally wrecks the motorcycle, and is treated for two broken arms. Stephanie blames herself for this, and the way Jesse is acting in the wake of the accident only makes Stephanie feel worse.
24	2	"Tanner vs. Gibbler"	John Bowab	Lenny Ripps	October 21, 1988	22.3
It is Kimmy's 12th birthday, and D.J. has planned a surprise birthday party for Kimmy. When Stephanie slips up and mentions the party to Kimmy, Kimmy decides to bring her new friends Nina and Melissa, two older girls, to the party with her. Upon arriving, all Nina and Melissa want to do is invite a bunch of friends over to trash the house, so when D.J. kicks Nina and Melissa out, Kimmy abandons the party and goes to the mall with Nina and Melissa, and this starts a feud between D.J. and Kimmy. With help from Jesse and Joey, D.J. and Kimmy end their feud, as Kimmy realizes that D.J. doesn't want her to forget who her real friends are. Meanwhile, Danny is removed from his job as a sportscaster at the television station, because the station needs a new pair of co-hosts for their morning show Wake Up, San Francisco. Danny is named as one of the hosts while his co-host is Rebecca "Becky" Donaldson (Lori Loughlin), who moved to San Francisco from her hometown of Valentine, Nebraska.
25	3	"It's Not My Job"	Joel Zwick	Jeff Franklin	October 28, 1988	20.8
Jesse has made his first sale of an advertising jingle. As a result, Jesse tells his father, Nick Katsopolis, that he wants to leave the pest exterminator business that is run by Nick, and Nick is severely disappointed by this – so disappointed, that Nick loses his temper with Jesse and says that he is out of the family. Jesse and his mother Irene manage to talk some sense into Nick, who realizes that Jesse has a dream about making it in the music business, and Nick and Jesse work things out. Meanwhile, Stephanie is afraid to go to the dentist to get a tooth filled, and she is even more nervous when she is actually sitting in the examination chair. Joey helps her beat her fear.
26	4	"D.J.'s Very First Horse"	Lee Shallat	Bob Fraser & Rob Dames	November 4, 1988	22.4
As Danny and Becky shoot an episode of Wake Up, San Francisco at a local stable (complete with Danny milking an actual goat), D.J. bonds immediately with Rocket, a sweet and gentle horse who appears to be in need of a loving owner. Aware that her father would not accept this kind of family pet, D.J. joins forces with Kimmy to secretly earn the money and purchase Rocket. All is going well until Kimmy is unable to pay her share of the money at the last minute, and as D.J. buries herself deeper in the lies, she soon ends up in a heap of trouble with her father after Jesse and Joey's attempt to keep Danny from seeing the horse backfires.
27	5	"Jingle Hell"	Peter Baldwin	Marc Warren & Dennis Rinsler	November 11, 1988	21.7
When Jesse starts suffering from writer's block, Joey becomes an unlikely source for inspiration as Jesse prepares his latest commercial jingle. Upon realizing that he and Joey could work quite well together, Jesse convinces his buddy to become his partner in the advertising business, which works just fine until Joey alienates Jesse by making a foolish decision. Back at home, D.J. and Stephanie's sisterly squabbles create excess noise in the Tanner household, and Danny devotes his time to potty training Michelle.
28	6	"Beach Boy Bingo"	Steve Zuckerman	Marc Warren & Dennis Rinsler	November 18, 1988	25.0
Danny is elated when the Beach Boys are slated to appear on his talk show, and with a musical group as timeless as this one, it is not difficult for the entire Tanner household to get in the spirit. Everyone is disappointed to learn that the guys must cancel their guest visit due to the weather. But when D.J. participates in a radio telephone contest, she is suddenly the lucky winner of two Beach Boys concert tickets. Unfortunately, she can only take one person with her, so when she initially chooses Uncle Jesse, Danny makes it clear that his feelings are hurt. D.J. suddenly announces she had other plans and can't go, and tells Danny to go with Jesse. Regretting how manipulative he had acted, Danny accepts D.J's original decision, while Jesse tells D.J. to go with her father, but D.J. refuses to go, because the concert is not worth hurting anyone's feelings. So while they're arguing about who will go to the concert, Stephanie answers the phone and it turns out to be one of the Beach Boys, who is waiting at the front door with the rest of the band. They invite the entire family to appear onstage with them, which they happily accept.
29	7	"Joey Gets Tough"	Jeff Franklin	Lenny Ripps	November 25, 1988	23.2
While Danny and Jesse are out, Joey is left in charge of the girls. D.J. and Stephanie want to stay up late so they can watch a Tiffany concert on television. When Danny comes home and sees that they are up late watching the concert, Danny tells Joey that whenever Joey is at home alone with the girls, he needs to make them follow the rules of the house, so on the next day, D.J. arrives home from karate class an hour late without telling Joey that she was with friends, practicing for an upcoming karate tournament, and Joey grounds D.J. for the weekend when the tournament is scheduled to take place. D.J. becomes furious, angrily reminds Joey that he's not her father, and then storms off to the bedroom that she and Stephanie occupy. But the next day, she becomes even angrier when Danny and the rest of her family sides with Joey. Later, Joey explains that after her karate class during the hour when he didn't know where D.J. was, he was scared to death. D.J. is forced to agree that she should have called and told Joey that she was going to arrive home later than usual, and Joey agrees to let D.J. compete in the karate tournament, but she is still grounded the next weekend. Meanwhile, Jesse and The Rippers are scheduled to appear on Wake Up, San Francisco, where their appearance is messed up by Danny's boss, Mr. Strowbridge, who wants Danny to sing instead of Jesse.
30	8	"Triple Date"	Peter Baldwin	Jeff Franklin	December 9, 1988	24.0
Danny has a new girlfriend named Denise, and he invites Denise and her two friends Zoey and Cheryl for dinner so they both can get a nice meal. It turns out that Denise is a woman that Jesse once dated, that even named her dog after him, and this has Danny wondering if there could possibly be a woman in San Francisco that Jesse hasn't dated. Zoey doesn't like Joey's jokes, but Joey and Cheryl get along with each other just fine. Danny is depressed because Denise is still hung up on Jesse and she can't get her mind off of him because she thinks she and Jesse have an opportunity to get back together, until a talk with Jesse finally has Denise coming to her senses. Meanwhile, Stephanie causes D.J. to accidentally drop Danny's wedding ring down the drain in the sink. With a little work, Zoey and the guys help D.J. and Stephanie get the ring back, though their bathroom is flooded.
31	9	"Our Very First Christmas Show"	John Bowab	Kim Weiskopf	December 16, 1988	20.0
The family is on a flight to Colorado to spend Christmas with some relatives, and this is a trip that Danny has spent months planning – but on the way to Colorado, a blizzard forces an emergency landing at an unfamiliar airport. The family is forced to spend Christmas in the baggage claim room, where everyone thinks Christmas is ruined this time around. Among the things that happen here are: Jesse's father Nick tries to get Jesse to kiss Becky under a mistletoe, D.J. is upset that the gifts that the family brought along on the flight with them are missing, and Michelle is afraid of Lionel (Sorrell Booke), a man who made her cry on the airplane because of his toupee. Jesse, becoming ever so frustrated by everyone's sour attitudes, speaks to the people in the baggage claim room about the real meaning of Christmas. Then Santa Claus shows up and shows the family where the missing gifts are, and it turns out that Lionel is Santa Claus.
32	10	"Middle Age Crazy"	Peter Baldwin	Lawrence E. Hartstein & Richard H. Rossner	January 6, 1989	28.4
Stephanie knows it is not easy being the middle child. The way things are going, Stephanie thinks that D.J. and Michelle are getting all of the attention. Jesse and Joey are working on a jingle until they start helping D.J. with a science project, after they ignored Stephanie's request for them to watch her break a hula-hoop record. Danny is trying to videotape Michelle for Wake Up, San Francisco, ignoring Stephanie's request for him to watch her break the hula-hoop record that she wanted Jesse and Joey to watch her break. Stephanie has had enough, and she believes that the only way she'll get out of this situation is if she is not living at home anymore, so she decides that she wants to marry her friend Harry. Then the guys come to their senses and realize how bad they've made Stephanie feel.
33	11	"A Little Romance"	John Bowab	Bob Fraser & Rob Dames	January 13, 1989	28.0
After working hard to organize a charity benefit, Becky has only one thing left to do-find a few eligible bachelors who will agree to be auctioned off as dates for the event. Luckily, there are three men right in the Tanner house who just might be persuaded to participate! The evening is a success and even manages to run relatively smoothly – that is, until Jesse's extreme popularity with the ladies prompts a surprising reaction from Becky. Meanwhile, for a 6th-grade girl, there is perhaps nothing more exciting than having a boyfriend for the first time, but when D.J. earns the affections of handsome classmate Michael Montfort, she may also be headed for the inevitable pain of heartbreak. Guest Star: Jonathan Brandis as Michael Montfort
34	12	"Fogged In"	Joel Zwick	Kim Weiskopf	January 20, 1989	25.8
Jesse and Joey have been up all night working on their latest jingle, which is for "Casa De Pancakes". When D.J. and Kimmy unknowingly erase the jingle from the tape it was recorded on by recording their version of "The Loco-Motion" on what they thought was a blank tape, Jesse loses his temper and yells at D.J. and Kimmy. Upon realizing his mistake, Jesse buys D.J. a drum set as an apology. Later, Jesse's father Nick shows up and tells Jesse that he and Jesse's mother Irene have been arguing, and Irene told Nick to go stay with Jesse for the time being, but the thick fog outside has forced Irene to stay at the Tanner house as well. The fog is also preventing a disappointed Joey and his girlfriend Cheryl from going on a skiing trip. Later, Jesse helps Nick and Irene patch things up, and this makes Jesse realize that he should have talked to D.J. about yelling at her and Kimmy for erasing the tape instead of trying to buy her forgiveness by buying the drum set for her. Danny allows D.J. to keep the drum set, but tells her "the sticks have got to go!".
35	13	"Working Mothers"	Peter Baldwin	Jeff Franklin	February 3, 1989	26.6
It was obvious from the beginning that Jesse and Joey had a special knack as advertising partners, but they are forced to work extra hard when their boss demands a sharp, intelligent commercial idea that, if they are successful, could land them full-time jobs. Danny takes on more responsibility with the kids as Jesse and Joey devote increasing amounts of time to this important task, and when their boss approaches them once again with an exciting offer, there's more at stake than they originally anticipated.
36	14	"Little Shop of Sweaters"	Peter Baldwin	Lenny Ripps	February 10, 1989	24.6
When the three Tanner girls receive Valentine's Day presents from the guys, nobody is more excited than D.J., who receives a beautiful new sweater. When a little mishap at school tears it to shreds, D.J. races to the mall with Stephanie and Kimmy for a quick replacement, only to discover that her savings do not quite match the item's expensive price. Desperate to help her sister, Stephanie takes the "Buy Now, Pay Later" concept a bit too literally and walks right out of the store with the unpaid sweater. Fearful about the prospect of going to jail, D.J. and Stephanie come out with the truth, while Jesse plans to get serious with Becky.
37	15	"Pal Joey"	John Bowab	Marc Warren & Dennis Rinsler	February 17, 1989	26.1
A little over a year and a half ago, when Jesse and Joey moved into the house, Jesse and Joey did not exactly get along with each other very well at the beginning, but since then, they have become good friends. However, it's making Danny feel left out because lately, Joey has been taking Danny for granted. When Danny confronts Joey, they remember the day they became friends back in the 5th grade on February 23, 1968, when they protected each other from a bully named Sheldon. When Danny and Joey head to the school where this happened 21 years ago, they unearth the pledge they signed, which was a pledge to always be friends. Joey apologizes for taking their friendship for granted, and then he and Danny call Jesse to the school so Jesse can add his name to the pledge. Meanwhile, Stephanie's friend Harry has a crush on D.J., leading Stephanie to accuse D.J. of stealing her friend.
38	16	"Baby Love"	Peter Baldwin	Jeff Franklin	February 24, 1989	29.0
Rebecca's family is visiting from Valentine, Nebraska. Michelle falls for Howie, her nephew, but she is heartbroken and refuses to sleep when it is time for Howie to go home. Jesse helps to cheer her up. Meanwhile, Stephanie has a hard night after watching The Wolf Man with D.J. and Kimmy.
39	17	"El Problema Grande de D.J."	Bill Foster	Bob Fraser & Rob Dames	March 10, 1989	23.1
D.J.'s report card is filled with A's, but a shocking D in Spanish is enough to send Danny to her foreign language instructor for a little conference. Pressed on by D.J. to get the grade changed, Danny finds himself in a difficult situation when Senorita Mosley apparently has the hots for him. Then when they are at D.J.'s house tutoring D.J., they start kissing the exact time D.J.'s whole class come in through the kitchen door. An embarrassed D.J. storms up to her room in anger and frustration. Meanwhile, when Jesse and Joey's boss needs an adorable toddler to shoot a marshmallow commercial, they know the perfect kid to fit the bill: little sweet Michelle. Jesse and Joey are ecstatic when they hear that Michelle will be able to do the commercial. But when Jesse overfeeds her with marshmallows as practice, she no longer wants to eat marshmallows when it comes time for the commercial.
40	18	"Goodbye, Mr. Bear"	Jack Shea	Kim Weiskopf & Jeff Franklin	March 24, 1989	24.4
It is annual spring cleaning time, which has become one of Danny's favorite times of the year. During the course of things, Jesse learns what "little cause, big effect" means when he accidentally breaks a drawer handle in the kitchen, and ends up having to renovate the kitchen's entire network of cabinets and drawers because the broken handle's design has been discontinued. So he buys all new ones. But then the screws are too big and he has to drill bigger holes for them to fit. Unfortunately, it cracks the drawers and he gets a new design that doesn't go very well with the cabinet design that is in the kitchen, so Jesse buys cabinets that match. Meanwhile, Stephanie is frantic. It seems that Mr. Bear, the stuffed toy that the girls' mother, Pam Tanner, gave Stephanie on the day Pam brought newborn Michelle home from the hospital, is missing. Subconsciously, Stephanie does not want to lose Mr. Bear because it was a gift from Pam, and it reminds Stephanie of her. The family helps Stephanie look for Mr. Bear, but to no avail. Stephanie then suspects that Joey may have unintentionally given Mr. Bear away, but it turns out that Michelle has known where Mr. Bear is all along, because Michelle had hidden Mr. Bear. While the family is remembering Pam by watching home movies of Pam arriving home from the hospital with baby Michelle two years ago, Michelle gives Mr. Bear back to Stephanie.
41	19	"Blast from the Past"	Tom Rickard	Lenny Ripps	April 7, 1989	21.5
In college, Joey had a girlfriend named Patty Fogerty, who ended up leaving him for a guy named Michael Winchester. This left Joey devastated, because he wanted to marry Patty and spend the rest of his life with her. Now, years later, Patty tracks down Joey's bedroom phone number and calls him. Joey invites Patty over to the house, and Danny does not like this one bit, because he does not want to see Joey once again get hurt by Patty, who explains that she left Joey for Michael Winchester because she wanted more romance in her life and while she thought Joey was funny, she did not think Joey was serious about settling down and having a real relationship. Realizing things have changed, Joey and Patty decide to start their relationship over completely clean. Meanwhile, Kimmy uses Stephanie and D.J. as guinea pigs for a magic trick involving a pair of magician's handcuffs that belong to Kimmy's brother Garth, who is in Las Vegas. Kimmy does the trick and D.J. and Stephanie are now cuffed to each other, and Kimmy realizes she does not know how to do the trick that is needed to remove them. An even bigger problem is that Garth has the key that unlocks the cuffs. But in the end, it turns out that Jesse knows how to unlock the cuffs because he had some when he was a kid.
42	20	"I'm There for You, Babe"	Jack Shea	Kim Weiskopf	April 14, 1989	23.6
It is Jesse's 26th birthday, and it seems that everyone is trying to pull him in every direction at the same time. He is scheduled to coach D.J. and Kimmy's soccer team in a game at 3:30 p.m., he and Joey are doing a jingle for a credit dentist commercial, Danny schedules Jesse to perform at the Smash Club in front of music critic Sam Battersby, Stephanie needs Jesse to bake 100 of his special cookies for a school bake sale, and Michelle needs Jesse to fix her jack-in-the-box toy. Jesse coaches the soccer team to a win, then Rebecca shows up at the house and asks Jesse to go with her to the wedding of her aunt's former son-in-law tomorrow, then Danny asks Jesse to fix his car. Jesse thinks he can handle it all, until he and the family go to the Smash Club and Jesse discovers that the Rippers are at another club because they ended up booked for two gigs on the same night. So Jesse is forced to use the family as his makeshift band mates because he has always wanted to perform in front of Sam Battersby. Jesse realizes that all of the things he has obligated himself to on this day are too much, and the family agrees, deciding to give Jesse a much needed break from it all.
43	21	"Luck Be a Lady – Part 1"	Bill Foster	Story by : Bob Fraser & Rob Dames; Teleplay by : Marc Warren & Dennis Rinsler	April 28, 1989	23.3
The family goes to Lake Tahoe, and stay at the fabulous Ali Baba Hotel and Casino, where Danny and Becky will be doing a special episode of Wake Up, San Francisco. Joey gets lucky on a slot machine winning $100,000, but does not get the money because a videotape shows D.J. pulling the machine's lever then ducking back to the other side of a red velvet rope dividing the slot machine's from the table where Stephanie and D.J. were while an unsuspecting Joey's back is turned. Joey did not know it was D.J. or Stephanie who pulled the lever, so of course he is surprised. Jesse is jealous because Becky can't get her mind off of movie star Todd Masters (Steve Bond), who is scheduled to be a guest on the special episode of Wake Up, San Francisco. Jesse makes it his mission to make Becky just as jealous so that Becky will know how she is making Jesse feel, and then they have an argument in their hotel room. When they calm down, Jesse asks Becky to marry him, and Becky accepts the proposal.
44	22	"Luck Be a Lady – Part 2”	Bill Foster	Story by : Bob Fraser & Rob Dames; Teleplay by : Lawrence E. Hartstein & Richard H. Rossner	May 5, 1989	23.8
Jesse and Becky want to get married as soon as possible – in one hour, without telling anyone until the wedding is over, but what they do not know is that D.J. and Stephanie have decided to play detective and investigate Jesse and Rebecca. With a little work, D.J. and Stephanie discover Becky and Jesse's plans to get married, and they tell Danny and Joey about it. Danny and Joey try to talk Jesse out of going through with the wedding so suddenly, but Jesse won't listen. During the ceremony, before they can be pronounced husband and wife, Becky gets cold feet and leaves Jesse at the altar, devastating Jesse. Later, after Jesse tells Becky how much she hurt him by leaving him at the altar, Becky apologizes and explains that there are a lot of things to think about and talk about before they can plan a wedding.

== See also ==
- List of Full House episodes
