= J*S*T*A*R*S =

Electronic Music Collaboration

- Origin: Sheffield and Kingston upon Hull, England
- Genres: Electrofunk, electronic
- Years active: 2002–present
- Labels: Steel Tiger Records
- Members: Steve Cobby; Sim Lister

J*S*T*A*R*S is an electronic musical collaboration formed by Steve Cobby and Sim Lister in 2002, from Kingston upon Hull and Sheffield in Yorkshire.

Their debut release was a 12" vinyl, "Tripping the Light Fantastic" / "Ickey Plush" on the electronica label, Twentythree Records, which was also based in both Hull and Sheffield. Their first album, Put Me on a Planet (Steel Tiger Records) was named "one of the surprise hits of 2006" by Matt Anniss in the December 2006 issue of International DJ Magazine.

Cobby and Lister were founders of both Steel Tiger Records and Twentythree Records. J*S*T*A*R*S's track "Loose Nuke Threat" from Put Me on a Planet featured in television/cinema advertisements for the John Lewis Partnership spring campaigns for 2004 and 2005.

"Loose Nuke Threat" also featured in the 2012 Fiat Panda TV advertising campaign. Eagle-i Music set up this synchronisation.

== Discography ==
=== Albums ===
- Put Me on a Planet (Steel Tiger Records, 2007)

=== Singles ===
- "Spansules" (Twentythree Records, 2003)
- "Ooilovemababy" / "Positronic Absorber" (Twentythree Records, 2003)
- "Tripping the Light Fantastic" / "Ickey Plush" (Twentythree Records, 2002)

== See also ==
- List of independent UK record labels
- List of electronic music record labels
- Bands and musicians from Yorkshire and North East England
