= Fila Brazillia =

English electronica duo from Yorkshire

- Also known as: 2 Loops Lautrec
- Origin: Hull, England
- Genres: Electronic, trip hop, ambient, house, downtempo
- Years active: 1990–2006 • 2020–present
- Labels: Pork Recordings; Mindfood; Mr Bongo; Twentythree; Kudos; Kinetic Records; Azuli Records
- Members: Steve Cobby; David McSherry
- Website: filabrazillia.net

Fila Brazillia is an English electronica duo from Kingston upon Hull, Yorkshire, England, formed in 1990 by Steve Cobby and David McSherry.

== History ==
Their early albums were released on Pork Recordings, also based in Hull: Old Codes New Chaos, Maim That Tune, Mess, Black Market Gardening, Luck Be a Weirdo Tonight and Power Clown. After creating their own music label with Sim Lister, Twentythree Records, they released further albums A Touch of Cloth, Jump Leads, The Life And Times of Phoebus Brumal, Dicks and Retrospective. They have also released two DJ mix albums, Another Late Night: Fila Brazillia, for Azuli Records' "Another Late Night" series, and Another Fine Mess: Fila Brazillia, and two collections of remixes: Brazilification and B2.

Their collaborations include working with Harold Budd and Bill Nelson to release Three White Roses & A Budd (Twentythree Records, 2002). They co-produced the first Twilight Singers LP Twilight as Played by The Twilight Singers with Greg Dulli in 2001. Cobby and McSherry have produced more than 70 remixes for artists including Black Uhuru, Busta Rhymes, DJ Food, Lamb, Radiohead and The Orb. Bill Hicks, the controversial American stand-up comedian, satirist and social critic, "appears" on Fila Brazillia's album Maim That Tune (1996) and the album is dedicated to Hicks.

Their music has made its mark both on small-screen blockbusters (such as CSI and Sex and the City) and cult cinema films such as Dogtown and Z-Boys, Riding Giants and Once in a Lifetime: The Extraordinary Story of the New York Cosmos, a 2006 documentary about the New York Cosmos soccer team. One of their better-known songs, A Zed and two L's, appears on Jam, a black comedy sketch show by British satirist Chris Morris. Their song "Here Comes Pissy Willy" from the Power Clown album featured as the theme to the James Whale Show on Talk Radio UK in the late 1990s.

After releasing their Retrospective album in 2006, Cobby and McSherry quietly ended their longtime partnership. Currently, McSherry is a lecturer in Sound and Music Production at the University of Lincoln.

Cobby went on in late 2006 to form Steel Tiger Records with Sim Lister. Over the course of 2007, the label saw various digital releases by J*S*T*A*R*S (Cobby and Lister), Peacecorps (Cobby and guitarist Rich Arthurs) and by The Cutler (Cobby and ex-head of Pork Recordings David "Porky" Brennand). The first formal album by The Cutler on Steel Tiger Records was released on 7 July 2008, and the most recent "Everything Is Touching Everything Else" (Steel Tiger Records ST016, 10 June 2013) – with vocals by Isobel Helen, Archie Heselwood, Andrew Taylor and Little Glitches – distributed by Kudos Records Ltd.

In 2013 Steve Cobby provided the soundtrack for the Hull 'UK City of Culture 2017' bid film - 'This City Belongs to Everyone', produced by Nova Studios - on 20 November 2013 Kingston upon Hull, East Riding of Yorkshire, was announced as the winning City, and so as UK City of Culture 2017.

After a 16 year hiatus, on 6 March 2020, the band returned with the release of the MMXX EP.

In 2023, they appear to have released the Subtle Body album/EP, with two original tracks and two unreleased versions.

== Discography ==
=== Albums ===
- Old Codes New Chaos (1994)
- Maim That Tune (1995)
- Mess (1996)
- Black Market Gardening (1996)
- Luck Be a Weirdo Tonight (1997)
- Power Clown (1998)
- A Touch of Cloth (1999)
- Jump Leads (2002)
- The Life and Times of Phoebus Brumal (2004)
- Dicks (2004)
- Subtle Body (International Feel, 2023)

=== Singles ===
- Mermaids (Pork Recordings, 1991)
- Rankine (Pork Recordings, 1992)
- Fila Funk/Rankine (Live At Bounce) (Pork Recordings, 1993)
- Pots & Pans/The Sheriff (Pork Recordings, 1993)
- Slacker (Pork Recordings, 1994)
- A Zed & Two L’s/Harmonicas Are Shite (Pork Recordings, 1995)
- Soft Music Under Stars/Blood (Pork Recordings, 1996)
- Wigs, Bifocals And Nurishment (Pork Recordings, 1997)
- The Speewah/Feathery Legs (Pork Recordings, 1998)
- Bovine Funk/Here Comes Pissy Willy (Pork Recordings, 1998)
- Throwing Down A Shape (Pork Recordings, 1998)
- FB@V&A (Pork Recordings, 2001)
- Fila Brazillia Versus A Certain Ratio (Pork Recordings, 2003)
- Fila Brazillia Remix Beef Wellington & DJ Razor (Pork Recordings, 2003)
- The Goggle Box (Pork Recordings, 2004)
- Neanderthal (Twentythree Records, 2007)
- One Track Mind (Twentythree Records, 2007)

=== EPs ===
- Sycot Motion (Mindfood, 1996)
- Ridden Pony (Pork Recordings, 1999)
- Bitten Bugs (Pork Recordings, 1999)
- Spill The Beans (Pork Recordings, 2001)
- Three White Roses & A Budd (with Harold Budd and Bill Nelson) (Twentythree Records, 2002 – recorded 2000)
- Saucy Joints (Twentythree Records, 2002)
- We Build Arks (Twentythree Records, 2002)
- One Track Mind (Twentythree Records, 2007)
- MMXX (Twentythree Records, 2020)

=== Compilations ===
- Music for Freelance (1999)
- Retrospective (Twentythree Records, 2006)

=== Remixes ===
- Brazilification (Remixes 95–99) (Kudos, 1999)
- 21 Brazilliant Remixes (B2) (Twentythree Records, 2003)
- Soul Sauce on Verve Remixed 2 (Verve Music Group, 2003)

=== DJ mix albums ===
- Another Late Night: Fila Brazillia (2001)
- Another Fine Mess: Fila Brazillia (2004)
