= Pork Recordings =

English electronica record label

- Founded: 1992
- Founder: David "Porky" Brennand
- Genre: Electronica, downtempo, ambient, post rock, gutterfunk, dub and minimal
- Country of origin: UK
- Location: Yorkshire

Pork Recordings is a record label based in Kingston upon Hull, East Yorkshire, England, that specialises in electronica, mostly in the downtempo or chill-out styles.

Formed in the early 1990s by David "Porky" Brennand and Steve Cobby, its most significant artists included Fila Brazillia, Baby Mammoth, Bullitnuts and most recently Leggo Beast.

Brennand also records with Steel Tiger Records as The Cutler; a collaboration with Steve Cobby.

== See also ==
- Lists of record labels
- List of electronic music record labels
