= Brennan (surname) =

- Pronunciation: /ˈbrɛnən/
- Language: English

Origin
- Language: Irish
- Derivation: Ó Braonáin; Ó Branáin or Mac Branáin
- Meaning: 'moisture', 'drop'; 'little raven'
- Region of origin: Ireland

Brennan (/ˈbrɛnən/) is an Irish surname which is an anglicised form of two different Irish-language surnames: Ó Braonáin and Ó Branáin (or Mac Branáin). Historically, one source of the surname was the prominent clan Ua Braonáin (O'Brennan) of Uí Duach (Idough) in Osraige who were a junior Dál Birn sept stemming from a younger son of Cerball mac Dúnlainge (d. 888). Recent surname evaluations highlighted the geographic consistency of this lineage in the barony of Idough. However, based on the ultimate authority of Dubhaltach Mac Fhirbhisigh they are out of Ui Dhuinn (O’Dunn), and, therefore, an Uí Failghi tribe, not Osraige. While it is clearly apparent John O’Hart's given pedigree is erroneous, it is suggested Ó Cléirigh probably became confused while transcribing from Mac Fhirbhisigh. This view is echoed by modern scholar Bart Jaski.

The Irish surname Ó Braonáin, means "descendant of Braonán". The personal name Braonán is derived from a word which means "moisture", "drop". The Irish surname Ó Branáin, means "descendant of Branán". The personal name Branán means "little raven". Brennan is also a given name.

Notable people with the surname include:

== A ==
- Aaron Brennan, fictional character from the Australian soap opera Neighbours
- Ad Brennan (1887–1962), pitcher in Major League Baseball
- Alastair Brennan (born 1945), British ice hockey player
- Allison Brennan (born 1969), American writer of romantic thriller novels
- Amanda Brennan, content and community associate at Tumblr
- Andrew Brennan, various people
- Angela Brennan (painter) (born 1960), Australian painter.
- Anna Teresa Brennan (1879–1962), Australian lawyer
- Anne M. Brennan, acting United States General Counsel of the Navy (2009–2010, 2017–present)
- Archie Brennan (born 2000), English footballer
- Archie Brennan (weaver) (1931–2019), Scottish tapestry maker
- Arthur Brennan (1881–1931), Australian rules footballer
- Ashleigh Brennan (born 1991), Australian gymnast

== B ==
- Barbara Brennan (1939–2022), American author and spiritual healer
- Barry Brennan (Galway footballer) (born 1956), Irish Gaelic footballer from County Galway
- Barry Brennan (born 1975), Irish Gaelic footballer from County Laois
- Bernie Brennan (born 1927), Canadian Football League player
- Beth Brennan (also Willis), fictional character from the Australian soap opera Neighbours
- Biko Bradnock-Brennan (born 1992), Irish-English footballer
- Binnie Brennan (born 1961), Canadian writer and musician
- Bishop Len Brennan, fictional character from Irish sitcom Father Ted
- Bonnie Brennan (born c. 1973), CEO of Christie's
- Brent Brennan (born 1973), American college football head coach for San José State University
- Brian Brennan (author) (1943–2021), Irish-Canadian author and historian
- Brian Brennan (born 1962), former professional American football player
- Bríd Brennan (born 1953), North Irish actress
- Brídín Brennan (born 1968), Irish pop singer, younger sister of Enya

== C ==
- Cait Brennan (born 1969), American singer
- Judith Tarr (pen name Caitlin Brennan) (born 1955), American fantasy and science fiction author
- T. Casey Brennan (born 1948), American comic book writer
- Cecily Brennan (born 1955), Irish artist
- Charles Brennan (born 1967), Professor of Food Science at Lincoln University, New Zealand
- Charlie Brennan (born 2005), Jersey cricketer
- Chris Brennan (born 1971), American mixed martial artist
- Chrisann Brennan (born 1954), American painter and writer
- Christine Brennan (born 1958), sports columnist for the USA Today
- Christopher Brennan (sailor) (1832 – after 1863), Union Navy sailor in the American Civil War
- Christopher Brennan (1870–1932), Australian poet and scholar
- Ciarán Brennan (born 1954), Irish singer and musician
- Cindy Brennan, co-owner and managing partner of Mr. B's Bistro
- Claire Baker (née Brennan; born 1971), Scottish Labour Party politician
- Colleen Brennan (born 1949), American pornographic actress
- Colt Brennan (1983–2021), American football player
- Conor Brennan (born 1994), Northern Irish footballer
- Cormac Brennan (born 1995), Irish rugby union player

== D ==
- Dan Brennan (born 1962), Canadian NHL player
- Daniel Brennan, Baron Brennan (born 1942), British Labour life peer and barrister
- Darren Brennan (born 13 November 1996), Irish hurler
- Dean Brennan (born 1980), Irish footballer
- Debbie Brennan, British Paralympian athlete
- Denis Brennan (born 1945), Roman Catholic Bishop of Ferns
- Don Brennan, various people
- Donal Brennan (born 1986), Gaelic footballer
- Doreen Brennan, Irish camogie player
- Doug Brennan (1903–1972), Canadian professional hockey defenceman
- Duncan Brannan (born 1970), voice actor sometimes credited as Duncan Brennan

== E ==
- Eddie Brennan (born 1978), Irish hurling manager, sports broadcaster and former player
- Eddie Brennan (Gaelic footballer), Gaelic footballer
- Edward A. Brennan (1934–2007), chairman of the board, president (1980–1995) and CEO (1984–1995), of Sears, Roebuck and Co.
- Edward T. Brennan (1927–2015), American politician
- Eileen Brennan (1932–2013), American actress
- Ella Brennan (1925–2018), American restaurateur
- Eithne Brennan (born 1961), Irish singer best known as Enya
- Evie Brennan, American politician from Wyoming

== F ==
- Fanny Brennan (1921–2001), French-American surrealist painter
- Fran Brennan (born 1940), Irish soccer player
- Frank Brennan (disambiguation)
- Frederick Hazlitt Brennan (1901–1962), American screenwriter
- Fredrick Brennan, American computer programmer

== G ==
- Garth Brennan (born 1972), Australian professional rugby league football coach
- Gary Brennan, Manager of St. Patrick's G.A.A. Under 15's
- Gavin Brennan (born 1988), Irish footballer
- Geoffrey Brennan (1944–2022), professor of philosophy
- Georgianna Brennan, American journalist
- Ger Brennan, Irish Gaelic footballer
- Gerald Brennan (footballer) (1938–2022), Australian rules footballer
- Gerard Brennan (1928–2022), Justice and later Chief Justice of the High Court of Australia
- Gloria Brennan (1948–1985), Aboriginal community leader and public servant from Western Australia
- Gomeo Brennan (born 1939), Bahamian boxer of the 1950s, '60s and '70s

== H ==
- Harold Brennan (1905–1979), Australian politician
- Howard Brennan (1919–1983), witness to the assassination of U.S. President John F. Kennedy

== I ==
- Ian Brennan (disambiguation)
- Ivy Brennan, fictional character from the British soap opera Coronation Street

== J ==
- J. Keirn Brennan (1873–1948), American songwriter
- Jack Brennan (disambiguation)
- Jacob Brennan (born 1990), Australian rules footballer
- James Brennan (disambiguation)
- Jamie Brennan (born c. 1996/7), Irish Gaelic footballer
- Jane Brennan, Irish actress
- Jared Brennan (born 1984), Australian rules footballer
- Jason Brennan (born 1979), American philosopher and political scientist
- Jody Brennan (born 1983), Irish hurler
- John Brennan (disambiguation)
- Jon Brennan (born 1981), Jersey rugby player
- Joseph Brennan

== K ==
- Kathleen Brennan (born 1950), American musician
- Katie Brennan (born 1992), Australian rules footballer
- Keith Brennan (1915–1985), Australian diplomat
- Kevin Brennan (disambiguation)
- Killian Brennan (born 1984), Irish professional footballer
- Kim Brennan (born 1985), Australian rower
- Kip Brennan (born 1980), Canadian professional hockey enforcer
- Kitty Brennan (born 1950), American jurist
- Kate Lord-Brennan, member of the Legislative Council of the Isle of Man (from 2018)

== L ==
- Lee Brennan (born 1973), singer
- Liam Brennan, president of the Royal College of Anaesthetists (from 2015)
- Bishop Len Brennan, fictional character from the television series Father Ted
- Len Brennan (1911–1943), Australian rugby league player
- Leo Brennan (1925–2016) Irish showband musician, father of Enya, Brídín and several members of Clannad
- Les Brennan (born 1931), Australian rugby league footballer
- Les Brennan (Australian rules footballer) (1910–1992)
- Lesley Brennan, Scottish Labour Party politician
- Louis Brennan (1852–1932), 19th century inventor
- Luke Brennan (Australian footballer) (born 1985), Australian rules footballer
- Luke Brennan (English footballer) (born 2001), English footballer
- Lynwen Brennan (born 1967), American co-president of Lucasfilm

== M ==
- Mac Brennan (born 1990), American professional racing cyclist
- Maeve Brennan (1917–1993), Irish short story writer and journalist
- Margaret Brennan (disambiguation)
- Marie Brennan, American fantasy author
- Mark Brennan (disambiguation)
- Martin Brennan (disambiguation)
- Mary Brennan, various people
- Matt Brennan (disambiguation)
- Maureen Brennan (born 1954), English educator
- Maurice Brennan (1913–1986), British aerospace engineer
- Maurice B. Brennan (1842–1927), American politician
- Max Brennan (disambiguation)
- Megan Jane Brennan, Postmaster General of the United States (from 2015)
- Michael Brennan (disambiguation)
- Micky Brennan (born 1952), English professional footballer
- Mitch Brennan (born 1954), Australian rugby league footballer
- Moya Brennan (1952–2026), Irish folk singer, songwriter, and harpist; older sister of Enya
- Murray Brennan (born 1940), New Zealand surgeon, oncologist, cancer researcher, and academic
- Myles Brennan (born 1999), American football player

== N ==
- Nash Brennan, fictional character on the American drama One Life to Live
- Natasha Brennan (born 1986), English rugby union player
- Neal Brennan (born 1973), American writer, stand-up comedian, television director and producer
- Nelly Brennan (1792–1859), Manx washerwoman
- Nick Brennan, British cartoonist
- Nickey Brennan (born 1953), Irish hurler, manager and Gaelic games administrator
- Nigel Brennan (born 1972), Australian photojournalist and author
- Norman Brennan, serving police officer in London

== O ==
- Owen Brennan (footballer) (1877–1961), Australian rules footballer
- Owen Brennan (restaurateur) (1910–1955), New Orleans restaurateur

== P ==
- Paddy Brennan (born May 1981), Irish jockey
- Patricia Brennan (disambiguation)
- Patrick Brennan (disambiguation)
- Paudge Brennan (1922–1998), Irish Fianna Fáil politician
- Paul Brennan (disambiguation)
- Peter Brennan (disambiguation)
- Philip Brennan (disambiguation)
- Pól Brennan (born 1956), Irish singer, songwriter and producer

== R ==
- Ralph Brennan, New Orleans restaurateur and head of The Ralph Brennan Restaurant Group
- Reed Brennan, fictional character from the book series Private
- Richard Brennan (disambiguation)
- Robbie Brennan (1947–2016), Irish musician
- Robert Brennan (disambiguation)
- Roan Brennan, British para swimmer
- Rory Brennan (poet) (born 1945), Irish poet
- Rose Brennan (born 1931), Irish singer
- Rosie Brennan (born 1988), American cross country skier
- Rowan Brennan (born 1958), Papua New Guinean professional rugby league footballer

== S ==
- Samantha Brennan, British-born philosopher and scholar of women's studies
- Sarah Rees Brennan (born 1983), Irish writer
- Scott Brennan (disambiguation)
- Séamus Brennan (1948–2008), Fianna Fáil politician
- Síle Ní Bhraonáin (born 1983), television presenter
- Shane Brennan (born 1957), American and Australian television writer and producer
- Shay Brennan (1937–2000), Irish footballer
- Stella Brennan (born 1974), New Zealand artist, curator, and essayist
- Stephen Brennan (disambiguation)
- Stuart Brennan (born 1982), British actor, writer, producer and director

== T ==
- T. Corey Brennan (born 1959), associate professor of classics at Rutgers University
- T. J. Brennan (born 1989), American professional ice hockey defenseman
- Tad Brennan (born 1962), American philosopher
- Temperance "Bones" Brennan, fictional character from the television series Bones
- Terrance Brennan, Chef-Proprietor of the restaurants of The Artisanal Group
- Terry Brennan (1928–2021), American football player and coach
- Terry Brennan (politician) (1942–2020), Irish Fine Gael politician
- Thomas Brennan (disambiguation)
- Tim Brennan (born 1983), member of the Celtic punk group Dropkick Murphys
- Timothy M. Brennan (1959–2021), Compton police officer
- Tony Brennan (1916–1965), Irish hurler
- Tony Brennan (Gaelic footballer) (born 1944), Irish Gaelic footballer
- Trevor Brennan (born 1973), Irish rugby union player
- Tyler Brennan, fictional character from the Australian television soap opera Neighbours

== U ==
- Ursula Brennan (born 1952), British civil servant
- Úna Brennan (1888–1958), Irish republican and feminist

== V ==
- Vincent M. Brennan (1890–1959), US Representative from Michigan
- Virgil Brennan (1920–1943), Australian aviator

== W ==
- Walter Brennan (1894–1974), American actor
- Will Brennan (born 1998), American baseball player
- William Brennan (disambiguation)

== See also ==
- Brenan, given name and surname
- Brennen, given name and surname
