= Brennan =

Brennan may refer to:

== People ==
- Brennan (surname)
- Brennan (given name)
- Bishop Brennan (disambiguation)

== Places ==
- Brennan, Idlib, a village located in Sinjar Nahiyah in Maarrat al-Nu'man District, Idlib, Syria
- Rabeeah Brennan, a village located in Sinjar Nahiyah in Maarrat al-Nu'man District, Idlib, Syria
- Electoral division of Brennan, an electoral division of Australia's Northern Territory

== Other uses ==
- Brennan Award (disambiguation), various awards
- Brennan Helicopter, an experimental helicopter flown in the 1920s
- Brennan Motor Manufacturing Company of Syracuse, New York, a manufacturer of automobile engines from 1897 to 1972
- Brennan torpedo, a torpedo patented in 1877
- Brennan's, a creole restaurant in New Orleans, Louisiana
  - Brennan Family Restaurants, a group of restaurants operated by the Brennan family of New Orleans

== See also ==
- Brennen, a given name and surname
- Brenen, a given name and surname
