= Brenen =

Brenen is a given name and surname. Notable people with the name include:

- Bert Brenen (1915–1995), English footballer
- Brenen Thompson (born 2003), American football player

== See also ==
- Brennen, a given name and surname
- Brennan (disambiguation)
  - Brennan (given name)
  - Brennan (surname)
- Bremen, a city in northwestern Germany
