= John Brennan =

John Brennan may refer to:

== Public officials ==
- Jack Brennan (1937–2023), U.S. Marine officer and aide of Richard Nixon
- John O. Brennan (born 1955), former CIA director
- John P. Brennan (1864–1943), Democratic politician in the U.S. state of Ohio
- John Brennan Hussey (born 1934), former mayor of Shreveport, Louisiana
- John Joseph Brennan (1913–1976), Northern Ireland politician
- John Brennan (Irish senator) (1901–1977), Fianna Fáil politician
- John A. Brennan Jr. (born 1945), American lobbyist and Massachusetts politician

== Sports ==
- J. J. Brennan (1887–1943), Irish hurler
- John Brennan (Derry Gaelic footballer) (born 1942), Gaelic football manager and player
- John Brennan (Kerry Gaelic footballer), former Gaelic footballer
- Jack Brennan (footballer, born 1892) (1892–1942), English footballer for Bradford City and Manchester City
- John Brennan (American football) (1913–1982), American football player
- Jack Brennan (baseball) (1862–1914), American baseball catcher
- John Brennan (athlete) (1879–1964), American track and field athlete

== Artists ==
- Johnny Brennan (born 1961), American actor, screenwriter and voice actor
- John Wolf Brennan (born 1954), Irish pianist, organist and composer

== Other people ==
- John J. Brennan (businessman) (born 1954), chairman and CEO of The Vanguard Group
- John Calder Brennan (1908–1996), U.S. historian
- John Brennan (doctor) (c. 1768–1830), Irish doctor
- Sidney Czira (1889–1974), Irish journalist and revolutionary known by her pen name "John Brennan"
- John N. H. Brennan (1914–2010), Irish author, huntsman and solicitor
- John P. Brennan (priest) (c. 1836–1889), first American Catholic priest to declare bankruptcy
- John W. Brennan (born c. 1968), United States Army general

== See also ==
- John Brenan (disambiguation)
- John O'Brennan, Irish political scientist
