= Carrig =

Carrig may refer to:

- Carrig, County Tipperary, a settlement and electoral district in the historical Barony of Ormond Lower, North Tipperary, Ireland
- Carrig, a band of Paul Brennan

It is an Irish word meaning ‘rock’ and it is sometimes Anglicised as carrick.

== People with the surname ==
- Kacey Carrig (born 1992), American model
- John Carrig (born 1952), former chief operating officer and president for ConocoPhillips
