= James Brennan =

James Brennan may refer to:

== Politicians ==
- James F. Brennan (born 1952), American politician in the New York State Assembly
- James B. Brennan (1926–2021), American politician the Wisconsin State Senate
- James F. Brennan (mayor) (1916–2002), American politician, mayor of Somerville, Massachusetts
- James Brennan (Queensland politician) (1837–1917), Australian politician, member of the Queensland Legislative Assembly

== Sports ==
- Don Brennan (baseball) (James Donald Brennan, 1903–1953), American Major League Baseball pitcher
- Jim Brennan (baseball) (1862–1914), American baseball player
- Jim Brennan (Australian footballer) (1927–2013), Australian rules footballer
- Jim Brennan (born 1977), Canadian soccer player and manager, also known as Jimmy Brennan
- Jim Brennan (Northern Irish footballer) (1932–2009), Northern Irish footballer
- James Brennan (footballer) (1884–1917), Irish footballer
- Jamie Brennan (born c. 1996/7), Irish Gaelic footballer
- Séamus Ó Braonáin (Jimmy Brennan, 1881–1970), Irish sportsman and public figure
- Jim Brennan (rugby union), Irish international rugby union player

== Others ==
- James Herbert Brennan (1940–2024), Northern Irish lecturer and author
- James Alexander Brennan (1885–1956), American songwriter
- James Brennan, a character in the film Adventureland
