= Owen Brennan =

Owen Brennan may refer to:

- Owen Brennan (footballer) (1877–1961), Australian rules footballer
- Owen Brennan (restaurateur) (1910–1955), American restaurateur
