= Brenan =

Brenan is a surname and a given name. Notable people with the name include:

== Surname ==
- Gerald Brenan (1894–1987), British writer and Hispanist
- James Brenan (1837–1907), Irish artist
- Ryan Brenan (1798–1868), Australian politician from New South Wales
- John Brenan (physician) (1768?- 1830), Irish physician
- John Patrick Micklethwait Brenan (1917–1985), British botanist
- Joseph Brenan (1828–1857), Irish writer and nationalist
- Michael John Brenan (1780–1847), Irish Roman Catholic priest and historian

== Given name ==
- Brenan (author) (fl. 1756)
- Brenan Espartinez, Filipino singer
- Brenan Cruse, American singer

== See also ==
- Brennan (given name)
- Brennan (surname)
