= 2000–01 Charlton Athletic F.C. season =

Charlton Athletic F.C.
2000–01 season
- Chairman: Richard Murray
- Manager: Alan Curbishley
- Stadium: The Valley
- FA Premier League: 9th
- FA Cup: Fourth round
- League Cup: Second round
- Player of the Year: Richard Rufus
- Top goalscorer: League: Jonatan Johansson (11); All: Jonatan Johansson (14)
- Lowest home attendance: 10,037 (vs. Stoke City, 26 September)
- Average home league attendance: 20,020
Home colours	Away colours	Third colours

During the 2000–01 English football season, Charlton Athletic competed in the FA Premier League. The club also competed in the FA Cup, and the League Cup.

== Season summary ==
Alan Curbishley and his Charlton side won their Division One title and were promoted back to the FA Premier League at the first time of asking. This time he kept them there with a ninth-place finish and 52 points. Still, it was an achievement for a side who were tipped by many punters to immediately relegate to the Nationwide League. The arrival of striker Jason Euell from Wimbledon in a club record deal gave fans hope of more success in 2001–02.

== Kit ==
Charlton's kit was manufactured by Le Coq Sportif and sponsored by Redbus.

== Final league table ==
Pos	Team	Pld	W	D	L	GF	GA	GD	Pts	Qualification or relegation
7	Sunderland	38	15	12	11	46	41	+5	57	
8	Aston Villa	38	13	15	10	46	43	+3	54	Qualification for the Intertoto Cup third round
9	Charlton Athletic	38	14	10	14	50	57	−7	52	
10	Southampton	38	14	10	14	40	48	−8	52	
11	Newcastle United	38	14	9	15	44	50	−6	51	Qualification for the Intertoto Cup third round

Source: Premier League
Rules for classification: 1) points; 2) goal difference; 3) number of goals scored.

Results summary

Overall								Home						Away					
Pld	W	D	L	GF	GA	GD	Pts	W	D	L	GF	GA	GD	W	D	L	GF	GA	GD
38	14	10	14	50	57	−7	52	11	5	3	31	19	+12	3	5	11	19	38	−19

Source: 2000-01 FA Premier League table

Results by round

Round	1	2	3	4	5	6	7	8	9	10	11	12	13	14	15	16	17	18	19	20	21	22	23	24	25	26	27	28	29	30	31	32	33	34	35	36	37	38
Ground	H	A	A	H	A	H	A	H	A	H	A	H	A	H	H	A	H	A	H	A	A	H	A	H	H	A	H	A	A	H	H	A	A	H	A	H	A	H
Result	W	L	L	D	D	W	W	D	L	W	L	W	L	W	L	L	D	L	W	L	W	W	D	D	W	D	W	D	D	L	W	L	L	D	W	W	L	L
Position	1	6	14	13	13	8	5	7	8	7	10	8	9	7	10	13	13	13	13	13	10	8	9	8	8	10	7	8	8	10	8	9	9	9	9	8	9	9

Source: 11v11.com: 2000-01 Charlton Athletic results
A = Away; H = Home; W = Win; D = Draw; L = Loss

== Results ==
Charlton Athletic's score comes first

=== Legend ===
Win	Draw	Loss

=== FA Premier League ===
Date	Opponent	Venue	Result	Attendance	Scorers
19 August 2000	Manchester City	H	4-0	20,043	Hunt, Robinson, Kinsella, Stuart (pen)
23 August 2000	Everton	A	0-3	36,300	
26 August 2000	Arsenal	A	3-5	38,025	Hunt (2), Stuart
6 September 2000	Southampton	H	1-1	20,043	Johansson
10 September 2000	Derby County	A	2-2	22,310	Jensen, Johansson
16 September 2000	Tottenham Hotspur	H	1-0	20,043	Johansson
23 September 2000	Newcastle United	A	1-0	50,866	Stuart
30 September 2000	Coventry City	H	2-2	20,043	Hunt, Johansson
14 October 2000	Leeds United	A	1-3	38,837	Jensen
21 October 2000	Middlesbrough	H	1-0	20,043	Svensson
28 October 2000	Aston Villa	A	1-2	27,461	Dublin (own goal)
4 November 2000	Bradford City	H	2-0	19,655	Johansson, Stuart
11 November 2000	Ipswich Town	A	0-2	22,263	
18 November 2000	Chelsea	H	2-0	20,043	Johansson, Pringle
25 November 2000	Sunderland	H	0-1	20,043	
2 December 2000	Liverpool	A	0-3	43,515	
9 December 2000	Manchester United	H	3-3	20,043	Bartlett (2), Robinson
16 December 2000	Leicester City	A	1-3	19,371	Johansson
23 December 2000	Everton	H	1-0	20,043	Svensson
26 December 2000	West Ham United	A	0-5	35,704	
30 December 2000	Manchester City	A	4-1	30,499	Johansson (2), Stuart (pen), Jensen
1 January 2001	Arsenal	H	1-0	20,043	Johansson
13 January 2001	Southampton	A	0–0	15,220	
22 January 2001	West Ham United	H	1-1	20,043	Bartlett
30 January 2001	Derby County	H	2-1	20,043	Svensson, Parker
3 February 2001	Tottenham Hotspur	A	0-0	35,368	
11 February 2001	Newcastle United	H	2-0	20,043	Svensson, Bartlett
24 February 2001	Coventry City	A	2-2	19,480	Rufus, Johansson
3 March 2001	Middlesbrough	A	0-0	28,177	
17 March 2001	Leeds United	H	1-2	20,043	Bartlett
1 April 2001	Leicester City	H	2-0	20,043	Todd, Bartlett
10 April 2001	Manchester United	A	1-2	67,505	Fish
13 April 2001	Bradford City	A	0-2	17,511	
17 April 2001	Aston Villa	H	3-3	20,043	Boateng (own goal), Jensen (pen), Kinsella
21 April 2001	Chelsea	A	1-0	34,983	Bartlett
30 April 2001	Ipswich Town	H	2-1	20,043	Svensson, Rufus
5 May 2001	Sunderland	A	2-3	47,671	Svensson, Jensen
19 May 2001	Liverpool	H	0-4	20,043	

=== FA Cup ===
Round	Date	Opponent	Venue	Result	Attendance	Goalscorers
R3	6 January 2001	Dagenham & Redbridge	H	1-1	19,059	Salako
R3R	27 January 2001	Dagenham & Redbridge	A	1-0 (a.e.t.)	5,394	Newton
R4	7 February 2001	Tottenham Hotspur	H	2-4	24,637	Powell, Svensson

=== League Cup ===
Round	Date	Opponent	Venue	Result	Attendance	Goalscorers
R2 1st Leg	20 September 2000	Stoke City	A	1-2	9,388	Johansson
R2 2nd Leg	26 September 2000	Stoke City	H	4-3 (lost on away goals)	10,037	Lisbie (2), Johansson (2)

== Players ==
=== First-team squad ===
Squad at end of season

Note: Flags indicate national team as defined under FIFA eligibility rules; some limited exceptions apply. Players may hold more than one non-FIFA nationality.

No.	Pos.	Nation	Player
1	GK	IRL	Dean Kiely (Note: Kiely was born in Salford, England, and represented them at U-15, U-16, and U-18 level, but also qualified to represent the Republic of Ireland internationally and made his international debut for the Republic of Ireland in November 1999.)
2	DF	BUL	Radostin Kishishev
3	DF	ENG	Chris Powell
4	MF	ENG	Graham Stuart
5	DF	ENG	Richard Rufus
7	MF	ENG	Shaun Newton
8	MF	IRL	Mark Kinsella (captain)
9	FW	ENG	Andy Hunt
10	FW	ENG	Clive Mendonca
11	MF	WAL	John Robinson (Note: Robinson was born in Bulawayo, Rhodesia (now Zimbabwe), but also qualified to represent Wales internationally and represented them at U-21 level before making his international debut for Wales in 1995.)
12	DF	ENG	Steve Brown
13	GK	YUG	Saša Ilić (Note: Ilić was born in Melbourne, Australia, but also qualified to represent FR Yugoslavia internationally and made his international debut for FR Yugoslavia in December 1998.)
14	FW	SWE	Martin Pringle
15	DF	ENG	Eddie Youds
16	DF	SCO	Greg Shields
17	MF	ENG	Scott Parker
18	DF	ENG	Paul Konchesky

No.	Pos.	Nation	Player
19	DF	ENG	Andy Todd
20	MF	DEN	Claus Jensen
21	FW	FIN	Jonatan Johansson
22	GK	ENG	Ben Roberts
23	DF	ENG	Anthony Allman
24	DF	ENG	Jonathan Fortune
26	FW	SWE	Mathias Svensson
28	MF	ENG	John Salako (Note: Salako was born in Ibadan, Nigeria, but also qualified to represent England internationally and made his international debut for England in 1991.)
29	FW	ENG	Kevin Lisbie (Note: Lisbie was born in Hackney, England, but also qualified to represent Jamaica internationally and would make his international debut for Jamaica in 2002.)
30	FW	ENG	Charlie MacDonald
31	MF	IRN	Karim Bagheri
32	DF	NGA	Danny Shittu
33	MF	ENG	David Collis
34	FW	ENG	Mark Royal
35	GK	ENG	Tony Caig
36	DF	RSA	Mark Fish
37	FW	RSA	Shaun Bartlett (on loan from FC Zürich)

=== Left club during season ===
Note: Flags indicate national team as defined under FIFA eligibility rules; some limited exceptions apply. Players may hold more than one non-FIFA nationality.

No.	Pos.	Nation	Player
6	DF	ENG	Carl Tiler (to Portsmouth)
25	FW	ENG	Leigh Hales (to Dover Athletic)

No.	Pos.	Nation	Player
27	MF	ENG	Kemal Izzet (to Colchester United)

=== Reserve squad ===
Note: Flags indicate national team as defined under FIFA eligibility rules; some limited exceptions apply. Players may hold more than one non-FIFA nationality.

No.	Pos.	Nation	Player
—	GK	ENG	Martin Brennan
—	GK	ENG	Jason Brown (Note: Brown was born in Southwark, England, but also qualified to represent Wales internationally through his grandmother and represented them at U-21 level before making his international debut for Wales in May 2006.)
—	DF	ENG	Michael Turner

No.	Pos.	Nation	Player
—	MF	NIR	Neil McCafferty
—	FW	ENG	Mark DeBolla

== Statistics ==
=== Starting 11 ===
Considering starts in all competitions

- GK: #1, (Republic of Ireland) Dean Kiely, 28
- RB: #2, (Bulgaria) Radostin Kishishev, 28
- CB: #5, (England) Richard Rufus, 35
- CB: #36, (South Africa) Mark Fish, 28
- LB: #3, (England) Chris Powell, 33
- RM: #20, (Denmark) Claus Jensen, 41
- CM: #4, (England) Graham Stuart, 35
- CM: #8, (Republic of Ireland) Mark Kinsella, 27
- LM: #11, (Wales) John Robinson, 23
- CF: #21, (Finland) Jonatan Johansson, 29
- CF: #26, (Sweden) Mathias Svensson, 20 (#19, (England) Andy Todd, has 24 starts as a central defender)

== Transfers ==
=== In ===
Date	Pos	Name	From	Fee
13 July 2000	GK	Ben Roberts	Middlesbrough	Free transfer
20 July 2000	MF	Claus Jensen	Bolton Wanderers	£4,000,000
31 July 2000	FW	Jonatan Johansson	Rangers	£3,750,000
5 August 2000	DF	Radostin Kishishev	Litex Lovech	£300,000
14 August 2000	MF	Karim Bagheri	Persepolis	£400,000
8 November 2000	DF	Mark Fish	Bolton Wanderers	£700,000
8 January 2001	GK	Tony Caig	Blackpool	Free transfer
26 January 2001	FW	Mark DeBolla	Aston Villa	Free transfer

=== Out ===
Date	Pos	Name	To	Fee
7 June 2000	GK	Sam Turner	Stockport County	Free transfer
3 July 2000	MF	Keith Jones	Reading	Free transfer
4 July 2000	DF	Anthony Barness	Bolton Wanderers	Free transfer
11 July 2000	GK	Simon Royce	Leicester City	Free transfer
14 July 2000	FW	Mark McCammon	Brentford	£100,000
22 August 2000	FW	Kevin James	Gillingham	Free transfer
13 March 2001	DF	Carl Tiler	Portsmouth	£250,000
16 March 2001	GK	Jason Brown	Gillingham	Free transfer
13 April 2001	MF	Kemal Izzet	Colchester United	Free transfer

Transfers in: ▼£9,150,000
Transfers out: ▲£350,000
Total spending: ▼£8,800,000

=== Loan out ===
- (England) Kevin Lisbie - (England) Queens Park Rangers, 2 December, one month
- (England) Kemal Izzet - (England) Colchester United, 22 March, one month
