= John Brenan =

John Brenan may refer to:

- John Brenan (bishop) (died 1693), Irish Roman Catholic archbishop
- Ryan Brenan (John Ryan Brenan, 1798–1868), Australian politician
- John Brenan (physician) (1768–1830), Irish physician
- John Fitzgerald Brenan (1883–1953), British diplomat in China
- John Patrick Micklethwait Brenan (1917–1985), British botanist

== See also ==
- John Brennan (disambiguation)
- Michael John Brenan (1780–1847), Roman Catholic priest and ecclesiastical historian
