= Paul Brennan =

Paul Brennan may refer to:

== Musicians ==
- Paul Brennan (Canadian musician), drummer
- Paul Brennan (Northern Ireland musician), traditional musician from County Down
- Pól Brennan (born 1956, occasionally credited as Paul Brennan), Irish singer, songwriter, and producer from County Donegal

== Others ==
- Paul Brennan (academic) (1939–2003), Irish academic
- Paul Brennan (Gaelic footballer) (born c. 1988/9), Irish footballer playing for Donegal and Réalt na Mara
- Paul Brennan (Fair City), a fictional character in the Irish soap opera
- Virgil Brennan (1920–1943), also known as Paul Brennan, Australian aviator
