= Matt Brennan =

Matt or Matthew Brennan may refer to:

- Matt Brennan (politician) (born 1936), Irish politician
- Matt Brennan (academic) (born 1979), Canadian author, musician, and academic
- Matt Brennan (American football) (1897–1963), American football back
- Matt Brennan (footballer) (born 1943), Scottish footballer
- Matthew Brennan (cyclist) (born 2005) British cyclist, junior world record holder
- Matthew Brennan, namesake of Mount Brennan
