= Francis Brennan =

Francis Brennan may refer to:

- Francis Brennan (cardinal) (1894–1968), American cardinal of the Roman Catholic Church
- Francis Brennan (hotelier) (born 1953), flamboyant Irish television personality
- Francis Gerard Brennan (1928–2022), Australian lawyer

== See also ==
- Frank Brennan (disambiguation)
