= Reformed Priests Protection Society =

Clerical charity in Ireland

The Reformed Priests Protection Society was a charity founded in 1844 to support former Roman Catholic priests who converted to the Church of Ireland. It was also known as the Priests' Protection Society for Ireland or the Reformed Romanist Priests' Protection Society. The Society had four objects:

1. to "protect Priests of good character, who conscientiously abandon the Church of Rome for the pure faith of the Gospel" and to find positions for them in parishes or as missionaries
2. to "afford protection and education" to men who abandon studying for the Roman Catholic priesthood "in consequence of the influence of divine truth"
3. to promote "Scriptural and anti-popish instruction" through sermons and pamphlets
4. to "reform Romish Priests" worldwide

The Society's first secretary was Rev. Thomas Scott, and its first patron was Robert Jocelyn, 3rd Earl of Roden, a leading evangelical within the Second Reformation of Anglicanism, who said that the Society helped "unfortunate men [who] would be persecuted by the Church they left, and suspected by that which they joined". Its foundation on 5 May 1844 was marked by a service in St. Audoen's Church of Ireland church in which "the Rev. Solomon Frost renounced Popery". Scott was curate of St. Audoen's parish from 1831 to 1848, and maintained a parish register instigated by Mortimer O'Sullivan in 1827 listing such conversion services. In the three years after Frost, Scott recorded the conversion at St. Audoen's of four more priests, a monk, and two seminarians. Although Michael John Brenan was said by the Catholic Encyclopedia to have been supported by the Priests' Protection Society in the interval from his conversion to his recantation, in fact this was in 1809, decades before the Society's foundation.

The Society's tracts were published by the "Religious Book and Tract Depository for Ireland", which shared its office and library on Sackville Street (now O'Connell Street) in Dublin. It was critical of the Catholic Church's ethos and practice, and hostile to St Patrick's College, Maynooth, the seminary of the Irish Roman Catholic hierarchy. It opposed the Maynooth Grant and other government policies conciliatory to Roman Catholicism in Ireland. The society nominated several former Maynooth students to give evidence to the 1853–1855 Royal Commission into the college. Among these were Denis Leyne Brasbie and W. J. Burke, who had converted prior to the society's formation and became early beneficiaries and advocates of its work. In 1844 proselytism around Dingle by the Irish Society for Promoting the Education of the Native Irish through the Medium of Their Own Language worried Bishop Cornelius Egan, who sent Brasbie as curate to bolster the ministry of Keelmelchedar (Kilmalkedar) parish. When Brasbie himself publicly converted, there was public unrest which made him fear for his safety, and he remained notorious in the local folk memory.

By the 1870s the Society claimed to have supported over 100 converts, between priests and students. Thomas Scott was succeeded as secretary by Robert Wade Thompson, a justice of the peace and militia captain. In the 1920s Catholic priest E.J. Quigley that, although "[p]ossibly the Society has still members, clerks, secretary and fund", it was "an extinct volcano". Quigley claimed there had only been 29 converted priests, of whom 12 were Irish, "about six" English, and the balance from the continent, including Alessandro Gavazzi and Giacinto Achilli; "the apostate priests of Europe ... made Dublin their Mecca, and received woollens and wives from the Society".

The Society is mentioned in James Joyce's novel Ulysses, in one of the "hallucinations" in the "Circe" episode, when Dr Dixon says that "Professor Bloom is a finished example of the new womanly man. ... He has written a really beautiful letter, a poem in itself, to the court missionary of the Reformed Priests Protection Society". This reflects a stereotypical association by Irish nationalists during the Gaelic revival of West Britonism with effeminacy; It may also allude to the New York Society for the Suppression of Vice, which had funded a 1921 obscenity suit against The Little Review for publishing draft excerpts from Ulysses.

As of 18 September 2017 the Reformed Priests Protection Society remains a registered charity with an address "care of the Irish Church Missions".
