= Jack Brennan (disambiguation) =

Jack Brennan (1937–2023) was a United States Marine Corps officer and political aide.

Jack Brennan may also refer to:

- Jack Brennan (baseball) (1862–1914), American baseball catcher
- Jack Brennan (footballer, born 1892) (1892–1942), English footballer
- Jack Brennan (Australian footballer) (1897–1987), Australian rules footballer
- Jack Brennan (rugby league) (1935/1936–2025), English rugby league footballer
- Jack Brennan (General Hospital), a fictional character

== See also ==
- John Brennan (disambiguation)
