= Thomas Brennan =

Thomas or Tom Brennan may refer to:

- Thomas Brennan (Irish Land League) (1853–1912), Irish politician
- Thomas Brennan (Fianna Fáil politician) (1886–1953), Irish politician
- Thomas Brennan (Victorian state politician) (1900–1966), Victorian state MP
- Thomas Brennan (footballer) (1911–?), Scottish professional footballer
- Thomas Brennan (equestrian) (1940–2014), Irish equestrian
- Thomas E. Brennan (1929–2018), American jurist, Chief Justice of the Michigan Supreme Court
- Thomas Francis Brennan (1855–1916), American Catholic bishop; 1st Catholic bishop of Dallas 1891–1893
- Tom Brennan (politician) (1866–1944), Australian Senator
- Tom Brennan (basketball, born 1930) (1930–1990), basketball player for Villanova University and the Philadelphia Warriors
- Tom Brennan (basketball, born 1949) (born 1949), American sportscaster and former University of Vermont basketball coach
- Tom Brennan (baseball) (born 1952), 1980s baseball player
- Tom Brennan (civil servant) (1928–2013), Oklahoma civil servant and businessman
- Tom Brennan (footballer), English soccer player
- Tom Brennan (ice hockey) (1922–2003), American ice hockey player for Boston Bruins
- Tom Brennan (speedway rider) (born 2001), British speedway rider
- Thom Brennan (born 1957), American musician
- Tommy Brennan (trade unionist) (1932–2022), Scottish political activist
- Tommy Brennan, American comedian and cast member on Saturday Night Live
- Tom Brennan (barge), a 1949 barge used in outback South Australia during flooding of Coppers Creek

== See also ==
- Thomas Brannan (1893–1960), English rugby league footballer of the 1910s and 1920s
