= Arthur Brennan =

Australian rules footballer

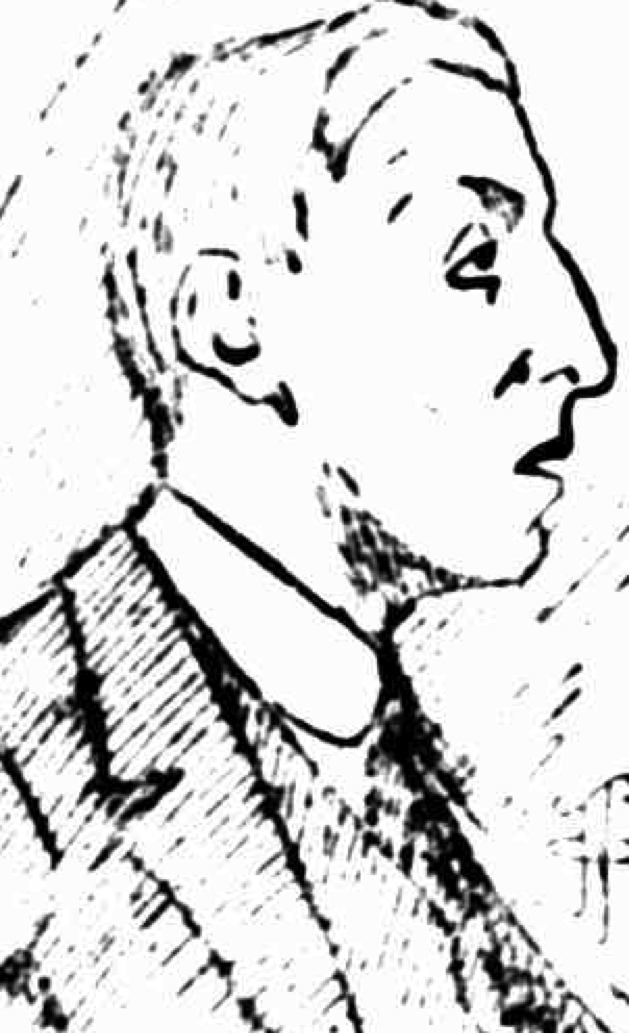

Personal information
- Full name: Arthur Brennan
- Born: 2 March 1881; Abbotsford, Victoria
- Died: 12 September 1931 (aged 50); North Fitzroy, Victoria
- Height: 179 cm (5 ft 10 in)

Playing career^{1}
Years	Club	Games (Goals)
1901	St Kilda	1 (0)
- ^{1} Playing statistics correct to the end of 1901.

Arthur Brennan (2 March 1881 – 12 September 1931) was an Australian rules footballer who played with St Kilda in the Victorian Football League (VFL). He also played for Richmond, Port Melbourne, and Footscray in the Victorian Football Association (VFA).

== Personal life ==
The son of William Brennan, and Mary Brennan, née O'Farrell, Arthur Brennan was born in Abbotsford, Victoria on 2 March 1881.

He came from a large family; William and Mary had eight daughters and three sons. Both of his brothers played football, most notably Owen Brennan, who was the first member of the family to play in the VFL, with 11 appearances for Collingwood in 1900. His other brother, William Jr, played in the VFA for Northcote and Port Melbourne.

== Football career ==
Brennan played his only senior game for St Kilda during the 1901 VFL season as a 20-year-old. In round 15, Brennan was a member of the St Kilda team which lost to Fitzroy at Junction Oval by 72 points.

Although his VFL career was brief, Brennan played for a number of years in the VFA. He was regarded as being one of Richmond's finest players in their pre-VFL era, a club he played for from 1903 to 1905. In 1906 and 1907, Brennan played with his brother William at Port Melbourne, then midway through the 1908 VFA season, he crossed to Footscray.

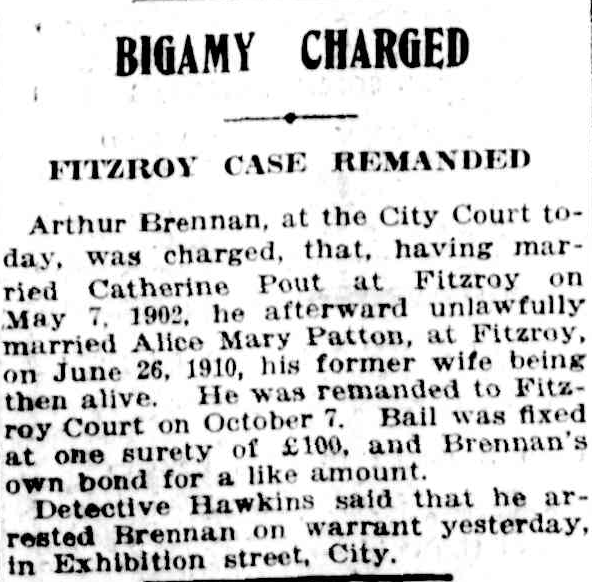
The Herald, Melbourne, 30 September 1914.

== Bigamy trial ==
Arrested on 29 September 1914, Brennan was committed for trial on 7 October 1914, on a charge of having committed bigamy.

At his trial, evidence was given that the Rev. Henry Heathershaw had married Arthur Brennan to his first wife, Catherine Prout, on 7 May 1902, and that Brennan had left her after two years.

Further evidence was given by Alice Mary Patton, who appeared in court having been brought from Pentridge Women's Prison Gaol in order to do so, that, while Brennan was still married to Catherine (and while Catherine was still alive), the Rev. Albert James Abbott married her to Brennan on 23 January 1910, and that they had had a child together, which died in its infancy.

Having initially pleaded "not guilty" to the charge, he later changed his plea to guilty, on the advice of his solicitor, Napthali Henry "Sonny" Sonenberg, and was consequently sentenced to 12 months imprisonment.

== Military service ==
=== 1915 ===
Brennan enlisted in the First AIF on 3 September 1915. At this (initial) enlistment, he answered "no" to the question "Are you married?" He entered camp at Royal Park, Melbourne on 13 September 1915.

At Carlton court yesterday [viz., 20 October 1915], Arthur Brennan and Catherine Brennan, a married couple, were each fined 20/, in default seven days' imprisonment, for having unlawfully assaulted Ellen Steele.
Complainant, a resident of Pelham-street, said accused assaulted her in the street on 19th [October], the male accused hitting her on the side with a policeman's baton.
Brennan, who denied the charge, said he found the baton in Little Bourke-street.
On a charge of wilfully damaging the property of William Steele, engineer's laborer, by breaking the panel of the door and breaking nine panes of glass, Arthur Brennan was also fined £3, in default one month's imprisonment; and on a charge of having used insulting words, Catherine Brennan was fined 20/, in default seven days in gaol.

— The Age, 21 October 1915.

Brennan was discovered to be absent without leave on 24 November 1915, and was "struck off strength of [the] Royal Park Camp as a deserter on 30/11/15 — a decision later confirmed by a Court of Inquiry — and a warrant was issued for his arrest."

=== 1918 ===
Although no further details are given, his service record indicates that the warrant for his arrest was withdrawn on 4 March 1918, and that he re-enlisted on 27 March, and that he resumed his military service on 29 April. At the time of his 1918 re-enlistment, the previous "no" answer to the "Are you married?" question was crossed out and replaced with "yes" — and "Catherine Brennan", of "30 Madeline Street, Carlton, Vic.", "Wife", was now given as his next of kin.

He left Sydney, with the 2nd General (Victorian) Reinforcements, on 1 May 1918, aboard the HMAT Euripides A14, to serve in Europe.

In August 1918, whilst still in England, he was charged with being absent without leave and was imprisoned without pay for 28 days.

In September 1918, soon after arriving in France, he was imprisoned for three days without pay for "conduct to the prejudice of good order and military discipline in that he discharged firearms in his hut on 23.9.18"; and in October 1918, he was imprisoned, again, for being absent without leave. He was absent without leave, once more, from 26 October 1918 until he was arrested on 18 November 1918.

=== Court-martial ===
Brennan and a fellow soldier, Private Patrick McGrath (51412), were arrested in November 1918, and put on trial, in France, after they had forcibly entered an estaminet in Saint-Vaast, on the night of 29 October 1918.

Both were found guilty of "committing an offence against the property of an inhabitant of the country in which he was serving", and both were sentenced to two years imprisonment with hard labour; a sentence which Brennan served, at the Northampton Military Prison, in England.

His sentence was suspended, and he was released from prison on 18 June 1919 under the powers provided by the "Suspension of Sentences" provisions (i.e., Regulations 643A and 643B) of the Australian Military Regulations under the Defence Act 1903–1915 that had come into operation on 7 March 1917, and was returned to his regiment and then repatriated (with his regiment) to Australia in the HMAT Port Melbourne, leaving England on 5 July 1919, and landing in Melbourne on 20 August.

== Murder ==
The Brennan household, which consisted of Arthur and five of his sisters, had an arrangement with their immediate neighbour, Norah Power, that, if she was alone and in need of assistance, she would knock on the wall which divided their homes.

=== 12 September 1931 ===
On 12 September 1931, Brennan was shot dead outside his home, at 26 Rowe Street, North Fitzroy, by a burglar who was trying to get into Power's residence. That night, Power had been alarmed by the sound of someone trying to get through her window. Brennan was in his kitchen and, once he heard Power's signal, walked across his garden to her home. He confronted a man he saw standing on Power's verandah who attempted unsuccessfully to defuse the situation by claiming he was at the home to visit a friend. When he tried to make his escape, Brennan blocked his path at the garden gate and the pair then grappled. During the struggle, Brennan was shot in the chest by a small automatic pistol that the intruder had managed to draw from his overcoat with a free arm. Brennan died on the footpath within minutes. The gunman was chased by two other bystanders but was able to get away.

=== Search for suspect ===
An investigation revealed that the gunman, likely aged 25 to 30, had earlier been seen scoping the area and was, therefore, able to get a good description of his appearance. The police were unable to locate the suspect; and, after three months had elapsed, the City Coroner gave a finding that Brennan had been murdered by a "person unknown".

== Alleged perpetrators ==
Although the case remains unsolved today, the Victorian police sequentially identified (albeit posthumously) two known criminals as Brennan's murderer, first, at the time of his death, John Gepp, then, later, when that allegation had been retracted, Reginald James Barker, although no evidence supporting either of these official allegations was ever presented in court.

=== John Gepp, alias John Vernon Pinkus, alias Raymond Brennan, alias John D'Arcy ===
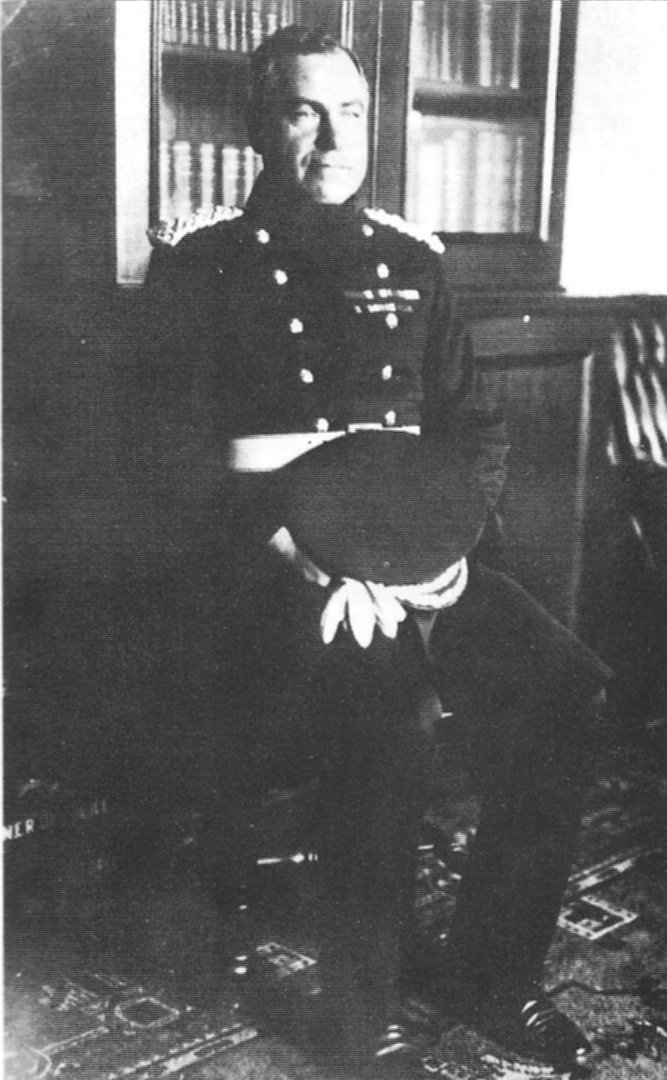
Major General Thomas Blamey, Chief Commissioner of the Victorian Police Force

John Gepp (1898–1932), alias John Vernon Pinkus, alias Raymond Brennan, alias John D'Arcy, was shot dead on 18 January while escaping from the police who had attempted to apprehend him outside his Clifton Hill residence (apparently in order to arrest him for Brennan's murder). In his attempt to evade arrest, he fled the scene, and was badly injured when attempting to clear an iron spiked fence at the Jolimont railway station; and, bleeding profusely, he then ran into an adjacent park, "turned in his tracks and fired a shot at his pursuers". The police returned fire ("The staff at the Jolimont station heard the report of a shot and then a fusillade") killing Gepp.

At the time of his death, police stated that "[they were] now certain from information which has come to hand that [Gepp] was the prowler who on September 12 last murdered Arthur Brennan in front of his home in Howe Street, North Fitzroy". However, in April 1932, once forensic evidence had revealed that Gepp's gun had not fired the bullet that killed Brennan, the police had become convinced "beyond all reasonable doubt that [Gepp] was not the murderer of Arthur Brennan". On 15 April 1932, Thomas Blamey, the Chief Commissioner of the Victorian Police Force, formally announced that Gepp was no longer considered to be Brennan's murderer.

=== Reginald James Barker ===
Reginald James Barker (1914–1932) was shot dead on 27 February 1932 while attempting to escape from Pentridge Prison in the company of two other prisoners (who, although not shot, also failed to escape). Having stolen a warder's rifle, he wounded two of the prison's warders in the process.

Although just 17½, he was more than 6 feet tall and was strongly built; and "despite his youth, [he] was described by police [at the time of his death] as being one of the most desperate young criminals who had passed through their hands in recent years" Having previously been convicted of a number of crimes (including firearms offences, and breaking and entering), for which he had (already) served several long terms in detention centres, he was in prison awaiting sentencing, having been found guilty of (a) shooting at a police constable with the intent to murder him, and (b) stealing a motorcycle and sidecar.

On Friday 15 April 1932, in the process of declaring that Gepp was no longer considered to be Brennan's murderer, Police Commissioner Blamey also announced that, "as a result of investigations by detectives it had been clearly established that the murderer of Arthur Brennan in Fitzroy on September 12, 1931, was Reginald James Barker".

The police base their theory that Barker shot Brennan largely on the fact that experts have decided that the bullet extracted from Brennan's chest by the Government pathologist (Dr. C.H. Mollison) was fired from a .25 automatic Colt pistol, which was found in Barker's possession and which was identified as having been stolen from Donald Mackintosh's gun shop in Bourke Street. While inquiring into Barker's death. detectives were told by other prisoners serving sentences at [Pentridge] gaol that Barker was the man who had shot Brennan.
["It was while the police were making inquiries into [Barker's] death that they were given information which led to their report implicating Barker. The police report was based on the statements of several of Barker's fellow prisoners, who allegedly told the detectives that Barker had admitted the murder, and was worried because he thought the police would have a revolver, which had been found in his possession earlier, examined, and, by comparison with the bullet taken from Brennan's head, learn that he was the murderer. He also feared, the prisoners are alleged to have said, that the police would find his overcoat at home, and have it identified by Miss Power."]
[The prisoners] said that they thought that Barker was under the impression that a large sum of money was kept in the house occupied by Miss Power, in Rowe Street, North Fitzroy, next door to Mr. Brennan's house, and that he thought that Mr Brennan was a policeman.
When Miss Power was shown Barker's photograph recently it is said that she exclaimed "That is the man who shot Mr. Brennan. I knew that the man the police shot at Jolimont was not the murderer of Mr. Brennan."
At the conclusion of a report made by members of the criminal investigation branch it is stated:- "After making inquiries into this matter we have no hesitation in stating that Barker was the man who shot Arthur Brennan."
The Argus, 16 April 1932.

Prompted by Blamey's emphatic declaration, Barker's mother visited the office of The Herald on the following Monday (18 April 1932), and produced documentary evidence, in the form of a medical report from Dr. Edward James Grieve, the Medical Superintendent of St Vincent's Hospital, Melbourne — the veracity of the report's contents were (subsequently) confirmed directly with Dr. Grieve by The Herald. — to the effect that, on his first of seven visits to the hospital (10 September 1931), Barker was extremely lame and was given crutches (Grieve told the reporter that the injury was so severe that "he was surprised that Barker had been able to reach the hospital unassisted. 'It was a wonder that he could walk at all', said Dr. Grieve.") An X-ray taken on 11 September 1931 showed a fracture, that was some weeks old, of both bones of his right ankle; and on 14 September his leg was put in plaster of Paris. Mrs Barker told The Herald that she had specifically told the detectives, at the time of the coroner's inquest, of her son's injured foot, and that, following that, they could have checked her story with the doctor before coming to their final conclusion.

His mother declared that, at 17 years of age, 6 feet tall, and well-built, her son was significantly different from the "official description of Brennan's murderer [that witnesses had] given police ... between 25 and 30 years old, 5 feet 9 inches in height, and of thin to medium build"; and, moreover, that, "apart from the difference in description, ... her son, from the hospital report, obviously could not have been the prowler who frightened Miss Norah Power, who lived next door to Brennan, on September 12; and he could not possibly have run away after having shot Brennan, as witnesses said Brennan's murderer had done".

Mrs. Barker further declared that the police claim that they had traced Brennan's murder weapon to Barker's home was false: "She said that the detectives who visited her home after her son's death had taken only a grey overcoat — the overcoat which, according to the police, Miss Power later identified. She [viz., Mrs. Barker] had never seen a revolver in the house".

In explaining why she had come to The Herald, "with a medical report which, she claimed, showed that her son could not have been guilty of the murder of Arthur Brennan, 48, as alleged by the police" — "'In their endeavor to clear Pinkus', said Mrs Barker, 'the police have put the blame for n terrible crime on my boy, who, whatever else he might have done, was not a murderer. The detectives were told, outside the Morgue at the inquest, about my son's foot injury, and they could have seen the doctors before having made [the report that they submitted to the Police Commissioner]' — "Mrs. Barker said that she had sought [earlier] today to place [Grieve's] report before the Police Commissioner (General Blamey) but that he had refused an interview".

== See also ==
- List of unsolved murders (1900–1979)
