= Robert Brennan =

Robert Brennan may refer to:

- Bob Brennan (1941–2026), New Zealand–Korean priest and social activist
- Bobby Brennan (1925–2002), English professional footballer
- Bobby Brennan (soccer) (born 1979), American soccer defender
- Robbie Brennan (1947–2016), Irish drummer and a former member of the band Grand Slam
- Robert E. Brennan (born 1944), American businessman
- Robert Brennan (journalist) (1881–1964), Irish writer, diplomat and a founder of The Irish Press newspaper
- Robert J. Brennan (born 1962), American prelate of the Roman Catholic Church
