= Richard Brennan =

Richard Brennan may refer to:

- Richard Brennan (barrister), Irish lawyer and officer in the Irish Defence Forces
- Dick Brennan (journalist) (born 1969), American journalist
- Rich Brennan (born 1972), American ice hockey player
- Richard Brennan (biochemist), American biochemist
- Richard Brennan (filmmaker), producer of The Love Letters from Teralba Road
- Richard Brennan (restaurateur) (1931–2015), New Orleans restaurateur, operated the Commander's Palace
- Dick Brennan (hurler) (1885–1963), Irish hurler
