= Ian Brennan =

Ian Brennan may refer to:

- Ian Brennan (cricketer) (born 1930), New Zealand cricketer
- Ian Brennan (footballer) (born 1953), English former footballer
- Ian Brennan (music producer) (born 1966), American music producer
- Ian Brennan (sculptor) (born 1950), British sculptor
- Ian Brennan (writer) (born 1978), American television writer, actor, producer and director
