= Martin Brennan =

Martin Brennan may refer to:

- Martin Brennan (Irish politician) (1903–1967), Irish medical practitioner and Fianna Fáil politician, TD from 1938 to 1948
- Martin Brennan (engineer), computer engineer who worked for Sinclair Research and Atari
- Martin A. Brennan (1879–1941), U.S. Representative from Illinois
- Martin Brennan (hurler) (born 1946), Irish retired sportsman
- Martin Stanislaus Brennan (1845–1927), American Roman Catholic priest and scientist
- Martin Brennan (footballer) (born 1982), English footballer
- Martin Brennan (character), a fictional character created by the comedian Steve Coogan
