= Frank Brennan =

Frank Brennan is the name of:

- Frank Brennan (judge) (1884–1949), Queensland Labor MLA and Supreme Court judge
- Frank Brennan (politician) (1873–1950), Labor member of the Australian House of Representatives from 1911 to 1931 and 1934 to 1949
- Frank Brennan (footballer) (1924–1997), Scottish footballer who played for Newcastle United
- Frank Brennan (writer) (1936–1995), Australian romance novelist under the name "Emma Darcy"
- Frank Brennan (priest) (born 1954), Australian Jesuit priest, lawyer and academic
- Frank Brennan (karateka) (born 1960), British karate champion and instructor
- Frank Brennan (economist) (1947–2015), Irish economist

== See also ==
- Francis Brennan (disambiguation)
