= Philip Brennan =

Philip Brennan may refer to:

- Philip Brennan (Dublin hurler) (born 1983)
- Philip Brennan (Clare hurler) (born 1983)
- Philip Brennan (visual effects artist), see Academy Award for Best Visual Effects
