= Fanny Brennan =

French-American surrealist artist and painter

- Born: 1921; Paris, France
- Died: 2001 (aged 79–80); New York City
- Known for: Painting
- Movement: Surrealism

Fanny Myers Brennan (1921 – July 22, 2001) was a French-American surrealist artist and painter.

Brennan was born in Paris, educated in the United States and Europe and enrolled in an art school in France in 1938. When World War II began, Brennan went to New York. In 1941 the Wakefield Bookshop gallery run by Betty Parsons included her in two shows. She also worked for Harper's Bazaar and the Metropolitan Museum of Art. In 1944, the Office of War Information hired her to work in Europe. For almost twenty years after the birth of her children Brennan ceased painting, not beginning again until 1970. Starting in 1973, she had three solo exhibitions with Parsons, and then some with Coe Kerr Gallery. A book of her work, titled Skyshades: Sixty Small paintings, was published in 1990 with an introduction by Calvin Tomkins.

Brennan's paintings are typically in miniature format and frequently combine domestic objects such as buttons with landscapes. The art critic Celia McGee said of her paintings that "Brennan's magic‐realist canvases—in which landscapes are literally put in a nutshell, a feather duster is taken to Mount Fuji, a spool of ribbon unwinds into a road, and scale and gravity are turned on their heads—are never larger than six square inches."

Her portrait was drawn by Alberto Giacometti. She died on July 22, 2001, in New York City.
