= Bishop Brennan =

Bishop Brennan may refer to:

- Bishop Leonard Brennan, a fictional character in the TV series Father Ted; see List of Father Ted characters (Bishop Brennan)
  - "Kicking Bishop Brennan Up the Arse", an episode of the TV series Father Ted
- Denis Brennan (born 1945), Irish Roman Catholic Bishop of Ferns from 2006 until 2021
- Joseph Vincent Brennan (born 1954), American Roman Catholic Bishop of Fresno since 2019
- Mark E. Brennan (born 1947), American Roman Catholic Bishop of Wheeling-Charleston since 2019
- Robert J. Brennan (born 1962), American Roman Catholic Bishop of Brooklyn since 2021
- Thomas Francis Brennan, appointed (Roman Catholic) Bishop of Dallas in 1891 and later Auxiliary Bishop of St. John's, Newfoundland
