= Stephen Brennan =

Stephen Brennan is the name of:

- Stephen W. Brennan (1893–1968), American judge
- Steve Brennan (born 1951), Northern Irish darts player
- Steve Brennan (footballer, born 1958) (1958–2015), English footballer
- Steve Brennan (American reporter) (c. 1952–2009), Irish-born American reporter, journalist, and editor of The Hollywood Reporter
