= Síle Ní Bhraonáin =

Síle Ní Bhraonáin (born 1983), Irish television presenter, born Connemara.

Ní Bhraonain is a native of An Spidéal, Connemara and presenter of TG4's "Sile Show" since 2005. Her career at TG4 began about a year out of school with a phone call she received while she was doing a local FÁS computer course. She has hosted Gradam Ceoil awards.
