= James Brennan (footballer) =

Irish footballer

Personal information
- Full name: James Francis Brennan
- Date of birth: 10 September 1884
- Place of birth: Templemore, Ireland
- Date of death: 6 September 1917 (aged 32)
- Place of death: West Flanders, Belgium
- Height: 5 ft 9 in (1.75 m)
- Position: Inside right

Senior career*
Years	Team	Apps	(Gls)
- Valkyrie
1903–1904	Liverpool	0	(0)
1904–1907	Africa Royal		(32 (Note: Goals scored in the 1906–07 season.))
1907–1908	Bury	1	(0)
1908–1909	Brighton & Hove Albion	10	(1)
- * Club domestic league appearances and goals

James Francis Brennan (10 September 1884 – 6 September 1917) was an Irish professional footballer who made one appearance as an inside right in the Football League for Bury. He also played in the Southern League for Brighton & Hove Albion.

== Personal life ==
Brennan attended Prior Park College in Bath. He served in the King's Regiment (Liverpool) and the Lancashire Fusiliers during the First World War and was holding the rank of corporal when he was killed in action in West Flanders, Belgium on 6 September 1917. Brennan is commemorated on the Tyne Cot Memorial to the Missing.

== Honours ==
Africa Royal

- West Cheshire League: 1906–07
- Liverpool Shield: 1906–07
