= Jim Brennan (Northern Irish footballer) =

Northern Irish footballer

Personal information
- Full name: James Rory Brennan
- Date of birth: 29 February 1932
- Place of birth: Downpatrick, Northern Ireland
- Date of death: 24 January 2009 (aged 76)
- Place of death: Braintree, England
- Positions: Left winger; full back

Senior career*
Years	Team	Apps	(Gls)
- Glentoran
1952–1954	Birmingham City	0	(0)
1954–1956	Swindon Town	16	(1)
1956–1959	Chelmsford City		
1959–1960	Kidderminster Harriers		
- Randfontein
- * Club domestic league appearances and goals

James Rory Brennan (29 February 1932 — 24 January 2009) was a Northern Irish footballer who played as a left winger.

== Career ==
Brennan began his career in Northern Ireland, playing for Glentoran. In 1952, Brennan signed for Birmingham City, however failed to make an appearance during his time at the club. Two years later, Brennan signed for Swindon Town, making 16 Football League appearances, scoring once, during his time at the club.

In 1956, Brennan signed for Chelmsford City, making 53 appearances as a full-back, before being released in 1959. Following Brennan's release from Chelmsford, he signed for Kidderminster Harriers. In 1960, Brennan emigrated to South Africa, playing in the National Football League for Randfontein.
