= Jim Brennan (rugby union) =

Rugby union player from Northern Ireland

- Full name: James Irwin Brennan
- Born: 22 August 1934 Belfast, Northern Ireland
- Died: 7 August 2001 (aged 66) Swindon, England

Rugby union career
- Position: Prop
International career
Years	Team	Apps	(Points)
1957	Ireland	2	(0)

James Irwin Brennan (22 August 1934 — 29 August 2001) was an Irish international rugby union player.

Brennan was born in Belfast and educated at Belfast High School.

A teacher by profession, Brennan was a classics master at the Royal Belfast Academical Institution at the time of his Ireland caps in 1957, during his first season with CIYMS. He played much of his early rugby as a back rower but was selected by Ireland to replace Paddy O'Donoghue in the front row, for matches against Scotland at Murrayfield and Wales at Cardiff. Later that year, Brennan won a place on the Barbarians tour of Canada, but was unable to make the trip.

Brennan also played association football, captaining Dublin University.

== See also ==
- List of Ireland national rugby union players
