= John Brennan (doctor) =

Irish medical doctor

John Brennan was born at Ballahide, County Carlow, about 1768 and died in Dublin on 29 July 1830. The Compendium of Irish Biography (1878) says of him:

"He was educated to the medical profession, and obtained a wide reputation for his successful practice in puerperal disorders. An excellent classical scholar, a man of talent and humour, his sallies were long remembered. As editor of the Milesian Magazine he unhappily prostituted his talents, by ridiculing for pay the Catholic leaders of his day, and abusing the members of his own profession ... In Notes and Queries, 3rd Series, will be found reference to a copy of the Milesian Magazine in the British Museum, containing a MS. key to Brennan's pseudonyms."
