= Les Brennan (Australian rules footballer) =

Australian rules footballer, born 1910

Personal information
- Full name: Leslie Joseph Brennan
- Born: 2 October 1910; Richmond, Victoria
- Died: 29 July 1992 (aged 81)
- Original team: Regents Park

Playing career^{1}
Years	Club	Games (Goals)
1931	North Melbourne	11 (11)
- ^{1} Playing statistics correct to the end of 1931.

Leslie Joseph Brennan (2 October 1910 – 29 July 1992) was an Australian rules footballer who played with North Melbourne in the Victorian Football League (VFL).
