= Scott Brennan =

Scott Brennan may refer to:

- Scott Brennan (comedian), Australian actor and comedian
- Scott Brennan (rower) (born 1983), Australian Olympic rower
