= Peter Brennan =

Peter Brennan may refer to:

- Peter Brennan (bobsleigh) (born 1942), American Olympic bobsledder
- Peter Brennan (producer), American television producer
- Peter J. Brennan (1918–1996), United States Secretary of Labor under Presidents Nixon and Ford
- Peter Brennan (Newfoundland politician) (1786–1887), Irish-born political figure in Newfoundland
- Peter Paul Brennan (1941–2016), bishop of the Ecumenical Catholic Diocese of the Americas
- Pete Brennan (1936–2012), American basketball player
- Peter M. Brennan, American diplomat
