= Mark Brennan =

Mark Brennan may refer to:

- Mark Brennan (English footballer) (born 1965), English footballer
- Mark Brennan (Gaelic footballer) (born 1983/1984), Irish sportsman
- Mark E. Brennan (born 1947), American Roman Catholic bishop
- Mark Brennan (Neighbours), a fictional character from the Australian soap opera Neighbours
