= Ian Brennan (cricketer) =

New Zealand cricketer

Personal information
- Full name: Ian Nesbit Brennan
- Born: 17 July 1930 (age 96); Petone, New Zealand
- Batting: Left-handed
- Role: Batsman

Domestic team information
- Years: Team
- 1958/59: Wellington
- Source: Cricinfo, 23 October 2020

Ian Nesbit Brennan (born 17 July 1930) is a former New Zealand cricketer. He played in three first-class matches for Wellington in 1958–59.

A left-handed batsman, Brennan's highest first-class score was 40 in his last match, when he opened the batting and added 104 for the second wicket with Bob Vance in a Plunket Shield match against Otago. He played Hawke Cup cricket for Hutt Valley from 1948 to 1962 and was a member of the team that won the title in December 1948 and held it until April 1950.
