= Brennen =

Brennen is a given name and surname. Notable people with the name include:

- Brennen Beyer, (born 1992), American football player
- Brennen Carvalho (born 1985), American football player
- Brennen Jones (born 1987), Canadian curler
- David A. Brennen, American jurist and academic administrator
- Edward Brennen, British philanthropist who lived and died in India

== See also ==
- Brenen, a given name and surname
- Brennan (given name)
- Brennan (surname)
