= Tad Brennan =

American philosopher (born 1962)

- Born: 1962 (age 63–64)

Education
- Education: Reed College (BA); Princeton University (PhD)

Philosophical work
- Era: 21st-century philosophy
- Region: Western philosophy
- Institutions: Cornell University
- Main interests: ancient Greek philosophy

Tad Brennan (born 1962) is an American philosopher and Professor of Philosophy at Cornell University. He is known for his works on ancient Greek philosophy.

== Books ==
- The Stoic Life : Emotions, Duties, and Fate, Oxford University Press 2005
- Ethics and Epistemology in Sextus Empiricus, Garland Publications 1999
