= Don Brennan =

Don Brennan may refer to:

- Don Brennan (cricketer) (1920–1985), English cricketer
- Don Brennan (Coronation Street)
- Don Brennan (baseball) (1903–1953), pitcher in Major League Baseball
