= Úna Brennan =

Irish nationalist and feminist (1888–1958)

- Born: Anastasia Bolger; 1888; County Wexford, Ireland
- Died: 1958 (aged 69–70); Ireland

Úna Brennan (1888–1958) was an Irish republican and feminist, active during the Easter Rising of 1916 and both the War of Independence and Civil War.

== Early life ==
Born Anastasia Bolger in 1888 to John and Johanna (Whitty) Bolger, she was the eldest of six children in Coolnaboy, County Wexford. She was educated in the Loreto Convent in Enniscorthy, where she had to be a boarder living away from home.

In 1908 Brennan arranged to get a monthly column in The Echo newspaper edited by William Sears. She covered topics like Women's rights both in the home and in public life. She joined Inghinidhe na hÉireann and became the local Secretary, later she was a member of Cumann na mBan. She was also one of the first female members of the Irish Republican Brotherhood. As a supporter of the Irish Language Brennan initially changed her name to Anatás before changing it to Úna.

She married Robert Brennan on 6 July 1909. He was in the Gaelic League and Sinn Féin. He taught Irish in Wexford, Tagoat, and Castlebridge. He was a member of the Irish Republican Brotherhood and insisted they swear his wife in as well. He believed only two women were sworn in, his wife and Maud Gonne. According to Helena Molony she was a significant influence in the magazine Bean na hÉireann.

== Irish Wars ==
Despite having a six-year-old daughter at home she was with her husband in the Athenaeum in Enniscorthy, County Wexford during the Rising. She was one of three women who raised the Tricolour on the building on Thursday 27 April 1916 with Marion Stokes and Gretta Comerford. She then set up an emergency hospital and kitchen which she ran for the duration of the occupation. Brennan was arrested and taken to gaol in Waterford and later to Mountjoy Prison. However she was released after a few days.

After the Rising the family moved to Dublin. Brennan was active in the Irish War of Independence, using the home as a safe house for documents and men in hiding, such as Harry Boland and Colman O'Donovan. During the Irish Civil War they were on the Anti-Treaty side and continued to shelter men, documents and dispatches.

== Family and later life ==
She and her husband had three daughters, Emer, Maeve and Derry (Deirdre), as well as a son, Robert Patrick. Maeve Brennan became a well known writer.

The racehorse trainer Jim Bolger is her nephew and the writer Roddy Doyle is her great-nephew. Robert Brennan was involved in politics and was sent to the USA. However the couple returned to Ireland in 1947. They lived in Rathfarnham, Dublin once Robert Brennan was Director of Broadcasting at Radio Éireann. Úna Brennan died in 1958.
