= Jon Brennan =

Jerseyman rugby player (born 1981)

- Born: Jon Brennan; 19 May 1981 (age 45) Jersey
- Height: 189 cm (6 ft 2 in)
- Weight: 127 kg (280 lb)

Rugby union career
- Position: Prop
- Current team: Jersey Reds
Senior career
Years	Team	Apps	(Points)
2003–2015	Jersey Reds	200	

Jon Brennan (born 19 May 1981) is a former Jersey rugby player who played at prop for Jersey Reds for 12 seasons, with 200 appearances. As of 2013, he was the club's longest-serving player, playing in his tenth season, while also teaching at De La Salle College.

Brennan first joined the Jersey Reds in 2003, when they were playing in the London Division 3 South West. Over an eight-year period, the club was promoted five times. He was named man of the match in the 2011 play-off against Loughborough Students, when Jersey secured promotion to National League 1.

In May 2013, Brennan was named to the RFU Championship Dream XV as tight-head prop, recognised as "the cornerstone of an impressive forward effort" during the season. He was described as "An old-fashioned out-and-out scrummager who takes no prisoners in the set piece."

During the 2013/14 season, the club's first as a full-time professional side, Brennan was one of the few Jersey-born players, along with hooker David Felton, winger Ed Dawson, and back-rower James Voss.

Brennan ended his first team rugby career at the end of the 2014/15 season. In 2015, he returned to play his final first-team match against Guernsey RFC in the Siam Cup, which Jersey won for the seventh consecutive year.
