= William Brennan =

William Brennan may refer to:

- William Brennan (Australian politician) (1865–1937), member of the New South Wales Parliament
- William Brennan (baseball) (born 1963), American baseball pitcher
- William C. Brennan (1918–2000), New York politician and judge
- William J. Brennan Jr. (1906–1997), justice of the United States Supreme Court
- William John Brennan (1938–2013), Australian Roman Catholic bishop
- William Joseph Brennan (bishop) (1904–1975), Roman Catholic priest in Australia
- Will Brennan (born 1998), American baseball player
- Willis Brennan (1893–1950), American football player
- Willy Brennan (died 1804), Irish highwayman
- Bill Brennan (umpire) (1880–1933), Major League Baseball umpire and college football coach
- Bill Brennan (boxer) (1893–1924), American boxer
- Bill Brennan (activist) (born 1968), candidate for governor of New Jersey in 2017
- Bill Brennan (journalist), American sports journalist
- Bill Brennan (Nebraska politician) (1922–1979), member of the Nebraska Legislature
- Billy Brennan (1934–2020), British ice hockey player
