= Kevin Brennan =

Kevin Brennan may refer to:

- Kevin Brennan (actor) (1920–1998), British actor
- Kevin Brennan (comedian) (born 1960), American comedian and podcaster
- Kevin Brennan, Baron Brennan of Canton (born 1959), British politician
