= Edward T. Brennan =

American politician (1927–2015)

Member of the Georgia House of Representatives
- In office 1957–1960

Personal details
- Born: June 3, 1927 Chatham County, Georgia, U.S.
- Died: August 14, 2015 (aged 88)
- Party: Democratic
- Education: Georgetown University; University of Virginia Law School

Edward T. Brennan (June 3, 1927 – August 14, 2015) was an American politician. He served as a Democratic member of the Georgia House of Representatives.

== Life and career ==
Brennan was born in Chatham County, Georgia. He served in the United States Navy during World War II. He attended Georgetown University and the University of Virginia Law School.

Brennan served in the Georgia House of Representatives from 1957 to 1960.

Brennan died on August 14, 2015 at his home, at the age of 88.
