= John Brennan (Kerry Gaelic footballer) =

Irish Gaelic footballer

Sport
- Sport: Gaelic football
- Position: Forward
Club
- Years: Club
- 1990's-2000's: Castleisland Desmonds
Inter-county
Years	County	Apps (scores)
1997-1998	Kerry	1 (0-00)
Inter-county titles
- All-Irelands: 1

John Brennan is a former Gaelic footballer who played with Castleisland Desmonds and Kerry. He won an All Ireland Under 21 title in 1996. He played one championship game in the first round of the 1997 championship.
