= Matt Brennan (footballer) =

Scottish footballer

Personal information
- Full name: Matthew Hyland Brennan
- Date of birth: 3 January 1943 (age 83)
- Place of birth: Glasgow, Scotland
- Position: Inside forward

Senior career*
Years	Team	Apps	(Gls)
- St Roch's
1962–1963	Luton Town	4	(1)
1963–1967	Chelmsford City	63	(8)
1967–1968	Cambridge City		
- Bury Town
- * Club domestic league appearances and goals

Matthew Hyland Brennan (born 3 January 1943) is a Scottish former footballer who played as an inside forward.

== Career ==
Brennan began his career at local Glaswegian club St Roch's, before joining Luton Town. Brennan played four times for Luton, scoring once, in the 1962–1963 Second Division, as Luton finished bottom. After departing Luton, Brennan signed for non-league club Chelmsford City, making 100 appearances in all competitions, scoring 13 times, across four seasons for the club. In 1967, Brennan signed for Cambridge City, later joining Bury Town after a single season at Cambridge.
