= Richard Brennan (barrister) =

Irish barrister

- Born: Ireland
- Military career
- Allegiance: Ireland
- Branch: Legal Service
- Service years: 1991–present
- Rank: Colonel
- Commands: National Legal Advisor to the Irish Contingent (UNIFIL) 2017; National Legal Advisor (UNDOF) 2012; Senior Legal Advisor to Commander of Multi-National Task Force (KFOR) 2008

Col. Richard Brennan is a Barrister-at-Law in the Legal Service of the Irish Defence Forces (DF) and former National Legal Advisor to the Defence Forces during United Nations peacekeeping operations as a United Nations Military Observer. He is a legal scholar on international humanitarian law and the legal basis of peacekeeping missions.

== Military career ==
Brennan was commissioned as an officer in the Irish Defence Forces in 1991. He first deployed as an infantry officer on two tours in Lebanon with the United Nations Interim Force in Lebanon (UNIFIL) in 1995 and 2000. In 2002, he deployed to Eritrea with the Irish Defence Forces supporting the United Nations Mission in Ethiopia and Eritrea (UNMEE).

Following extensive infantry service, Brennan was appointed as a legal officer in the Defence Forces in 2004. Between 2004 and 2009, he served as a staff officer within the office of Legal Service at the Defence Forces headquarters and held the rank of Commandant.

=== KFOR ===
In 2008, Brennan acted as the National Legal Advisor to Brigadier General Gerry Hegarty (Ret.), the Commander of the Multinational Task Force Centre (MNTF-C) for the NATO-led Kosovo Force (KFOR), during Ireland’s framework nation role in its "lead nation period" with KFOR.

=== UNDOF ===
In 2012, Brennan was appointed the National Legal Advisor to the Irish Contingent of the United Nations Disengagement Observer Force (UNDOF) in Golan. He subsequently advised on Ireland’s on deployments in Chad and Liberia.

=== UNIFIL ===
In 2017, Brennan served as the National Legal Advisor to the Irish Contingent of the UNIFIL.

== Legal career ==
Brennan is an expert on international humanitarian law, the protection of civilians and victims of armed conflict, and the legal basis of peacekeeping operations and their contemporary challenges. Brennan has also lectured on the protection of civilians during peace operations and the legal nexus in peace operations. He has advocated for continued relevance and importance of international humanitarian law, even with the genesis of new terrorist groups and the ever evolving nature of conflict. He has also raised the question of the interface between human rights law and international humanitarian law, advocating for assurance that there is a clear distinction in the dichotomy between human rights obligations and law of armed conflict (LOAC) obligations. With Ireland’s traditional role in peace support operations and peacekeeping operations, a lack of clarity can prevent appropriate dissemination of the law, which in turn affects the consistency of its operational application on the ground.

Brennan spoke on general data protection regulation (GDPR) and its potential to drive major cultural changes at the Data Protection Conference in Dublin in 2018.

Brennan is a member of the Board of Directors of the International Society for Military Law and the Law of War and represented the Office of the Director of Military Prosecutions, Defense Forces (Ireland) at the International Association of Prosecutors European Regional Conferences at The Hague. He is also a Trustee of the CAFNBO Distress Fund, set up for the purpose of reliving distress among serving NCO’s.

Brennan is currently an appointed prosecutor with the Director of Military Prosecutions and serves as Brigade Legal Advisor at two Brigade Headquarters.

== Education ==
Brennan holds a BA in History and Legal Science from UCG and graduated from NUI Galway with an LL.B. in 1999. He studied at the King's Inns in Dublin and was called to the Irish Bar in 2004 as a Barrister-at-Law. Brennan completed a Master's Degree (MA) in Leadership, Management and Defence Studies (LMDS) at NUI Maynooth in 2007.

Brennan is a graduate of the Command and Staff School at the Military College of the Irish Defence Forces Training Centre. His dissertation for the 63rd Command and Staff Course on "Targeting in the modern Battle-Space" was awarded the "Gradam Taighde Na bhForsai Cosanta," The Defence Forces Award for Excellence for thesis research for best thesis. He is a graduate of the International Institute of Humanitarian Law in San Remo, Italy, and has also completed operational law courses at the NATO Operational Law School in Oberammagau, Germany and the United Kingdom at the Operational Law Centre Warminster. He completed the Advanced Laws of War course at the University of Liverpool under Dominic McGoldrick.

Brennan has instructed as class leader at the International Institute of Humanitarian Law and at the NATO/PfP School in Ankara, Turkey.
