= Tom Brennan (footballer) =

English footballer

Personal information
- Full name: Thomas Brennan
- Place of birth: Goldenhill, England
- Position: Inside forward

Youth career
- Cobridge

Senior career*
Years	Team	Apps	(Gls)
1916–1919	Port Vale	0	(0)
1919–1920	Stockport County	1	(0)
1920–192?	Stafford Rangers		
- * Club domestic league appearances and goals

Thomas Brennan was an English footballer who played as an inside forward for Port Vale, Stockport County, and Stafford Rangers.

== Career ==
Brennan joined Port Vale from Cobridge in August 1916. He made his debut at inside-right in a 1–0 defeat to Preston North End in a Football League, Lancashire Regional Section match at Deepdale on 5 January 1918. He was conscripted into the Army but continued to play for Port Vale when he was in Staffordshire. He left the club in May 1919 and went on to play for Stockport County and Stafford Rangers.

== Career statistics ==
Appearances and goals by club, season and competition
Club	Season	League			FA Cup		Total	
Club	Season	Division	Apps	Goals	Apps	Goals	Apps	Goals
Stockport County	1919–20	Second Division	1	0	0	0	1	0
