= Bert Brenen =

English footballer (1915–1995)

Personal information
- Full name: Albert Brenen
- Date of birth: 5 October 1915
- Place of birth: South Shields, England
- Date of death: February 1995 (age 79)
- Place of death: York, England
- Position: Wing half

Senior career*
Years	Team	Apps	(Gls)
	St. John's College	?	(?)
1938–1950	York City	204	(13)
	Scarborough	?	(?)
- * Club domestic league appearances and goals

Albert Brenen (5 October 1915 in South Shields, England – February 1995) was an English footballer.

Brenen joined York City from St. John's College in 1938.
