= Margaret Brennan (disambiguation) =

Margaret Brennan (born 1980) is an American news correspondent.

Margaret or Maggie Brennan may also refer to:

== Real people ==
- Margaret Brennan (nun) (1831–1887), Canadian Roman Catholic nun
- Margaret Brennan (Gaelic football), see Ladies' Gaelic football All Stars Awards
- Maggie Brennan (actress) in Randall's Thumb
- Maggie Brennan, WCBE radio host

== Fictional characters ==
- Margaret Brennan, character in The Marriage of Bette and Boo created by Victoria Clark
- Margaret "Maggie" Brennan, character in Death (DC Comics)
