= John N. H. Brennan =

Irish author and solicitor

John Needham Huggard Brennan (1914–2010) was an Irish author, hunter, and solicitor. He published under the name John Welcome. He adopted the pen name due to the then-strict laws concerning advertising by solicitors.
