= Maeve Brennan =

Irish writer (1917–1993)

Maeve Brennan (6 January 1917 – 1 November 1993) was an Irish short story writer and journalist. She moved to the United States in 1934 when her father was assigned by the Department of Foreign Affairs to the Irish Legation in Washington, D.C. She was an important figure in both Irish diaspora writing and in Irish literature itself. Collections of her articles, short stories, and a novella have been published.

== Early life ==
She was born in Dublin, one of four siblings, and grew up at 48 Cherryfield Avenue in the Dublin suburb of Ranelagh. She and her sisters were each named after ancient Irish Queens: Emer, Deirdre and Maeve. Her parents, Robert and Úna Brennan, both from County Wexford, were Republicans and were deeply involved in the Irish political and cultural struggles of the early twentieth century. They participated in the 1916 Easter Rising but while Úna was imprisoned for a few days, Robert was sentenced to death. The sentence was commuted to penal servitude.

His continuing political activity resulted in further imprisonments in 1917 and 1920. Maeve was born while he was in prison. He was director of publicity for the anti-Treaty Irish Republican Army during the Irish Civil War. He also founded and was the director of The Irish Press newspaper.

His imprisonments and activities greatly fragmented Maeve Brennan's childhood. In her story The Day We Got Our Own Back she recounts her memory of how, when she was five, her home was raided by Free State forces looking for her father, who was on the run.

Robert Brennan was appointed the Irish Free State's first minister to the United States, and the family moved to Washington, D.C. in 1934, when Maeve was seventeen. She attended the Sisters of Providence Catholic school in Washington, Immaculata Seminary, graduating in 1936. She then graduated with a degree in English from American University in 1938. Maeve and her two sisters remained in the United States when her parents and brother returned to Ireland in 1944.

== Career ==
Brennan moved to New York and found work as a fashion copywriter at Harper's Bazaar in the 1940s. She also wrote a Manhattan column for the Dublin society magazine Social and Personal, and wrote several short pieces for The New Yorker magazine. In 1949, she was offered a staff job by William Shawn, The New Yorker's managing editor.

Brennan first wrote for The New Yorker as a social diarist. She wrote sketches about New York life in The Talk of the Town section under the pseudonym "The Long-Winded Lady". She also contributed fiction criticism, fashion notes, and essays. She wrote about both Ireland and the United States.

In 1950, Harper's Bazaar published Brannan's story "The Holy Terror", followed by "The poor men and women" in April 1952. Later in 1952, William Maxwell published all of her further stories of Dublin in The New Yorker.

Brennan's work was fostered by Maxwell, and she wrote under The New Yorker managing editors Harold Ross and William Shawn. Although she was widely read in the United States in the 1950s and 1960s, she was almost unknown in Ireland, even though Dublin was the setting of many of her short stories.

A compendium of her New Yorker articles called The Long-Winded Lady: Notes from the New Yorker was published in 1969. Two collections of short stories, In and Out of Never-Never Land (Scribner, 1969) and Christmas Eve (1974) were also published.

== Personal life ==
The love of her life was reportedly writer and theatre critic/director Walter Kerr but he broke off their engagement and married writer Bridget Jean Collins.

In 1954, Brennan married St. Clair McKelway, The New Yorker's managing editor. McKelway had a history of alcoholism, womanizing and manic depression and had already been divorced four times. Brennan and McKelway divorced after five years.

Edward Albee greatly admired Brennan and compared her to Chekhov and Flaubert. One of the characters in his play Quotations from Chairman Mao Tse-Tung is called "Long-Winded Lady". He dedicated the published editions of Quotations from Chairman Mao Tse-Tung (1968) and Box (1968) to her.

Brennan was writing consistently and productively in the late 1960s. By the time her first books were published, however, she was showing signs of mental illness. Her previously immaculate appearance became unkempt. Her friends began to find her eccentricities disturbing rather than entertaining. She became obsessive.

In the 1970s Brennan became paranoid and alcoholic. Hospitalized on numerous occasions, she became destitute and homeless, frequently sleeping in the women's lavatory or broom cupboard at the offices of The New Yorker, at one point tending a wounded pigeon. She was last seen at the magazine's offices in 1981.

In the 1980s, Brennan vanished from view and her work was forgotten. After wandering from one transient hotel to another along 42nd Street, she was admitted to Lawrence Nursing Home in Arverne.

== Death ==
She died of a heart attack on 1 November 1993, aged 76, and is buried in Queens, New York City.

== Works ==
Brennan's writing in her "Long-Winded Lady" pieces and in her short stories are quite different both in style and content.

=== The New Yorker articles ===
Brennan's contributions as "The Long-Winded Lady" in The New Yorker are sardonic observations of New York life. In them, Brennan mocks Manhattan society and social tradition, but in a humorous, wistful, and often melancholy manner. In these stories she is an observer eavesdropping on strangers' conversations in bars, diners, hotel lobbies, and streets in places like Times Square and Greenwich Village. She then embellishes her observations with speculations and autobiographical details. Brennan is always an onlooker in these sketches, never a participant. For example, she watches a street protest against the Vietnam War from a window, but does not venture out onto the street. A compendium of her articles was published in 1969.

=== Short stories ===
Brennan writes with a minimum of characters and plot. Some of her stories are quietly tender and poignant while others are satirical. The characters are emotionally unreachable and often lead stagnant lives where everything remains much the same. She often repeats characters from story to story, for example, Hubert and Rose Derdon, whose marriage is examined over stories set years apart. In the final Derdon story, "The Drowned Man", Rose has died and Hubert has to pretend that he is overwhelmed with grief for his dead wife, "... she was gone, she had been good, and he wished he could miss her."

The main themes in Brennan's short stories are feelings of loneliness, vulnerability, despair, spite, and fear. Another theme is the individual's need for expression being countered and restricted by the need for societal acceptance in a country that clung to traditions steeped in the church and strict convention. For example, in "The Devil In Us", she describes a convent school that seeks to destroy nonconformity.

Brennan also wrote stories set in or around Manhattan, which she described as "the capsized city—half-capsized, anyway, with the inhabitants hanging on, most of them still able to laugh as they cling to the island that is their life's predicament." These stories tend to be more satiric in tone, and she often parodies middle-class pretensions.

Brennan's stories about her cats, dog and Long Island beach cottage show her mistrust of human nature and love of solitude and innocence.

Two collections of Brennan's short stories were published in her lifetime: In and Out of Never-Never Land was published in 1969, and Christmas Eve was published in 1974. These collections were well received in the United States, but there were no paperback editions. None of her books was published in Ireland or the UK.

=== Novella ===
Brennan wrote a novella, The Visitor, in the 1940s, but it was not published until 2000, after the only known copy of the manuscript was discovered in the archives of the University of Notre Dame.

The Visitor is about the destructive power of family pride and anger. In it, a 22-year-old woman called Anastasia King returns to Dublin to live with her grandmother after her parents die. Anastasia's mother had left her husband and his judgemental, domineering mother and had moved to Paris. Her grandmother is angry with Anastasia for choosing to live with her mother rather than her father. Desperate to stay in her childhood home, Anastasia tries to break through the wall of loneliness and isolation that surrounds her grandmother, but, as her efforts fail, loneliness threatens to envelop her in a detachment as cruel as that of her grandmother.

== Posthumous publications and commemoration ==
The front cover of Maeve Brennan's biography

Brennan's writing was largely forgotten in the 1980s. In 1987, Mary Hawthorne, who was then on the staff of The New Yorker, grew interested in Brennan after seeing an older woman, dishevelled and dressed eccentrically, staring at the floor in the vestibule of the offices one day. She learned that the woman was Maeve Brennan, no longer allowed inside, and from Hilton Als that Brennan had been a cult figure to many younger writers on the staff. She began asking around about her, interviewing colleagues, among them William Keepers Maxwell Jr., Alastair Reid, Brendan Gill, and Gardner Botsford; family members; and Karl Bissinger, who had photographed her in her glamorous youth. Hawthorne's essay, "A Traveller in Residence," appeared in the London Review of Books. The same year, Christopher Carduff, an editor at Houghton Mifflin, published both a new, larger, collection of Brennan's "Long-Winded Lady" pieces and The Springs of Affection, a volume of her short stories. William Maxwell provided the introduction for The Springs of Affection.

The discovery and publication of The Visitor also helped to revive interest in Brennan. She was also mentioned in Roddy Doyle's book Rory and Ita as a cousin of his mother who stayed with his family and wrote book reviews for The New Yorker in the garden.

In 2004, Angela Bourke's biography Maeve Brennan: Homesick at the New Yorker was published. In it, Bourke speculates that Brennan may have been the inspiration for the character Holly Golightly in Truman Capote's novella Breakfast at Tiffany's (1958). The two had worked together at both Harper's Bazaar and The New Yorker.

In September 2013 Eamon Morrissey wrote and performed the play "Maeve's House" at the Abbey Theatre in Dublin. Many of Brennan's stories were set in her childhood home at 48 Cherryfield Avenue, Ranelagh, Dublin. Morrissey later lived in this house and he eventually met Brennan in New York. The play is about the writer, her work, the house, and their fleeting meeting. It is a one-man show.

In 2016, the Irish literary magazine and publisher The Stinging Fly republished The Springs of Affection with an introduction by Anne Enright. This was followed in January 2017 by The Long-Winded Lady, with a new introduction by Belinda McKeon.

In 2021 Brennan was included in the anthology "All Strangers Here", a collection of writing by authors who lived in Department of Foreign Affairs and Trade missions abroad (either as diplomats or their family members).

On 6 January 2024, a commemorative plaque was unveiled to honour Maeve Brennan at 48 Cherryfield Avenue, Ranelagh, Dublin, her "memory palace", where she lived from 1921, aged four until her family moved to America in 1934.

On 25 January 2024, The Long-Winded Lady, a collection of Brennan’s New Yorker columns, written from the 1950s to early 1980s, was republished, with an introduction by Sinéad Gleeson.

== Bibliography ==
=== Fiction ===
- In and Out of Never-Never Land (1969)
- Christmas Eve (1974)
- The Springs of Affection: Stories of Dublin (1997)
- The Rose Garden: Short Stories (2000)
- The Visitor (2000)

=== Non fiction ===
- The Long-Winded Lady: Notes from the New Yorker (1969)
- The Long-Winded Lady: Notes from the New Yorker (1998)
