= Patrick Brennan =

Patrick Brennan may refer to:

- P. J. Brennan (born 1986), American actor
- Pádraig Brennan (born 1978), Irish Gaelic football player
- Patrick Brennan (police officer), Irish politician, TD 1921–1923, Assistant Commissioner of the Garda Síochána
- Paudge Brennan (Patrick Brennan, 1922–1998), Irish Fianna Fáil TD and Senator
- Patrick Brennan (lacrosse) (1877–1961), who represented Canada at the 1908 Summer Olympics
- Paddy Brennan (born c. 1930), Irish comics artist
- Paddy Brennan (jockey) (born 1981), Irish jockey
- Patrick Brennan (politician) (born 1953), Republican politician in the Vermont House of Representatives
- Patrick Brennan (actor) (born 1974), American actor
- Patrick Thomas Brennan (1901–1950), American Catholic missionary priest
