= Andrew Brennan =

Andrew Brennan may refer to:

- Andy Brennan, a fictional deputy for the Twin Peaks sheriff's department
- Andy Brennan (born 1993), Australian professional footballer
- Andrew Brennan (bishop) (1877–1956), American prelate of the Catholic Church
