= Robert Brennan (journalist) =

Irish writer (1881–1964)

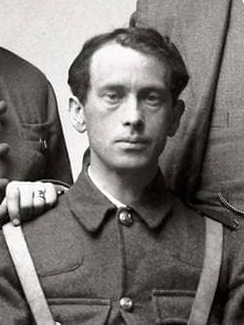
- Brennan in 1916

Irish Free State's Minister to the United States
- In office 1934–1947
- Preceded by: New office
- Succeeded by: Seán Nunan

Personal details
- Born: 22 July 1881 Wexford, Ireland
- Died: 13 November 1964 (aged 83) Dublin, Ireland
- Party: Sinn Féin
- Spouse: Úna Brennan
- Children: 4, including Maeve Brennan
- Occupation: Writer, diplomat, politician

Robert Brennan (22 July 1881 – 13 November 1964) was an Irish writer, diplomat and a founder of The Irish Press newspaper. He took part in the 1916 Easter Rising and later became the Irish Free State's first minister to the United States. He was the father of Irish-American author and New Yorker columnist Maeve Brennan.

== Life ==
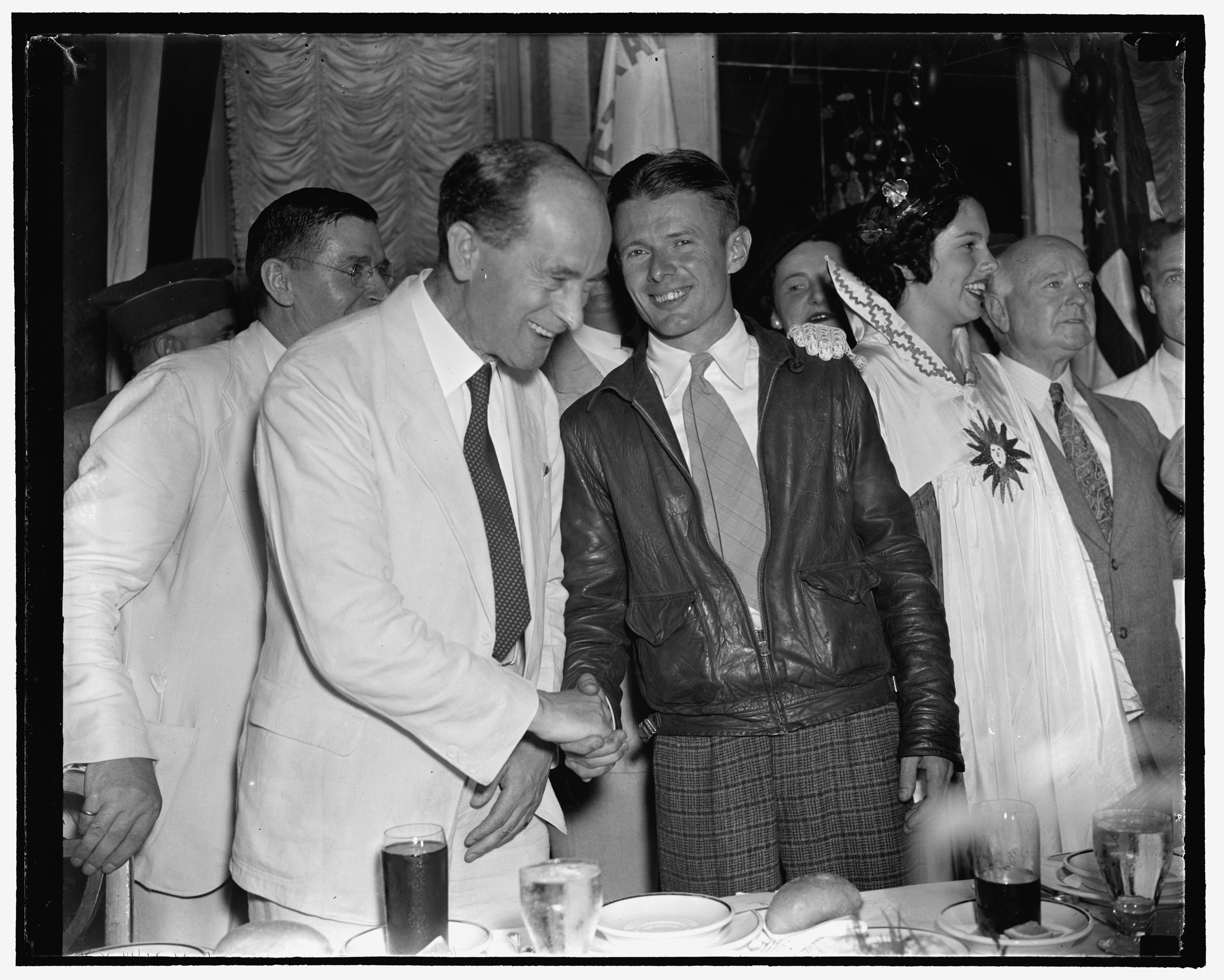
Brennan (left) in 1934.

Brennan was born at John's Gate Street, Wexford, the son of Robert Brennan, a victualler, and Bridget Kearney. He was a member of the staff of the Enniscorthy Echo. He joined the Gaelic League and the Irish Volunteers and was recruited into the IRB by Seán T. O'Kelly. He married Úna Brennan who was also active in the republican movement and had her sworn into the IRB. She was with him in Wexford for the 1916 Easter Rising.

He commanded the insurgents in Wexford during the 1916 Easter Rising, with approximately 600 men in the town of Enniscorthy. With Commandant Peter Paul Galligan operating in the surrounding rural areas, almost all of north Wexford was in rebel hands. Brennan along with other leaders Seamus Rafter and Seán Etchingham, was sentenced to death. Imprisoned in HM Prison Dartmoor, his sentence was commuted to penal servitude, he was later sent to Lewes Jail in Sussex and Parkhurst Prison on the Isle of Wight. His continuing political activity resulted in further imprisonments in 1917 and afterwards. His daughter Maeve Brennan was born while he was in prison. In April 1918 he was placed in charge of a newly formed Sinn Féin Department of Propaganda/Publicity. However, in November 1918 he was arrested in the run-up to the General Election (held in December), in an effort by the British Government to stifle the Sinn Féin election campaign. The election manifesto on which he had worked was "mutilated by the censor" - only about one half of it could be published. He became Sinn Féín National Director of Elections in December 1918. The election turned out to be a resounding success for the party.

Brennan wrote for and edited the Irish Bulletin from 1919-1922. The Irish Bulletin published information on raids by the security forces, weekly lists of atrocities taking place in Ireland and the arrests of Irish Republican suspects. The paper was delivered to all of the Dublin newspapers and to the foreign correspondents in Dublin and mailed to hundreds of addresses outside of Ireland. Brennan claimed that the Bulletin was so successful its (unsuccessful) suppression became a major objective of the British Military Government.

In January 1921 Éamon de Valera asked Brennan to assume the role of Under-Secretary of Foreign Affairs, Dáil Éireann, from February 1921 to January 1922. He helped organise the Irish Race Convention in Paris in 1922. He was director of publicity for the anti-Treaty Irish Republican Army during the Irish Civil War. He was a founder and a director, in 1934, of The Irish Press newspaper.

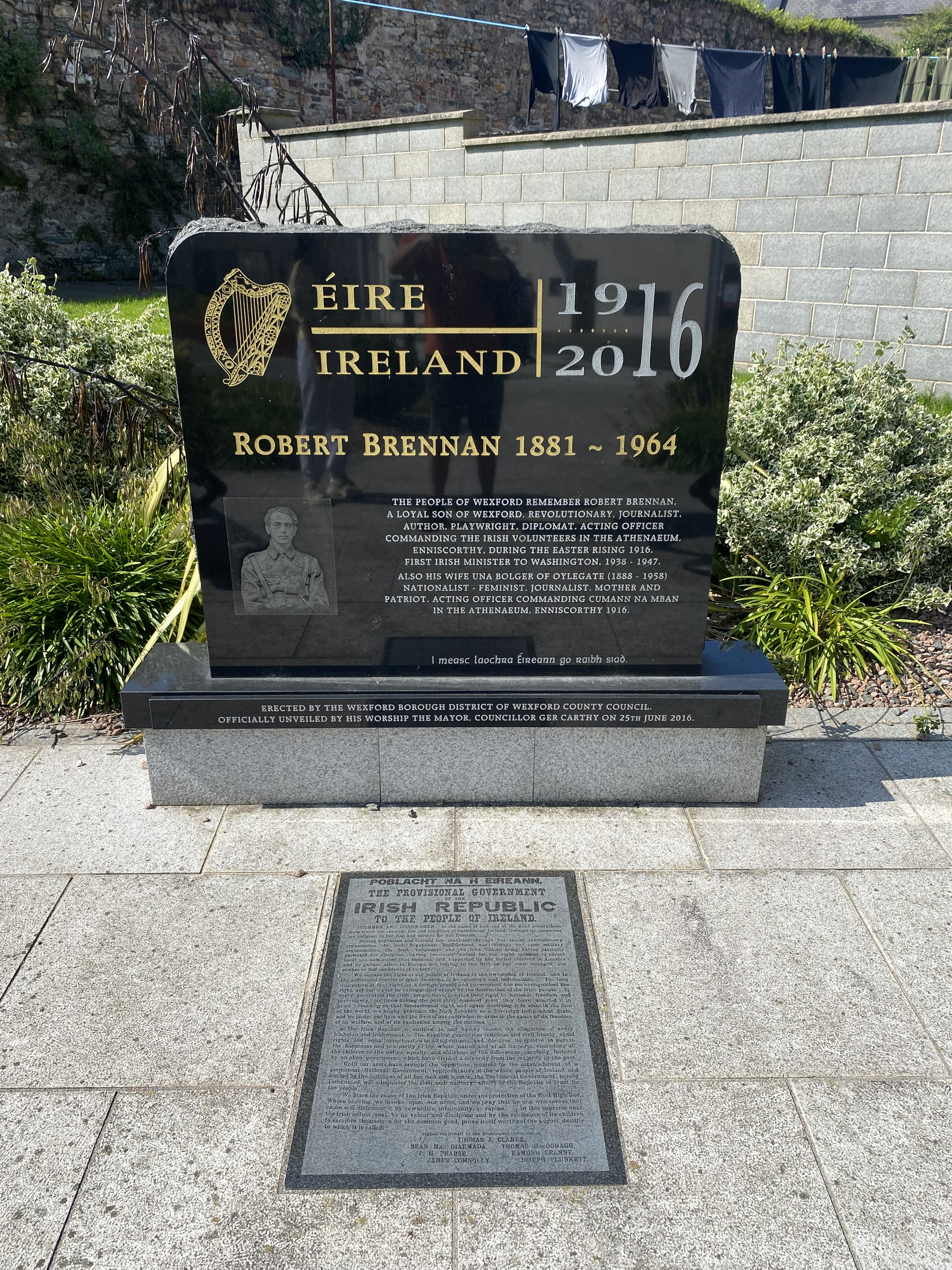
Memorial to Brennan in Wexford.

His imprisonments (in at least seven different prisons) and activities greatly fragmented his daughter Maeve's childhood. In her story The Day We Got Our Own Back she recounts her memory of how, when she was five, her home was raided by Free State forces looking for her father, who was on the run. Robert Brennan describes the same incident in his memoir Allegiance (pg. 268).

Robert Brennan was appointed the Irish Free State's first minister to the United States, and the family moved to Washington, D.C. in 1934. He was Minister Plenipotentiary to the US from 1938 to 1947. Robert, his wife, and one of his sons returned to Ireland (his three daughters remained in the United States) when he was appointed Director of Radio Éireann (1947–1948).

He wrote mystery stories as a hobby. He died in Dublin in 1964.

In 2016, Brennan was honored with a monument in Wexford.

== Works ==
=== Books ===
- The False Fingertip (1921) under the pseudonym Selskar Kearney
- The Toledo Dagger (1927), a detective novel
- The Man Who Walked like a Dancer
- Allegiance (1950) (autobiography)
- Ireland Standing Firm: My Wartime Mission in Washington and Eamon De Valera - A Memoir. Dublin: University College Dublin Press. 2002. ISBN 1-900621-68-1.

=== Plays ===
- Good Night, Mr. O’Donnell (1951)
