= John Carrig =

American businessman (born 1952)

- Education: Rutgers University (B.A.), Temple University (J.D.)
- Occupation: Businessperson
- Title: Chief operating officer and president (2008–2011)

John A. Carrig served as the chief operating officer and president for ConocoPhillips. In 2010, he announced his intention to retire from the company effective February 2011. He had been with ConocoPhillips since 1978 when he was hired as a tax attorney. He had previously been chief financial officer and executive vice president of finance since the merger of Conoco and Phillips Petroleum in 2002. Before then, he had been CFO at Phillips since 2001. He graduated from Rutgers University in 1974, received a Juris Doctor degree from Temple University in 1977, and an advanced degree in tax law from the New York University School of Law in 1978.
