= Joseph Brennan =

Joseph Brennan may refer to:

== Politicians ==
- Joseph Brennan (senator) (died 1950), Irish senator
- Joseph Brennan (Clann na Poblachta politician) (1889–1968), Irish TD 1948–1951
- Joseph Brennan (Fianna Fáil politician) (1912–1980), Irish government minister and Ceann Comhairle
- Joseph E. Brennan (1934–2024), U.S. politician, former Governor of Maine
- Joseph F. Brennan (born 1964), Pennsylvania politician

== Others ==
- Joseph Brenan or Brennan (1828–1857), writer and Young Irelander
- Joseph Charles Brennan (1836–1872), English recipient of the Victoria Cross
- Joseph Brennan (civil servant) (1887–1976), Irish civil servant
- Joseph Brennan (basketball) (1900–1989), American basketball player
- Joseph Brennan (author) (born 1986), Australian author
- Joseph Payne Brennan (1918–1990), American writer and poet
- Joseph Vincent Brennan (born 1954), Bishop, Catholic Diocese of Fresno
- Joe Brennan (hurler) (born 1990), Irish hurler
- Joe Brennan (rugby league) (1908–1949), Australian rugby league footballer

== See also ==
- John Joseph Brennan (1913–1976), Irish politician
