= Rowan Brennan =

PNG rugby league footballer

Personal information
- Full name: Rowan Michael Brennan
- Born: 13 April 1958 (age 66); Port Moresby, Papua New Guinea

Playing information
- Position: Fullback, Prop, Second-row, Lock
Club
| Years | Team | Pld | T | G | FG | P |
|---|---|---|---|---|---|---|
| 1982–83 | Canberra Raiders | 15 | 1 | 0 | 0 | 3 |
| 1986–87 | Wakefield Trinity | 15 | 1 | 0 | 0 | 4 |
| 1985–87 | Canberra Raiders | 31 | 2 | 0 | 0 | 8 |
| | Total | 61 | 4 | 0 | 0 | 15 |
- As of 19 May 2012

Rowan Michael Brennan (born 13 April 1958), also known by the nickname of "Animal", is a Papua New Guinean professional rugby league footballer who played in the 1980s. He played at club level for the Canberra Raiders (two spells), and Wakefield Trinity, as a fullback, prop, second-row, or lock.

== Background ==
Rowan Brennan was born in Port Moresby, Papua New Guinea.
