= Brennan Award =

Brennan Award may refer to:

- Christopher Brennan Award, Australian poetry award.
- Michael Brennan Award, financial economics award.
- William J. Brennan Award, public interest and free expression awards.
