= John O'Brennan =

Irish political scientist

John O'Brennan is an Irish political scientist. He is a professor of European Politics at the Department of Sociology at Maynooth University in Ireland. He holds the Jean Monnet Chair in European Integration at Maynooth University and is director of the Maynooth University Centre for European and Eurasian Studies. From 2020 to 2023, the centre was a designated Jean Monnet Centre of Excellence, with a focus on governance in South-eastern Europe, including EU enlargement issues, rule of law and EU relations with the Western Balkans and Ukraine. O'Brennan is a specialist in EU enlargement policy and also publishes on Ireland's relationship with the European Union (EU).

== Education and career ==
O'Brennan graduated from the University of Limerick (UL) in 1997 and subsequently completed a PhD at UL in Political Science. From 2000 to 2001, he was a lecturer in European and international politics at Varna University of Economics. He was also a visiting researcher at the European Union Institute for Security Studies in Paris in 2005. From 2001 to 2007, O'Brennan worked as a lecturer in European Union Politics at the University of Limerick. In 2007, he was appointed as lecturer in European Politics and Society at Maynooth University.

== Brexit, Ireland and the EU ==
O'Brennan is an authority on Brexit and was a member of the Brexit Stakeholder Group, which was convened by the Irish Minister for Foreign Affairs in September 2017. He contributed to several radio and television discussions of Brexit after 2016. His research centre at Maynooth, the Centre for European and Eurasian Studies, hosted a number of public events on Brexit, including an interview with commentator Fintan O'Toole of The Irish Times and discussions at different stages of the Brexit negotiations.

In 2021, O'Brennan hosted former BBC Newsnight anchor Gavin Esler in a discussion of his book, How Britain Ends - English Nationalism and the Re-birth of Four Nations, with responses to Esler's book from Professor Brigid Laffan (European University Institute) and Professor Colin Coulter (Maynooth University). O'Brennan was interviewed as part of a project devoted to explaining Brexit to school-goers in Ireland.

He has lectured on the European Union, and in 2019 he undertook a lecture tour on Brexit which took in the University of Ljubljana (Slovenia), Rijeka University (Croatia), and the University of Trieste (Italy). He also delivered a lecture on Ireland and Brexit at the Institute of European Studies at the University of California at Berkeley in May 2019. In 2022-23, he delivered a series of lectures examining Ireland’s experience of 50 years of EU membership at Dublin City University’s EU Academy conference, the University of Bucharest, and the University of Georgia.

O’Brennan is perceived as a champion of European integration but has also been critical of the EU. For example, he has criticised the EU's approach to rule of law violations within the EU and the failures in EU policy towards the Western Balkan states.

He was a participant in a conference, titled "Ireland and the EU at 50", which was hosted by the Irish Department of Foreign Affairs in Dublin on 27 October 2022. O'Brennan has also contributed to the McGill Summer School and events run by the Royal Irish Academy. Internationally, he has spoken at the Goethe Institute in Nicosia in Cyprus, and has lectured at Glasgow University, Reykjavik University, Leicester University, Leiden University and Marburg University.

O'Brennan was a critic of the Trump administration and did a number of radio and television shows criticising the community in Doonbeg, County Clare, (where the Trump organisation owns a golf course) for welcoming the Trump family. There was subsequent criticism of O'Brennan within the Doonbeg community.

=== EU treaty debates ===
O'Brennan was involved in the debates surrounding ratification of the Nice and Lisbon treaties in Ireland (2001-2002 and 2008-2009), as well as the 2012 Fiscal Treaty, contributing opinion pieces, journal articles and think tank policy papers to these discussions.

== Affiliations ==
O'Brennan is a member and participant in events hosted by the University Association for Contemporary European Studies (UACES), the European Union Studies Association (EUSA), and the American Conference for Irish Studies (ACIS). He is vice-president of the Irish Association for Contemporary European Studies (IACES), and was formerly secretary and a board member of the Political Studies Association of Ireland (PSAI).

On several occasions, O'Brennan has been a witness before parliamentary committees on issues connected to Brexit, European integration and international relations. On 7 December 2022 he testified before the Oireachtas European Affairs Committee on how to help with recruitment of Irish people to the EU institutions and better communicate what the European Union does in Ireland. He has also been a witness before the UK House of Lords Committees.

He is also a past chairman of the "Political Science" section of the Global Undergraduate Awards.

== Scholarly work ==
Some of O'Brennan's scholarly works engage with EU Enlargement policy. He is the author of The Eastern Enlargement of the European Union (Routledge, 2006, 2009) and National Parliaments within the Enlarged European Union: from 'victims' of integration to competitive actors? (Routledge, with Tapio Raunio, 2007).

Other published works by O'Brennan focus on Ireland's relationship with the EU. O'Brennan has published numerous journal articles on this theme and is the editor of two special issues of Irish Political Studies (with Mary C. Murphy, UCC) and Administration on Ireland and European integration. An earlier essay focused on Ireland’s struggle to be accepted as a member of the EU in the 1960s and early 1970s. Murphy and O'Brennan frequently collaborate on opinion pieces about Ireland and the EU. In advance of the 2016 Brexit referendum in the United Kingdom they argued that the UK could learn a lot from the Irish experience of holding regular referendums on EU constitutional issues. They contributed to an episode of Talking History on Newstalk FM in late 2022 which focused on Ireland’s five decades of membership of the EU. O'Brennan has been a critic of how some in Ireland’s political class deal with European Union issues.

O'Brennan is the co-author (with Dr. Barry Colfer, IIEA) of the Ireland report in the Bertelsman Stiftung's annual analysis of the Sustainable Development Goals (SDGs) and the 2021 report on Ireland’s management of the Covid-19 crisis.

O'Brennan has spent several periods living and working in Bulgaria and has written a number of pieces of commentary on Bulgaria's political landscape and relationship with the EU. He was a critic of the obstruction of free movement for Bulgarian and Romanian citizens within the EU.

He has been a contributor to Carnegie Europe's "Judy Asks" series, which invites comment on contemporary issues.

In 2022, he published a critique of Vladimir Putin in the Dublin Review of Books.
