= Michael Brennan =

Michael, Mike or Mick Brennan may refer to:

== Sport ==
- Micka Brennan (1914–1987), Irish hurler
- Mike Brennan (footballer, born 1941), English footballer for Bury and Tranmere Rovers, see List of Bury F.C. players (1–24 appearances)
- Mick Brennan (hurler) (born 1950), Irish hurler
- Micky Brennan (born 1952), English footballer
- Michael Brennan (footballer) (born 1965), former Australian rules footballer
- Mike Brennan (American football) (born 1967), American football tackle
- Mike Brennan (basketball) (born 1972), American college basketball head coach
- Michael Brennan (field hockey) (born 1975), Australian field hockey player
- Mick Brennan (alpine skier) (born 1979), English skier
- Michael Brennan (ice hockey) (born 1986), American professional ice hockey player
- Michael Brennan (golfer) (born 2002), American professional golfer

== Other ==
- Michael Brennan (Fine Gael politician) (1884–1970), Irish Cumann na nGaedhael and (later) Fine Gael TD
- Michael Brennan (Lieutenant-General) (1896–1986), Irish Defence Forces Chief of Staff 1931–1940
- Michael Brennan (actor) (1912–1982), English film and television actor
- Michael Brennan (finance) (1942–2026), British-born American finance professor
- Michael Brennan (photographer) (born 1943), British photographer
- Michael Brennan (Progressive Democrats politician) (born 1946), Irish Progressive Democrat Senator
- Michael F. Brennan (born 1953), mayor of Portland and Maine state senator
- Michael B. Brennan (born 1963), American lawyer and United States federal judge
- Michael Brennan (poet) (born 1973), Australian poet
