= Brennan Motor Manufacturing Company =

Defunct American motor vehicle manufacturer

- Company type: Automobile Manufacturing, Truck manufacturing, Engine manufacturing
- Industry: Automotive, engine manufacture
- Genre: Touring cars, Trucks, Automobile engines, Marine engines
- Founded: 1897
- Founder: Patrick H. Brennan (1865–1934)
- Defunct: 1972
- Fate: Son of founder, retired
- Headquarters: Syracuse, New York, United States
- Area served: United States
- Key people: Emmett A. Brennan (born 1890), president until 1972
- Products: Automobiles; Engines
- Subsidiaries: Automobiles (1902–1908)

Brennan Motor Manufacturing Company (1897–1972) of Syracuse, New York, was an early manufacturer of automobile engines. From 1902 until 1908, the company produced the Brennan automobile however, after the demise of the automobile enterprise, the company again turned their focus to automobile engines and later marine engines. They were in business for 75 years when the company closed its doors in 1972.

== History ==
The company was founded in 1897 by Patrick H. Brennan (1865 – January 22, 1934) and was known as Brennan Motor Manufacturing Company or Brennan Motor Company. The company motto was "Simplicity and durability."

Brennan was first engaged in the manufacture of bicycles before turning to construction of automobiles. Eldest son, Emmett A. Brennan (born 1890), took control of the company in 1934 when his father died and was president of the establishment until July 1972, when he retired.

=== Automobile production ===
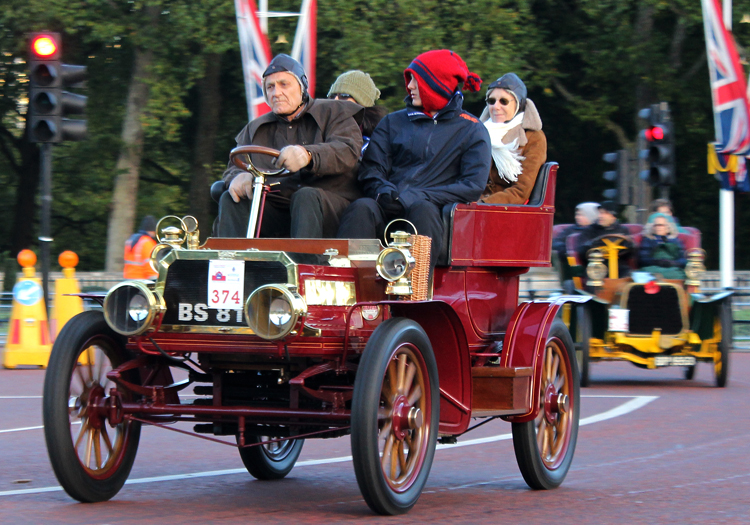
1904 Brennan 14/18HP Rear-entrance tonneau

For a brief period from 1902 until 1908, the company produced the Brennan automobile. The firm would take up auto manufacturing rarely, when demand would be slow. The auto had power unit mid-mounted under the floor and central chain transmission; however, Brennan instead placed the drive to make it go through a sliding gearbox, rather than the then common epicyclic system. Each auto was fitted with a horizontally opposed two-cylinder engine. The rest of the vehicle had a more conventional design with full-elliptic springs, right-hand drive and channel or angle iron section chassis.

The 1902 "touring car" came complete with a 15-horsepower motor and a double opposed cylinder, horizontal motor and weighed 1,950 pounds. Ignition was by jump spark supplied by dry batteries. Two sets of batteries were carried under the bonnet and front of the dash.

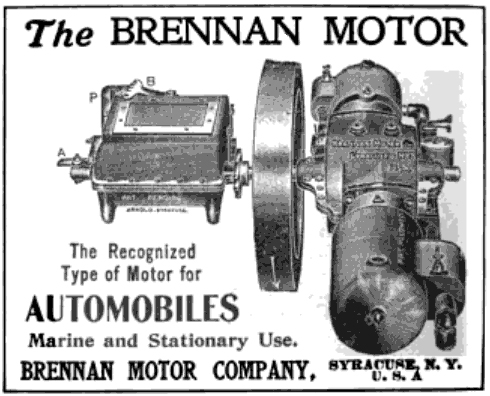
A 1904 Brennan Motor Company advertisement

==== Automobile shows ====
The company was "pronounced the best of its kind" at the Chicago Show in June 1902, as a result of years of experience and the satisfactory use from Maine to California.

In November 1902, Brennan was an exhibitor at the Madison Square Garden Show in New York City. The event included 114 firms such as Century Motor Vehicle Company of Syracuse, Buckmobile Company of Utica, New York and H. H. Franklin Manufacturing Company, also of Syracuse.

==== Custom vehicles ====
In March 1908, an automobile gear and 28-horsepower engine for a light touring car were shipped from Syracuse to Java. The machine was from the Brennan factory and it was consigned to a Java importer. The body for the vehicle was built in Java. The machine was shipped by rail to New York City and from there by water to its final destination.

By 1914, the company was advertising automobile parts such as auto engines, pressed steel frames, transmission gears and automobile bodies for sale. The firm was located at 108 Grape Street.

=== Automobile engines ===
In June 1902, the company was already producing Brennan Standard Motors which ran from 4 to 30 horsepower. According to advertisements, they were the "recognized type of motor for automobiles." Both water-cooled and air-cooled engines as well as mufflers and vaporizers were manufactured at the company's plant. They also offered a special 8 horsepower motor with a transmission gear.

By early 1903, the company had to enlarge its factory and hire more workers to fill the demand for gasoline motors which it sold to both large manufacturers and individuals. The firm had worked up a large and profitable business by furnishing motors in connection with completed drawings for automobiles.

After the automobile business failed in 1908, the company focused on engines. They produced vehicle motors that were standardized for the "special service of light vehicles of the runabout class and for the finer styles of automobiles for high speed." Brennan was a pioneer building internal combustion engines of its own designs. The company also made component parts for its engines.

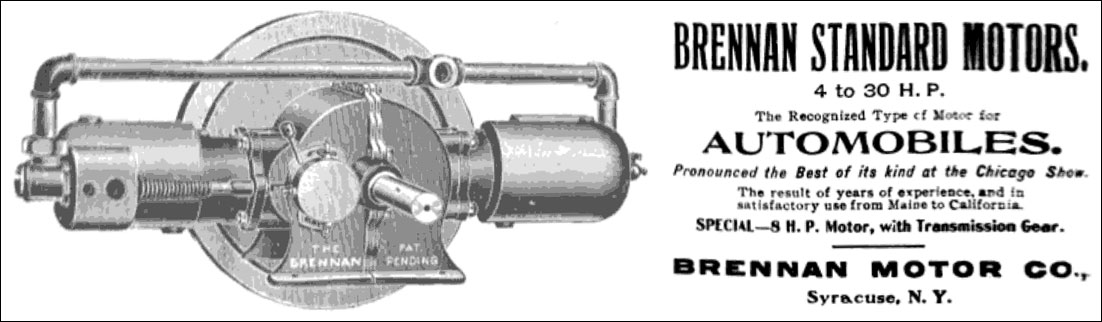
A 1902 advertisement for a Brennan engine – The Horseless Age, June 5, 1902

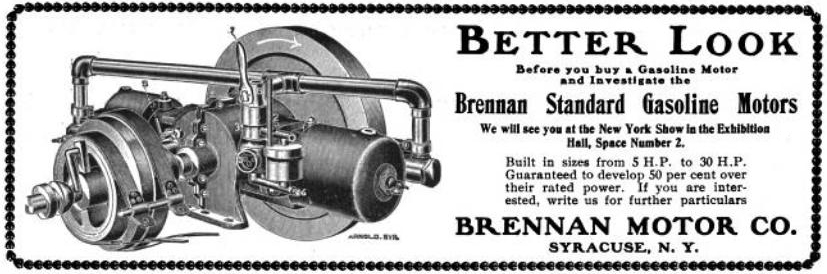
A 1902 advertisement for a Brennan engine – The Automobile Review, December 15, 1902

=== Marine engines ===
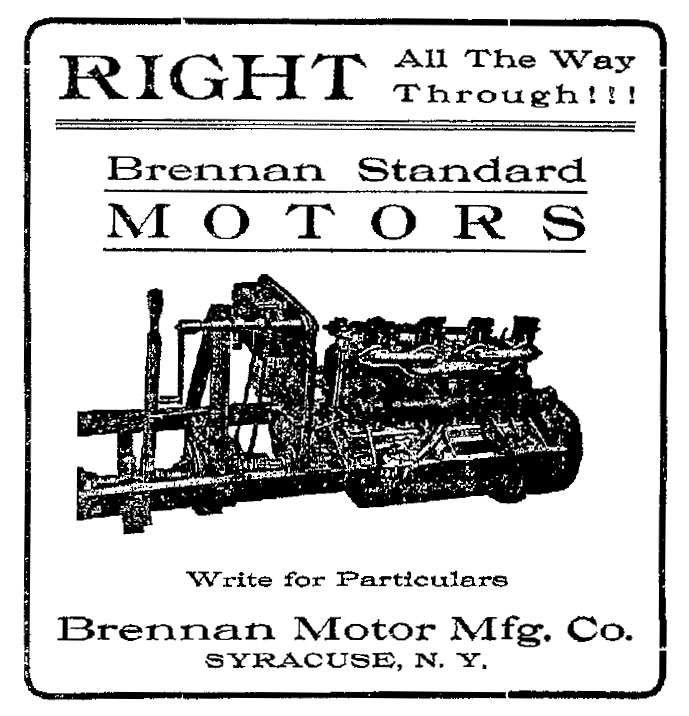
A 1910 Brennan Motor Manufacturing Company advertisement – Syracuse Post-Standard, September 12, 1910

Later on the company produced engines for motor boats.

A small, four-cylinder marine engine called the Imp was one of Brennan's most popular engines.

==== Motor boat shows ====
Syracuse was not largely represented in the Motor Boat Show that took place in New York City in late February 1910, at the Madison Square Garden. The manufacturers of power boats and gasoline engines were too busy to devote any time to the exposition. Their chief competitors from Syracuse, engine manufacturers, the Barber Brothers, represented by Charles E. Barber and H. J. Leighton, did not participate in the event.

P. J. Brennan, said that he could not get away from business to see the show. In discussing the show, Brennan said: "We exhibited for nine years at a winter motor boat show. We found that it interfered with business and decided to withdraw. This is the busiest time of year with the motor boat manufacturer, and it is especially true this year. The manufacturers have tried to get the show changed to the fall season, but the dealers want it in the winters so they can land orders. We'll stay at home and turn out the goods and let the dealers get the business"

The B. F. Brown Gas Engine Company was among the big exhibitors at the show.

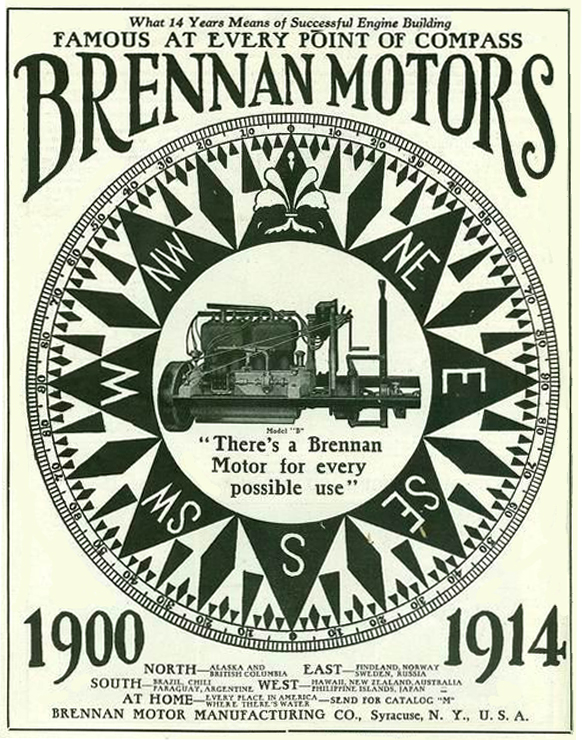
Brennan Motor Manufacturing – 1900–1914

In 1956, Marshall Brennan formed a partnership with George Shehadi to manufacture custom inboard boats. The Thompson Boat Factory on Cortland Avenue made the hulls and the motors were manufactured by the Brennan Motor Manufacturing Company at 103 South Townsend Street.

==== Motor boat distributor ====
By April 1928, Brennan was a distributor for the "famous" Albany, a 23 feet (7.0 m) runabout, powered by the Brennan marine motor. The price range was $2,200 through $3,000 and top speed of 35 miles per hour (56 km/h). They also offered the Albany cruiser. The company advertised "there is a Brennan for every size and type of boat up to 75 feet (23 m) with both 4-cylinder and 6-cylinder types and 15 to 200-horsepower. The most highly advertised model was the Brennan De Luxe Six, a 100-horsepower motor that was "reliable since 1897." During 1928, the firm advertised they had boats, engines and outboard motors on display at their plant at 500 East Water Street.

=== War work ===
In March 1943, at the beginning of World War II, Brennan was awarded a subcontract for turning out machine-gun plates for the Doyle Corporation.

=== Company officers ===
On January 15, 1906, the annual meeting was held and the Brennan Motor Manufacturing Company elected the following directors; P. H. Brennan, A. C. Brennan, T. J. Brennan, Ernest R. Deming and Arthur Perkins.

Emmett A. Brennan was an officer of the Brennan Motor Company. He was married to Anna Carroll Brennan (died 1976), formerly of Scott Avenue.

=== Employees ===
Help wanted – Syracuse Herald, October 12, 1918

By 1918, the company headquarters were located at 101 Grape Street and they were hiring lathe operators and trying to find young men interested in training as machinists. A local newspaper advertised in the classified section showed that the company was also hiring bench hands "on government work."

During 1946, the company was located at 105 South Townsend Street and they were hiring machine workers to operate their Brown and Turret Lathes, Bar and Chuck, Engine Lathes, Sharpe millers and Cincinnati millers.

By July 1972, the company employed nearly 100 employees, mostly shipping parts and components for its engines.

=== Plant facilities ===
On January 1, 1910, the firm announced they were adding an addition to their plant on Grape Street.

During August 1928, the company remodeled their plant at the corner of Water and South Townsend streets, a brick building, for a cost of $800.

By 1972, they were situated in seven buildings on 500 East Water Street at South Townsend Street in Syracuse. Most of the real property owned by the firm had already been sold by July 1972 when the company closed.

=== Truck production ===
Brennan was manufacturing trucks as early as 1906 and in June 1912, they announced that the company had started production of 2, 3 and 5 ton motor trucks.

=== Company closes ===
At the time the company closed its doors in July 1972, the firm was producing standard high grade four-cycle marine engines and Brennan engines. The firm closed because company president, Emmett A. Brennan, (born 1890) retired.

== Advertisements ==
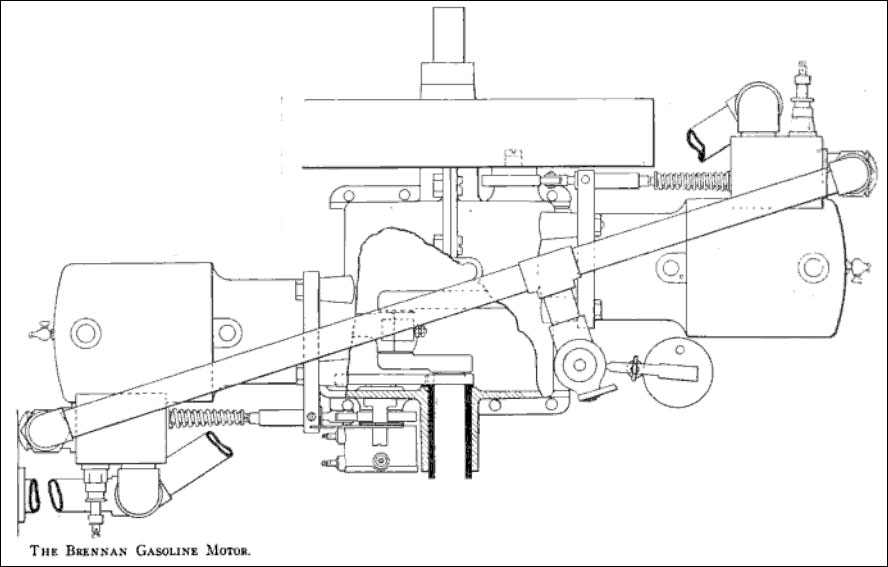
Brennan 5 horsepower, double, opposite cylinder gasoline motor is of usual four-cycle type and has a double throw crank – The Horseless Age, 1901

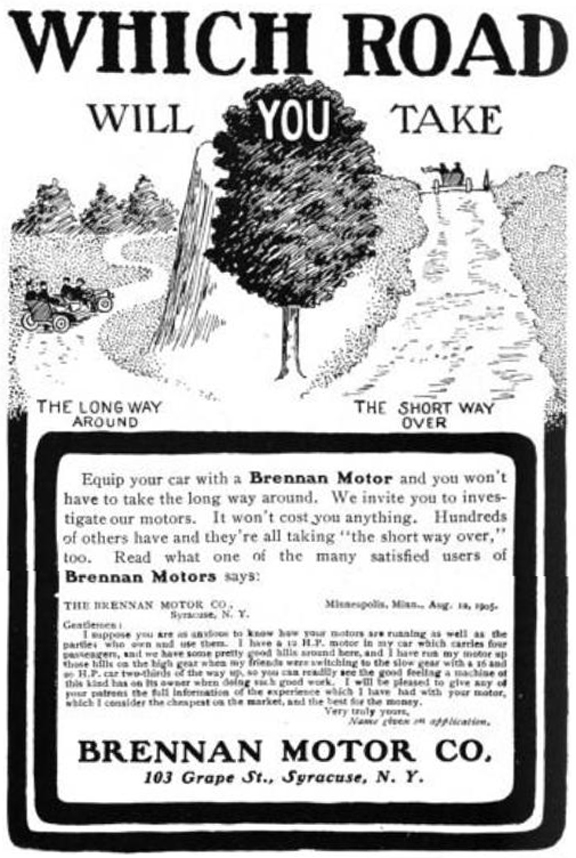
A 1905 advertisement for a Brennan Motor Co.

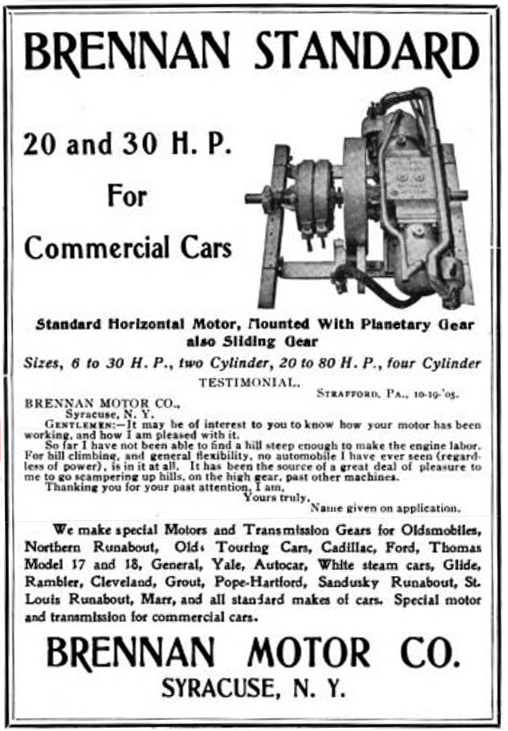
A 1905 advertisement for a Brennan Motor Co.

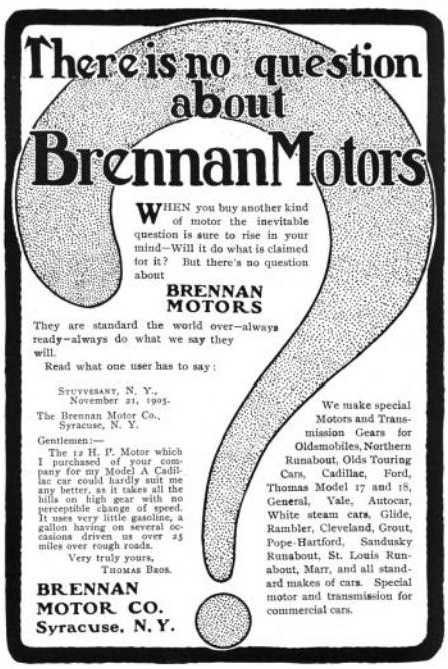
A 1906 advertisement for a Brennan Motor Co.

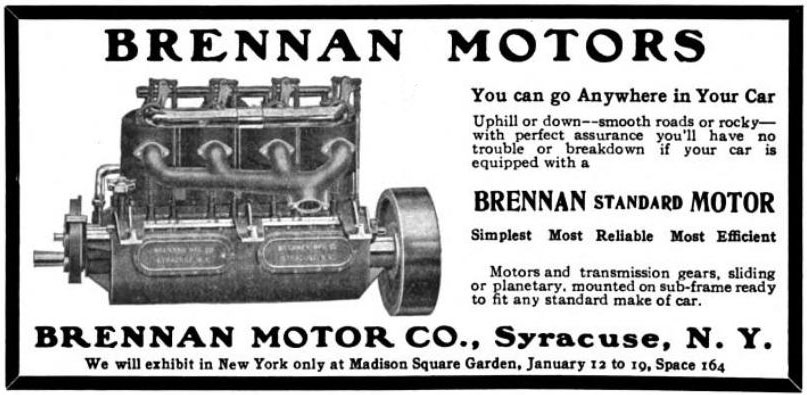
A 1906 advertisement for a Brennan motor – Automotive Industries, 1906

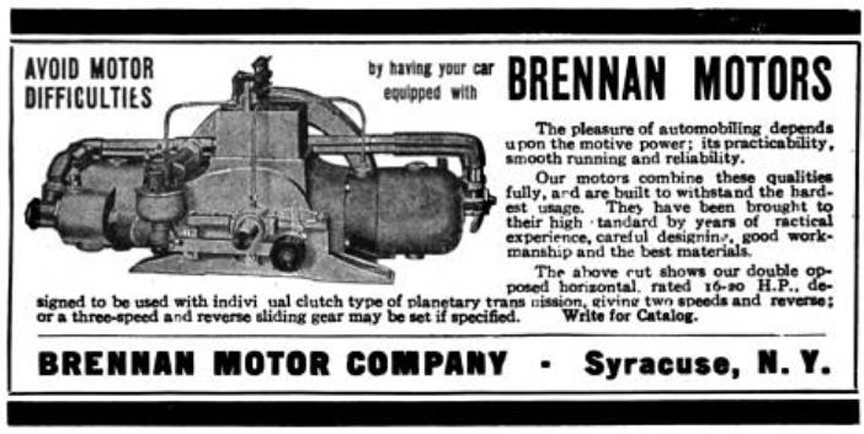
A 1906 advertisement for a Brennan Motor Co.

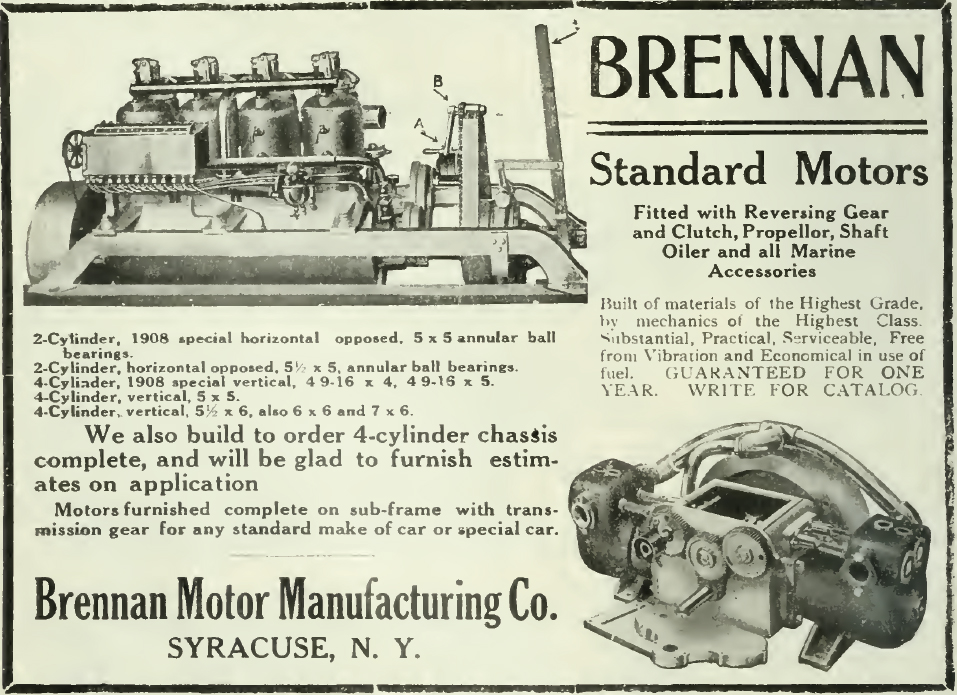
A 1908 advertisement for a Brennan Motor Co.
