= Martin Brennan (footballer) =

English footballer (born 1982)

Personal information
- Full name: Martin Ian Brennan
- Date of birth: 14 September 1982 (age 44)
- Place of birth: Whipps Cross, England
- Height: 6 ft 1 in (1.85 m)
- Position: Goalkeeper

Team information
- Current team: Boreham Wood (goalkeeping coach)
- Number: 31

Youth career
- ?–2000: Tottenham Hotspur

Senior career*
Years	Team	Apps	(Gls)
2000–2002	Charlton Athletic	0	(0)
2002–2004	Cambridge United	1	(0)
2004	Welling United	?	(?)
2004	Stevenage Borough	0	(0)
2004–2005	Dagenham & Redbridge	1	(0)
2017	Hampton & Richmond Borough	0	(0)
2020–	Boreham Wood	0	(0)
- * Club domestic league appearances and goals

Martin Ian Brennan (born 14 September 1982) is an English former professional footballer who played as a goalkeeper and is now goalkeeping coach at Boreham Wood.

== Career ==
Brennan was born in Whipps Cross, Greater London. He began as a trainee at Charlton Athletic, before moving to Cambridge United for the 2002–03 season, where he played three times, once in each of the league, FA Cup and Football League Trophy. He then had brief spells with Welling United and Stevenage Borough, before retiring from playing after spending the 2004–05 season with Dagenham & Redbridge.

He then moved into goalkeeper coaching, becoming under-18s coach at Tottenham Hotspur. In 2008 he joined Wycombe Wanderers as first team goalkeeping coach, a position he held until 2012, when he moved on to Fulham. He coached their under-21 goalkeepers for two years, during which time he also appeared on the bench as an over-age player for the under-21s for three games in the 2013–14 season. Brennan was promoted to first team goalkeeping coach in 2014. He left for Leyton Orient in 2016, moving to Hampton & Richmond Borough the following year. He was registered as a player at the Beveree in October 2017, appearing on the bench for three games. In 2019 he joined the backroom staff at Boreham Wood, where he was once again registered as a player in October 2020 and featured on the bench.
