= Paul Brennan (Northern Ireland musician) =

British musician

Paul Brennan is a traditional musician from County Down, Northern Ireland who has lived in London for a number of years. As well as this he also taught in a primary school based in West London called Willow Tree Primary School.

Brennan co-founded the Belfast School of Piping. Since moving to London he has formed three working bands:

- Carrig (Irish traditional)
- Orchestrad (17th/18th-century Irish harp-tune ensemble)
- Paul Brennan Band (Irish covers in a rock style)

As well as advertising and television work he has worked on film music for such composers and directors as Merchant Ivory, Neil Jordan, George Fenton, James Horner, Trevor Jones, Howard Shore and Disney. He has been a soloist with the London Philharmonic Orchestra and the Royal Philharmonic Orchestra (Royal Albert Hall Proms, 1999). He has worked and recorded with The Fat Lady Sings, Kiki Dee, Jose Feliciano, Elton John, Pentangle, and Dreadzone. He was a member of Incantation for two years, and he co-arranged and toured worldwide with the Rambert Dance Company's ballet, Sergeant Early's Dream.

He was part of a team of musicians who contributed to the development of Andrew Lloyd Webber's musical The Beautiful Game, and has performed for members of the British royal family. His album Fire In The Soul was voted album of the year by the British Music Association in 1993. Played the role of a medieval musician in Ridley Scott's film -Robin Hood (cinema version). Introduced, played and co-arranged the music in Harry Potter-Deathly Hallows Part One (the wedding scene)
