= Michael John Brenan =

Michael John Brenan (1780 – 1847) was an Irish Roman Catholic priest and a scholar of church history who gained notoriety through his temporary defection from the Catholic Church to the Church of Ireland (Anglican).

== Early life and education ==
Brenan was born in Kilkenny, in the Kingdom of Ireland, the son of a stonemason. After his ordination to the Catholic priesthood, Brenan quickly obtained a reputation as a preacher, but, possibly out of personal issues, quickly came into collision with his bishop and was suspended from his office. He then left the Catholic Church, became an Anglican and was taken up by an early form of the later Priests' Protection Society under whose auspices he was announced to preach at St. George's Church in Dublin. In the meantime he reconsidered his position and repented of his defection.

== Career ==
Brenan resolved to make public reparation for his defection to Anglicanism. On the Sunday in 1809 that he was announced to commence his campaign against the Catholic Church, he ascended the pulpit of St. George's, began by blessing himself most reverently, and then to the relief of his audience took up the Bible, and said "This is the Word of God". After a brief pause, he added deliberately and earnestly, "And I swear by its contents that every word I have uttered against the Catholic Church is a lie", and at once left the building.

Brenan went to a neighbouring Capuchin friary, explained what had happened, and begged to be admitted into the order. After some time, his request was granted, and he became a Capuchin friar at Wexford, where in later years he wrote (as a penance, it is said) his Ecclesiastical History of Ireland (2 vols., Dublin, 1840, revised ed., 1864).

== Death ==
Brenan died in Dublin during February 1847.
