= Owen Brennan (footballer) =

Australian rules footballer

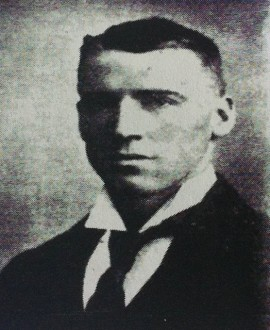
- Brennan in 1900

Personal information
- Full name: Owen Brennan
- Born: 18 August 1877; Collingwood, Victoria
- Died: 26 January 1961 (aged 83); Kew, Victoria
- Original team: Collingwood Juniors
- Height: 184 cm (6 ft 0 in)
- Weight: 83 kg (183 lb)

Playing career^{1}
Years	Club	Games (Goals)
1900	Collingwood	11 (1)
- ^{1} Playing statistics correct to the end of 1900.

Owen Brennan (18 August 1877 – 26 January 1961) was an Australian rules footballer who played with Collingwood in the Victorian Football League (VFL).
