= Brennan (given name) =

Brennan, Braonán
- Gender: unisex

Origin
- Origin: Irish
- Meaning: "raven", "sorrow", "droplet", "brave"
- Region of origin: Ireland

Other names
- Related names: Brendan

Brennan and Braonán are masculine given names, but Brennan can be a feminine given name. The given name Brennan is considered to be mainly an Irish or Gaelic name. The Gaelic personal name Braonán is derived from the Irish braon, meaning "drop". An alternative derivation is from the personal name Branán, a diminutive of the word bran, meaning "raven". In some cases the given name Brennan may be a contracted form of the given name Brendan.

== People ==
- Brennan Bernardino (born 1992), American baseball player
- Brennan Boesch (born 1985), American baseball player
- Brennan Brown (born 1968), American film and television actor
- Brennan Carroll (born 1979), American football coach
- Brennan Clost (born 1994), Canadian dancer and actor
- Brennan Curtin (born 1980), American football offensive tackle
- Brennan Elliott (born 1975), Canadian actor
- Brennan Evans (born 1982), Canadian ice hockey player
- Brennan Heart, stage name of Fabian Bohn (born 1982), Dutch DJ and producer of hardstyle
- Brennan Hesser (born 1980), American television actress
- Brennan Jackson (born 2000), American football player
- Brennan Johnson (born 2001), Welsh footballer
- Brennan LaBrie (born 1999), American journalist for Time for Kids
- Brennan Manning (1934–2013), American author, laicized priest, and public speaker
- Brennan Lee Mulligan (born 1988), American comedian, writer, performer, and gamemaster
- Brennan Newberry (born 1990), American stock car racing driver
- Brennan Poole (born 1991), American stock car racing driver
- Brennan Presley (born 2002), American football player
- Brennan Rubie (born 1991), American alpine ski racer
- Brennan Scarlett (born 1993), American football outside linebacker
- Brennan Stack (born 1988), Australian rules footballer
- Brennan Taylor, American role-playing games author and publisher
- Brennan Ward (born 1988), American mixed martial artist

== See also ==
- Brenan, given name and surname
- Brennen, given name and surname
