= Bastion (disambiguation) =

A bastion is a fortification work projecting outward from the main enclosure.

Bastion may also refer to:

== Arts and media ==
- Bastion (band), a Yugoslav synth-pop band
- Bastions (band), a Welsh hardcore punk band
- Bastion (comics), a Marvel Comics supervillain
- Bastion (video game), a 2011 action role-playing video game by Supergiant Games
- Bastion (Overwatch), a character in the 2016 video game Overwatch

== Military ==
- Bastion fort
- Bastion (naval), a heavily defended area of water in which friendly naval forces can operate safely
- 9M117 Bastion, an anti-tank missile
- K-300P Bastion-P, a coastal defense missile system
- Camp Bastion, the main British military base in Afghanistan
- USS Bastion (ACM-6), a 1942 minelayer in World War 2
- ACMAT Bastion, a modern French armoured personnel carrier

== Other uses ==
- Bastion, a special form of Gabion
- Bastion (Irish restaurant), a restaurant in Kinsale, Ireland
- Bastion (Nashville restaurant)
- Bastion (agency), a global marketing and advertising company
- The Bastion Museum, dedicated to the work of Jean Cocteau in Menton, France
- Bastion host, a computer on a network specifically designed and configured to withstand attack
- Bastion Misawa, a fictional duelist

== See also ==
- Bastian, German name
