= Mujo =

Mujo is a Bosnian hypocorism of either Mustafa or Muhamed.

Mujo may also refer to:

== People ==
- Mujo Muković (born 1963), Serbian politician from the country's Bosniak community
- Mujo Sočica (died 1941), Montenegrin and Serbian politician and lawyer
- Mujo Ulqinaku (1896–1939), Albanian sergeant
- Yllka Mujo (born 1953), Albanian actress

== Other ==
- Mujo (film)
- Mujō (restaurant), a Michelin-starred restaurant in Atlanta, Georgia
- Mujō, Japanese name for impermanence
