= Kolobok =

Character of an East Slavic fairy tale

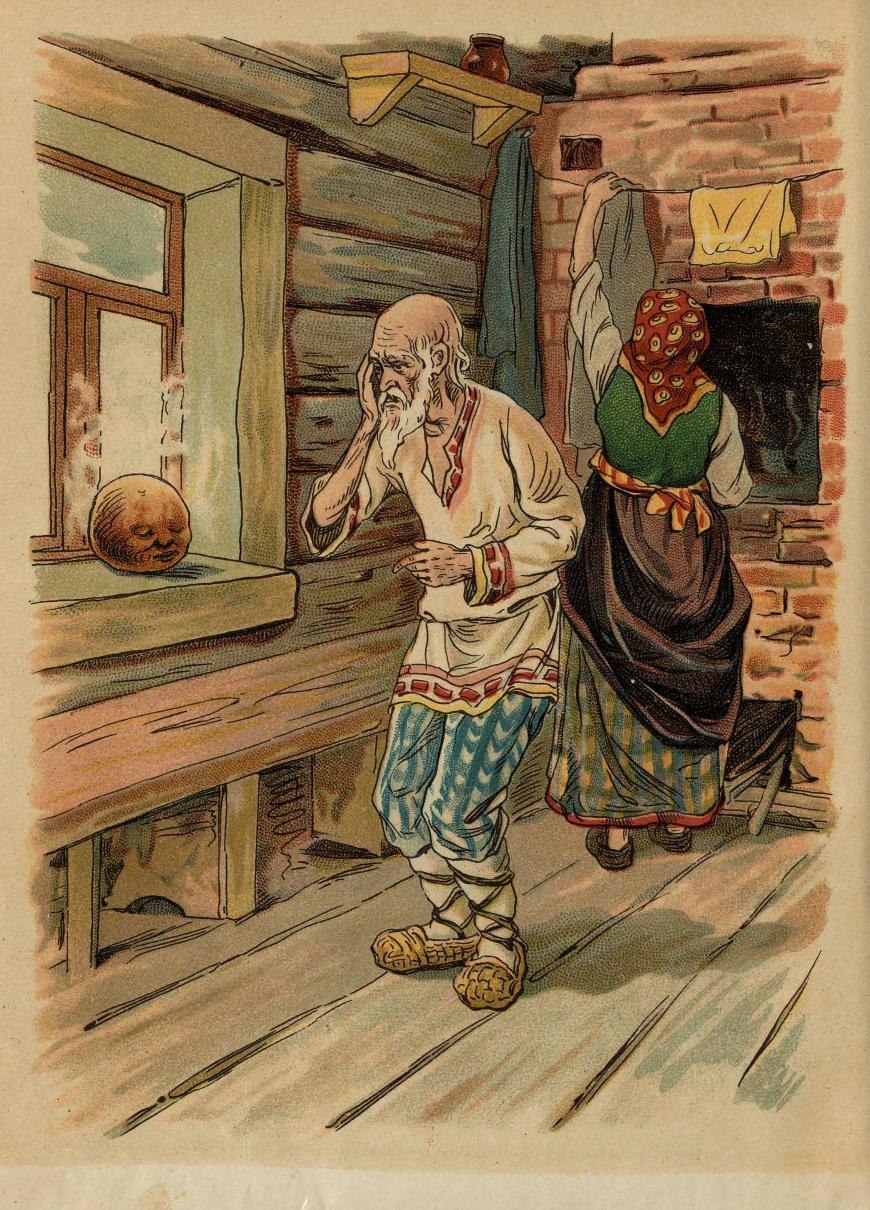
Illustration of Kolobok from the 1913 A. Medvedev Russian edition

Kolobok (Russian: Колобо́к) is the main character of an East Slavic fairy-tale with the same name, represented as a small yellow spherical bread-like being. The story is often called "Little Round Bun" and sometimes "The Runaway Bun." In other Slavic regions, it is often adapted to local variation of a kolobok. For example, in Bulgaria it is known as "The Wheat Pita" (Bulgarian: Житената питка, romanized: Zhitenata pitka 'wheat pita'), wheat pita being a traditional Bulgarian dish.

The fairy tale occurs widely in Slavic regions in a number of other variations. Bulgarian author Angel Karalyichev adapted the story in his fairytales book for children in 1948. In his home town of Strazhitsa, there is annual festival of wheat pita bread dedicated to the character from the tale. A similar fairy tale – with a pancake rolling off – has also been recorded in German and Nordic regions. The plot is similar to that of "The Gingerbread Man" tale in English tradition. The Aarne-Thompson index classifies such stories in a common type: 2025.

== Etymology ==
The origin of word kolobok is not clear, and has several proposed versions:

- connected with Proto-Slavic: *klǫbъ ("Something twisted, has a round form, similar to a ball", "club");
- has appearance in Latvian: kukulītis ("a piece of bread");
- from Proto-Slavic: *kolo ("circle", "wheel"), that is, "that which is round and rolling";
- from Greek: κόλλαβος ("kind of wheat bread, pie");

In 2011, Ukraine claimed the origin of kolobok came from the Ukrainian word kolo meaning round, while Russia claimed its origin came from the Russian word kolob, meaning round dough, with risen dough called kolebyatka. There are also many other versions.

== Plot ==
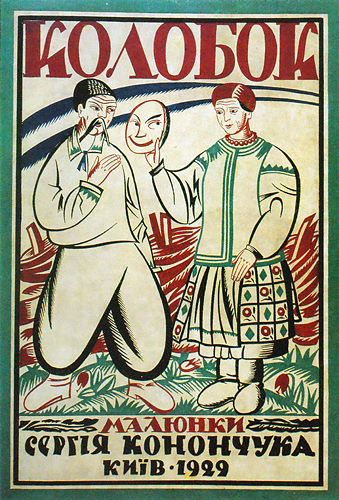
1929 drawing of grandfather, grandmother, and Kolobok by Serhii Pylypovych Kononchuk

Kolobok is translated from Ukrainian as "small round bun", or from Russian as round dough, though it has also been thought to reference the Eastern European Bread kalach, or possibly a round palt (based on the Swedish food item of the same name). The character named Kolobok suddenly comes to life from such a creation and escapes from the home of an old man and old woman (often referred to as a grandpa and grandma). In the Ukrainian fairy tale version, the old man and old woman are very poor, and Kolobok is made with the very last food they scraped together to eat. While Kolobok is pursued by the old man and the old woman, he has repetitive meetings with various animals (often a rabbit, wolf, and bear) who intend to eat him, but Kolobok cunningly escapes by distracting each animal with song, then running away before he can be caught.

With each animal Kolobok sings a repeated song. The words of Kolobok's song vary by storyteller. Sometimes they vary each verse. Kolobok commonly sings: "I got away from Grandmother, I got away from Grandfather, and I will certainly get away from you." In Irina Zheleznova's 1985 version he sings: "I was scraped from the flour-box and swept from the bin and baked in the oven and cooled on the sill. I ran away from Grandpa, I ran away from Grandma, and I'll run away from you, this minute I will!" In Christina Oparenko's version, he sings: "I was made from flour and yeast, I was baked in the oven, I shall run away from you." In Barbara Suwyn's retelling, the bun sings: "I'm a little round bun straight from the oven and I roll all day beneath the golden sun. I rolled from the farmer and I rolled from his wife, and I'll roll from you for my life, life, life. If you want to catch me, you can run, run, run, but I'll just roll away, 'cause I'm a little round bun." The fox manages to finally catch and eat Kolobok through trickery. The fox first distracts Kolobok by praising the bun's singing. The fox flatters the bun by telling Kolobok that it needs to come closer so that he can hear its singing better. In other versions, the fox pretends he wants to hear Kolobok's singing better but cannot because he claims to have hearing problems.

== Variations ==
The fairy tale in Czech is named O Koblížkovi, where Koblížek is the main character. His name comes from Kobliha, which is the same doughnut as the Polish sweet pączki or Croatian, Bosnian, and Serbian Krafne. In Slovak, the story is called O Pampúchovi (About Doughnut), Ako išiel Pampúch na vandrovku (How Doughnut went to wander), or the equivalent using the diminutive Pampúšik. Pampúch is the Slovak word for the same type of pampushka, Slavic doughnut.

In the German regions a very similar fairy tale was recorded in 1854 by Carl and Theodor Colshorn. In the book Märchen und Sagen aus Hannover the Low German story "Dicke fette Pannekauken, blief stahn, eck will di fräten!" has an identical plot, however, at the end the "Pannkauken" (pancake) meets hungry orphan children and so it lets itself be eaten. The name of the tale was later shortened to Low German "De dicke fette Pannkoken" and Standard German "Der dicke fette Pfannkuchen", which both can be translated to "The thick fat pancake". In the books the pancake is often depicted with little feet. The end of the German tale differs from the Ukrainian and Russian. Instead of being eaten by one of the animals, the pancake gives himself to two poor children who have nothing else to eat.

In Norway a similar story was recorded in the 1840s by Peter Christen Asbjørnsen and published in the fairy tale book Norske Folkeeventyr as the story of the "Pannekaken". In this case the mother of seven children is baking pancakes, and one suddenly comes alive. The pancake rolls off (trillet og trillet) and out of the house. After the pancake encounters several animals, a sly pig manages to win the pancake's confidence and get close enough to eat it.

== Usage of the character ==
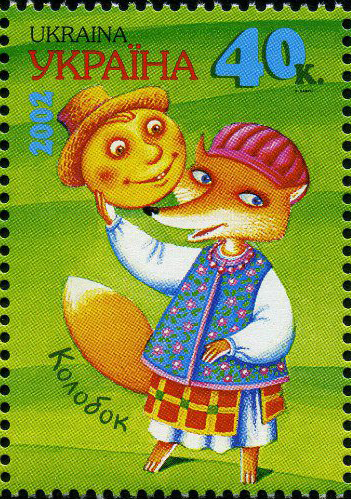
2002 stamp of Ukrposhta, featuring the East Slavic folk tale "Kolobok"

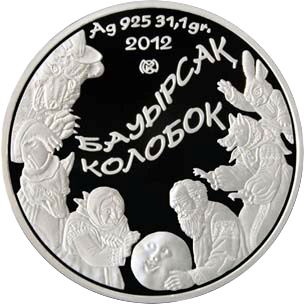
2012 coin featuring Kolobok, National Bank of Kazakhstan

In 2002, the character was featured on a postage stamp of the Ukrainian postal service, Ukrposhta.

In 2012, the National Bank of Kazakhstan issued a coin featuring Kolobok.

A depiction of Kolobok was used as a mascot for the 2016 Bandy World Championship.

In 2018, the crater on Ryugu, a near-Earth asteroid, has been given a name "Kolobok".

In 2020, Kolobok is featured in the movie The Last Warrior: Root of Evil.

In 2026, a spin-off prequel movie The Last Warrior: Kolobok features Kolobok as its main character.

== See also ==
- Bread roll, specifically Bap
- The Muffin Man
- The Magic Pudding
- The Gingerbread Boy, English version
- Roly poly (disambiguation), especially Jam Roly-Poly
- Ukrainian Fairy Tale
- Russian Fairy Tale
- Anpanman, a modern Japanese superhero with a round face made of anpan
