= List of Michelin-starred restaurants in the American South =

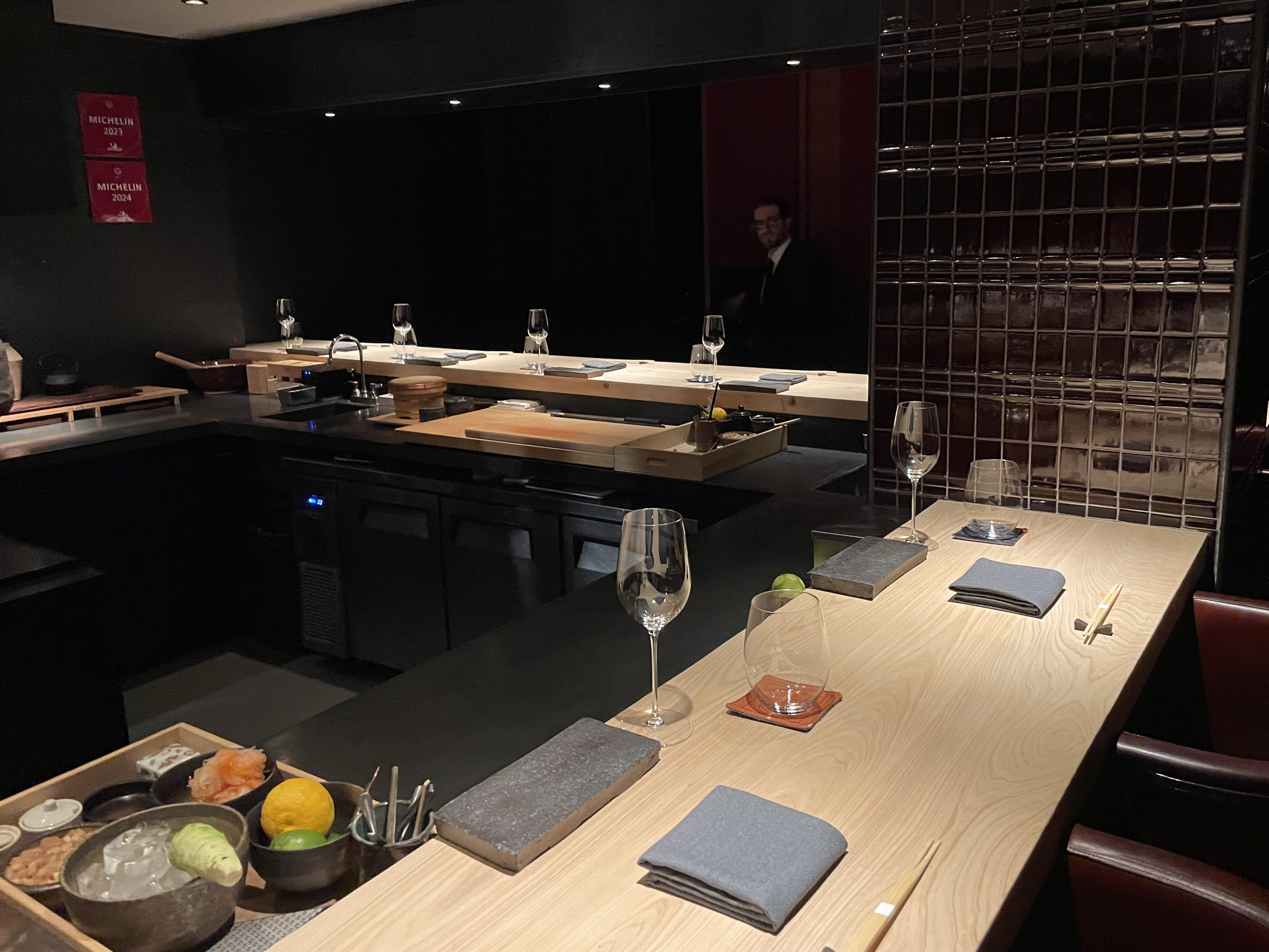
Interior of Mujō

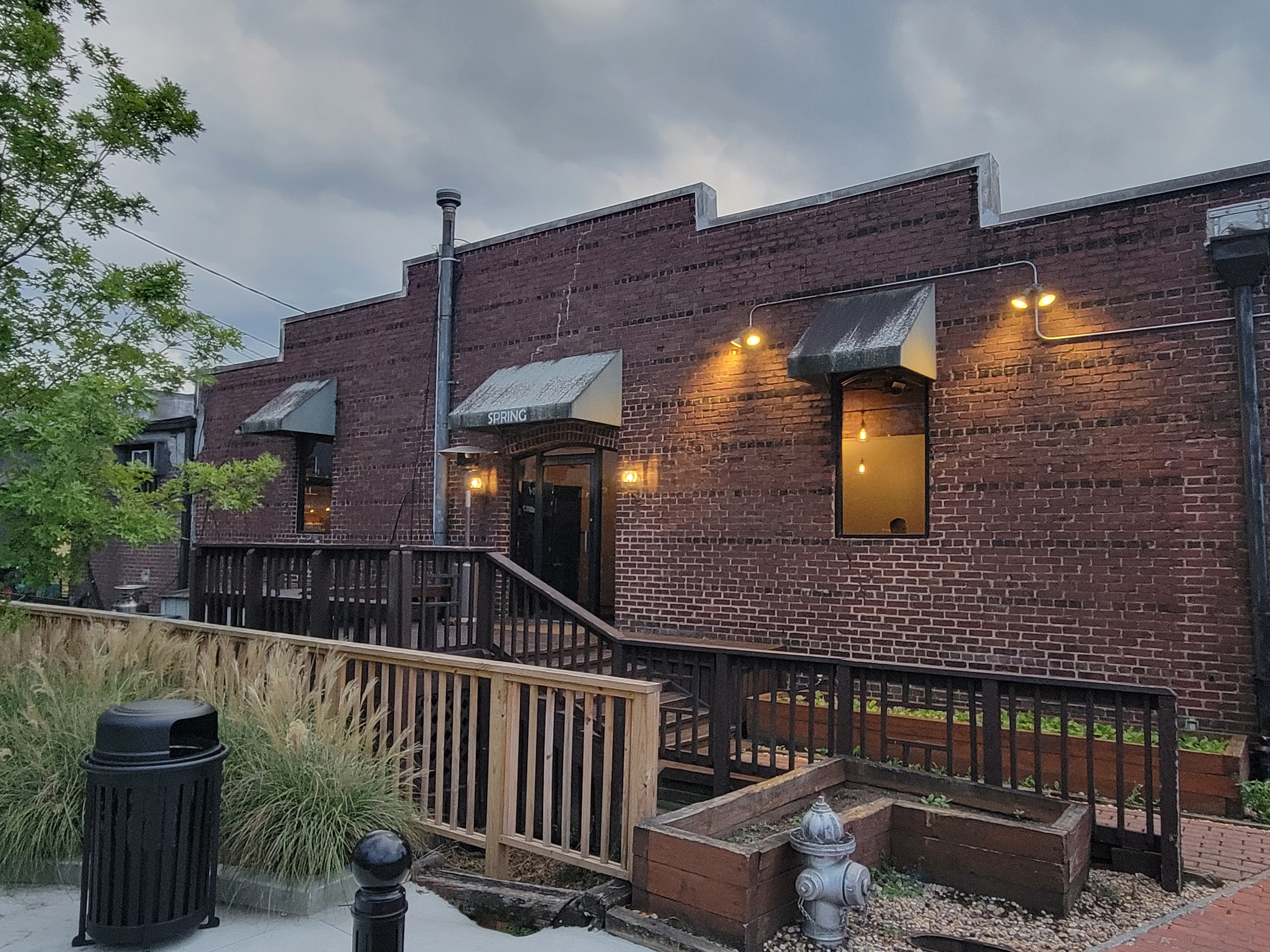
Exterior of Spring

As of the 2026 guide, there are 22 restaurants in the American South with a Michelin-star rating. Michelin classifies the American South region as the states of Alabama, Georgia, Louisiana, Mississippi, North Carolina, South Carolina and Tennessee.

The Michelin Guides have been published by the French tire company Michelin since 1900. They were designed as a guide to tell drivers about eateries they recommended to visit and to subtly sponsor their tires, by encouraging drivers to use their cars more and therefore need to replace the tires as they wore out. Over time, the stars that were given out started to become more valuable.

Multiple anonymous Michelin inspectors visit the restaurants several times. They rate the restaurants on five criteria: "quality of products", "mastery of flavor and cooking techniques", "the personality of the chef represented in the dining experience", "value for money", and "consistency between inspectors' visits". Inspectors have at least ten years of expertise and create a list of popular restaurants supported by media reports, reviews, and diner popularity. If they reach a consensus, Michelin awards restaurants from one to three stars based on its evaluation methodology: One star means "high-quality cooking, worth a stop", two stars signify "excellent cooking, worth a detour", and three stars denote "exceptional cuisine, worth a special journey". The stars are not permanent and restaurants are constantly being re-evaluated. If the criteria are not met, the restaurant will lose its stars.

The guide was announced on July 11, 2023, initially covering the city of Atlanta only. It became the seventh Michelin Guide region in the United States. The Atlanta Michelin Guide was jointly funded by the Atlanta Convention and Visitors Bureau. Media reports indicate that the Bureau allocated $1 million USD in private funding for a three-year contract with the Guide, which reviewed restaurants in the Atlanta-area through 2025. The inaugural selection and ratings were revealed on October 24, 2023 with five restaurants receiving a single Michelin star.

In April 2025, it was announced that the Atlanta guide was to be expanded into the American South guide the same year, covering additional states in the region. The guide is supported by Travel South USA for marketing and promotional activities. The inaugural restaurants were announced at a ceremony on November 3, 2025.

== Lists ==
=== American South (2025–2026) ===
Key
1 Michelin star	One Michelin star
2 Michelin stars	Two Michelin stars
—	The restaurant did not receive a star that year

Michelin-starred restaurants
Name	Cuisine	Location	2025	2026
Atlas	American	Georgia – Atlanta	1 Michelin star	1 Michelin star
Bacchanalia	American	Georgia – Atlanta	1 Michelin star	1 Michelin star
Bastion	Contemporary	Tennessee – Nashville	1 Michelin star	1 Michelin star
Counter	Contemporary	North Carolina – Charlotte	1 Michelin star	1 Michelin star
Dakar NOLA	Senegalese	Louisiana – New Orleans	—	1 Michelin star
Emeril's	Creole	Louisiana – New Orleans	2 Michelin stars	2 Michelin stars
Hayakawa	Japanese	Georgia – Atlanta	1 Michelin star	1 Michelin star
Lazy Betty	Contemporary	Georgia – Atlanta	1 Michelin star	1 Michelin star
Locust	Contemporary	Tennessee – Nashville	1 Michelin star	1 Michelin star
Malagón Mercado y Taperia	Spanish	South Carolina – Charleston	1 Michelin star	1 Michelin star
Mujō	Japanese	Georgia – Atlanta	1 Michelin star	1 Michelin star
O by Brush	Japanese	Georgia – Atlanta	1 Michelin star	1 Michelin star
Omakase Table	Japanese	Georgia – Atlanta	1 Michelin star	1 Michelin star
Saint-Germain	Contemporary	Louisiana – New Orleans	1 Michelin star	1 Michelin star
Scoundrel	French	South Carolina – Greenville	1 Michelin star	1 Michelin star
So. Fox	Southern	Georgia – Atlanta	—	1 Michelin star
Spring	Contemporary	Georgia – Marietta	1 Michelin star	1 Michelin star
The Catbird Seat	Contemporary	Tennessee – Nashville	1 Michelin star	1 Michelin star
Uberto Restaurant	Contemporary	Georgia – Gay	—	1 Michelin star
Vern's	American	South Carolina – Charleston	1 Michelin star	1 Michelin star
Wild Common	American	South Carolina – Charleston	1 Michelin star	1 Michelin star
Zasu	American	Louisiana – New Orleans	1 Michelin star	1 Michelin star
Reference(s)				

=== Atlanta (2023–2024) ===
Key
1 Michelin star	One Michelin star
—	The restaurant did not receive a star that year

Michelin-starred restaurants
Name	Cuisine	Location	2023	2024
Atlas	American	Atlanta – Buckhead	1 Michelin star	1 Michelin star
Bacchanalia	American	Atlanta – Westside	1 Michelin star	1 Michelin star
Hayakawa	Japanese	Atlanta – Westside	1 Michelin star	1 Michelin star
Lazy Betty	Contemporary	Atlanta – Midtown	1 Michelin star	1 Michelin star
Mujō	Japanese	Atlanta – Westside	1 Michelin star	1 Michelin star
O by Brush	Japanese	Atlanta – Buckhead	—	1 Michelin star
Omakase Table	Japanese	Atlanta – Westside	—	1 Michelin star
Spring	Contemporary	Marietta	—	1 Michelin star
Staplehouse (Note: Restaurant lost its star in 2025)	American	Atlanta – Eastside	—	1 Michelin star
Reference(s)				

== See also ==
- List of restaurants in Atlanta
- List of restaurants in New Orleans
