= List of restaurants in Atlanta =

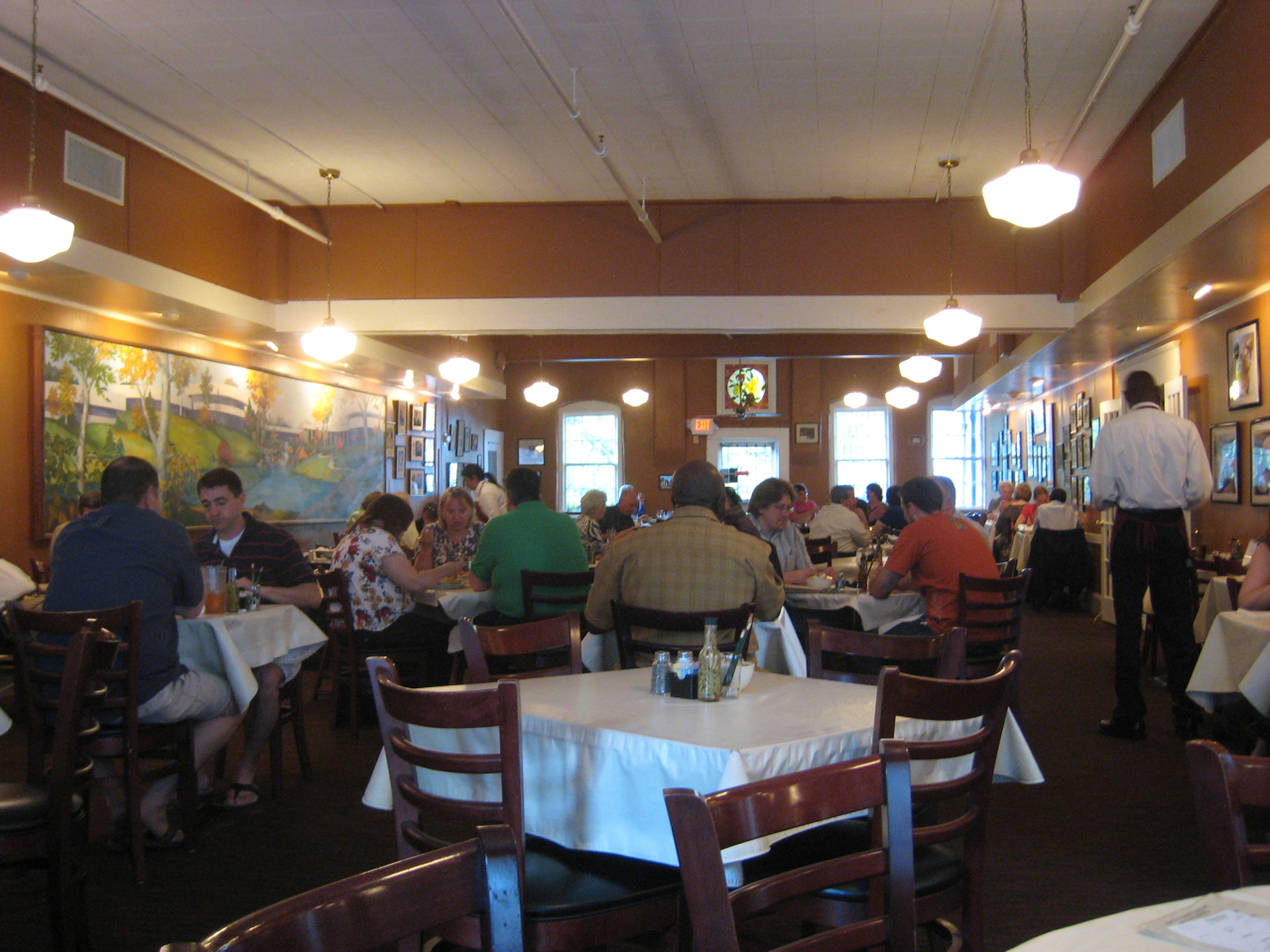
Mary Mac's Tea Room

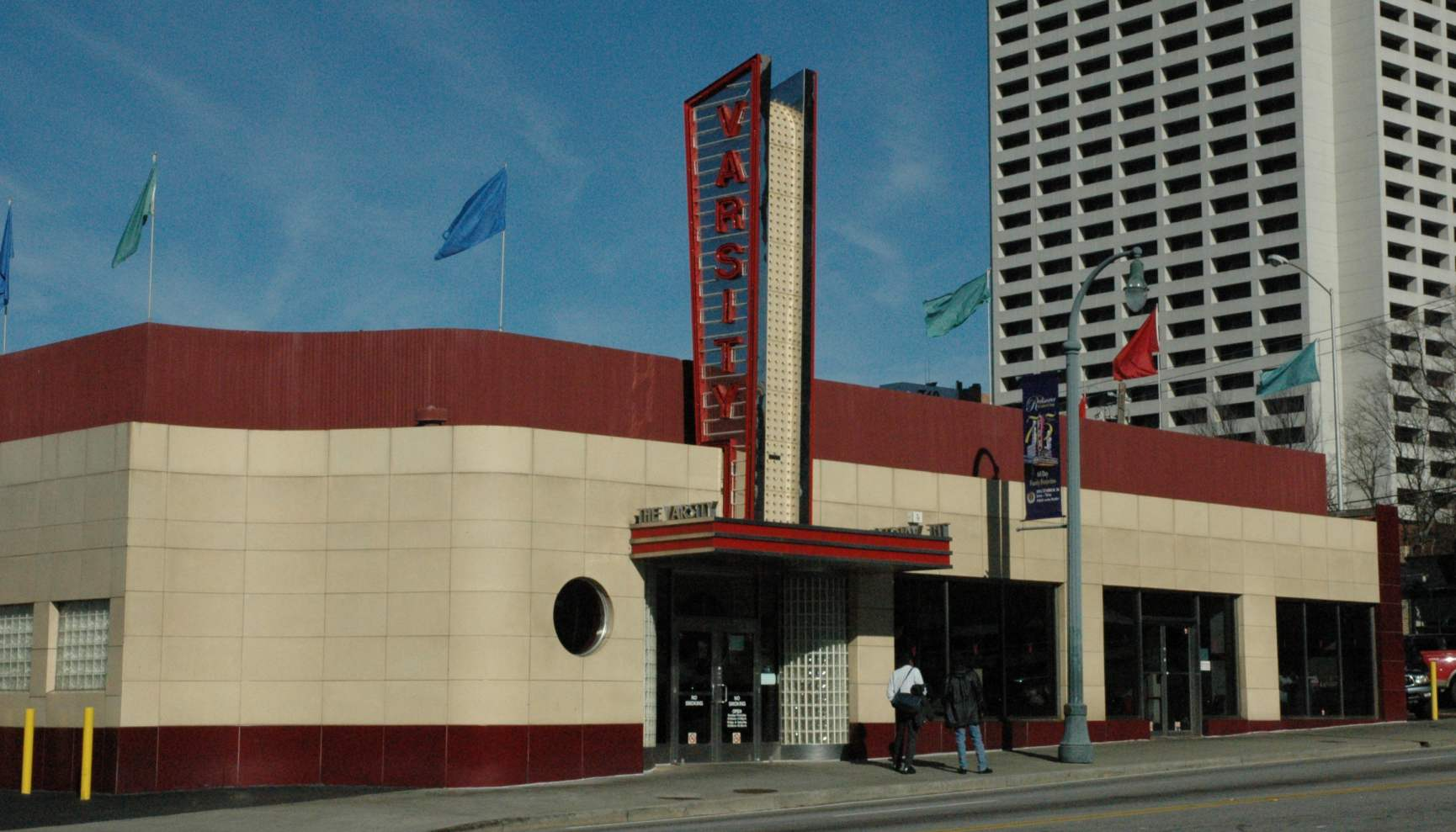
The Varsity

The following is a list of notable restaurants in Atlanta, in the U.S. state of Georgia:

- Ann's Snack Bar
- Antico Pizza
- Atlas
- Avize
- Bacchanalia
- Bread & Butterfly
- The Busy Bee Café
- The Chastain
- Evergreen Butcher and Baker
- Fellini's Pizza
- FLIP Burger Boutique
- Hayakawa
- Junior's Grill
- Lazy Betty
- Mary Mac's Tea Room
- Mellow Mushroom
- Moe's Southwest Grill
- Mrs. Winner's Chicken & Biscuits
- Mujō
- Nàdair
- O by Brush
- Omakase Table
- Roly Poly
- La Semilla
- Shane's Rib Shack
- Staplehouse
- Taco Mac
- The Varsity
- The Vortex Bar & Grill

== See also ==
- List of Michelin-starred restaurants in Atlanta
