= St. Pizza =

Restaurant in New Orleans, Louisiana, U.S.

- Interactive map of St. Pizza

Restaurant information
- Food type: Pizza, Italian-American
- Location: 1152 Magazine Street, New Orleans, Louisiana, 70130, United States
- Coordinates: 29°56′23″N 90°04′15″W
- Website: www.st.pizza

St. Pizza is a pizzeria and tavern located in the Lower Garden District of New Orleans, Louisiana, United States. Known for its East Coast–style thin-crust pizza, the restaurant opened in early 2024 and quickly gained national attention. It was included in The New York Times list of the 22 best pizzerias in the United States in 2024.

== History ==
St. Pizza was founded by Tony Biancosino, Leslie Pariseau, and Abhi Bhansali. Biancosino, a former television producer known for work on Man v. Food and Top Chef, and Pariseau, a journalist and three-time James Beard Award nominee, previously opened the adjacent wine bar Patron Saint in 2023. Bhansali is also co-founder of the New Orleans salad chain City Greens.

The restaurant debuted its walk-up pizza window during Mardi Gras 2024, serving sourdough-based, foldable slices reminiscent of New Jersey and New York pizzerias. Later that year, St. Pizza expanded to include a full-service tavern behind the pizza counter, featuring red-sauce Italian-American dishes and cocktails.

== Menu ==
St. Pizza offers whole pies, slices, and Italian-American classics. Signature pizzas include:

- Upside Down Margherita – mozzarella, pecorino-parm blend, tomato sauce, basil
- Pepperoni – thick-cut cupping pepperoni, mozzarella, tomato sauce
- Bianca – roasted garlic, ricotta, mozzarella, olive oil, basil
- Tomato Pie – tomato sauce, olive oil, oregano (vegan)
- Green Pie – seasonal greens, ricotta, Calabrian chile oil

Other menu items include chicken parmesan, eggplant parmesan, sausage rigatoni, meatballs, salads, and desserts like tiramisu and cookies. The tavern offers cocktails, wine, and beer.

== Reception ==
St. Pizza received critical acclaim shortly after opening. The New York Times named it one of the 22 best pizzerias in the United States in June 2024. Local media praised its East Coast–style slices and cozy tavern atmosphere. Reviewers highlighted dishes such as the Bianca pizza with hot honey drizzle and chicken parmesan.

== Ownership ==
The restaurant is owned by:

- Tony Biancosino – television producer and director
- Leslie Pariseau – journalist, editor, and wine bar owner
- Abhi Bhansali – entrepreneur and co-founder of City Greens

== Awards and recognition ==
- Included in The New York Times list of “22 Best Pizza Places in the United States” (2024)

== See also ==
- List of restaurants in New Orleans
- Pizza in the United States
- Italian-American cuisine
