= The Last Warrior: Kolobok =

- Theatrical release poster
- Directed by: Anton Maslov
- Written by: Vitaly Shlyappo; Anatoly Molchanov; Vasily Kutsenko; Vyacheslav Zub
- Based on: Russian folk tales about Kolobok
- Produced by: Eduard Iloyan; Denis Zhalinsky; Vitaly Shlyappo; Anton Zlatopolsky; Mikhail Tkachenko; Sergey Mayevsky; Irina Vintovkina
- Starring: Garik Kharlamov; Dmitry Zhuravlev; Mila Ershova; Tatyana Dogileva; Elena Podkaminskaya; Dmitry Kolchin; Gosha Kutsenko
- Cinematography: Igor Kiselev
- Edited by: Kirill Abramov; Dmitry Smorchkov
- Production companies: Yellow, Black and White; Russia-1; START Studio; Cinema Fund
- Distributed by: National Media Group Film Distribution
- Release date: August 6, 2026
- Running time: 109 minutes
- Country: Russia
- Language: Russian
- Budget: ₽1 billion
- Box office: ₽1.003 billion

The Last Warrior: Kolobok (Russian: Последний богатырь: Колобок, romanized: Posledniy bogatyr. Kolobok) is a 2026 Russian fantasy adventure comedy film directed by Anton Maslov and produced by the Russian film studio Yellow, Black, and White. It is the fifth film in The Last Warrior franchise, as well as the second prequel and spin-off of the series. It centers on the figure of Kolobok, who first appeared in the second film of the original trilogy, The Last Warrior: Root of Evil. Kolobok is voiced by popular comedian and showman Garik Kharlamov.

The film was released on 6 August 2026, by National Media Group Film Distribution. The release of Kolobok was surrounded by controversy, as Russia's film distributor and Association of Cinema Owners reportedly forced cinemas around the country to focus all efforts on distributing Kolobok, and postpone the highly-anticipated grey release of Spider-Man: Brand New Day, in an apparent attempt to eliminate its expected main competitor at the box office. Moreover, reports surfaced that the Ministry of Education of Russia had ordered mandatory organised screenings for schoolchildren in grades 1–9 across Russia, starting from 1 September 2026 onwards, which the Ministry of Education officially denied on 14 August 2026, saying the film "is successfully attracting viewers' attention even without additional support."

== Plot ==
Kolobok, a lump of dough made of coarse flour, is a thief and a robber. He decides to change his fate and unwittingly becomes the partner of the humble baker Tikhon. Kolobok tries to become human by forcibly taking over the body of the baker, ignoring the baker's displeasure. Multiple characters appear to experience an identity crisis, as they are puzzled by the question who they really are, and who they want to become. In the magical world of Kolobok, bandits have seized power, doing whatever they please, while nobody can stand up to them. While Kolobok is a head without a body (a strong will without means), Tikhon is a body without a "head" (a person who lacks the courage and determination to make his way in life); upon merging into one at the end of the story, they finally make each other complete. The other characters remain what they were and find themselves content with that.

== Cast ==
- Garik Kharlamov as Kolobok (voice), a living loaf of bread who began to commit robbery in the forest after running away from his parents. But after meeting Ivan Naidenov/Muromets and Tikhon in his solo film, he switched to the side of good and began helping defend Belogorye (English: Belogorie).
- Dmitry Zhuravlev as Tikhon, a cowardly baker who is forever plagued by misfortune. By fate, he becomes the companion of Kolobok, the living loaf of bread.
- Mila Ershova as Lada, a young girl who helps Kolobok and Tikhon break free from their curse. She is the owner of the Light Mirror.
- Tatyana Dogileva as the Light Mirror, a magic mirror that doesn't have the answer to everything, but is ready to suggest or assist in any matter.
- Elena Podkaminskaya as the All-Seeing Mirror, a magic mirror that knows the answers to all questions. She grants Kolobok the ability to inhabit other people's bodies.
- Dmitry Kolchin as Bear Hedgehog (voice), a giant, bear-sized hedgehog. He lives in his underground home. In the film, Kolobok, Tikhon, and Lada fall through the roof to reach him.
- Gosha Kutsenko as Vlas / The Wolf, the main antagonist and a bandit pursuing Kolobok and his companion Tikhon. He is a member and leader of the bandit gang.
- Timofey Zaytsev as Soplo (English: Nozzle), two robbers who help the Wolf rob ordinary people. They are members of the "Pack" bandit group.
- Denis Meleshko as Siplo (English: Hoarsely), two robbers
- Igor Bogomyakov as a Tall man
- Daria Blokhina as Athena
- Kirill Zaytsev as Finist (cameo)
- Alexandra Golubkova as The Mirror

== Production ==
In May 2025, the film company Yellow, Black and White announced a film about Kolobok as a spin-off of the The Last Warrior franchise. Anton Maslov, who previously worked on the series The Last Warrior: Legacy, was appointed director, and Garik Kharlamov returned to voice the title character. The screenplay was written by Vitaly Shlyappo, Anatoly Molchanov, Vasily Kutsenko, and Vyacheslav Zub, who previously worked on the scripts for the series The Last Warrior: Legacy and the film Finist. The First Warrior. Shlyappo and Kutsenko also worked on the scripts for the films in the original trilogy. Igor Kiselev was appointed cinematographer.

=== Filming ===
Principal photography began in the summer of 2025 in Moscow. Filming took place in the capital's soundstages, capturing the fairytale world of Belogorye and new locations never before seen in the The Last Warrior universe: the Wolf's Lair, Ilya Muromets's Treasure, and the Cave of Magic Mirrors.

In August 2025, the film crew arrived in the Altai Republic. In search of filming locations, the Kolobok crew traveled approximately 35,000 km, reaching the Mongolian border and covering key locations in the republic: the villages of Murkut, Inegen, and Ulagan, Lake Teletskoye, the Mazhoi Cascade, and the Seminsky Pass. According to director Anton Maslov, it was the power of nature that gave the film an energy that could not be recreated on a sound stage. He explained that the team strove to transform the locations from mere backdrops into part of the story. Filming concluded in November 2025.

== Reception ==
=== Release ===
In mid-July 2026, Russia's film distributor Atmosfera Kino ("Atmosphere of Cinema") and the Russian Association of Cinema Owners jointly sent letters to cinemas demanding to postpone the release of Spider-Man: Brand New Day (scheduled for 6 August, after the world premiere was set to take place on 29 July) until the end of August, threatening sanctions if the cinemas did not comply. In separate letters, they demanded that all cinemas in Russia focused their efforts on the successful distribution of The Last Knight: Kolobok instead. Therefore, even before its release, the film received widespread low ratings due to the postponement of unofficial screenings of Spider-Man: Brand New Day in Russia, the official premiere of which in other CIS countries was scheduled for 6 August, the same day as Kolobok. As a result, cinemas remained nearly empty during the film's screening on the day of its premiere. Director Anton Maslov publicly confronted a critic of the film, publishing personal photos of the critic with obscene comments. The film's creators reportedly received threats from critics; in response, television channel Rossiya 24 complained to the prosecutor’s office and the Investigative Committee about the critics, and investigators opened a criminal case against the critics. The film critics charged reportedly faced up to 5 years in prison if convicted.

In Belarus, the film, based on the script of Belarusian screenwriter Vitaly Shlyapo, was initially scheduled for release simultaneous with Russia in the first week of August 2026, but it unexpectedly disappeared from online posters and lists of upcoming premieres. By 8 August, it had still not been approved for release by the Ministry of Culture of Belarus.

On 7 August, the Luch cinema in Krasnoyarsk announced it would not screen Kolobok, as the film did not meet the cinema's quality standards, was unsuited for children aged 6 and older, and would likely be screening at losses that could not be financially justified. Residents of Krasnoyarsk fully supported the cinema's decision, while other cinemas were in doubt, as screening (foreign) films other than Kolobok (such as Spider-Man) could get them into trouble, while Kolobok only attracted half-empty rooms in most regions that would not cover their operating costs.

As a result of possible review bombing, the film's average rating on the international platform IMDb dropped to a minimum of 1.0 out of 10 by 8 August 2026. Journalists from Rotonda reported that Kolobok was screened repeatedly, multiple times a day, in dozens of cinemas in Saint Petersburg, but increasingly, many of them remained completely empty from 7 to 10 August 2026. Rotonda reported that for at least five screenings on 7 August, not a single ticket was sold; this grew to 20 completely empty screenings on 9 August, and 28 empty screenings on 10 August. Yet, the cinemas continued screening Kolobok (with Cinema Park Grand Canyon scheduling 26 screenings of Kolobok from morning to evening), even when zero tickets had been sold, for fear of losing their access to other popular films. According to official figures as of 9 August, the film had been seen by almost 565,000 people (paying 430 rubles per ticket), and grossed about 245 million rubles, meaning that there had been an average of 15 viewers per screening during its first weekend.

=== Critical reception ===
On premiere day, a blogger posted a photo of an empty cinema, commenting that film contains plenty of lines that, for example, Spider-Man would never utter in front of children, "but Kolobok is mostly young and rosy-cheeked." Garik Kharlamov, who voiced the main character Kobolok, surprisingly remarked in response to the controversy that he personally preferred Batman, but that Kolobok turned out to be ‘not bad’: "No matter how much you shouted, before even seeing the film, that it was crap, it turned out to be good and funny. Both children and adults will enjoy it."

Philologist and film critic Artyom Gasparov told Kommersant on 7 August 2026 that the film did not live up to its 6+ rating: "This isn't a children's fairy tale, nor is it a family blockbuster. It's something between a parody with elements of black humour and a postmodern sketch show, which attempts to entertain the audience with jokes that are, in certain places, rather vulgar."

Critics complained that the graphics of the film were sometimes "terrible", especially the face of Kolobok (a mixture of computer graphics and the facial expressions of Russian comedian Garik Kharlamov, who voices Kolobok), resulting in "a gloomy face that is more frightening than joyful, and Kolobok's monstrosity is one of the main complaints about this film." The treatment of girls and women in the story was also frequently criticised, particularly the girl Lada, who is called a "monster" in the film itself, and sees herself as ugly in the mirror. A reviewer remarked: "The epithets directed at her are incredibly crude." Kolobok once tries to force a kiss on Lada, another time suggestively pours kvass into his trousers in her presence, and constantly makes jokes at the expense of бабы (baby, roughly meaning "broads", a derogatory term for women). Lifehacker argued: "Essentially, if you remove Kolobok from the plot, the story would work just as well": the main character just gets in the way, with jokes that may initially be funny, but become increasingly obnoxious, repetitive and disruptive as the plot moves forward, concluding "most of the jokes are stupid and vulgar", irritating, embarrassing, and not meant for children at all, ruining the film's arguable main message about self-acceptance.

According to NeMoskva, the protagonist Kolobok "exhibits similar aggression" to the filmmakers who publicly harassed and sued their critics, "is often rude and makes vulgar jokes that are not appropriate for children." Kolobok usually resolves any conflict through force and fighting rather than talking, and the first fight in the film takes place to the sound of a song.

=== Mandatory screenings controversy ===
On 10 August 2026, educational website Densus.ru reported that the Ministry of Education of Russia had ordered organised mandatory screenings of Kolobok for schoolchildren in grades 1–9 across Russia, starting from 1 September 2026 onwards. It paraphrased former Deputy Minister of Education Tatyana Viktorovna Vasilyeva as saying that the film is "not merely entertainment", but a modern interpretation of a Russian folk tale, "helping children to come to terms with important moral concepts—such as friendship, courage and the ability to stand up to evil through familiar characters."

On 14 August, independent Russian news service Verstka reported that schoolchildren were being bused en masse to watch Kolobok in cinemas on the basis of over 20 posts on social media making such claims, including photos of entire classes next to film posters of Kolobok at cinemas. Verstka noticed that the reviews posted by various school institutions along with the photos had very similar wordings, and actively praised the film, as if being instructed to do so. The same day, the Russian Ministry of Education issued a statement denying that it had ordered mandatory organised screenings for schoolchildren, calling all such claims "fake", and declared that the film "is successfully attracting viewers' attention even without additional support."
