= Jason Liang (chef) =

Taiwanese-American Michelin star chef

Jason Liang is a Taiwanese-American chef and James Beard Foundation Award semifinalist based in Atlanta, Georgia. He is the chef behind O by Brush, a Michelin-starred restaurant.

== Personal life ==
Liang was born in South Carolina. He grew up in Taiwan but moved back to the United States in 2006. Liang's wife and business partner is ChingYao Wang, a pastry chef who bakes pastries for many of their restaurants. Liang and Wang first met during their internship at the Regent Taipei in Taipei, Taiwan.

== Career ==
After moving back to the United States in 2006, Liang worked as a sushi chef at One Sushi Plus in Brookhaven and later at Craft Izakaya in Krog Street Market.

In April 2016, Jason opened his own restaurant located in Decatur called Brush Sushi Izakaya with business partner John Chen. In 2017, Liang was named as one of StarChef's Rising Stars for his work at Brush Sushi Izakaya. In 2018, Liang opened another restaurant, Momonoki ("peach tree"), in Midtown Atlanta, which specialized in tsukemen.

In 2022, Liang was a semifinalist for the James Beard Foundation Award – Best Chef: Southeast (GA, KY, NC, SC, TN, WV), for Brush sushi Izakaya. Later that year, Liang and his business partner John Chen closed their restaurant Brush Sushi Izakaya; however, in 2023, they reopened Brush, now O by Brush, in Buckhead Village, Atlanta.

In October 2024, O by Brush was awarded a Michelin Guide star for its dry-aged fish omakase program. In that same year, Liang's other restaurant Lucky Star, a Taiwanese cafe and cocktail bar located in West Midtown that opened on December 6, 2024, was added to the Michelin recommended list.

In March 2025, Liang opened a sushi-style hand roll restaurant located in Dunwoody, Georgia called Cuddlefish with his business partner John Chen. Before the 2025 opening of Cuddlefish, Liang and Chen had operated a previous restaurant called Cuddlefish in 2022 after briefly closing Brush but then closed Cuddlefish in 2023 to refocus on Brush.

In November 2025, Liang's restaurant O by Brush retained its Michelin Guide star status.
