= Roly poly =

Roly poly or Roly Poly may refer to:

- An isopod crustacean of the family Armadillidiidae, also known as a pill bug
- A pill millipede (unrelated to the pill bug)
- Syzygium alliiligneum, a plant from Queensland, Australia
- Roly-poly toy, a toy that rights itself when pushed over
- Jam roly-poly, a traditional British pudding
- Roly Poly (sandwich store chain), a chain of sandwich shops in the United States
- "Roly Poly" (Bob Wills song)
- "Roly-Poly" (T-ara song)
- Roly-Poly (game), an ancestor of Roulette
- Roly Poly (horse), thoroughbred racehorse
- Roly-Poly Bird, a character in children’s stories by Roald Dahl
- Roly Poly Man, a close associate of the Hurdy Gurdy Man in the 1968 song by Donovan
- A forward roll, a gymnastic maneuver
- Roly Poly, a translation of the title of Przekładaniec, a 1968 Polish film by Andrzej Wajda
- Roly Poly, a 1969 TV episode of Thirty-Minute Theatre by BBC Television
- Roly Polys, a dancing group of fat ladies promoted by British comedian Les Dawson
- Rolypolys, a group of characters made for a series of edutainment video games by Japanese artist Osamu Sato
- Wayne Shaw (footballer), English footballer nicknamed the Roly Poly Goalie

== See also ==
- The Tale of Samuel Whiskers or The Roly-Poly Pudding, a book by Beatrix Potter
- Rolie Polie Olie, a cartoon character created by William Joyce
- Rolly (disambiguation)
