= Zeeland Street =

Restaurant in Baton Rouge, Louisiana, U.S.

- Interactive map of Zeeland Street

Restaurant information
- Established: 1992
- Owner: Stephanie Phares
- Chef: Stephanie Phares
- Food type: Southern; Soul food; American; Breakfast; Plate lunch
- Location: 2031 Perkins Road, Baton Rouge, Louisiana, 70808, United States
- Coordinates: 30°25′51″N 91°09′39″W
- Website: www.zeelandstreet.com

Zeeland Street is a restaurant in Baton Rouge, Louisiana, United States. It was founded by Stephanie Phares and her then-husband in 1992 after the couple bought a former convenience store at the corner of Zeeland Avenue and Perkins Road. In 2024, The New York Times included Zeeland Street in its annual list of 50 restaurants in the United States.

== History ==
Stephanie Phares moved to Baton Rouge in the early 1990s and began hosting neighborhood potlucks on Zeeland Avenue where she shared recipes that she learned from her grandmother, leading to creation of the restaurant.

In 1992, Phares and her then-husband bought a former convenience store at the corner of Zeeland Avenue and Perkins Road, naming it the Zeeland Street Market, and began serving meals. The restaurant later dropped "Market" from its name.

== Recognition ==
In 2024, The New York Times included Zeeland Street in The Restaurant List, its annual list of 50 restaurants in the United States. Zeeland Street was one of two Louisiana restaurants included on the 2024 list, along with Acamaya in New Orleans.

Zeeland Street was voted Best Black-owned Restaurant in the 2025 Best of 225 Awards.

== See also ==
- Cuisine of Louisiana
- Soul food
