= Acamaya =

Restaurant in New Orleans, Louisiana, U.S.

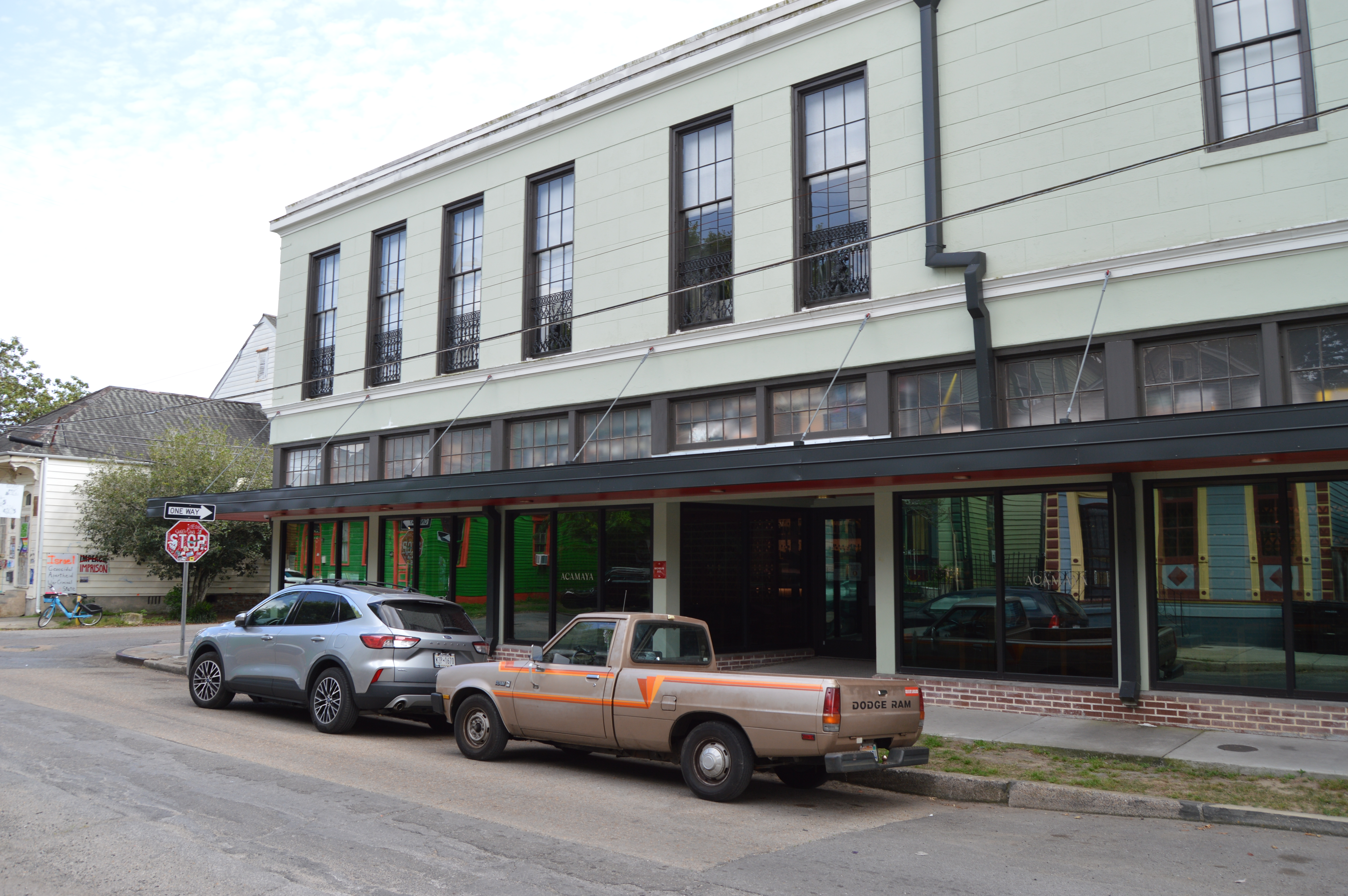
- Interactive map of Acamaya

Restaurant information
- Owners: Ana Castro; Lydia Castro
- Location: 3070 Dauphine Street, New Orleans, Louisiana, 70117, United States
- Coordinates: 29°57′52″N 90°02′45″W
- Website: acamayanola.com

Acamaya is a Mexican seafood restaurant in New Orleans, Louisiana. It is owned by chef Ana Castro, who previously worked at the restaurant Lengua Madre, and her sister Lydia.

== Description ==
The restaurant focuses on a type of Mexican seafood, mariscos, served hot or cold. The name of the restaurant comes from the Spanish word acamaya, for a type of "crustacean similar to a crawfish". Despite the name, there is no crawfish on the restaurant's menu. There is a glossary on the back of the restaurant's menu for food terms that are used in dishes.

Architecture firm Farouki Farouki designed the restaurant's interior spaces. The restaurant is heavily inspired by Mexico City, which is the hometown of the Castro sisters. Ana Castro lives above the restaurant in order to better receive deliveries of shrimp from her "shrimp guy", who arrives exclusively between 5:00 and 6:30 a.m.

== Awards ==
The restaurant was named by The New York Times in September 2024 as one of the 50 best restaurants in the United States, alongside Baton Rouge restaurant Zeeland Street. Ana Castro was named as a semifinalist in the 2025 James Beard Awards.

== See also ==
- List of restaurants in New Orleans
- List of Michelin Bib Gourmand restaurants in the United States
