= Ayu Bakehouse =

Bakery in New Orleans, Louisiana, U.S.

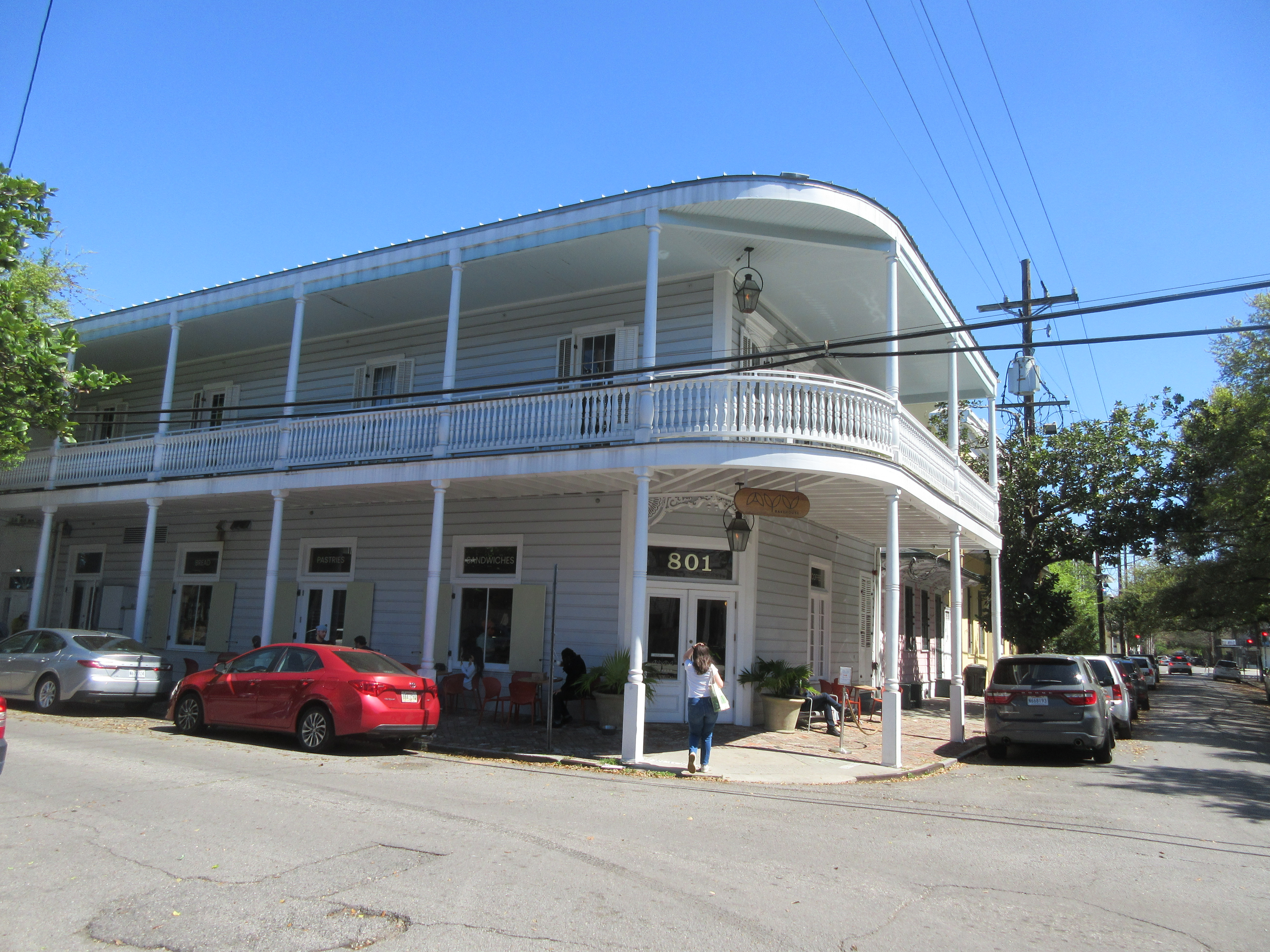
- Interactive map of Ayu Bakehouse

Restaurant information
- Location: 801 Frenchmen Street, New Orleans, Louisiana, 70117, United States
- Coordinates: 29°57′56″N 90°03′28″W
- Website: ayubakehouse.com

Ayu Bakehouse is a bakery in New Orleans, Louisiana. It opened in 2022. Kelly Jacques and Samantha Weiss are co-owners. The bakery serves king cake.

== See also ==
- List of bakeries
- List of restaurants in New Orleans
