= Vern's =

Restaurant in Charleston, South Carolina, U.S.

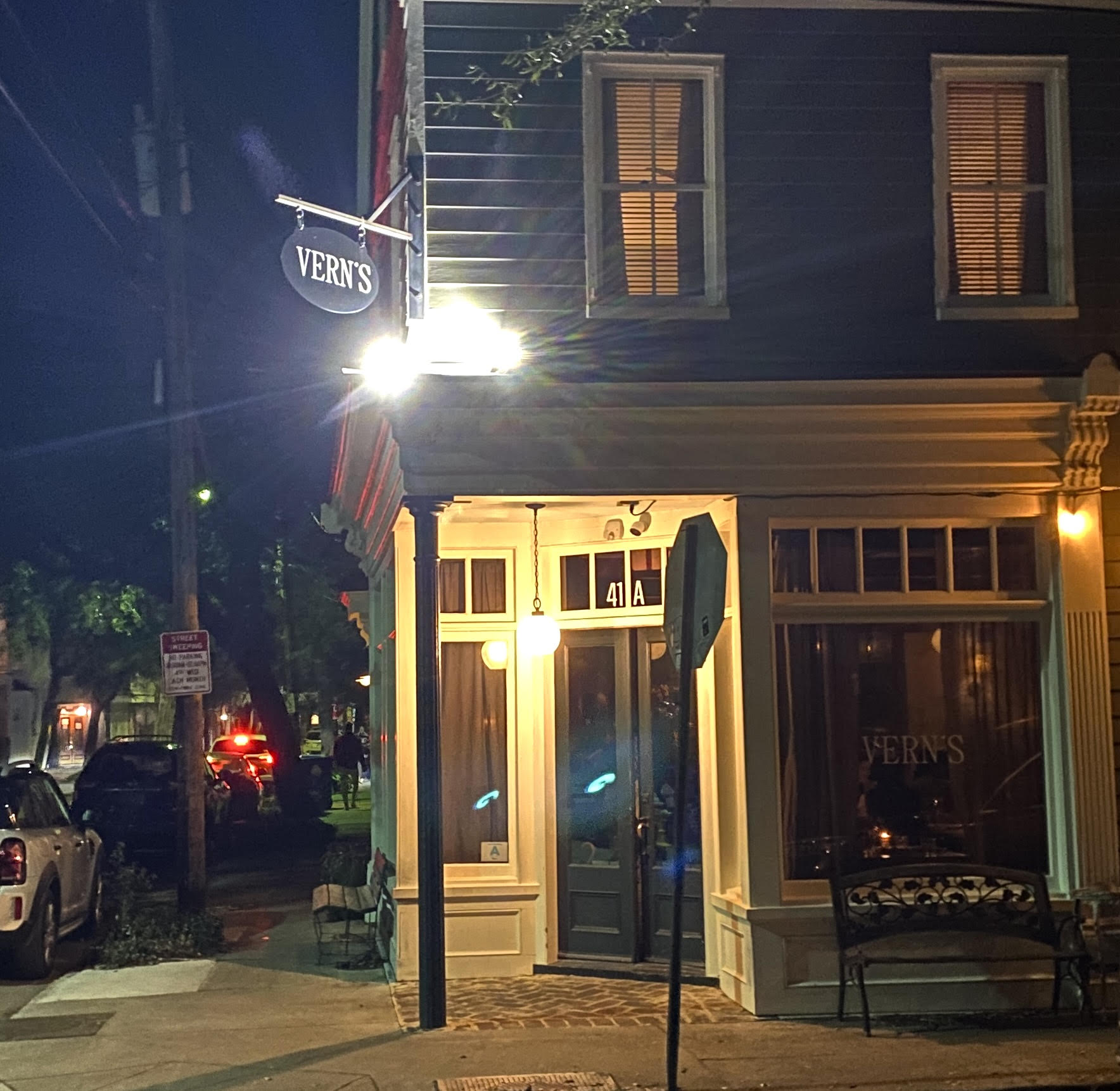
- Interactive map of Vern's

Restaurant information
- Location: 41 Bogard Street, Charleston, South Carolina, 29403, United States
- Coordinates: 32°47′32.5″N 79°56′44.5″W

Vern's is a restaurant in Charleston, South Carolina. Established in July 2022, the business was included in The New York Times's 2023 list of the 50 best restaurants in the United States. In November 2025, the restaurant was awarded a Michelin star.

== See also ==
- List of Michelin-starred restaurants in the American South
