= Evergreen Butcher and Baker =

Restaurant in Atlanta, Georgia, U.S.

Coordinates: 33°45′3.5″N 84°19′18.4″W

- Interactive map of Evergreen Butcher and Baker

Restaurant information
- Location: Atlanta, Georgia, United States

Evergreen Butcher and Baker is a bakery and restaurant in Atlanta, Georgia, United States. In 2024, the business was included in The New York Times's list of the 22 best bakeries in the U.S.

== See also ==
- List of bakeries
- List of restaurants in Atlanta
