= Nàdair =

Restaurant in Atlanta, Georgia, U.S.

- Interactive map of Nàdair

Restaurant information
- Location: 1123 Zonolite Rd. NE, Atlanta, Georgia, 30306, United States
- Coordinates: 33.8062°N 84.3438°W

Nàdair is a restaurant in Atlanta, Georgia. It was included in The New York Times's 2024 list of the 50 best restaurants in the United States.

== See also ==
- List of restaurants in Atlanta
