= Saint-Germain (restaurant) =

Restaurant in New Orleans, Louisiana, U.S.

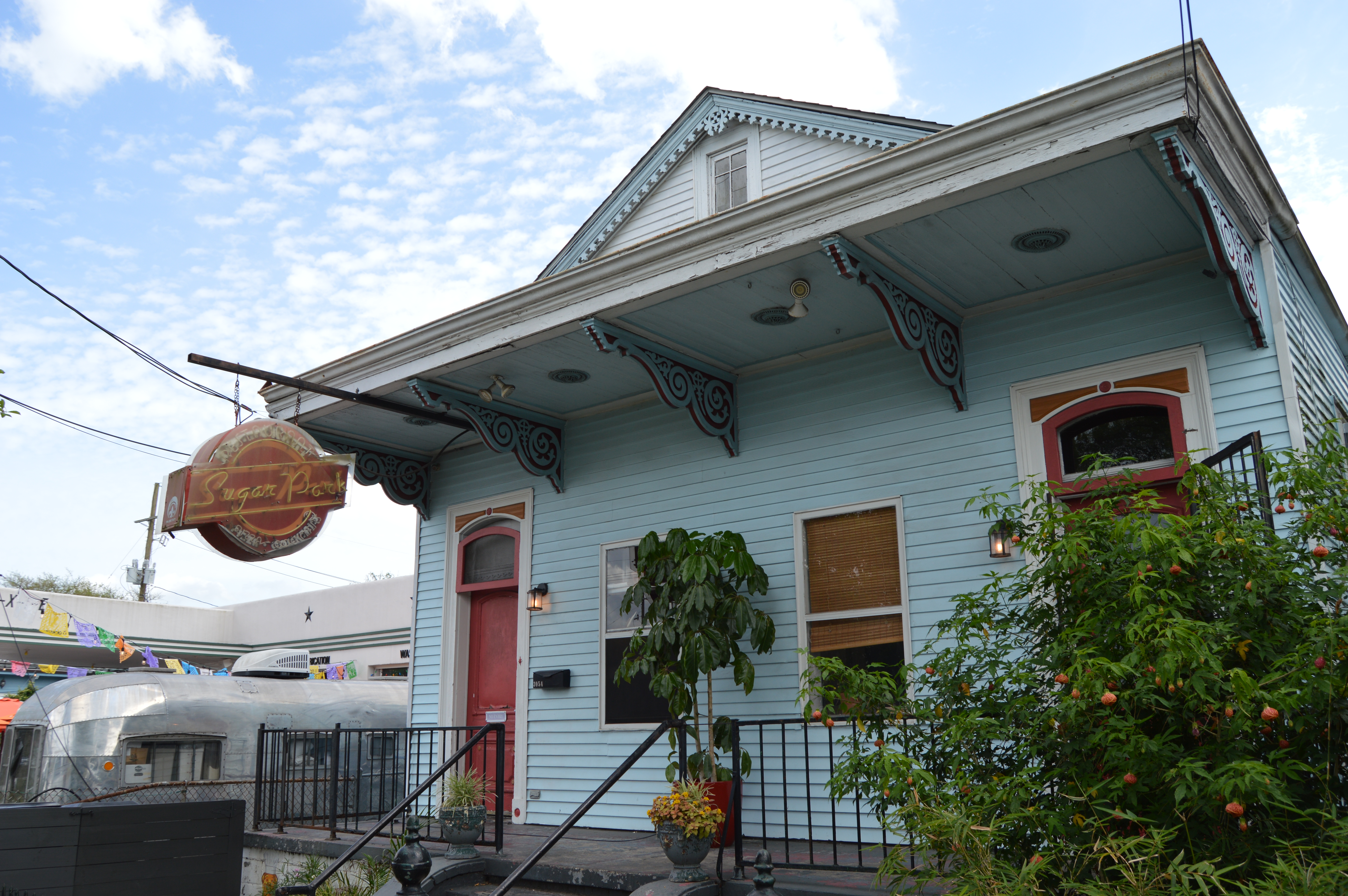
- Interactive map of Saint-Germain

Restaurant information
- Head chef: Trey Smith, Blake Aguillard
- Location: New Orleans, Louisiana, United States
- Coordinates: retion:US-LA 29°58′03″N 90°02′41″W

Saint-Germain is a Michelin-starred restaurant in New Orleans, Louisiana, United States.

== See also ==
- List of Michelin-starred restaurants in the American South
- List of restaurants in New Orleans
