= Lazy Betty =

Restaurant in Atlanta, Georgia, U.S.

- Interactive map of Lazy Betty

Restaurant information
- Food type: American; New American
- Location: 999 Peachtree St, Atlanta, Georgia, 30309, United States
- Coordinates: 33°45′46″N 84°20′15″W
- Website: lazybettyatl.com

Lazy Betty is a restaurant in Midtown Atlanta, Georgia. The restaurant received a Michelin star in 2023, 2024, and 2025.

== Description ==
The restaurant serves American / New American cuisine.

== Reception ==
Condé Nast Traveler says the restaurant's menu is "creative without being confusing, and technical while still tasty".

== See also ==
- List of Michelin starred restaurants in Atlanta
- List of New American restaurants
- List of restaurants in Atlanta
