= Locust (restaurant) =

Restaurant in Nashville, Tennessee, U.S.

- Interactive map of Locust

Restaurant information
- Head chef: Trevor Moran
- Food type: Japanese-influence Contemporary
- Rating: (Michelin Guide)
- Location: 2305 12th Ave., Nashville, Tennessee, 37204, United States
- Coordinates: 36.1274°N 86.7894°W
- Website: www.locustnashville.com

Locust is a Michelin-starred restaurant in Nashville, Tennessee, United States.

== See also ==
- List of Michelin-starred restaurants in the American South
