= Jean Cocteau Museum =

France dedicated to artist Jean Cocteau

- Musée Jean Cocteau collection Séverin Wunderman
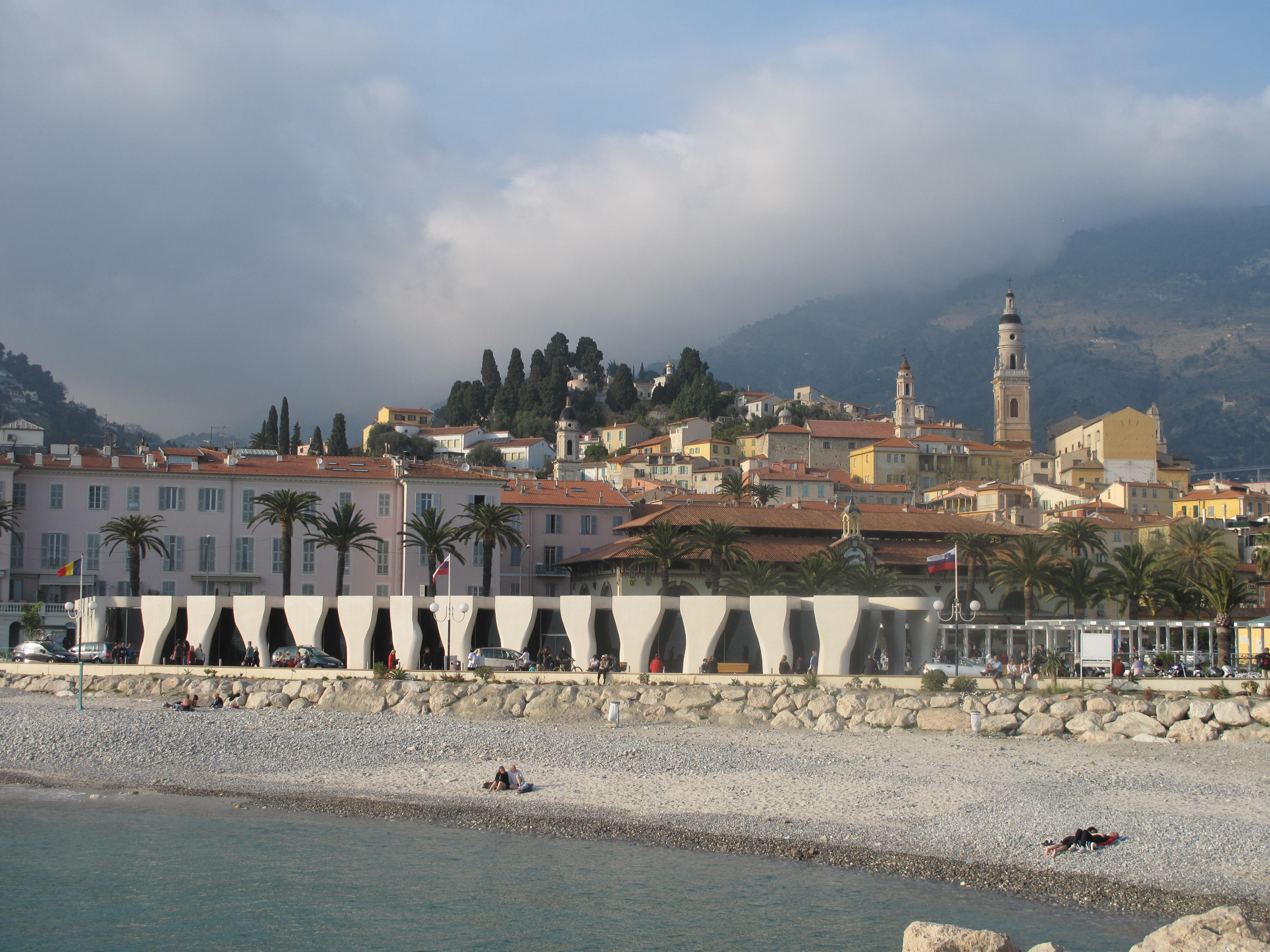
- The Jean Cocteau Museum on the beach at Menton
- Established: November 6, 2011
- Location: Menton, Alpes-Maritimes, France
- Coordinates: 43°46′29″N 7°30′21″E
- Type: Modern art
- Director: Françoise Leonelli
- Website: museecocteaumenton.fr

The Jean Cocteau Museum/Séverin Wunderman Collection is a museum in Menton, on the French Riviera, in the Alpes-Maritimes department. Dedicated to the French artist Jean Cocteau, it incorporates the collection of American businessman and Cocteau enthusiast Séverin Wunderman.

== Design ==
The decision to create the museum was made by the Menton city council in December 2003. An international competition was held by the council in 2007, with a winner for the design of the museum announced in June 2008. The foundation stone was laid in December 2008, with the shell completed in January 2011. The competition to design the museum building was won by French architect Rudy Ricciotti, an exponent of 'hedonist architecture' in the 1980s. Ricciotti had previously designed the new Islamic art wing at the Louvre, among other cultural commissions. Ricciotti's design was directly inspired by Cocteau's life and work, he has said of the museum's design that "Black and white no longer serve as colours here...they create an interplay of structural forces calling to mind both the artist’s works on paper and the poet’s personality, his zones of light and darkness, his enigmatic self-mythology fueled by contrasts." The distinctive facade of the building has been variously described as "...like a fierce set of teeth or a string of alabaster forearms holding up the sky" and "...like a spider, with jagged black pillars sprawling leg-like over the building".

Among the financial backers of the museum was Pierre Bergé, partner of the late Yves Saint Laurent. The museum took eight years to create, and is 29,000 sq ft in size.

== Collection ==
Divided into seven parts, the museum contains almost 1000 graphic works by Cocteau, with the majority of the collection from collector Severin Wunderman. Wunderman was 19 when he began collecting works by Cocteau. He had offered his collection to the University of Texas, but later withdrew the offer, keeping his collection in his own Cocteau museum in Irvine, California, which he dedicated in 1985. He would frequently lend pieces to exhibitions and shows.

The scope of the collection spans early avant-garde graphic works with pencil, pastel, and watercolours on paper, to his films, with extensive clips from his "Orphic Trilogy". As well as Cocteau's work, the museum contains a collection of 240 original photographic prints by Lucien Clergue relating to the work of Cocteau, mostly taken during the filming of Testament of Orpheus.

The work Cocteau left upon his death in 1963 was catalogued by Annie Guédras, who identified at least three dozen fakes and copies among the pieces, some of which were destined for Wunderman's donation to the museum. The museum did eventually withdraw the works in question. Guédras later felt that she was excluded from the Cocteau Committee that created the museum in the early 2000s because of her discovery.

A documentation centre for Cocteau's work is based at the museum, which contains books, magazines, journals, catalogues, and monographs on Cocteau. An Office of Graphic Art at the museum conserves the collection when not on display. The museum also features a cafe, shop, and spaces to hire.

On July 11, 2025, the Wunderman Foundation, representing the donator's family, sent a formal notice to the Menton town council asking for the 1,800 donated works t be returned, arguing that the conditions fixed at the time of the donation had not been respected.

== Jean Cocteau and Menton ==
From 1950 onwards, Jean Cocteau was a frequent guest at Francine Weisweiller's villa Santo Sospir in Saint-Jean-Cap-Ferrat on the French Riviera. In 1955, he was invited to attend the Classical Music Festival in nearby Menton. Delighted by the experience, he developed an attachment to the town and befriended the mayor, who suggested he decorate the town's wedding hall. In recognition of this work, which Cocteau accomplished in 1957 and 1958, Menton declared him an honorary citizen. The Cocteau hall remains to this day a popular venue for weddings in the town.

In September 1957, the mayor of Menton also offered Cocteau to create a museum in the Bastion, a then disused 17th century fort situated near the harbor. Enthusiastic about the project, the artist worked on rearranging and decorating the building in his last years, as well as selecting the pieces he wanted exhibited there. The Bastion museum opened to the public in 1966, three years after Cocteau's death.

== Temporary closure ==
On the night between 29 and 30 October 2018, a severe storm hit the Menton region. The museum, which is around 50 metres away from the shore, was hit by waves and its basement was flooded. The museum's management (Menton's city council) had decided to store a number of works in the basement. Those works were damaged by seawater, and the ground floor was also partially flooded. As a result of the storm, management decided to shut down the museum until further notice in order to allow for restoration of the damaged works at several locations throughout France. As of mid-April 2019, the museum was still closed "for repairs (travaux)" and Menton's tourist office informally stated that the museum might remain closed until autumn 2019, although no official expected date of reopening has ever been specified by Menton's municipality. In the meantime, a partial exhibition has been set up at the Bastion Museum. Menton's Bastion is a small fort built in 1619 overlooking the Mediterranean Sea; it withstood the October 2018 storm and subsequent floods.

As of August 2022, Menton's city council remains surprisingly silent on the possible reopening of the museum. The museum remains closed and looks completely abandoned with no sign of future evolution. In October 2022, Menton's municipality will mark the 4th anniversary of the museum's "temporary" closure.

UPDATE. The museum has relocated some of their collection to Le Bastion: CURRENT EXHIBITION LE CHÂTEAU DES MYSTÈRES FROM JULY 8 TO NOVEMBER 13, 2023 AT THE BASTION MUSÉE and La Salle des Mariage https://www.francetraveltips.com/menton-salle-des-mariages-jean-cocteau/

== See also ==
- Bastion Museum, its sister museum in Menton created by Jean Cocteau, opened in 1966.
