= O by Brush =

Restaurant in Atlanta, Georgia, U.S.

- Interactive map of O by Brush

Restaurant information
- Head chef: Jason Liang
- Food type: Omakase
- Rating: (Michelin Guide)
- Location: 3009 Peachtree Road NE, Atlanta, Georgia, 30305, United States
- Coordinates: 33°50′14.7″N 84°22′51.3″W
- Website: obybrush.com

O by Brush is an Omakase restaurant in the Buckhead neighborhood of Atlanta, in the U.S. state of Georgia. It is run by chef Jason Liang.

== See also ==
- List of Michelin-starred restaurants in Atlanta
- List of restaurants in Atlanta
