= Staplehouse =

Restaurant in Atlanta, Georgia, U.S.

Coordinates: 33°45′15.0″N 84°22′11.6″W

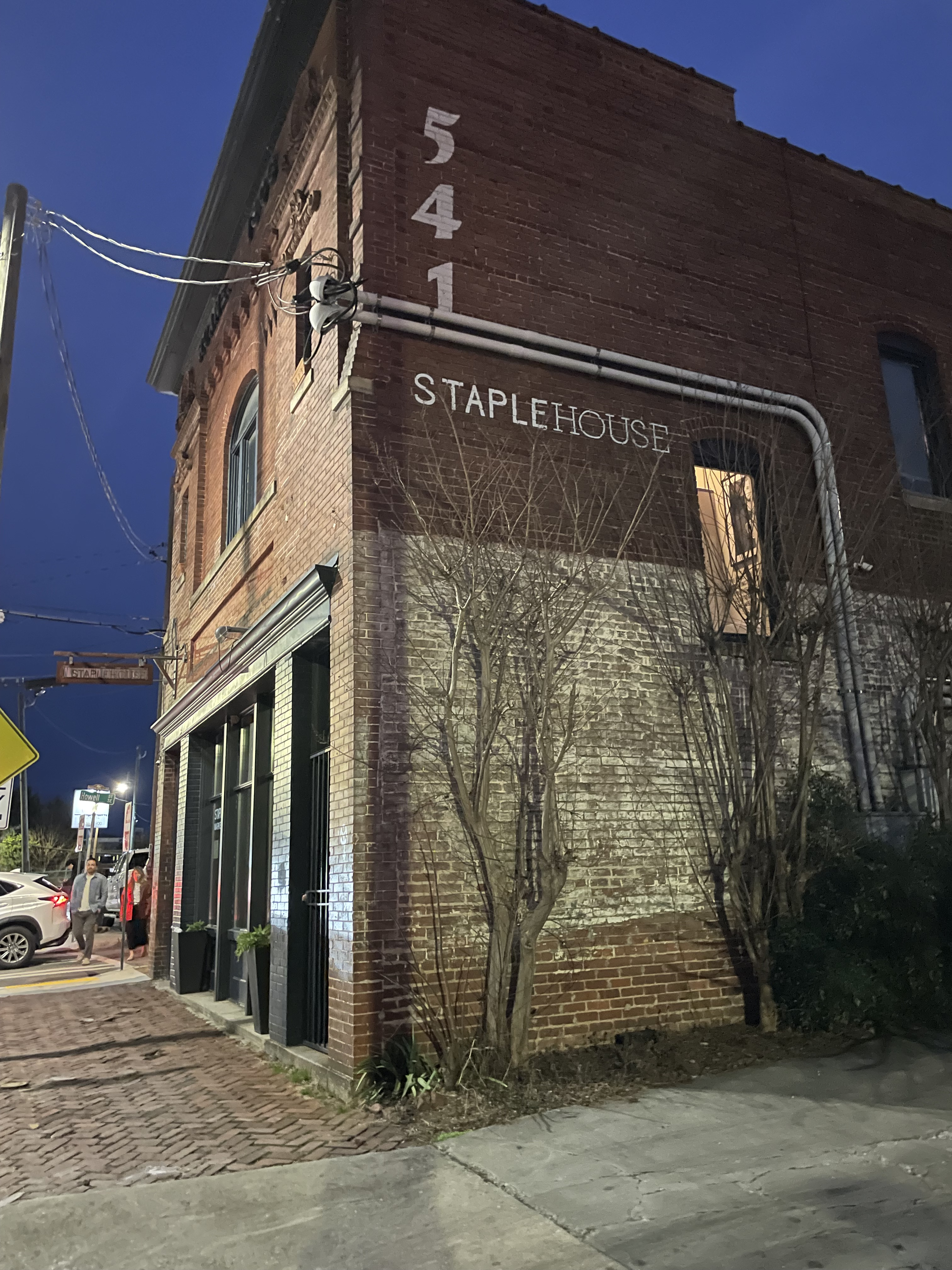
- Interactive map of Staplehouse

Restaurant information
- Managers: Jen Hidinger; Kara Hidinger
- Head chef: Ryan Smith
- Chef: Ryan Smith
- Location: 541 Edgewood Avenue SE, Atlanta, Georgia, 30312, United States
- Reservations: Yes
- Website: www.staplehouse.com

Staplehouse is a restaurant in Atlanta, Georgia, United States. The restaurant received a Michelin star in 2024, though they lost it the next year in 2025 because they stopped offering their dinner tasting menu.

== Description ==
Staplehouse serves a prix fixe menu; dishes include a meatball sub and bamboo barigoule. The restaurant has a walk-up service counter, and reservations are required.

== Reception ==
Staplehouse received one Michelin star, denoting "high-quality cooking". A review in The Infatuation noted the restaurant's "cheery" courtyard, praising Staplehouse's family-friendly nature.

== See also ==
- List of Michelin-starred restaurants in Atlanta
- List of restaurants in Atlanta
