= Counter (restaurant) =

Restaurant in Charlotte, North Carolina, U.S.

counter-
- Interactive map of counter-

Restaurant information
- Owner: Sam Hart
- Head chef: Sam Hart
- Rating: (Michelin Guide)
- Location: 2001 West Morehead Street, Charlotte, North Carolina, United States
- Coordinates: 35.2275°N 80.8737°W
- Website: counterclt.com

Counter (stylized as counter-) is a Michelin-starred restaurant in Charlotte, North Carolina, United States. It is the first restaurant in the state of North Carolina to receive a Michelin honor. The restaurant was also awarded the Michelin Green Star, an award for restaurants with sustainable practices, in 2025.

== History ==
counter- opened on September 9, 2020 in the Wesley Heights area in Charlotte, North Carolina. It has since relocated twice, in 2022 and 2023, to fit growing space demands. counter- had two sister concept restaurants; Archive, a traditional dining restaurant featuring dishes from past counter- menus, and Biblio, a wine-centered restaurant that paired patrons' dishes based on their glass. Both sister restaurants have closed as of 2024. In May 2025, counter- received its Level 3 certification from the Green Restaurants Association.

In November 2025, upon the publication of the Michelin Guide for the American South, counter- was announced as one of 19 restaurants to receive a Michelin star, and the first and only restaurant in North Carolina to receive a Michelin star. Honoring counter- in its publication, Michelin inspectors commented:

"To say that Counter is an outlier in the Charlotte dining scene risks understatement: this ambitious, mercurial project from Chef Sam Hart is sui generis. The boldly immersive experience features shifting concepts fueled by Chef Hart’s multifarious passions and creativity, drawing on themes of nostalgia, music, personal history and more on a multicourse tasting menu. Local products are celebrated, including herbs and vegetables from nearby urban farms, combined with wide-ranging culinary influences that make for a truly memorable meal. The tight-knit team provides effortlessly gracious hospitality, and the beverage offerings are sure to impress."

== Concept ==
In its first iteration, counter- created its menus around music, theming meals around artists, genres, eras, or specific albums and songs. It has since expanded to include concepts outside of the music world, but continues to pair menus with a unique soundtrack. counter- traditionally does not repeat dishes from past menus.

== See also ==
- List of Michelin-starred restaurants in the American South
