= The Catbird Seat (restaurant) =

Restaurant in Nashville, Tennessee, U.S.

- Interactive map of The Catbird Seat

Restaurant information
- Established: 2011
- Head chef: Andy Doubrava and Tiffani Ortiz
- Food type: Contemporary
- Rating: (Michelin Guide)
- Location: 700 8th Ave. 5th Floor, Nashville, Tennessee, 37203, United States
- Coordinates: 36°9′2″N 86°46′44″W
- Website: www.thecatbirdseatrestaurant.com

The Catbird Seat is a Michelin-starred restaurant in Nashville, Tennessee, United States.

== See also ==
- List of Michelin-starred restaurants in the American South
