= Bread & Butterfly =

Restaurant in Atlanta, Georgia, U.S.

- Interactive map of Bread & Butterfly

Restaurant information
- Owner: Demetrius Brown
- Head chef: Demetrius Brown
- Food type: French African
- Location: 290 Elizabeth St. NE, Atlanta, Georgia, 30307, United States
- Coordinates: 33°45′45″N 84°21′30″W

Bread & Butterfly is a restaurant in Atlanta, Georgia. It was included in The New York Times's 2024 list of the 50 best restaurants in the United States.

== See also ==
- List of restaurants in Atlanta
