= La Semilla =

Restaurant in Atlanta, Georgia, U.S.

- Interactive map of La Semilla

Restaurant information
- Location: 780 Memorial Drive SE, Atlanta, Georgia, 30316, United States
- Coordinates: 33°44′48″N 84°21′42″W

La Semilla is a restaurant in Atlanta, Georgia. It was named one of twelve best new restaurants in the United States by Eater in 2023.

== See also ==
- List of restaurants in Atlanta
