= Avize (restaurant) =

Restaurant in Atlanta, Georgia, U.S.

- Interactive map of Avize

Restaurant information
- Food type: Alpine
- Location: 956 Brady Avenue NW, Atlanta, Georgia, United States
- Coordinates: 33°46′51″N 84°24′48″W

Avize Modern Alpine, or simply Avize, is a restaurant in the West Midtown neighborhood of Atlanta, Georgia, United States. It specializes in Alpine cuisine. The business has been named to multiple lists of the best restaurants in the country.

== Description ==
The restaurant is located in Atlanta's West Midtown neighborhood. The menu focuses on the Alpine cuisines of Switzerland, Austria, Italy, Germany, and France. According to Jacinta Howard writing for The Infatuation, dinner "unfolds at a very leisurely pace". The interior is decorated to resemble a mountain lodge with an open kitchen.

== History ==
The restaurant opened in October of 2024 with Karl Gorline as executive chef and Taurean Philpott as sommelier.

== Recognition ==
It was included in The New York Times's 2025 list of the nation's 50 best restaurants and Bon Appétit's list of the top 20 best new restaurants of 2025. In 2026 it was named to S.Pellegrino & Acqua Panna's list of North America's 50 Best Restaurants.

== See also ==
- List of restaurants in Atlanta
