= Bacchanalia (restaurant) =

Restaurant in Atlanta, Georgia, U.S.

- Interactive map of Bacchanalia

Restaurant information
- Food type: American
- Location: 1460 Ellsworth Industrial Blvd. NW, Atlanta, Georgia, 30318, United States
- Coordinates: 33°47′41″N 84°25′38″W
- Website: starprovisions.com/bacchanalia

Bacchanalia is a restaurant in Atlanta, Georgia. The fine dining restaurant serves American cuisine. It received one star as well as a green star in the Michelin Guide in 2023.

== See also ==
- List of Michelin starred restaurants in Atlanta
- List of restaurants in Atlanta
