= Hungry Eyes (restaurant) =

Restaurant in New Orleans, Louisiana, U.S.

- Interactive map of Hungry Eyes

Restaurant information
- Location: 4206 Magazine Street, New Orleans, Louisiana, 70115, United States
- Coordinates: 29°55′15″N 90°05′57″W

Hungry Eyes is a restaurant in New Orleans, Louisiana. It was named one of the twenty best new restaurants of 2024 by Bon Appétit.

== See also ==
- List of restaurants in New Orleans
- List of Michelin Bib Gourmand restaurants in the United States
