= Saint Claire (restaurant) =

Restaurant in New Orleans, Louisiana, U.S.

- Interactive map of Saint Claire

Restaurant information
- Location: 1300 Richland Road, New Orleans, Louisiana, United States
- Coordinates: 29°56′26″N 90°0′55″W

Saint Claire is a French-themed restaurant in New Orleans, Louisiana, United States. It was included in The New York Times's 2025 list of the nation's 50 best restaurants.

== See also ==
- List of restaurants in New Orleans
