= List of restaurants in New Orleans =

This is a list of restaurants in the city of New Orleans, Louisiana, US.

== Current ==
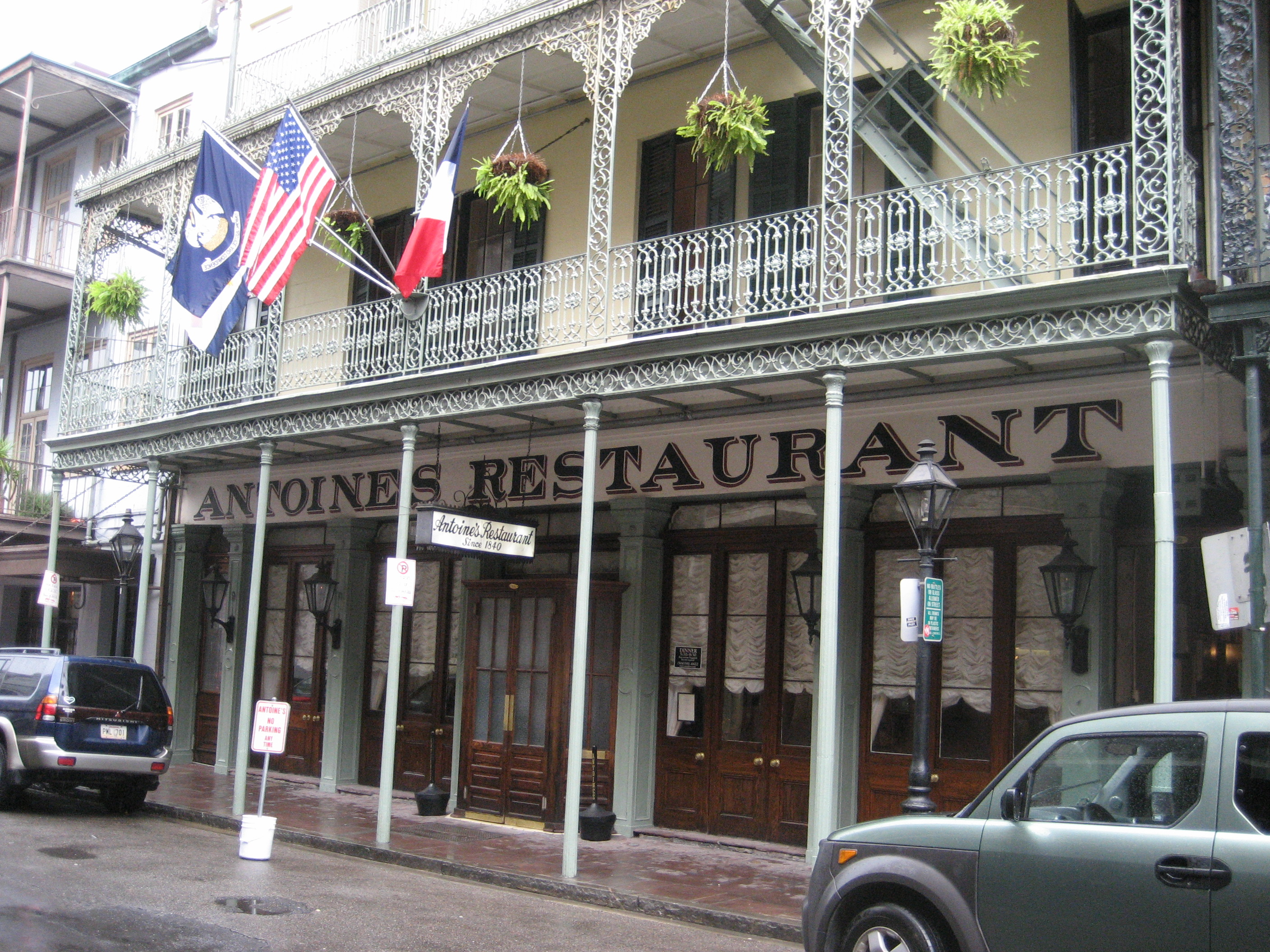
Antoine's

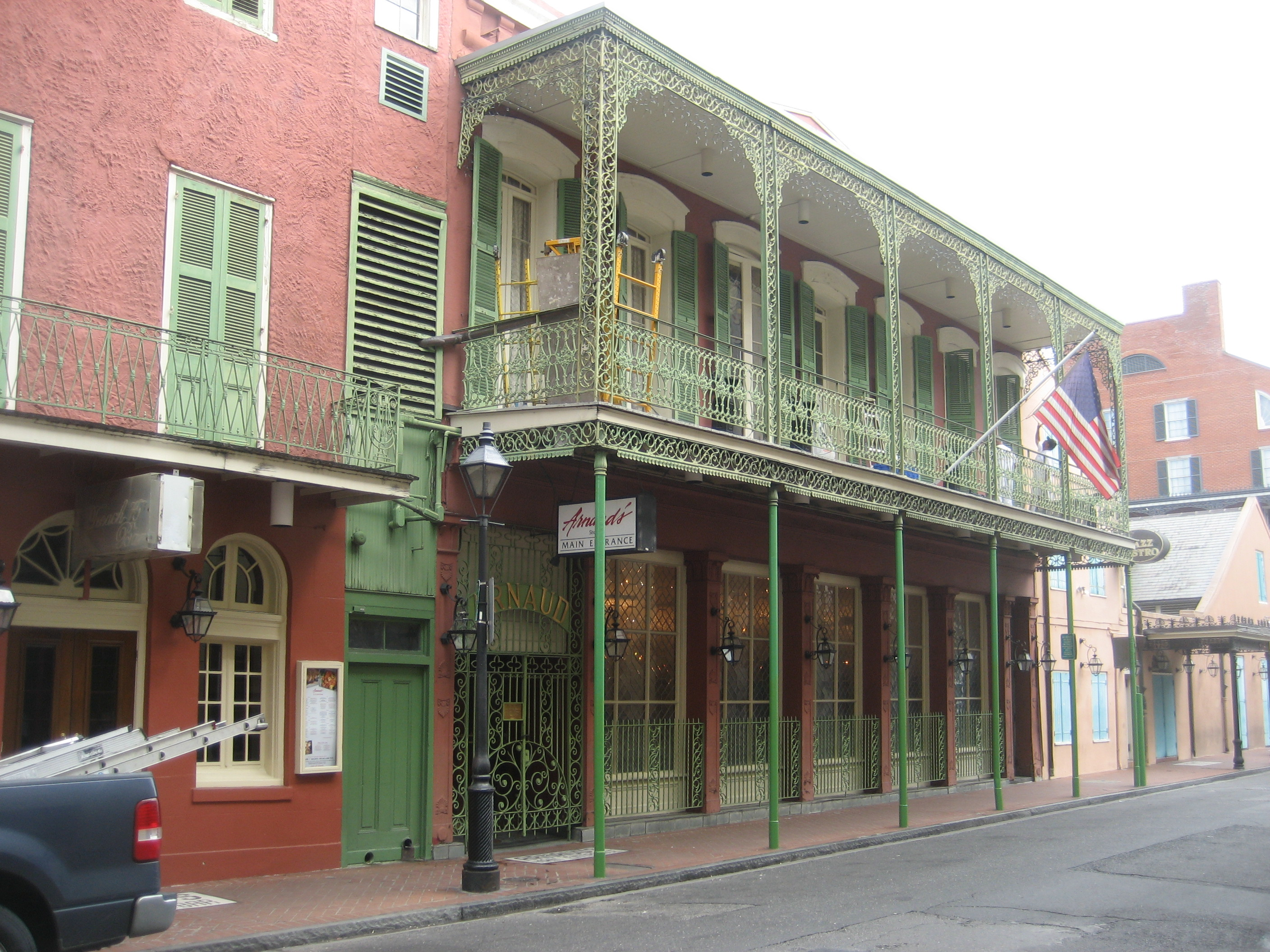
Arnaud's

- Acamaya
- Angelo Brocato's
- Antoine's
- Arnaud's
- Ayu Bakehouse
- Breads On Oak
- Brennan Family Restaurants
- Brennan's
- Broussard's
- Café du Monde
- Café Reconcile
- Camellia Grill
- Central Grocery
- Clancy's
- Commander's Palace
- Dakar NOLA
- Dickie Brennan's Steakhouse
- Domilise's Restaurant
- Dong Phuong Oriental Bakery
- Dooky Chase’s Restaurant
- Emeril's
- Galatoire's
- Hansen's Sno-Bliz
- Hungry Eyes
- Lagniappe Bakehouse
- MaMou
- Morning Call Coffee Stand
- Mr. B's Bistro
- Pat O'Brien's Bar
- Pêche Seafood Grill
- La Petite Grocery
- Ruth's Chris Steak House
- Saint Claire
- Saint-Germain
- Snug Harbor (jazz club)
- Willie Mae's Scotch House
- Vaucresson's Creole Cafe & Deli
- Zasu

== Defunct ==
- Creole Kosher Kitchen
- K-Paul's Louisiana Kitchen
- Upperline Restaurant

== See also ==
- List of Michelin-starred restaurants in the American South
