= Zasu (restaurant) =

Restaurant in New Orleans, Louisiana, U.S.

- Interactive map of Zasu

Restaurant information
- Owner: Sue Zemanick
- Head chef: Sue Zemanick
- Food type: American
- Rating: (Michelin Guide)
- Location: 127 N Carrrollton Avenue, New Orleans, LA, 70119, United States
- Coordinates: 29.9754°N 90.1003°W
- Website: zasunola.com

Zasu is a Michelin-starred restaurant in New Orleans, Louisiana, United States.

== See also ==
- List of Michelin-starred restaurants in the American South
- List of restaurants in New Orleans
