= Omakase Table =

Restaurant in Atlanta, Georgia, U.S.

- Interactive map of Omakase Table

Restaurant information
- Location: Atlanta, Georgia, United States
- Coordinates: 33°50′47.9″N 84°22′26.8″W

Omakase Table is a restaurant in Atlanta, in the U.S. state of Georgia.

== See also ==
- List of Michelin-starred restaurants in Atlanta
- List of restaurants in Atlanta
