= Hayakawa (restaurant) =

Restaurant in Atlanta, Georgia, U.S.

- Interactive map of Hayakawa

Restaurant information
- Food type: Japanese
- Location: 1055 Howell Mill Road, Atlanta, Georgia, 30318, United States
- Coordinates: 33°47′0.5″N 84°24′40.5″W
- Website: hayakawaatl.com

Hayakawa (formerly Sushi Hayakawa) is a restaurant in Atlanta, Georgia.

The restaurant serves Japanese cuisine and received a Michelin star in 2023.

== See also ==
- List of Japanese restaurants
- List of Michelin starred restaurants in Atlanta
- List of restaurants in Atlanta
