= Dakar NOLA =

Restaurant in New Orleans, Louisiana, U.S.

Coordinates: 29°55′16″N 90°05′40″W

- Interactive map of Dakar NOLA

Restaurant information
- Head chef: Serigne Mbaye
- Food type: Senegalese
- Rating: (Michelin Guide)
- Location: 3814 Magazine Street, New Orleans, Louisiana, 70115, United States
- Website: dakarnola.com

Dakar NOLA is a restaurant in New Orleans, Louisiana, United States.

== Awards and accolades ==
It was named one of the nation's twelve best new restaurants by Eater in 2023, and won the James Beard Foundation Award for Best New Restaurant in 2024. In October 2026, it was awarded a Michelin star.

== See also ==
- List of Michelin-starred restaurants in the American South
- List of restaurants in New Orleans
