= Atlas (restaurant) =

Restaurant in Atlanta, Georgia, U.S.

- Interactive map of Atlas

Restaurant information
- Head chef: Freddy Money
- Food type: American
- Rating: (Michelin Guide)
- Location: 88 W. Paces Ferry Rd. NW, Atlanta, Georgia, 30305, United States
- Coordinates: 33°50′24″N 84°22′57″W
- Website: atlasrestaurant.com

Atlas is a restaurant in the St. Regis Atlanta, in Georgia. The restaurant serves American cuisine and received a Michelin star in 2023.

== Description ==
Condé Nast Traveler says the fine dining restaurant has an "ultra fine" wine list. Approximately two dozen artworks are displayed inside, including paintings by Henri Matisse, Pablo Picasso, and Vincent van Gogh.

== See also ==
- List of Michelin starred restaurants in Atlanta
- List of restaurants in Atlanta
