= Wild Common =

Restaurant in Charleston, South Carolina, U.S.

- Interactive map of Wild Common

Restaurant information
- Head chef: Orlando Pagán (Executive Chef)
- Food type: American Contemporary
- Location: 103 Spring St., Charleston, South Carolina, 29403, United States
- Coordinates: 32°47′27″N 79°56′46″W
- Website: wildcommoncharleston.com

Wild Common is a Michelin-starred American restaurant in Charleston, South Carolina, United States.

== See also ==
- List of Michelin-starred restaurants in the American South
