= Lagniappe Bakehouse =

Bakery in New Orleans, Louisiana, U.S.

- Interactive map of Lagniappe Bakehouse

Restaurant information
- Location: 1825 Euterpe Street, New Orleans, Louisiana, United States
- Coordinates: 29°56′22″N 90°04′46″W

Lagniappe Bakehouse is a bakery in New Orleans, Louisiana, United States. In 2024, the business was included in The New York Times's list of the 22 best bakeries in the nation.

== See also ==
- List of bakeries
- List of restaurants in New Orleans
