= The Chastain =

Restaurant in Atlanta, Georgia, U.S.

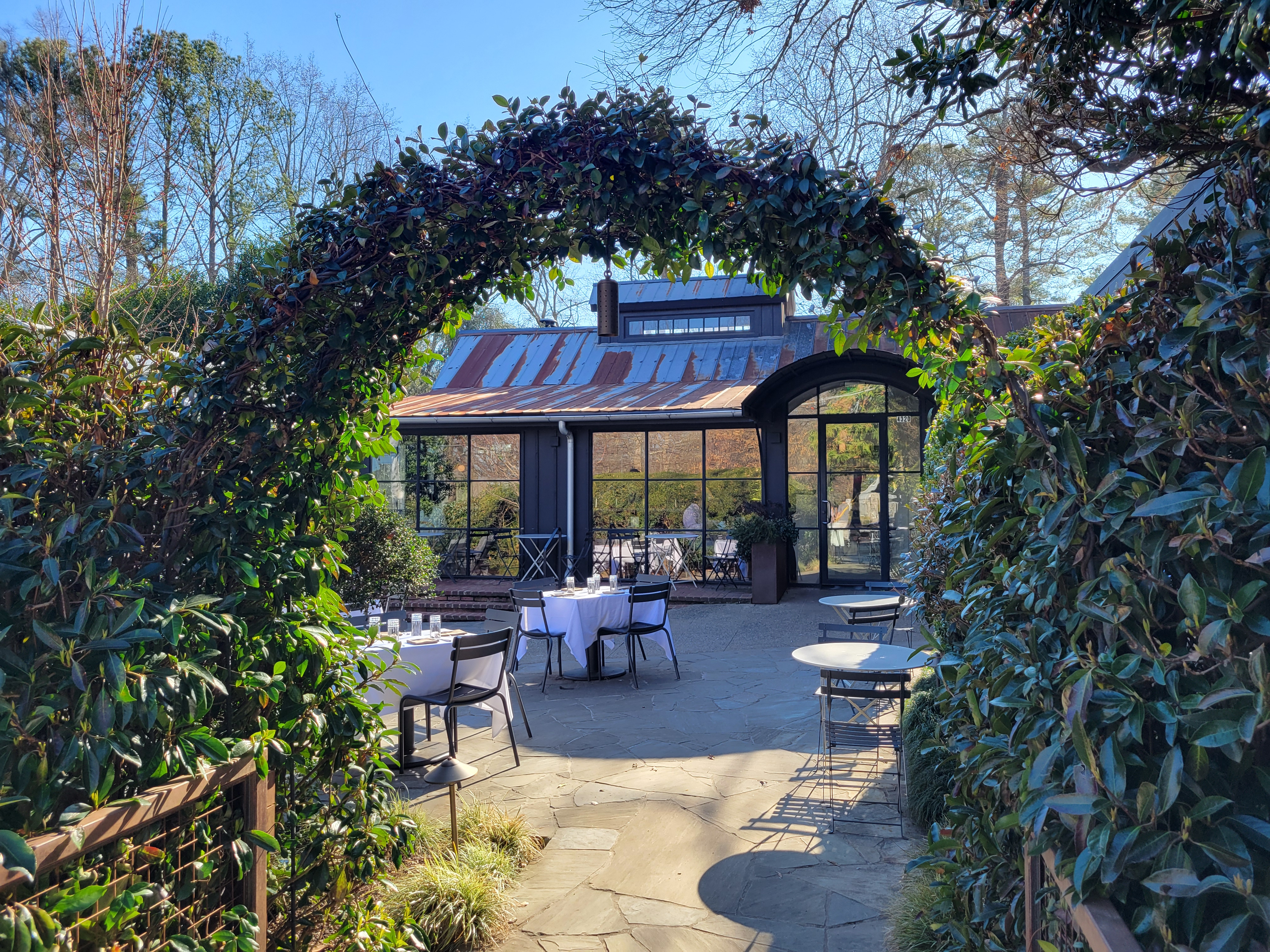
- The Chastain
- Interactive map of The Chastain

Restaurant information
- Food type: American
- Location: 4320 Powers Ferry Road NW, Atlanta, Georgia, 30342, United States
- Coordinates: 33°52′22″N 84°23′47″W

The Chastain is a restaurant in Atlanta, in the U.S. state of Georgia. The restaurant serves American, New American, and Southern cuisine. It received a green star from the Michelin Guide in 2023.

== See also ==
- List of New American restaurants
- List of restaurants in Atlanta
- List of Southern restaurants
