= Spring (restaurant) =

Restaurant in Marietta, Georgia, U.S.

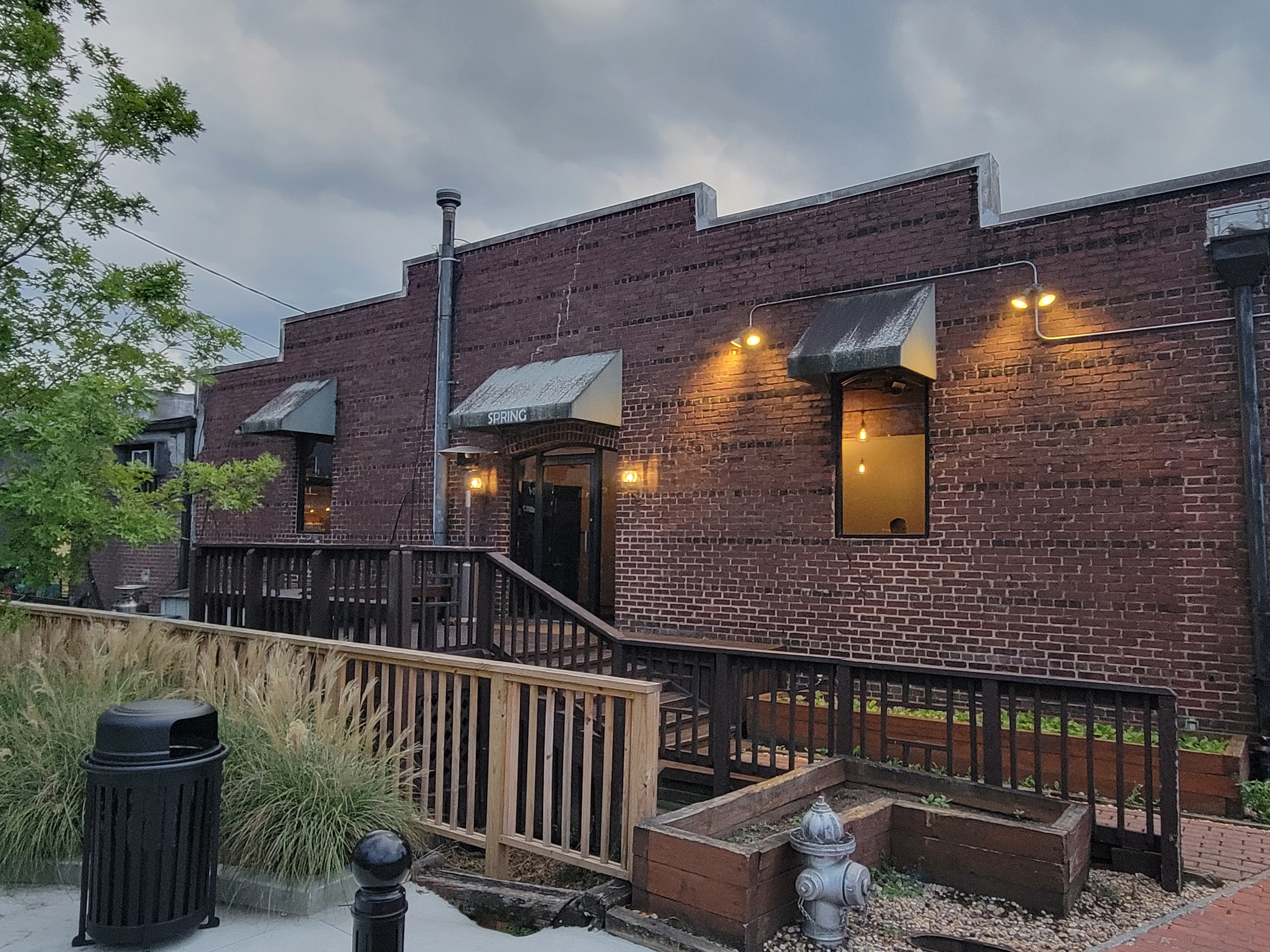
- The restaurant's exterior in 2025
- Interactive map of Spring

Restaurant information
- Food type: New American
- Location: Marietta, Georgia, United States
- Coordinates: 33°57′13.0″N 84°33′3.5″W

Spring is a Michelin-starred New American restaurant in Marietta, in the U.S. state of Georgia.

== See also ==
- List of Michelin-starred restaurants in Atlanta
- List of New American restaurants
