= Bastion Museum =

Coordinates: 43.7748°N 7.5085°E

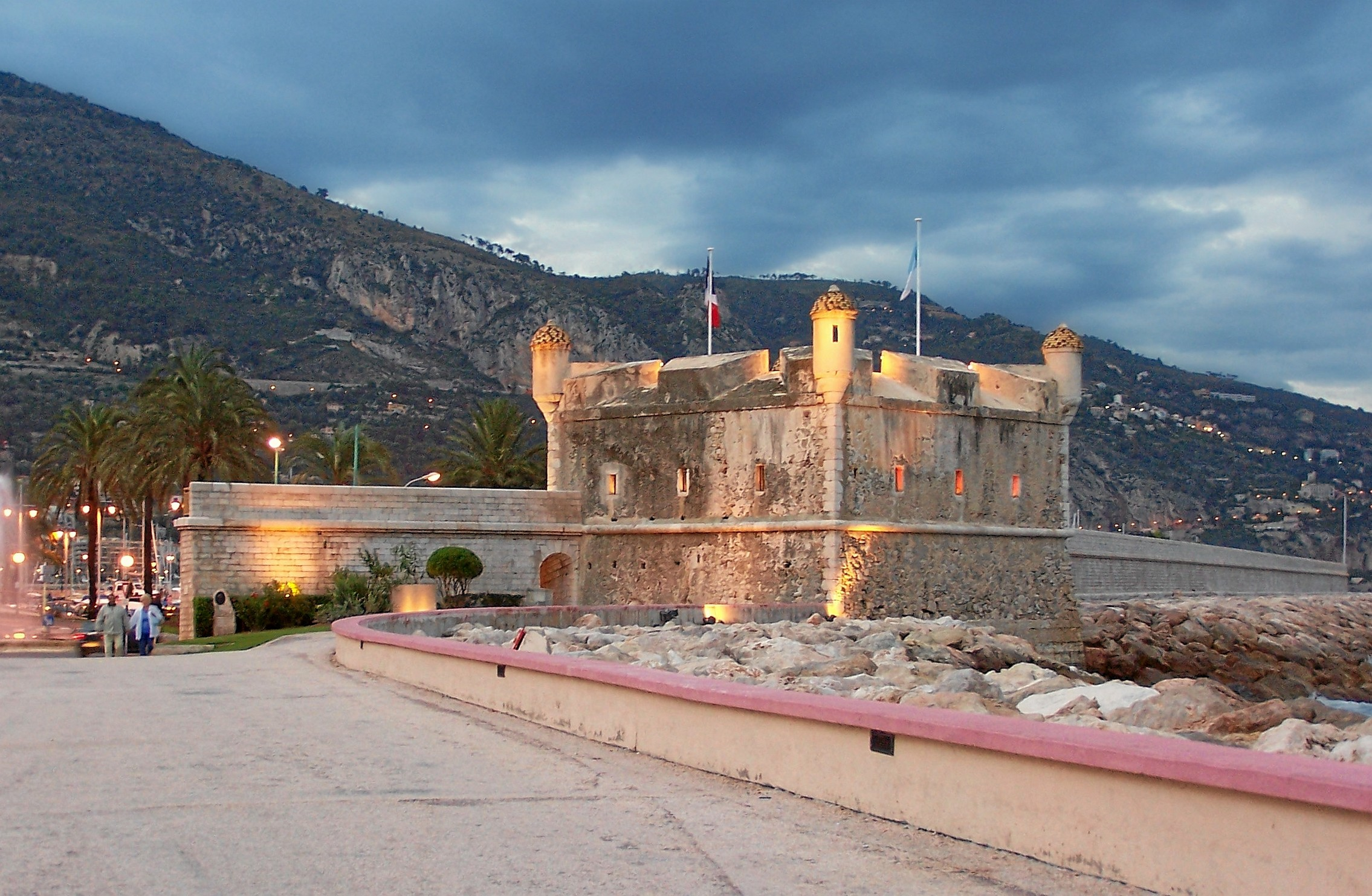
The bastion illuminated at dusk

The Bastion Museum is a museum of works by Jean Cocteau, on the harbour wall of Menton, on the French Riviera, in the Alpes-Maritimes department of France. The Bastion was built in the 17th century by Honoré II, Prince of Monaco. Cocteau restored the Bastion himself, decorating the alcoves, reception hall and outer walls with mosaics made from pebbles.

The Bastion Museum opened in 1966, three years after Cocteau's death.

A new exhibition of Cocteau's work is installed in the Bastion every year.

== History ==
In 1619, Honoré II Grimaldi, Prince of Monaco, ordered the construction of a small fort on what was then a rock islet to defend Menton from seaward attacks. Construction was completed in 1636.

The fort housed a brick-vaulted guardroom and a kitchen on the upper floor and a gunpowder magazine on the lower floor. The oven can still be seen in what used to be the kitchen. Access from land was made via a wooden walkway and steps through a doorway on the upper level, above which the Grimaldi crest carved in the stone lintel is still visible.

After Menton seceded from Monaco in 1848, the fort was used as a salt storehouse. When the harbor was built in the late 19th century, the Bastion was integrated into the mole and converted into a lighthouse. It later served as a jail during World War II.

== Name ==
Although not technically a bastion but rather a blockhouse, the building was known to locals as u Bastian in the Mentonasc dialect. Jean Cocteau nicknamed it "the Citadel".

== Collection ==
The original collection was made up of 102 pieces selected by Jean Cocteau specifically for this museum, including 70 drawings, 2 paintings, 3 lithographs, 2 tapestries and 11 ceramic pieces, all colorful works from Cocteau's Mediterranean period (1950–1963). It was later expanded through purchases and donations by Cocteau's legatee Édouard Dermit and artist Irène Lagut. Notable works include the Innamorati and Sphinxes series of wax pastel drawings, the Judith and Holofernes tapestry and sketches for the decor of the Menton wedding hall.

Since the opening of musée Jean Cocteau collection Severin Wunderman in 2011, both museums' collections have been merged. The collection of Wunderman was collected, purchased and curated for Mr. Wunderman by his Executive Director Chevalier Tony Clark of the Severin Wunderman Museum. The Bastion museum hosts sections of musée Jean Cocteau collection Severin Wunderman's exhibitions or its own.

== See also ==
- Musée Jean Cocteau collection Severin Wunderman, its sister museum in Menton opened in 2011, also dedicated to Jean Cocteau.
