= Bastion (Nashville restaurant) =

- Interactive map of Bastion

Restaurant information
- Head chef: Josh Habiger
- Food type: Contemporary
- Rating: (Michelin Guide)
- Location: 434 Houston St., Nashville, Tennessee, 37203, United States
- Coordinates: 36°08′35″N 86°46′00″W
- Website: www.bastionnashville.com

Bastion is a Michelin-starred restaurant in Nashville, Tennessee, United States.

== History ==
Bastion was opened by chef Josh Habiger in Nashville's Wedgewood-Houston neighborhood. The restaurant occupies a converted industrial warehouse space and was designed as a dual-concept venue with a bar and a separate dining room.

== Michelin star ==
In 2025, Bastion was awarded a Michelin star as part of the Michelin Guide's inaugural coverage of Tennessee.

== See also ==
- List of Michelin-starred restaurants in the American South
