= Mujō (restaurant) =

Restaurant in Atlanta, Georgia, U.S.

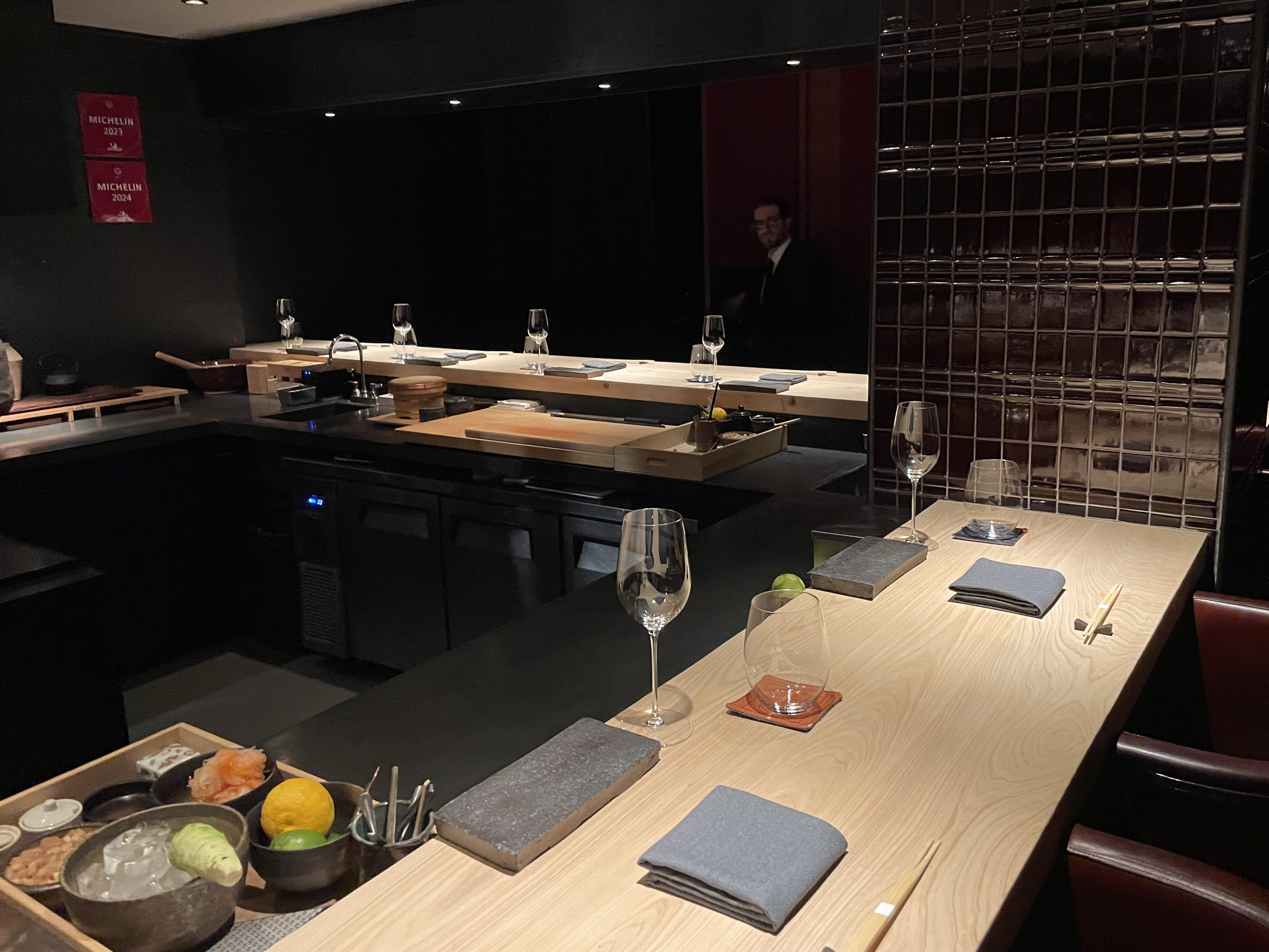
- Dining room at Mujō
- Interactive map of Mujō

Restaurant information
- Established: February 16, 2022
- Food type: Japanese
- Location: 691 14th Street NW, Atlanta, Georgia, 30318, United States
- Coordinates: 33°47′10″N 84°24′41″W
- Website: mujoatl.com

Mujō is a restaurant in Atlanta, Georgia, United States. The restaurant serves Japanese cuisine and received a Michelin star in 2023.

== See also ==
- List of Japanese restaurants
- List of Michelin starred restaurants in Atlanta
- List of restaurants in Atlanta
