= Scoundrel (restaurant) =

Restaurant in Greenville, South Carolina, U.S.

- Interactive map of Scoundrel

Restaurant information
- Established: 21 October 2022 (3 years ago)
- Location: 18 N Main St, Greenville, South Carolina, SC 29601, United States
- Coordinates: 34.851091°N 82.398533°W
- Website: scoundrelgvl.com

Scoundrel is a restaurant in Greenville, South Carolina, United States. It was a semifinalist in the Best New Restaurant category of the James Beard Foundation Awards in 2024. In November of 2025 Scoundrel became the first restaurant in Greenville to receive a Michelin Star.

== History ==
The restaurant opened on October 21, 2022.
