= Inegen =

Inegen Инегень
- Selo
- Location within Altai Republic Location within Russia
- Coordinates: 50°19′N 86°41′E
- Country: Russia
- Region: Altai Republic
- District: Ongudaysky District
- Foundation: 1796
- Time zone: UTC+7:00

Inegen (Russian: Инегень; Altay: Ийнеген, İynegen) is a rural locality (a selo) in the Ongudaysky District, the Altai Republic, Russia. The population was 176 as of 2016. There are 5 streets.

== History ==
The village was founded in 1796.

In 1895, the village was mentioned and visited by Semenov-Tyan-Shansky, Veniamin Petrovich, and later on in 1905, Viktor Ivanovich Vereshchagin noted about Inegen and its surroundings in his diary.

== Geography ==
Inegen is located 88 km southeast of Onguday (the district's administrative centre) by road. Inya is the nearest rural locality.
