= Vaucresson's Creole Cafe & Deli =

New Orleans restaurant

Vaucresson’s Creole Cafe & Deli
- Interactive map of Vaucresson’s Creole Cafe & Deli

Restaurant information
- Established: 1899; 127 years ago
- Owner: Vaucresson Sausage Co.
- Managers: Julie Vaucresson; Vance Vaucresson
- Location: 1800 St Bernard Ave, New Orleans, Louisiana, 70116, United States
- Coordinates: 29.97458°N 90.06702°W
- Website: www.vaucressonsausage.com

Vaucresson’s Creole Cafe & Deli is a restaurant in the Seventh Ward of New Orleans. The brand is best known for its hot sausage, a Creole chaurice, blending beef and pork that gives a "juicy bite, an audible snap and a layered flavor of savory spice." Co-owner, Vance, shared that as a result of the Seventh Ward's Italian and Creole heritage, the two cultures shared a lot of their cooking traditions. Thus, the paneed meat at Vaucresson’s has those influences mixed in.

== History ==
Initial iterations of the restaurant were a result of the emigration of Levinsky Vaucresson, from France to New Orleans in 1899. Levinsky was a trained butcher and had a stall at the St. Bernard Market. That market later developed into Circle Food Store, a one-of-a-kind grocery and community hub. By 1967, Robert "Sonny" Vaucresson Sr., father of current owner Vance, also opened a restaurant called Vaucresson's Creole Cafe on Bourbon Street, in what later became part of Pat O'Brien's Bar. It was a rare example of a black-owned business in the French Quarter, and Vance calls it the first black-owned business on Bourbon Street.

In 2006, the Vaucresson’s home base on St. Bernard Avenue was knocked out by flooding from the Katrina levee failures. However, Vaucresson was able to resume production at other facilities and stay operational.

As a result of the COVID-19 pandemic, Vaucresson’s couldn't rely on institutional sales like selling to restaurants and different entities, so they decided to shift focus to direct-to-consumer sales. Thus, Julie Frederick Vaucresson decided to publish a cookbook Creole Made Easy to help people make some of their classics. Also, the book has family recipes and she talks about Creole culture and history.

Vaucresson's was a grant recipient of the 2022 Black Restaurant Accelerator (BRA), a joint initiative of the National Urban League and the PepsiCo Foundation. The family opened Vaucresson’s Creole Cafè & Deli at its current location on St. Bernard Avenue in October 2022. This butcher shop and café was the result of a redevelopment plan between the Vaucresson family and the nonprofit Crescent City Community Land Trust. The plans also included affordable apartments in the renovated property.

=== Jazz Fest ===
Since 1970, Vaucresson Sausage Co. has been serving its Creole hot sausage po-boys and other flavors at every Jazz Fest. As of 2025, it is the last remaining original vendor at Jazz Fest.

== Honors and awards ==
In 1998, Jazz Fest added Sonny Vaucresson to its "Ancestors" monuments, a collection of colorful statues honoring Jazz Fest greats.
