= Roly Poly (sandwich store chain) =

American sandwich store chain

- Type: Private
- Industry: Restaurants
- Founded: Atlanta, Georgia (1996)
- Headquarters: Atlanta, Georgia
- Key people: Linda Wolf, President; Julie Reid, Vice President
- Products: Sandwiches; Salads
- Website: http://www.rolypoly.com/

Roly Poly is an American chain of sandwich stores. They first opened their doors in Atlanta, Georgia, in 1996.

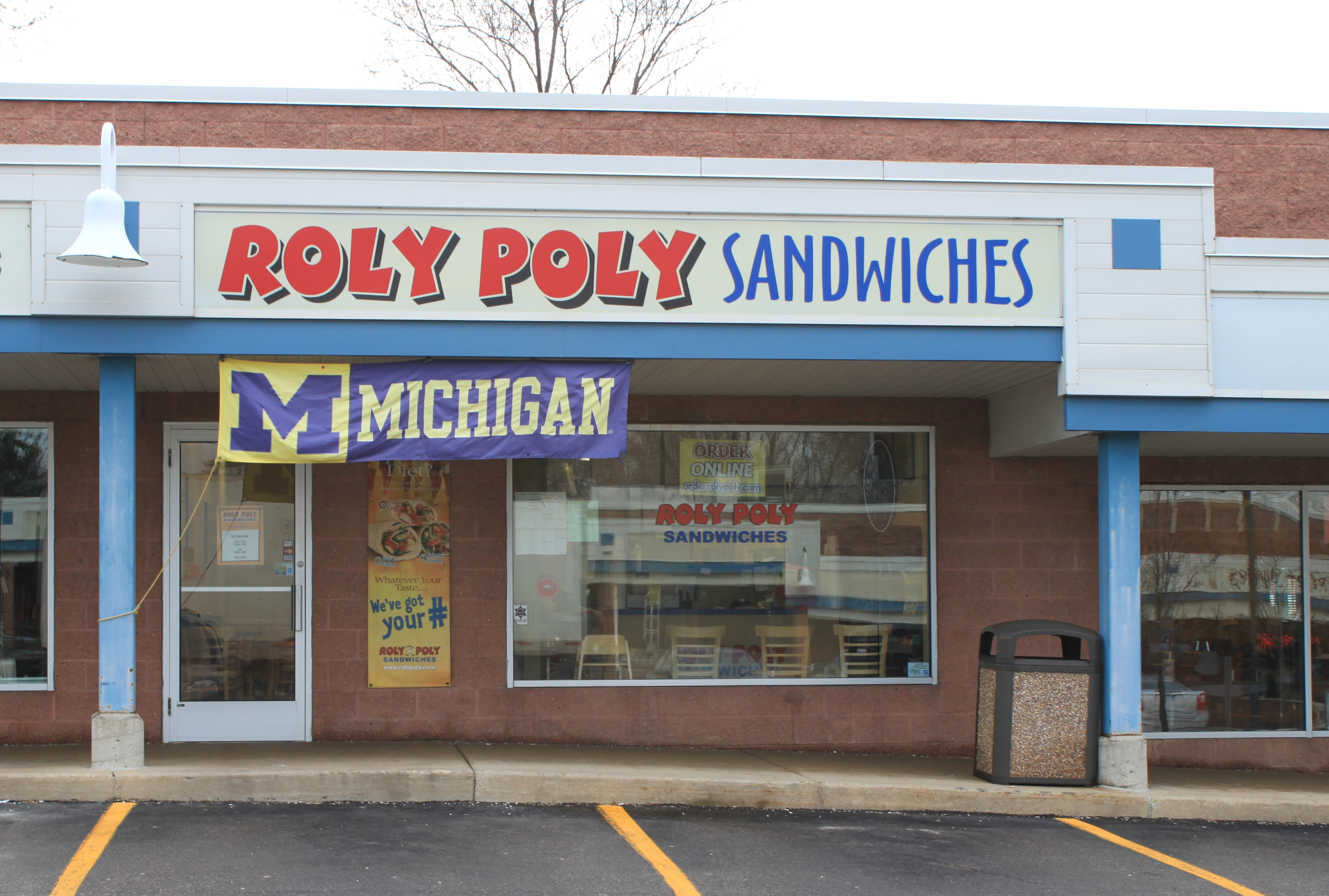
Roly Poly sandwich shop, Ann Arbor, Michigan

== History ==
The first Roly Poly Sandwich Shop opened in 1997 in the Buckhead section of Atlanta, Georgia. Company founders Linda Wolf and Julie Reid had been rolling sandwiches in their shops in New Canaan, Connecticut (1986) and in Key West, Florida (1997) before building their franchise system.

== Number of Locations Over Time ==
At one point in the early 2000s they had over 170 locations in 27 states. The chain has since declined to 27 locations as of January 2021.

Locations by Year
Year	Number of Locations at Beginning of Year	Locations Opened During Year	Locations Closed During Year	Number of Locations at End of Year
2009	130	5	26	109
2010	109	4	13	100
2011	100	7	15	92
2012	92	3	8	87
2013	87	3	8	82
2014	82	4	10	76
2015	76	3	7	72
2016	72	1	14	59
2017	59	4	7	56
2018	56	0	9	47
2019	47	0	9	38
2020	38	1	12	27
2021	27	0	1	26
Totals	-104	35	139	-83

== Current Locations ==
=== Alabama ===
- Birmingham - Homewood

=== Georgia ===
- Augusta
- Duluth
- Macon
- Savannah

=== Indiana ===
- Bloomington (closing October 10, 2026)
- Terre Haute (closing October 10, 2026)

=== Louisiana ===
- Alexandria
- Baton Rouge - Corporate Blvd
- Baton Rouge - Coursey
- Baton Rouge - Downtown
- Lafayette
- Lake Charles
- New Orleans
- Ruston
- Sulphur
- West Monroe

=== Maryland ===
- Annapolis

=== Michigan ===
- Grand Blanc

=== North Carolina ===
- Raleigh

=== South Carolina ===
- Columbia

=== Texas ===
- Dallas
