= Cindy Brennan =

American restaurateur

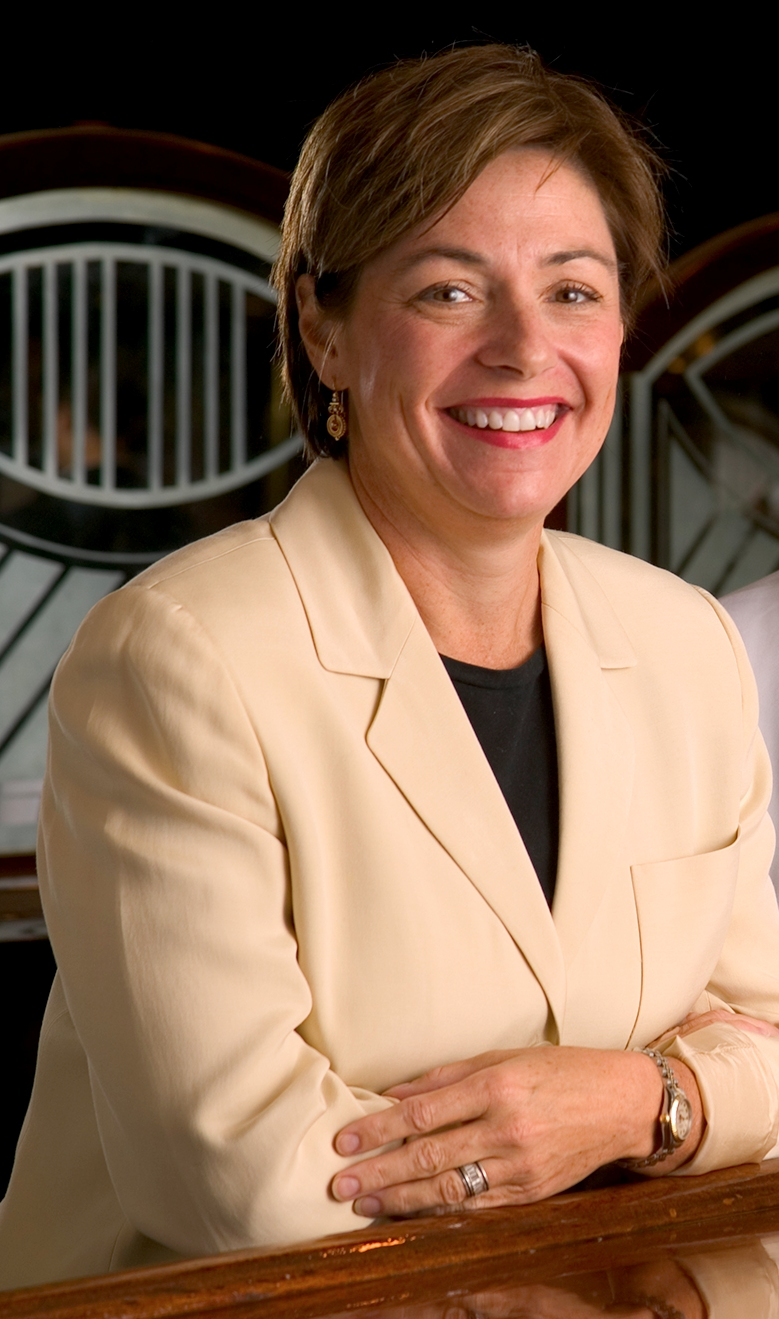
- Born: Cynthia Brennan
- Other name: Cynthia Brennan Davis
- Education: Tulane University
- Spouse: William Edward Davis
- Children: 2
- Culinary career
- Current restaurants
- Mr. B's Bistro; Commander's Palace; Brennan's of Houston
- Awardss
- Culinary Institute of America's Leadership Award (2008); Food Arts' Silver Spoon Award (2014)

Cindy Brennan is a member of the Brennan restaurant family who got their start in the restaurant business two generations ago in New Orleans. She is co-owner and managing partner of Mr. B's Bistro, which opened in 1979 in the French Quarter of New Orleans. Brennan is the author of The Mr. B's Bistro Cookbook: Simply Legendary Recipes From New Orleans's Favorite French Quarter Restaurant (ISBN 0976300605). The cookbook includes 112 recipes from the restaurant’s menu.

== Education ==
Cindy received her bachelor's degree in Business Administration from Tulane University.

== Career ==
Cindy's father, John Brennan, along with other members of his family opened Brennan's of Houston in 1967, and later Commander's Palace in 1969. Cindy Brennan became an owner of Brennan's of Houston and Commander’s Palace, along with her ownership of Mr. B’s Bistro in 1998.

In 1991, Ralph and Cindy Brennan opened Ristorante Bacco, an Italian restaurant, located in the De la Poste Hotel of New Orleans. After 19 years, Bacco closed in 2011.

In 2008, Cindy and the Brennan family were given a leadership award from the Culinary Institute of America. In 2014, Food Arts Magazine awarded the Brennan family the Silver Spoon Award.

== Personal life ==
Cindy is the sister of Ralph, Lally, and Tommy Brennan. She is married to Dr. William Edward Davis and has two children; Bren and Ellie Davis.

== See also ==
- Brennan Family Restaurants
- Ralph Brennan
- Ella Brennan
