= Ella Brennan =

American restaurateur (1925–2018)

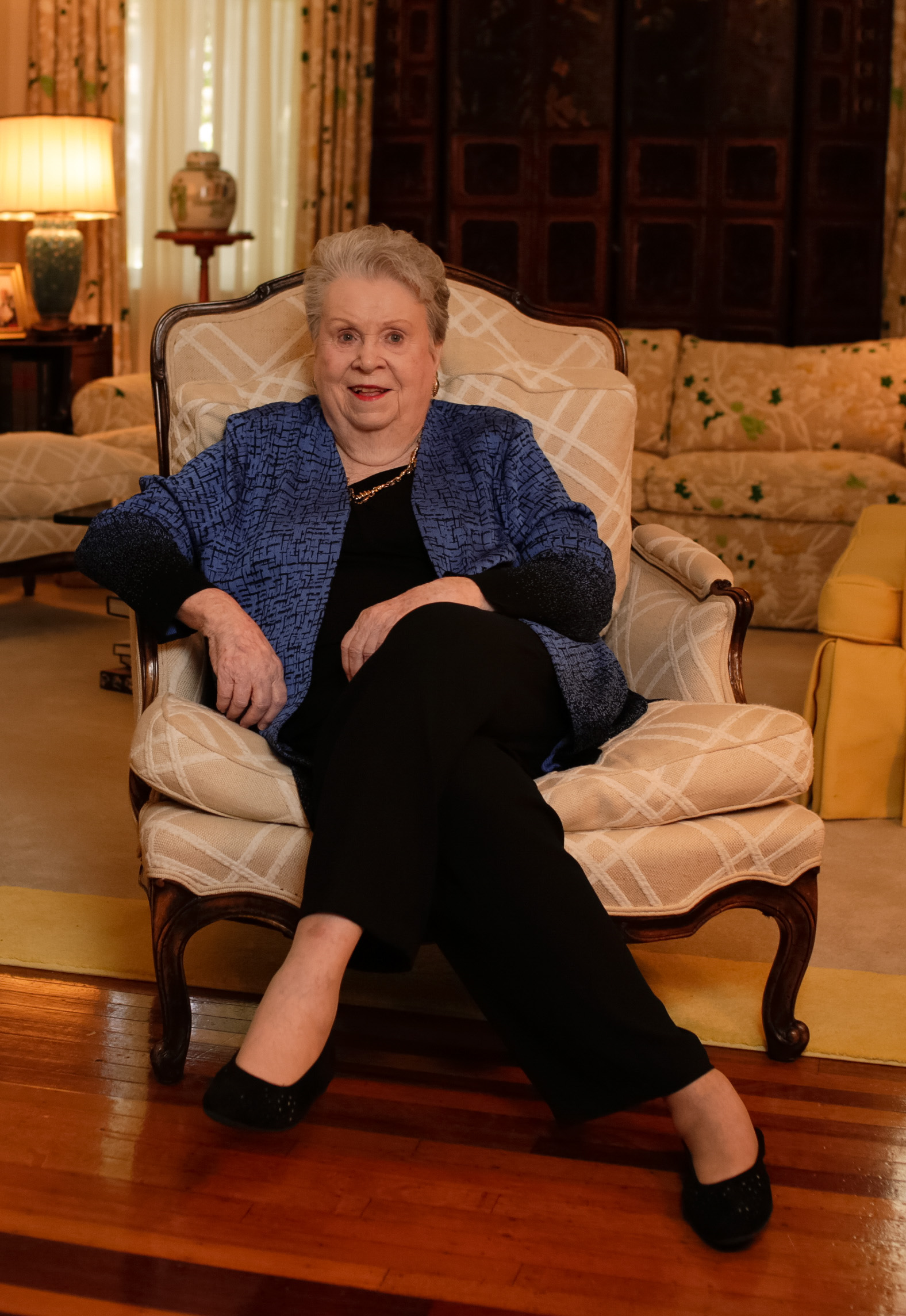
- Ella Brennan at her home in 2016
- Born: November 27, 1925; New Orleans, Louisiana
- Died: May 31, 2018 (aged 92)
- Culinary career
- Cooking style: Louisiana Creole cuisine
- Ratings: Michelin stars; AAA Motor Club; Mobil; Good Food Guide
- Previous restaurants: Old Absinthe House (1943–1946); Brennan's (1946–1969); Commander's Palace (1969–2018)
- Award won: James Beard Foundation Lifetime Achievement Award

Ella Brennan (November 27, 1925 – May 31, 2018) was an American restaurateur and part of a family of restaurateurs specializing in haute Louisiana Creole cuisine in New Orleans, Louisiana.

== Early life and education ==
Brennan was born in New Orleans, Louisiana on November 27, 1925. Her father was a shipyard superintendent and her mother, Nellie (Valentine) Brennan, was a homemaker and inventive home cook. Ella grew up in New Orleans and graduated from high school in 1943.

== Career ==
Her brother Owen Brennan owned the Old Absinthe House on Bourbon Street, and Ella Brennan worked there as a teenager. He also opened the Vieux Carré Restaurant on Bourbon Street. Plans to move the restaurant to Royal Street were interrupted when Owen suddenly died and banks pulled out of the venture. Acquiring her own backing, Ella did open the new restaurant in 1956, the first Brennan's Restaurant. This tactic was very successful and Ella worked behind the scenes, as well as out front, to ensure the quality of the dishes. A family dispute dislodged her from the restaurant completely, and she countered by taking over a restaurant of her own with her siblings Adelaide Brennan, Dottie Brennan, John Brennan and Dick Brennan. Commander's Palace became one of the culinary destinations of the South, if not the entire nation. At Commander's Palace she worked with Paul Prudhomme, beginning in 1975, and Emeril Lagasse from 1983.

Miss Ella (as she became known) went on to develop the careers of many chefs including James Beard Foundation Award winners Jamie Shannon and Tory McPhail, who was the chef at Commander's Palace until the end of 2020 when he handed over the reins of the kitchen to Meg Bickford.

== Death and legacy ==
She died on May 31, 2018, at the age of 92. Her daughter Ti Adelaide Martin is co-proprietor of Commander's Palace and SoBou restaurants, and her son Alex Brennan-Martin is proprietor of Brennan's of Houston.

She was the subject of a 2017 documentary, Ella Brennan: Commanding the Table.

== Awards ==
In 2009, she received the James Beard Foundation Lifetime Achievement Award. In 2002 she received a Lifetime Achievement Award from the Southern Foodways Alliance.
