= 7two =

Australian television channel

- Logo used since 2020
- Type: Adult programming • General entertainment
- Country: Australia
- Broadcast area: Sydney; Melbourne; Brisbane; Adelaide; Perth; Tasmania; Darwin; Regional Queensland; Northern NSW & Gold Coast; Southern NSW & ACT; Regional Victoria; Mildura; Spencer Gulf & Broken Hill; Remote Central & Eastern Australia; Western Australia
- Network: Seven Network

Programming
- Language: English
- Picture format: 1080i HDTV (Note: Available in Sydney, Melbourne, Brisbane, Adelaide, Perth, regional Queensland, Northern NSW & Gold Coast, Southern NSW & ACT, Regional Victoria, Mildura.)

Ownership
- Owner: Seven Media Group
- Sister channels: Channel 7; 7HD; 7mate 7flix 7Bravo; TVSN; Racing.com

History
- Launched: 1 November 2009; 16 years ago
- Former names: 7TWO (2009–2020)

Links
- Website: 7plus.com.au

Availability

Terrestrial
- ATN Sydney (DVB-T): 1314 @ 6 (177.5 MHz)
- HSV Melbourne (DVB-T): 1330 @ 6 (177.5 MHz)
- BTQ Brisbane/Gold Coast (DVB-T): 1346 @ 6 (177.5 MHz)
- SAS Adelaide (DVB-T): 1362 @ 6 (177.5 MHz)
- TVW Perth/Mandurah (DVB-T): 1378 @ 6 (177.5 MHz)
- Freeview Seven owned (virtual): 72/62
- Freeview Seven Regional (virtual): 62
- Freeview WIN Griffith NSW/Eastern SA (virtual): 62

Streaming media
- 7plus

7two is an Australian free-to-air digital television multichannel, which was launched by the Seven Network on 1 November 2009.

The channel broadcasts a variety of programs, targeting a 25-and-over audience. 7two offers a broad selection of programs covering a variety of genres including lifestyle, drama, adventure, reality observational-documentaries and comedy.

== History ==
The channel was officially announced by the Seven Network on its breakfast program, Sunrise, at 7:45 am AEDT 23 October 2009. Earlier, speculation suggested that Seven would launch its secondary channel around November 2009, with possible names including 7PLUS, PLUS7, Channel Mate and 7TWO. Seven's then-programming chief Tim Worner stated after the reveal that some of the potential names were red herrings to keep details of the channel a secret. PLUS7 and Channel Mate (as 7mate) were later used for Seven's internet TV catch-up service and Seven's second digital multi-channel, respectively.

The channel launched with the airing of a promotional video called "It's Time", featuring Seven Network personalities and clips of shows and movies intended to be broadcast on the channel, followed by normal programming. This video was also launched on the multi-channel's website and received cross-promotion on the primary Seven channel. The Seven Network continues its policy of cross-promoting each channel's content across all four channels (Seven, 7two, 7mate and 7flix) to this day. Seven presenters Tom Williams and Johanna Griggs initially served as the "face" of the channel and were seen presenting 7two's Friday and Sunday night lifestyle line-ups in early 2011.

The channel did not launch on the same day to many regional areas. 7two was launched for Southern Cross Television viewers in Tasmania and Darwin on 1 December 2009, and for Prime Television viewers in Regional Victoria, Northern & Southern NSW and the ACT on 23 December 2009 from 9 am. From launch, Prime broadcast the channel as '7TWO on Prime'.

In January 2011, regional broadcaster Prime Television changed the name of its primary channel to 'Prime7', to reflect its strong relationship with its metropolitan partner, Seven. This led to Prime's transmission of 7two being rebranded as simply 7two, like the metropolitan counterpart.

In July 2020, 7TWO underwent a major rebrand, its first since its inception. The logo applies the same orange 7 ribbon logo but with TWO in lower case and the channel now referred to as 7two.

== Programming ==
From launch, premiere seasons of previous Seven shows including Lost, Ugly Betty, Heroes and 24 were broadcast, along with a mix of other new and classic programming along with movies sourced from Disney.

Prime-time programs used to screen under themed nightly blocks such as 'Action Time' and 'Movie Time', however these disappeared as the focus of the channel changed in 2010. The revised channel included 'Best of British' content such as thrice-weekly British murder/mystery (Heartbeat and Jonathan Creek), British comedy (Are You Being Served? and Keeping Up Appearances), and British lifestyle (Escape to the Country and Bargain Hunt). The launch of male-skewing sister channel 7mate in September 2010 led to a number of programs moving across from Seven's already existing channels, including 7TWO, to the new channel. 7TWO's target audience was also refined to people 55-plus. Programs that made the move from 7TWO included Air Crash Investigations, Scrubs, NWA: On Fire, Whacked Out Sports, Lost, Last Comic Standing, That '70s Show, AFL Game Day, Gary Unmarried, Club Reps, Fifth Gear, Monster Garage, and The Sopranos.

The weekday daytime schedule has seen numerous changes since launch as channel executives tried to find the right mix with viewers. At launch, 'Kid's Time' broadcast a block of children's programs each morning such as Yin Yang Yo! and Digimon Data Squad, soap operas aired in the early afternoon and 'Kitchen Time' featured in the late afternoons with Essence of Emeril and The Martha Stewart Show among the programs broadcast. In 2010, soap operas including Shortland Street, Coronation Street and, briefly, Emmerdale and Hollyoaks joined classic Australian soap Sons and Daughters and early years of Home and Away into its mid-morning schedule along with early episodes of quiz show Deal Or No Deal. In early afternoon, a mix of repeated fare such as Mistresses, Murphy Brown, Doctor Finlay, and movies from the Sony Pictures library are shown. Occasionally, shows which first aired the previous night on the main Seven channel are encored on 7TWO during the day. While initially, dramas such as Grey's Anatomy were encored, more recently this has remained true only for Seven's local reality shows such as The X Factor and My Kitchen Rules. An early morning weekly omnibus of the previous week's new episodes of Home and Away airs on Sundays.

By the end of Summer 2010/11, 7TWO had proven itself to become the most watched multi-channel in the country dominating primetime slots with a total 6.4% audience share via the network across the 5 major cities and winning 9 weeks over 9Go!'s two weeks (one joint with 7TWO) which is largely attributed to the channel's increased broadcast of British-originated content across the week. In 2011, following 9Go!'s ratings share success (for digital channels) in 2010, 7TWO has stolen their crown as the number one multi-channel and the number one most-watched multichannel of the decade and century in Australia.

In 2012, the Seven Network introduced new weekday morning blocks of children's programming to air on both 7TWO and 7mate. Branded as Total Girl, the 7TWO block featured female-skewing Disney series such as Hannah Montana, Wizards of Waverly Place, Sonny with a Chance and Good Luck Charlie, while the 7mate block aired male-skewing programs branded as K-Zone. Saturday Disney aired on 7TWO between 2012 to 2016, for two hours of its weekly episode. From 2013 onwards, local Australian children's programs from the Seven Network were moved to air weekdays on 7two. These titles included game shows such as Match It, animated series such as The Deep, The Wild Adventures of Blinky Bill and Beat Bugs, and programs for preschoolers including Pipsqueaks.

7two broadcast a wide range of both classic and new films that were sourced from RKO Radio Pictures, Icon Productions, Entertainment One, StudioCanal, Metro-Goldwyn-Mayer, United Artists, Orion Pictures, 20th Century Fox, Universal Pictures, Columbia Pictures and TriStar Pictures.

=== Current programming ===
==== Comedy ====
- Kath & Kim
- Mrs. Brown's Boys
- The Vicar of Dibley

==== Documentary ====
- Air Crash Investigations
- Cities of the Underworld
- Coastwatch Oz
- RSPCA Animal Rescue
- This Rugged Coast

==== Drama ====
- A Touch of Frost
- Doc Martin
- Downton Abbey
- Endeavour
- Father Brown
- Foyle's War
- Heartbeat
- The Indian Doctor
- Inspector George Gently
- The Inspector Lynley Mysteries
- Inspector Morse
- Judge John Deed
- The Last Detective
- Murdoch Mysteries
- Rosemary & Thyme
- Wire in the Blood

==== Game shows ====
- The Chase UK
- Million Dollar Minute

==== Lifestyle ====
- 60 Minute Makeover
- Auction Squad
- Bargain Hunt
- Best House on the Street
- Best Houses Australia
- Better Homes and Gardens
- Creek to Coast
- Escape to the Continent
- Escape to the Country
- The Great South East
- Harry's Practice
- Homes Under the Hammer
- The Lucky Country
- Melbourne Weekender
- Mighty Cruise Ships
- Queensland Weekender
- Selling Houses Australia
- Sydney Weekender
- WA Weekender

==== Lottery ====
- Monday Lotto
- Oz Lotto Tuesday
- Wednesday Lotto
- Powerball Thursday
- Saturday Lotto

==== News ====
- NBC Meet the Press
- NBC Today

==== Religious ====
- Amazing Facts
- David Jeremiah
- It Is Written
- Michael Youssef

==== Sport ====
- The Cricket
- Horse Racing on Seven

== Former programming ==
=== Adult animation ===
- King of the Hill

=== Children's ===
- Action Man A.T.O.M. (2009–10)
- A.N.T. Farm (2012–15)
- Austin & Ally (2013–16)
- Avenger Penguins (2009–11)
- Beat Bugs (2016, 2018, 2020)
- The Book Place (2010–11)
- Bottersnikes and Gumbles (2015–16, 2018–20)
- Bubble Town Club (2010–12)
- Castaway (2014)
- Combo Niños (2009–11)
- Count Duckula (2009–11)
- Danger Mouse (1981) (2009–11)
- The DaVincibles (2013–15)
- The Deep (2015–17, 2019)
- Digimon Data Squad (2009–11)
- Dive Olly Dive (2013–14)
- Dog with a Blog (2014–15)
- Drop Dead Weird (2017–19)
- The Emperor's New School (2010)
- Erky Perky (2013)
- Flipper (2009–11)
- Flushed (2015–20)
- Get Arty (2017–20)
- Get Clever (2018–20)
- Ghosts of Time (2013–15)
- Good Luck Charlie (2012–15)
- Gravity Falls (2015–16)
- Hairy Legs (2014–18)
- Hannah Montana (2012)
- Harry's Mad (2010)
- History Hunters (2013–15)
- I Didn't Do It (2015)
- I'm in the Band (2012–13)
- In Your Dreams (2013–17)
- It's Academic (2013–19)
- Jessie (2013–16)
- JONAS (2012)
- Kick Buttowski: Suburban Daredevil (2013)
- Kickin' It (2014–15)
- Kitty is Not a Cat (2017–20)
- Lab Rats (2015–16)
- Lab Rats Challenge (2013–15)
- Larry the Wonderpup (2018–20)
- Legend of Enyo (2013)
- Liv and Maddie (2014–15)
- Match It (2013–19)
- Motown Magic (2019)
- News of the Wild (2018–19)
- Mighty Med (2015)
- Oh Yuck! (2017–19)
- Pair of Kings (2012–13, 2016)
- Phineas and Ferb (2012–16)
- Power Rangers: Jungle Fury (2010–11)
- Power Rangers: Mystic Force (2009–10)
- Power Rangers: Operation Overdrive (2009–10)
- Power Rangers RPM (2010–11)
- PrankStars (2013–15)
- Press Gang (2010)
- Pucca (2009)
- The Replacements (2010–11)
- Sally Bollywood: Super Detective (2013–17)
- Saturday Disney (2012–16)
- Sea Princesses (2013–14)
- Shake It Up (2012–16)
- Sonny with a Chance (2012–13)
- So Random! (2012, 2014–15)
- Spit It Out (2013–15)
- Stitch! (2012)
- Tashi (2014–15)
- Teenage Fairytale Dropouts (2013–17)
- Trapped (2013)
- Treasure Island (2010)
- Ultimate Spider-Man (2014–15)
- Victor and Hugo: Bunglers in Crime (2009–10)
- The Wild Adventures of Blinky Bill (2016–18, 2020)
- The Wind in the Willows (2009–11)
- Win, Lose or Draw (2015)
- Wizards of Waverly Place (2012–14)
- The Woodlies (2013–16)
- Woof! (2010)
- Yin Yang Yo! (2009–10, 2012)
- Zeke and Luther (2012–16)
- Zeke's Pad (2013)
- ZooMoo (2016–20)

=== Preschool ===
- All for Kids (2013)
- The Fairies (2012)
- Handy Manny (2010–12)
- Jay's Jungle (2015–19)
- Lah-Lah's Adventures (2014–16)
- Larry the Lawnmower (2015–18)
- Mickey Mouse Clubhouse (2009–12)
- Pipsqueaks (2013–20)
- Raggs (2011–12)
- Toybox (2013–20)

=== Comedy ===
- Alf
- Are You Being Served?
- As Time Goes By
- The Benny Hill Show
- Bewitched
- Big Bite
- Bless Me, Father
- Citizen Khan
- Dad's Army
- Designing Women
- Doctor at Large
- Doctor at Sea
- Doctor in Charge
- Father Ted
- Fawlty Towers
- The Fenn Street Gang
- Fortysomething
- Full House
- Gavin & Stacey (Season 1 only)
- George and Mildred
- Growing Pains
- Head of the Class
- I Dream of Jeannie
- Keeping Up Appearances
- Kingswood Country
- Love Thy Neighbour
- M*A*S*H
- Mad About You
- Man About the House
- Men Behaving Badly
- Mother and Son
- Murphy Brown
- One Foot in the Grave
- Perfect Strangers
- Please Sir!
- Samantha Who?
- Scrubs
- Some Mothers Do 'Ave 'Em
- Step By Step
- That '70s Show
- Ugly Betty
- Who's The Boss?

=== Documentary ===
- 10 Things You Didn't Know About...
- Beyond Tomorrow
- Chris Tarrant: Extreme Railways
- Coastwatch NZ
- Country Calendar
- The First 48
- Forensic Investigators
- Globe Trekker
- The Great Australian Doorstep
- I Shouldn't Be Alive
- In The Bush with Malcolm Douglas
- India with Sanjeev Bhaskar
- Infamous Assassinations
- Inside Maximum Security
- Life Inside the Markets
- Man Made Marvels
- Michael Palin's New Europe
- Olympians – Off the Record
- SCU: Serious Crash Unit
- Super Factories

=== Drama ===
- 24 (final season)
- A Place to Call Home
- All Saints
- Band of Brothers
- Between The Lines
- The Bill
- Black Sheep Squadron
- Blue Heelers
- Body of Proof
- Brothers & Sisters
- Castle
- Chicago Fire
- Cold Case
- Columbo
- Commander in Chief
- Criminal Minds
- Dangerfield
- Desperate Housewives
- Dirty Sexy Money
- Doctor Finlay
- Down to Earth
- Eli Stone
- Empire
- Five Mile Creek
- For Life
- Fortysomething
- Grey’s Anatomy
- Hart to Hart
- Heroes
- HolbyBlue
- How to Get Away with Murder
- In Justice
- Jonathan Creek
- Kingdom
- Kings
- Kojak
- The Lakes
- Lewis
- Life Begins
- Lost
- Magnum, P.I.
- Mercy
- Minder
- Mistresses
- Moonlighting
- Mr Selfridge
- Murder, She Wrote
- Once Upon a Time
- The Pacific
- Private Practice
- Revenge
- Royal Pains
- Shark
- The Shield
- Six Feet Under
- The Sopranos
- Stargate Atlantis
- The Unit
- Waking the Dead
- Without a Trace

=== Lifestyle ===
- Ainsley's Big Cook Out
- Antonio Carluccio's Southern Italian Feast
- Australia's Best Backyards
- Australia's Best Houses
- Beautiful Homes & Great Estates
- Chefs at Sea
- Ching's Kitchen
- Coastal Kitchen
- Coxy's Big Break
- Dinner in a Box
- Discover Tasmania
- Essence of Emeril
- The F Word (Australian TV Series)
- Fantasy Homes by the Sea
- Friends For Dinner
- Gardeners' World
- Gary Rhodes' Cookery Year
- Gary Rhodes' Local Food Heroes
- Giorgio Locatelli Pure Italian
- Going Bush
- The Great Outdoors
- The Hairy Bikers' Cookbook
- The Hook and the Cook
- Hot Property
- How Not to Decorate
- Intolerant Cooks
- James Martin: Yorkshire's Finest
- Jamie's Outdoor Room
- Lyndey Milan's Taste of Australia
- Make My Home Bigger
- The Martha Stewart Show
- Mercurio's Menu
- Restaurant Australia
- Room for Improvement
- SA Life Favourites
- The Travel Bug
- Travel Oz
- What's Up Downunder

=== Game shows ===
- Deal or No Deal
- The Master

=== Light entertainment ===
- Breaking the Magician's Code: Magic's Secrets Revealed
- Britain's Best Dish
- Club Reps
- The Emeril Lagasse Show
- I Survived a Japanese Game Show
- Kidspeak
- SellOut
- Where Are They Now?

=== Reality ===
- American Gladiators
- Animal Airport
- Animal Squad
- Beauty and the Geek Australia
- The Border
- Border Security USA
- Borderline
- Cheaters
- Dancing with the Stars Australia
- Destroyed in Seconds
- Disorderly Conduct: Caught on Tape
- Dog Patrol
- Dog Squad
- Downsize Me!
- Drug Bust
- Fifth Gear
- Four in a Bed
- Highway Patrol
- House Doctor
- Last Chance Learners
- Make Me A Supermodel US
- The Mole (second season)
- Monster Garage
- Monster House
- Neighbours at War
- The Real Seachange
- Restaurant Revolution
- Whacked Out Sports

=== Soap opera ===
- All My Children (2009–11)
- Coronation Street
- Emmerdale
- headLand
- Hollyoaks (2010–11)
- Home and Away: The Early Years (2009–17)
- Shortland Street
- Sons and Daughters

=== Sport ===
- The Davis Cup
- FINA World Swimming Championships
- Olympics on Seven
- Paralympics on Seven

=== Others ===
- Adventure Golf
- Ainsley's Gourmet Express
- America's Court with Judge Ross
- Animal Academy
- Around The World in Eighty Trades
- Australia's Wild Secrets
- Barry Humphries' Flashbacks
- Bazaar
- Cops, Cars and Superstars
- Cowboy Builders
- Escape to the Sun
- The Food Truck
- Human Body: Pushing the Limits
- The Jonathan Ross Show
- Journey of a Lifetime
- Leading The Way with Dr Michael Youssef
- Leyland Brothers' World
- Live Healthy, Be Happy
- Maigret
- McCallum
- Medical Rookies
- MegaStructures
- Mighty Ships
- Murphy's Law
- My Shocking Story
- The Naked Chef
- Naked City
- Nick's Bistro
- Night Court
- North
- Not Going Out
- NWA: On Fire
- One Foot in the Grave
- Only Fools And Horses
- Open All Hours
- Outback Wildlife Rescue
- Pelican's Progress
- The People's Cookbook
- Pie in the Sky
- Playing Tricks
- Prime Suspect
- The Professionals
- Ramsay's Boiling Point
- Rebus
- Rhodes Across India
- Rick Stein's Food Heroes
- Rick Stein's Seafood Lovers' Guide
- River City
- Rome
- Route 66
- The Royal
- Royal Upstairs Downstairs
- Ruth Rendell Mysteries
- Safari Chef
- Scotland Revealed
- Second Sight
- Seconds From Disaster
- Simply Baking
- Sophie's Sunshine Food
- South
- Street Cafe
- Strikeforce
- Style By Jury
- The Sweeney
- Taggart
- Take on the Takeaway
- Tamasin's Weekends
- The Tanner Brothers
- Taste
- That's My Boy
- Tin Man
- To The Manor Bowen
- Two's Company
- The Unit
- Upstairs, Downstairs
- Valerie / The Hogan Family
- Vera
- Vicious
- Wedding Planner
- What A Carry On!
- What About Brian
- When Weather Changed History
- The Whistleblowers
- Wild Harvest with Nick Nairn
- William and Mary (TV series)
- World's Toughest Fixes
- World War II: The Lost Films
- Wycliffe

=== News ===
From launch until early 2013, 7two re-aired all daytime and prime-time national Seven News updates, no more than two commercial breaks after their original broadcast on the main Seven channel. These were all produced in Seven's Sydney news studio and presented by either Chris Bath or Mark Ferguson.

On 5 August 2013, a national news bulletin began airing on 7two, titled Seven News at 7, airing at 7:00pm Monday to Friday. It was presented by Melissa Doyle, with David Brown on weather. Many months after the Nine Network's rival 7pm bulletin on 9Gem had ended, 7two aired their last Seven News At 7 bulletin on 2 May 2014.

=== Sport ===
Additional coverage of sports on 7two extends to equestrian racing events.

In 2010, 7two broadcast classic AFL and Australian Open tennis matches from the Seven archives between midnight and dawn.

7two televised live coverage of tennis tournament Wimbledon for the first time in 2011, first going to air at 8:30pm AEST on 7two whilst the primary channel continued normal programming before switching over to Seven at around 10.30pm. This practice has continued each year since.

Between 2012 and 2018, 7two televised smaller tennis tournaments from Seven's Summer of Tennis, including the Brisbane International, the Sydney International and the Kooyong Classic. This allowed Seven's main channel to continue with normal programming. From 2015 to 2018, 7two started providing secondary coverage of the Australian Open for the first week.

In August 2016, 7two broadcast the 2016 Summer Olympics and 2016 Summer Paralympics from Rio de Janeiro in September.

== Availability ==
7two is available in standard definition (in some areas) and also in high definition (in some areas) through Seven Network owned-and-operated stations including ATN Sydney (HD), HSV Melbourne (HD), BTQ Brisbane (HD), SAS Adelaide (HD), TVW Perth (HD), STQ Queensland (HD), Northern NSW & Gold Coast (HD), Southern NSW & ACT (HD), Regional Victoria (HD), Mildura (HD) and Western Australia (SD). As well as this, Seven also broadcasts the service through TNT Tasmania and TND Darwin. WIN Television Griffith launched 7two on 5 June 2012, the day of the analogue switch off. Seven in (Broken Hill and Spencer Gulf, Remote Central and Eastern Australia) began broadcasting in January 2012 and Regional WA soon followed.

== Logo and identity history ==
7two began transmission on 1 November 2009. Following the launch, the logo uses the generic Seven logo in an orange colour scheme, with the word "TWO" being added next to it. Despite the main logo being slightly changed in 2016, this logo is still in use as a secondary logo. On 24 January 2016, to coincide with new on-air presentation, 7TWO modified their 2009 logo slightly by downsizing the Seven logo.

On 24 July 2020, just days after 7mate's rebrand, 7TWO unveiled their new logo for the first time since its launch in 2009. The word "TWO" is now in a different font with the letters becoming lowercase to be now known as 7two. It was part of the Seven Network’s major rebrand of their multichannels.

1 November 2009 – 23 July 2020

24 July 2020 – present

== Slogans ==
- 2009–2010: It's Time
- 2010–2012: To Inspire, To Solve, To Laugh
- 2012–2016: You Belong
- 2016–2020: Can Do

== See also ==
- List of digital television channels in Australia
