= Ralph Brennan =

American restaurateur

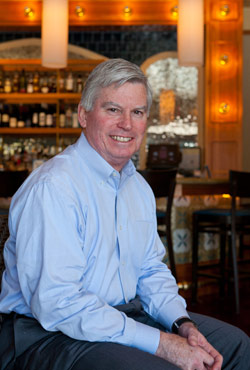
- Ralph at Cafe B
- Born: December 13, 1951 (age 74); New Orleans, Louisiana
- Education: Tulane University
- Culinary career
- Current restaurant(s): Red Fish Grill, Jazz Kitchen, Ralph's on the Park, Cafe NOMA, Ralph Brennan Catering & Events, Heritage Grill, Cafe B, Brennan's
- Website: www.neworleans-food.com

Ralph Brennan is a New Orleans–based restaurateur and head of The Ralph Brennan Restaurant Group.

A former CPA with Price Waterhouse & Company, Brennan entered the family business in the early 1980s as one of a group of eight third-generation cousins active in the United States restaurant industry. His company runs seven restaurants, six of which are in New Orleans, as well as a catering business. Among them:

- BACCO was an Italian restaurant in the French Quarter opened in 1991, closed 2010
- Red Fish Grill, also in the French Quarter, opened in 1997
- Ralph Brennan's Jazz Kitchen in Downtown Disney, Anaheim, California, as one of its original tenants in 2001
- Ralph's on the Park, adjacent to City Park in Mid-City New Orleans, opened in 2003
- Cafe NOMA located in the New Orleans Museum of Art in City Park, opened 2009
- Ralph Brennan Catering & Events, opened 2011
- Heritage Grill, located In Heritage Plaza on Veterans Blvd, opened 2011, closed 2018
- Cafe B, located on Metairie Road, opened 2011, closed 2018
- Brennan's Restaurant co-owner with Terry White, opened 2014
- Napoleon House, acquired May 2015

Brennan is co-owner of three additional restaurants:

- Mr. B's Bistro
- Commander's Palace
- Brennan's of Houston
