= Allison Vines-Rushing =

American chef and restaurateur

Allison Vines-Rushing is an American chef and, along with her husband Slade Rushing (also a chef), a co-owner of MiLa, a restaurant in New Orleans. They opened the restaurant in 2007, and her last day was September 13, 2014.

== Biography ==
Vines-Rushing, born in Louisiana, studied biology as an undergraduate at Florida State University. She then studied at the Institute of Culinary Education in New York City. She had externships at Brennan's and Gerrard’s, graduating in 2000.

== Career ==
Returning to NYC in 2001, Allison went to work at Picholine and Alain Ducasse before becoming the opening chef at Jack’s Luxury Oyster Bar in 2003.

She and her husband live in Broadmoor, New Orleans.

=== Restatements ===
The first restaurant they opened was in Abita Springs, Louisiana: a place called Longbramch. The opening was delayed due to Hurricane Katrina. The restaurant closed in 2007. They opened MiLa at the Renaissance Pere Marquette Hotel. When Allison and Slade decided it was time to move on, she had no immediate plans and Slade went on become executive chef at Brennan's.

She is working as a culinary consultant.

== Awards and honors ==
Vines-Rushing won the Rising Star Chef in 2004 at Jack's Luxury Oyster in New York City.
