= The Travel Bug =

Australian television series

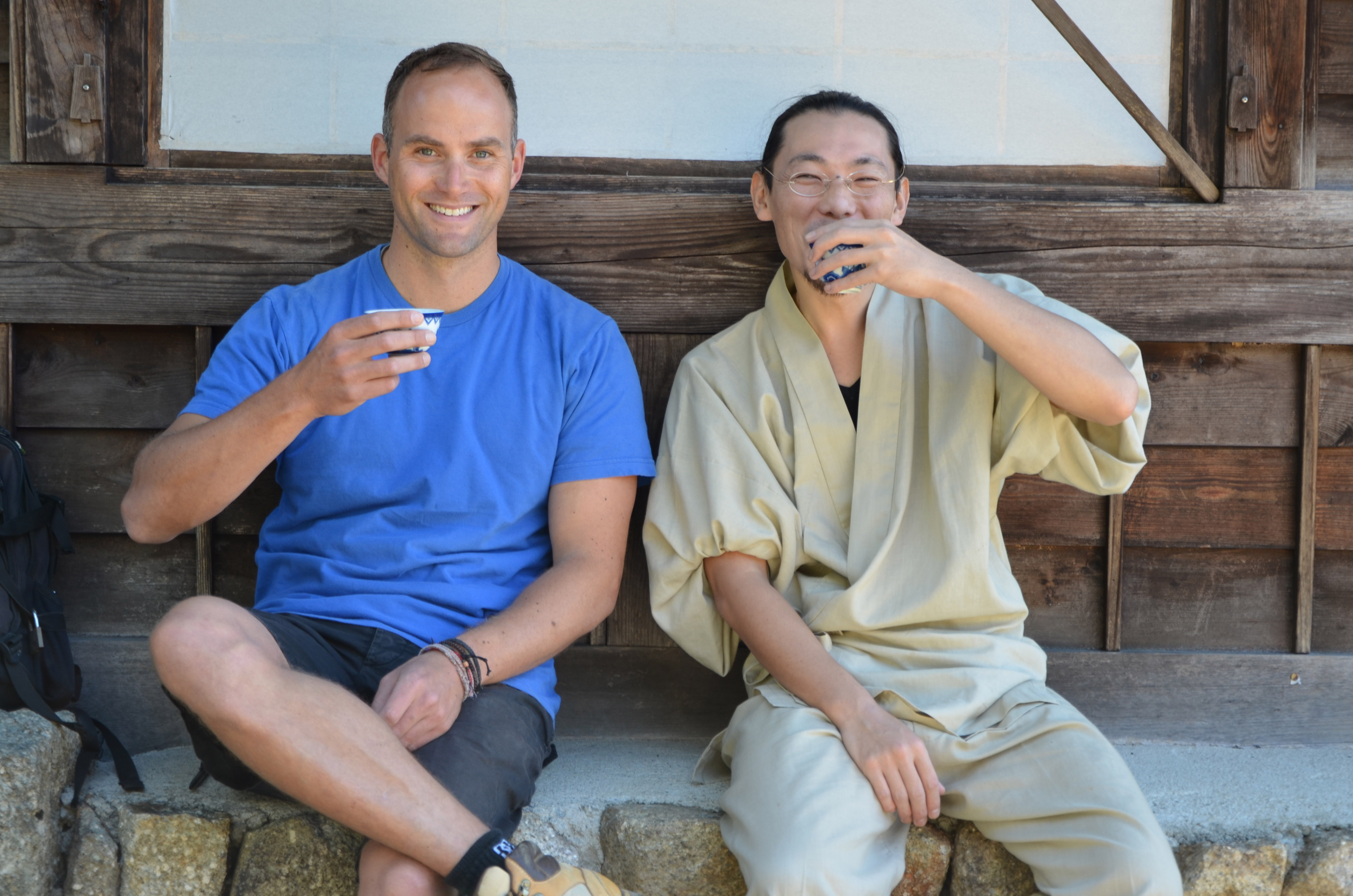
The Travel Bug presenter Morgan Burrett in Japan

The Travel Bug is an Australian made television series under the travel-documentary category. Production of series one commenced in 2009 and there are 6 series completed. The program is broadcast on 7TWO in Australia and distributed internationally by Off The Fence. The Travel Bug airs in many regions on various broadcasters, including Netflix, National Geographic and Al Jazeera. The host of the program is Morgan Burrett.

== Morgan Burrett ==
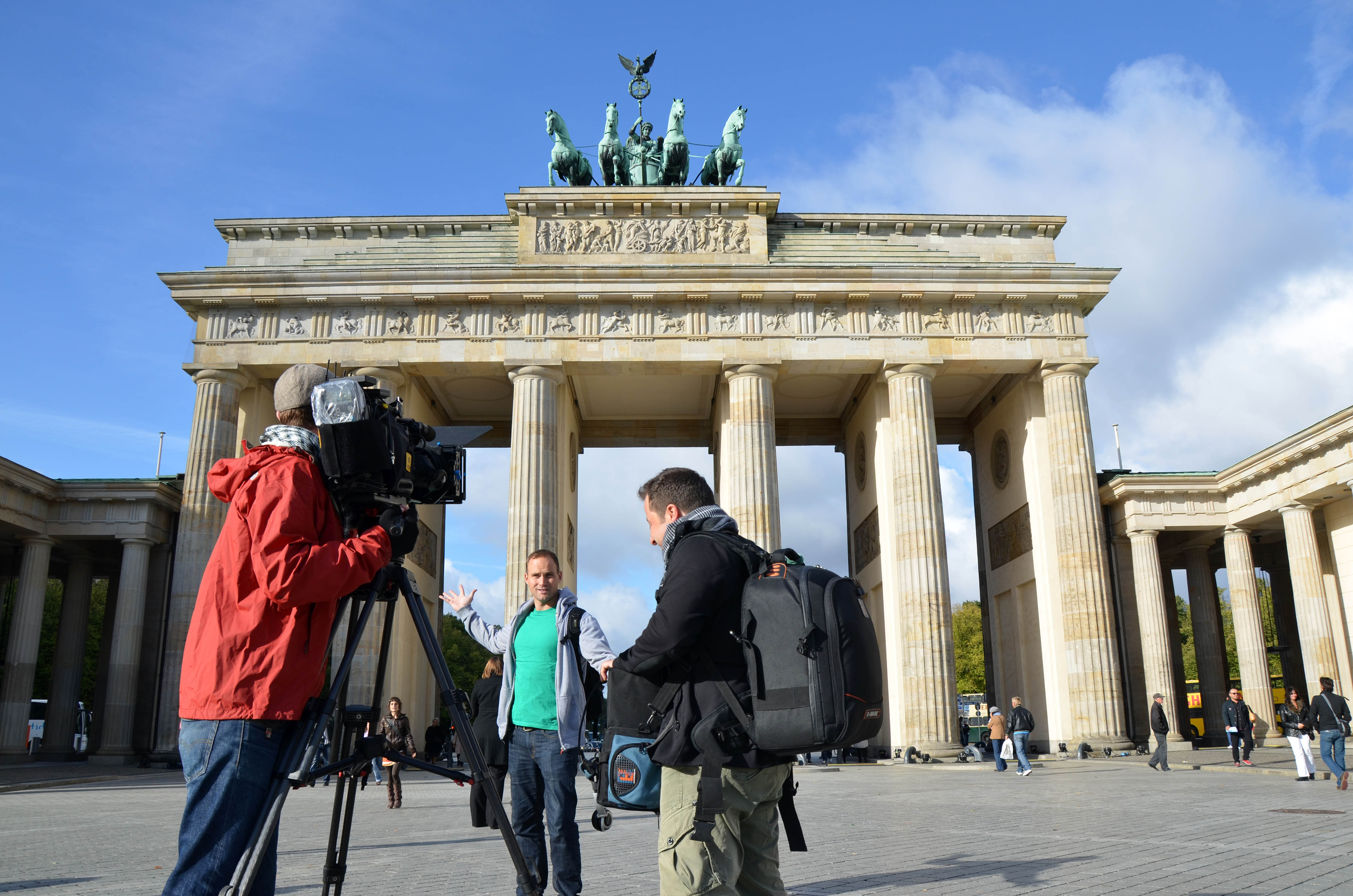
On location filming series three of The Travel Bug in Berlin

Morgan Burrett is a New Zealand-born television host of The Travel Bug TV series. Born on 15 May 1979 in Auckland, Morgan spent his formative years in New Zealand and studied Camera Operation and Lighting at South Seas Film And Television School.

Morgan's career began as a freelance cameraman working across commercials, documentary series, corporate videos and digital content. During this period he also began honing his skills in front of the camera as a television extra and in minor hosting roles. In 2009 Morgan began working as the presenter of the international television travel series The Travel Bug, a role that continues today.

Cast and Crew	
Production Company	The Rusty Cage
Executive Producers	David Byrne and Alex Begetis
Producer	David Byrne
Camera Operators	Andrew Grant, Andrew McClymont and Chris Byrne
Director	Alex Begetis
Presenter	Morgan Burrett
Colour Grading	Fluid Post
Audio Mixing	McCrocodile Audio
