= Emeril Lagasse =

American celebrity chef and restaurateur (born 1959)

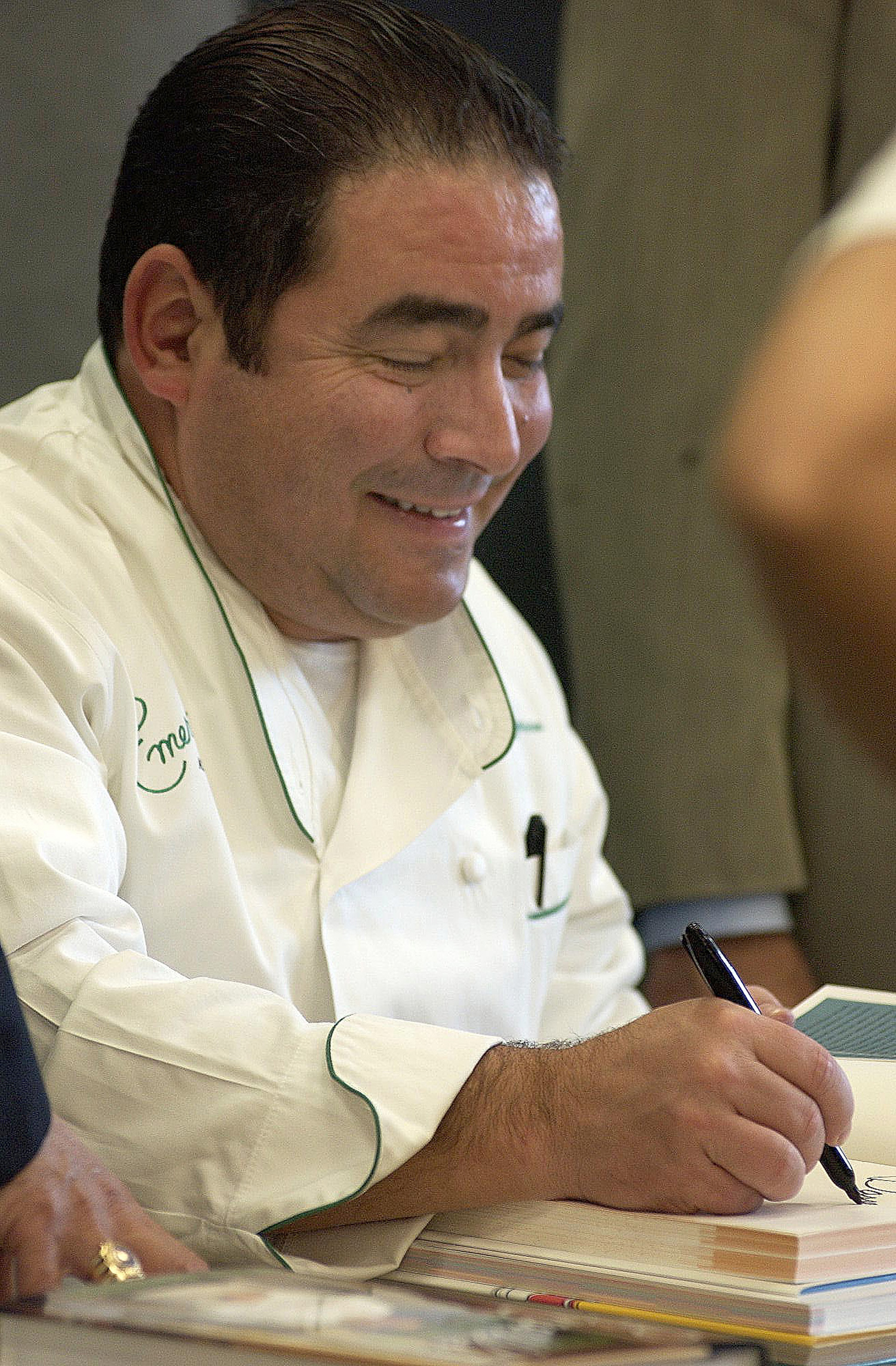
- Lagasse in 2006
- Born: Emeril John Lagassé III; October 15, 1959 (age 67); Fall River, Massachusetts, US
- Education: Diman Regional Voc Tech High School, and Johnson & Wales University
- Spouses: Elizabeth Kief (m. 1978; div. 1986) Tari Hohn (m. 1989; div. 1996) Alden Lovelace (m. 2000)
- Children: 4, including E. J.
- Culinary career
- Cooking style: Cajun, Portuguese, Creole, and French
- Current restaurants
- Emeril's Restaurant (New Orleans); Meril (New Orleans); Emeril's New Orleans Fish House (Las Vegas); Delmonico Steakhouse (Las Vegas); Emeril's Kitchen (New Orleans); Emeril's Table (New Orleans International Airport)
- Previous restaurants
- Lagasse Stadium (Las Vegas) (closed 2020); Nola Restaurant (New Orleans, Louisiana) (closed 2020); Emeril's Delmonico (New Orleans, Louisiana) (closed 2020); Emeril's (Bethlehem, Pennsylvania) (closed 2020); Burgers and More by Emeril (Bethlehem, Pennsylvania) (closed 2020); Emeril's Coastal Italian (Miramar Beach, Florida) (closed 2025)
- Television shows
- The Emeril Lagasse Show, Emeril Live, Essence of Emeril, Emeril Green, Emeril's Florida, On the Table, Eat the World with Emeril Lagasse, Emeril Forever Pans, Emeril's Must Have Non Stick Pans, Emeril's Homemade Pasta Secret, Emeril's Chicken Frying Secret, BAM!

Emeril John Lagasse III (/ˈɛmərəl ləˈɡɑːsi/ EM-ə-rəl lə-GAH-see; born October 15, 1959) is an American chef, restaurateur, television personality and cookbook author. He is a regional James Beard Award winner, known for his mastery of Creole and Cajun cuisine and his self-developed "New New Orleans" style. He is of Portuguese descent on his mother's side while being of French heritage through his father. He is the father of Chef E. J. Lagasse.

He has appeared on a wide variety of cooking television shows, including the long running Food Network shows Emeril Live and Essence of Emeril, and is associated with several catchphrases, including "Kick it up a notch!" and "Bam!". In 2005, Lagasse's portfolio of media, products, and restaurants was estimated to generate US$150 million annually in revenue.

== Early life ==
Emeril John Lagasse III was born on October 15, 1959, in Fall River, Massachusetts. His father, Emeril John Lagassé Jr., was French Canadian from the Province of Quebec, and his mother, Hilda Medeiros, was from Portugal. Lagasse stated that he "grew up very Catholic". Lagasse worked in a Portuguese bakery as a teenager where he discovered his talent for cooking and subsequently enrolled in a culinary arts program at Diman Regional Vocational Technical High School.

His talents as a percussionist earned him a scholarship to the New England Conservatory of Music, but he chose instead to attend Johnson & Wales University in hopes of becoming a chef. He graduated from Johnson & Wales in 1978. Many years later, the school awarded him an honorary doctorate.

== Career ==
Lagasse graduated from the culinary school at Johnson & Wales University in 1978 and became executive chef at the Dunfey's Hyannis Resort located on Cape Cod, Massachusetts in 1979. He was nominated as Chef of the Year in 1983.

In 1982, Lagasse succeeded Paul Prudhomme as executive chef of Commander's Palace in New Orleans under Richard Brennan, Sr. He led the kitchen there for seven and a half years before leaving to open his own restaurant.

In 1990, he opened Emeril's in New Orleans. It was designated "Restaurant of the Year" in Esquire magazine that year and has been a recipient of the Wine Spectator Grand Award since 1999. Many of his restaurants, as well as his corporate office, Emeril's Homebase, are located in New Orleans.

In August 2006, Lagasse contributed several recipes to the meal selection aboard the International Space Station, as part of a general NASA effort to improve the quality of the food supply for astronauts. Lagasse's cuisine in particular was selected in the hopes that the spicier fare would offset the reported tendency of microgravity to deaden flavors.

Lagasse's restaurant company, The Emeril Group, is located in New Orleans and houses restaurant operations, a culinary test kitchen for cookbook and recipe development, and a boutique store for his signature products. As of 2023, his company owns five restaurants.

In December 2022, Lagasse was named as the Chief Culinary Officer for Carnival Cruise Lines, which announced he would collaborate extensively on Carnival's fleetwide menu.

== Television and film appearances ==
=== Cooking shows ===
Lagasse first appeared on television on the show Great Chefs where he was featured on ten episodes, including Great Chefs, the Louisiana New Garde, New Orleans Jazz Brunch and Great Chefs — Great Cities. From 1993 to 1995 he was the original host of Food Network's How to Boil Water. After several appearances on several other Food Network programs, Lagasse hosted his own show, Essence of Emeril. "Essence" in the title refers to Emeril's Essence, the name of a spice blend of his own concoction that he frequently uses in his cooking, and which is commercially available in several flavors. He also often suggested that viewers of his show create their own spice blends that reflect their personal tastes and be unafraid to use them to customize the dishes he would teach.

In early 1997, Emeril Live began production. Later that year, the show won a Cable Ace Award for "Best Informational Show" of 1997.

Lagasse was one of sixteen chefs featured in the 1993 Julia Child series Cooking with Master Chefs.

He also appeared on Shop at Home Network (which, like Food Network, was owned by Scripps Networks), on the From Emeril's Kitchen from 2005 to 2006. The program was discontinued after Scripps liquidated Shop at Home's assets to Jewelry Television in June 2006.

On television, Lagasse is known for his light and jovial hosting style as well as several catchphrases, including "Bam!". Emeril's signature catchphrase began simply as a means of keeping his studio crew awake, alert and focused. When Emeril first began at Food Network, he would tape seven shows a day, from seven in the morning until two in the afternoon. The interjection soon proved a hit with viewers. "Kick it up a notch", "Aw, yeah, babe" and "Feel the love", are usually said before or after adding something spicy to a dish, or after the reaction to adding something. When frying or making dishes like sausage, Lagasse advocated using genuine lard, boasting, "Pork fat rules!" This style developed fully, and Lagasse became more comfortable when a live studio audience was added in the change from Essence of Emeril to Emeril Live.

Lagasse hosted a daily series, Emeril Green, which aired on Discovery Channel's eco-lifestyle network Planet Green. The show focused on cooking with organic, locally grown and seasonal produce, and was filmed on location at Whole Foods Markets across the United States.

From April to July 2010, Lagasse hosted the weekly variety program The Emeril Lagasse Show, which aired on Sundays on Ion Television.

In September 2011, he hosted the Hallmark Channel show, Emeril's Table. It was cancelled after one season. In 2013, Lagasse began hosting the Cooking Channel show Emeril's Florida. The show aired for five seasons, from 2013 to 2017.

Starting in 2022, Lagasse hosted the series Emeril Cooks on The Roku Channel. He also hosted the series Emeril Tailgates for The Roku Channel.

=== Culinary travel show ===
Emeril now hosts Eat the World with Emeril Lagasse on Amazon Prime Video produced by Ugly Brother Studios. Its first season was released for streaming on September 9, 2016. In 2017 the show won a Daytime Emmy Award for Outstanding Culinary Program as well as for Single-Camera Editing The television show features Emeril and internationally known chefs such as Angela Dimayuga, Danny Bowien, Mario Batali, Aarón Sánchez, José Andrés and others, traveling the world and trying local favorites.

=== Cooking competition shows ===
In 2009, Lagasse joined Bravo's Top Chef as a judge. He also was a guest judge during season 9 of Top Chef: Texas in 2011 and joined the judges' table for seasons 10 and 11 in Seattle and New Orleans, respectively. During season 11 of Top Chef: New Orleans, Emeril's Restaurant was the featured location and the episode's winning dish was featured on the menu at the restaurant.

Lagasse teamed with fellow Food Network personality Mario Batali in a tag battle against Bobby Flay and White House executive chef Cristeta Comerford on an episode of Iron Chef America which aired on January 2, 2010.

Lagasse served as the "Menu Master" of the TNT cooking competition show On the Menu, which ran for one season in 2014. The show was hosted by Ty Pennington.

=== Acting ===
In 1996, Lagasse was a guest on the animated show Space Ghost Coast to Coast, where he and other chefs, including Martin Yan, prepared meals for Space Ghost.

Lagasse briefly starred on Emeril, a TV sitcom on NBC during the 2001 fall season with Robert Urich, in which he played a fictionalized version of himself. It was canceled after eleven episodes.

He provides the voice of a hot-tempered alligator named Marlon the Gator in the 2009 New Orleans-set Disney film The Princess and the Frog. (Note: Marlon is identified by co-director John Musker in the DVD's audio commentary as the alligator who tells Prince Naveen (then in the form of a frog) "You're gonna taste so good basted, battered and fried!")

In 2006, Lagasse appears as himself in the film Last Holiday, starring Queen Latifah. He is featured as the cooking inspiration to her character and appears in the final scene.

In 2012, Lagasse appeared as himself on an episode of the HBO drama series Treme. Lagasse's scene was written by fellow chef (and Treme writer) Anthony Bourdain, who stated afterward that writing the scene was "a dream" for him because it showed a sadder, more burdened side of Lagasse, which existed in real life but was rarely shown in his television appearances.

=== Other ===
In 1998, he became a food correspondent for ABC's Good Morning America, which he continues today.

Lagasse acted as Grand Marshal of the 2008 Tournament of Roses Parade and presided over the nationally telecast coin-toss before the game wearing a business suit—a rarity for Lagasse who is normally attired in chef's garb.

He made a guest appearance on Jon & Kate Plus 8 during the show's 5th season to help celebrate its 100th episode in May 2009.

Lagasse has appeared on the Home Shopping Network and QVC.

== Philanthropy and activism ==
The Emeril Lagasse Foundation, founded in 2002, supports non-profit organizations and educational initiatives that create opportunities for children, especially for those from disadvantaged circumstances, to realize their full potential.

Emeril Lagasse Foundation has distributed more than $6 million in grants for children's charities. Projects funded by the Foundation include an outdoor classroom, gardens, fresh foods cafeteria and teaching kitchen at Edible Schoolyard New Orleans and the Orlando Junior Academy's Edible Schoolyard as well as a new culinary kitchen house, an accessible learning kitchen for special needs students at St. Michael Special School, a four-year culinary arts program for high school students at New Orleans Center for Creative Arts, the Emeril Lagasse Foundation Hospitality Center at Café Reconcile, and hospitality training at Liberty's Kitchen for at-risk youth preparing healthy school meals. Each fall, the foundation hosts its signature annual fundraiser, Carnivale du Vin, which ranks among the Top Ten U.S. Charity Wine Auctions in Wine Spectator magazine. The Foundation introduced the charity indoor/outdoor food and music fest Boudin, Bourbon & Beer in 2011. In 2013, Lagasse was honored as James Beard Foundation Humanitarian of the Year.

In 2010, Lagasse appeared in a commercial to raise awareness of the Deepwater Horizon oil spill. Also starring in the commercial were Sandra Bullock, Peyton and Eli Manning, Jack Del Rio, Drew Brees, James Carville, Blake Lively, and John Goodman.

== Cuisine ==
Lagasse's style of cooking is called "New New Orleans", which uses local Louisiana ingredients in his own interpretation of Creole cuisine, strongly influenced by Asian, Portuguese, Southwestern, and other cultures which themselves influence New Orleans cuisine. However, the styles of cuisine at Lagasse's restaurants are not all the same. Delmonico Steakhouse at The Venetian in Las Vegas is a classic steakhouse with a Creole flair, and Emeril's Coastal Italian serves seafood-heavy, Italian-inspired fare.

== Merchandising and endorsements ==
Lagasse has a wide range of branded products. On June 8, 2000, he signed a deal with B&G Foods to create a line of dry grocery products marketed under the label "Emeril's." The product line includes pasta sauces, marinades, salsas, and Lagasse's signature "Essence" spice blend. In 2004 he lent his name to a line of fresh produce made by Pride of San Juan, branded "Emeril's Gourmet Produce".

Lagasse also has two lines of kitchen knives produced by Wüsthof and cookware made by All-Clad, as well as a line of kitchen electrical appliances made by T-Fal.

On February 19, 2008, Martha Stewart Living Omnimedia announced it had acquired the rights to all Emeril products including cookware, cookbooks, television shows, and food products in a $50 million agreement. Lagasse retains rights to his restaurants and corporate offices.

== Personal life ==
Lagasse met his first wife, Elizabeth Kief, while working at the Venus De Milo Restaurant in Swansea, Massachusetts. They had two children, and later divorced. Lagasse married for the second time to a fashion designer, Tari Hohn; they had no children and later divorced. Lagasse was married a third time on May 13, 2000, to real estate broker, Alden Lovelace. He and Lovelace had two children. In 2011, Lagasse and his family moved to Destin, Florida. His son with Lovelace, E. J. Lagasse, became a chef, taking over his father’s flagship restaurant Emeril's in New Orleans in 2023 at the age of 19.

Lagasse's mother, Hilda Medeiros Lagasse, died on August 24, 2016. His father, Emeril Jr., died in March 2024.

== Cookbooks ==
Lagasse has written cookbooks including:

- New New Orleans Cooking (1993)
- Louisiana Real and Rustic (1996)
- Emeril's Creole Christmas (1997)
- Emeril's TV Dinners (1998)
- Every Day's a Party (1999)
- Prime Time Emeril (2001)
- Emeril's There's a Chef in My Soup!: Recipes for the Kid in Everyone (2002)
- From Emeril's Kitchens: Favorite Recipes from Emeril's Restaurants (2003)
- Emeril's There's a Chef in My Family!: Recipes to Get Everybody Cooking (2004)
- Emeril's Potluck: Comfort Food with a Kicked-Up Attitude (2004)
- Emeril's Delmonico: A Restaurant with a Past (2005)
- Emeril's There's a Chef in My World!: Recipes That Take You Places (2006)
- Emeril 20-40-60: Fresh Food Fast (2009)
- Emeril at the Grill: A Cookbook for All Seasons (2009)
- Farm to Fork: Cooking Local, Cooking Fresh (2010)
- Sizzling Skillets and Other One-Pot Wonders (2011)
- Emeril's Kicked-Up Sandwiches: Stacked with Flavor (2012)
- Emeril's Cooking with Power: 100 Delicious Recipes Starring Your Slow Cooker, Multi Cooker, Pressure Cooker, and Deep Fryer (2013)
- Essential Emeril: Favorite Recipes and Hard-Won Wisdom from My Life in the Kitchen (2015)

== Restaurants ==
Lagasse is the chef or proprietor of the following restaurants:

- New Orleans: Emeril's New Orleans, Meril, Emeril's Table, Emeril’s Kitchen at Caesar’s New Orleans
- Las Vegas: Emeril's New Orleans Fish House at MGM Grand, Delmonico Steakhouse at The Venetian
- Carnival Cruise Lines: Emeril's Bistro 1396 aboard the Carnival Mardi Gras, Emeril's Bistro 1397 aboard the Carnival Celebration, and Emeril's Bistro 717 aboard the Carnival Jubilee.

Former restaurants of his include:

- Orlando: Emeril's Tchoup Chop (2003-2017)
- Las Vegas: Table 10 (2007-2017)
- Emeril's Orlando (1999-2018)
- Emeril's Pittsburgh (2003-2004)
- Lagasse's Stadium (2009-2020)
- Gulfport, MS: Emeril's Gulf Coast Fish House (2007-2010)
- Miramar Beach, FL: Emeril’s Coastal Italian (2017-2025)
- New Orleans, LA: Emeril’s Delmonico (1998-2022)
- New Orleans, LA: NOLA Restaurant (1992-2020)
- New Orleans, LA: 34 Restaurant and Bar (2024-2026)
- Bethlehem, Pennsylvania: Emeril's Chop House, BAM (Burgers and More by Emeril), and Emeril's Fish House, all at the Wind Creek Bethlehem

== Awards and honors ==
- Two-time James Beard Foundation Award winner:
  - Best Southeast Regional Chef, 1991
  - Humanitarian of the Year, 2013
- Chef of the Year, GQ magazine, 1998
- Most Intriguing People of the Year, People magazine, 1998
- Executive of the Year, Restaurants & Institutions magazine, 2004
- Distinguished Service Award, Wine Spectator, 2005
- Gaming Hall of Fame, inducted 2008
- Lifetime Achievement Award, The Food Network, 2009
- Taste Hall of Fame, Taste Awards, 2013
- Lifetime Achievement Award, Taste Awards, 2014
- Daytime Emmy Award for Outstanding Culinary Program, Eat the World with Emeril Lagasse, 2017

== In popular culture ==
- Futurama parodies Emeril Lagasse with the recurring character Elzar, a four-armed alien celebrity chef with the catchphrase, "Knock it up a notch".
- In the short "Kenny and the Chimp", Kenny catches swine flu until he and Chimpy find a box on the wall that reads, "In case of Swine Flu". They open it, and a chef resembling Emeril Lagasse comes out and says, "Bam! Look at that bacon sizzle!" scaring the disease away.
- In The Office episode "Casino Night", Michael says to Jan "Bam!", the chef's catchphrase.
- Family Guy parodies Emeril in the season 4 episode "The Cleveland-Loretta Quagmire", when Peter tells Cleveland he was cheated on, the celebrity chef uses his catchphrase "Bam!"
- On Whammy! The All-New Press Your Luck, one of the skits when a contestant hits a Whammy includes a Whammy chef emptying a money bag filled with banknotes by pounding it with a meat tenderizer using Lagasse's catchphases "Kick it up a notch" and "Bam!".
