= SellOut =

- Genre: Game Show
- Presented by: Michael Pope
- Country of origin: Australia
- Original language: English
- No. of seasons: 1
- No. of episodes: 20

Production
- Running time: 30 minutes

Original release
- Network: 7TWO
- Release: 22 September – 17 October 2014

SellOut is an Australian daytime game show series which airs on 7TWO on 22 September 2014. It's hosted by Michael Pope. The show pits a pair of contestants against each other for the chance to win prizes. These same prizes can then be purchased by the shows viewers.
