= The Emeril Lagasse Show =

US talk show

- Genre: Talk show
- Starring: Emeril Lagasse
- Country of origin: United States
- Original language: English

Production
- Producer: Tyler Gamester
- Production location: New York City
- Running time: 60 minutes

Original release
- Network: Ion Television
- Release: April 18, 2010 – July 2010

The Emeril Lagasse Show is a weekly talk show starring Emeril Lagasse. It aired on Sundays at 5:00PM Eastern on Ion Television. The program originally premiered on April 18, 2010, airing at 8:00PM.

The announcement of the show was made by Emeril on Martha in late January 2010. The show was filmed live before a studio audience and has featured a similar format of Emeril Live and also featured celebrities making guest appearances. A band plays music and interact with Lagasse and guests, plus the show has featured field pieces shot in and around New York City where the show was taped.

The show featured house band Dave Koz & The Kozmos, featuring Dave Koz (saxophone), Jeff Golub (guitar), Philippe Saisse (keyboards), Conrad Korsch (bass guitar), and Skoota Warner (drums).

This was Ion Television's first American original show since its short-lived original drama Palmetto Pointe in 2005 (when Ion was known as i: Independent Television). For reasons unknown, it was cancelled in July 2010.
