= Flushed (game show) =

- Genre: Game show
- Presented by: Shae Brewster (series 1); Candice Dixon (series 2 to 3)
- Country of origin: Australia
- Original language: English
- No. of seasons: 3
- No. of episodes: 195

Production
- Running time: 22 minutes
- Production company: SLR Productions

Original release
- Network: 7two (2015-2016); Seven Network (2017)
- Release: 16 March 2015 – 29 September 2017

Flushed is an Australian children's game show by SLR Productions. It aired for two seasons from 16 March 2015 to 5 August 2016 on 7two. The show moved to Seven Network for the third and final season on 3 July 2017. The host for the first season was Shae Brewster; she was replaced by Candice Dixon for the final two seasons.
