= Joe Langhan =

- Born: 1950 (age 74–75)
- Occupation: Businessman

Joe Langhan (born 1950) is one of the founders of the Food Network. Langhan served as Executive Producer after conceiving of the concept as part of the management team at The Providence Journal. Langhan created Emeril Live, the Food Network's signature show during its first decade, as well as Cooking Live with Sara Moulton.
