= Paul Prudhomme =

American chef (1940–2015)

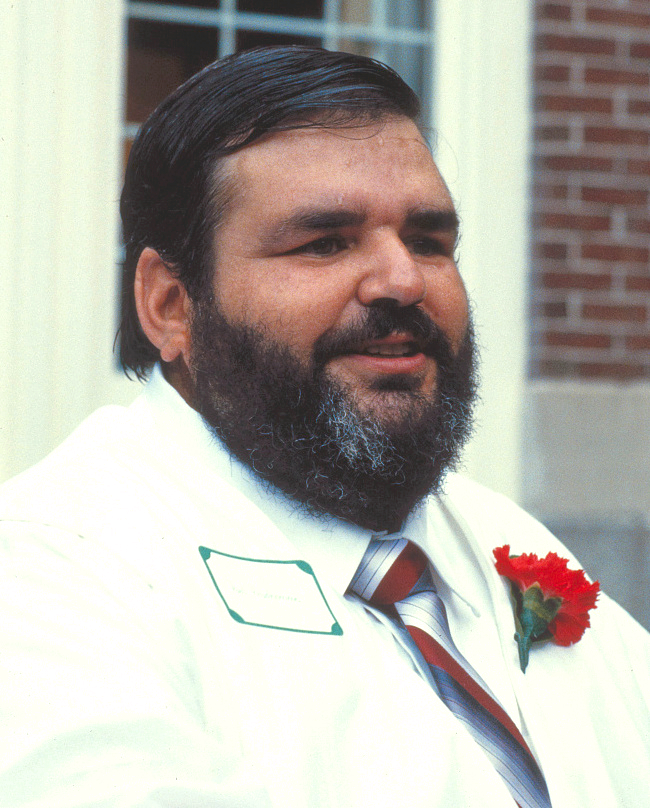
- Prudhomme in 1983
- Born: July 13, 1940; Opelousas, Louisiana, U.S.
- Died: October 8, 2015 (aged 75); New Orleans, Louisiana, U.S.
- Spouses: Kay Hinrichs (died 1993) Lori Bennett (m. 2010)
- Culinary career
- Cooking style: Cajun cuisine, Louisiana Creole cuisine
- Previous restaurant(s): K-Paul's Louisiana Kitchen (New Orleans) Big Daddy O's Patio
- Television show(s): Fork in the Road (1995) Fiery Foods (1996) Kitchen Expedition (1997) Louisiana Kitchen (1998) Always Cooking (2007)
- Website: www.chefpaul.com

Paul Prudhomme (July 13, 1940 – October 8, 2015), also known as Gene Autry Prudhomme, was an American celebrity chef whose specialties were Creole and Cajun cuisines, which he was also credited with popularizing. He was the chef proprietor of K-Paul's Louisiana Kitchen in New Orleans, and had formerly owned and run several other restaurants. He developed several culinary products, including hot sauce and seasoning mixes, and wrote 11 cookbooks.

== Early life ==
The youngest of 13 children born to Eli Prudhomme, Jr. and Hazel Reed, Prudhomme was raised on a farm near Opelousas, the seat of Saint Landry Parish, Louisiana. His father was a farmer, who struggled financially during Prudhomme's childhood, and his mother was a creative cook.

Previously named after Saint Paul, as chosen by a Catholic priest, Prudhomme adopted the pseudonym "Gene Autry Prudhomme" during his youth.

His maternal ancestors include early Acadian settlers Martin Aucoin (c. 1651 – 1711) and Marie Gaudet (c. 1657 – 1734).

== Career ==
Prudhomme opened his first restaurant in Opelousas in 1957, a hamburger restaurant called Big Daddy O's Patio. The restaurant went out of business in nine months, during which time his first marriage also ended. He became a magazine seller initially in New Orleans, and afterward several restaurant jobs took him around the country. During this period he began creating his own spice mixes and giving them away to customers. In 1970, he moved back to New Orleans to work as a sous chef at Le Pavillon Hotel. He soon left to open Clarence Dupuy's restaurant Maison du Puy. While there, he met his second wife, Kay Hinrichs, who worked at the restaurant as a waitress. In 1975, Prudhomme left to become the first American-born executive chef at Commander's Palace under Richard Brennan, Sr. Chef Paul turned the Garden District restaurant into a world-class destination.

In 1979, Prudhomme and Kay opened K-Paul's Louisiana Kitchen in the French Quarter of New Orleans. The restaurant was named as a portmanteau of their names, with Paul working as head chef and Kay as restaurant manager. For a while he attempted to operate the restaurant while still working at Commander's Palace, but the demand in his new restaurant was such that he moved to work there full-time, while also appointing Emeril Lagasse to take over as executive chef at Commanders Palace. In 1980, Prudhomme was made a Chevalier (Knight) of the French Ordre National du Mérite Agricole in honor of his work with Cajun and Creole cuisines.

His cookbook, Paul Prudhomme's Louisiana Kitchen, was published by William Morrow and Company in 1984. It was given a Culinary Classic Book Award in 1989 by the International Association of Culinary Professionals. Prudhomme has been credited with having popularized cajun cuisine and in particular blackened redfish during the 1980s. The popularity of the fish was such that commercial fishing of the species was restricted to prevent its extinction. Prudhomme was also credited with introducing the turducken into American cuisine.

During a summer residence in New York City in 1985, Prudhomme's pop-up restaurant was reported to the Board of Health, which visited the restaurant and closed it before it opened, reporting 29 violations of the city's health code. Prudhomme ignored the order and opened the restaurant anyway, resulting in the Board of Health threatening him with jail time if he continued to operate the restaurant. The city's mayor Ed Koch appeared with Prudhomme at the restaurant to declare an end to what the media reported as the "gumbo war". The restaurant was quite successful during the five weeks it was open, with lines sometimes reaching four blocks long. Four years later, Prudhomme opened a permanent restaurant in New York City at 622 Broadway, which had queues of up to two hours.

In 1992, he was charged with possession of a weapon while trying to board a plane at Baltimore/Washington International Airport after leaving a loaded revolver in his carry-on luggage. He later released a press statement saying that he had forgotten it was in the bag.

He made a guest appearance at Le Cordon Bleu cooking school in Paris, France, in October 1994.

In 2004, he traveled to Guantanamo Bay Naval Base in Cuba, along with 4,000 pounds (1,800 kg) of food and seasonings to cook for the troops stationed there.

Following Hurricane Katrina in August 2005, Prudhomme was forced to close his restaurant. During the restoration efforts, he cooked for free at a relief center for the military and residents staying in the French Quarter; at one point his team cooked over 6,000 meals in ten days. He reopened the restaurant during the following October; the premises were not extensively damaged by the storm. Bon Appétit awarded Prudhomme their Humanitarian Award in 2006 for his efforts following the hurricane.

After his death in 2015, Prudhomme's personal library of nearly 600 cookbooks, food reference books and technical books on food science was donated to the John and Bonnie Boyd Hospitality and Culinary Library, which is affiliated with the Southern Food and Beverage Museum.

== Product lines ==
Along with being a chef, Prudhomme launched a range of products called Chef Paul Prudhomme Magic Seasoning Blends. The line includes his signature blackened redfish seasonings. The products are sold throughout the U.S. and in over 30 countries worldwide. In 1986, he released two volumes of a "video cookbook" on VHS titled Chef Paul Prudhomme's Louisiana Kitchen.

== Personal life ==
In 1986, Prudhomme's wife, Kay, was diagnosed with lung cancer. She died seven years later on December 31, 1993.

One of his students was Aarón Sánchez, who moved from New York to become an apprentice when Sanchez was 16.

Prudhomme had a long-running issue with his weight, resulting in his working from an electric wheelchair on occasion. In order to lose weight, he wrote his 1993 cookbook, Chef Paul Prudhomme's Fork in the Road. He deliberately avoided marketing it as a low-fat cookbook in order to prevent customers from being put off by the premise after testing the recipes at K-Paul's Kitchen in New Orleans.

In March 2008, Prudhomme was grazed by a .22-caliber stray bullet while catering the Zurich Classic of New Orleans golf tournament. He at first thought a bee had stung his arm, required no serious medical attention and within five minutes was back to cooking for the golf tournament. It was thought to have been a falling bullet.

Prudhomme died in New Orleans on October 8, 2015, after a brief illness. He was 75.

== Books and shows ==
=== Cookbooks ===
- Chef Paul Prudhomme's Louisiana Kitchen (April 1984) ISBN 0-688-02847-0
- The Prudhomme Family Cookbook (September 1987) ISBN 0-688-07549-5
- Authentic Cajun Cooking (1984–1989) booklet for Tabasco
- Chef Paul Prudhomme's Louisiana Cajun Magic (September 1989) ISBN 0-517-68642-2
- Chef Paul Prudhomme's Seasoned America (October 1991) ISBN 0-688-05282-7
- Chef Paul Prudhomme's Fork in the Road (October 1993) ISBN 0-688-12165-9
- Chef Paul Prudhomme's Pure Magic (June 1995) ISBN 0-688-14202-8
- Chef Paul Prudhomme's Fiery Foods That I Love (November 1995) ISBN 0-688-12153-5
- Chef Paul Prudhomme's Kitchen Expedition (July 1997) ISBN 0-9656348-0-9
- Chef Paul Prudhomme's Louisiana Tastes (February 2000) ISBN 0-688-12224-8
- Chef Paul Prudhomme's Always Cooking (January 2007) ISBN 0-9791958-0-2

=== Videos ===
- Louisiana Kitchen: Vol. 1: Cajun Blackened Redfish (October 1986)
- Louisiana Kitchen: Vol. 2: Cajun & Creole Classics (October 1990)
- Biography: Paul Prudhomme: Cajun Sensation (December 2009)

=== Television ===
Prudhomme made five seasons of cooking shows for New Orleans' PBS affiliate WYES-TV.

- Fork in the Road (26 episodes, 1995)
- Fiery Foods (26 episodes, 1996)
- Kitchen Expedition (26 episodes, 1997)
- Louisiana Kitchen (26 episodes, 1998)
- Always Cooking (26 episodes, 2007)

Prudhomme also hosted short segments called The Magic of Chef Paul which were syndicated to news stations across the country. Each segment ended with his catchphrase, "Good cooking, good eating, good loving!"
