= What's Up Downunder =

- Genre: Travel documentary
- Created by: Col Parrôt
- Presented by: Craig "Macca" McGown, Tania Kernaghan, Angie Hilton, Robby Nethercote
- Theme music composer: Sunny Hawkings, James Manson
- Country of origin: Australia
- Original language: English
- No. of series: 10
- No. of episodes: 294 (as at end of 2019)

Production
- Executive producers: Warren Parrôt; Col Parrôt
- Production location: All over Australia
- Running time: 30 minutes
- Production company: Parable Productions

Original release
- Network: Seven Network (2010–2011); Network Ten (2012–present)
- Release: 27 March 2010 – present

What's Up Downunder is an Australian travel television show that airs on Network Ten and One. It debuted in 2010 for two seasons on the Seven Network and its digital channel 7two before swapping networks in 2012. The series has spawned print and digital magazines along with a vast range of websites promoting and highlighting the caravan and camping lifestyle.

== Cast ==
The original 2010 cast featured Frankie J. Holden, with wife Michelle & daughter Georgia acting as his travelling companions. From 2017, it features Craig "Macca" McGown, Angie Hilton, Tania Kernaghan, Robby Nethercote and Jessica Stafford-Ewing. in 2026, Ariarne Titmus became the host.
