= Dickie Brennan's Steakhouse =

Coordinates: 29.9543°N 90.0687°W

Restaurant information
- Owner: Brennan family
- Location: 716 Iberville St., French Quarter of New Orleans, Louisiana, United States
- Website: www.dickiebrennanssteakhouse.com

Dickie Brennan's Steakhouse is a steakhouse located in the French Quarter of New Orleans, Louisiana. The restaurant is part of the Dickie Brennan Family of restaurants and has received various awards from publications such as Playboy Magazine and Maxim Magazine. Dickie Brennan's Steakhouse has also been featured in The Wall Street Journal.

It was established by Richard "Dick" Brennan Sr. and is operated by his son, Richard "Dickie" Brennan Jr.
