= Brennan's =

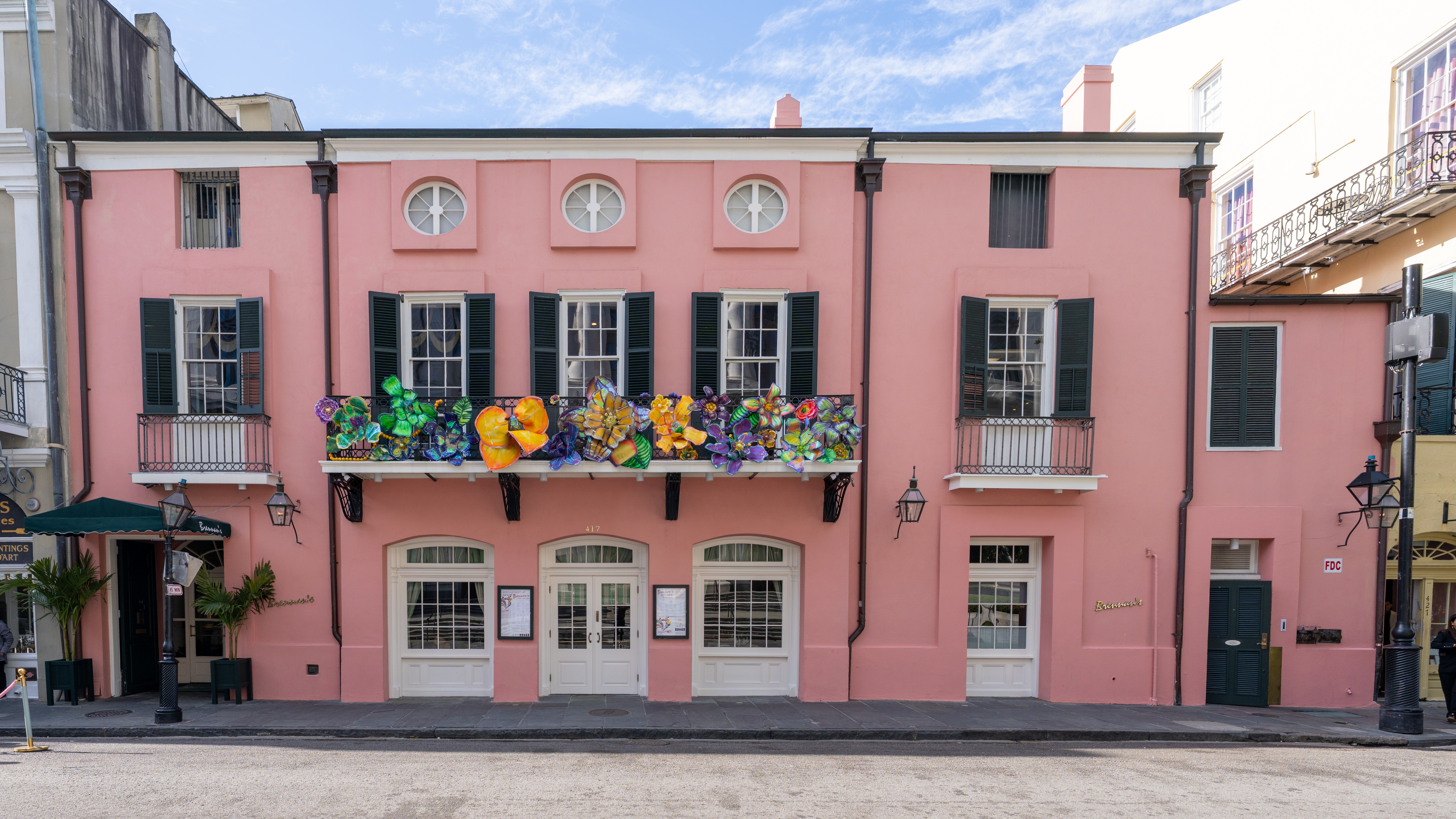
- Brennan's on Royal Street (2026)
- Interactive map of Brennan's

Restaurant information
- Established: 1946
- Owner: Ralph Brennan
- Head chef: Kris Padalino
- Food type: Modern New Orleans Cooking
- Location: 417 Royal Street, French Quarter of New Orleans, Louisiana, United States
- Coordinates: 29.9561°N 90.0665°W
- Website: Official Site

Owen Edward Brennan Sr.
- Born: April 5, 1910; New Orleans, Louisiana, US
- Died: November 5, 1955 (aged 45); New Orleans, Louisiana
- Occupations: Restaurateur: Owen Brennan's French & Creole Restaurant
- Spouse: Maude Brennan
- Children: Owen Edward Brennan Jr. James Brennan; Theodore Brennan
- Parent(s): Owen Patrick Sr., and Nellie Valentine Brennan
- Relatives: Richard Brennan Sr. (brother); Ella Brennan (sister)

Brennan's is a Creole restaurant in the French Quarter of New Orleans, Louisiana. It was founded in 1946 by Owen Brennan.

== Owen Brennan ==
Owen Edward Brennan Sr. (April 5, 1910 – November 4, 1955), was a restaurateur in his native New Orleans, Louisiana.

Brennan was born to Owen Patrick Brennan (1886-1958) and the former Nellie Valentine. As the oldest of six children, Brennan felt the need to support his family from a young age. He and his wife, Maude, had three sons, Owen Jr., James, and Theodore. Determined to do well for himself, Brennan in 1943 purchased the Old Absinthe House on Bourbon Street. He became well known throughout the city as a host to his customers. Spurred by a challenge from a friend, Brennan in July 1946 opened Owen Brennan's French & Creole Restaurant, which became more commonly known as the Vieux Carre.

Brennan employed members of his family for different positions within the business. The restaurant flourished as it gained many regular customers. The dish Bananas Foster was created at his restaurant. In 1954, however, when it became time for Brennan to renew his lease, his landlord demanded 50 percent of the profit from the restaurant. Unwilling to let that happen, Owen moved his restaurant to Royal street and converted an old building into the new and improved Brennan's Restaurant. Unfortunately Brennan did not see his restaurant open to the public. He died in his sleep on November 4, 1955, from a massive heart attack at the age of forty-five. The restaurant opened the following spring.

Along with being a successful restaurant owner, Owen Brennan also was the founding father of the Krewe of Bacchus, which he launched in 1949. Brennan had realized that many of his clients were unhappy tourists coming for Mardi Gras because at the time most of the Carnival balls were closed to anyone outside of the city's society circles. To appeal to the many tourists who came to the city he created a brand new Krewe. He even held two Bacchus Carnival balls, one in 1949, the other in 1950. Upon the death of Brennan Sr., his son Owen "Pip" Brennan Jr. (born 1934), took over the Krewe in 1968 and worked with his uncle who was only three years his senior, restaurateur Richard Brennan Sr., to restore life to the New Orleans Carnival. On February 16, 1969, the Krewe of Bacchus staged its first Mardi Gras parade.

== History ==
Brennan's was founded in 1946 by Owen Brennan, an Irish-American restaurateur and New Orleans native. It was originally called the Vieux Carré restaurant and was located on Bourbon Street across from the Old Absinthe House. Bananas Foster was created at this location.

In 1956, Brennan's moved to its current location. This building, a two-story French Quarter mansion at 417 Royal Street constructed in 1795, was built for Don José Faurie and later housed the Banque de la Louisiane, the first bank in Louisiana. From 1841 to 1891, the mansion had been owned by the Morphy family, with Paul Morphy, the celebrated chess player and unofficial world chess champion, living there until his death in 1884. In 1920 William Ratcliffe Irby gave the building to Tulane University and it was initially leased by Owen Brennan in 1954 to open the following year as Brennan's. The restaurant purchased the building in 1984.

Because Brennan's father owned a share of the restaurant, the restaurant was eventually inherited by Brennan's siblings as well as his children. In 1973, disagreement within the Brennan family over the expansion of the restaurant line led to a split into several different corporations, with the original New Orleans restaurant being wholly owned by Brennan's widow and children, and other restaurants in New Orleans, Houston, and Dallas, the Brennan Family Restaurants, being owned by Brennan's siblings and their children.

Although the section of Royal Street in the French Quarter was spared the flooding suffered by most of the city in the levee failures during Hurricane Katrina in 2005, Brennan's did suffer significant damage, largely due to the contents of second-story refrigerators melting and seeping onto lower floors. The restaurant's extensive wine cellar lost temperature control, ruining the entire wine collection.

Following an extensive renovation, Brennan's re-opened on June 8, 2006. Brennan's closed on June 28, 2013. The new owners of Brennan's, Terry White and Ralph Brennan (a cousin of the former owners) purchased the building and the business at auction(s) after the former owners ran into financial trouble. For more than a year, the historic building underwent an extensive renovation. The new Brennan's was unveiled in the fall of 2014.

== Cultural references ==
Brennan's was featured in a season two episode of Ghost Hunters in which the TAPS team investigated claims of paranormal activity. Rush Limbaugh once stated (in a New York Times interview with Maureen Dowd) that he would sometimes charter a jet and go somewhere for dinner, adding Brennan's was his "all-time favorite restaurant".

== See also ==
- List of Louisiana Creole restaurants
