= E. J. Lagasse =

American chef (born 2003)

E.J. Lagasse
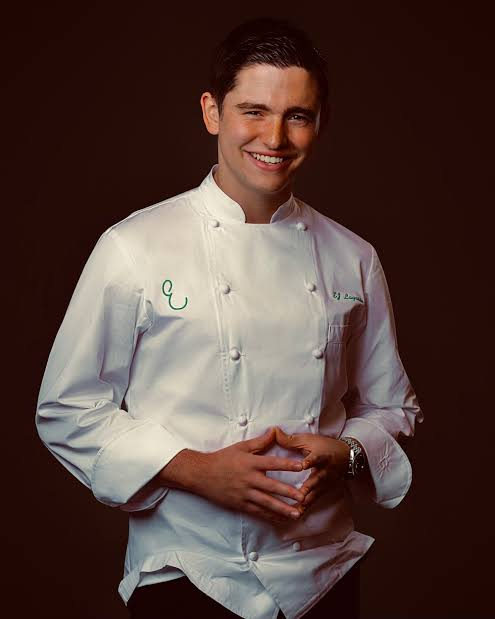
- Lagasse in 2025
- Born: Emeril John Lagasse IV; March 30, 2003 (age 23); New York City
- Education: Johnson & Wales University
- Known for: Youngest chef to win two Michelin Stars
- Culinary career
- Cooking style: French, American Creole
- Rating: Michelin stars
- Current restaurants: Emeril's in New Orleans, Louisiana; The Wine Bar at Emeril's (opened 2023)
- Website: https://emerilsrestaurant.com

Emeril John Lagasse IV (born March 30, 2003) is an American chef and restauranteur. He is the chef / co-owner of Emeril's in New Orleans, Louisiana and the son of Emeril Lagasse.

In 2025, his restaurant was awarded Two Michelin Stars in the inaugural Michelin Guide American South. He is the youngest chef to ever achieve the accolade, at age 22.

== Education and Training ==
Lagasse attended Johnson and Wales University, in Providence, Rhode Island, the same alma mater as his father. He had previously worked at his father’s restaurant Emeril's Coastal, in Miramar Beach, Florida.

Lagasse worked at Le Bernardin in New York City as a teenager.

After Culinary school, he moved to Europe to continue his training. He worked under Clare Smyth and Björn Frantzén before returning home to his family restaurant.

He credits Eric Ripert as his mentor.

== Career ==
Lagasse returned to his family restaurant, Emeril's, in June 2022. The restaurant underwent a renovation to update and refine the space, reopening in October 2023, with Lagasse being named Chef / Co-Owner. The format and physical change of the restaurant led to the opening of its sister restaurant, The Wine Bar at Emeril's, next door. He was awarded the La Liste, "New Talent of the Year" Award later that year.

He is known for his "Contemporary Louisiana" cuisine, with the menu at Emeril's populated by his adaptations of classic creole/cajun dishes and recipes originally developed by his father for the restaurant in 1990.

In 2024, Emeril's became a member of Les Grandes Tables du Monde and Relais and Châteaux. Later in the year the restaurant was awarded Five Diamonds from The AAA Guide.

2025 is considered a landmark year for Lagasse and the restaurant. In March, Emeril's celebrated its 35th anniversary in New Orleans. In September, the restaurant was named "#30" in the inaugural World's 50 Best Restaurants list, North America. In October, the restaurant was awarded Three Stars from The New York Times food critic Tejal Rao and was also named to the newspapers, "50 best Restaurants in America" list.

Later that year Emeril's was awarded Two Michelin Stars in the inaugural Michelin Guide American South, making Lagasse the youngest chef in history to achieve that feat.

He was a Finalist in the, "Emerging Chef" category for the 2026 James Beard Foundation Awards.

== Awards and Accolades ==
- 2025 Michelin Young Chef Award
- 2025 Esquire magazine, "Rising Star of the Year"
- 2025 Three Stars from The New York Times
- 2025 "50 Best Restaurants in America" The New York Times
- 2026 James Beard Foundation Awards, "Emerging Chef", Finalist
- 2023 La Liste, "New Talent of the Year"
- AAA Five Diamonds
