= K-Paul's Louisiana Kitchen =

Restaurant information
- Established: 1979
- Closed: 2020
- Previous owner: Paul Prudhomme
- Food type: Cajun, Creole
- Location: 416 Chartres Street, New Orleans, Louisiana, 70130

K-Paul's Louisiana Kitchen was a Cajun and Creole restaurant in the French Quarter owned by Paul Prudhomme that closed in 2020. Prudhomme and his wife Kay Hinrichs Prudhomme opened the restaurant in 1979. The restaurant is “credited with helping put New Orleans on the culinary map” and popularizing Cajun cuisine. It has also been described as one of the world’s most influential restaurants.

== History ==
The restaurant was located in a building originally built in 1864. In 1996, it underwent extensive renovations.

When the restaurant opened, it had a 62-seat capacity. Eventually, capacity expanded to more than 200 seats with diners from around the world.

K-Paul’s has been described as “unpretentious from the outside but revolutionary on the inside.”
