= Emeril's =

Coordinates: 29.9447°N 90.0673°W

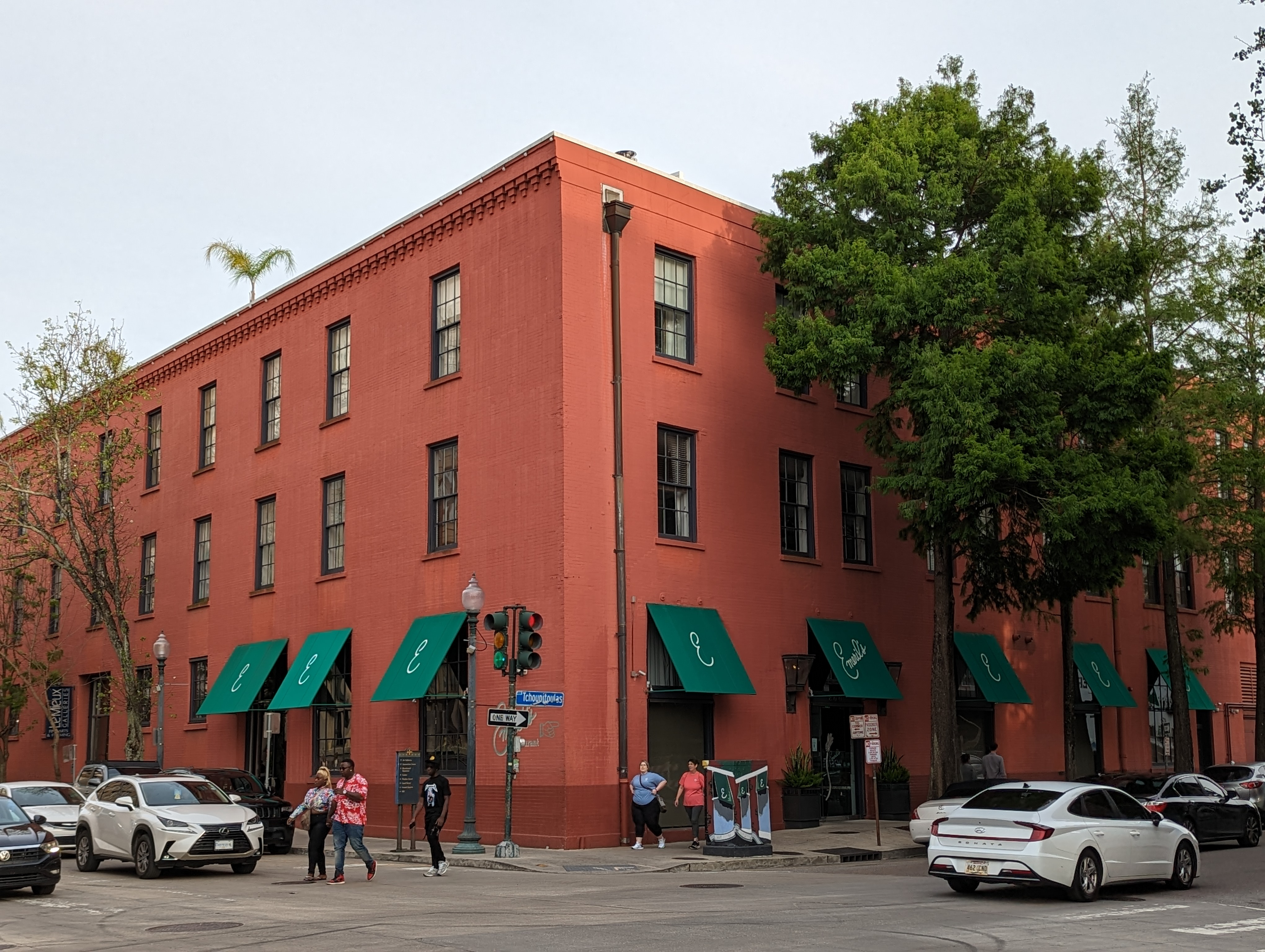
- Exterior of Emeril’s
- Interactive map of Emeril's

Restaurant information
- Owners: Emeril Lagasse, E.J. Lagasse
- Head chef: E.J. Lagasse
- Food type: American Creole
- Rating: (Michelin Guide)
- Location: 800 Tchoupitoulas St., New Orleans, Louisiana, 70130, United States
- Website: www.emerilsrestaurant.com

Emeril's is a Two-Michelin-starred restaurant in New Orleans, Louisiana, United States.

The restaurant was opened in March of 1990 by Chef Emeril Lagasse and is now helmed by Chef E.J. Lagasse, his son.

Notably, E.J. Lagasse is the youngest chef in history to be awarded two Michelin Stars.

== History ==
Emeril's opened in 1990 and was named "Restaurant of the Year" in Esquire that year. Emeril won the 1991 James Beard Award for "Best Chef South/Southeast". The Restaurant has held the Wine Spectator Grand Award since 1999.The cellar holds over 30,000 bottles of wine, including some of the rarest in the world.

In 2022, E.J. Lagasse became Chef / Co Owner and oversaw a renovation completed in October 2023.

The renovation included the creation and subsequent opening of The Wine Bar at Emeril's. Located next door with an a la carte menu and a separate kitchen, only sharing the wine list with Emeril's.

In November 2025, Emeril's became the only restaurant in the inaugural Michelin Guide American South to be awarded Two Michelin Stars.

== See also ==
- Emeril Lagasse
- E.J. Lagasse
- List of Michelin-starred restaurants in the American South
- List of restaurants in New Orleans
