= Solari's =

Defunct American grocery store

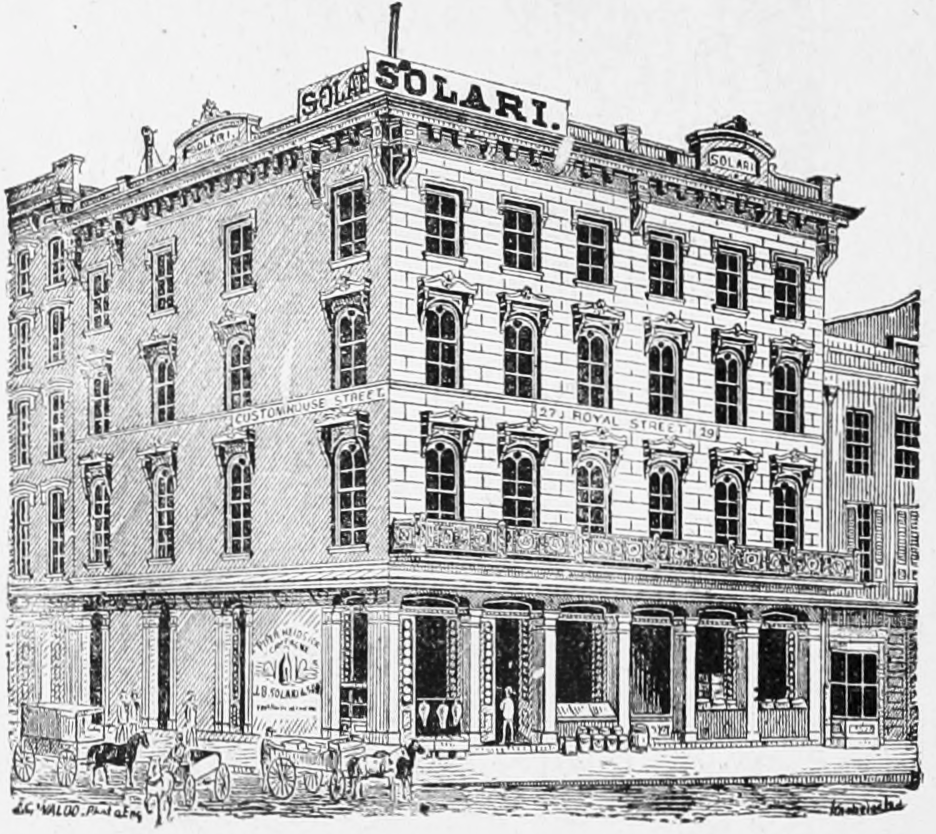
- Solari's Grocery Store as seen in 1879
- Type: Private
- Industry: Grocery
- Founded: 1863 or 1864
- Founders: Joseph B. Solari
- Defunct: 1965
- Fate: Liquidation
- Headquarters: New Orleans, Louisiana
- Areas served: New Orleans

Solari's was a specialty grocery store in New Orleans, Louisiana, that operated for approximately 100 years, closing in 1965. It was founded by Joseph B. Solari who immigrated to the United States from Italy in the late 1840s. The store featured fine imported foods.

== History ==
Joseph B. Solari emigrated from Genoa, Italy, to Iberville Parish, Louisiana, in the late 1840s. Shortly thereafter, he moved to New Orleans. Like many Italian immigrants in New Orleans at the time, he entered the foodservice industry. Solari opened a grocery store in the French Quarter of New Orleans in the middle of the American Civil War (Note: The year of founding was either 1863 or 1864, accounts varying.), generally an inopportune time to establish a new business in that locale. Solari's was opened on Royal Street at the intersection with St. Louis Street. The firm was initially known as J.B. Solari & Sons.

From its beginning, Solari's specialized in fine imported foods. Solari brought two of his sons into the business soon after its founding. The two sons were complementary, Angelo Solari emphasizing business management and customer relations while Joseph Solari, Jr., traveled to find sources of suitable imported foods. Later, the two sons ran this business as the founder Joseph B. Solari became more involved in the local chapter of the Italian benevolent association.

During its century of operation, Solari's re-located a number of times and also opened satellite stores. In 1870, the store moved to 45 Royal Street. (Note: The address became 229 Royal Street following re-numbering of French Quarter addresses.) At the time, the store was known as the A. M. and J. Solari Grocery Company. The store briefly moved to 4 St. Charles Avenue before returning to Royal Street at the intersection of Iberville Street. The owners opened a second location at 75 Camp Street.

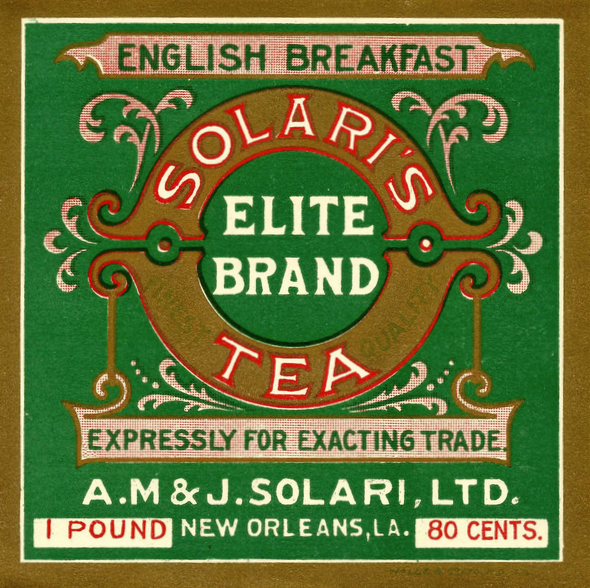
Solairi's Elite Brand English Breakfast Tea label

Solari's opened a wholesale business in the 1880s at 22 Magazine Street in New Orleans. Following an 1884 fire that destroyed their primary store, the owners commissioned architect Thomas Sully to design and build a new four-story grocery store at their Royal Street location. Another innovation at the time was that Solari's instituted telephone communications between its locations and also telephone orders from customers. The store also had a satellite location within the Maison Blanche Department Store on Canal Street in New Orleans.

For much of its history, Solari's maintained a deli counter in its store to provide breakfast and lunch for people living or working nearby.

Solari's used the tagline “Everybody Shops at Solari’s” which appeared in many of its advertisements.

Solari's went through a change in ownership in 1902 while maintaining its commitment to fine imported foods. (Note: One source states that some members of the Solari family remained involved with the store until the 1920s.) The new owners continued to expand with satellite locations and re-locations within the French Quarter.

Writing for Gourmet Magazine in May 1950, food critic Clementine Paddleford stated that Solari's was one of the finest grocery stores in the United States.

By the 1960s, Solari's business had declined significantly with fewer people residing the New Orleans French Quarter as it became dominated by tourism. At the same time, supermarkets in other parts of New Orleans became more important in the city. Solari's went out of business in 1965 after a century of operation. As of 2024, the site of Solari's was occupied by Mr. B's Bistro.
