= Richard Brennan (restaurateur) =

American restaurateur (1931–2015)

- Born: Richard Joseph Brennan; November 30, 1931; Irish Channel, New Orleans, Louisiana, U.S.
- Died: March 14, 2015 (aged 83); New Orleans, Louisiana, U.S.
- Education: Tulane University
- Occupation: Restaurateur

Richard Joseph Brennan Sr. (November 30, 1931 – March 14, 2015) was an American restaurateur in New Orleans, Louisiana, along with his siblings in the 1970s, transformed Commander's Palace “into the definitive modern Creole restaurant of its generation.”

The Brennan Family Restaurants owned many restaurants including Mr. B's Bistro and Dickie Brennan's Steakhouse.

Brennan and his nephew Pip were two founders of the Mardi Gras superkrewe Krewe of Bacchus.

== Biography ==
Brennan was born in the Irish Channel. He graduated from St. Aloysius High School, now called Brother Martin High School. He played basketball well enough to be recruited by Adolph Rupp at the University of Kentucky but he chose to attend Tulane University and Clifford Wells before attending law school for two years.

Brennan died on March 14, 2015 at his home in New Orleans, Louisiana, at the age of 83.
