= Old Absinthe House =

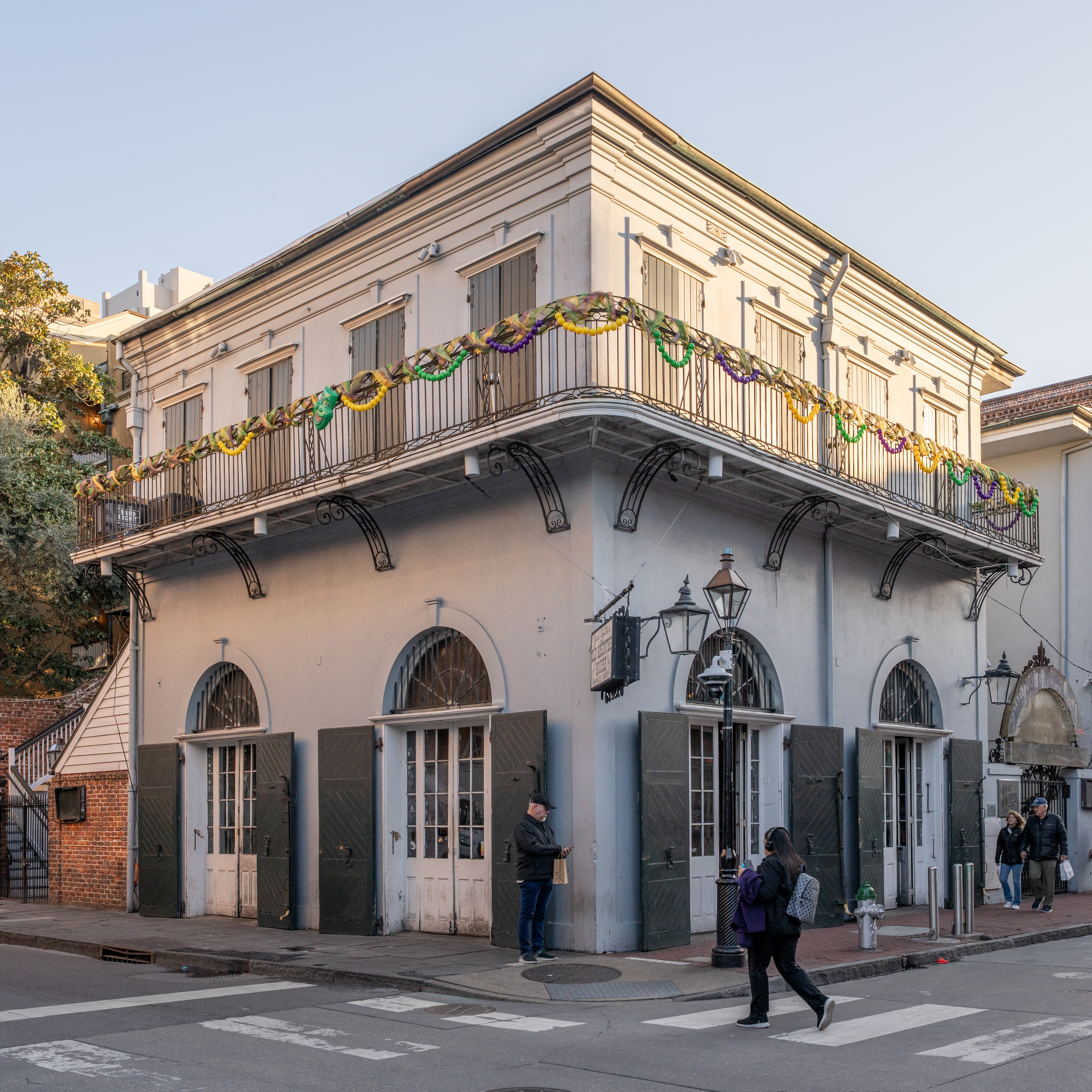
- Interactive map of Old Absinthe House

Restaurant information
- Established: 1806
- Location: 238 or 240 Bourbon St., New Orleans, Louisiana
- Coordinates: 29.955358°N 90.068434°W
- Website: Official website

The Old Absinthe House is a historic building on Bourbon Street in the French Quarter of New Orleans, Louisiana.

== History ==
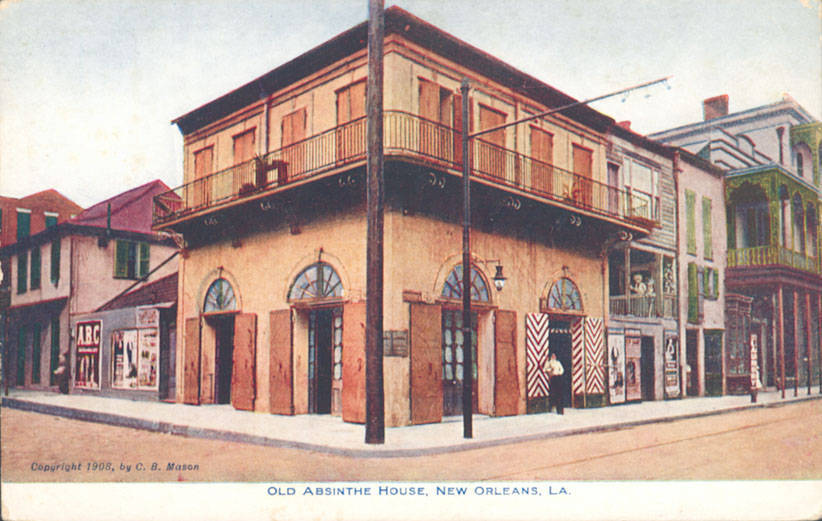
The building c. 1908

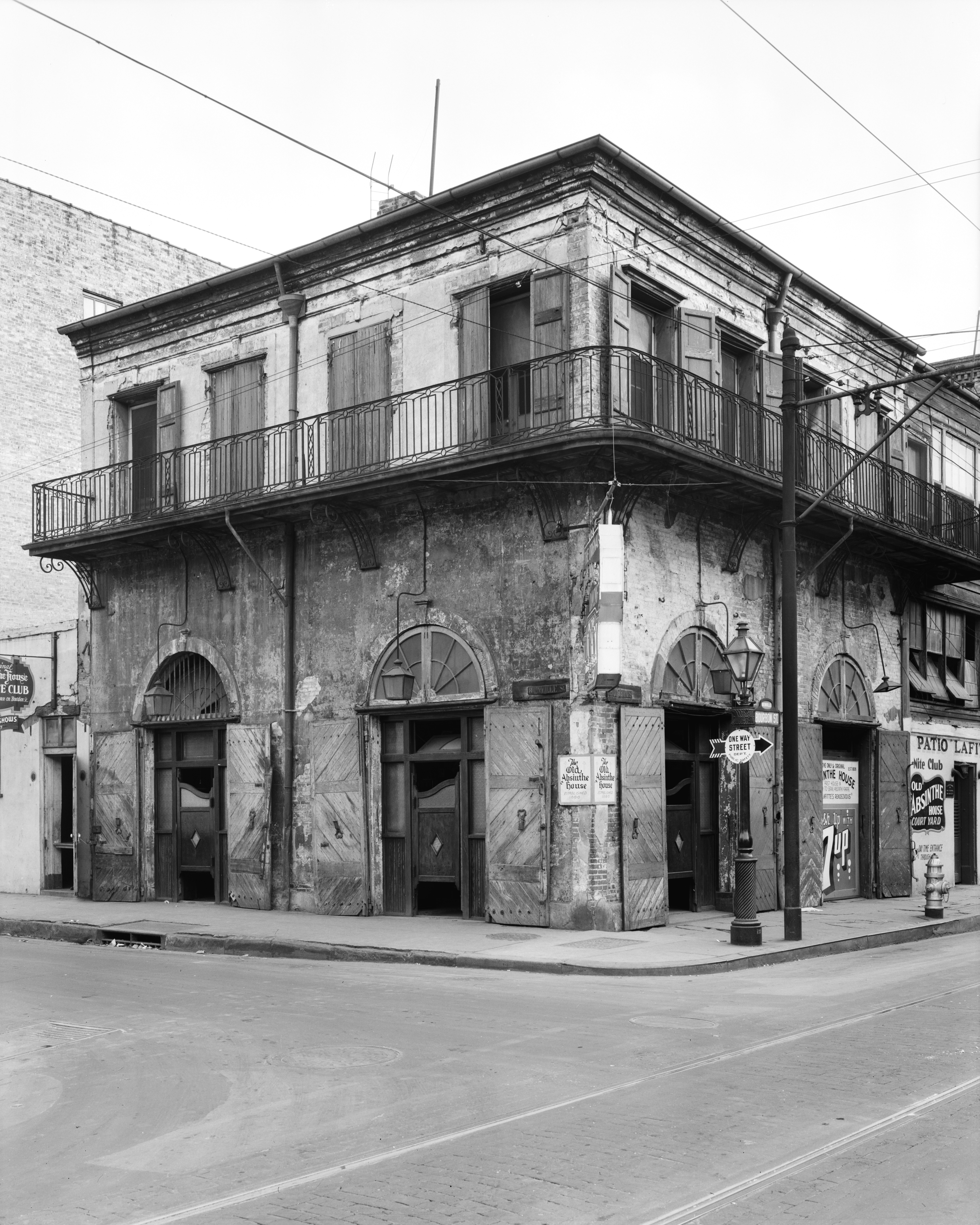
The building c. 1937

The building was originally constructed in 1798. It is one of the better-known structures in the Vieux Carre from the period. The building was completed in 1806, operating first as a grocery. The first floor was converted into a bar around 1836. (Note: The bar, in 1878, stated it was established in 1836, though accounts differ.) By 1842, the Aleix family began to manage the bar; the family were Catalonian immigrants, like the building's owners. Under their ownership, the bar gained a bohemian following, though it was not considered one of the leading bars in New Orleans. By 1869, it began being advertised under the name "the Absinthe House".

Around 1870, Aleix hired bartender Cayetano Ferrer, who was highly regarded for his work at the French Opera House. Ferrer took over management of the bar three years later, and helped it earn its reputation, by then titled as the Old Absinthe House or Old Absinthe Room. Ferrer's work, and that of his heirs, helped transform New Orleans from a working-class city into a tourist destination.

In the 1930s, following the end of Prohibition, bar-restaurants thrived in New Orleans. Many of these, including the Old Absinthe House, developed their own following in that decade.

Owen Brennan bought the bar in 1943.

== Architecture ==
The structure has two stories, and is used for commercial and residential purposes. It has an entresol: an intermediate service floor. The building has a wrought-iron balcony railing and a nearly flat roof, originally tiled.
