= Emeril Live =

Food Network program

- Genre: Cooking
- Created by: Emeril Lagasse
- Presented by: Emeril Lagasse
- Country of origin: United States
- Original language: English
- No. of seasons: 14
- No. of episodes: 1,653

Production
- Producer: Joe Langhan
- Running time: 60 minutes

Original release
- Network: Food Network (1997–2007); Fine Living (2008–2010); Cooking Channel (2010)
- Release: October 6, 1997 – December 14, 2010

Related
- Essence of Emeril

Emeril Live is an American television cooking program that aired first on Food Network from October 6, 1997 to December 11, 2007, and then on Fine Living Network and its successor Cooking Channel from July 7, 2008 to December 14, 2010.

On November 27, 2007, Food Network announced that it would cease production of "Emeril Live" on December 11, 2007. The show's final episode aired on that date. On May 20, 2008, the Fine Living Network announced that it would start airing Emeril Live, including never-before-seen episodes, beginning July 7, 2008. Emeril Live ended on December 14, 2010.
