= Brennan Family Restaurants =

American restaurant group

The Brennan Family Restaurants are a group of restaurants owned or operated by family members of the late Owen Brennan of New Orleans, Louisiana.

In the 1970s, there was a Brennan's Restaurant in Atlanta, Georgia.

Notable locations include:

- Brennan's – reopened in 2014
- Commander's Palace
- Dickie Brennan's Steakhouse
- Dickie Brennan's Tableau – see Le Petit Theatre du Vieux Carre
- Mr. B's Bistro

== In popular culture ==
In 1993, John Grisham's book-to-movie, "The Firm", featured Owen Brennan in a business lunch meeting between Tom Cruise and Gene Hackman in cocktail area of the restaurant. Owen Brennan's commemorated the filming by placing plaques on the two cocktail chairs where Tom Cruise and Gene Hackman sat.
