= Essence of Emeril =

Food Network program hosted by celebrity chef Emeril Lagasse

- Genre: Cooking show
- Presented by: Emeril Lagasse
- Country of origin: United States
- Original language: English

Production
- Running time: 30 minutes

Original release
- Network: Food Network
- Release: 16 November 1994 – 2007

Essence of Emeril is a cooking show hosted by celebrity chef Emeril Lagasse that aired on Food Network from 1994 until 2007. It was half-hour show which aired on weekends.

In each episode, Emeril shared with his viewers some of his 'kicked-up' recipes, similar to those on Emeril Live, but with a far calmer demeanor and quieter tone, and usually without the trademark apron that had become his Emeril Live uniform beginning with the 2000 season. In addition, unlike Emeril Live, there was no studio audience.

On some of the episodes, some of Emeril's friends/workers appeared. An example was when he invited three of his workers from his Homebase in Louisiana to cook up some healthy recipes.

His Essence of Emeril featured a wine cabinet, a built-in deep fryer, and other appliances. When he cooked with a specific ingredient he explains what it was and how it was made.
