= World War II Lost Films =

Documentary film

World War II Lost Films is a documentary assembled from archive footage from the World War II period.

== See also ==
- WWII in HD: Lost Films is the first documentary to show World War II as it really was, in original, immersive colour.
