= Mr. B's Bistro =

Mr. B’s Bistro
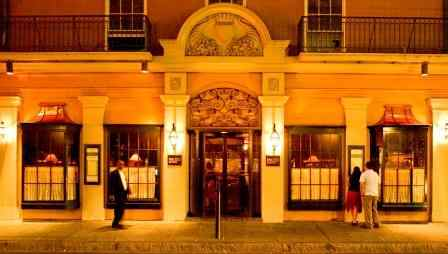
- Interactive map of Mr. B’s Bistro

Restaurant information
- Established: 1979
- Owner: Cindy Brennan
- Head chef: Executive Chef Michelle McRaney
- Food type: Creole
- Location: 201 Royal Street, New Orleans, Louisiana, 70130, United States
- Coordinates: 29.95429°N 90.06826°W
- Website: https://www.mrbsbistro.com

Mr. B's Bistro is a restaurant in New Orleans, Louisiana, United States. Located in New Orleans' French Quarter, the restaurant is run by restaurateur Cindy Brennan.

== History ==
Mr. B's Bistro opened in 1979 and at its current location in the French Quarter on the corner of Royal and Iberville Streets on the former site of Solari's Market. Paul Prudhomme helped to open the restaurant while employed by the Brennan family at Commander's Palace. Mr. B's Bistro is managed by partner Cindy Brennan.

The executive chef of Mr. B's Bistro is Michelle McRaney. Chef McRaney was preceded by chefs Gerard Maras and Jimmy Smith.

Hurricane Katrina severely damaged the restaurant in 2005, causing it to close. In 2007, Mr. B's Bistro was rebuilt to look the same as before the hurricane hit, and reopened.

Cindy Brennan authored The Mr. B's Bistro Cookbook: Simply Legendary Recipes From New Orleans's Favorite French Quarter Restaurant. The cookbook includes 112 recipes from the restaurant's menu.

Mr. B's Bistro has been included in USA Today's 10 Best Travel Guide for "Best New Orleans Spots for Top-of-the Catch Seafood", "Best Places to Savor Brunch New Orleans Style", and "Best Creole Restaurants in New Orleans from the Quarter to Uptown".

Mr. B's Bistro is located at the site of the Royal Street location of the defunct Solari's gourmet food store.

== Awards ==
In 2014, twelve Mr. B's Bistro employees were Restaurant Legends Award Winners.
