= Commander's Palace =

Restaurant in New Orleans, Louisiana

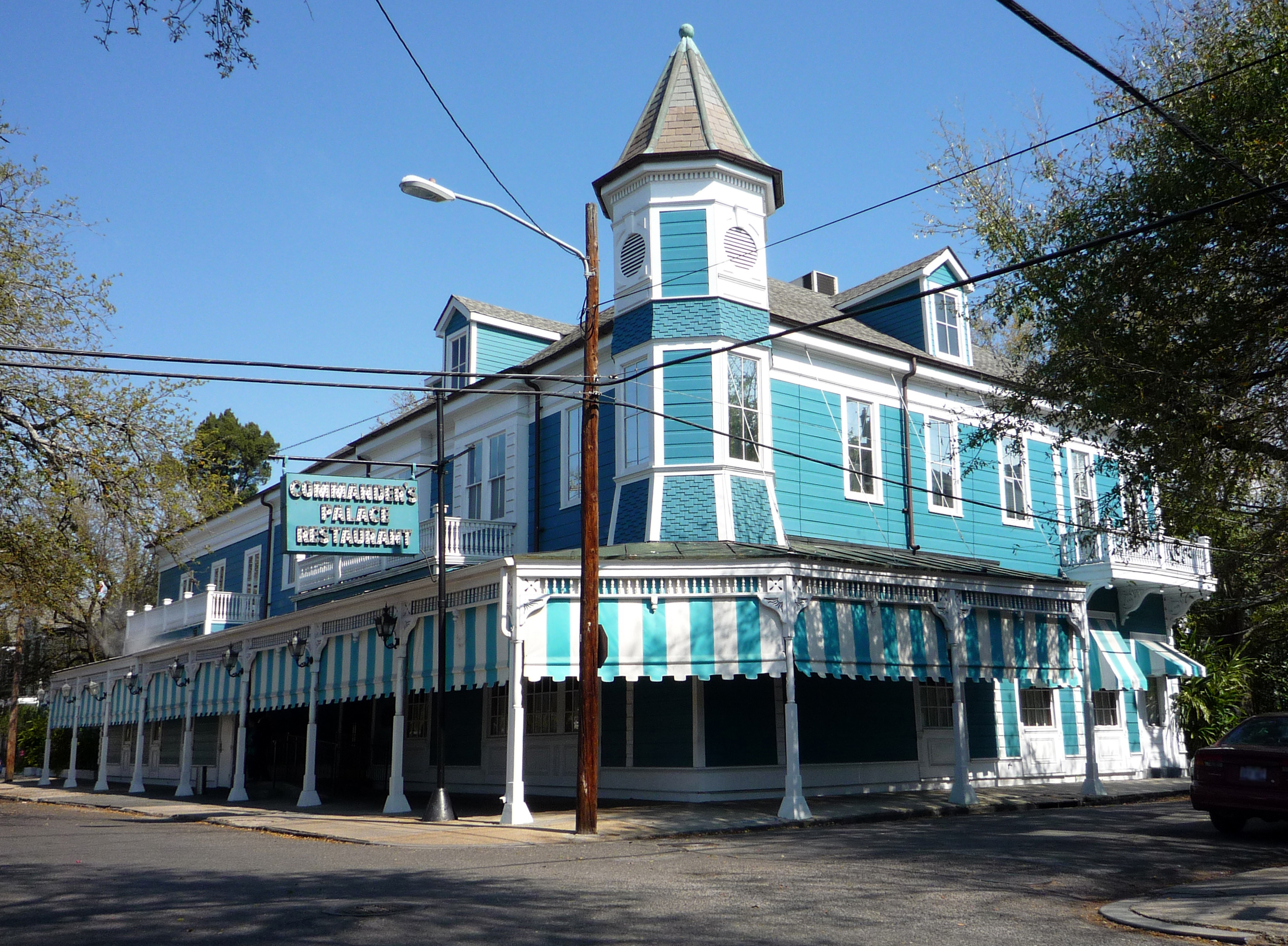
- Commander's Palace, renovated and reopened
- Interactive map of Commander's Palace

Restaurant information
- Established: 1893
- Owner: Brennan family
- Food type: Louisiana Creole
- Location: 1403 Washington Ave, New Orleans, Louisiana, 70130, United States
- Coordinates: 29.92878°N 90.08422°W
- Website: Official website

Commander's Palace is a Louisiana Creole restaurant in New Orleans, Louisiana.

== History ==
Emile Commander established a small saloon at the corner of Washington Avenue and Coliseum Street in the Garden District of Uptown New Orleans in 1893. Within a few years he turned it into a restaurant patronized by the distinguished neighborhood families of the Garden District. By 1900 Commander's Palace was attracting gourmets from all over the world.

In the 1920s, Frank G. Giarratano was the owner of the restaurant. He lived above the restaurant with his wife, Rose, and their two sons. There were rumors that there were private dining rooms upstairs rented to riverboat captains, visitors, etc. The upstairs rooms were the private residence of Mr. Giarratano and his family, while the downstairs, with a separate entrance, remained a family establishment. Fearing that the restaurant business would decline from what it had been during World War II, and Giarratano's declining health, in 1944 he sold Commander's Palace to Frank and Elinor Moran, who refurbished it and carried on with an expanded menu including many recipes still used. The Morans lived in the adjacent home facing Coliseum. Weather permitting, dining on the restaurant courtyard was encouraged—around a large Goldfish/Koi pond, with a large bank of electric heaters available to ward off the chill during the mild New Orleans winters.

In 1969, the famous Brennan restaurant family of New Orleans purchased the restaurant and began a redesign of the interior to complement the outdoor setting. Large windows replaced walls, and custom trellises and paintings were commissioned. Through the years, additional changes have included a redesign of the courtyard area, facility expansion into the back/side property, and the removal of much of the fence that had long separated the restaurant from the neighboring owner residence.

From 2001 to 2003, the restaurant hosted the Turner South series Off The Menu. Many of the segments were based on hunting and then turning the day's catch into a five-star dinner.

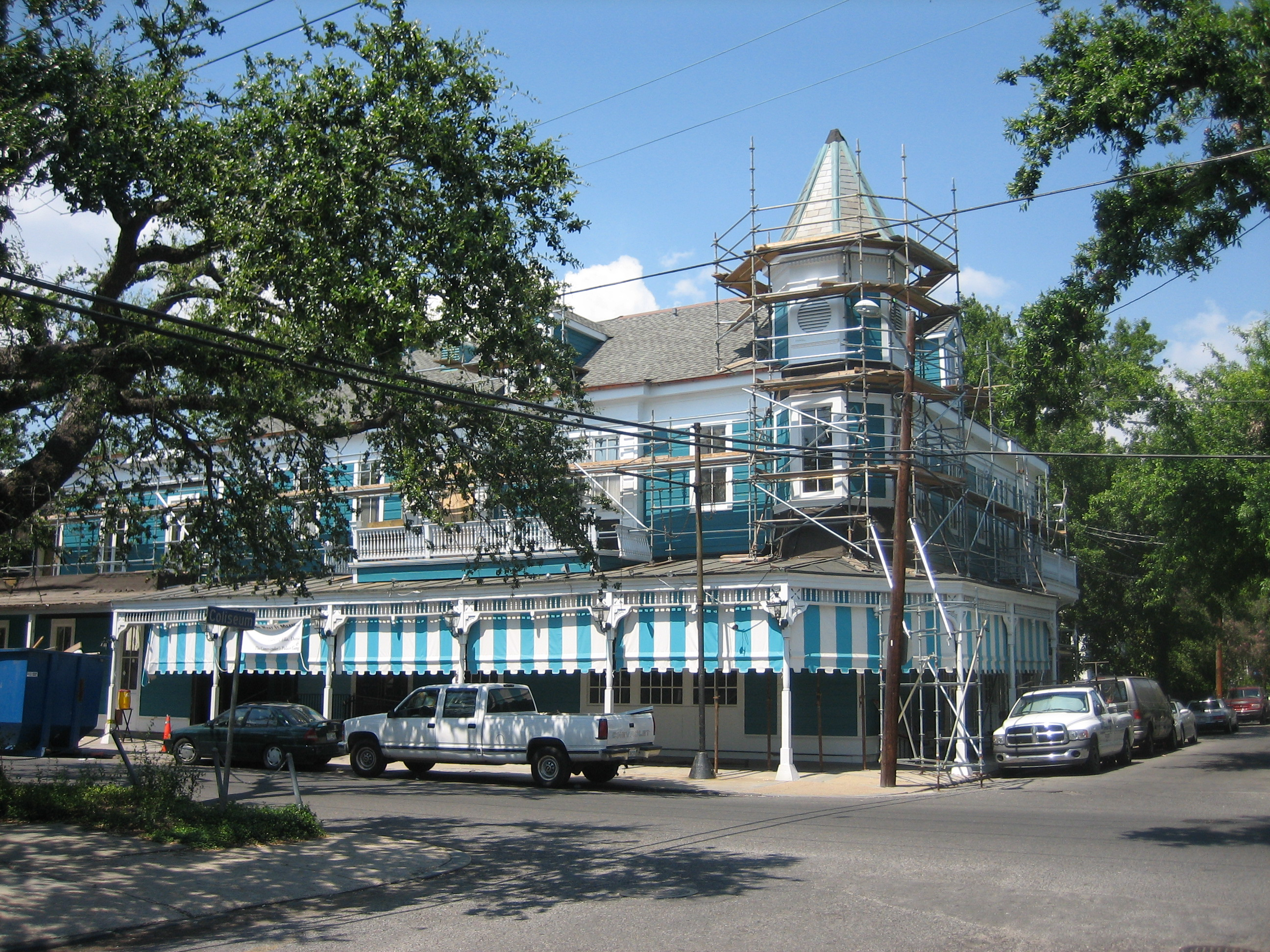
Commander's Palace undergoing post-Katrina repair work, May 2006

The restaurant suffered extensive damage due to Hurricane Katrina in 2005. After a full renovation, it re-opened on October 1, 2006.

== Awards and honors ==
In 2013, Executive Chef Tory McPhail won the James Beard Foundation Award for Best Chef: South. In 1996, the Foundation awarded the Most Outstanding Restaurant honor to the restaurant. Other James Beard Awards include Lifetime Achievement Award (Ella Brennan) 2009, Outstanding Service Award 1993, and Best Chef, Southeast Region (Jamie Shannon) 1999.

Since 2012, Commander's Palace has been a recipient of the Wine Spectator Grand Award. Zagat has listed Commander's Palace as the “Most Popular Restaurant in New Orleans” for 18 years. In 2008, the restaurant was inducted into the Culinary Institute of America Hall of Fame.

== See also ==
- List of the oldest restaurants in the United States
