= Chinese Tuxedo =

Defunct Chinese restaurant

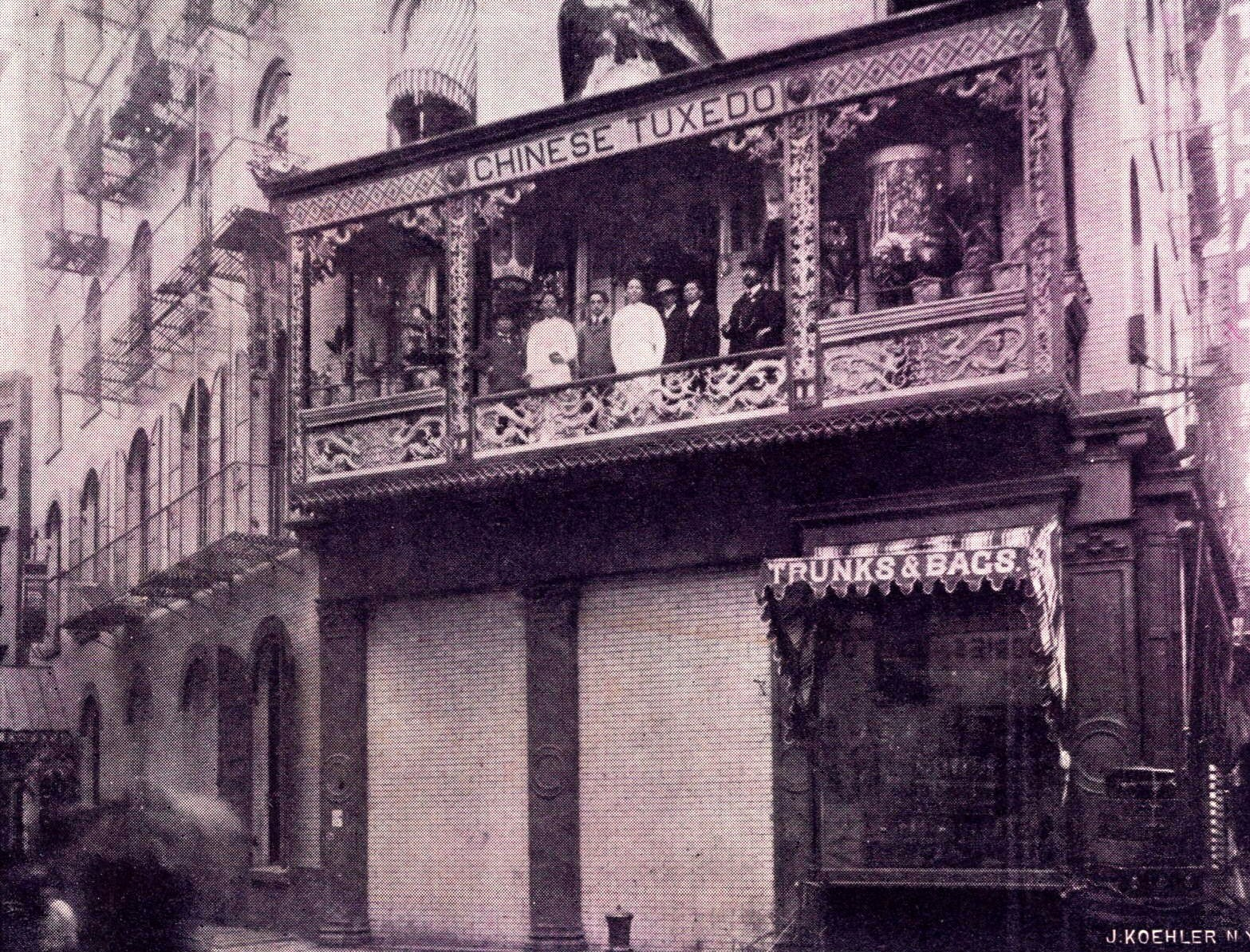
- The restaurant exterior from a 1906 postcard
- Interactive map of Chinese Tuxedo

Restaurant information
- Established: October 6, 1904
- Location: New York City, New York, United States
- Coordinates: 40.71418°N 73.99766°W

Chinese Tuxedo was a high-end Chinese-American restaurant located at 2 Doyers Street in Chinatown, Manhattan, New York City. Active during the early twentieth century, it became one of the best known upscale Chinese restaurants in Chinatown and was known for its ornate Chinese-style architecture, decorated dining rooms, and eagle-crowned balcony overlooking Doyers Street.

The restaurant was designed to attract non-Chinese visitors to Chinatown and featured elaborate chandeliers, decorative interiors, and theatrical Chinese-inspired architecture.

The name was revived in 2016 with the opening of the contemporary Chinese Tuxedo restaurant, also on Doyers Street. Reviewing the restaurant for The New York Times in 2017, Pete Wells noted the building's historical connection to a former Chinese theater on Doyers Street.
