= Outhier =

Outhier is a French surname. Notable people with the surname include:

- Louis Outhier, French chef
- Réginald Outhier (1694–1774), French priest and geodesist
