= Pêche Seafood Grill =

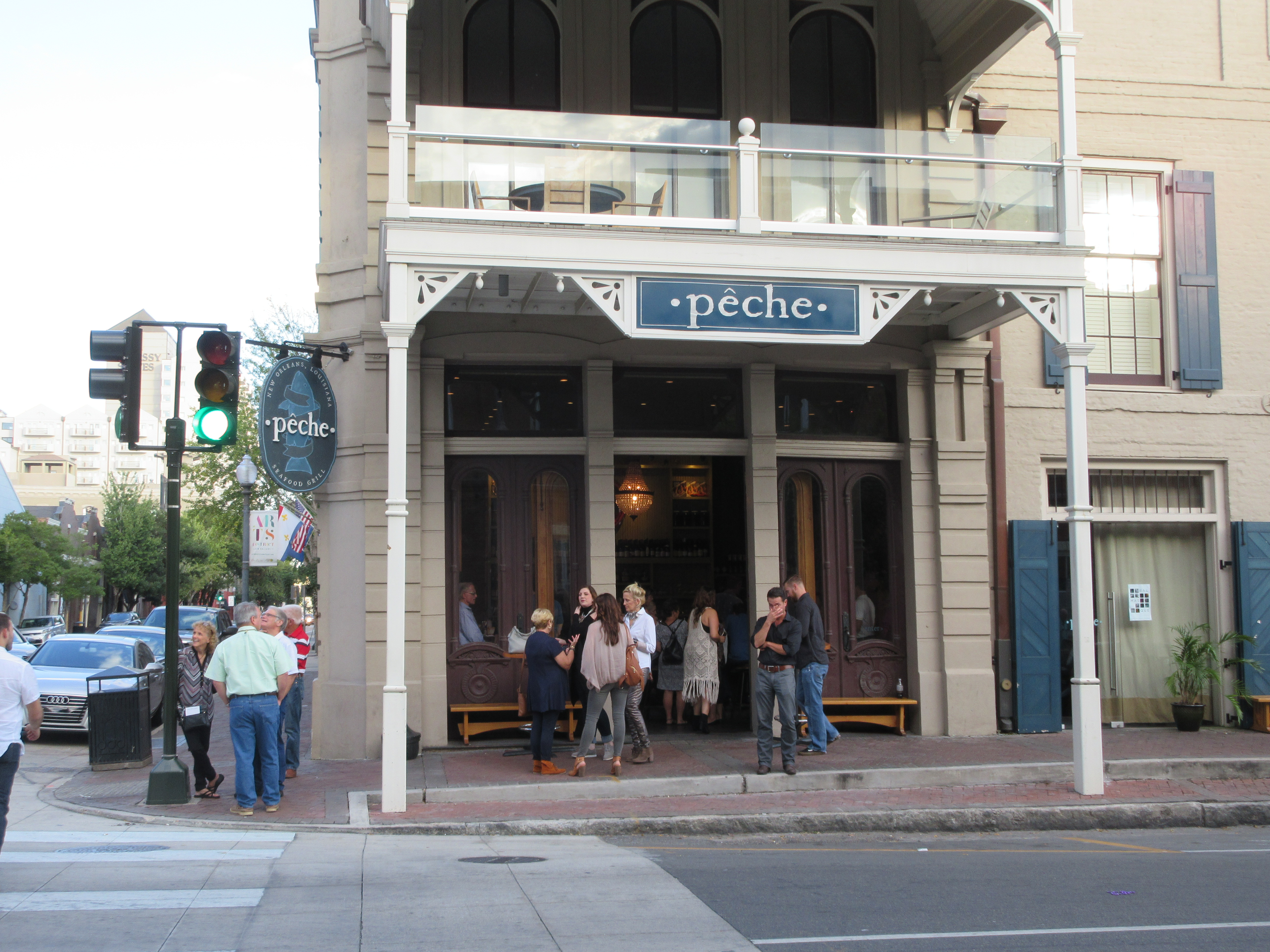
- Pêche Seafood Grill in 2016
- Interactive map of Pêche Seafood Grill

Restaurant information
- Location: 800 Magazine St, New Orleans, Louisiana, 70130, United States
- Coordinates: 29°56′43″N 90°04′09″W
- Website: www.pecherestaurant.com

Pêche Seafood Grill is a fish restaurant in New Orleans.

== History ==
It won the 2014 James Beard Foundation Award for Best New Restaurant and their chef Ryan Prewitt won Best Chef in the South. Prewitt is also a partner, along with fellow chefs Donald Link and Stephen Stryjewski.

== See also ==
- List of seafood restaurants
