= 425 South Financial Place =

Office skyscraper in Chicago, Illinois

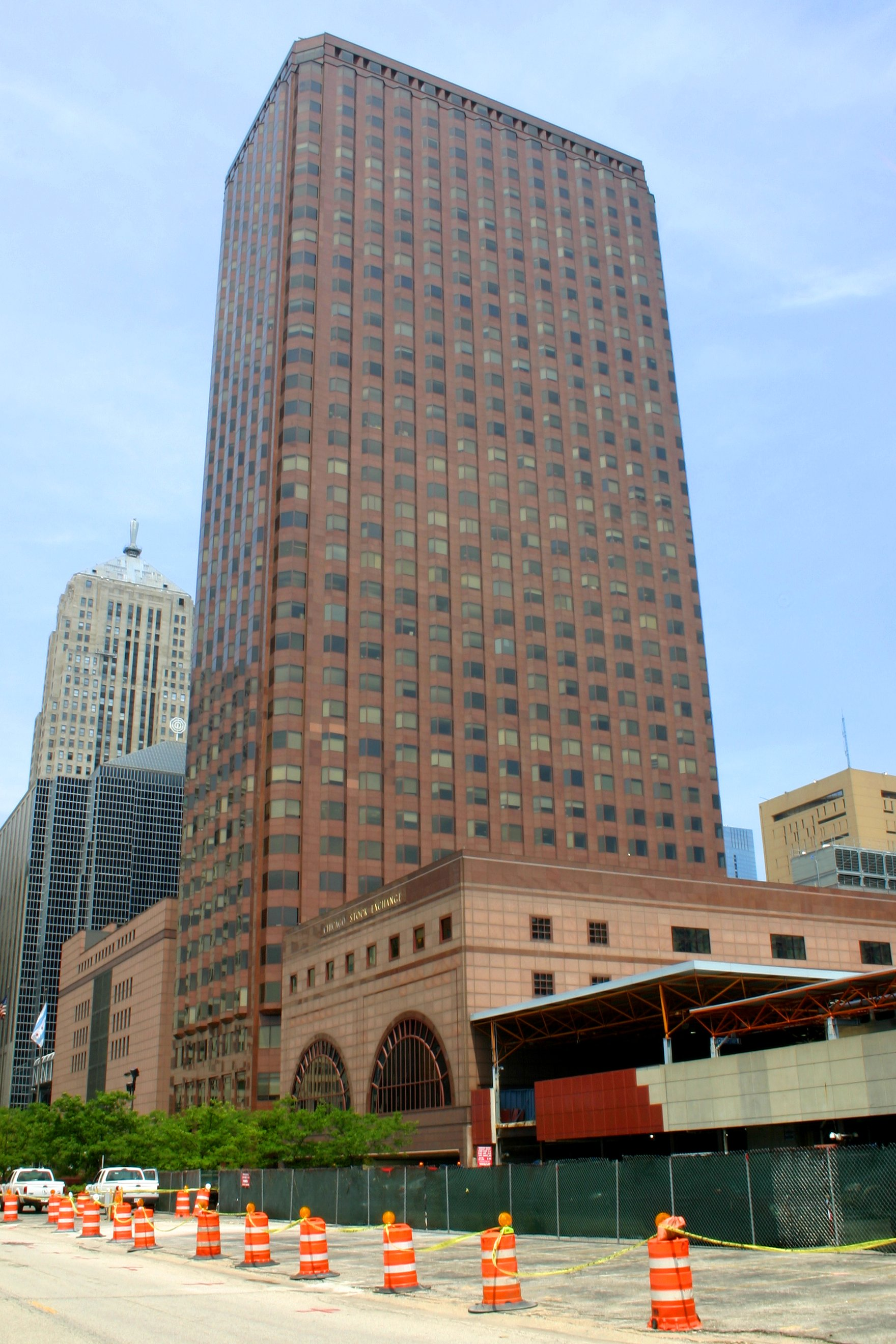
- 425 South Financial Place as seen from the southwest
- Interactive map of the 425 South Financial Place area

General information
- Type: Office
- Location: 425 South Financial Place, Chicago, Illinois
- Coordinates: 41.8760°N 87.6322°W
- Completed: 1985; 41 years ago
- Owner: CIM Group
- Management: CBRE Group

Height
- Roof: 515 ft (157 m)

Technical details
- Floor count: 40

Design and construction
- Architect: Skidmore, Owings & Merrill

425 South Financial Place (formerly known as FOUR40 prior to 2017, and as One Financial Place prior) is a 515 ft (157 m) tall skyscraper in Chicago, Illinois. It was completed in 1985 and has 40 floors. Skidmore, Owings & Merrill designed the building. It ranks 78th on the list of tallest buildings in Chicago.

In 2018, owner CIM Group completed renovations to the building.

425 South Financial Place houses the Chicago Stock Exchange. There is a boutique hotel on the top floor. 425 South Financial Place was the home of Michelin-starred restaurant Everest before it closed in 2020. LaSalle Street Station is attached to the building.
