= CIM Group =

Commercial property investment company

- Founded: 1994; 32 years ago
- Founder: Shaul Kuba; Avi Shemesh; Richard Ressler
- Headquarters: Los Angeles, California
- Number of employees: Over 900
- Website: www.cimgroup.com

CIM Group invests in commercial property on behalf of large institutions such as pensions. As of December 31, 2025, the company owned 304 assets comprising $32.0 billion worth of commercial property.

== History ==
The company was founded in 1994 by Shaul Kuba, Richard Ressler, and Avi Shemesh. Kuba and Shemesh are childhood friends that emigrated to the United States from Israel in the 1980s, where they set up a landscaping business. Ressler, a former investment banker at Drexel Burnham Lambert, became a landscaping customer and then joined them to invest in real estate.

In the early 2000s, the company developed much of the Third Street Promenade in downtown Santa Monica.

In 2004, the company acquired the site for Hollywood & Highland, which included the Tiffany Theater. It redeveloped the property and sold it in 2019 for $325 million; however, it did not sell the Dolby Theatre which is on the property, until sometime later; it was sold, in 2024, by the California Public Employees’ Retirement System (CalPERS) and acquired by Jebs Hollywood Entertainment for about $50 million.

In 2005, in partnership with JBG Smith, the company acquired the Marriott Wardman Park hotel from Thayer Lodging Group for $300 million.

In February 2007, the company acquired the BB&T Center for $117 million. In June 2017, it sold the property to Arden Group for $148.8 million.

In October 2008, the company acquired the Ordway Building, the tallest building in Oakland, California as part of a $412 million acquisition from Brandywine Realty Trust.

In 2008, the company completed the development of The 88, the tallest building in San Jose, California.

In 2010, the company acquired the site of the former Drake Hotel in Manhattan for $305 million and began construction of 432 Park Avenue on the site. It also acquired 15 William, its first investment in the Financial District, Manhattan.

In April 2012, the company acquired the site of 108 North State Street for $84 million from Bank of America, which had foreclosed upon the property.

In 2013, the company partnered with Kushner Companies to acquire 2 Rector Street. It sold the property in March 2016.

In November 2013, the company completed the development of the Downtown Grand in Las Vegas.

In 2013, in partnership with Ben Shaoul, the company acquired part of the Verizon Building for $247 million for residential conversion.

In February 2014, the company acquired Two California Plaza. It also acquired Monclair Place.

In July 2014, the company invested in Westlands Solar Park, a photovoltaic power station.

In August 2016, the company partnered with Kushner Companies to acquire the Jehovah's Witnesses’ Watchtower building in Brooklyn for $340 million in one of the largest transactions to date in Brooklyn.

In February 2017, Mitsui & Co. acquired 20% of CIM.

In March 2017, the company sold the then headquarters of the Charles Schwab Corporation to The Blackstone Group for $313 million.

In October 2017, the company acquired the Montague–Court Building, then the largest office tower in Brooklyn, for $171 million from SL Green Realty.

In October 2017, the company acquired Uber's building in Oakland, California for $175 million.

In February 2018, the company acquired Cole Capital, which had $7.6 billion in real estate assets, from VEREIT.

In 2018, the company completed renovations to 425 South Financial Place.

In April 2020, the company agreed to buy Baldwin Hills Crenshaw Plaza for more than $100 million with plans to convert the former Sears and Walmart into offices to drive more foot traffic into the remaining retail stores. However, in June 2020, the sale was cancelled due to community opposition to the plan without a residential component.

In May 2020, the company and partner Golub & Company received approval to develop Tribune East Tower, the second tallest building in Chicago.

In August 2020, the company acquired 5 towers in Alexandria, Virginia for $506 million in one of the largest apartment transactions ever in Northern Virginia.

In July 2024, CIM Group partnered with Michael Bickford to create Round Hill Capital Ventures, a business managing a $2.1 billion real estate portfolio concentrated mainly in European residential properties. In October 2025, Crow Holdings recapitalized a national retail portfolio of 194 properties totaling 4.5 million square feet across 30 states.
