= Baogel =

Bagel-cha siu bao bun

A baogel is a hybrid between a bagel and a pork-filled cha siu bao bun, created as a joint collaboration of Black Seed Bagel and Nom Wah Kuai in New York City in November 2017. As a hybrid of two foods, it has been compared to the cronut by several commentators.
