= Nom Wah Tea Parlor =

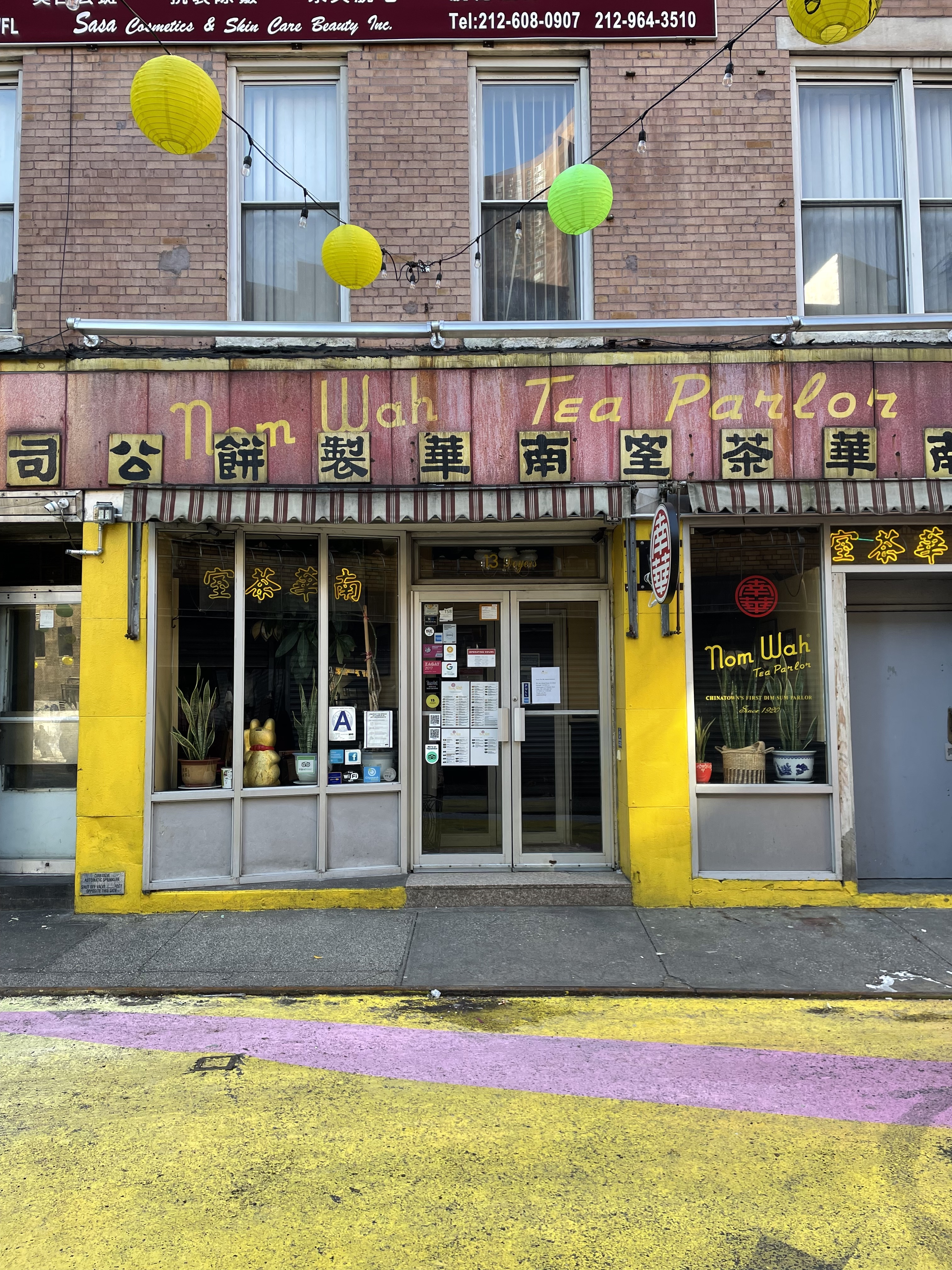
- Interactive map of Nom Wah Tea Parlor

Restaurant information
- Established: 1920
- Owner: Wilson Tang
- Food type: Dim sum
- Location: 13 Doyers St, New York, NY, 10013
- Coordinates: 40.71449°N 73.99819°W
- Website: https://nomwah.com/

Nom Wah Tea Parlor (Chinese: 南華茶室; Cantonese Yale: Nàahm Wàh Chàhsāt; lit. 'South China Tea House'), opened in 1920, is the oldest continuously running restaurant in the Chinatown of Manhattan in New York City. The restaurant serves Hong Kong style dim-sum and is currently located at 13 Doyers Street in Manhattan.

== History ==
The restaurant first opened in Manhattan, Chinatown at 15 Doyers Street and moved to 13 Doyers in 1968. The original owners of Nom Wah are unknown. Starting in the 1940s Nom Wah was operated by Ed and May Choy who primarily ran the business as a bakery. In 1950 the Choy's 16-year old nephew, Wally Tang, immigrated to New York and began working at the bakery. In 1976, Wally Tang purchased the restaurant. In 2010 the restaurant was purchased by Wilson Tang, a former investment banker and Wally Tang's nephew. Wilson Tang transitioned the restaurant from a traditional dim sum restaurant utilizing metal carts to a made-to-order style with a menu.

The restaurant was featured as a location of a scene in the 2014 film The Amazing Spider-Man 2.

In 2015 the Met Gala pre-party was held at the restaurant.

In 2017, the baogel, a hybrid between a bagel and a cha siu bao was created at Nom Wah Tea Parlor.

Nom Wah also has locations in Philadelphia, Shenzhen, China and Nolita.

In October 2020, Wilson Tang published The Nom Wah Cookbook: Recipes and Stories from 100 Years at New York City's Iconic Dim Sum Restaurant.

== See also ==
- List of Chinese restaurants
