= JoJo (restaurant) =

Restaurant in New York City, U.S.

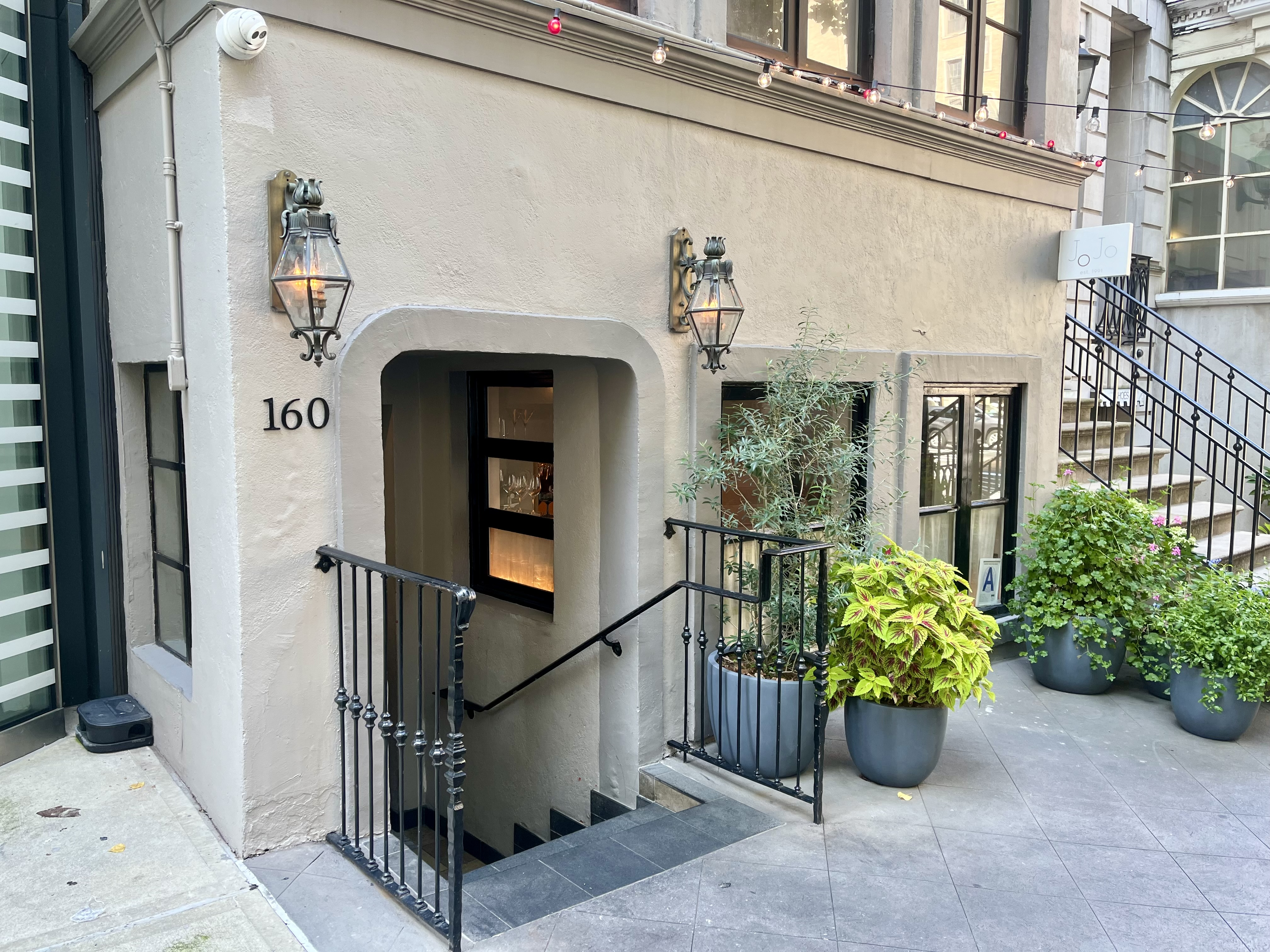
- The restaurant's exterior in 2024
- Interactive map of JoJo

Restaurant information
- Established: 1991
- Chef: Jean-Georges Vongerichten
- Location: 160 East 64th Street, New York City, New York, 10065, United States
- Coordinates: 40°45′55″N 73°57′56″W
- Website: jojorestaurantnyc.com

JoJo is a restaurant in New York City. Jean-Georges Vongerichten is the chef. It has received a Michelin star.

== See also ==
- List of Michelin-starred restaurants in New York City
