= Jean-Georges Vongerichten =

French-American chef (born 1957)

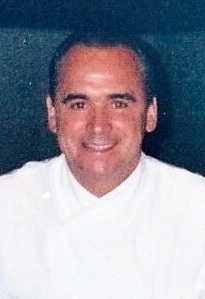
- Jean-Georges Vongerichten
- Born: March 16, 1957 (age 69); Illkirch-Graffenstaden, France
- Education: Culinary school in Perpignan, France
- Spouse: Marja Dominique Allen
- Culinary career
- Cooking style: Contemporary French cuisine, Thai-inspired French fusion cuisine, American nouvelle cuisine
- Current restaurants
- New York City: abc cocina, ABC Kitchen, abcV, Chez Margaux, Four Twenty Five, Jean-Georges, JoJo, Nougatine, Paris Café, Perry St, Terrace at Nougatine, The Fulton, The Mark, Tin Building by Jean-Georges, The Clam Bar at The Mark; Bridgehampton: Jean-Georges at Topping Rose House; Greenwich: Happy Monkey; Keswick: Marigold; Las Vegas: Prime Steakhouse, Jean-Georges Steakhouse; Miami Beach: Matador Room, Market at EDITION, Tropicale; Nashville: Drusie & Darr, The Pink Hermit; Philadelphia: Jean-Georges Philadelphia, Jean-Georges Sky High; Pound Ridge: The Inn At Pound Ridge; Paradise Island: Dune; São Paulo: Tangara Jean-Georges; Shanghai: Jean-Georges, Mercato; Guangzhou: Mercato; London: abc kitchens, Jean-Georges at The Connaught, The Connaught Grill; Paris: Market; Roquebrune-Cap-Martin: La Piscine; Saint Barthélemy: Sand Bar; Dublin: Jean-Georges at The Leinster; Tokyo: JG Tokyo; Kyoto: Jean-Georges at The Shinmonzen; Los Cabos: Seared, Suviche; Singapore: The Dempsey Cookhouse and Bar; Marrakesh: L'ITALIEN, L'ASIATIQUE; Doha: Curiosa by Jean-Georges; Bora Bora: Lagoon by Jean-Georges
- Previous restaurants
- Jean-Georges Beverly Hills; Mercer Kitchen; Simply Chicken; Pump Room; DUNE by Jean-Georges (Paradise Island; note: now listed as Dune); Café Martinique; Chi-Q (Shanghai); Vong (London, Mexico City); Vong Kitchen (Jakarta); J&G Grill (Mexico City); Jean-Georges Dining Room (Dubai); Jean-Georges Kitchen (Dubai); Market by Jean-Georges (Vancouver); Market by Jean-Georges (Doha; note: now Curiosa by Jean-Georges); On the Rocks (Saint Barthélemy)
- Website: www.jean-georges.com

Jean-Georges Vongerichten (German: [ʒãːˈʒɔrʒ fɔnɡəˈrɪçtn̩]; French: [ʒɑ̃ʒɔʁʒ vɔŋɡəʁiʃtɛn]; born March 16, 1957) is a French-American chef. Vongerichten owns restaurants in Miami Beach, Las Vegas, London, Paris, Shanghai, Philadelphia, and Tokyo, as well as New York's Jean-Georges restaurant and Tangará Jean Georges in São Paulo's Palácio Tangará, by Oetker Collection. He is head chef of Eden Rock, St Barths. Vongerichten is the author of five cookbooks, two with Mark Bittman.

== Early life and career ==
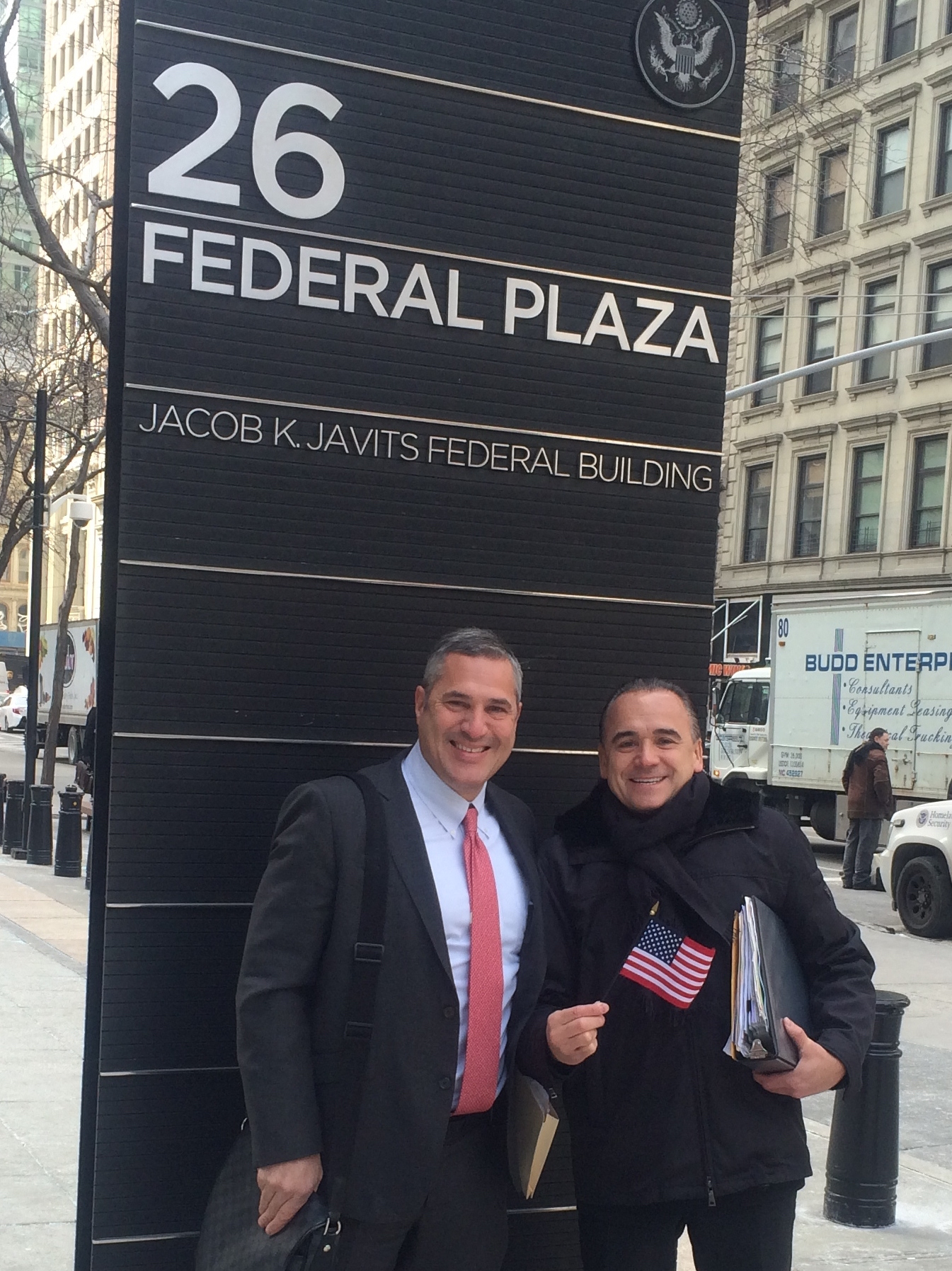
Michael Wildes and Jean-Georges Vongerichten, 2014

Born and raised on the outskirts of Strasbourg in Alsace, France, Vongerichten had a family life centered around the kitchen, where each day his mother and grandmother prepared lunch for the almost 50 employees of their business. His love of food cemented his choice of career at the age of 16, when his parents brought him to the three-star Michelin-rated Auberge de l'Ill for a birthday dinner.

Vongerichten began his training soon after in a work-study program at the Auberge de l'Ill as an apprentice to Chef Paul Haeberlin. He went on to work with France's top chefs, including Paul Bocuse and Louis Outhier at L'Oasis in the south of France.

Often working with Outhier, Vongerichten opened ten restaurants around the world from 1980 to 1985, including the Oriental Hotel in Bangkok, the Meridien Hotel in Singapore, and the Mandarin Hotel in Hong Kong.

== Relocation to the United States ==
Vongerichten arrived in the United States in 1985 under the auspices of consulting chef Louis Outhier, opening the Le Marquis de Lafayette restaurant in Boston. A year later he arrived in New York to take over as executive chef at Lafayette in the Drake Swissôtel, earning four stars from The New York Times at the age of 29. There he met financiers Bob Giraldi and Phil Suarez. Vongerichten, Giraldi and Suarez opened a bistro, JoJo, in 1991. JoJo was named Best New Restaurant of the Year, and earned three stars from The New York Times.

== Lawsuit ==
In September 2008, Vongerichten agreed to settle a lawsuit for $2.2 million filed by staff who claimed tips from several of his restaurants had been redirected to managers.

== Influence ==
In 2005, New York magazine wrote that in the past two decades, no single chef has had more influence on the way New Yorkers dine out—or on the way other chefs cook and other restaurants look. "He invented America’s answer to nouvelle cuisine," says Mario Batali. "When I first came to New York, his book Simple Cuisine was the holy grail for young chefs, and JoJo was the hottest ticket in town."

Vongerichten claims to have invented molten chocolate cake in New York City in 1987, but the French chef and chocolatier Jacques Torres has disputed that, arguing that such a dish already existed in France.

== Personal life ==
Vongerichten resides with his wife, Marja, a Korean-American/African-American actress and model (née Marja Dominique Allen; born 1976). The couple has a daughter.

Vongerichten has three grandchildren. He spends weekends at a house in Waccabuc, New York

== Community activism ==
Vongerichten serves on the Food Council at City Harvest, and runs his own foundation called Food Dreams.

== Books ==
- Home Cooking with Jean-Georges (co-authored with Genevieve Ko) (November 2011), ISBN 978-0-307-71795-5
- Asian Flavorings of Jean-Georges (October 2007), ISBN 978-0-7679-1273-0
- Simple to Spectacular (co-authored with Mark Bittman) (October 2000), ISBN 978-0-7679-0360-8
- Jean-Georges: Cooking At Home with a Four-Star Chef (co-authored with Mark Bittman) (September 1998), ISBN 978-0-7679-0155-0
- Simple Cuisine: The Easy, New Approach to Four-Star Cooking (1991), ISBN 978-0-13-195059-7

== Television ==
Vongerichten and his wife Marja debuted the PBS television series Kimchi Chronicles in 2011, a culinary travelogue set in South Korea and New York City.
