= Everest (restaurant) =

Coordinates: 41.8760°N 87.6322°W

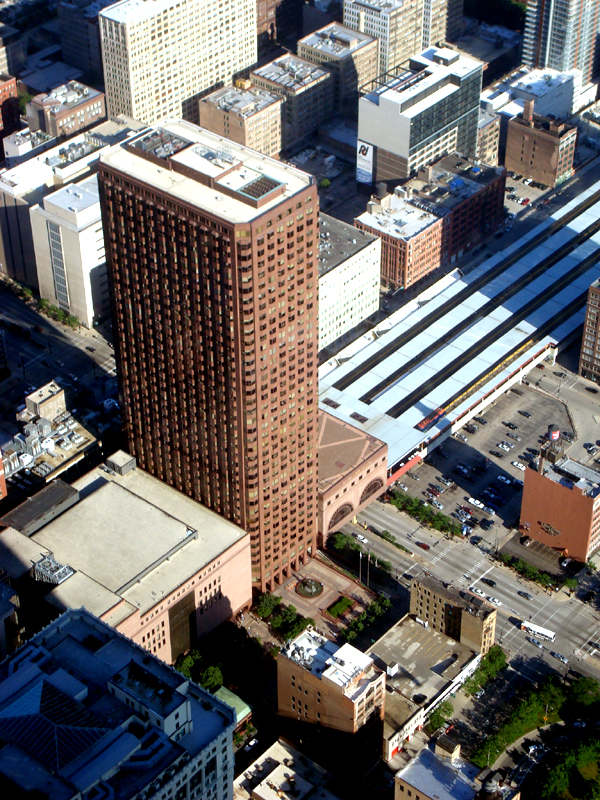
- Everest was located on the 40th floor of the Chicago Stock Exchange
- Interactive map of Everest

Restaurant information
- Established: 1986; 40 years ago
- Closed: December 31, 2020
- Head chef: Jean Joho
- Chef: Jean Joho
- Food type: French cuisine
- Rating: (Michelin Guide)
- Location: 425 South Financial Place, Chicago, Cook County, Illinois, 60605, United States
- Website: www.everestrestaurant.com

Everest was a French restaurant run by Jean Joho in Chicago for over 30 years. First opened in October 1986, it was located on the 40th floor of 425 South Financial Place, and served Alsatian cuisine. The restaurant had earned one Michelin star.

It closed at the end of 2020; the COVID-19 pandemic was a cause of its closing.

== Awards and accolades ==
- Michelin star, 2012-2020
- Rated 4 stars from Chicago Tribune, Chicago Sun-Times and Chicago Magazine
- Everest's wine list has been credited as the "country's best selection of Alsace wine" by USA Today, The New York Times and Saveur

== See also ==
- List of French restaurants
- List of Michelin-starred restaurants in Chicago
