= Lei (restaurant) =

Restaurant in New York City, U.S.

- Interactive map of Lei

Restaurant information
- Established: June 2025
- Location: 5-17 Doyers Street, New York, New York, United States
- Coordinates: 40.7146°N 73.9982°W
- Website: leiwine.nyc

Lei is a Chinese restaurant and wine bar located on Doyers Street in the Chinatown neighborhood of Manhattan in New York City. The restaurant opened in June 2025. It was named the Best New Restaurant by the James Beard Foundation Awards in 2026.

Lei is owned by Annie Shi.

== See also ==
- List of Chinese restaurants
