= Eden Rock, St Barths =

Luxury resort hotel in Saint Barthélemy

Coordinates: 17°54′11″N 62°50′10″W

Eden Rock, St Barths is a luxury resort in Saint Barthélemy in the Caribbean, jutting out on a craggy quartzite bluff overlooking the Baie de Saint Jean on the central north coast. The resort is very popular with the rich and famous. U.S. News Travel ranks it as the best hotel on the island, and was included in Travel and Leisure's 500 World's Best Hotels for 2015.

== Artist-in-residence ==
The resort is one of the few in the world to have an artist-in-residence. The resort's owner is also its artist-in-residence: Jane Spencer Matthews, who studied art in both South Africa and at London University's Slade School of Art. Jane established The Eden Rock Gallery in the 1990s. Following their purchase of the resort, Jane and her husband, co-owner David Matthews, extended the complex extensively, and also renovated the hotel's original 1950s décor.

== History ==
The resort was established in the 1950s by St Barth's politician Rémy de Haenen (d.2008). It was among the island's first luxury hotels and played a key role in establishing St. Barths as an international luxury travel destination. Rémy de Haenen then sold it to the Matthews family in 1995. It was reportedly frequented by Greta Garbo and Howard Hughes; Garbo once checked in for three days under the alias of Suzy Schmidt, but loved it so much that she stayed for three weeks.

In 2014, owners David and Jane Matthews partnered with Oetker Hotels for the management of Eden Rock.

The hotel was seriously damaged by Hurricane Irma in 2017. Following a two-year reconstruction, Eden Riock, St Barths reopened in 2019 with redesigned facilities including the Sand Bar, the Rémy Bar, and the Eden Spa.

In 2020, two new signature suites, Pippa and Jane, together with the Vogue guestroom, were added to the property.

== Architecture ==
Rather than adhering to a formal architectural movement (such as Art Deco or Brutalist), Eden Rock is known for its Caribbean luxury architecture, blending the original 1950s character with contemporary design. Its defining feature is its dramatic setting on a natural rocky promontory extending into St. Jean Bay, making it one of the island's most recognisable landmarks.

== Facilities ==
Eden Rock contains 32 rooms and suites and 2 villas. The original rooms are described as being "stuffed with antiques, family heirlooms, silver fixtures, steamer trunks, four-poster beds and watercolours of local scenes". The beach houses contain one to three bedrooms. The Howard Hughes Suite is above the main building on the rock, and features hardwood floors, three verandahs offering 360-degree panoramas, and two bathrooms uniquely clad in welded copper. The Rockstar Suite opened in 2010, described as being a "1,486 square metres (16,000 sq ft) stunner with four master suites, a screening room, a fully-equipped recording studio, a pool table, a private pool, and a dedicated butler," costing $130,000 for a week's stay. The Villa Nina features two bedrooms, and its own pool and art gallery.

The resort is served by two restaurants, "The On The Rocks" and "The Sand Bar", headed by chef Jean-Georges Vongerichten.

== Accolades ==
Eden Roc, St Barths has received the following industry awards:

Condé Nast Traveller’s 2026 Triple Crown Award

Travel + Leisure World’s Best Awards 2026

5-star Forbes Travel Guide 2026

Fabrice MOIZAN (General Manager Eden Rock - St Barths) named Best Hôtelier at the DUCO Travel Summit Awards 2025
