= Tribune East Tower =

Mixed use supertall tower awaiting construction in Chicago

General information
- Status: Approved
- Type: Residential, Hotel
- Location: Chicago, Illinois, U.S., East Illinois Street & North Cityfront Plaza Drive
- Coordinates: 41°53′26″N 87°37′21″W

Height
- Architectural: 1,442 ft (440 m)
- Tip: 1,442 ft (440 m)

Technical details
- Floor count: 113
- Floor area: 1.3M sq ft

Design and construction
- Architect: Adrian Smith + Gordon Gill
- Developer: CIM Group; Golub & Company

Other information
- Number of units: 564
- Parking: 426

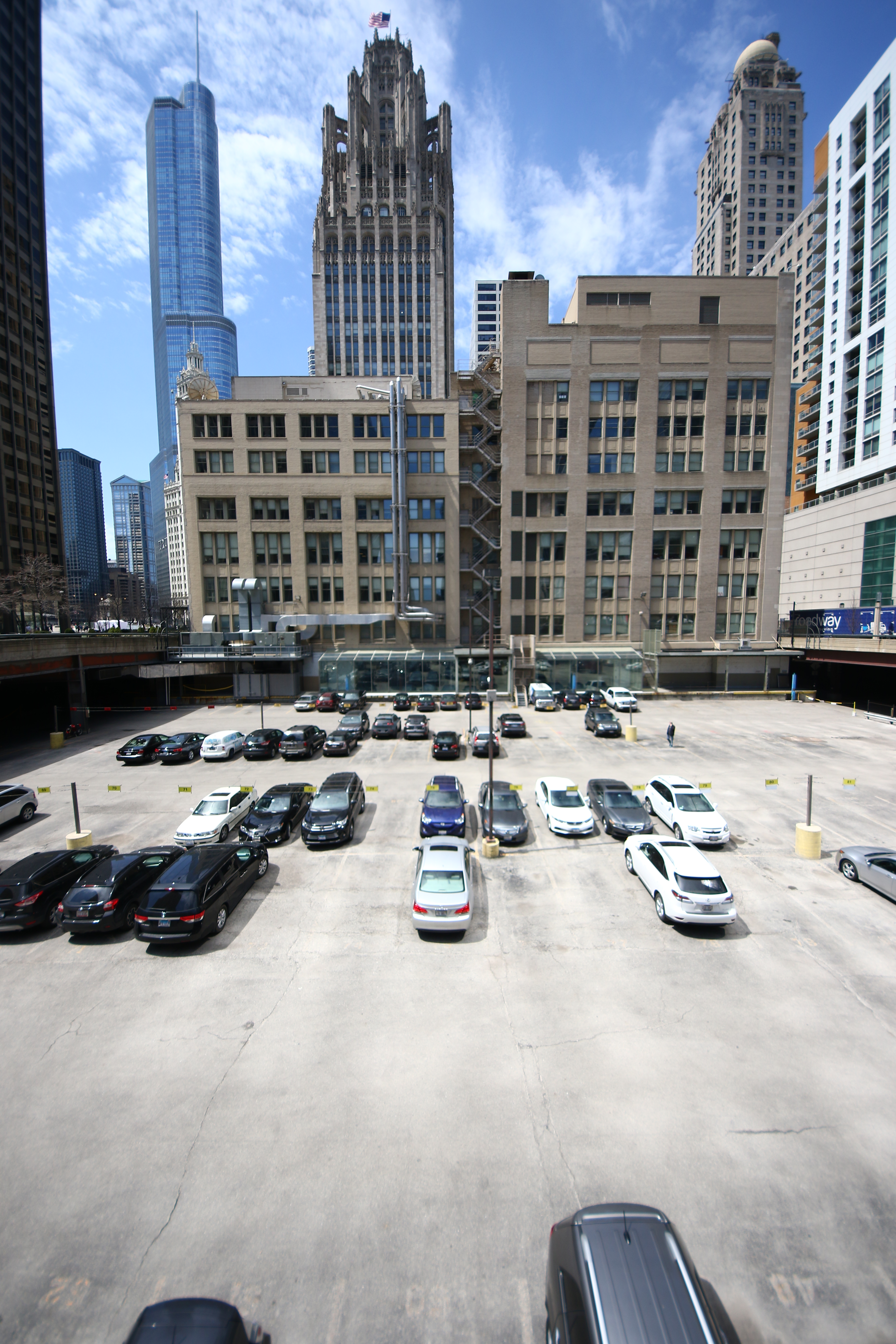
Tribune Tower property from the eastern edge. Background (left to right) Trump International Hotel and Tower, Tribune Tower, and Wrigley Building; midground (l to r) Chicago Tribune printing plant and WGN-TV building, foreground proposed new tower site.

Tribune East Tower is a 1,442 ft (439.5 m) mixed use supertall tower to be constructed on the eastern side of the Tribune Tower property, in the Streeterville area of Chicago. The building plans were approved on May 8, 2020. When completed, the tower will be the second-tallest building in Chicago, after the Willis Tower, and one of the tallest buildings in the Western Hemisphere. As of 2023, construction was expected to begin in the first half of 2024 and to be completed by September 2027. However, construction has not yet begun as of 2026.

== History ==
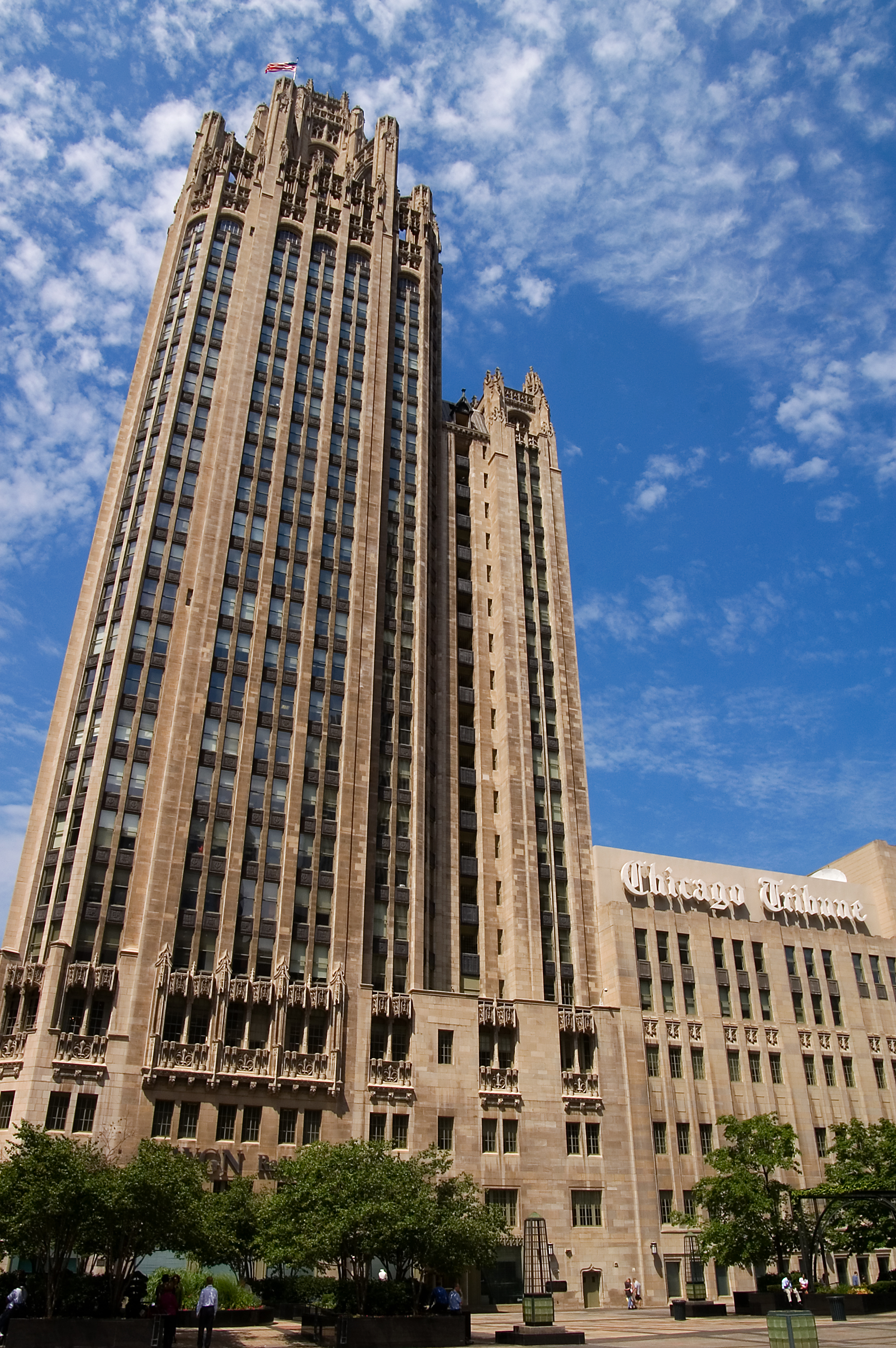
Tribune Tower and the adjacent Chicago Tribune printing plant (from the south)

Tribune Tower sits on the southwest corner of property that includes four buildings and a surface parking lot. The other buildings are (clockwise) the four-story 1935 WGN Radio building, the eleven-story 1950 WGN-TV building, and the old Chicago Tribune printing plant, with the parking lot immediately east of all of these buildings. The Tower itself was declared an official Chicago landmark by the city in 1989.

In early September 2016, prospective buyers of the Tribune Tower property had redevelopment plans for the adjacent Pioneer Court that were at odds with local interests to protect views of Tribune Tower. Nonetheless, later that month, Tribune Media sold Tribune Tower and adjacent property totaling 3 acres (12,141 m^{2}), including the 36,000 sq ft (3,345 m^{2}) surface parking lot, to the partnership. At the time of the purchase, the partnership of Los Angeles-based CIM Group and Chicago's Golub & Co. sought input on how to redevelop the properties, although 42nd District Alderman Brendan Reilly said that he would protect views of the Tower from the Michigan Avenue Bridge to the south and the Ogden Slip to the east.

By 2017, there were expectations that the partnership would plan a skyscraper tower to the east of Tribune Tower, though no plans had yet been made public. In January 2018, plans emerged for a skyscraper on the northern portion of the parking lot at the east side of the Tribune Tower property. Plans called for 220 hotel rooms and 158 condominium units; the tower would be slightly shorter than the Trump International Hotel and Tower. The new skyscraper was designed by Adrian Smith + Gordon Gill Architecture of Chicago. As an employee of Skidmore, Owings & Merrill, Adrian Smith had designed Trump Tower and the Burj Khalifa, which became the tallest building in the world in 2010.

Originally envisioned at 1,388 ft (423.1 m) and standing nearly three times as tall as the 36-story Tribune Tower, the Tribune East Tower faced opposition for obstructing views of the Tower, as well as "dwarfing" it from a historical perspective. Plans were officially announced for a 1,422 ft (433.4 m) tall 200-unit hotel, 439-apartment and 125-condominium building on April 16, 2018. The building will be 29 ft (8.8 m) shorter than the Willis Tower, the city's tallest. The proposal outlined several details, including funding earmarked for affordable housing and neighborhood opportunity as well as plans for the rest of the Tribune Tower property. At the time it was proposed, the building had no official name, but it was referred to as Tribune East by the media. In mid-October 2018, the Chicago Plan Commission approved the plans for the city's second tallest building. Chicago City Council approved the plans in an October 31 meeting. Minor revisions were unveiled on November 20, 2019, and on May 8, 2020, the project received final approval. Construction has not yet started. In 2023, the developer posted official plans on construction dates, with February 2024 beginning construction, with a conclusion in September 2027. The final plans, as of 2023, include 426 parking spaces, a 250-unit hotel, and 564-units, made up of 125 condos and 439 rentals, including 10% affordable units.

== See also ==
- List of tallest buildings in the United States
