= Brasserie Jo =

Defunct restaurant in Chicago, Illinois, U.S.

- Interactive map of Brasserie Jo

Restaurant information
- Established: September 1995
- Owner: Jean Joho
- Head chef: Jean Joho
- Location: 59 W Hubbard St, Chicago, Illinois, 60610, United States
- Coordinates: 41°53′24.13″N 87°37′47.55″W

Brasserie Jo was a Chicago restaurant that received a James Beard Foundation Award for Best New Restaurant in 1996. Jean Joho was the founding chef. It closed in 2010 after being open for 15 years. A pop-up, carry-out only option opened in 2020.

Joho opened a second branch of the restaurant in the South End of Boston in the Colonnade Hotel, in 1998. That location closed in October 2018. The menu focused on food from Alsace.

== See also ==
- List of defunct restaurants of the United States
- James Beard Foundation Award: 1990s
