= Marea (restaurant) =

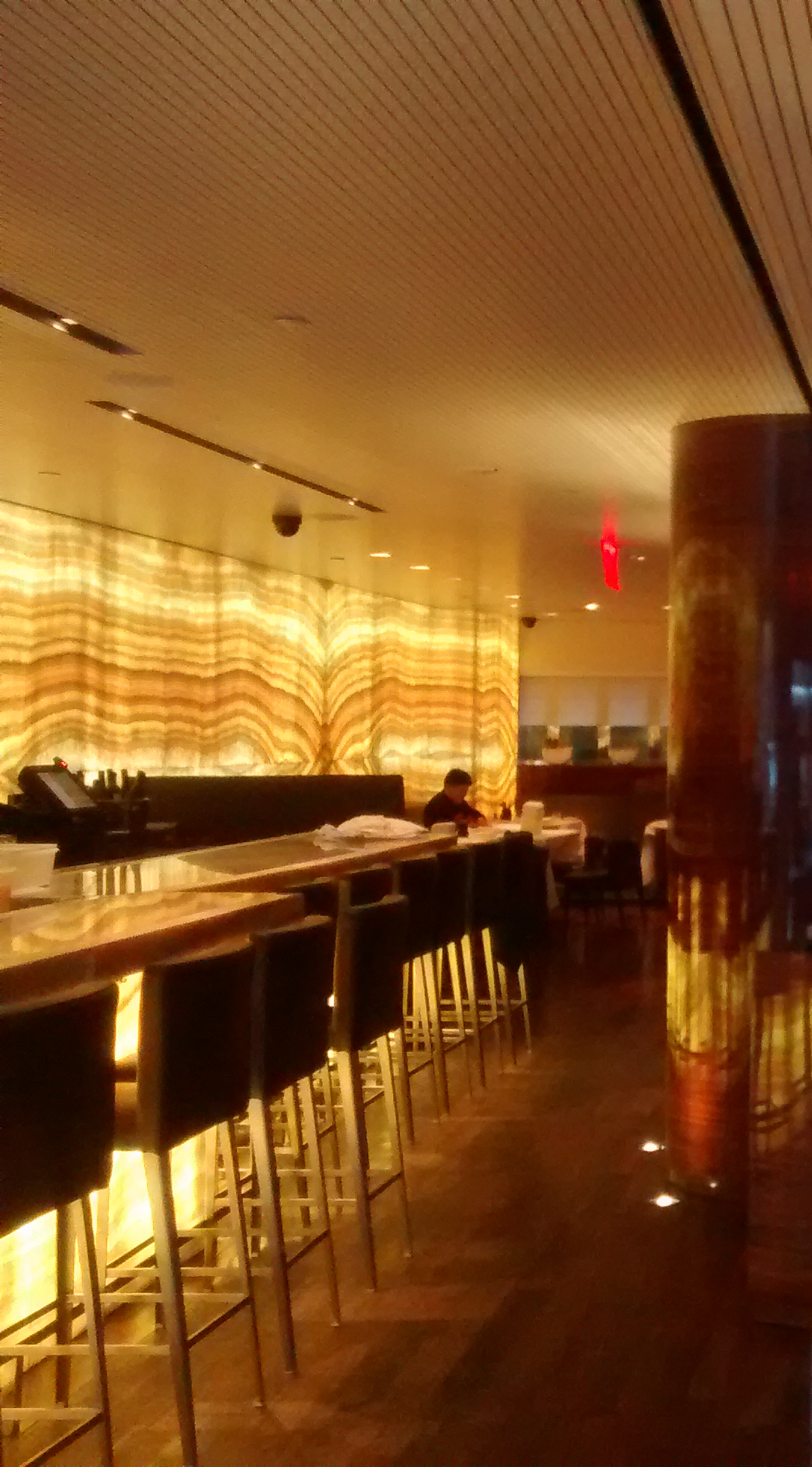
- Interactive map of Marea

Restaurant information
- Established: May 2009; 17 years ago
- Owner: Ahmass Fakahany
- Chef: Lauren DeSteno
- Food type: Italian cuisine, seafood
- Rating: AAA Five Diamond Award (2011–2023)
- Location: 240 Central Park South, Manhattan, New York City, New York, 10019, United States
- Coordinates: 40°46′03″N 73°58′51″W

Marea is an Italian and seafood restaurant at 240 Central Park South, on Columbus Circle in Manhattan, New York City, which opened in May 2009.

== Awards and reviews ==
It won the James Beard Award for best new restaurant in 2010. Most recently, in February 2023, The Infatuation named Marea one of the, "15 Most Exciting Dining Spots in NYC Right Now." Additional recent accolades include, "One of the City's Top Italian Spots," by Eater and Business Insider's Best Restaurants in America.

In 2012 Marea received two stars in the Michelin guide; in 2020 it was downgraded to a single star. The restaurant lost its final star in 2022. It was also featured on the show Top Chef: All Stars.

Since 2011, it has been the recipient of the AAA Five Star Award.

In 2013, Zagats gave it a food rating of 28 in its then thirty-point ranking, the top rating for any Italian restaurant in Manhattan.

In July 2013, Marea was the restaurant chosen for the Financial Times column "Lunch with the FT" with the guest being Ron Perelman.

In 2016, Anthony Bourdain named it as one of his favorite places to dine in New York City.

== See also ==
- List of Italian restaurants
- List of seafood restaurants
