= Shaya (restaurant) =

Restaurant in New Orleans, Louisiana, U.S.

- Interactive map of Shaya

Restaurant information
- Location: 4213 Magazine Street, New Orleans, Louisiana, 70115, United States
- Coordinates: 29°55′16″N 90°5′58.4″W

Shaya is a restaurant in New Orleans, in the U.S. state of Louisiana. The business received the James Beard Foundation Award for Best New Restaurant.
