= ABC Kitchen =

Restaurant in New York City, U.S.

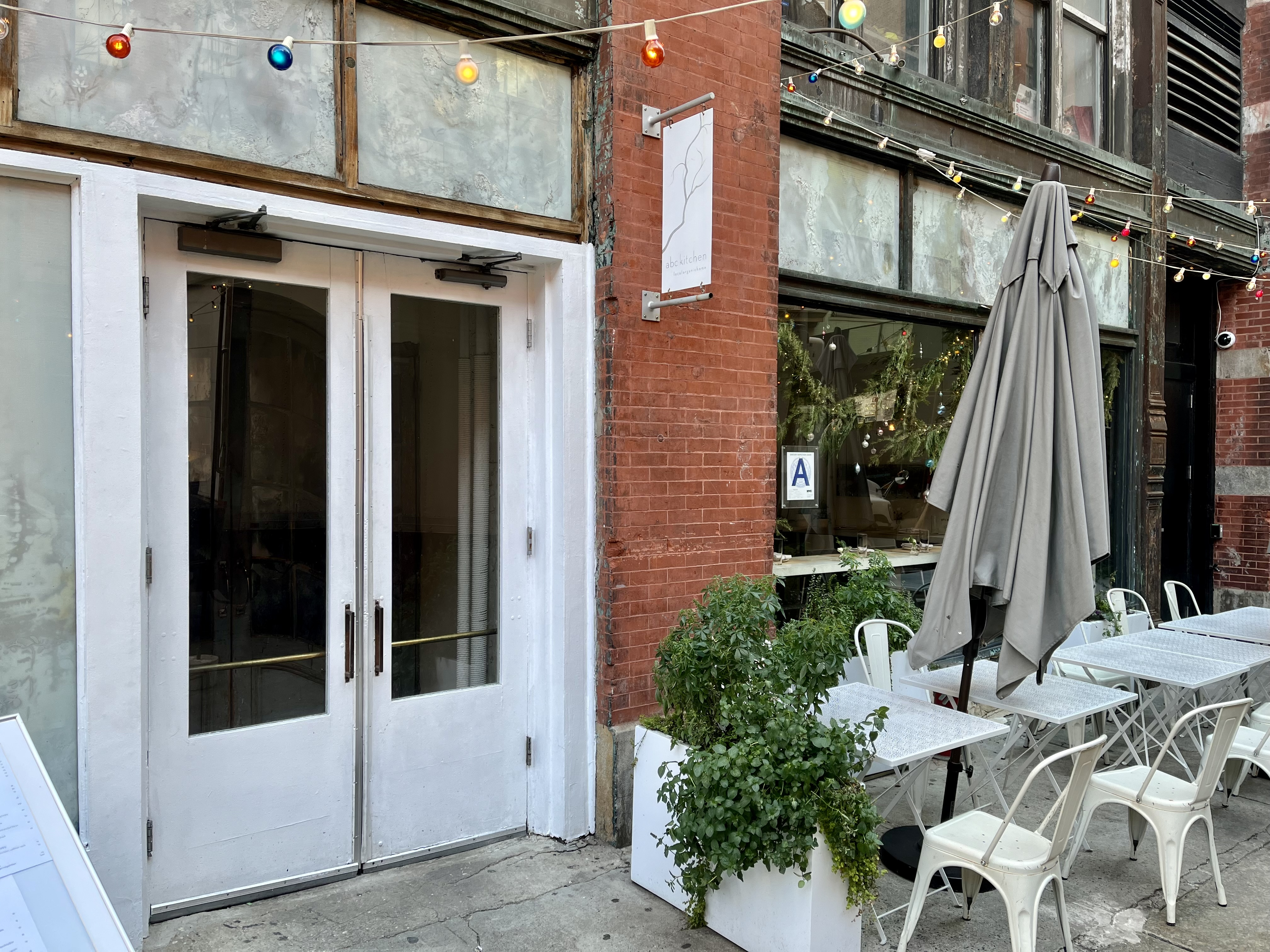
- ABC Kitchen in November 2023
- Interactive map of ABC Kitchen

Restaurant information
- Established: March 9, 2010
- Location: 35 East 18th Street, New York, New York, 10003
- Coordinates: 40.73775°N 73.98963°W
- Website: abckitchens.nyc

ABC Kitchen is a restaurant in the Flatiron District of Manhattan in New York City founded in 2010 by Jean-Georges Vongerichten. The restaurant received the James Beard Foundation Award for Best New Restaurant.

== See also ==
- James Beard Foundation Award: 2010s
