= Doyers Street =

Street in Manhattan, New York

Coordinates: 40.714354°N 73.998102°W

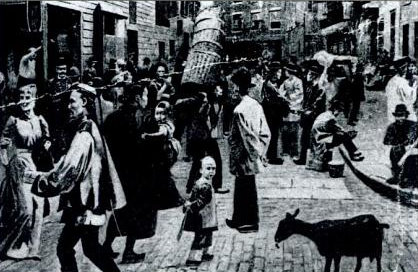
Doyers Street depicted in an 1898 postcard

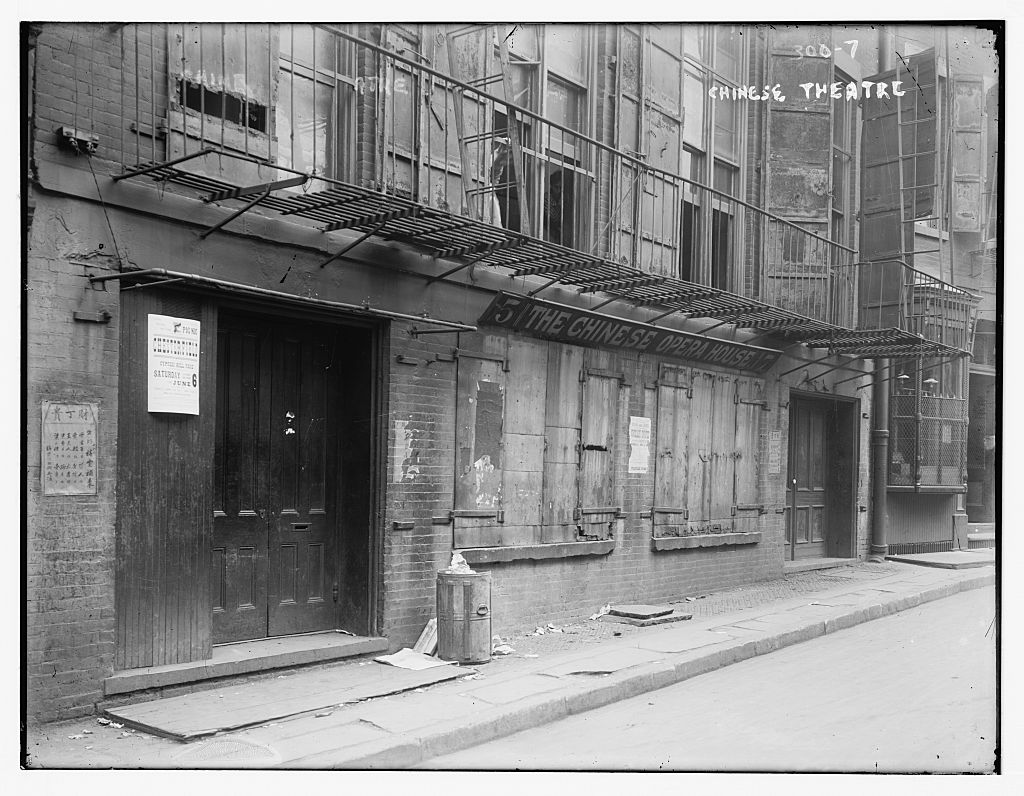
The city's first Chinese Opera House was on Doyers Street

Doyers Street is a 200-foot-long (61 m) street in the Chinatown neighborhood of Manhattan in New York City. It is one block long with a sharp bend in the middle. The street runs south and then southeast from a terminus at Pell Street to the intersection of Bowery, Chatham Square, and Division Street. Doyers Street contains several restaurants, barber shops, and hair stylists, as well as the Chinatown branch of the United States Postal Service. The Nom Wah Tea Parlor opened at 13 Doyers Street in 1920, and is still in operation. Longstanding business Ting's Gift Shop at 18 Doyers opened in 1957 and finally closed in mid-2024.

== Etymology ==
The street is named for Hendrik Doyers, an 18th-century Dutch immigrant who bought the property facing the Bowery in 1791. He operated a distillery at 6 Doyers Street and the Plough and Harrow tavern near the corner with Bowery.

== Notable sites ==
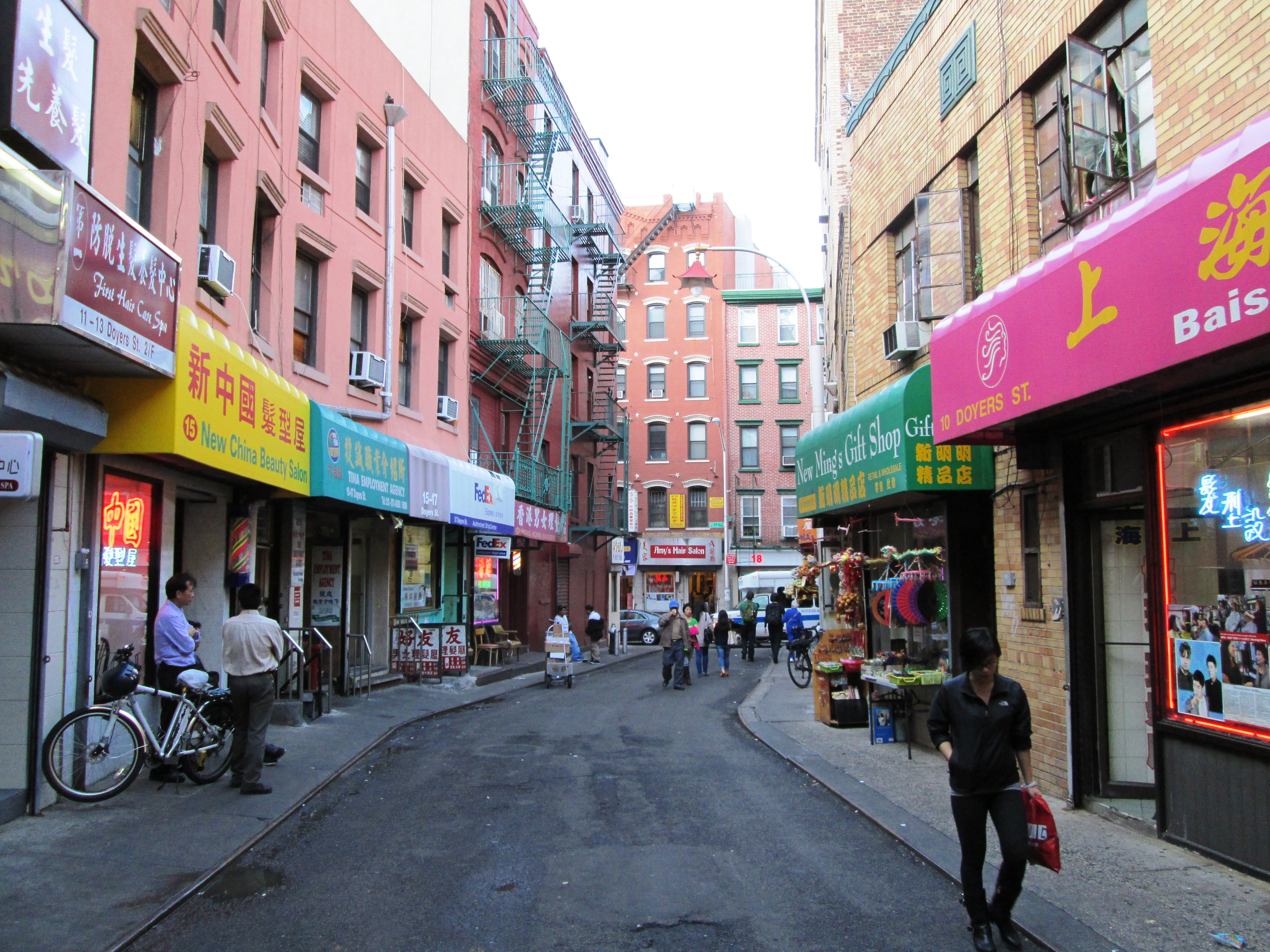
Doyers Street looking toward Pell Street in 2014

Doyers Street follows the old route of a stream. From 1893 to 1911, 5–7 Doyers Street was the site of the first Chinese-language theater in New York City. The theater was converted into a rescue mission for the homeless. In 1903, the theater was the site of a fundraiser by the Chinese community for Jewish victims of a massacre in Kishinev.

Nom Wah Tea Parlor, opened in 1920, is the oldest continuously running restaurant in Chinatown. The restaurant first opened at 15 Doyers Street and moved to 13 Doyers in 1968. Lei received the James Beard Foundation Award for Best New Restaurant in 2026, the year after it opened on Doyers Street.

Doyers Street, along with Pell Street, contains numerous barber shops and beauty salons. The barber shops attract customers, many of whom are Chinese, from as far away as Pennsylvania and Massachusetts. Doyers Street is also home to many speakeasies including Apotheke and Peachy's.

== Crimes and shootings ==
Early in the century, the bend in the street became known as the "Bloody Angle" or "Murder Alley" because of numerous killings among the Tong Gangs of Chinatown that lasted into the 1930s. Hatchets were frequently used, giving rise to the expression "hatchet man." In 1994, law enforcement officials said that more people had died violently at the "Bloody Angle" than at any other intersection in the United States. One shooting at the Chinese Theater in 1905 claimed the lives of three people, when members of the Hip Sing Tong fired on members of the On Leong Tong. The shooting took place at a time when the theater was packed with 400 people. In one 1909 incident, two members of the On Leong Tong were shot, one fatally, by members of the rival Four Brothers’ Society, or See Sing Tong. The shooting came after three members of the Hip Sing Tong were executed in Boston for the murder of a member of the On Leong Tong.

A number of old tenement houses are on Doyers Street, and these were sometimes subjected to fires. In 1910, four tenants died and five were injured when fire swept through the building at 15–17 Doyers. In 1939, a fire at the same building, described by The New York Times as "an old rabbit warren," killed seven persons and injured sixteen. Fighting the fire was made difficult because of the narrowness of the street, and Mayor Fiorello La Guardia said at the scene of the fire that someday Chinatown would have to be torn down and replaced. Chuck Connors, a Tammany Hall operative and the political boss of Chinatown in the early part of the century, had his headquarters at the Chatham Club at 6 Doyers, where Irving Berlin reportedly entertained.

== Usage ==
Writing in H. L. Mencken's American Mercury in 1926, Herbert Asbury pointed out that the street serves no logical purpose, because it is a link between Chatham Square, the Bowery, and Pell Street, which also connects to the Bowery a few feet from Doyers. He called it "a crazy street, and there has never been any excuse for it." He described Doyers Street as the "nerve center" of Chinatown because of the Chinese theater and Bloody Angle. As Doyers and Pell Streets are accessible only from southbound Bowery and traffic from both Bowery and Doyers Street can continue only to southbound Chatham Square, Doyers Street is very lightly used.

By 2011, the street was lined with barbershops, restaurants, a United States Post Office at 6 Doyers Street, and an employment agency at 15-17 Doyers Street that serves recent immigrants of all ethnic backgrounds. As part of a September 2017 pilot program, the Chinatown Partnership converted Doyers Street to a pedestrian-only street during the daytime for one month. If the test was successful, the program would be expanded. The 100 feet (30 m) of the street between Bowery and the Post Office would be available for commercial access. The pavement of Doyers Street was painted in 2021 with Rice Terraces, a 4,800-square-foot (450 m^{2}) mural by Dasic Fernández. In September 2021, Chinatown Mural Project created a new tribute mural that honored the memory of beloved photographer Corky Lee on Doyers Street. During the same month, yellow and green lanterns were hung up along Doyers Street as part of the Light Up Chinatown initiative.
