= Jean Joho =

French-American chef and restaurateur

- Born: Barr, Bas-Rhin, France
- Education: L'Auberge de L'lll
- Culinary career
- Current restaurant
- The Eiffel Tower Restaurant in Las Vegas
- Previous restaurant
- Everest
- Awardss
- Restaurateur of the Year (Gayot); Best Chef of the Year (Bon Appetit); Best American Chef: Midwest (James Beard Foundation)
- Website: www.chefjoho.com

Jean Joho is a French-American chef and restaurateur. He was the chef and proprietor of Everest in Chicago (founded in 1986, closed in 2020), Paris Club Bistro & Bar and Studio Paris in Chicago, The Eiffel Tower Restaurant in Las Vegas, and Brasserie Jo first in Chicago, then in Boston. He has received awards including Restaurateur of the Year from Gayot and Best American Chef: Midwest from the James Beard Foundation.

== Early life and education ==
Joho was born in Barr, France, Joho was already working in his aunt's restaurant kitchen, peeling vegetables in full chef uniform and hat, by age six. At age 11, he spent his summer making cheese in Marseille. His formal training began at age 13 at L'Auberge de L'lll under master chef Paul Haeberlin.

== Career ==
Joho worked in kitchens throughout France, Italy, and Switzerland and by age 23, Joho was the sous chef at a Michelin three-star restaurant where he commanded a 35-person staff. While studying at the Hotel Restaurant School in Strasbourg, Joho immersed himself in the hotel and restaurant business, as well as the arts of pastry, cheese, and wine.

Joho's rise to international success began on the 40th floor of the Chicago Stock Exchange with Everest, which is now one of the world's premier dining rooms and a Relais & Chateaux property. He is a managing partner at Lettuce Entertain You Enterprises and has establishments across the country as well as partnership in several other concepts, including Chicago's Nacional 27 and M Burger.

In 2013, Chef Joho and his team at Everest were awarded four stars by Chicago Tribune journalist Phil Vettel. He was named Restaurateur of the Year for 2012 by Gayot.

Joho is the head chef at The Eiffel Tower Restaurant at the Paris hotel located on the Las Vegas Strip.

In 2022, Chef Joho teamed with Lettuce and Marriott International to create two new concepts in the new St. Regis Chicago. Miru, a Japanese-inspired restaurant that opened in May 2023, and Tre Dita, a Tuscan steakhouse in March 2024.

== Written works ==
Jean Joho is the author of The Eiffel Tower Cookbook (Chronicle Books, 2008, ISBN 0811860477, 144 pp.). In this cookbook, he shares 50 of his signature dishes.

== Personal life ==
Joho resides in Chicago.

== Awards and accolades ==
- Restaurateur of the Year, 2012, Gayot
