= The Amazing Spider-Man 2 =

2014 film by Marc Webb

- Theatrical release poster
- Directed by: Marc Webb
- Screenplay by: Alex Kurtzman; Roberto Orci; Jeff Pinkner
- Story by: Alex Kurtzman; Roberto Orci; Jeff Pinkner; James Vanderbilt
- Based on: Spider-Man by: Stan Lee; Steve Ditko
- Produced by: Avi Arad; Matt Tolmach
- Starring: Andrew Garfield; Emma Stone; Jamie Foxx; Dane DeHaan; Campbell Scott; Embeth Davidtz; Colm Feore; Paul Giamatti; Sally Field
- Cinematography: Dan Mindel
- Edited by: Pietro Scalia
- Music by: Hans Zimmer; The Magnificent Six (Note: Pharrell Williams, Johnny Marr, Mike Einziger, Junkie XL, Steve Mazzaro, and Andrew Kawczynski)
- Production companies: Columbia Pictures; Marvel Entertainment; Arad Productions, Inc.; Matt Tolmach Productions; Ingenious Film Studios
- Distributed by: Sony Pictures Releasing
- Release dates: March 31, 2014 (Tokyo); May 2, 2014 (United States)
- Running time: 142 minutes
- Country: United States
- Language: English
- Budget: $200–293 million
- Box office: $717 million

The Amazing Spider-Man 2 (internationally titled as The Amazing Spider-Man 2: Rise of Electro) is a 2014 American superhero film based on the Marvel Comics character Spider-Man. The sequel to The Amazing Spider-Man (2012), it was directed by Marc Webb and written by Alex Kurtzman, Roberto Orci, and Jeff Pinkner from a story by Kurtzman, Orci, Pinkner and James Vanderbilt. Andrew Garfield stars as Peter Parker / Spider-Man, alongside Emma Stone, Jamie Foxx, Dane DeHaan, Campbell Scott, Embeth Davidtz, Colm Feore, Paul Giamatti and Sally Field. In the film, Peter tries to protect his girlfriend, Gwen Stacy, as he investigates his parents' death while also encountering the supervillain Electro and his childhood friend Harry Osborn.

Development of The Amazing Spider-Man 2 began after the success of The Amazing Spider-Man. DeHaan, Giamatti, Felicity Jones, and Chris Cooper were cast between December 2012 and February 2013. Filming took place in New York City from February to June 2013. The film was released in 2D, 3D, RealD 3D, and IMAX 3D on May 2, 2014 in the United States by Sony Pictures Releasing through its Columbia Pictures label, with two international premieres being held between March 31 and April 10 of that year. The film grossed $717 million worldwide, making it the ninth-highest-grossing film of 2014.

The Amazing Spider-Man film series was originally intended to continue with at least two more sequels, as well as several spin-off films featuring other characters. In February 2015, Sony Pictures and Marvel Studios initiated a deal to share the Spider-Man film rights and reboot the character within the Marvel Cinematic Universe (MCU), cancelling future projects in the Amazing Spider-Man series. Tom Holland succeeded Garfield as Peter Parker / Spider-Man in Captain America: Civil War (2016) before leading a new series of Spider-Man films set in the MCU, beginning with Spider-Man: Homecoming (2017). Both Garfield and Foxx reprised their roles in Holland's third film, Spider-Man: No Way Home (2021), which linked the Amazing Spider-Man films to the MCU using the concept of the multiverse.

== Plot ==
Richard Parker, a scientist who left Oscorp, records a video message to explain his disappearance. He and his wife Mary flee aboard a private jet, which is soon hijacked by an assassin. The jet crashes and kills both Richard and Mary.

Years later, Richard and Mary's son, Peter, continues to fight crime as the vigilante Spider-Man. After apprehending the Russian criminal Aleksei Sytsevich, Peter attends his high school graduation. He is dating Gwen Stacy but is torn by guilt, having promised Gwen's late father that he would avoid her to keep her safe. Due to Peter's reservations about the relationship, Gwen breaks up with him. A few months later, Peter's childhood friend, Harry Osborn, returns home to see his dying father, Norman Osborn, the CEO of Oscorp. Norman explains that his fatal illness is genetic and that Harry will soon begin having symptoms. Norman dies soon after, and Harry inherits Oscorp.

While working in an Oscorp laboratory, mild-mannered electrical engineer Max Dillon accidentally falls into a tank of genetically engineered electric eels, causing him to mutate and gain electric abilities. Unaware of the extent of his power, Max wanders into Times Square, where he inadvertently causes a power outage. Peter arrives and helps the police apprehend Max, who is then incarcerated at Ravencroft Institute. Gwen tells Peter that she will move to England if she earns a scholarship to Oxford University.

The first symptoms of Harry's illness begin showing, and he uses information his father gave him to deduce that Spider-Man's blood could save him. He asks Peter, who has been selling photos of Spider-Man to the Daily Bugle, to help him find Spider-Man. Peter is unsure what effects his blood would have on Harry, but is worried it could cause a dangerous mutation. Disguised as Spider-Man, Peter refuses to give blood to Harry, which enrages him. The vice president of Oscorp, Donald Menken, frames Harry for covering up Max's accident and takes control of the company. Harry offers to liberate Max, who now calls himself "Electro", in exchange for getting Harry back inside the Oscorp building; Max agrees.

Upon returning to Oscorp, Harry forces Menken to inject him with venom from genetically altered spiders. The venom mutates Harry and degrades his sanity. Meanwhile, Peter finds his father's video message, which reveals that his parents had to flee because Richard refused to collaborate with Norman on the creation of biogenetic weapons. Gwen is offered the Oxford scholarship, after which Peter professes his love for her and decides to move to England with her.

Max causes a power outage at a power station. Peter and Gwen arrive and overload Max's body with electricity, killing him. Harry arrives riding a mechanized glider and wearing an armored suit equipped with weapons, and discovers that Peter is Spider-Man. Swearing vengeance, he takes Gwen to the top of a clock tower. Peter subdues Harry but is unable to stop Gwen from falling to her death. Wracked by guilt and sorrow, Peter ends his career as Spider-Man.

Five months later, Harry is incarcerated at Ravencroft. When his associate, Gustav Fiers, visits him, Harry orders Fiers to break Sytsevich out of prison and provide him with Oscorp weaponry. Equipped with an electromechanical suit of armor, Sytsevich dubs himself "The Rhino" and rampages through the streets. Peter, re-inspired after watching a video of Gwen's graduation speech, returns to confront him as Spider-Man.

== Cast ==
- Andrew Garfield as Peter Parker / Spider-Man: A college student who developed spider-like abilities after being bitten by a genetically-modified spider, which he uses to fight crime as the masked vigilante Spider-Man. Garfield said his performance involved exploring the idea of "being fatherless, being motherless, searching for purpose and finding a purpose within himself". Max Charles plays a young Peter Parker.
- Emma Stone as Gwen Stacy: Peter's girlfriend. Stone said that in the film, Gwen saves Peter "more than he saves her ... He's the muscle, she's the brains."
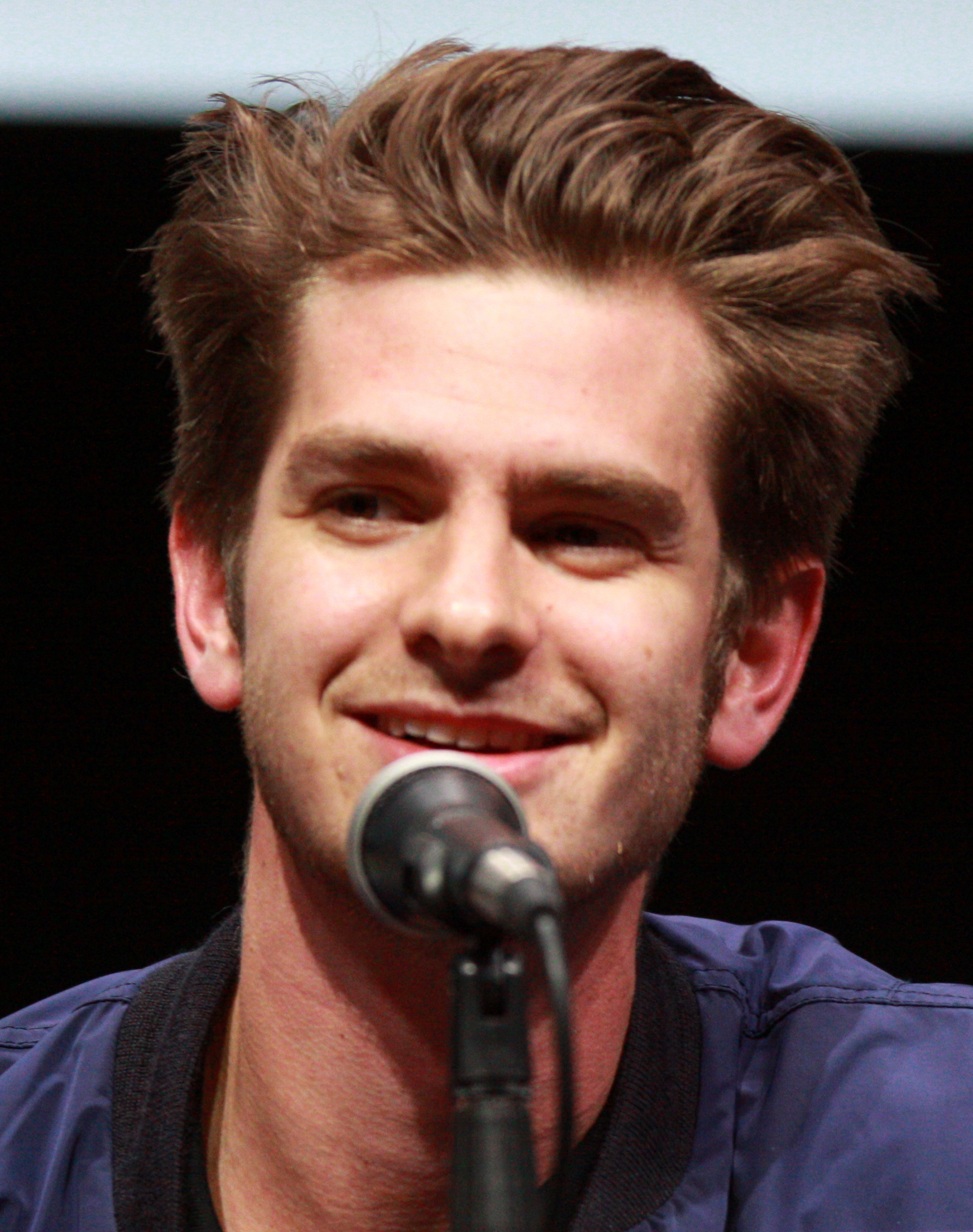
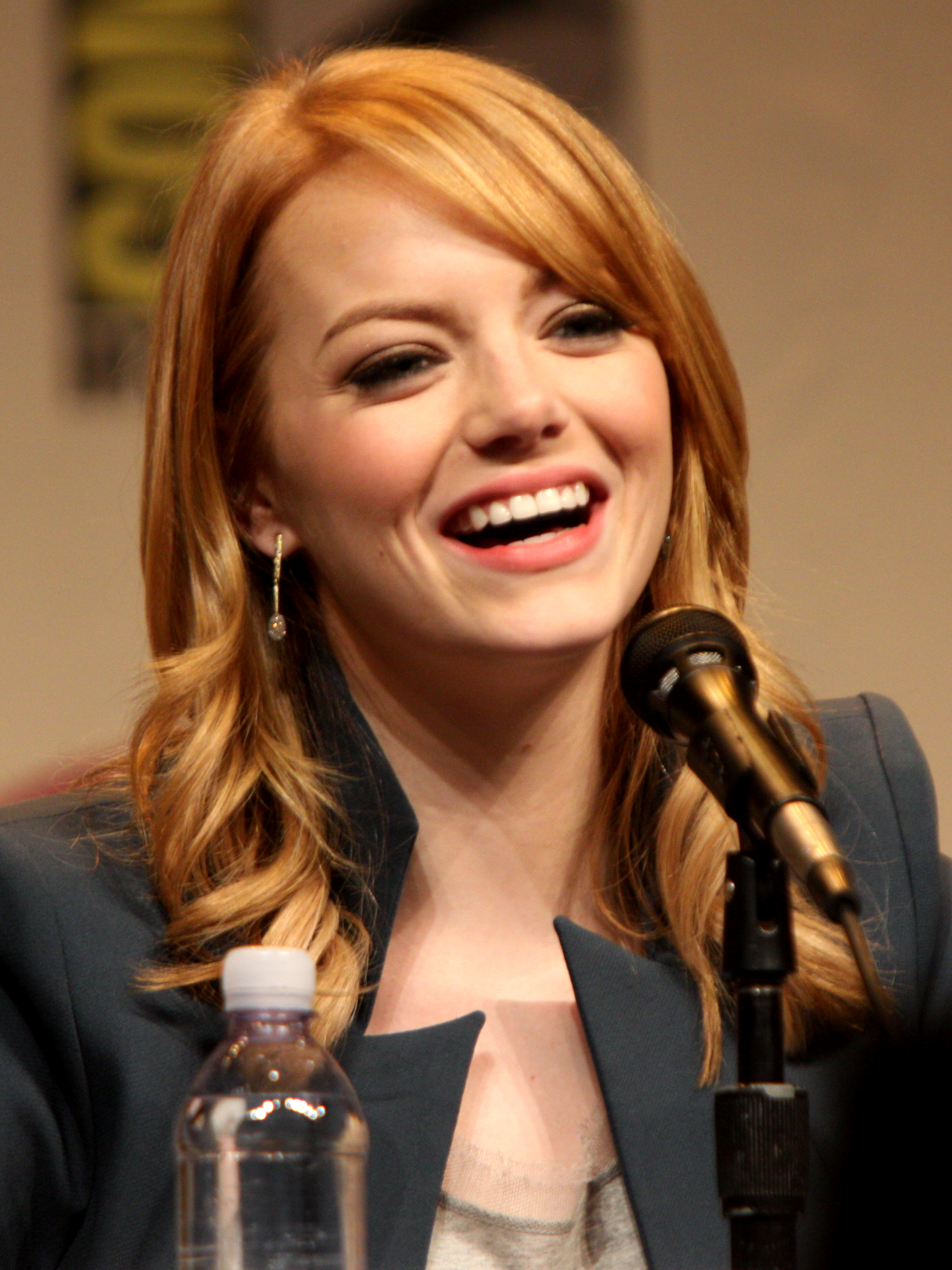
Andrew Garfield (left) and Emma Stone at San Diego Comic-Con in 2013
- Jamie Foxx as Max Dillon / Electro: An Oscorp electrical engineer who becomes a powerful electrokinetic being.
- Dane DeHaan as Harry Osborn / Green Goblin: Peter's childhood friend and the son of Norman Osborn.
- Campbell Scott as Richard Parker: Peter's father.
- Embeth Davidtz as Mary Parker: Peter's mother.
- Colm Feore as Donald Menken: Vice president of Oscorp.
- Paul Giamatti as Aleksei Sytsevich / The Rhino: A criminal who is captured by Spider-Man and later freed from prison by Harry.
- Sally Field as May Parker: Peter's aunt. In a 2016 interview, Field criticized the lack of depth in her role, saying, "It's really hard to find a three-dimensional character in it, and you work it as much as you can, but you can't put ten pounds of shit in a five-pound bag."

Felicity Jones portrays Felicia Hardy, an Oscorp employee who is loyal to Harry. Jones is credited only as "Felicia" in the film, but her surname was listed as "Hardy" in a marketing video. Marton Csokas portrays Ashley Kafka, the head of Ravencroft Institute, while B. J. Novak appears as Alistair Smythe, Dillon's superior at Oscorp. Kari Coleman, Charlie DePew, Skyler Gisondo, and Jacob Rodier reprise their roles from The Amazing Spider-Man as Helen Stacy, Philip Stacy, Howard Stacy, and Simon Stacy, respectively, with Rodier being uncredited. Also uncredited are the appearances of Chris Cooper as Norman Osborn and Denis Leary as George Stacy. Spider-Man co-creator Stan Lee has a cameo appearance as a guest at Peter and Gwen's graduation ceremony. Michael Massee reprises his role as the "Man in the Shadows" from the first film, now credited as "Gustav Fiers (The Gentleman)". Aidy Bryant appears as a woman dressed as the Statue of Liberty.

== Production ==
=== Development ===
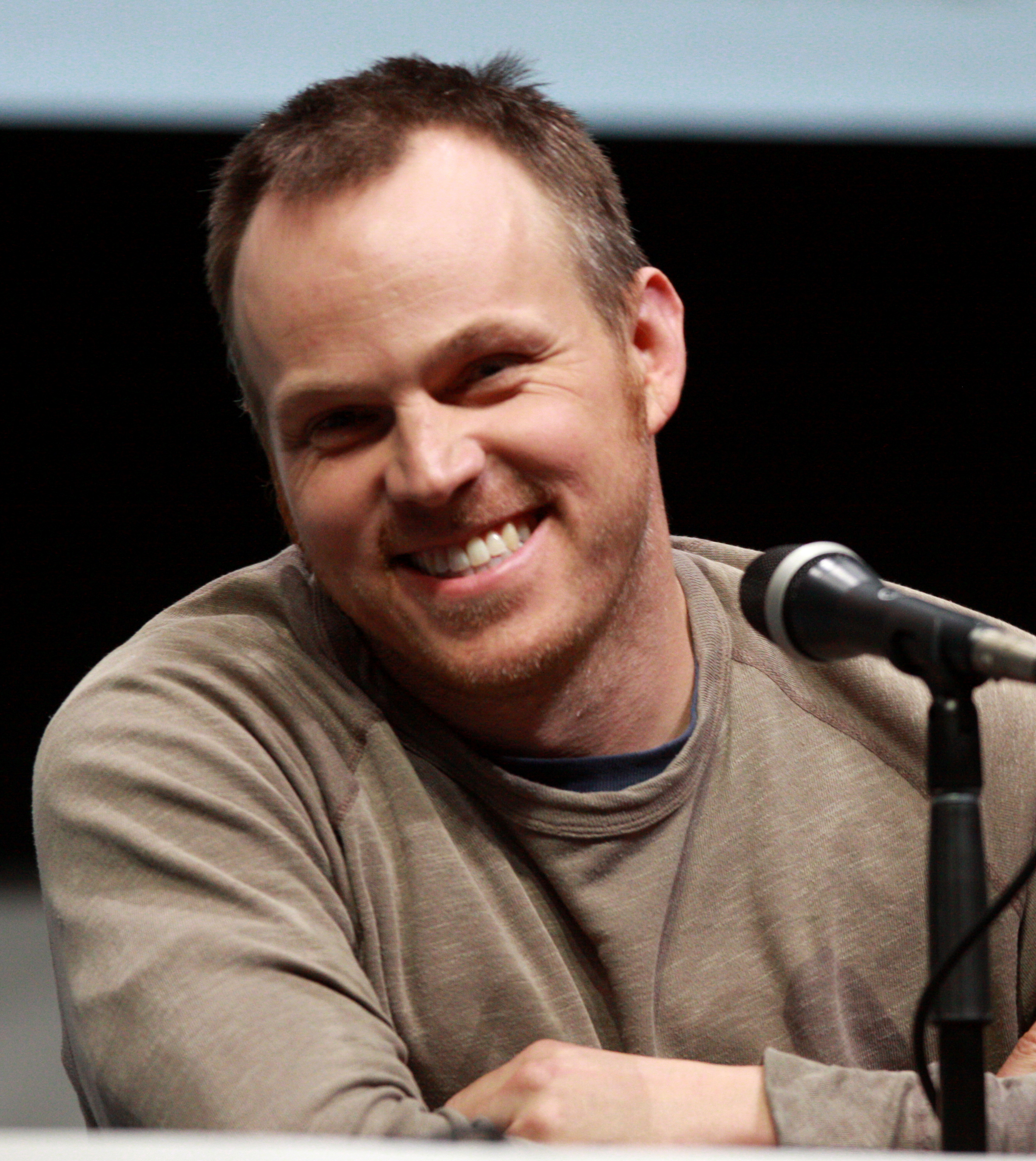
Director Marc Webb at San Diego Comic Con in 2013

More than a year before the 2012 release of The Amazing Spider-Man, one of its screenwriters, James Vanderbilt, was hired to write a sequel. Vanderbilt's first draft was eventually rewritten by Roberto Orci, Alex Kurtzman and Jeff Pinkner, all of whom would receive screenwriting credits. Following the release of the first film, there was uncertainty that director Marc Webb would return for the sequel. He had been paid roughly $1 million to direct The Amazing Spider-Man, and was seeking a pay raise in the wake of the first film's success. By September 2012, it was confirmed that Webb would return to direct The Amazing Spider-Man 2, and that Andrew Garfield would reprise his role as Spider-Man. For this film, Spider-Man's costume was redesigned to be more faithful to the comics.

In December 2012, it was confirmed that the film's villain, Electro, would be played by Jamie Foxx, who said the character's design was based on the Ultimate Marvel version of Electro. (Note: Attributed to multiple references:) Douglas Booth, Sam Claflin, Brady Corbet, Alden Ehrenreich, Boyd Holbrook, Michael B. Jordan and Eddie Redmayne were considered for the role of Harry Osborn before Dane DeHaan was ultimately cast. (Note: Attributed to multiple references:) In February 2013, Chris Cooper was cast as Norman Osborn.

Shailene Woodley was cast as Mary Jane Watson, and her scenes were filmed by March 2013. However, by mid-June the decision was made to cut the character from the film, in order to streamline the story and focus on Peter and Gwen's relationship. (Note: Attributed to multiple references:)

=== Filming ===
Principal photography for The Amazing Spider-Man 2 began on February 4, 2013 and ended on June 25. The film was shot on 35mm film in the anamorphic format, instead of being shot digitally like the preceding film. (Note: Attributed to multiple references:) It was the first Spider-Man film to be shot entirely in New York state, and was the largest film production ever in the state at the time.

Several scenes were shot on Main Street in Rochester and then digitally altered to look like they occurred in New York City. A car chase scene was also filmed in Rochester, which had less restrictive speed laws than New York City. Another scene was shot in Nom Wah Tea Parlor in Manhattan's Chinatown. The decision to film in Williamsburg, Brooklyn during the Passover holiday threatened to cause problems with parking and was criticized for being culturally insensitive. After feedback from residents and Jewish leaders, the filmmakers adjusted their production schedule. (Note: Attributed to multiple references:) Soundstage filming was done at Grumman Studios and Gold Coast Studios, both in Bethpage, New York, and at the Marcy Armory in Brooklyn.

To transform Foxx into Electro, makeup artists would spend four and a half hours to applying blue paint and prosthetics to his body. While filming the scene in which Spider-Man binds Gwen's hand to a car, Stone went off script and blurted out, "Peter!" The ad-libbed line made it into the finished film.

The scene in which Gustav Fiers visits Harry while he is incarcerated at Ravencroft was a late addition to the film. During test screenings without the scene, viewers found it unclear whether Harry had died in battle with Spider-Man, been incarcerated, or escaped, so the filmmakers added the scene to establish Harry's fate. Another change was the removal of a scene in which Richard Parker meets Peter at Gwen's grave. After much deliberation, the scene was cut because it made the story too complicated and made Peter seem infantile, as he needed his father's support to resume being Spider-Man.

=== Visual effects ===
Sony Pictures Imageworks created a total of 1,600 visual effects shots for the film, which was post-converted from 2D to 3D. (Note: Attributed to multiple references:) The effects for the scene in which Spider-Man battles Electro in Times Square took a year to complete. To create a digital version of Times Square, the crew took over 36,000 photos, including photos of over 100 billboards. (Note: Attributed to multiple references:) Roughly twenty layers of digital electricity were applied to Electro to give the appearance of energy moving under his skin.

== Music ==
James Horner had composed the music for The Amazing Spider-Man, but declined to return for The Amazing Spider-Man 2. To create the score for the sequel, Webb formed a group of musicians consisting of Pharrell Williams, Johnny Marr, Mike Einziger, Junkie XL, Steve Mazzaro and Andrew Kawczynski, who all assisted composer Hans Zimmer. The group was credited as The Magnificent Six, a reference to the Sinister Six. Alicia Keys and Kendrick Lamar collaborated with Zimmer and Williams to produce the song "It's On Again", which is heard during the film's closing credits. The soundtrack for the film was released on April 18, 2014, by Columbia Records and Madison Gate Records.

== Marketing ==
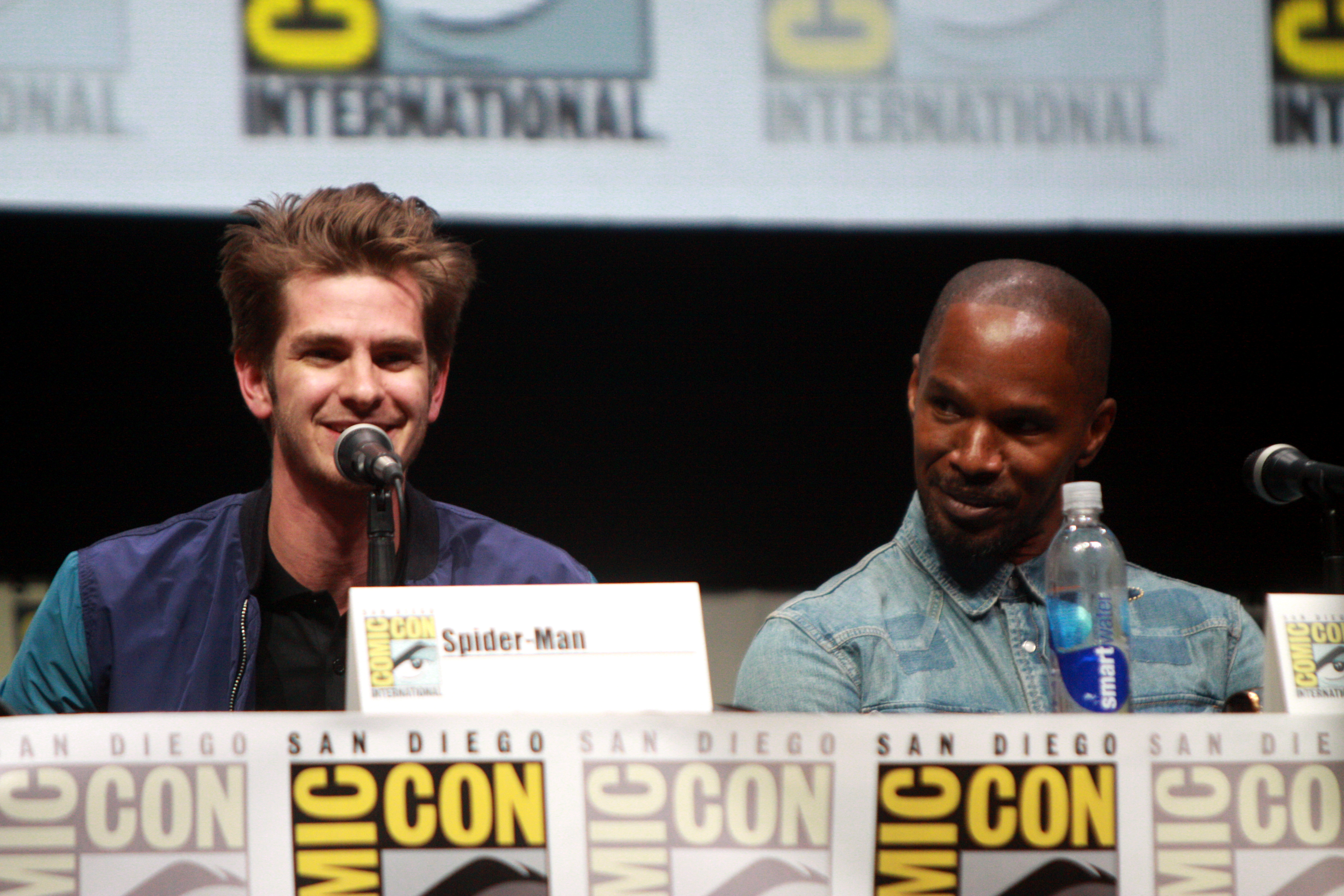
Andrew Garfield and Jamie Foxx promoting The Amazing Spider-Man 2 at San Diego Comic-Con in 2013.

The release of the film in the United Kingdom was moved up to April 16, 2014, two days ahead of its original release date of April 18. Deadline reported that in addition to its production budget, the film had a marketing budget of $180–190 million. At San Diego Comic-Con in July 2013, Sony released a clip from the film featuring Jamie Foxx as Electro. A four-minute trailer was also shown, and although it was not publicly released, it was eventually leaked on the internet. Viral marketing for the film included a version of the Daily Bugle on the blogging service Tumblr. (Note: Attributed to multiple references:)

In December 2013, it was announced that new footage from the film would be presented during New Year's Eve festivities at Times Square. In February 2014, Disney Consumer Products announced a line of merchandise for the film at the American International Toy Fair. The following month, Gameloft and Marvel announced the launch of a mobile game for smartphones and tablets titled The Amazing Spider-Man 2, which was later released for home consoles. (Note: Attributed to multiple references:) The film was promoted during the 2014 Earth Hour campaign, with the cast in attendance at the launch of the Singapore event. Kellogg's and Evian were promotional partners of the film, and McDonald's released tie-in Happy Meal toys.

A mid-credit teaser scene from X-Men: Days of Future Past was added to the film after its London premiere, due to an existing deal between Webb and 20th Century Fox. (Note: Attributed to multiple references:) The scene's inclusion sparked confusion among some viewers in the United Kingdom, who thought it meant a crossover film between the X-Men and Spider-Man franchises was being developed.

In March 2024, Sony announced that all of its live-action Spider-Man films would be re-released in theaters as part of Columbia Pictures' 100th anniversary celebration. The Amazing Spider-Man 2 was re-released on May 13, 2024.

== Release ==
=== Box office ===
The Amazing Spider-Man 2 grossed $203.6 million in the United States and Canada and $513.3 million in other countries for a worldwide gross of $716.9 million. Deadline Hollywood calculated the net profit of the film to be $70.38 million, making it one of the top 20 most profitable releases of 2014.

In the U.S. and Canada, the film grossed $8.7 million via early screenings, which were held on Thursday night before the official Friday release. The film finished its opening weekend at the top of the box office with $91.6 million, almost $30 million more than the opening-weekend gross of the first film. The Amazing Spider-Man 2 had the second-highest domestic opening weekend of 2014, behind Captain America: The Winter Soldier. In its second weekend, the film grossed $35.5 million and dropped to second at the box office behind the newly released Neighbors.

In other countries, The Amazing Spider-Man 2 opened on April 16, 2014. On its opening day it earned $2.73 million in the United Kingdom, $1.44 million in Australia, $1.11 million in Germany and $190,000 in Belgium. Within a few days, the UK opening gross reached $15 million, surpassing The Lego Movie to achieve the highest UK opening weekend of the year. The film's release in India was the biggest opening weekend for an American film at that point with a gross of ₹41 crore (US$4.4 million). The film's final box office collection was $13.44 million in India, one of the highest of all time by a Hollywood film. In China, the film played on 11,002 screens, which was the widest release of any film in history. On its opening day in Hong Kong, the film earned $1.23 million, the highest opening gross in the territory.

=== Home media ===
The Amazing Spider-Man 2 was released by Sony Pictures Home Entertainment for digital download on August 5, 2014, and was released on Blu-ray, Blu-ray 3D and DVD on August 19. The Blu-ray/DVD release includes an alternate ending in which Peter's father meets him at Gwen's grave. The film received a standalone 4K UHD Blu-ray release on March 1, 2016, and was later included in The Spider-Man Legacy Collection, a 4K UHD Blu-ray collection which includes the first five Spider-Man films, and which was released on October 17, 2017.

In April 2021, Sony signed a deal with Disney to allow Sony's films, including past Spider-Man films, films in Sony's Spider-Man Universe, and other Marvel content to stream on Hulu and Disney+. A significant number of Sony films began streaming on Hulu starting in June 2021. While the deal only concerned the United States, films from Sony Pictures—including The Amazing Spider-Man 2—began to appear on Disney+ in regions outside of the U.S. as early as June 2022.

== Reception ==
=== Critical response ===
On the review aggregator Rotten Tomatoes, The Amazing Spider-Man 2 has an approval rating of 50% based on 312 reviews, and an average rating of 5.8/10. The site's critical consensus reads: "While the cast is outstanding and the special effects are top-notch, the latest installment of the Spidey saga suffers from an unfocused narrative and an overabundance of characters." On Metacritic, the film has a weighted average score of 53 out of 100 based on 50 critics. Audiences polled by CinemaScore gave the film an average grade of "B+" on an A+ to F scale.

Kim Newman of Empire called the film "a satisfying second issue with thrills, heartbreak, gasps, and a perfectly judged slingshot ending." Leslie Felperin of The Hollywood Reporter praised Garfield's performance and described the film as "emotionally weightier and more satisfying than its predecessor" but felt it had too many villain plotlines. Tom Huddleston of Time Out thought that fans of The Amazing Spider-Man would enjoy the sequel, while others "will long for the boldness, scope and wit of The Avengers." Guy Lodge of Variety felt the film was too long, but praised the chemistry of Garfield and Stone. Marjorie Baumgarten of The Austin Chronicle criticized the originality of The Amazing Spider-Man 2.

Oliver Gettel of the Los Angeles Times and Tim Robey of The Telegraph both felt the film had too many villains, with Gettel also criticizing the high number of plot lines. Robey believed that the film was redeemed by the chemistry between Garfield and Stone. Mike McGranaghan of The Aisle Seat and Michael Burgin of Paste Magazine compared the film to the unpopular 1997 superhero film Batman & Robin. In similar fashion, Jon Niccum of The Kansas City Star wrote, "One must go back to the Joel Schumacher Batman fiascos to find a director more disconnected from his superhero source material." Writing for Digital Spy, Simon Reynolds said the film had too many unresolved character arcs. Richard Roeper felt The Amazing Spider-Man 2 was too long, with too many characters and subplots.

=== Awards ===
Award	Category	Recipient	Result	Ref.
Teen Choice Awards	Choice Movie: Sci-Fi/Fantasy	The Amazing Spider-Man 2	Nominated	
Teen Choice Awards	Choice Movie Actor: Sci-Fi/Fantasy	Andrew Garfield	Nominated	
Teen Choice Awards	Choice Movie Actress: Sci-Fi/Fantasy	Emma Stone	Nominated	
Teen Choice Awards	Choice Movie: Villain	Jamie Foxx	Nominated	
Teen Choice Awards	Choice Movie: Liplock	Andrew Garfield and Emma Stone	Nominated	
Kids' Choice Awards	Favorite Movie	The Amazing Spider-Man 2	Nominated	
Kids' Choice Awards	Favorite Movie Actor	Jamie Foxx	Nominated	
Kids' Choice Awards	Favorite Movie Actress	Emma Stone	Won	
Kids' Choice Awards	Favorite Male Action Star	Andrew Garfield	Nominated	
Kids' Choice Awards	Favorite Villain	Jamie Foxx	Nominated	
Saturn Awards	Best Comic-to-Film Motion Picture	The Amazing Spider-Man 2	Nominated	
ASCAP Awards	Top Box Office Films	The Amazing Spider-Man 2	Won	
ASCAP Awards	ASCAP Honors Top Film & TV Composers	Hans Zimmer and The Magnificent Six	Won	

== Cancelled sequels and spin-offs ==
Sony had originally intended The Amazing Spider-Man 2 to launch an expansive film universe around Spider-Man to compete with the Marvel Cinematic Universe (MCU). In 2013, before the release of The Amazing Spider-Man 2, Sony announced a third Amazing Spider-Man film with a release date of June 10, 2016, and a fourth film with a release date of May 4, 2018. The third film was to be written by Alex Kurtzman, Roberto Orci, and Jeff Pinkner. There were also plans for a two-part Sinister Six spin-off film written and directed by Drew Goddard, and a Venom film written by Kurtzman, Orci, and Ed Solomon, and directed by Kurtzman. (Note: Attributed to multiple references:) Garfield had discussions with Goddard about reprising his role as Spider-Man in Sinister Six, which had a planned release date of November 11, 2016. (Note: Attributed to multiple references:) By August 2014, Sony had hired Lisa Joy to write the script for a 2017 film featuring Felicia Hardy / Black Cat. The studio had also announced plans for a spin-off based on Spider-Man 2099 to be released in late 2017.

Between December 2013 and the release of The Amazing Spider-Man 2 in May 2014, both Webb and Garfield stated they would return for the third film. With regards to the fourth film, Webb said he would not be directing, while Garfield was uncertain of his involvement. (Note: Attributed to multiple references:) Following the mixed reviews and poor box office performance of The Amazing Spider-Man 2, the future of the franchise became unclear. By July 2014, Orci had left the third film to work on Star Trek Beyond (2016). The Amazing Spider-Man 3—which would have featured Chris Cooper returning as Norman Osborn and depicted Peter recovering from Gwen Stacy's death—was delayed to an unspecified date in 2018, and The Amazing Spider-Man 4 was moved to an unknown date. (Note: Attributed to multiple references:)

As a result of the 2014 Sony Pictures hack, Emma Stone was revealed to be in talks to return as a resurrected Gwen / Carnage in The Amazing Spider-Man 4. It was also revealed that Sam Raimi was in talks to direct a new trilogy featuring Maguire's version of Spider-Man, along with a Spider-Man vs. The Amazing Spider-Man film that would have featured both Maguire's and Garfield's respective versions of the character. In early 2015, a deal between Sony and Marvel Studios was reached that allowed Spider-Man to be in the MCU, effectively cancelling The Amazing Spider-Man franchise. Goddard stated that the Sony hacks also cancelled his Sinister Six film.

In 2021, Marvel Studios and Sony Pictures co-produced Spider-Man: No Way Home. In the film, the Tobey Maguire version of Spider-Man and the Andrew Garfield version of Spider-Man travel through the multiverse and encounter the MCU Spider-Man, played by Tom Holland. The film also features villains from earlier Spider-Man films, including Rhys Ifans' Lizard and Jamie Foxx's Electro. (Note: Attributed to multiple references:)

== See also ==
- Spider-Man in film
