= James Beard Foundation Award for Best New Restaurant =

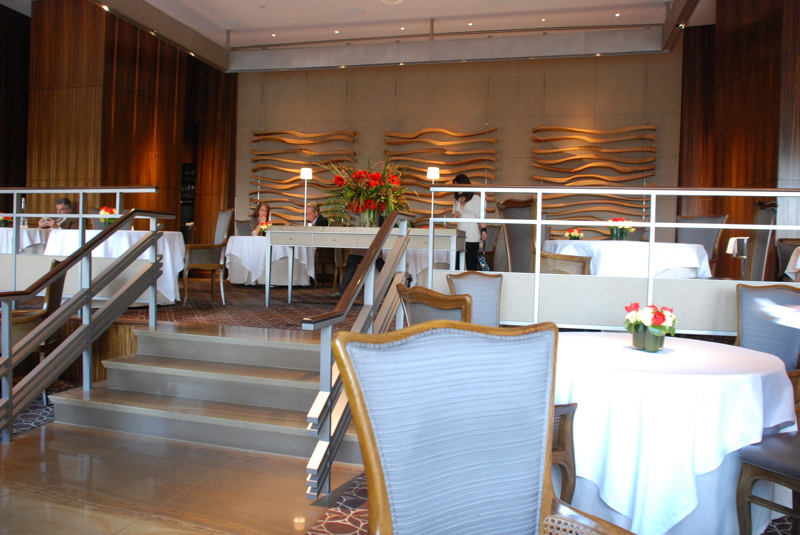
Per Se, New York City

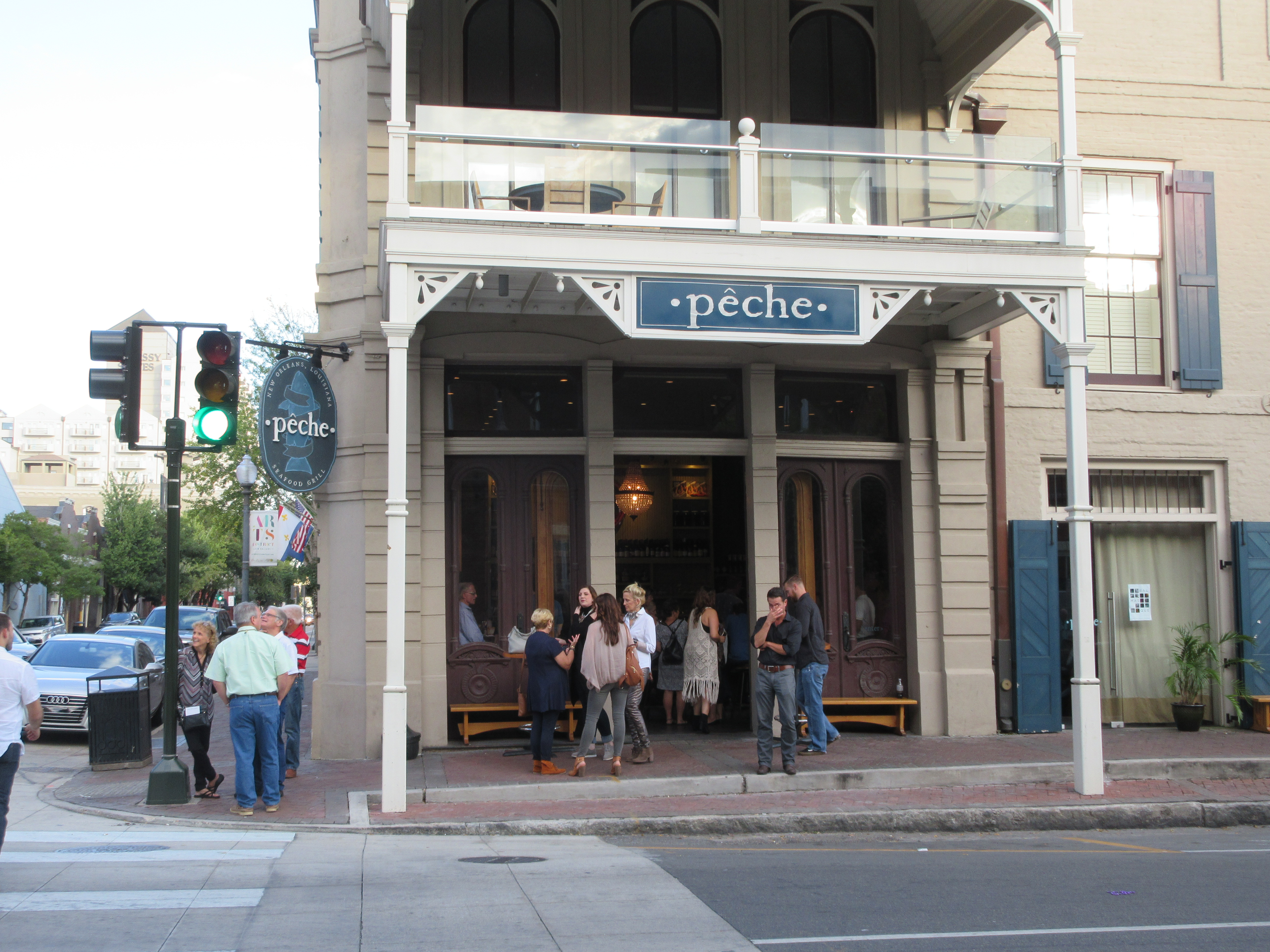
Pêche Seafood Grill, New Orleans

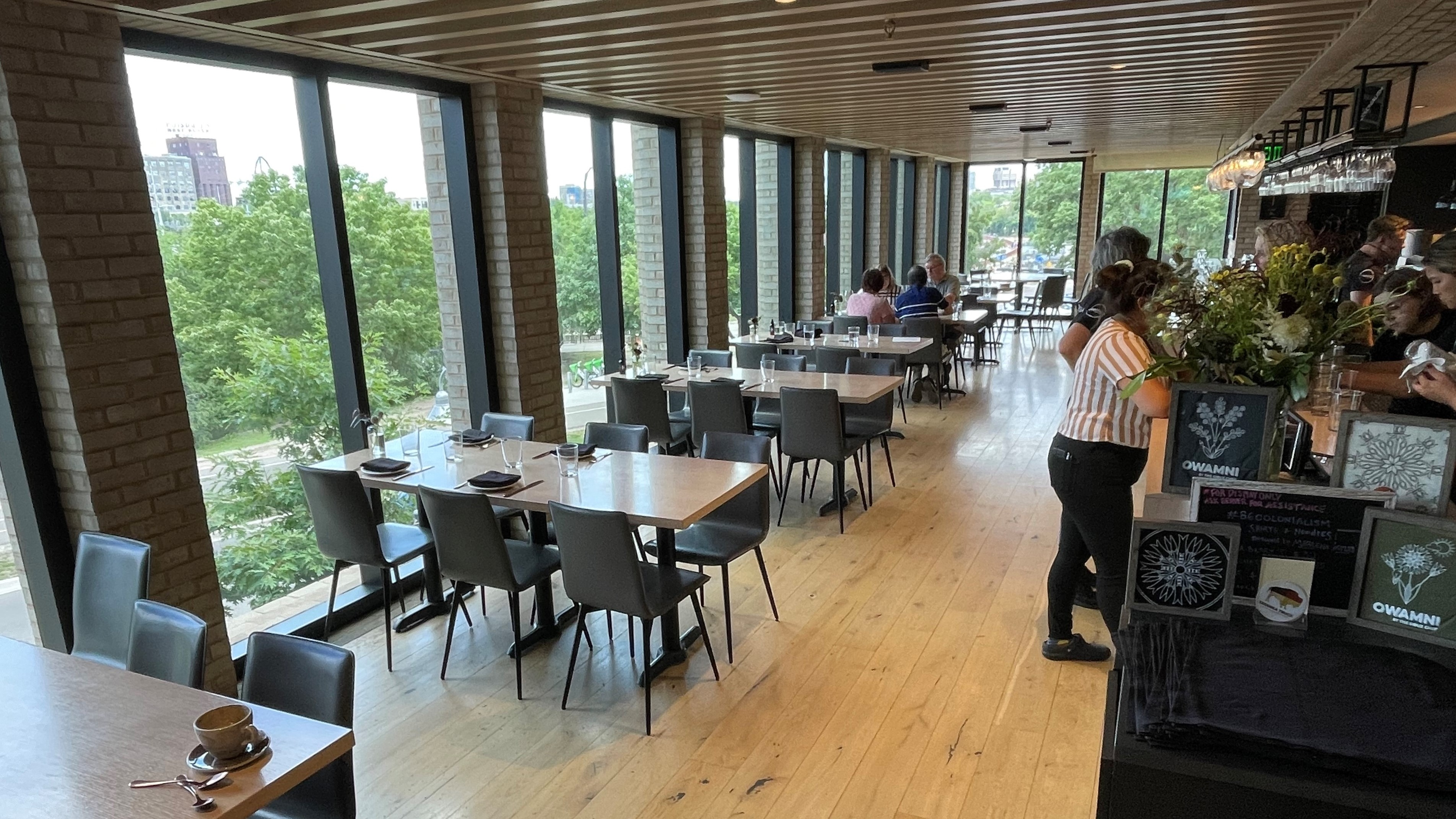
Owamni, Minneapolis

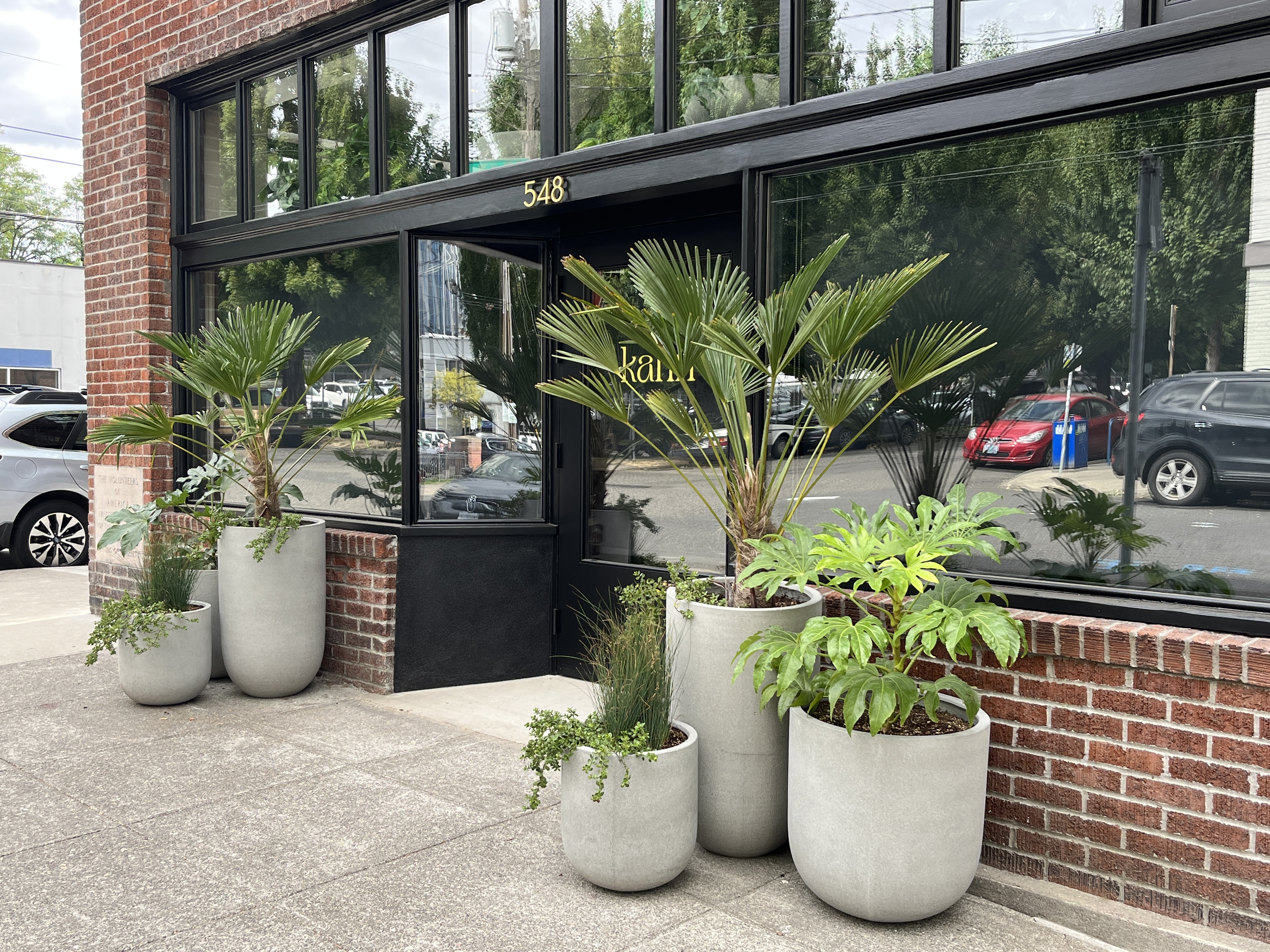
Kann, Portland, Oregon

Recipients of the James Beard Foundation Award for Best New Restaurant include:

- 1995: Nobu, New York City
- 1996: Brasserie Jo, Chicago
- 1997: Rose Pistola, San Francisco
- 1998: Jean-Georges, New York City
- 1999: Babbo, New York City
- 2000: Gary Danko, San Francisco
- 2001: Alain Ducasse, New York City
- 2002: Craft: New York City
- 2003: L'Impero, New York City
- 2004: Bradley Ogden, Las Vegas
- 2005: Per Se, New York City
- 2006: The Modern, New York City
- 2007: L'Atelier de Joël Robuchon, New York City
- 2008: Central Michel Richard, Washington, D.C.
- 2009: Momofuku Ko, New York City
- 2010: Marea, New York City
- 2011: ABC Kitchen, New York City
- 2012: Next, Chicago
- 2013: State Bird Provisions, San Francisco
- 2014: Pêche Seafood Grill, New Orleans
- 2015: Bâtard, New York City
- 2016: Shaya, New Orleans
- 2017: Le Coucou, New York City
- 2018: JuneBaby, Seattle
- 2019: Frenchette, New York City
- 2022: Owamni, Minneapolis
- 2023: Kann, Portland, Oregon
- 2024: Dakar NOLA, New Orleans
- 2025: Bûcheron, Minneapolis
- 2026: Lei, New York City
