= Louis Outhier =

French chef

Louis Outhier (French pronunciation: [lwi utje]) is a French chef best known for Restaurant L'Oasis, a restaurant he ran in La Napoule, a village near Cannes on the French Riviera, from 1954 to 1988.

== Career ==
Outhier trained under Fernand Point at La Pyramide, at the same time as Jean Troisgros and Paul Bocuse.

He is one of the few chefs in history to simultaneously earn three Michelin stars (from 1969 to 1988) and four "toques" in the Gault Millau guide. Working with then Protégé Jean-Georges Vongerichten, he oversaw a number of restaurant openings throughout the world during the 1980s (including London, Singapore, Bangkok, and Osaka) as a consulting executive chef. In America he oversaw Le Marquis de Lafayette in Boston for its owners, Swissotel, directing (along with chef de cuisine Vongerichten) and Stephane Chousineau, Alain DiTomaso, Laurent Poulain 'Diarmuid O'Callaghan, Ken Oringer the menu, staffing, and sourcing of ingredients. He is credited with introducing Asian spices into Nouvelle Cuisine, and for bringing American regionalism into American French restaurants through his use of local fresh ingredients.

After Outhier retired his restaurant was vacant for several years. Chef Stephane Raimbault, a former protégé of Outhier, purchased it in 1999, after which it was awarded two Michelin stars.

Outhier was described, during his career, as thin, passionate, and "dapper". His cuisine attempts to recreate smells and tastes from his childhood, particularly the cooking of his grandmother, who along with his grandfather owned a mill in France.
