= Diana Morgan =

Diana Morgan may refer to:

- Diana Morgan (screenwriter) (1908–1996), British playwright, screenwriter and novelist
- Diana Morgan (actress) (born 1951), American actress and former television news personality
