= Robert Thorne =

Robert Thorne or Thorn may refer to:

- Robert Thorne (explorer), (c.1460-1519) Bristol merchant and explorer
- Robert Thorne (merchant) (1492–1532), Bristol merchant, cartographer and promoter of Arctic exploration
- Robert Thorne (typographer) (1754–1820), English typefounder
- Robert Thorne (cricketer) (1860–1930), English cricketer
- Robert J. Thorne (1875–1955), American businessman
- Robert C. Thorne (1898–1960), American paleontologist
- Robert Folger Thorne (1920–2015), American botanist
- Robert Thorn, a fictional character and the protagonist of the 1976 horror film The Omen
- Robert Thorne (racing driver), member of the automobile racing team K-Pax Racing
- Robert Thorne (lawyer), former CEO of Dualstar
