= Ashley Olsen =

American businesswoman, fashion designer and actress (born 1986)

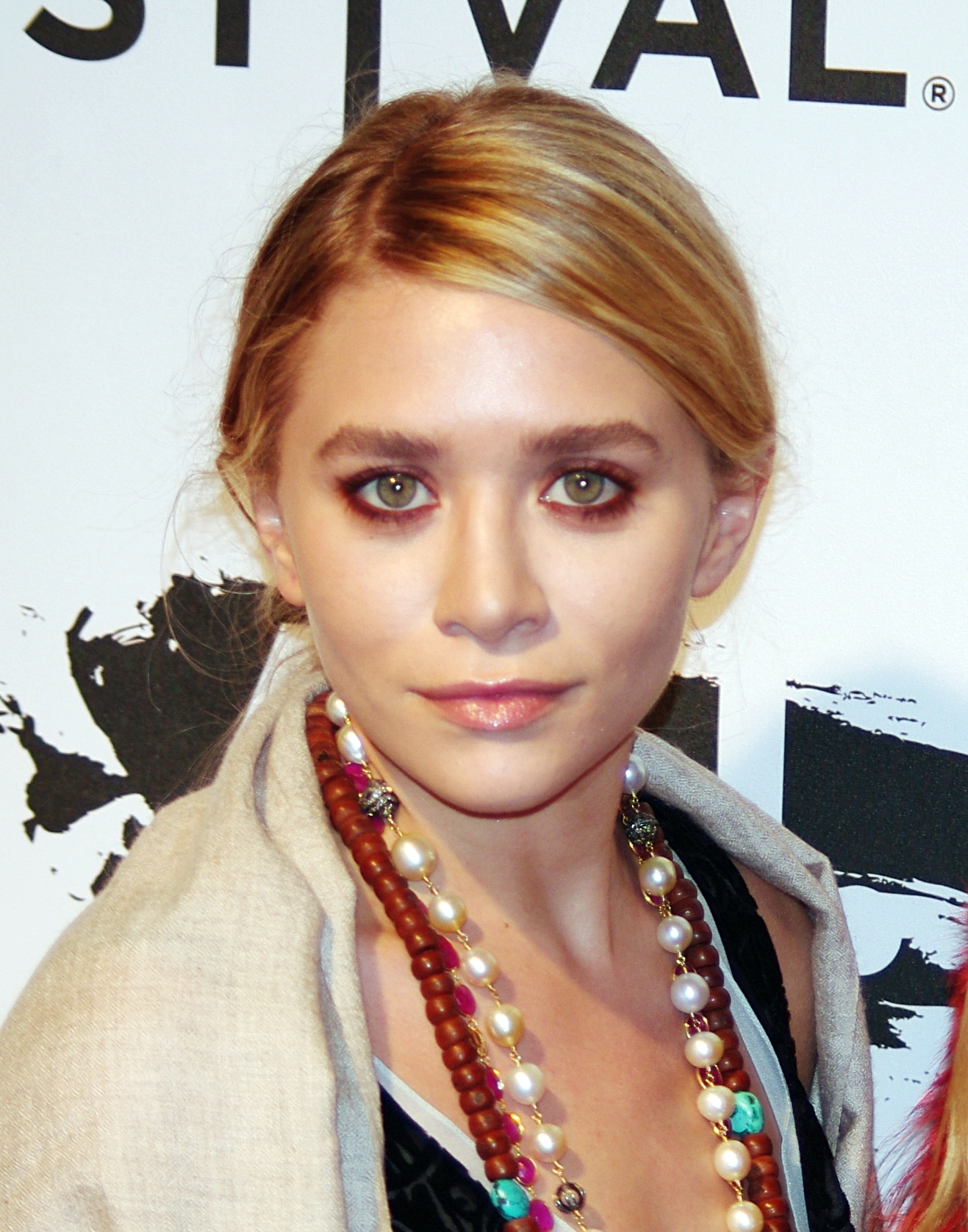
- Olsen in 2011
- Born: June 13, 1986 (age 40); Los Angeles, California, U.S.
- Occupations: Fashion designer; businesswoman; actress
- Years active: 1987–2012 (actress); 2004–present (fashion designer)
- Spouse: Louis Eisner (m. 2022)
- Children: 1
- Relatives: Mary-Kate Olsen (twin sister); Elizabeth Olsen (sister); Eric Eisner (father-in-law)

Ashley Fuller Olsen (born June 13, 1986) is an American businesswoman, fashion designer, and former actress. She began her acting career at the age of nine months, sharing the role of Michelle Tanner with her twin sister Mary-Kate Olsen in the television sitcom Full House (1987–1995). They also starred in numerous films together.

In 1993, the production company Dualstar Entertainment Group was founded, which produced a long string of TV movies and direct-to-video releases featuring the twins; they starred in It Takes Two (1995), Passport to Paris (1999), Our Lips Are Sealed (2000), Winning London (2001), Holiday in the Sun (2001), and in the television series So Little Time (2001–2002). They starred in Getting There (2002), When in Rome (2002), and The Challenge (2003); and made cameos in Charlie's Angels: Full Throttle (2003). The last film Olsen starred in with her twin sister was New York Minute (2004). She continued with her acting career independently, appearing with a few guest-star roles in films and in a music video.

In March 2012, Mary-Kate and Ashley officially indicated their intention to retire as actresses in order to focus on their careers in the fashion industry. The twins co-founded luxury fashion brand The Row, lifestyle brand Elizabeth and James, and more affordable fashion lines Olsenboye and StyleMint. They co-authored a book, Influence, featuring interviews with fashion designers that have inspired their fashion lines. The twins are also members of the Council of Fashion Designers of America.

== Early life and education ==
Ashley Fuller Olsen and her twin sister, Mary-Kate Olsen, were born on June 13, 1986, in Sherman Oaks, California. Ashley is two minutes older than Mary-Kate. She is the daughter of Jarnette "Jarnie" Olsen (née Jones; born 1954), a personal manager, and David "Dave" Olsen, a real estate developer and mortgage banker. Along with Mary-Kate, they have an older brother and a younger sister, actress Elizabeth, and younger half-siblings from their father's second marriage. Olsen's parents divorced in 1996.

Olsen attended the Campbell Hall School in Los Angeles. After graduating from Campbell Hall in 2004, she and Mary-Kate went on to attend New York University's Gallatin School of Individualized Study.

== Acting career ==
=== Career beginnings ===
She began her acting career at the age of six months when she and Mary-Kate were hired to share the role of Michelle Tanner on the popular television sitcom Full House (1987–1995).

She starred alongside Mary-Kate in the films To Grandmother's House We Go (1992), Double, Double, Toil and Trouble (1993), How the West Was Fun (1994), It Takes Two (1995), Billboard Dad (1998) and the television series, Two of a Kind (1998–1999).

=== Dualstar ===
In the 1990s, associates of Olsen and her twin sister, recognizing their marketing potential, built a production company around them called Dualstar Entertainment Group, which produced a long string of successful TV movies and direct-to-video releases featuring the girls. They starred in Passport to Paris (1999), Switching Goals (1999), Our Lips Are Sealed (2000), Winning London (2001), Holiday in the Sun (2001) and the television series, So Little Time (2001–2002).

She and her twin sister became household names and popular figures in the preteen market during the late 1990s and early 2000s, with their likeness seen in clothes, books, fragrances, magazines, movies, and posters, among others. There were fashion dolls of her made by Mattel from 2000 to 2005. They also starred in the films Getting There (2002), When in Rome (2002), The Challenge (2003) and made cameos in Charlie's Angels: Full Throttle (2003). In 2004, the sisters appeared in their theatrical light-hearted romantic comedy film, New York Minute. It would be their last film together, as well as Ashley's last acting role. Mary-Kate continued with her acting career independently, appearing in a few films and shows, with her final acting project being the 2011 movie Beastly.

In 2004, upon the twins' 18th birthday, they became co-presidents of their company Dualstar (created in 1993 following the success of Full House), the brand currently selling in over 3,000 stores in the United States and 5,300 stores worldwide.

=== Retirement ===
In 2004, Olsen stepped away from full-time acting, though she made minor appearances in the films The Jerk Theory (2009) and I'm Still Here (2010), as well as the 2013 music video for "City of Angels" by Thirty Seconds to Mars.

In 2007, when the Olsen twins were 21, they said that if they got involved in movies together again it would be as producers. In 2009, Olsen contemplated returning to acting and said, "Never say never." In March 2012, the Olsen twins indicated their interest to retire as actresses in order to focus on their careers in fashion. They discussed wanting to open a store as one of their future fashion-based endeavors.

In 2015, it was announced that John Stamos had signed on with Netflix to produce and co-star in Fuller House, a spin-off of Full House that would reunite the original cast members. In May of that year, Mary-Kate and Ashley announced that they would not reprise their role as Michelle Tanner; however, two months later in July, according to Netflix's Ted Sarandos, the Olsen twins were "teetering" on an agreement to join the series. The twins eventually declined to join the cast of Fuller House, with Ashley saying she would not feel comfortable in front of the camera after a 12-year absence from acting and Mary-Kate saying the timing was bad. Nickelodeon acquired the rights to Mary-Kate and Ashley's video library in 2015.

=== Net worth and influence ===
She and her sister were jointly ranked number three on the VH1 program 100 Greatest Child Stars. Ashley and her twin Mary-Kate's success has been marked by their inclusion on every Forbes The Celebrity 100 list since 2002. In 2007, Forbes ranked the twins as the eleventh-richest women in entertainment, with an estimated combined net worth of $100 million. Forbes had the twins on their 30 Under 30: All-Star Alumni list in 2017. As of 2024, she and Mary-Kate have an estimated combined net worth of US$500 million.

== Fashion career ==
=== Career beginnings ===
Following a high volume of public interest in their fashion choices, Mary-Kate and Ashley collaborated on a series of fashion lines available to the public. They released clothing in Wal-Mart stores across the US for girls ages 4 to 14, as well as a beauty line called Mary-Kate and Ashley: Real Fashion for Real Girls.

In 2004, they made news by signing a pledge to allow all the workers that sew their line of clothing in Bangladesh full maternity leave. The National Labor Committee, which organized the pledge, later praised the twins for their commitment to worker rights.

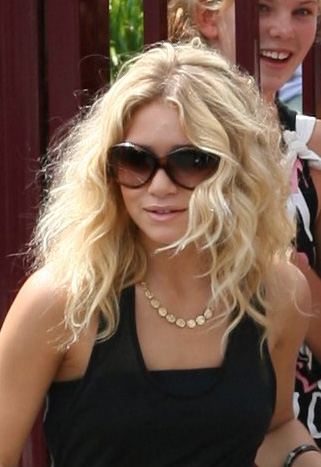
Olsen at Luna Park Sydney in Australia in 2006

=== Business and philanthropy ===
The idea for The Row started as a personal project in 2005 when Olsen challenged herself to create a perfect T-shirt. She tested the design on a variety of women of all body shapes and ages in an attempt to find a "commonality in fit and attitude." By 2006, the sisters had created a 7-piece collection that included the T-shirt, a pair of cotton sateen leggings, and a cashmere wool tank dress. Barneys New York bought the entire first collection. The brand has expanded to include ready-to-wear, resort, handbags, sunglasses, and shoes. That same year, they were selected as the faces of the upscale fashion line Badgley Mischka.

In 2008, Mary-Kate and Ashley published Influence, a book featuring interviews with fashion designers that have inspired their fashion lines.

In 2007, the Olsens released a fashion line called Elizabeth and James. The brand was named after their younger sister, actress Elizabeth Olsen, and older brother, writer James "Trent" Olsen. In 2009, Mary-Kate and Ashley announced that their new women's retail line, Olsenboye, would release for JCPenney. Olsenboye would be much cheaper than The Row, with all products under US$50. It debuted on November 6, 2009, in select stores and online, and launched nationwide in Spring of 2010. The twins designed a limited edition Olsenboye change purse in August 2011 to raise money for Pennies From Heaven, an organization that donates to after-school programs. In July 2011, they founded StyleMint, another retail line, in partnership with BeachMint. That same year, the sisters collaborated with TOMS Shoes to design footwear for children without shoes in Honduras. The sisters traveled to the country together, fitting feet and socializing with the children there. In early 2013, Elizabeth and James launched a perfume line, headed by two fragrances called Nirvana White and Nirvana Black. In 2019, the Elizabeth and James line became exclusively available at Kohl's stores.

In October 2012, the twins won the WSJ magazine Innovator of The Year Award.

Ashley and Mary-Kate have appeared on multiple best-dressed lists, such as Glamour UK's and US Vogue's lists.

== Personal life ==
In 2001, Olsen began dating Columbia University quarterback Matt Kaplan, whom she met while attending high school. The couple split amicably in 2004. In 2008, Olsen began dating actor Justin Bartha. Throughout their relationship, which ended amicably in 2011, they were rumored to be engaged. In 2014, Olsen began a relationship with director Bennett Miller. The relationship ended at an unknown date.

In February 2005, Olsen filed a $40 million lawsuit against tabloid magazine National Enquirer for depicting her as being involved in a drug scandal. The tabloid later apologized to Olsen and stated it did not intend to suggest that she was involved in the scandal.

Olsen began a relationship with artist Louis Eisner in October 2017. Eisner is the son of Eric Eisner, former president of The Geffen Company and a philanthropist who founded the Young Eisner Scholars. He is the cousin of former Disney CEO Michael Eisner. They married on December 28, 2022, in Bel Air, Los Angeles. In 2023, Olsen gave birth to a son. The family lives together in New York City.

== Awards and nominations ==
| Year | Association | Category | Nominated work | Result | Ref. |
|---|---|---|---|---|---|
| 1989 | Young Artist Awards | Best Young Actor/Actress – Under Five Years of Age (with Mary-Kate Olsen) | Full House | Won | |
| 1990 | Young Artist Awards | Outstanding Performance by an Actress Under Nine Years of Age (with Mary-Kate Olsen) | Full House | Won | |
| 1992 | Young Artist Awards | Exceptional Performance by a Young Actress Under Ten (with Mary-Kate Olsen) | Full House | Won | |
| 1994 | Young Artist Awards | Best Youth Actress in a TV Mini-Series, M.O.W. or Special (with Mary-Kate Olsen) | Double, Double, Toil and Trouble | Won | |
| 1996 | Young Artist Awards | Best Performance by an Actress Under Ten – Feature Film | It Takes Two | Nominated | |
| 1996 | Kids' Choice Awards | Favorite Movie Actress (with Mary-Kate Olsen) | It Takes Two | Won | |
| 1999 | Kids' Choice Awards | Favorite TV Actress (with Mary-Kate Olsen) | Two of a Kind | Won | |
| 2004 | Teen Choice Awards | Choice Movie Blush (with Mary-Kate Olsen) | New York Minute | Nominated | |
| 2012 | Council of Fashion Designers of America | Womenswear Designer of the Year (with Mary-Kate Olsen) | The Row | Won | |
| 2012 | The Wall Street Journal | Innovator of the Year: Fashion (with Mary-Kate Olsen) | The Row | Won | |
| 2014 | Council of Fashion Designers of America | Accessories Designer of the Year (with Mary-Kate Olsen) | The Row | Won | |
| 2015 | Council of Fashion Designers of America | Accessories Designer of the Year (with Mary-Kate Olsen) | The Row | Nominated | |
| 2015 | Council of Fashion Designers of America | Womenswear Designer of the Year (with Mary-Kate Olsen) | The Row | Won | |
| 2016 | Council of Fashion Designers of America | Accessories Designer of the Year (with Mary-Kate Olsen) | The Row | Nominated | |
| 2016 | Council of Fashion Designers of America | Womenswear Designer of the Year (with Mary-Kate Olsen) | The Row | Nominated | |
| 2017 | Council of Fashion Designers of America | Accessories Designer of the Year (with Mary-Kate Olsen) | The Row | Nominated | |
| 2017 | Council of Fashion Designers of America | Womenswear Designer of the Year (with Mary-Kate Olsen) | The Row | Nominated | |
| 2018 | Council of Fashion Designers of America | Accessories Designer of the Year (with Mary-Kate Olsen) | The Row | Won | |
| 2018 | Council of Fashion Designers of America | Womenswear Designer of the Year (with Mary-Kate Olsen) | The Row | Nominated | |
| 2019 | Council of Fashion Designers of America | Accessories Designer of the Year (with Mary-Kate Olsen) | The Row | Won | |
