= Mary-Kate Olsen =

American businesswoman, fashion designer and actress (born 1986)

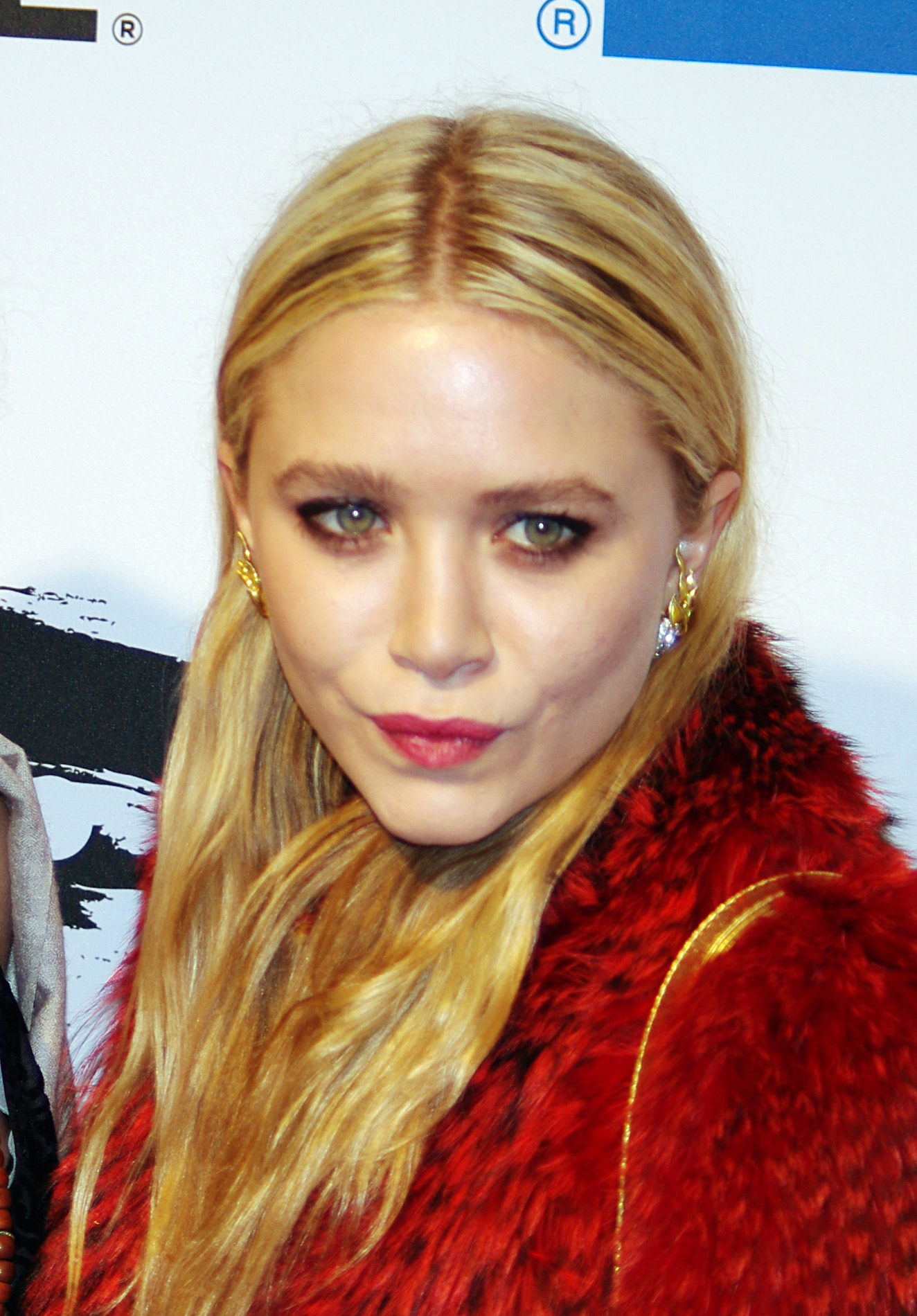
- Olsen in 2011
- Born: June 13, 1986 (age 40); Los Angeles, California, U.S.
- Occupations: Fashion designer; businesswoman; equestrian; actress
- Years active: 1987–2012 (actress); 2004–present (fashion designer)
- Spouse: Olivier Sarkozy (m. 2015; div. 2021)
- Relatives: Ashley Olsen (twin sister); Elizabeth Olsen (sister)

Mary-Kate Olsen (born June 13, 1986) is an American businesswoman, fashion designer, equestrian, and former actress. Her acting career began at the age of nine months, sharing the role of Michelle Tanner with her twin sister Ashley Olsen in the television sitcom Full House (1987–1995). They also starred in numerous films together.

In 1993, the production company Dualstar Entertainment Group was founded, which produced a long string of television films and direct-to-video releases featuring the twins; they starred in It Takes Two (1995), Passport to Paris (1999), Our Lips Are Sealed (2000), Winning London (2001), Holiday in the Sun (2001) and in the television series, So Little Time (2001–2002), for which Olsen was nominated for a Daytime Emmy Award for Outstanding Performer in Children's Programming. They starred in Getting There (2002), When in Rome (2002), The Challenge (2003) and made cameos in Charlie's Angels: Full Throttle (2003). The last film Olsen starred in with her twin sister was New York Minute (2004). She continued with her acting career independently, appearing with a few guest-star roles in films and television shows, with her last film being Beastly (2011).

In March 2012, Mary-Kate and Ashley officially indicated their intention to retire as actresses in order to focus on their careers in the fashion industry. The twins co-founded luxury fashion brand The Row, lifestyle brand Elizabeth and James, and more affordable fashion lines Olsenboye and StyleMint. They co-authored a book, Influence, featuring interviews with fashion designers that have inspired their fashion lines. The twins are also members of the Council of Fashion Designers of America.

== Early life and education ==
Mary-Kate Olsen was born on June 13, 1986, in Sherman Oaks, California. She is the daughter of Jarnette "Jarnie" (née Jones; born 1954), a personal manager, and David "Dave" Olsen, a real estate developer and mortgage banker. She is two minutes younger than her twin sister Ashley. She has an older brother and a younger sister (actress Elizabeth Olsen), and two half-siblings from her father's second marriage. Olsen's parents divorced in 1996.

Olsen attended the Campbell Hall School in Los Angeles. After graduating from Campbell Hall in 2004, Olsen and her twin sister went on to attend the Gallatin School of Individualized Study at New York University.

== Acting career ==
=== Career beginnings ===
Olsen began her acting career at the age of six months old when she and Ashley were hired to share the role of Michelle Tanner on the popular television sitcom Full House (1987–1995). She starred alongside her twin sister in the films, To Grandmother's House We Go (1992), Double, Double, Toil and Trouble (1993), How the West Was Fun (1994), It Takes Two (1995), Billboard Dad (1998) and in the television series, Two of a Kind (1998–1999). In 1997, the Olsen twins guest starred in an episode of Sister, Sister, which starred twin actresses Tia Mowry and Tamera Mowry.

=== Dualstar ===
In 1993, following Mary-Kate and Ashley's success on Full House, a limited liability company, Dualstar Entertainment Group was created to produce Mary-Kate and Ashley-branded products. It produced a successful long string of TV movies and direct-to-video releases featuring the girls. They starred in Passport to Paris (1999), Switching Goals (1999), Our Lips Are Sealed (2000), Winning London (2001), Holiday in the Sun (2001) and in the television series, So Little Time (2001–2002).

They became household names and popular figures in the preteen market during the late 1990s and early 2000s, with Mary-Kate's likeness seen in clothes, books, fragrances, magazines, movies, and posters, among others. There were fashion dolls of her made by Mattel from 2000 to 2005. They also starred in the films Getting There (2002), When in Rome (2002), The Challenge (2003) and made cameos in Charlie's Angels: Full Throttle (2003). In 2004, the twins appeared in their final and light-hearted romantic comedy film, New York Minute.

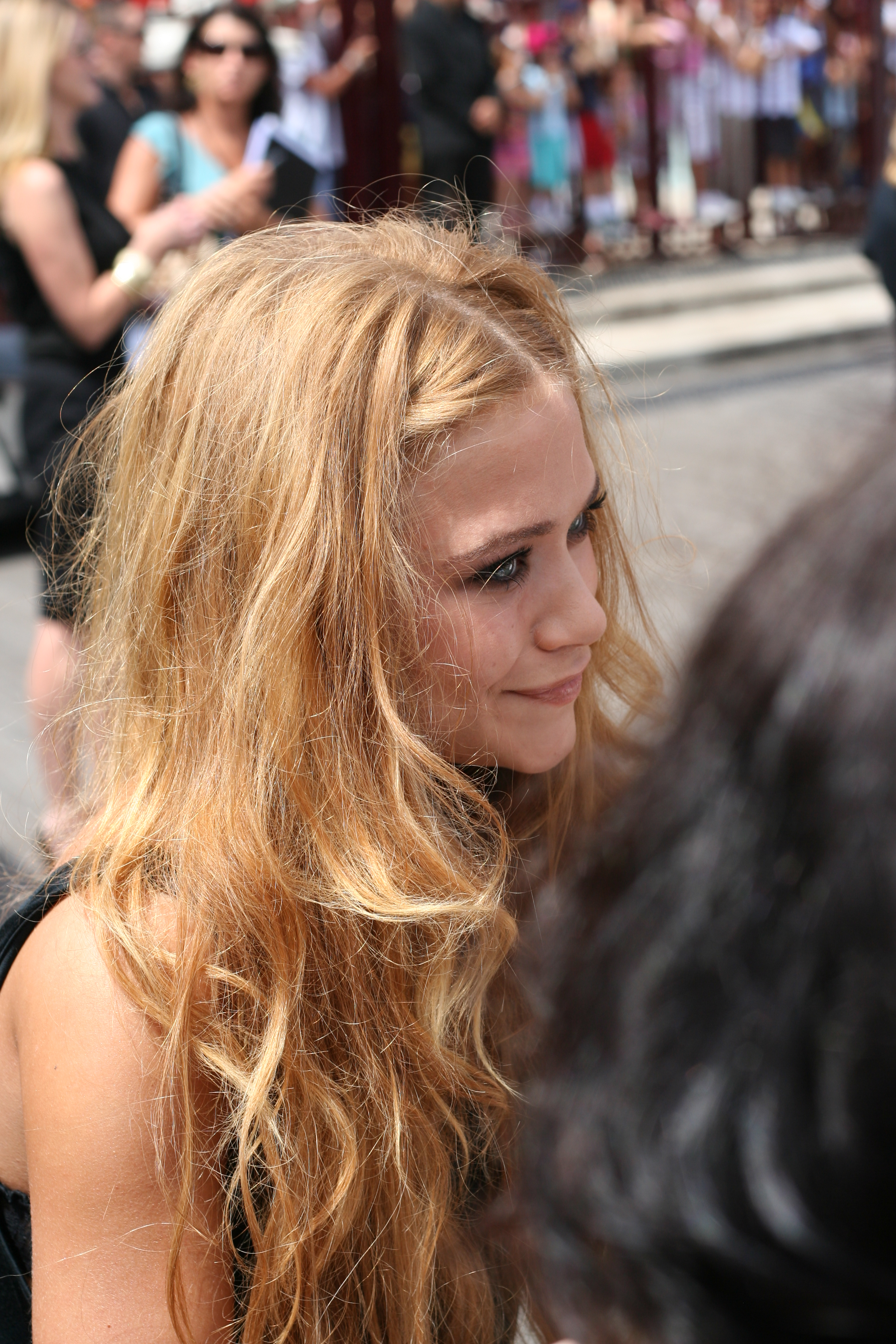
Mary-Kate Olsen in Australia in 2006

That same year upon their 18th birthday, both Mary-Kate and Ashley took control of Dualstar, becoming joint-CEOs and presidents of the company, which at the time had its merchandise being carried in over 3,000 stores in America and 5,300 stores worldwide.

These ventures, combined with an array of licensing deals for their names and likenesses, made Olsen wealthy at a young age. In 2004, Olsen's and her twin sister’s wealth was estimated at $137 million each.

=== Retirement ===
Olsen's first solo acting appearance was in the movie Factory Girl (2006). Her one short scene was ultimately cut from theatrical release, but was included on the film's Unrated version on DVD and Blu-ray.

In 2007, she had a recurring role on the television show, Weeds, and the twins said that if they became involved in movies together again, it would be as producers.

In 2008, Olsen made a guest appearance on the ABC comedy Samantha Who? as a self-destructive girl that Samantha tries to help. That same year, she also appeared in the film The Wackness. In 2011, Olsen appeared in the motion picture adaption of the Alex Flinn novel Beastly, which was her final acting project.

In March 2012, both Mary-Kate and Ashley indicated their interest to retire as actresses in order to focus on their careers in fashion. They discussed wanting to open a store as one of their future fashion-based endeavors.

In 2015, it was announced that John Stamos signed on with Netflix to produce and co-star in Fuller House, a spin-off of Full House that would reunite the original cast members for a 13-episode series. However, in May of that year, Mary-Kate and Ashley announced that they would not reprise their role as Michelle Tanner. A month prior to the announcement, Nickelodeon acquired the rights to the twins' video library.

=== Net worth and influence ===
In 2007, Forbes ranked the twins jointly as the eleventh-richest women in entertainment, with an estimated combined net worth of $100 million.

== Fashion career ==
=== Career beginnings ===
Following a high volume of public interest in their fashion choices, the Olsen twins began work in collaboration on a string of fashion lines available to the public. Starting as young girls, they started a clothing line in Wal-Mart stores across America for girls ages 4 to 14 as well as a beauty line called "Mary-Kate and Ashley: Real fashion for real girls".

In 2004, they made news by signing a pledge to allow all the workers that sew their line of clothing in Bangladesh full maternity leave. The National Labor Committee, which organized the pledge, later praised the twins for their commitment to worker rights.

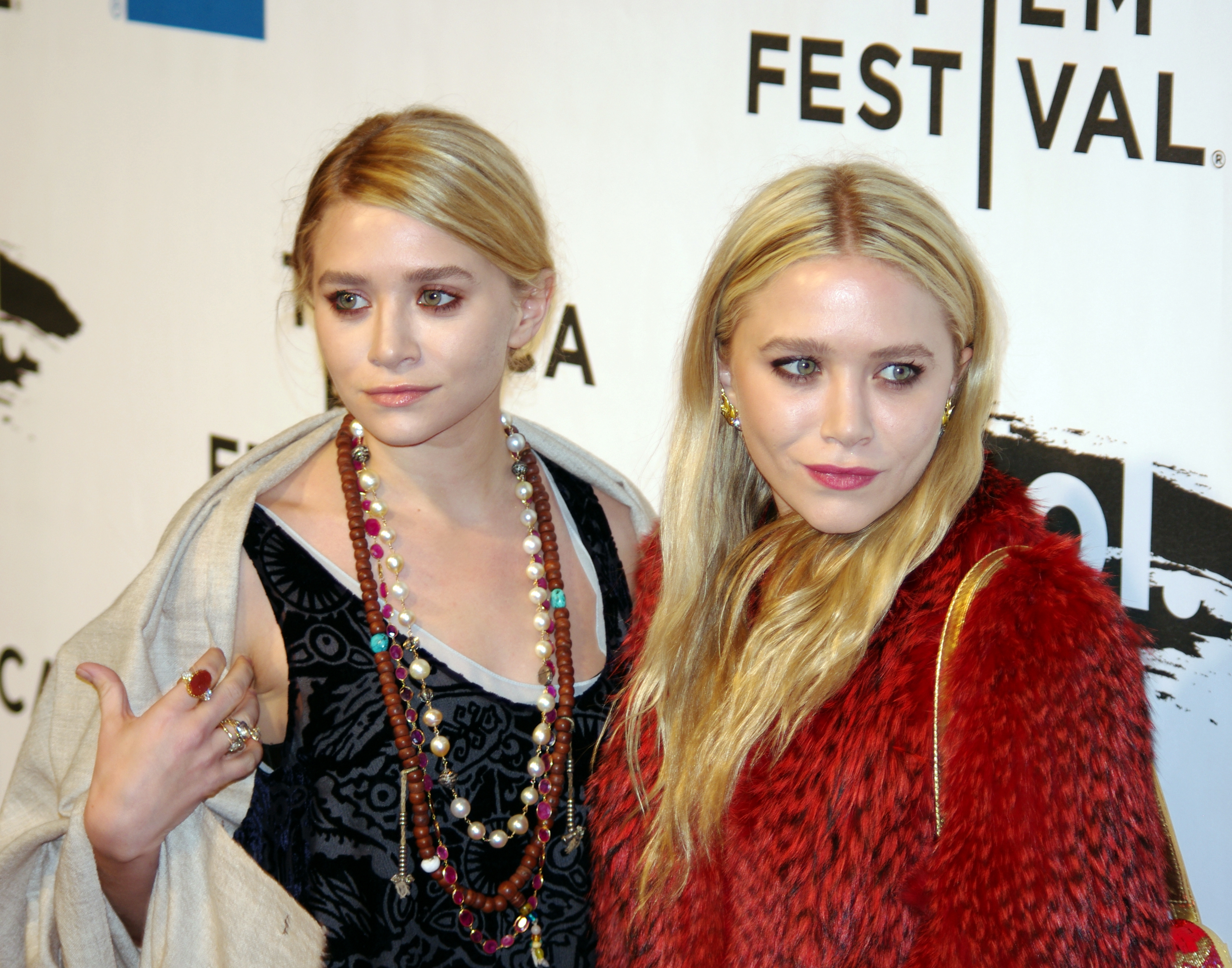
Olsen (right) and her twin sister Ashley Olsen in 2011

=== Business ===
As adults, the Olsen twins have devoted much of their attention to the world of fashion. They head a designer fashion label, The Row, as well as "Elizabeth and James", "Olsenboye", and "StyleMint" retail collections. The idea for The Row started as a personal project in 2005 when Ashley challenged herself to create a perfect T-shirt. She tested the design on a variety of women of all body shapes and ages in an attempt to find a "commonality in fit and attitude." In 2013, they released an Elizabeth and James perfume.

In 2006, Mary-Kate and Ashley were tapped as the faces of the upscale fashion line Badgley Mischka. In 2008, they co-authored Influence, a book featuring interviews with fashion designers that have inspired the twins' fashion lines.

In 2011, Mary-Kate and Ashley collaborated with TOMS Shoes to design footwear for kids without shoes in more than 20 countries worldwide. That same year, the sisters designed an Olsenboye Change Purse and donated the money to "Pennies From Heaven".

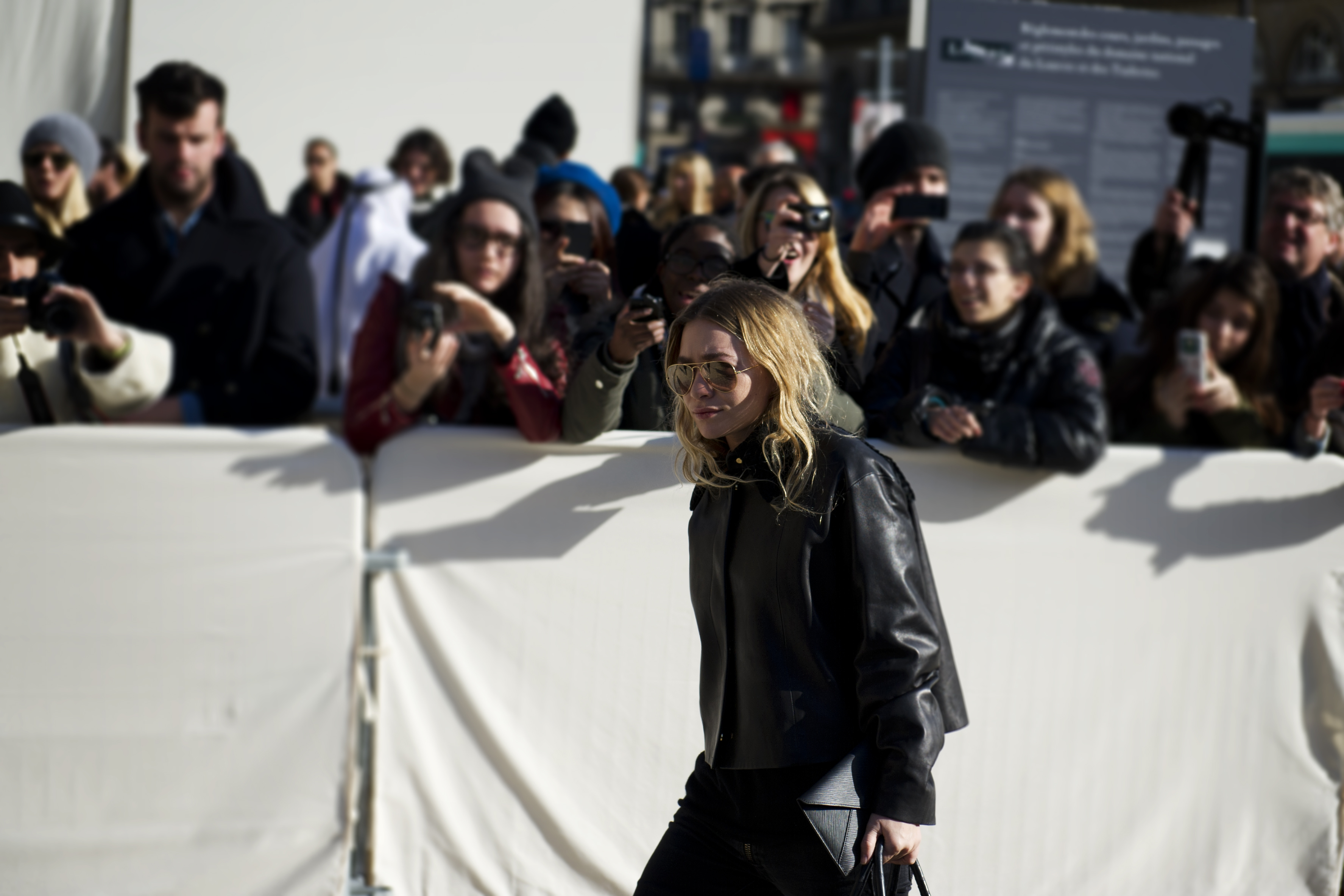
Olsen at the Louis Vuitton Autumn/Winter Fashion Show in 2014

In October 2012, the twins won the WSJ magazine Innovator of The Year Award.

Mary-Kate's controversial fashion choices have often found her on both the best and worst dressed fashion lists, particularly for her decision to wear fur. She and Ashley are members of the Council of Fashion Designers of America, CFDA a not-for-profit trade association of over 450 prominent American fashion and accessory designers. The twins are now the creative directors for Superga.

== Equestrian career ==
Olsen began horse riding in 1992 when she was six years old. During her time at Campbell Hall, she was a member of the school's equestrian team. After moving to New York in 2004 to attend NYU, Olsen temporarily quit riding, but she eventually started again, stating "I came back to the sport because I missed it every day that I wasn't riding. It was the hardest thing to leave and the hardest thing to come back to." In 2013, her horse Marvelous, ridden by James Anderson, won the 38th Hampton Classic Horse Show.

Olsen is a competitive equestrian. She began riding in the Hampton Classic Horse Show in Bridgehampton, New York in 2013. On September 17, 2016, she competed at The American Gold Cup in North Salem, New York. In August–September 2017, she competed at the Hampton Classic Horse Show: on August 29, Olsen and her horse Dunotaire V (born Dunotaire VI) finished in sixth place in the amateur owner jumper (1.20 meter) event; and on September 1, she and Dunotaire V finished in third place in the amateur owner jumper classic event. In September 2017, Olsen and her horse Feu d'Amour won The American Gold Cup. She also has horses named Prem' Dollar Boy and Hertog Van't Merdehof.

In 2018, Olsen and Dunotaire V ranked 7 out of 40 in a category at the Palm Beach Masters in Wellington, Florida. In May 2019, Olsen competed at the Longines Global Champions Tour in Madrid, Spain; she and her horse Naomi finished in sixth place in their event, while she and her horse Fatum were disqualified from their event due to an "error of course". On July 12, 2019, Olsen and Fatum won a 1.25m two-phase showjumping class at the Longines Global Champions Tour in Chantilly, France. In September 2021, she competed at the Longines Global Champions Tour in Rome, Italy: on September 16, she and her horse Iowa Van Het Polderhof finished in second place in the 2 Phases Special event; and on September 18, Olsen and Dunotaire V finished in third place in an Against the Clock No Jump Off event.

== Personal life ==
=== Relationships ===
Olsen dated David Katzenberg (son of DreamWorks cofounder Jeffrey Katzenberg), photographer Maxwell Snow, and artist Nate Lowman.

In May 2012, Olsen began a relationship with Olivier Sarközy de Nagy-Bocsa, half-brother of former French president Nicolas Sarkozy. In March 2014, photos were published showing Olsen wearing what appeared to be an engagement ring. Olsen and Sarkozy were married on November 27, 2015, at a private residence in New York City. On April 17, 2020, Olsen filed for divorce from Sarkozy. On May 13, she filed an emergency order to proceed despite delays due to the COVID-19 pandemic; the emergency order was denied a day later. On January 25, 2021, the divorce was finalized.

=== Health issues ===
In 2004, shortly after graduating from high school, Olsen announced she had entered treatment for anorexia nervosa. A Got Milk? advertisement featuring the twins was pulled following the announcement. On November 20, 2007, she was hospitalized for a reported kidney infection.

=== Death of Heath Ledger ===
Olsen was a close friend of actor Heath Ledger. After discovering Ledger dead in his bed on January 22, 2008, his massage therapist called Olsen twice before contacting police. Olsen sent a private security guard to the scene.

Responding to a claim by an anonymous law enforcement official that she would not speak to federal investigators without a promise of legal immunity, Olsen's attorney Michael C. Miller said, "We have provided the government with relevant information including facts in the chronology of events surrounding Mr. Ledger's death and the fact that Ms. Olsen does not know the source of the drugs Mr. Ledger consumed".

== Filmography ==
Film
Year	Title	Role	Notes
2006	Factory Girl	Molly Spence	
2008	The Wackness	Union	
2011	Beastly	Kendra Hilferty	
2013	Scatter My Ashes at Bergdorf's	Herself	Documentary

Television
Year	Title	Role	Notes
2007	Weeds	Tara Lindman	Recurring role (Season 3)
2008	Samantha Who?	Natalie	Episode: "Help!"

== Awards and nominations ==
Year	Association	Category	Nominated work	Result	Ref.
1989	Young Artist Awards	Best Young Actor/Actress – Under Five Years of Age (with Ashley Olsen)	Full House	Won	
1990	Young Artist Awards	Outstanding Performance by an Actress Under Nine Years of Age (with Ashley Olsen)	Full House	Won	
1992	Young Artist Awards	Exceptional Performance by a Young Actress Under Ten (with Ashley Olsen)	Full House	Won	
1994	Young Artist Awards	Best Youth Actress in a TV Mini-Series, M.O.W. or Special (with Ashley Olsen)	Double, Double, Toil and Trouble	Won	
1996	Young Artist Awards	Best Performance by an Actress Under Ten – Feature Film	It Takes Two	Nominated	
1996	Kids' Choice Awards	Favorite Movie Actress (with Ashley Olsen)	It Takes Two	Won	
1999	Kids' Choice Awards	Favorite TV Actress (with Ashley Olsen)	It Takes Two	Won	
2002	Daytime Emmy Awards	Outstanding Performer in a Children's Series	So Little Time	Nominated	
2004	Teen Choice Awards	Choice Movie Blush (with Ashley Olsen)	New York Minute	Nominated	
2012	Wall Street Journal	Innovator of the Year: Fashion (with Ashley Olsen)	The Row	Won	
2012	Council of Fashion Designers of America	Womenswear Designer of the Year (with Ashley Olsen)	The Row	Won	
2014	Council of Fashion Designers of America	Accessories Designer of the Year (with Ashley Olsen)	The Row	Won	
2015	Council of Fashion Designers of America	Accessories Designer of the Year (with Ashley Olsen)	The Row	Nominated	
2015	Council of Fashion Designers of America	Womenswear Designer of the Year (with Ashley Olsen)	The Row	Won	
2016	Council of Fashion Designers of America	Womenswear Designer of the Year (with Ashley Olsen)	The Row	Nominated	
2016	Council of Fashion Designers of America	Accessories Designer of the Year (with Ashley Olsen)	The Row	Nominated	
2017	Council of Fashion Designers of America	Accessories Designer of the Year (with Ashley Olsen)	The Row	Nominated	
2017	Council of Fashion Designers of America	Womenswear Designer of the Year (with Ashley Olsen)	The Row	Nominated	
2018	Council of Fashion Designers of America	Womenswear Designer of the Year (with Ashley Olsen)	The Row	Nominated	
2018	Council of Fashion Designers of America	Accessories Designer of the Year (with Ashley Olsen)	The Row	Won	
2019	Council of Fashion Designers of America	Accessories Designer of the Year (with Ashley Olsen)	The Row	Won	
