= Billboard Dad =

- DVD cover
- Directed by: Alan Metter
- Written by: Maria Jacquemetton
- Produced by: Neil Steinberg
- Starring: Mary-Kate Olsen; Ashley Olsen
- Cinematography: Mauro Fiore
- Edited by: Sharyn L. Ross
- Music by: David Michael Frank
- Production companies: Dualstar Entertainment Group; Tapestry Films
- Distributed by: Warner Home Video
- Release date: November 10, 1998
- Running time: 87 minutes
- Country: United States
- Language: English

Billboard Dad is a 1998 American romantic comedy film directed by Alan Metter starring Mary-Kate and Ashley Olsen. It was produced by Dualstar Entertainment Group and Tapestry Films and released by Warner Home Video on November 10, 1998. It is the first of eight direct-to-video films starring the Olsens produced jointly by Dualstar Entertainment Group and Tapestry Films.

== Plot ==
Set in Los Angeles, California, the film revolves around 12-year-old twin sisters, Emily (a surfer girl) and Tess (a member of the high-diving team), as they try various strategies to get their widower father, Max (a talented artist and sculptor), a girlfriend.

After their first attempts end in failure, Tess and Emily team up with their friend, Cody, to paint an advertisement on a giant billboard situated high above Sunset Boulevard. Many women answer the advertisement through letters and through random chance, Max answers a letter submitted by a woman named Debbie.

Debbie brings along her friend Brooke as a back-up in preparation for the former's date with Max. Brooke and Max coincidentally meet and take a liking to each other and Debbie agrees they should start dating. At first, Tess and Emily don't like Brooke's son, Ryan, a skater punk boy. But when an elaborate scheme by Max's business manager, Nigel, to break up the romantic relationship between Max and Brooke arises, Ryan and the girls put aside their differences in order to foil the break-up plan.

== Cast ==
- Ashley Olsen as Emily Tyler
- Mary-Kate Olsen as Tess Tyler
- Tom Amandes as Maxwell Tyler
- Jessica Tuck as Brooke Anders
- Carl Banks as Nigel
- Ellen Ratner as Debbie
- Sam Saletta as Ryan
- Rafael Rojas III as Cody
- Troian Bellisario as Kristen Bulut
- Angelique Parry as Julianne
- Bailey Luetgert as Brad Thomas
- Vincent Bowman as Buzz Cut
- Debra Christofferson as Autumn
- Lisa Montgomery as Enola Rubenstein
- Twink Caplan as Chelsea Myers
- Diana Morgan as Katherine Buxbaum
- Teresa Caplan as Woman

== Reception ==
The film was rated "Family-Approved" for all ages from the Dove Foundation.
