= New York Minute (film) =

2004 film by Dennie Gordon

- Theatrical release poster
- Directed by: Dennie Gordon
- Screenplay by: Emily Fox; Adam Cooper; Bill Collage
- Story by: Emily Fox
- Produced by: Denise Di Novi; Robert Thorne; Mary-Kate Olsen; Ashley Olsen
- Starring: Mary-Kate Olsen; Ashley Olsen; Andy Richter; Jared Padalecki; Riley Smith; Andrea Martin; Eugene Levy
- Cinematography: Greg Gardiner
- Edited by: Michael Jablow
- Music by: George S. Clinton
- Production companies: Dualstar Productions; Di Novi Pictures
- Distributed by: Warner Bros. Pictures
- Release date: May 7, 2004
- Running time: 91 minutes
- Country: United States
- Language: English
- Budget: $30 million
- Box office: $21.3 million

New York Minute is a 2004 American teen comedy film directed by Dennie Gordon and starring Mary-Kate Olsen, Ashley Olsen, and Eugene Levy, with Andy Richter, Jared Padalecki, Riley Smith, and Andrea Martin in supporting roles. In the film, Mary-Kate and Ashley portray twins with opposing personalities who have a series of adventures around New York City. The film reunited the Olsens with Bob Saget (in a non-speaking cameo) for the first time since they all starred together on the television series Full House.

New York Minute was released in the United States on May 7, 2004 by Warner Bros. Pictures, marking the Olsen twins' second and final theatrical film release after It Takes Two, after years of starring in direct-to-video and television film productions. Consequently, it was the last film featuring both Mary-Kate and Ashley, as the former went on to appear in her own acting projects while the latter quit acting shortly after the film's release. This was also the last film to be produced by the Olsens' Dualstar Entertainment company before it went into dormancy.

The film received generally negative reviews from critics and was a box office bomb as it grossed $21.3 million against a $30 million budget; however, several publications have since re-evaluated the film as a cult classic in the years after its initial release.

== Plot ==
Seventeen-year-old twin sisters Jane, an uptight overachiever, and Roxy Ryan, a rebellious, aspiring rock star, are polar opposites who have not seen eye to eye since their mother's death.

The twins live with their widower father in Syosset on Long Island. The two journey into NYC so Jane can deliver a speech for a prestigious college scholarship for Oxford and Roxy can hand her band's demo tape to Simple Plan, who are in town shooting a music video.

Jane and Roxy board the train into the city but are thrown off after Roxy is found without a ticket. Jane flirts with Jim, and a chip device is mistakenly planted in Roxy's bag. Bennie Bang, the man behind the device, offers Roxy a limousine ride, and she accepts, dragging Jane along. He locks them inside, but they escape through the sunroof into the subway. Meanwhile, overzealous truant officer Max Lomax, is on the hunt for Roxy.

Jane realizes she has left her day planner in the limo, which has money and the prompt cards for her speech. She and Roxy break into an upscale hotel room to freshen up, where they receive a phone call from Bennie who offers to exchange the chip for the day planner. They meet Trey, the son of a powerful senator staying at the hotel, and his mother's dog Reinaldo, who swallows the chip.

Roxy heads to the Simple Plan video shoot, Max on her tail, while Jane meets Bennie for the exchange. When he learns the dog has swallowed the chip, he tries to attack Jane and kidnaps Trey, while Jane escapes to find Roxy. Jane, Roxy, and Reinaldo end up in the underground sewer, with Jane's speech due to begin in less than two hours.

The girls make their way to a Harlem beauty salon, where they receive makeovers, although Max hunts them down and they escape in a cab and later argue. Jane feels that Roxy has never been there for her and never takes life seriously, leaving Jane in charge after their mother's death. Conversely, Roxy believes Jane does not need to take control of everything and feels she is being pushed away.

Jane goes to meet Bennie, who takes her to his mother's, the head of a DVD and CD pirating operation. Roxy finds Bennie's limo, retrieves Jane's day planner, and frees Trey, who is locked in the trunk. They both rush to the building where Jane is to give her speech. When they arrive, Roxy poses as Jane to give the speech, but drops the prompt cards so has to improvise.

Jane turns up and explains why she was not there. Suddenly, Max and Bennie arrive, Bennie's illegal doings are exposed, and he is arrested by Max. As Jane leaves with Roxy, one of the judges catches up to Jane after finding her prompt cards and gives her a college scholarship to Oxford, because she "didn't just want to win, she absolutely refused to fail."

Months later, Roxy is in the studio recording with the band, watched by Jane, Trey, Jim, and even Max (now an official police officer) as they celebrate all together.

== Cast ==
- Ashley Olsen as Jane Ryan
- Mary-Kate Olsen as Roxy Ryan
- Jared Padalecki as Trey Lipton
- Riley Smith as James "Jim", the bike messenger
- Eugene Levy as Maximillion "Max" Lomax
- Andy Richter as Benjamin "Bennie" Bang
- Drew Pinsky as Dr. Ryan
- Darrell Hammond as Hudson McGill
- Andrea Martin as Senator Anne Lipton
- Alannah Ong as Ma Bang
- Mary Bond Davis as Big Shirl
- Bob Saget as himself
- Jack Osbourne as Justin
- Joey Klein as truant at pool
- Neil Crone as Officer Strauss
- Garen Boyajian as Manju
- Jonathan Wilson as train conductor
- Boyd Banks as ticket window guy #1
- Silver Kim as Asian guy with chip
- H. Jon Benjamin as I Love NY Vendor
- Gala and Krissy as Reinaldo
  - Frank Welker performs the vocal effects for Reinaldo
- Simple Plan as themselves
  - Pierre Bouvier as himself
  - Chuck Comeau as himself
  - Jeff Stinco as himself
  - Sébastien Lefebvre as himself
  - David Desrosiers as himself
- Naked Cowboy as himself (uncredited)
- Thomas Gleadow as himself (uncredited)

== Reception ==
=== Critical response ===
On review aggregator website Rotten Tomatoes, the film holds an approval rating of 11% based on 119 reviews, with an average rating of 3.8/10. The site's critics' consensus reads: "Feels more like a calculated product designed to expand the Olsens' brand than an actual movie. Also, it contains ethnic stereotyping and sexual innuendo." At Metacritic, the film has a weighted average score of 33 out of 100, based on 32 critics, indicating "generally unfavorable reviews". Audiences polled by CinemaScore gave the film an average grade of "B" on an A+ to F scale.

Roger Ebert and Richard Roeper gave the film a "two thumbs down" on the television show Ebert & Roeper; in selecting the film as one of the worst of 2004, Ebert remarked that the film "not only should have gone straight to video but should have gone straight through video and kept on going to the end of the universe and never looked back." He added: "New York Minute was obviously generated entirely as a vehicle for the Olsen twins, but what kind of a vehicle has no idea where to go, or what to do when it gets there? This movie should have put on the brakes."

The Olsen twins are not children any longer, yet not quite poised to become adults, and so they're given the props and costumes of 17-year-olds but carefully shielded from the reality. That any 17-year-old girl in America could take seriously the rock band that Roxy worships is beyond contemplation. It doesn't even look like a band to itself.

=== Box office ===
New York Minute earned $5.96 million in its North American opening weekend, finishing in fourth place behind Van Helsing, Mean Girls, and Man on Fire, setting a record-low for a film playing in over 3,000 theatres. The film went on to gross $14.1 million in North America, and $7.2 million internationally, for a worldwide gross of $21.3 million.

=== Accolades ===
Year	Ceremony	Category	Recipients	Result
2004	Teen Choice Awards	Choice Movie: Liar	Eugene Levy	Nominated
2004	Teen Choice Awards	Choice Movie: Blush	Mary-Kate and Ashley Olsen	Nominated
2005	Golden Raspberry Awards	Worst Actress	Mary-Kate and Ashley Olsen	Nominated
2005	Golden Raspberry Awards	Worst Screen Couple	Mary-Kate and Ashley Olsen	Nominated
2005	Stinkers Bad Movie Awards	Worst Actress	Mary-Kate and Ashley Olsen	Nominated
2005	Stinkers Bad Movie Awards	Worst On-Screen Couple	Mary-Kate and Ashley Olsen	Nominated
