= Winning London =

2001 film

- DVD cover
- Directed by: Craig Shapiro
- Written by: Karol Ann Hoffner
- Produced by: Neil Steinberg; Natan Zahavi
- Starring: Mary-Kate and Ashley Olsen
- Cinematography: David Lewis
- Edited by: Sherwood Jones
- Music by: Brahm Wenger
- Production companies: Dualstar Entertainment Group; Tapestry Films
- Distributed by: Warner Home Video
- Release date: March 27, 2001
- Running time: 93 minutes
- Country: United States
- Language: English

Winning London is a 2001 American romantic comedy film directed by Craig Shapiro and starring Mary-Kate and Ashley Olsen. The film was produced by Dualstar Entertainment Group and Tapestry Films and released by Warner Home Video on March 27, 2001.

== Plot ==
Chloe Lawrence is a very driven teenager and the leader of her high school's Model United Nations-team. After performing particularly well in a competition, Chloe's team is selected to attend the International Model United Nations in London, England. But when Randall, one of Chloe's teammates, is unable to attend due to a family obligation, Chloe's twin sister Riley steps in to take his place for the competition (and to get closer to Brian, another of Chloe's team-mates whom Riley happens to have a crush on).

When the group arrives in London, they discover that someone's already representing their usual country: China. Undaunted, they improvise and end up representing the United Kingdom. Plenty of sight-seeing and shopping ensues, during which Chloe falls for James Browning, the son of a wealthy British nobleman named Lord Browning, who's being pressured by his dad to achieve more. As the competition progresses, Chloe's over-competitive nature stalls her budding romance, Riley tries to get closer to Brian, and the team earns both admiration and anger for their unconventional methods. Nevertheless, tribulations are weathered and lessons are learned about sportsmanship, overlooked friends, and enjoying one's youth.

== Cast ==
- Ashley Olsen as Riley Lawrence
- Mary-Kate Olsen as Chloe Lawrence
- Brandon Tyler as Brian
- Jesse Spencer as James Browning
- Rachel Roth as Rachel
- Eric Jungmann as Dylan
- Claire Yarlett as Julia Watson
- Steven Shenbaum as Harry Holmes
- Paul Ridley as Lord Browning
- Stephanie Arellano as Gabriella
- Blythe Matsui as Sakura
- Curtis Anderson as Goofy delegate
- Garikayi Mutambirwa as Niko
- Jeremy Maxwell as Jonathan
- Benton Jennings as Chef
- Jerry Gelb as Bell Captain
- Robert Phelps as Head Judge
- Jarrett Lennon as Randall
- Richard Alan Brown as Kid
- Leo Dolan, Ken Flori as Cockney cabbies
