= Passport to Paris =

- DVD cover
- Directed by: Alan Metter
- Written by: Elizabeth Kruger; Craig Shapiro
- Produced by: Neil Steinberg; Megan Ring
- Starring: Mary-Kate and Ashley Olsen
- Cinematography: Steven Wacks
- Edited by: Sherwood Jones
- Music by: Christopher Brady
- Production companies: Dualstar Entertainment Group; Tapestry Films
- Distributed by: WarnerVision Entertainment; Warner Home Video
- Release date: November 9, 1999
- Running time: 87 minutes
- Countries: United States; France
- Language: English

Passport to Paris is a 1999 American romantic comedy film starring Mary-Kate and Ashley Olsen, who also serve as the film's executive producers. It was produced by Dualstar Entertainment Group and Tapestry Films and released by WarnerVision Entertainment and Warner Home Video on November 9, 1999.

== Plot ==
13-year-old twin sisters Melanie and Allyson Porter have only one concern: boys. Desperate for them to broaden their horizons and see the world, their parents send them to Paris, France to spend spring break with their estranged grandfather, Edward, who's the American Ambassador to France.

Expecting a fun time with their grandfather, they instead end up living day-to-day via a mundane itinerary with his no-nonsense assistant, Jeremy Bluff, since Edward's always too busy with his ambassadorial duties to spend time with them. They also learn some harsh rules while staying at his swanky mansion, which includes: no loud music, no jumping on the bed, and having to be dressed appropriately for dinner every night without being a minute late.

While out for lunch one afternoon, the girls meet and befriend Brigitte, a beautiful French fashion model, who agrees to show them the great sights of Paris. They also meet two charming teenage French boys, Jean and Michel (who become infatuated with them and give them roses), and find various ways to ditch Jeremy so that they can spend time cruising around the city on mopeds with the boys. One afternoon, the twins end up in police custody, along with Jean and Michel, for trespassing on private property. To their dismay, the girls are forbidden by Grandpa Edward to see the boys again.

At dinner one night, the girls challenge the French Foreign Minister, Monsieur De Beauvoir, and manage to convince him to accept an important proposal that was established by their grandfather, concerning clean drinking water for the Embassy. This puts Melanie and Allyson back in Grandpa Edward's good graces, and he allows them to once again see Jean and Michel, even allowing all four of them to attend a dance together where they have their first kisses.

When the time comes for the girls to return home, Grandpa Edward decides to take a much-needed break from his ambassadorial duties and accompany them—the intention being to spend time with his family (whom he hasn't seen for a long time) back in the United States.

== Cast ==
- Ashley Olsen as Allyson Porter
- Mary-Kate Olsen as Melanie Porter
- Peter White as Grandpa Edward
- Matt Winston as Jeremy Bluff
- Yvonne Sciò as Brigitte
- Ethan Peck as Michel
- Brocker Way as Jean
- Doran Clark as Barbara Porter
- Matt McCoy as Jack Porter
- François Giroday as Henri
- Jon Menick as François
- Robert Martin Robinson as Monsieur De Beauvoir
- Laura Jacobson as Madame De Beauvoir
- Logan Robbins as Kyle
- Matt Freund as Shane
- Sian Bentson as Darlene
- Katrina Darrell as Katie/Helene
- Michael Immel as Mr. Harper
- Kevin Fabian as Pizza Hut Delivery Guy
- Stéphane Dausse as Snooty Bistro Waiter
- Ariane Seguillon as Cafe Waitress
- Richard Chevallier as French Police Officer
- Isabelle Patay as Museum Tour Guide
