= Robert Thorne (lawyer) =

American attorney and businessman

- Born: Circa 1955
- Education: UC Berkeley
- Title: CEO of Dualstar (1993-2005)

Robert Thorne is an entertainment and licensing lawyer, formerly known for being the manager of Mary-Kate and Ashley Olsen, in addition to the CEO of their company Dualstar Entertainment. Thorne founded Dualstar in 1993 with the Olsens and turned it into a billion dollar company by the time he left in 2005. Robert Thorne is Founder and CEO of The Robert Thorne Company, former President of the Century City Bar Association and a former law partner at Loeb & Loeb in Century City, California.

== Career ==
Thorne was admitted to the State Bar of California on December 16, 1980, and began his career as an entertainment lawyer. From 1987 to 1990, Thorne served as the chair of the Entertainment Law Section of the Century City Bar Association.

In February 1990, Thorne was made a partner at the law firm Loeb & Loeb in California.

Robert Thorne, was hired by Dave Olsen, Mary-Kate and Ashley's father, in 1990. At the time, they were only four years old, and Thorne was retained to help renegotiate their contracts for Full House. The legal advice morphed, and Thorne became the managers of Mary-Kate and Ashley Olsen when they were only 4 1/2-years old.

In March 1992, Thorne was named president-elect of Century City Bar Association in Los Angeles, after serving as the secretary for a number of years.

In 1993, on behalf of Mary-Kate and Ashley, Thorne founded the company Dualstar Entertainment.

As Executive Producer of So Little Time, Thorne had an office located on the Universal Studios Lot in Universal City, California.

In a 2001 interview, Thorne said, "Even though they're 14 years old, I work for them." Of the Dualstar success, he went on to say, "It started as a fiction, to be candid, that it was Mary-Kate and Ashley's deal, this brand, this whole thing. They were involved more like: 'Is this O.K.?' 'Sure.' Now they say we created a monster, but I don't think so. I think we created two professional executives."

On March 6, 2002, Thorne filed the articles of incorporation for a new business venture entitled Thorne Enterprises, Inc. A month later, on April 9, he filed an amendment updating the name to The Robert Thorne Company, and listing himself as its president and secretary.

In 2004, when the Olsen twins decided to move to New York for college, Thorne as their manager and CEO followed them across the country. He signed a contract for a $3.35 million town house in the complex. In February, he also bought a three-bedroom apartment on the 14th floor, directly below the Olsens' penthouse, for $2.13 million.

After Mary-Kate and Ashley turned 18-years old, they wanted to take on the full leadership position of their production company Dualstar Entertainment. Thorne, who officially had a minority stake in the company, was bought out for an undisclosed amount. "The decision was to respect their desire to take the helm perhaps a few years earlier than I had anticipated," Thorne told Reuters. "But I didn’t want to stand in their way provided that I was taken care of, as I was handsomely." At the time of Thorne's departure from Dualstar, the company was generating a profit of $1.2 billion in sales a year.

The following year, Thorne was secured by Hilary Duff to spearhead her new merchandising venture. In 2007, Thorne was quoted, "I don’t really represent people, I build businesses." Merchandising Hilary Duff happened much more quickly than with the Olsens, establishing the tween-targeted brand "Stuff by Hilary Duff", and the more adult oriented partnership with Elizabeth Arden producing the fragrance With Love... Hilary Duff.

== Personal life ==
=== Education ===
A graduate of UC Berkeley.

Thorne graduated from Hastings College of the Law on May 17, 1980.

=== Family ===
Thorne's kids Griffen and Harrison were both trained by a private tennis coach.

In 2017, Thorne sold his three-story townhouse at One Morton Square in the West Village for $8.24 million.

== Filmography ==
Year	Title	Writer	Producer	Network	Notes
1993	Our First Video	No	Executive	Direct-to-video	
2000	Our Lips Are Sealed	No	Executive	Direct-to-video	
2001	Winning London	No	Executive	Direct-to-video	
2001	Holiday In The Sun	No	Executive	Direct-to-video	
2001-2002	So Little Time	No	Executive	FOX Family Channel	
2001-2002	Mary-Kate and Ashley in Action!	Yes	Executive	ABC Kids	Wrote live-action segments to four episodes
2002	Getting There	No	Executive	Direct-to-video	
2002	When In Rome	No	Executive	Direct-to-video	
2003	The Challenge	No	Executive	Direct-to-video	
2004	New York Minute	No	Yes		
