= Dualstar =

American limited liability company

Dualstar Entertainment Group, LLC
- Type: Private LLC
- Industry: Fashion, Entertainment
- Founded: May 5, 1993; 33 years ago Los Angeles, California, U.S.
- Founder: Robert Thorne
- Headquarters: Culver City, California, United States
- Key people: Ashley Olsen (CEO); Mary-Kate Olsen (Secretary)

Dualstar Entertainment Group, LLC is a privately held American mass media and entertainment limited liability company owned by twin sisters Mary-Kate Olsen and Ashley Olsen. Dualstar was founded May 5, 1993, as Dualstar Productions, before adopting its current name in 1994. The company established a niche for itself when it entered into a producing agreement with ABC for several TV movies, after the twins starred in the long-running television series Full House.

The company quickly became a massive success, becoming synonymous in the 1990s and early 2000s with child-friendly home entertainment. The company produced the second best-selling Kids VHS tapes of the 1990s, behind The Walt Disney Company. In 2005, the company pivoted towards the fashion industry as its main focus, and ceased producing films, television series, magazines, video games, or other popular media. Dualstar was based in Los Angeles, California and is now based in Culver City.

== History ==
=== 1989-1994: Founding, contracts with ABC Television, and BMG Kidz ===
In 1989, the father of American actresses Mary-Kate Olsen and Ashley Olsen, David Olsen retained Robert Thorne, a partner at the law firm Loeb & Loeb, to help re-negotiate their contracts for the series Full House. Impressed with Thorne's work, Olsen hired Thorne to manage his daughters' careers in 1990, when they were only 4-years old.

The sisters were cast in the co-creator of Full House, Jeff Franklin's TV movie, To Grandmother's House We Go, which filmed in Vancouver, Canada beginning in May 1992, with a planned release of that December.

After filming had finished on the movie, the sisters were signed to the record label BMG Kidz in July, and recorded their debut album Brother for Sale that same month. The album was released on October 30, to a tepid reception, with reviewers calling it, "...so self-consciously cute... it's painful. Makes your fillings ache." Despite the album's poor reception among adults, it was well received among its target demographic. Alternatively, the film was very well received across demographics, and was the tenth most watched program across all channels for the week November 30 - December 6. The sales success of the album, and the film's success gave Thorne justified negotiating power when discussing future plans with ABC.

Robert Thorne met with Alan Berger, head of the TV department at talent agency International Creative Management, shortly after the release of To Grandmother's House We Go. Berger represented Jeff Franklin, who wanted an executive producer credit on the next Olsen film. But Thorne had the idea of obtaining executive producer credits for both Mary-Kate and Ashley. Berger's client opted out, "I just couldn't deal with the absurdity of having Jeff Franklin report to two 6-year-olds," Berger said while in the meeting. Thorne explained he, "wanted to establish them as executive producers and run it through their own company."

To better represent the Olsens in their new career ventures, Dualstar Productions was started by Robert Thorne, through Loeb & Loeb, on May 5, 1993. At the time it was established, David Brian Olsen was designated as the president of Dualstar, with Thorne as the Chief executive officer. A month after Dualstar's creation, it was announced ABC Television Network and Dualstar had entered into a production agreement. Dualstar was to produce a 13-episode television series to star the Olsen twins following the final season of Full House, and a TV-movie for ABC, in addition to developing other programming. The agreement would also give ABC participation in the next Mary-Kate and Ashley music album and music-video collection in which ABC would then receive royalties.

Production on the first TV movie began June 3, 1993, before the news of the deal with ABC had even been made public. In a co-production between Dualstar and Green/Epstein, the team behind To Grandmother's House We Go, and with Mary-Kate and Ashley executive producing, it was decided to do another Holiday film. The new movie entitled Double, Double, Toil and Trouble would be slated for a 1993 Halloween release. Mary-Kate and Ashley didn't actually hire the writer and director, as the executive producer would normally do. Instead, the move was the first step in "empowering" the Olsens and their company, Thorne explained. The pay for both Mary-Kate and Ashley, for their first two TV movies was $500,000 each.

At the same time, work on their second album I Am the Cute One began, slated for an October release along with a music video tape entitled Our First Video. To coincide with the impending releases, Dualstar launched Mary-Kate and Ashley's Fun Club, the official Olsen fan club.

Our First Video premiered at the 1993 Video Software Dealers Association (VSDA) convention, with the video and the album hitting stores on September 28, 1993. To promote the new album and video, the sisters appeared on an hour-long QVC special, and in what Zoom Express/BMG Kidz executives referred to as a "first-of-its-kind deal" Capital Cities/ABC supplemented the advertising campaign with prime time commercials which would air on six first-run episodes of Full House.

The second foray into music was a massive success, as Our First Video surprised the world when it shot to the top spot of Billboard's Top Music Videos chart the second week it was released. I Am The Cute One also sold very well, and peaked at #149 on the Billboard 200. When Billboard introduced the Kid Albums chart in 1995, the album was still selling enough copies to peak at #25.

=== 1994–1998: The Adventures of and You're Invited Series ===
Following the massive success of Our First Video, on March 8, 1994, it was announced Dualstar and BMG Kidz would be renegotiating the original Olsen record contract. The new contract would be a multi-album, multi-video deal with BMG Kidz, with one or two albums, and three to four videos, expected to be produced in the first year. In connection with the deal, Dualstar formed the subsidiaries Dualstar Records, and Dualstar Videos to produce the albums and videos which would then be distributed by BMG Kidz. Around the same time, through Dualstar and Green/Epstein, the Olsens signed a $1 million minimum deal to appear in the 1994, western TV-movie, How the West Was Fun. Their payment would increase if the film was completed underbudget.

Bob Hinkle, president of Zoom Express/BMG Kidz, said the new Olsen contract was, "much more skewed to video than audio. We're at the point where we're just figuring out thematically what the videos will be; but they will be heavily oriented toward music." He went on to add the decision to renegotiate the Olsens' contract came about because, "everybody realized (the old) contract might not have allowed for this music video product at one time."

With responsibilities diversifying away from just production, on April 12, 1994, Dualstar filed an amendment with the state of California to rename the company from Dualstar Productions to Dualstar Entertainment Group, Inc. The company was reportedly being run by six attorneys at this time.

The new BMG Kidz and Dualstar contract was finalized, and the video concepts were decided upon by July 1994. The new deal gave the Olsens $5 million to $7 million over the next year, and would involve an upfront expenditure by Bertelsmann Music Group in excess of $15 million. Additionally, Bertelsmann would provide the funding for three labels designed to handle different aspects of the Olsen deal, Dualstar Records, Dualstar Video, and Dualstar Interactive. According to the terms of the deal, profits would be split 50-50 between BMG Kidz and Dualstar, and in turn with the Olsens, it would also give Dualstar all rights to their products. It was revealed the videos produced between Dualstar and BMG Kidz would be a musical mystery series, The Adventures of Mary-Kate & Ashley, with the first two episodes titled "The Case of Thorn Mansion", a haunted house thriller, and "The Case of the Logical I Ranch", a Wild West mystery. The videos were planned for a September 13, 1994, release, along with a companion album, "Give Us a Mystery." With two other videos and a companion album being planned to follow spring 1995. Bertelsmann secured commitments from Playskool, Carnival Cruise Line, and MGM Grand Hotel and Theme Park to offer tie-ins for the video series.

Dualstar and BMG Kidz announced the multimedia deal publicly at the July 1994 VSDA convention in Las Vegas. While in the city, on July 25, Mary-Kate and Ashley Olsen appeared at the MGM Grand Adventures theme park to debut the first episode of The Adventures of Mary-Kate & Ashley. According to reports, 15,000 people lined up in 105-degree temperatures at the theme park just to have the chance to walk past the Olsens.

On September 12, the day before the release of The Adventures of Mary-Kate & Ashley, Dualstar and American Online presented a press conference hosted by Mary-Kate and Ashley at 5 pm. Following the Full House episode which aired on September 13, ABC aired The Adventures of Mary-Kate & Ashley theme song as a music video to advertise the release. To further promote the series, on September 17, ABC aired a behind-the-scenes look at The Adventures of Mary-Kate & Ashley. The first two videos were a smash hit, and premiered on Billboard's Top Kid Video sales chart.

In January 1995, a segment for the next "Adventures" film was shot at SeaWorld Orlando. The next two installments in the series would be heavily promoted through a tie-in with Sea World, including with a personal meet and greet with the Olsens at SeaWorld San Diego, on April 8 and April 9.

The third and fourth films in the Adventures series "The Case of the Sea World Adventure", and "The Case of the Mystery Cruise" released in April to more sales success. Both titles debuted on the Billboard Kid Video chart at #14 and #13 respectively. To promote the tapes, ABC aired the TV-special The Adventures of Mary-Kate & Ashley: Mystery on the High Seas.

In April 1995, while Mary-Kate and Ashley were busy filming the final season of Full House, Warner Bros. who produced the series for ABC, approached Dualstar about having the sisters star in the theatrical film Me and My Shadow. In addition to the film, Warner Bros. conveyed their interest in obtaining the home video distribution rights to The Adventures of Mary-Kate & Ashley. On April 14, WarnerVision Entertainment took over control of five prerecorded titles on the market, while proceeding with the production of up to 10 additional released over the next two years.

According to Robert Thorne, BMG agreed WarnerVision had become the obvious home for video. "They knew in their hearts," that the switch would be made, he says. "We made it very clear to them where we wanted to be." To end the contract, which still had a year to run, Thorne said Dualstar Entertainment Group paid a "nominal" fee toward BMG's $1.3 million production budget for the two newest Adventures films. The new contract between Dualstar and WarnerVision, Thorne told Billboard, it was a significant financial improvement.

Me and My Shadow, which would co-star Steve Guttenberg and Kirstie Alley, started filming right after filming wrapped on Full House and was shot in New York. Each sister was paid $1.6 million for their roles in the film.

The fifth and sixth installments of The Adventures of Mary-Kate & Ashley, The Case of the Fun House Mystery and The Case of the Christmas Caper were filmed back to back. As well as the first video in a new series, You're Invited to Mary-Kate & Ashley's entitled Sleepover Party. All three tapes were released on video on September 12, 1995.

Me and My Shadow was retitled It Takes Two, and premiered at the Heartland International Film Festival on November 9, 1995, and released domestically to theaters on November 17, 1995. It Takes Two was generally well received, with The Los Angeles Times saying, "as for the Olsen twins, they're perky, precocious types, throwbacks to an earlier Hollywood in which children tended to perform rather than act..." The $14 million film only made $19.5 million at the box office, but made a hefty $75 million in home video sales.

On April 10, 1996, it was announced that Mary-Kate and Ashley, signed a 14-book publishing agreement with Parachute Publishing. Parachute would produce and publish books inspired by the Dualstar serials The Adventures of Mary-Kate & Ashley, and You're Invited to Mary-Kate & Ashley's. Ashley and Mary-Kate were involved in the writing of each book. "We meet with the editors and tell them things we like to do," says Mary-Kate. "I like to horseback ride, so there is a horseback riding adventure. We both like to surf, so there's a surfing book. And Ashley likes ballet, so we did a ballet story."

Since one of the Olsen family's favorite vacation spots was Hawaii, in 1996 Dualstar decided to send the family to the island. While they were there, from June to July, Mary-Kate and Ashley filmed four videos You're Invited to Mary-Kate & Ashley's Hawaiian Beach Party, The Case of the Hotel Who-Done-It, The Case of the Volcano Mystery, and The Case of the U.S. Navy Adventure. Afterwards, the Olsens were sent to film The Case of the U.S. Space Camp Mission, at a Space Camp in Huntsville, Alabama. Despite being filmed after the Hawaiian videos, The Case of the U.S. Space Camp Mission would be released first.

For the videos, Thorne would come up with story ideas and work with the writers. One day he found himself thinking, "let's put them on Jet Skis," which inspired the You're Invited To Mary-Kate and Ashley's Hawaiian Beach Party video.

By March 1997, it was reported the Adventures and You're Invited serials had brought in $77 million. "When the girls left the TV Show [Full House], everybody said their careers were over," said Robert Thorne, "we decided it was time they could step out." With the Olsens in high demand, Thorne and Dualstar had to start limiting the projects taken on. "Rosie O'Donnell's been after me for weeks," Thorne said they aren't doing TV interviews right now. "We don't do the electronic media anymore, it's overkill," Thorne continued. "After a while, the word 'ubiquitous' was cropping up too much... The family wanted them to take some time off, step back, and come back fresh." Thorne explained Dualstar turned down merchandising and licensing bonanzas from "Lunchboxes to horrible network specials... That's exploitative. It doesn't build a career."

The initial contract Dualstar signed with ABC in 1993, called for a 13-episode series to star the Olsens to be made for the network. By 1997, the show at the time being developed under the name Double Trouble, started coming together, with Miller-Boyett, the production company behind Full House, teaming up with Dualstar.

While the specifics were being settled for the show, in July 1998 Dualstar started shooting their next direct to video film, Billboard Dad.

The show, retitled Two of a Kind, was filmed at Warner Bros. Studios Burbank, in front of a live-studio audience. The show premiered September 25, 1998. Two of a Kind fell flat with critics, Howard Rosenberg of the Los Angeles Times said, "What neither of the Olsens is, at this stage, is a budding thespian. Not that the writing here helps them out." Despite the reviews, Two of a Kind premiered with a first-place finish in the 8 PM time slot once occupied by Full House.

By the time, Two of a Kind premiered, the Olsen's Adventures and You're Invited serials had brought in $250 million in sales, and the accompanying books sold 6 million copies.

Their next direct-to-video film, Billboard Dad released to stores on November 10, 1998, to strong sales but poor reviews.

=== 1999-2004: Expansion and global era ===
The new year brought more growth for Dualstar and the merchandising potential of the Olsen brand. On January 20, it was revealed Mary-Kate and Ashley signed a deal with Mattel to launch the following year, their own line of dolls in their likenesses.

In February, continuing the prior success with books, Dualstar published the first two books in a new series inspired by Two of a Kind, with a new installment planned every month.

In March 1999, Dualstar signed a deal with then-Disney-owned animation studio DIC Entertainment to produce an animated series starring Mary-Kate and Ashley based on their Trenchcoat Twins personas. Shortly after that announcement, it was revealed Dualstar would be producing the soccer themed movie Switching Goals for The Wonderful World of Disney. Not everything was going according to plan though, changes to the ABC line up made people start wondering if Two of a Kind could be at risk of cancelation. By April 5, it was confirmed that ABC would be ending the series after its first season.

For their 13th birthday, on June 11, FOX Family Channel aired a 13 hour long marathon of Olsen television. After celebrating with their family, Mary-Kate and Ashley flew to France to work on their next Dualstar film, Passport to Paris, which would be released November 9, 1999. Passport to Paris was shot in Paris, France, over a period of three weeks, starting in June.

The series finale of Two of a Kind aired on Friday, July 9, 1999.

In September 1999, plans were announced for a partnership between Dualstar and Acclaim Entertainment to produce Olsen video games. The first game was made to target girls aged 5 to 12, with a release date expected towards the end of November 1999. "There's this whole base of females who are dying to be part of the interactive experience," said Steve Lux, Acclaim's vice-president of marketing. "It's just a matter of writing the write software for that audience.

Upon the November 9, release of Passport to Paris it debuted at #12 on the Billboard chart Top Kid Videos. That same week, Billboard Dad held the fourth spot, and You're Invited to Mary-Kate & Ashley's Fashion Party was in the 8th spot.

Recording of the Olsen's next album Cool Yule took place over four days. Upon its release it was met with poor reviews, Mitch Schafer of The Tampa Tribune said, "Most of the singing is done by no-name hired hands, with the Olsens dropping in every now and then to fulfill their contract." He went on to say, "Adults will be nauseated, kids will be bored."

Switching Goals was scheduled to air on October 24, but was pushed to December 12. The film was released on VHS and DVD on April 11, 2000.

In January 2000, The Beanstalk Group reached an agreement to license Mary-Kate and Ashley from Dualstar, for a line of clothing, accessories, and cosmetics tentatively called "MK&A". The Beanstalk Group would work as a middle man, obtaining a license, and approaching retailers to carry products utilizing the license. Beanstalk co-chairman Michael Stone said the Olsens interested him because their empire is built on the solid foundation of books. "For an entertainment property to be successful over the long term, we believe it has to consistently deliver a fantasy to the core audience. Mary-Kate and Ashley fulfill for girls the fantasy. Girls want to be like Mary-Kate and Ashley."

In February 2000, at the North American International Toy Fair Mattel showed off the first Mary-Kate and Ashley dolls produced in their likenesses. With a sale-price of $5, the dolls would hit store shelves in March.

In April it was announced a Mary-Kate and Ashley clothing line geared towards girls 6 to 12, would premiere at Walmart stores that spring. The line of apparel and accessories would be stocked at 2,500 stores across America.

In October 2000, it was announced Dualstar would be producing a lifestyle magazine geared towards teenagers, with Mary-Kate and Ashley sharing the job as editors in chief.

In December 2000, the upcoming animated series based on Mary-Kate and Ashley was initially named as Action Girls and would now feature the twins as globe-trotting movie stars. DIC would produce the series as a co-production with French broadcaster Canal J. The cartoon was subsequently picked up by ABC in 2001 for Disney's One Saturday Morning block and would be produced by DIC under a newly-formed Dualstar Animation label. The series, officially titled Mary-Kate and Ashley in Action! premiered in November 2001 and was pre-sold by DIC internationally.

In 2002, the Olsens signed a 10-year contract of partnership at the age of 16, with Thorne.

In 2003, the group estimated that the sales are around $1.4 billion. The interactive unit subsequently filed a lawsuit against Acclaim Entertainment in 2004. Also that year, upon their 18th birthday, the Olsens took control of the Dualstar studio.

On May 7, 2004, the company released New York Minute, the Olsen twins' last and only theatrical film since 1995's It Takes Two. The film did not do well at the box office, and suffered negative critical reception. Since then, Dualstar and the Olsens have neither produced nor starred in another film.

"There is every intention to continue to nurture and celebrate the young customer base, and safely pursue the teen and young adult customer," Dualstar CEO Robert Thorne said. "Just as The Walt Disney Company produces feature films under the Disney and Touchstone labels respectively. Different audiences for us. But all positive values."

=== 2005-present: Entertainment production decline, and pivot to fashion ===
In January 2005, the Olsens parted ways with Robert Thorne, and hired Diane Reichenberger.

In September 2005, Dualstar partnered with Dylan and Cole Sprouse, the twin brothers from Disney's The Suite Life of Zack & Cody. Dualstar launched a boys division, and signed the Sprouse twins to be the face of the division. The Sprouse family created their own company, which would bear their name as D.C. Sprouse, which would then work and license with Dualstar. The division produced Code, a magazine geared toward a young male demographic.

Expanding into furniture and home décor lines, in January 2006 Mary-Kate and Ashley announced a new signature furniture line geared towards girls 4 to 18.

By 2008, A clothing line for D.C. Sprouse was produced and sold online. "These are clothes they wear," said Tori Matt, Dualstar's marketing director. "They've been known to sit down with a Sharpie and actually doodle a graphic for a T-shirt."

In April 2015, Mary-Kate and Ashley reached a deal with Viacom-owned Nickelodeon to license the entire library.

== Company units ==
- Dualstar Animation, LLC. established March 6, 2001. Terminated effective December 16, 2011.
- Dualstar Central Design Studio, LLC. established November 27, 2001. Dissolution effective February 5, 2007.
- Dualstar Consumer Products, LLC. established November 29, 2000.
- Dualstar Interactive, LLC. established August 24, 2001. Terminated effective January 22, 2007.
- Dualstar Music, LLC. established November 27, 2001.
- Dualstar On Line, LLC. established November 27, 2001. Terminated effective January 23, 2007.
- Dualstar Publications, LLC. established August 24, 2001.
- Dualstar Records, LLC. established November 27, 2001. Terminated effective December 28, 2008.
- Dualstar Video, LLC. established November 27, 2001. Terminated effective January 22, 2007.
- The Row, established November 29, 2005. (Note: Upon its creation, it was a wholly owned subsidiary of Dualstar. On July 26, 2024, ownership of The Row trademark was transferred to a newly created TR Holding, LLC., which was established in January 19, 2023, with Ashley Olsen serving as CEO.)

== Leadership ==
=== Current ===
- Executives
  - Ashley Olsen, Chief Executive Officer, and Chief Financial Officer
  - Mary-Kate Olsen, Secretary

=== Past leadership ===
- Presidents
  - David Brian Olsen (1993)
  - Gregory Redlitz (2001) (Note: His official title was Executive Vice President of business affairs and strategic planning.)
  - Jill Collage (2008–2011) (Note: Her official title was Executive Vice President.)
  - Judy Swartz (Note: Her official title was Senior Vice President, in addition to Executive Designer for the Dualstar Central Design Studio division.)
- Chief executive officers (CEO)
  - Robert Thorne (1993–2005)
  - Diane M. Reichenberger (2005–2008)
- Managers
  - Peter F. Harris (2001–2006)
  - David Brian Olsen (2005)
  - Gary S. Rattet (2000–2006) (Note: His official title was co. manager.)
  - Robert Thorne (1993–2005)
- Treasurers
  - Charlene Penna (2007)
  - Jessica Jullien (2021–2023)

== Filmography ==
=== Theatrical films ===
- It Takes Two (1995)
- New York Minute (2004)

=== Direct-to-video films ===
- Billboard Dad (1998)
- Passport to Paris (1999)
- Our Lips Are Sealed (2000)
- Winning London (2001)
- Holiday in the Sun (2001)
- Getting There (2002)
- When in Rome (2002)
- The Challenge (2003)

=== Television films ===
- To Grandmother's House We Go (1992)
- Double, Double, Toil and Trouble (1993)
- How the West Was Fun (1994)
- Switching Goals (1999)

=== Direct-to-video short film series ===
- The Adventures of Mary-Kate & Ashley (1994–1997)
- You're Invited to Mary-Kate & Ashley's (1995–2000)

=== Television series ===
- Two of a Kind (1998–1999)
- So Little Time (2001–2002)
- Mary-Kate and Ashley in Action! (2001–2002)

== Audio works ==
Year	Title	Category	Platform	Notes	Ref.
2006	Real Girls, Real Advice With Jess	Podcast	iTunes Podcasts	Hosted by Jessica Weiner	
2006	The Official Mary-Kate and Ashley Podcast	Podcast	iTunes Podcasts		

== Criticism and controversies ==
=== VHS tampering ===
On November 9, 1999, when the Dualstar film Passport to Paris was released, certain customers found their copies interrupted 30 minutes into the film with a pornographic film. At the same time, copies of the 1998 film Jack Frost had also been found to be compromised, in addition to copies of Pinocchio. Warner Bros. would not comment about the incident other than to say the company is "investigating this and will have a comment after the holidays."

=== Internship lawsuit ===
A class action lawsuit against Dualstar alleges that the Entertainment Group failed to pay interns for menial tasks. The suit, brought forth by forty past and current interns, argues that the interns should have been paid minimum wage because they were doing similar jobs as their paid colleagues, without receiving academic or vocational credit.

Dualstar responded, "As an initial matter, Dualstar is an organization that is committed to treating all individuals fairly and in accordance with all applicable laws. The allegations in the complaint filed against Dualstar are groundless, and Dualstar will vigorously defend itself against plaintiff's claims in court, not before the media. Dualstar is confident that once the true facts of this case are revealed, the lawsuit will be dismissed in its entirety." The lawsuit was settled out of court in March 2017 for $140,000.
