= Robert L. Levy (film producer) =

American film producer

Robert L. Levy is a film producer with notable box office hits such as Wedding Crashers, Serendipity, Pay It Forward, Van Wilder, The Wedding Planner. His production company is Tapestry Films, which in 2002 had a first look deal with Miramax.

== Filmography ==
He was a producer in all films unless otherwise noted.

=== Film ===
Year	Film	Credit	Notes
1971	The Todd Killings	Associate producer	
1977	Smokey and the Bandit	Executive producer	
1982	Safari 3000	Associate producer	
1986	Rad		
1987	The Killing Time		
1990	Kid		
1991	Point Break		
1992	Mikey		
1993	Warlock: The Armageddon		
1995	Payback	Executive producer	
1995	A Kid in King Arthur's Court		
1997	The Last Time I Committed Suicide	Executive producer	
1997	A Kid in Aladdin's Palace		Direct-to-video
1998	Denial	Executive producer	
1998	Mafia!	Executive producer	
1998	Billboard Dad	Executive producer	Direct-to-video
1999	She's All That		
1999	Swing	Executive producer	
1999	Diplomatic Siege		
2000	Pay It Forward		
2000	Blood Surf		Direct-to-video
2000	Our Lips Are Sealed	Executive producer	Direct-to-video
2001	The Wedding Planner		
2001	Winning London	Executive producer	Direct-to-video
2001	Serendipity		
2001	On the Line		
2001	Tangled		
2001	Holiday in the Sun	Executive producer	Direct-to-video
2002	Van Wilder		
2002	Getting There	Executive producer	Direct-to-video
2002	When in Rome	Executive producer	Direct-to-video
2003	The Challenge	Executive producer	Direct-to-video
2005	Wedding Crashers		
2005	Underclassman		
2006	Employee of the Month		
2006	Van Wilder: The Rise of Taj		
2007	The Flock	Executive producer	
2007	The Comebacks		
2009	Van Wilder: Freshman Year		Direct-to-video
2009	Wrong Turn at Tahoe		Direct-to-video
2009	Old Dogs		
2012	Breaking the Girls	Executive producer	
2015	Point Break	Executive producer	
2020	Scars	Executive producer	Short film

As writer

Year	Film	Notes
1977	Smokey and the Bandit	
1980	Smokey and the Bandit II	
1983	Smokey and the Bandit Part 3	
1994	Dark Tide	
1995	A Kid in King Arthur's Court	
1997	A Kid in Aladdin's Palace	Direct-to-video
2000	Blood Surf	Direct-to-video

Second unit director or assistant director

Year	Film	Role	Notes
1990	Kid	Second unit director	
1992	Mikey	Second unit director	
1993	Warlock: The Armageddon	Second unit director	
1999	Passport to Paris	Second unit director: Paris	Direct-to-video
2000	Blood Surf	Second unit director	Direct-to-video
2001	Tangled	Second unit director	
2002	Getting There	Second unit director	Direct-to-video
2002	When in Rome	Second unit director	Direct-to-video
2003	The Challenge	Second unit director	Direct-to-video

Miscellaneous crew

Year	Film	Role
1974	McQ	Production coordinator
1975	Brannigan	Production assistant
1976	Gator	Producer: Second unit

As director

Year	Film	Notes
1997	A Kid in Aladdin's Palace	Direct-to-video

Camera and electrical department

Year	Film	Role
1994	Exit to Eden	Electrician: New Orleans

Production manager

Year	Film	Role	Notes
1999	Passport to Paris	Unit production manager	Direct-to-video

Thanks

Year	Film	Role	Notes
1999	Passport to Paris	Special thanks	Direct-to-video

=== Television ===
Year	Title	Notes
1993	Full Eclipse	Television film

As writer

Year	Title	Notes
1994	Bandit Goes Country	Television film
1994	Bandit Bandit	Television film
1994	Beauty and the Bandit	Television film
1994	Bandit's Silver Angel	Television film

Thanks

Year	Title	Role
2001−02	So Little Time	Special thanks
