= 2004 Teen Choice Awards =

American awards ceremony held in California

- Date: August 8, 2004
- Location: Universal Amphitheatre, Universal City, California, U.S.
- Hosted by: Paris Hilton and Nicole Richie

Television/radio coverage
- Network: Fox

The 2004 Teen Choice Awards ceremony was held on August 8, 2004, at the Universal Amphitheatre, Universal City, California. The event was hosted by Paris Hilton and Nicole Richie with Blink-182, JoJo, Lenny Kravitz, and Ashlee Simpson as performers. Mike Myers received the Ultimate Choice Award, Bethany Hamilton received the Courage Award, Tony Hawk and Mia Hamm received the Male and Female Athlete Awards respectively, Adam Sandler received the Comedian Award, and Ashlee Simpson received the Fresh Face Award.

== Performers ==
- Blink 182 – "Down"
- JoJo – "Leave (Get Out)"
- Lenny Kravitz – "Where Are We Runnin'?"
- Ashlee Simpson – "Pieces of Me"

== Presenters ==
- Jessica Alba, Shawn Wayans, and Marlon Wayans – presented Choice Date Movie
- Kristin Kreuk and Tom Welling – presented Choice TV Reality Show
- Seth Green, Matthew Lillard, and Dax Shepard – introduced Blink-182
- Jesse McCartney – introduced Kelly Osbourne and Sharon Osbourne
- Kelly Osbourne and Sharon Osbourne – presented Choice Album
- Anne Hathaway and Nick Lachey – presented Choice TV Actress Drama
- Chris Pratt and Gregory Smith – introduced JoJo
- Paula Abdul and Randy Jackson – presented Choice Movie Thriller
- Jimmy Fallon and Verne Troyer – presented Ultimate Choice Award
- Diana DeGarmo, Raven-Symoné, Beverley Mitchell, and Brittany Snow – presented Choice TV Breakout Actor
- Jesse James – introduced Lenny Kravitz
- Brittany Murphy and Sean Hayes – presented Choice TV Drama
- James Lafferty and Chad Michael Murray – presented Choice Movie Actress Comedy
- J-Kwon – introduced Serena Williams, Tyra Banks, and Tony Hawk
- Serena Williams, Tyra Banks, and Tony Hawk – presented Choice Movie Actor Comedy
- Xzibit – introduced Wilmer Valderrama and Mischa Barton
- Mischa Barton and Wilmer Valderrama – presented Choice Fresh Face and introduced Ashlee Simpson
- Christina Milian, Method Man, and Redman – presented Choice Music Single
- Janet Jackson – presented Courage Award
- Jon Heder as Napoleon Dynamite – introduced Christina Applegate and Seann William Scott
- Christina Applegate and Seann William Scott – presented Choice Movie Comedy
- Lenny Kravitz – presented Choice Movie Actress Drama

== Winners and nominees ==
Winners are listed first and highlighted in bold text.

=== Movies ===
Choice Movie: Action Adventure	Choice Movie Actor: Drama/Action Adventure
**Harry Potter and the Prisoner of Azkaban**; The Day After Tomorrow; Hellboy; Kill Bill: Volume 2; The Lord of the Rings: The Return of the King; The Matrix Revolutions; Troy; Van Helsing	**Brad Pitt – Troy**; Orlando Bloom – The Lord of the Rings: The Return of the King & Troy; Hugh Jackman – Van Helsing; Dwayne "The Rock" Johnson – Walking Tall; Mekhi Phifer – Honey; Keanu Reeves – The Matrix Revolutions; Arnold Schwarzenegger – Terminator 3: Rise of the Machines; Elijah Wood – The Lord of the Rings: The Return of the King
Choice Movie Actress: Drama/Action Adventure	Choice Movie: Comedy
**Halle Berry – Gothika**; Jessica Alba – Honey; Kate Beckinsale – Underworld & Van Helsing; Mandy Moore – Chasing Liberty; Carrie-Anne Moss – The Matrix Revolutions; Julia Stiles – Mona Lisa Smile & The Prince and Me; Uma Thurman – Kill Bill: Volume 2; Liv Tyler – The Lord of the Rings: The Return of the King	**Shrek 2**; 13 Going on 30; 50 First Dates; American Wedding; Elf; Freaky Friday; Mean Girls; School of Rock
Choice Movie Actor: Comedy	Choice Movie Actress: Comedy
**Adam Sandler – 50 First Dates**; Jack Black – School of Rock; Will Ferrell – Elf; Topher Grace – Win a Date with Tad Hamilton!; Mark Ruffalo – 13 Going on 30; Seann William Scott – American Wedding; Ben Stiller – Starsky & Hutch; Owen Wilson – Starsky & Hutch	**Lindsay Lohan – Mean Girls**; Drew Barrymore – 50 First Dates; Kate Bosworth – Win a Date with Tad Hamilton!; Jennifer Garner – 13 Going on 30; Alyson Hannigan – American Wedding; Kate Hudson – Raising Helen; Rachel McAdams – Mean Girls; Queen Latifah – Barbershop 2: Back in Business
Choice Date Movie	Choice Thriller Movie
**50 First Dates**; 13 Going on 30; Along Came Polly; Chasing Liberty; Honey; Love Don't Cost a Thing; Win a Date with Tad Hamilton!; You Got Served	**The Texas Chainsaw Massacre**; The Butterfly Effect; Dawn of the Dead; Freddy vs. Jason; Gothika; Secret Window; Underworld; Van Helsing
Choice Movie Your Parents Didn't Want You to See	Choice Movie Sleazebag
**American Wedding**; Dawn of the Dead; EuroTrip; Freddy vs. Jason; The Girl Next Door; Kill Bill: Volume 2; Scary Movie 3; The Texas Chainsaw Massacre	**Seann William Scott – American Wedding**; Kirsten Dunst – Mona Lisa Smile; Judy Greer – 13 Going on 30; Rachel McAdams – Mean Girls; Mandy Moore – Saved!; Andy Serkis – The Lord of the Rings: The Return of the King; Sarah Silverman – School of Rock; Billy Bob Thornton – Bad Santa
Choice Breakout Movie Actor	Choice Breakout Movie Actress
**Chad Michael Murray – A Cinderella Story**; Jonathan Bennett – Mean Girls; Josh Duhamel – Win a Date with Tad Hamilton!; Matthew Goode – Chasing Liberty; Omari "Omarion" Grandberry – You Got Served; Garrett Hedlund – Troy; Lil' Romeo – Honey; Tom Welling – Cheaper by the Dozen	**Lindsay Lohan – Freaky Friday, Confessions of a Teenage Drama Queen, & Mean Girls**; Jessica Alba – Honey; Keisha Castle-Hughes – Whale Rider; Scarlett Johansson – Lost in Translation & The Perfect Score; Keira Knightley – Pirates of the Caribbean: The Curse of the Black Pearl & King Arthur; Rachel McAdams – Mean Girls & The Notebook; Eva Mendes – 2 Fast 2 Furious, Once Upon a Time in Mexico, Out of Time, & Stuck on You; Christina Milian – Love Don't Cost a Thing
Choice Movie Chemistry	Choice Movie Liplock
**Orlando Bloom & Keira Knightley – Pirates of the Caribbean: The Curse of the Black Pearl**; Jessica Alba & Mekhi Phifer – Honey; Nick Cannon & Christina Milian – Love Don't Cost a Thing; Jennifer Garner & Mark Ruffalo – 13 Going on 30; Hugh Jackman & Kate Beckinsale – Van Helsing; Lindsay Lohan & Jonathan Bennett – Mean Girls; Adam Sandler & Drew Barrymore – 50 First Dates; Ben Stiller & Owen Wilson – Starsky & Hutch	**Orlando Bloom and Keira Knightley – Pirates of the Caribbean: The Curse of the Black Pearl**; Jessica Alba & Mekhi Phifer – Honey; Kate Bosworth & Topher Grace – Win a Date with Tad Hamilton!; Jason Biggs & Alyson Hannigan – American Wedding; Nick Cannon & Christina Milian – Love Don't Cost a Thing; Jennifer Garner & Mark Ruffalo – 13 Going on 30; Adam Sandler & Drew Barrymore – 50 First Dates; Piper Perabo & Ashton Kutcher – Cheaper by the Dozen
Choice Movie Hissy Fit	Choice Movie Fight/Action Sequence
**Lindsay Lohan – Freaky Friday**; Jason Biggs – American Wedding; Jennifer Garner – 13 Going on 30; Topher Grace – Win a Date with Tad Hamilton!; Ashton Kutcher – Cheaper by the Dozen; Rachel McAdams – Mean Girls; Mandy Moore – Saved!; Ben Stiller – Along Came Polly	**Johnny Depp vs. Geoffrey Rush – Pirates of the Caribbean: The Curse of the Black Pearl**; Battle at Gondor – The Lord of the Rings: The Return of the King; Tom Cruise vs. Hiroyuki Sanada – The Last Samurai; Hugh Jackman vs. Richard Roxburgh – Van Helsing; Lindsay Lohan vs. Rachel McAdams – Mean Girls; Brad Pitt vs. Eric Bana – Troy; Keanu Reeves vs. Hugo Weaving – The Matrix Revolutions; Uma Thurman vs. Daryl Hannah – Kill Bill: Volume 2
Choice Movie Liar	Choice Movie Blush
**Johnny Depp – Pirates of the Caribbean: The Curse of the Black Pearl**; Jack Black – School of Rock; Nick Cannon – Love Don't Cost a Thing; Josh Duhamel – Win a Date with Tad Hamilton!; Matthew Goode – Chasing Liberty; Eugene Levy – New York Minute; Lindsay Lohan – Mean Girls; Andy Serkis – The Lord of the Rings: The Return of the King	**Lindsay Lohan – Mean Girls**; Kate Bosworth – Win a Date with Tad Hamilton!; Hilary Duff – Cheaper by the Dozen; Jennifer Garner – 13 Going on 30; Rachel McAdams – Mean Girls; Mary-Kate and Ashley Olsen – New York Minute; Seann William Scott – American Wedding; Ben Stiller – Along Came Polly
Choice Summer Movie
**Spider-Man 2**; Anchorman: The Legend of Ron Burgundy; A Cinderella Story; DodgeBall: A True Underdog Story; Harry Potter and the Prisoner of Azkaban; I, Robot; King Arthur; The Notebook; Shrek 2; White Chicks

=== Television ===
Choice TV Drama/Action Adventure	Choice TV Actor: Drama/Action Adventure
**The O.C.**; 7th Heaven; Alias; American Dreams; Everwood; Joan of Arcadia; One Tree Hill; Smallville	**Adam Brody – The O.C.**; Josh Duhamel – Las Vegas; David Gallagher – 7th Heaven; Ben McKenzie – The O.C.; Chad Michael Murray – One Tree Hill; Mekhi Phifer – ER; Gregory Smith – Everwood; Tom Welling – Smallville
Choice TV Actress: Drama/Action Adventure	Choice TV Comedy
**Jennifer Garner – Alias**; Mischa Barton – The O.C.; Rachel Bilson – The O.C.; Hilarie Burton – One Tree Hill; Kristin Kreuk – Smallville; Brittany Snow – American Dreams; Amber Tamblyn – Joan of Arcadia; Emily VanCamp – Everwood	**Friends**; The Bernie Mac Show; Gilmore Girls; Malcolm in the Middle; Scrubs; The Simpsons; That '70s Show; That's So Raven
Choice TV Actor: Comedy	Choice TV Actress: Comedy
**Ashton Kutcher – That '70s Show**; Anthony Anderson – All About the Andersons; Zach Braff – Scrubs; Topher Grace – That '70s Show; Matt LeBlanc – Friends; Bernie Mac – The Bernie Mac Show; Frankie Muniz – Malcolm in the Middle; Matthew Perry – Friends	**Jennifer Aniston – Friends**; Alexis Bledel – Gilmore Girls; Amanda Bynes – What I Like About You; Kaley Cuoco – 8 Simple Rules; Eve – Eve; Jennifer Freeman – My Wife and Kids; Mila Kunis – That '70s Show; Raven-Symoné – That's So Raven
Choice TV Reality	Choice Reality/Variety TV Star: Male
**Punk'd**; America's Next Top Model; American Idol; Fear Factor; Newlyweds: Nick and Jessica; Pimp My Ride; The Simple Life: Interns; Survivor	**Ashton Kutcher – Punk'd**; Rupert Boneham – Survivor; Simon Cowell – American Idol; Nick Lachey – Newlyweds: Nick and Jessica; Ty Pennington – Extreme Makeover: Home Edition & Trading Spaces; Bill Rancic – The Apprentice; Donald Trump – The Apprentice; Xzibit – Pimp My Ride
Choice Reality/Variety TV Star: Female	Choice TV Late Night
**Jessica Simpson – Newlyweds: Nick and Jessica**; Paula Abdul – American Idol; Tyra Banks – America's Next Top Model; Fantasia Barrino – American Idol; Paris Hilton – The Simple Life; Yoanna House – America's Next Top Model; Amber Mariano – Survivor; Meredith Phillips – The Bachelorette	**Saturday Night Live**; Chappelle's Show; Jimmy Kimmel Live!; Last Call with Carson Daly; The Late Late Show with Craig Kilborn; Late Night with Conan O'Brien; Late Show with David Letterman; Mad TV
Choice Breakout TV Show	Choice Breakout TV Actor
**The O.C.**; The Apprentice; Chappelle's Show; Eve; Joan of Arcadia; One Tree Hill; The Swan; Tru Calling	**Chad Michael Murray – One Tree Hill**; Adam Brody – The O.C.; Josh Duhamel – Las Vegas; Kevin Hart – The Big House; Tyler Hoechlin – 7th Heaven; James Lafferty – One Tree Hill; Ben McKenzie – The O.C; Jason Ritter – Joan of Arcadia
Choice Breakout TV Actress	Choice TV Sidekick
**Mischa Barton – The O.C.**; Rachel Bilson – The O.C.; Hilarie Burton – One Tree Hill; Eliza Dushku – Tru Calling; Eve – Eve; Bethany Joy Lenz – One Tree Hill; Parminder Nagra – ER; Amber Tamblyn – Joan of Arcadia	**Sean Hayes – Will & Grace**; James Badge Dale – 24; Donald Faison – Scrubs; Vanessa Lengies – American Dreams; Bethany Joy Lenz – One Tree Hill; Allison Mack – Smallville; Chris Pratt – Everwood; Wilmer Valderrama – That '70s Show
Choice TV Personality
**Ashton Kutcher**; Sean Combs; Simon Cowell; Paris Hilton; Ryan Seacrest; Jessica Simpson; Donald Trump; Xzibit

=== Music ===
Choice Male Artist	Choice Female Artist
**Justin Timberlake**; Clay Aiken; Chingy; Jay-Z; Ludacris; John Mayer; Usher; Kanye West	**Avril Lavigne**; Christina Aguilera; Beyoncé; Hilary Duff; Janet Jackson; Jennifer Lopez; Jessica Simpson; Britney Spears
Choice R&B Artist	Choice Rap Artist
**Usher**; Beyoncé; The Black Eyed Peas; Alicia Keys; Sean Paul; Justin Timberlake; Kanye West; Mario Winans	**D12**; Cassidy; Chingy; Missy Elliott; J-Kwon; Jay-Z; Ludacris; Twista
Choice Rock Group	Choice Single
**Evanescence**; 3 Doors Down; Good Charlotte; Hoobastank; Maroon 5; New Found Glory; Simple Plan; Yellowcard	**"Toxic" – Britney Spears**; "Baby Boy" – Beyoncé feat. Sean Paul; "Hey Ya!" – OutKast; "I Don't Wanna Know" – Mario Winans feat. Enya & P. Diddy; "Milkshake" – Kelis; "My Immortal" – Evanescence; "This Love" – Maroon 5; "Yeah!" – Usher feat. Lil Jon & Ludacris
Choice Album	Choice R&B Track
**Confessions – Usher**; The College Dropout – Kanye West; Dangerously in Love – Beyoncé; Elephunk – The Black Eyed Peas; Fallen – Evanescence; In This Skin – Jessica Simpson; Songs About Jane – Maroon 5; Speakerboxxx/The Love Below – OutKast	**"Yeah!" – Usher feat. Lil Jon & Ludacris**; "Fell in Love with a Boy" – Joss Stone; "I Don't Wanna Know" – Mario Winans feat. Enya & P. Diddy; "If I Ain't Got You" – Alicia Keys; "Naughty Girl" – Beyoncé; "Sorry 2004" – Ruben Studdard; "Talk About Our Love" – Brandy feat. Kanye West; "Walked Outta Heaven" – Jagged Edge
Choice Hip-Hop/Rap Track	Choice Rock Track
**"Where Is the Love?" – The Black Eyed Peas**; "All Falls Down" – Kanye West feat. Syleena Johnson; "Dirt off Your Shoulder" – Jay Z; "One Call Away" – Chingy feat. J-Weav; "Salt Shaker" – Ying Yang Twins feat. Lil Jon & The East Side Boyz; "Stand Up" – Ludacris feat. Shawnna; "Tipsy" – J-Kwon; "The Way You Move" – OutKast feat. Sleepy Brown	**"This Love" – Maroon 5**; "Feeling This" – Blink-182; "Here Without You" – 3 Doors Down; "Hold On" – Good Charlotte; "It's My Life" – No Doubt; "My Immortal" – Evanescence; "The Reason" – Hoobastank; "Somewhere I Belong" – Linkin Park
Choice Love Song	Choice Breakout Music Artist
**"I Miss You" – Blink-182**; "8th World Wonder" – Kimberly Locke; "Burn" – Usher; "Everytime" – Britney Spears; "If I Ain't Got You" – Alicia Keys; "The Reason" – Hoobastank; "Sorry 2004" – Ruben Studdard; "Take My Breath Away" – Jessica Simpson	**Maroon 5**; Clay Aiken; Hilary Duff; J-Kwon; Ruben Studdard; Kanye West; Mario Winans; Yellowcard
Choice Music Hook Up (collaboration)	Choice Music Tour
**"Yeah!" – Usher feat. Lil Jon & Ludacris**; "Baby Boy" – Beyoncé feat. Sean Paul; "Frontin'" – Pharrell feat. Jay Z; "I Don't Wanna Know" – Mario Winans feat. Enya & P. Diddy; "Me Against the Music" – Britney Spears feat. Madonna; "Shake Ya Tailfeather" – Nelly, Diddy & Murphy Lee; "The Way You Move" – OutKast feat. Sleepy Brown; "Where Is the Love?" – The Black Eyed Peas feat. Justin Timberlake	**No Doubt & Blink-182**; 3 Doors Down & Nickelback; Incubus & The Vines; Ladies First Tour (Beyoncé, Missy Elliott and Alicia Keys); Avril Lavigne; John Mayer with Maroon 5; Jessica Simpson; Britney Spears
Choice Summer Song
**"Pieces of Me" – Ashlee Simpson**; "Burn" – Usher; "Dip It Low" – Christina Milian; "If I Ain't Got You" – Alicia Keys; "The Reason" – Hoobastank; "Slow Motion" – Juvenile feat. Soulja Slim; "Turn Me On" – Kevin Lyttle; "Welcome Back" – Mase

=== Miscellaneous ===
Choice Male Hottie	Choice Female Hottie
**Orlando Bloom**; Adam Brody; Ashton Kutcher; Chad Michael Murray; Brad Pitt; Justin Timberlake; Usher; Tom Welling	**Jessica Simpson**; Jessica Alba; Beyoncé; Kate Hudson; Keira Knightley; Rachel McAdams; Eva Mendes; Britney Spears
Choice Comedian	Choice Male Athlete
**Adam Sandler**; Jack Black; Jim Carrey; Dave Chappelle; Jimmy Fallon; Will Ferrell; Tina Fey; Chris Rock	**Tony Hawk**; Lance Armstrong; Tom Brady; Kobe Bryant; Dale Earnhardt Jr.; Derek Jeter; Phil Mickelson; Tiger Woods
Choice Female Athlete	Choice Male Fashion Icon
**Mia Hamm**; Sue Bird; Bethany Hamilton; Betty Lennox; Meg Mallon; Maria Sharapova; Annika Sörenstam; Serena Williams	**Brad Pitt**; Johnny Depp; Jay-Z; Tobey Maguire; Chad Michael Murray; Ryan Seacrest; Will Smith; Justin Timberlake
Choice Female Fashion Icon
**Jessica Simpson**; Mischa Barton; Halle Berry; Kate Hudson; Avril Lavigne; Rachel McAdams; Nicole Richie; Liv Tyler
