= It Takes Two (1995 film) =

1995 comedy film directed by Andy Tennant

- Theatrical release poster
- Directed by: Andy Tennant
- Written by: Deborah Dean Davis
- Produced by: James Orr; Jim Cruickshank
- Starring: Kirstie Alley; Steve Guttenberg; Mary-Kate Olsen; Ashley Olsen; Philip Bosco; Jane Sibbett
- Cinematography: Kenneth D. Zunder
- Edited by: Roger Bondelli
- Music by: Sherman Foote; Ray Foote
- Production companies: Rysher Entertainment; Orr & Cruickshank Productions; Dualstar Productions
- Distributed by: Warner Bros.
- Release date: November 17, 1995 (United States)
- Running time: 101 minutes
- Country: United States
- Language: English
- Budget: $14.5 million
- Box office: $19.5 million

It Takes Two is a 1995 American romantic comedy film directed by Andy Tennant (in his feature directorial debut) and starring Kirstie Alley, Steve Guttenberg, Mary-Kate and Ashley Olsen, Philip Bosco, and Jane Sibbett. The title is taken from the song of the same name by Marvin Gaye and Kim Weston, which is played during the closing credits. The film was produced by Rysher Entertainment, Orr & Cruickshank Productions and Dualstar Productions and distributed by Warner Bros. through their Warner Bros. Family Entertainment label. The film was released on November 17, 1995 to negative reviews from critics and grossed $19.5 million against a $14.5 million budget.

The film focuses on two lookalike girls who meet by chance in a summer camp. One is an orphan while the other a wealthy heiress. They decide to act as matchmakers for their respective parent figures. The storyline is similar to the 1881 novel, The Prince and the Pauper by Mark Twain, and to the 1949 book Lisa and Lottie by Erich Kästner. It also bears similarities to the 1961 film The Parent Trap.

== Plot ==
Nine-year-old orphan Amanda Lemmon is being sought after by Harry and Fanny Butkis, a reclusive and secretive couple known to "collect" kids via adoption. However, she wants her likeable and warm-hearted social worker, Diane Barrows, to adopt her instead. Unfortunately for Amanda, authorities will not let Diane adopt Amanda due to the former's low salary, unmarried status, and social worker position, despite her interest in doing so.

While at a summer camp, Amanda meets a rich nine-year-old girl named Alyssa Callaway who looks just like her. Alyssa has just come home from boarding school, only to find that her wealthy widowed father, Roger, the camp's owner and president of Callaway Cellular, is about to marry an overbearing, self-centered, gold-digging socialite named Clarice Kensington the following month. Amanda and Alyssa soon become acquainted, each longing for the other's life and decide to switch places. While Amanda adapts to Alyssa's wealthy lifestyle and Alyssa experiences summer camp, they get to know the other's parental figure and realize that Roger and Diane would be perfect for each other. Desperate to set them up, the girls arrange many meetings between them, hoping that they will fall in love.

Roger and Diane seem to hit it off upon meeting as she is pleasantly surprised by his kindness and humbleness despite his wealth, and Roger, with Diane's help, works up the courage to revisit the camp, which he has not done since his wife (Alyssa's mother) died due to painful memories of her untimely death when Alyssa was born.

After seeing Roger and Diane laughing and swimming together in the lake one afternoon, Clarice manipulates Roger into moving the wedding from the following month to the next day, and Amanda, while posing as Alyssa, discovers that Clarice plans to send Alyssa to boarding school in Tibet afterwards. Alyssa then ends up being adopted by the Butkises without Diane's knowledge while posing as Amanda, and the Butkises name her Betty.

A few hours before the wedding, Amanda tells the Callaways' butler, Vincenzo Campana, that she is not Alyssa. He visits Diane at the orphanage and informs her about the switch. Diane then goes to the Butkis residence to pick up the real Alyssa and get her to the wedding. However, nobody is there and a neighbor tells Diane that the only reason why the Butkises "adopted" so many kids was to work them in their salvage yard as slaves. Enraged, Diane takes Roger's company helicopter to the salvage yard to reclaim Alyssa (disguised as Amanda) and threatens to report the Butkises to social services, giving their seven other adopted children hope for salvation.

Vincenzo and Amanda try their best to stall the wedding. As Roger hesitates to say, "I do", he remembers the good times he had with Diane and realizes that he has fallen in love with her and cannot marry Clarice. Suddenly, Diane bursts into the church with Alyssa behind her. At that moment, Roger confesses his love for Diane to Clarice, who furiously slaps him. Clarice tries to do the same to "Alyssa", blaming her for ruining the wedding, but is stopped by Vincenzo.

As Clarice storms down the aisle, the real Alyssa steps out from behind Diane. Clarice declares that there is a "conspiracy", thinking that there are two Alyssas. Clarice attempts to hit the real Alyssa but Diane steps forward in time, barking "Back off, Barbie" at Clarice, before calmly informing Clarice that she has something in her teeth. Humiliated, Clarice moves to storm out of the church again, but Alyssa deliberately steps on her wedding gown, causing it to rip off. This exposes Clarice's undergarments in front of all the wedding guests, even those with cameras, causing Clarice to desperately call for her father (who just laughs) and run away, trying to hide her undergarments from the flashing cameras.

An incredulous Roger learns that Alyssa has been with Diane while he had Amanda all this time, and they realize that the girls had orchestrated their meetups all along, about which they are extremely smug. After some encouragement from the girls, Roger and Diane share their first kiss and the four of them board a horse-drawn carriage, driven by Vincenzo, to take a ride through Central Park.

== Cast ==
- Kirstie Alley as Diane Barrows, a likeable and warm-hearted social worker who takes care of the orphans at the East Side Children's Center in Manhattan. She especially loves Amanda and wants to adopt her, but does not seem qualified to do so by authorities. Amanda also especially likes her. Diane wants to find love and thinks that she might have a chance after meeting Roger.
- Steve Guttenberg as Roger Callaway, a wealthy widower who owns Camp Callaway. He also runs Callaway Cellular, a cell phone company, but he does not have a cell phone of his own because he dislikes them. Roger founded the camp with his wife, Cathy, and resides in a mansion across the lake from it. Alyssa is his only child and he wants to marry Clarice Kensington in the hopes of her becoming a new mother for Alyssa. Roger begins having doubts about marrying Clarice after meeting Diane and they click.
- Ashley Olsen as Alyssa Callaway, Roger's daughter.
- Mary-Kate Olsen as Amanda Lemmon, one of the orphans whom Diane takes care of.
- Philip Bosco as Vincenzo Campana, the Callaways' butler, best friend, and right-hand man, as well as a secondary father figure to Alyssa since the day she was born.
- Jane Sibbett as Clarice Kensington, a socialite and gold digger, the opposite of Diane. She hates baseball, and secretly, children, and intends to marry Roger only for his wealth. Clarice also convinces Roger that Alyssa is too spoiled and gets away with bad behavior.
- Ernie Grunwald and Ellen-Ray Hennessy as Harry and Fanny Butkis, Amanda's potential adoptive parents who have a biological son, Harry Jr., and seven adopted children: Bubba, Bridget, Brenda, Bonnie, Billy, Bobby, and Ben. Although she wants to be adopted, Amanda dislikes them, having heard that they "collect kids" and will "take anybody". Her aversion to them is justified, as the only reason that the Butkises "adopted" so many kids is to make them work in their salvage yard as slaves. Additionally, unless their adopted children's names start with the letter "B", the Butkises rename them. For instance, they give Amanda (actually Alyssa) the name Betty.
- Dov Tiefenbach as Harry Butkis Jr.
- Michelle Grisom as Carmen, Amanda's closest friend at the orphanage.
- Desmond Robertson as Frankie, Amanda's friend at the orphanage who makes fun of her for being chosen by the Butkises.
- Tiny Mills as Tiny
- Shanelle Henry as Patty
- Anthony Aiello as Anthony
- La Tonya Borsay as Wanda
- Michelle Lonsdale-Smith as Michelle
- Sean Orr as Jerry
- Elizabeth Walsh as Emily
- Michael Vollans as Blue Team Kid
- Paul O'Sullivan as Bernard Louffier
- Lawrence Dane as Mr. Kensington, Clarice's father
- Gerard Parkes as St. Bart's Priest
- Gina Clayton as Muffy Bilderberg
- Doug O'Keefe as Craig Bilderberg
- Mark Huisman as Waiter at Party
- Marilyn Boyle as Miss Van Dyke
- Annick Obonsawin as Brenda Butkis
- Austin Pool as Billy Butkis
- Andre Lorant as Bobby Butkis
- Vito Rezza as the Butkises' neighbor

== Awards and nominations ==
- Won – Kids' Choice Award for Favorite Movie Actress (Mary-Kate and Ashley Olsen)
- Nominated – Nickelodeon Blimp Award for Favorite Movie Actress (Kirstie Alley)
- Nominated – Young Artist Award for Best Performance by an Actress Under Ten (Ashley Olsen)
- Nominated – Young Artist Award for Best Performance by an Actress Under Ten (Mary-Kate Olsen)

== Reception ==
The film was released on November 17, 1995, in the United States and grossed $19.5 million, and made $75 million in home-video sales, making it Warner Home Video's fourth biggest seller in the family category.

The film received an 8% approval rating on review aggregator site Rotten Tomatoes, based on 24 reviews, with an average rating of 3.9/10. The site's consensus reads "Rob Base and DJ EZ Rock told us that It Takes Two to make a thing go right, but this unpleasant Olsen twins comedy proves that the opposite can also be true". At Metacritic, which assigns a weighted average score out of 100 with reviews from mainstream critics, the film received an average score of 45 based on 12 reviews, indicating "mixed or average" reviews. Audiences polled by CinemaScore gave the film an average grade of "A" on an A+ to F scale.

Kevin Thomas from Los Angeles Times called the film a predictable but fun romp. Roger Ebert called it harmless and fitfully amusing with a numbingly predictable plot and praiseworthy performances, and rated it two out of four stars.

The website Parent Previews graded the film an overall B as family-friendly, with "only a couple of bad words and a bit of child intimidation from the bad guys". Rod Gustafson from that website called it predictable with a happy ending that children can enjoy.

== See also ==
- The Parent Trap (1961 film)
- The Parent Trap (1998 film)
