= Diana Morgan (actress) =

American actress

Diana Morgan (born September 21, 1951, in Chicago, Illinois) is an actress and former television news anchor for WAVY-TV Hampton Roads, Virginia. She was the first African-American to anchor a Hampton Roads newscast. She has since been cast in numerous television shows and movies as a newscaster or television news anchor, most notably in the James Cameron film Titanic.

== Television news ==
Morgan began her career on television stints in Evansville, Indiana, Nashville, Tennessee, and Champaign, Illinois, before her arrival at WAVY-TV in Portsmouth, Virginia, in January 1981 as weeknight evening co-anchor. Morgan was first paired with co-anchor Bob Grip until 1984 when Terry Zahn replaced Bob Grip as weeknight co-anchor to Morgan. She has anchored the primetime evening newscasts on Channel 10 with newscaster Zahn for 5 1/2 years and the duo was the most-watched 11 p.m. newscast team, according to the Arbitron ratings.

Prior to a September 29, 1988, newscast, Morgan walked out of the station following a dispute about an edit on a report she had filed. Morgan left WAVY in December 1989 for WCIX in Miami, where she served as weekend news anchor, later becoming the weekday evening anchor until she left WCIX in 1994.

== Acting ==
After taking theatre and acting lessons, Morgan did local theatre for a time in Chicago. She later moved to Hollywood where she has been mostly cast as a news reporter or anchor in movie and television roles. Morgan has appeared on JAG, The Young and the Restless, Days of Our Lives and The Bold and the Beautiful. She has also done roles on television programs such as Babylon 5 and The West Wing. In Babylon 5, she played the recurring role of Alison Higgins, the anchor for ISN News. Morgan has portrayed newscasters in Eraser, Billboard Dad and most notably, James Cameron's Titanic, her news anchor voice over, prominent in the opening credits.

== Selected credits ==
- Eraser (1996)
- Murder One (TV series) (1996)
- Pauly (TV series) (1997)
- Babylon 5 (TV series) (1996–1997)
- Brooklyn South (TV series) (1997)
- Titanic (1997)
- JAG (TV series) (1998)
- The Last Man on Planet Earth (TV movie) (1999)
- Running Mates (TV movie) (2000)
- The Tick (TV series) (2002)
- The West Wing (TV series) (1999-2002)
- The Agency (TV series) (2002)
- Monster Man (TV series) (2003)
- Saving Grace (TV series) (2008)
- The Bold and the Beautiful (TV series) (2004–2011)
- The Mentalist (TV series) (2010–2011)
