= Mary-Kate and Ashley Olsen =

American child actresses and fashion designers (born 1986)

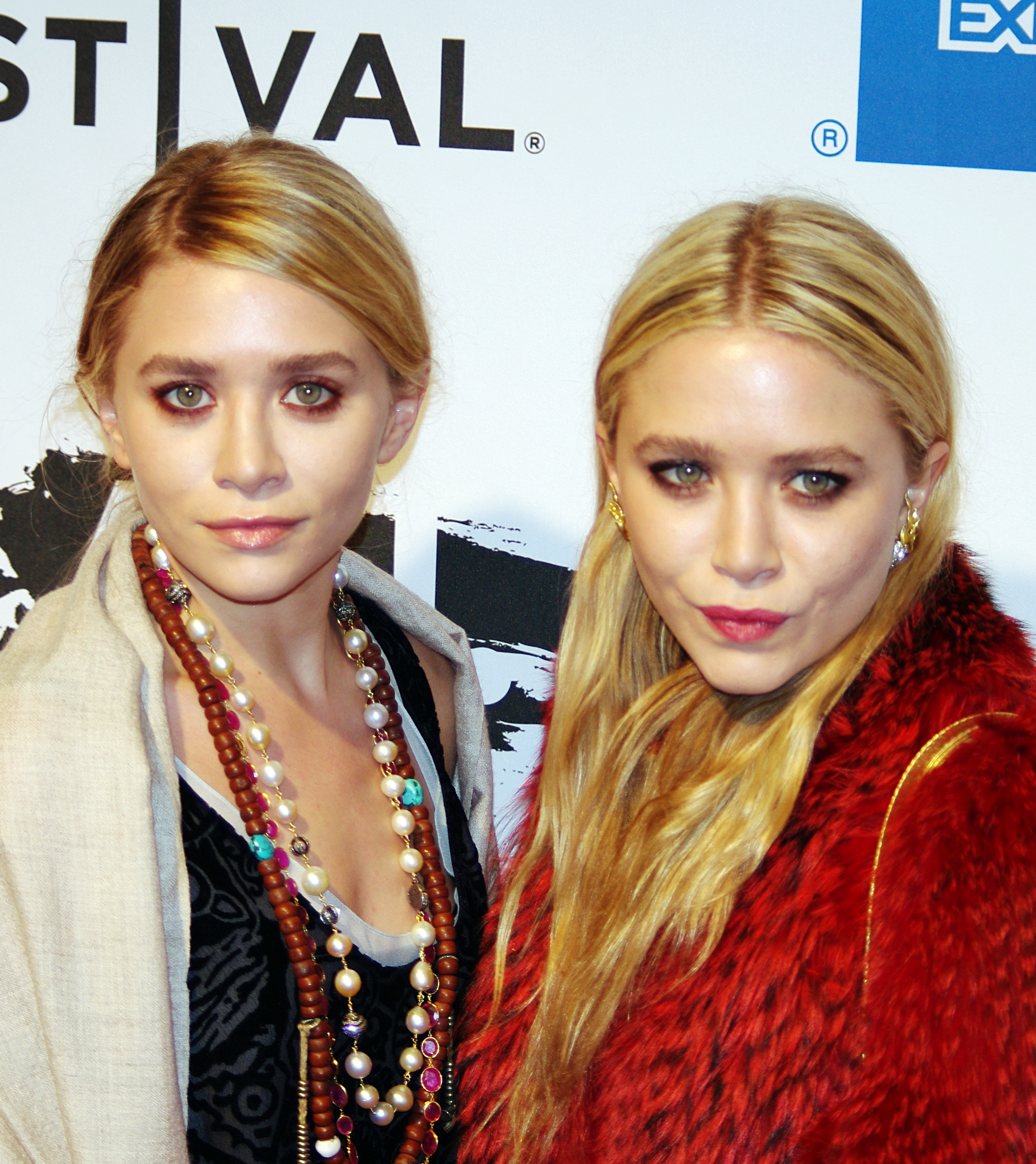
- Ashley (left) and Mary-Kate (right) at the 2011 Tribeca Film Festival
- Born: Mary-Kate Olsen; Ashley Fuller Olsen; June 13, 1986 (age 40); Los Angeles, California, U.S.
- Occupations: Fashion designers; actresses
- Years active: Ashley: 1987–2004 (actress); Mary-Kate: 1987–2012 (actress); Both: 2004–present (fashion design)
- Spouses: Mary-Kate: Olivier Sarkozy (m. 2015; div. 2021); Ashley: Louis Eisner (m. 2022)
- Children: Ashley: 1
- Relatives: Elizabeth Olsen (sister)

Mary-Kate Olsen and Ashley Fuller Olsen (born June 13, 1986), also known as the Olsen twins, are American fashion designers and former actresses. Mary-Kate and Ashley made their acting debut as infants playing Michelle Tanner on the television sitcom Full House (1987–1995). As they grew older, they began starring in other television shows, films, and media through their own production company, Dualstar. The fraternal twins became preteen icons, and some of the wealthiest women in the entertainment industry at a young age.

The Olsens stepped away from acting in the mid-2000s and entered the fashion design industry. They founded their own luxury fashion label in 2006, The Row, based in New York City. They have won several awards from the Council of Fashion Designers of America (CFDA).

== Lives and career ==
=== Childhood and acting career ===
The twins were born in Sherman Oaks, Los Angeles, to David "Dave" Olsen and Jarnette "Jarnie" (née Jones). Ashley is two minutes older than Mary-Kate. They have an older brother and a younger sister, actress Elizabeth, as well as a half-sister and a half-brother from their father's second marriage. The twins' parents divorced in 1995. The Olsen twins have Danish and Norwegian ancestry.

In 1987, at the age of six months, the twins were cast in the role of Michelle Tanner on the ABC sitcom Full House. They began filming at nine months old, taking turns playing the role. The Olsens continued to portray Michelle throughout the show's run, which concluded in 1995.

In 1992, Mary-Kate and Ashley shared the role of Michelle Tanner when they guest-starred on the Full House crossover episode of Hangin' with Mr. Cooper. While starring on Full House, the Olsens also began appearing (as separate characters) in films for video and television. The first such film, To Grandmother's House We Go, debuted in 1992 and featured cameos from several other Full House actors. In 1993, the Olsens established the company Dualstar, which produced the twins' subsequent films and videos, including 1993's Double, Double, Toil and Trouble and 1994's How the West Was Fun. On May 9, 1993, Mary-Kate and Ashley performed alongside Shelley Duvall and Daryl Hannah in a benefit concert to raise money for the Rainforest. A series of musical mystery videos called The Adventures of Mary-Kate & Ashley premiered in 1994 and continued through 1997.

In 1995, following the end of Full House, the Olsens made their feature film debut in It Takes Two, co-starring Steve Guttenberg and Kirstie Alley. That same year, they introduced a second video series, You're Invited to Mary-Kate & Ashley's..., which continued to release new entries until 2000.

In 1996, the Olsens appeared in an episode of All My Children. In 1997, they appeared as guest stars in an episode of Sister Sister. In 1998, the twins returned to series television with another ABC sitcom, Two of a Kind, co-starring Christopher Sieber as their characters' widowed father. The series lasted only one season but aired in reruns on cable for several years afterward. 1998 also saw the release of Billboard Dad, the first of a new string of direct-to-video films starring the Olsens. The final such film, The Challenge, debuted in 2003.

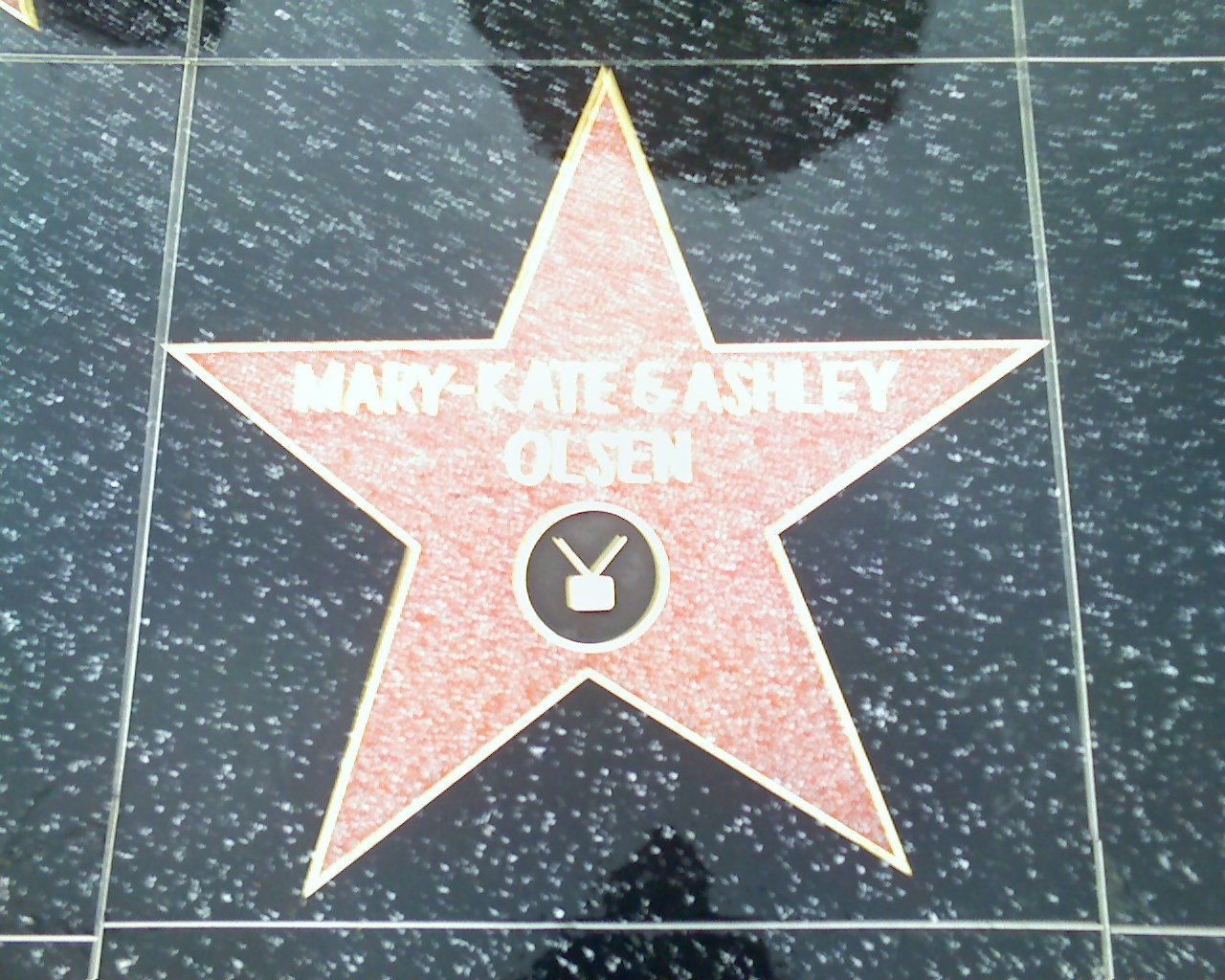
Mary-Kate and Ashley Olsen's Hollywood Star

In 2000, the Olsens appeared in an episode of 7th Heaven as bad girls Sue and Carol Murphy. The following year, the sisters starred in two new series: So Little Time, a live-action sitcom on Fox Family (later ABC Family); and Mary-Kate and Ashley in Action!, an animated series airing Saturday mornings on ABC. Both shows were canceled after one season, although Mary-Kate received a Daytime Emmy Award nomination for her performance on So Little Time.

In early 2004, the Olsens had a cameo voice role in an episode of The Simpsons as the readers of Marge's book-on-tape, The Harpooned Heart. That same year, the twins starred in a second feature film, New York Minute. It was their last film together, as well as Ashley's last acting role. Mary-Kate has continued to appear in film and television. Mary-Kate and Ashley had a fan club until 2000, "Mary-Kate & Ashley's Fun Club", where fans would pay to receive Mary-Kate and Ashley collectibles and photos. Each subscription included an issue of Our Funzine, Mary-Kate and Ashley's fan club magazine, exclusively available through the club, and a collectibles catalog, where one could purchase T-shirts, posters, baseball caps, key rings, school folders, postcards, and various other items. Subscribers also received "surprise gifts" (usually key rings, book excerpts, or back issues of the Funzine), lyric sheets to Mary-Kate and Ashley's songs, a school folder, a membership card, a full-sized poster, two black and white photos (one of each girl), and a color photo with reprint autographs. The club was advertised at the beginning of Mary-Kate and Ashley movies until 1998. Mary-Kate and Ashley were popular figures in the preteen market during the late 1990s and early 2000s. Their names and likenesses extended not only to movies and videos, but to clothes, shoes, purses, hats, books, CDs and cassette tapes, fragrances and makeup, magazines, video and board games, dolls, posters, calendars, and even telephones and CD players—with a market share made up mostly of the tween demographic. Mattel produced various sets of Mary-Kate and Ashley fashion dolls from 2000 to 2005, along with separate outfits and accessory packs.

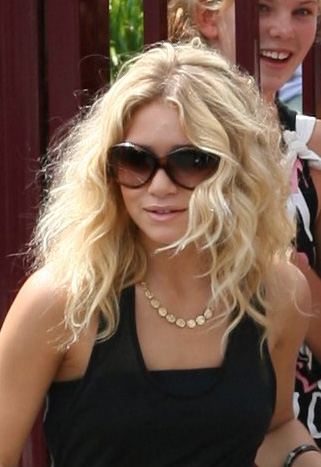
Ashley Olsen in Australia in 2006

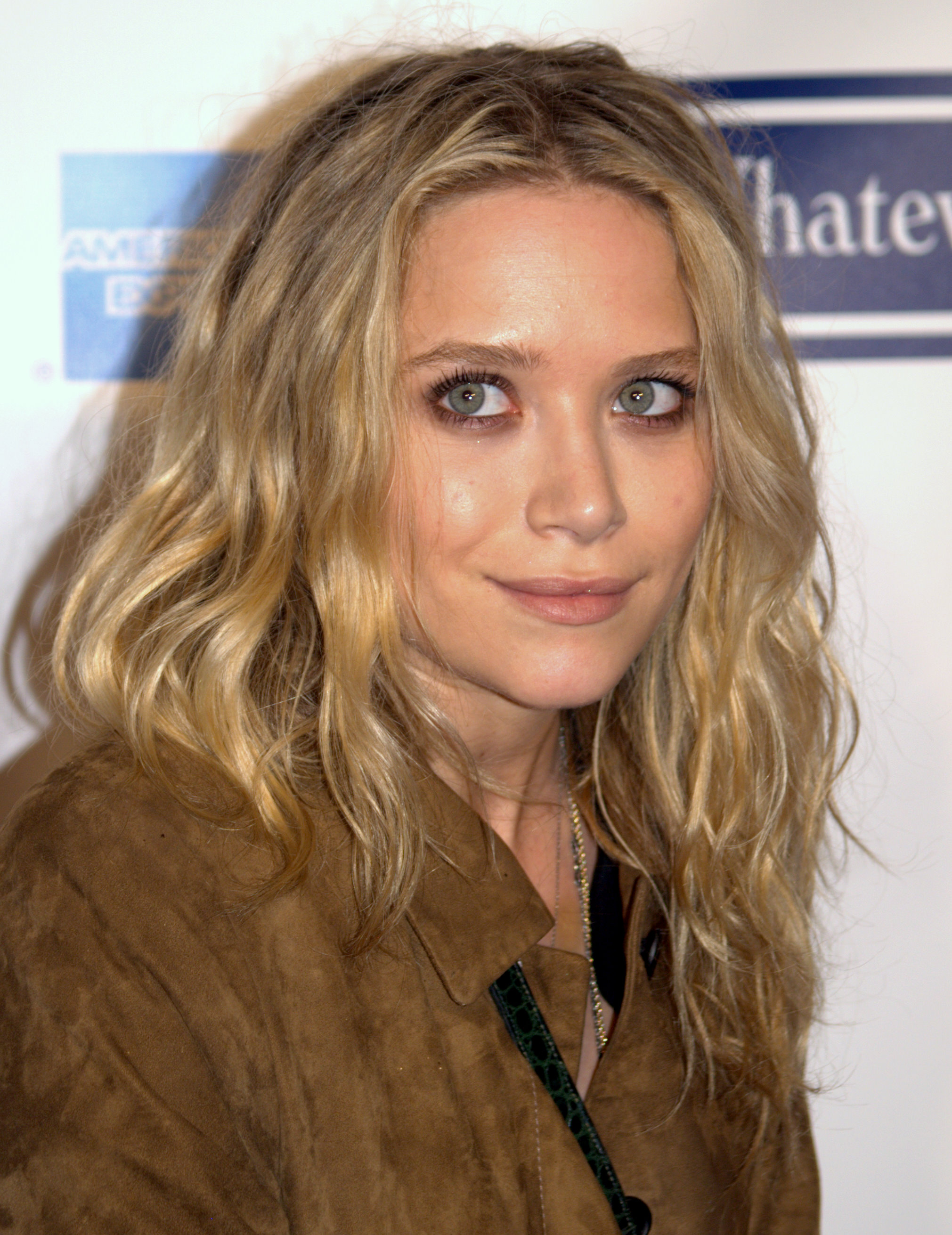
Mary-Kate Olsen at the premiere of Whatever Works in 2009

The sisters became co-presidents of Dualstar on their 18th birthday in 2004. Upon taking control of the company, Mary-Kate and Ashley made moves to secure the future of the company by releasing products that appealed to the teen market, including home decoration and fragrances. The Dualstar brand has been sold in more than 3,000 stores in the United States and over 5,300 stores worldwide. The Olsens have appeared on the Forbes "Celebrity 100" list since 2002; in 2007, Forbes ranked them (collectively) as the eleventh-richest women in entertainment, with an estimated net worth of US$100 million.

The sisters retired from acting in 2012, expressing interest in the fashion industry. When Fuller House, a spin-off of the original sitcom Full House, was announced, the sisters were the only members of the original cast who did not return to play their character, Michelle. They received harsh criticism due to their absence, but it was later revealed that John Stamos, who played Michelle's uncle, Jesse Katsopolis, was to blame for their refusal to return, when he reached out to their agent instead of directly to the sisters. Mary-Kate considered joining again, and offered to persuade Ashley to join as well, but Stamos, who also produced Fuller House, "didn't seize the opportunity and everything fell apart." The sisters' new fashion career was also a factor in their failure to return, as they had moved away from acting and toward fashion designing. It was speculated that the twins' younger sister, actress Elizabeth Olsen, took up the role as Michelle, but the team that produced Fuller House was uninterested, and Michelle never made it onto the show.

=== Fashion career ===
As the sisters have matured, they expressed greater interest in their fashion choices, with The New York Times declaring Mary-Kate a fashion icon for pioneering her signature "homeless" look. The style sometimes referred to by fashion journalists as "ashcan" or "bohemian-bourgeois", is similar to the boho-chic style popularized in Britain by Kate Moss and Sienna Miller. The look consists of oversized sunglasses, boots, loose sweaters, and flowing skirts, with an aesthetic of mixing high-end and low-end pieces. The twins were tapped as the faces of upscale fashion line Badgley Mischka in 2006.

The last logo used for the sisters' collective brand.

The Olsens had a clothing line for girls ages 4–14 in Wal-Mart stores across North America, as well as a beauty line called "Mary-Kate and Ashley: Real fashion for real girls". In 2004, they made news by signing a pledge to allow full maternity leave to all the workers that sew their line of clothing in Bangladesh. The National Labor Committee, which organized the pledge, praised the twins for their commitment to worker rights.

The Olsens have also launched their own couture fashion label, The Row, named after Savile Row in London. In 2007, they launched Elizabeth & James, a contemporary collection inspired by many of their unique vintage finds and pieces in their personal wardrobes. They have also released a women's clothing line for J.C. Penney, called Olsenboye, and a T-shirt line called "StyleMint". In 2008, the sisters published the book Influence, a compilation of interviews with many of the most prominent people in the field of fashion. In August 2013, the twins launched a new fashion line in Oslo, Norway. The Olsens were first named Womenswear Designer of the Year by the Council of Fashion Designers of America (CFDA) for The Row in 2012. They received the award again in 2015. The CFDA also named the Olsens Accessories Designer of the Year in 2014 for their work with The Row.

== Filmography ==
This filmography is of the twins as a duo. See Mary-Kate Olsen for other productions in which she has appeared.

Television and film
Year(s)	Title	Mary-Kate's role	Ashley's role	Notes
1987–1995	Full House	Michelle Tanner (shared role)		191 episodes
1992	Hangin' with Mr. Cooper	Michelle Tanner (shared role)		Episode: "Hangin' with Michelle"
1992	To Grandmother's House We Go	Sarah Thompson	Julie Thompson	Television film
1993	Our First Video	Herself	Herself	Direct-to-video release
1993	Double, Double, Toil and Trouble	Kelly Farmer and Young Aunt Sophia	Lynn Farmer and Young Aunt Agatha	Television film
1994	How the West Was Fun	Jessica Martin	Suzy Martin	Television film
1994	The Little Rascals	Twin #2	Twin #1	Cameo role
1994–1997	The Adventures of Mary-Kate & Ashley	Herself	Herself	Video series, 11 videos
1995	It Takes Two	Amanda Lemmon	Alyssa Callaway	
1995–2000	You're Invited to Mary-Kate & Ashley's	Herself	Herself	Video series, 10 videos
1997	Sister, Sister	Herself	Herself	Episode: "Slime Party"
1997	Our Music Video	Herself	Herself	Direct-to-video release
1998	Billboard Dad	Tess Tyler	Emily Tyler	
1998	All My Children	Herself	Herself	Episode dated October 29, 1998
1998–1999	Two of a Kind	Mary-Kate Burke	Ashley Burke	1 season
1999	Passport to Paris	Melanie "Mel" Porter	Allyson "Ally" Porter	
1999	Switching Goals	Sam Stanton	Emma Stanton	Television film
2000	7th Heaven	Carol Murphy	Sue Murphy	Episode: "Gossip"
2000	Our Lips Are Sealed	Maddie Parker	Abby Parker	
2001	Mary-Kate & Ashley's Fashion Forward	Herself	Herself	Direct-to-video release
2001	Winning London	Chloe Lawrence	Riley Lawrence	
2001–2002	So Little Time	Riley Carlson	Chloe Carlson	1 season
2001	Holiday in the Sun	Madison Stewart	Alex Stewart	
2001–2002	Mary-Kate and Ashley in Action!	Misty (voice)	Amber (voice)	Animated series, 1 season
2002	Getting There	Kylie Hunter	Taylor Hunter	
2002	When in Rome	Charli Hunter	Leila Hunter	
2003	The Challenge	Shane Dalton	Elizabeth "Lizzie" Dalton	
2003	Charlie's Angels: Full Throttle	Future Angel (shared role)		Uncredited cameo
2004	The Simpsons	Herself (voice)	Herself (voice)	Episode: "Diatribe of a Mad Housewife"
2004	New York Minute	Roxanne "Roxy" Ryan	Jane Ryan	Main roles
2004	Saturday Night Live	Herself	Herself	Guest hosts; episode: "Mary-Kate & Ashley Olsen/J-Kwon"

== Discography ==
=== Studio albums ===
List of studio albums, with selected chart positions
Title	Album details	Peak chart positions	
Title	Album details	US Kids	US
Brother for Sale	Released: October 30, 1992; Label: BMG Kidz; Formats: CD, Cassette	—	—
I Am the Cute One	Released: September 28, 1993; Label: BMG Kidz; Formats: CD, Cassette	25	149
Give Us a Mystery	Released: September 13, 1994; Label: BMG Kidz; Formats: CD, Cassette	24	—

Soundtrack appearances
Year	Song	Soundtrack / album
2001	"Island in the Sun" (Performed by Empty Trash featuring Mary-Kate and Ashley)	Holiday in the Sun
2004	"Suffragette City" (Performed by Wakefield featuring Mary-Kate and Ashley)	New York Minute

=== Audiobooks ===
Audiobooks
Year(s)	Title	Author	Role	Notes
1993	The Great Big Terrible Mess	Louis Phillips	Narrator	
1993	How to Ride a Rhinoceros	Louis Phillips	Narrator	

== Awards and nominations ==
Award	Year (Note: Indicates the year of ceremony. Each year is linked to the article about the awards held that year, wherever possible.)	Recipient(s) and nominee(s)	Category	Result
Accessories Council Excellence Awards	2005	Olsen Twins	ACE Award	Won
Bravo Otto	2004	Olsen Twins	Best Actress	Won
Bravo Otto	2004	Olsen Twins	Best Female TV Star	Nominated
CfDA Fashion Awards	2012	The Row	Womenswear Designer of the Year	Won
CfDA Fashion Awards	2014	The Row	Accessories Designer of the Year	Won
CfDA Fashion Awards	2015	The Row	Accessories Designer of the Year	Nominated
CfDA Fashion Awards	2015	The Row	Womenswear Designer of the Year	Won
CfDA Fashion Awards	2016	The Row	Womenswear Designer of the Year	Nominated
CfDA Fashion Awards	2016	The Row	Accessories Designer of the Year	Nominated
CfDA Fashion Awards	2017	The Row	Accessories Designer of the Year	Nominated
CfDA Fashion Awards	2017	The Row	Womenswear Designer of the Year	Nominated
CfDA Fashion Awards	2018	The Row	Womenswear Designer of the Year	Nominated
CfDA Fashion Awards	2018	The Row	Accessories Designer of the Year	Won
CfDA Fashion Awards	2019	The Row	Accessories Designer of the Year	Won
CfDA Fashion Awards	2020	The Row	American Womenswear Designer of the Year	Nominated
CfDA Fashion Awards	2020	The Row	American Accessories Designer of the Year	Nominated
CfDA Fashion Awards	2021	The Row	American Accessories Designer of the Year	Nominated
Daytime Emmy Awards	2002	So Little Time (for Mary-Kate)	Outstanding Performer in a Children's Series	Nominated
DVD Exclusive Awards	2003	Olsen Twins	Franchise Performers Award	Won
Elle Style Awards	2010	Olsen Twins	Style Icons of 2010	Won
Golden Raspberry Awards	2005	New York Minute	Worst Actress	Nominated
Golden Raspberry Awards	2005	New York Minute	Worst Screen Couple	Nominated
Hollywood Walk of Fame	2004	Olsen Twins	Hollywood Walk of Fame Star	Won
Kids' Choice Awards	1996	It Takes Two	Favorite Movie Actress	Won
Kids' Choice Awards	1999	It Takes Two	Favorite TV Actress	Won
Stinkers Bad Movie Awards	2004	New York Minute	Worst Actress	Nominated
Stinkers Bad Movie Awards	2004	New York Minute	Worst On-Screen Couple	Nominated
Teen Choice Awards	2004	New York Minute	Choice Movie Blush	Nominated
The Wall Street Journal	2012	The Row	Innovator of the Year: Fashion	Won
Young Artist Awards	1989	Full House	Best Young Actor/Actress – Under Five Years of Age	Won
Young Artist Awards	1990	Full House	Outstanding Performance by an Actress Under Nine Years of Age	Won
Young Artist Awards	1992	Full House	Exceptional Performance by a Young Actress Under Ten	Won
Young Artist Awards	1994	Double, Double, Toil and Trouble	Best Youth Actress in a TV Mini-Series, M.O.W. or Special	Won
Young Artist Awards	1996	It Takes Two	Best Performance by an Actress Under Ten – Feature Film	Nominated

== See also ==
- List of twins
