= Musaeum Clausum =

Tract by Thomas Browne

Musaeum Clausum (Latin for Sealed Museum), also known as Bibliotheca abscondita (Secret Library in Latin), is a tract written by Sir Thomas Browne which was first published posthumously in 1684. The tract contains short sentence descriptions of supposed, rumoured or lost books, pictures, and objects. The subtitle describes the tract as an inventory of remarkable books, antiquities, pictures and rarities of several kinds, scarce or never seen by any man now living. Its date is unknown: however, an event from the year 1673 is cited.

== Influence from Rabelais ==
Like his Pseudodoxia Epidemica, Musaeum Clausum is a catalogue of doubts and queries, only this time, in a style which anticipates the 20th-century Argentinian short-story writer Jorge Luis Borges, who once declared: "To write vast books is a laborious nonsense; much better is to offer a summary as if those books actually existed."

Browne however was not the first author to engage in such fantasy. The French author Rabelais, in his epic Gargantua and Pantagruel, also penned a list of imaginary and often obscene book titles in his "Library of Pantagruel", an inventory which Browne himself alludes to in his Religio Medici.

== Connections to the antiquarian collections ==
As the 17th-century Scientific Revolution progressed the popularity and growth of antiquarian collections, those claiming to house highly improbable items grew. Browne was an avid collector of antiquities and natural specimens, possessing a supposed unicorn's horn, presented to him by Arthur Dee. Browne's eldest son Edward visited the famous scholar Athanasius Kircher, founder of the Museo Kircherano at Rome in 1667, whose exhibits included an engine for attempting perpetual motion and a speaking head, which Kircher called his Oraculum Delphinium. He wrote to his father of his visit to the Jesuit priest's "closet of rarities".

== Reception ==
The sheer volume of book-titles, pictures and objects listed in Musaeum Clausum is testimony to Browne's fertile imagination. However, his major editors, Simon Wilkin in the nineteenth century (1834) and Sir Geoffrey Keynes in the twentieth (1924), summarily dismissed it. Keynes considered its humour too erudite and "not to everyone's taste".

== Status as a parody ==
Browne's miscellaneous tract may also be read as a parody of the rising trend of private museum collections with their curios of doubtful origin, and perhaps also of publications such as the so-called Museum Hermeticum (1678), one of the last great anthologies of alchemical literature, with their divulging of near common-place alchemical concepts and symbols.

== See also ==
- Fictional book
