= Lady Dorothy Browne and Sir Thomas Browne =

Painting attributed to Joan Carlile

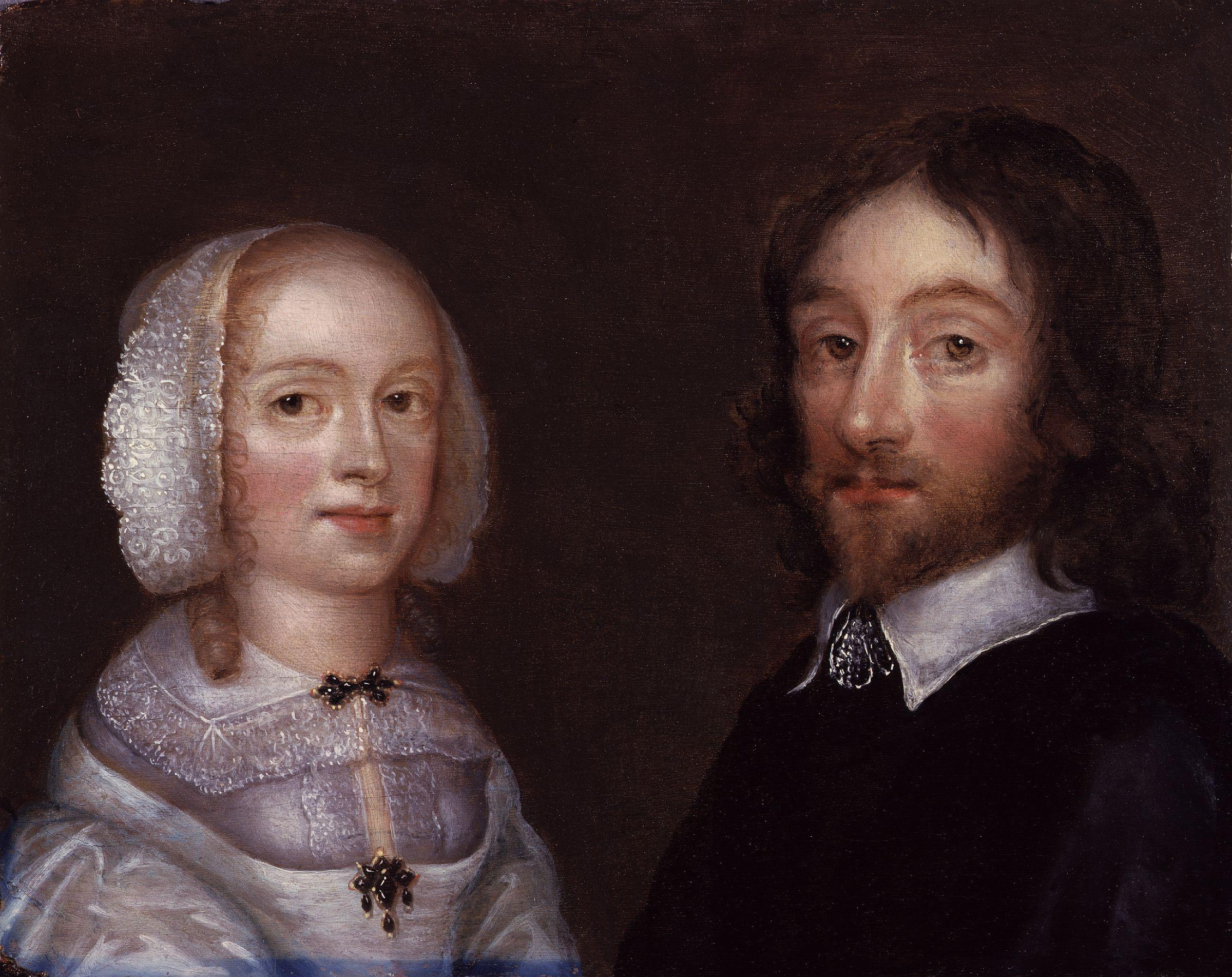
- Artist: Joan Carlile
- Year: c. 1641–1650
- Catalogue: NPG 2062
- Medium: oil on panel
- Dimensions: 18.4 cm × 22.9 cm (7.2 in × 9.0 in)
- Location: National Portrait Gallery, London

Lady Dorothy Browne and Sir Thomas Browne is an oil on panel painting attributed to the English artist Joan Carlile, and probably completed between 1641 and 1650. The painting depicts English physician Thomas Browne and his wife Dorothy.

== Subjects ==
Sir Thomas Browne (1605–1682), the son of Thomas Browne, a silk merchant from Upton, Cheshire, and Anne Browne, the daughter of Paul Garraway of Sussex, was born in the parish of St Michael, Cheapside, in London on 19 October 1605. His father died while he was still young and he was sent to school at Winchester College. In 1623 Browne went to the University of Oxford. He graduated from Pembroke College, Oxford in 1626, after which he studied medicine at Padua and Montpellier universities, completing his studies at Leiden, where he received a medical degree in 1633. He settled in Norwich in 1637 and practised medicine there until his death in 1682. He was noted for the literary works Religio Medici (The Religion of a Physician) and Hydriotaphia, Urn Burial. His wife, Lady Browne (née Dorothy Mileham, 1621–1685), came from a landed family in the Norfolk town of Burlingham St Peter. She was described by family friend John Whitefoot as "a lady of such a symmetrical proportion to her worthy husband, both in the graces of her body and mind, that they seemed to come together by a kind of natural magnetism". The couple married in 1641.

== Description ==
The two Brownes are portrayed in contrasting styles. Lady Browne, dressed with two brooches and a headpiece, is looking directly at the viewer with a pleasant expression. Sir Thomas, on the other hand, appears to be staring into the distance. He is dressed in black with a white collar. American professor Reid Barbour has likened the pair to the pastoral poems of John Milton, with Lady Browne representing the upbeat L'Allegro while Sir Thomas is the serious Il Penseroso. Barbour nonetheless described the two as complementing each other. There are no books or symbols visible in the painting.

The painting is 184 by 229 millimetres (7.2 in × 9.0 in) in size, and has been in the permanent collection of the National Portrait Gallery, London since 1924 under the catalogue number NPG 2062.
