= I Will Follow You into the Dark =

2005 single by Death Cab for Cutie

Single by Death Cab for Cutie

from the album Plans
- Released: July 17, 2006
- Recorded: Spring 2005 at Long View Farm in North Brookfield, Massachusetts
- Genre: Acoustic; folk; emo
- Length: 3:09
- Label: Atlantic
- Songwriter: Ben Gibbard
- Producer: Chris Walla

Death Cab for Cutie singles chronology
"Crooked Teeth" (2006)	"I Will Follow You into the Dark" (2006)	"I Will Possess Your Heart" (2008)

Audio sample
- I Will Follow You into the Dark: file; help

"I Will Follow You into the Dark" is a song by American rock band Death Cab for Cutie, the third single from their fifth album, Plans (2005), released on July 17, 2006.

Written and performed by Ben Gibbard, it is an acoustic solo ballad, and was recorded in monaural with a single microphone and little editing.

The single was released on Atlantic Records, becoming one of Death Cab for Cutie's lowest-charting singles, peaking number 28 on the Modern Rock Tracks, number 66 on the UK Singles Chart and failing to chart on the Billboard Hot 100; however, "I Will Follow You into the Dark" was certified as double platinum by the Recording Industry Association of America, and is the band's best-selling single to date. Despite charting lower than other singles, the single is still one of the band's most played songs on commercial radio stations. The song's popularity has led it to be featured in various television shows and movies and be covered by numerous artists.

== Background ==
The song was written entirely by Death Cab for Cutie's lead singer and guitarist Ben Gibbard.

Nearing age 29, Gibbard had never lost anyone really special in his life. Growing older during an ideal and comfortable time of his life led him to begin obsessing over death, the afterlife, and the weight of his relationships. He started to take stock of the importance of the people in his life and felt a need to say something about it, writing the song to deal with his problems of focusing on life by expanding his scope to include death and what comes afterward.

"It's just this idea that what if somebody dies and we're just floating, just stumbling around in infinite darkness, and I'm just trying to find some kind of spiritual kind of peace with myself, and the world."

— Ben Gibbard

== Recording ==
Originally planned to be recorded later in the sessions for Plans, technical issues arose with one set of headphones while tracking the vocals for a different song. Producer and guitarist Chris Walla told Gibbard to take a break while the issues were being addressed. Gibbard picked up his guitar and began playing "I Will Follow You into the Dark", which was still going through the vocal microphone. Walla was impressed by the sound, leading him to suggest they do a quick tracking of the performance. It was this mono recording, with the only editing being mild compression and de-essing, that was eventually featured on the album and released as a single. Due to the impromptu nature of the recording, the vocals on the track are mixed louder than the guitar, and Gibbard's breathing can be heard at the start of the song.

== Music videos ==
The music video, filmed in Romania and directed by Jamie Thraves, features Ben Gibbard in a small sparsely decorated apartment, playing the song while sitting on his bed. The video premiered on June 6, 2006 via Yahoo! Music and the bands website.

== Release ==
"I Will Follow You into the Dark" has two separate United Kingdom-exclusive, colored vinyl 7" releases with B-sides recorded as part of the band's Rolling Stone originals session. The part-one release is printed on teal vinyl with "Photobooth" from The Forbidden Love EP as the B-side, and the part-two release is printed on clear orange vinyl with a B-side of "Brothers on a Hotel Bed". The CD single was also only released in the UK and contains the same "Brothers on a Hotel Bed" B-side.

== Reception ==
=== Critical reception ===
Critical response to "I Will Follow You into the Dark" was generally positive. In their reviews for the album Plans, Robert Christgau selected the song as his "choice cut", Pitchfork Media called it the album's "quiet centerpiece" and praised its "unexpected turns of phrase", PopMatters called it "one of the best written pop songs of the year – if not of the past five years", and Tiny Mix Tapes stated that it was "one of the band's best songs to date." Rolling Stone however said that the song "demonstrates how wise Gibbard is to let the band mess with his pristine melodies, which would sound wispy and ignorable on their own."

The song was nominated for the 2007 Grammy Award for Best Pop Performance by a Duo or Group with Vocals, but lost to "My Humps" by the Black Eyed Peas. By being nominated in this category, instead of for Best Male Pop Vocal Performance, it credited the entire band for Gibbard's solo performance.

=== Commercial reception ===
The song achieved double-platinum certification from the Recording Industry Association of America on June 2, 2022, for over 2,000,000 sales. "I Will Follow You into the Dark" became Death Cab for Cutie's best-selling single to date, and their overall second best-selling release after the album Plans itself. The song was also certified in Canada, gold in New Zealand, and silver in the United Kingdom.

== Usage in the media ==
"I Will Follow You into the Dark" was featured on the soundtrack of the 2007 film The Invisible, a remake of the 2002 Swedish film Den Osynlige. In 2008 it was featured in the television series 90210, in the episode "That Which We Destroy". The song was featured in the sitcom Scrubs, in the season eight episode entitled "My Last Words", first broadcast in January 2009. The same year it was also the title of an episode of Grey's Anatomy in the fifth season, originally airing in March 2009. It was used in the 2011 Nikita episode "Into the Dark" (of which it was also the namesake), and was also used in the film Friends With Benefits the same year. An instrumental version of the song was featured in the 2011 film Crazy, Stupid, Love. The song was also used for the end credits of Mike Birbiglia's Netflix comedy special My Girlfriend's Boyfriend.

The 2012 film Into the Dark, originally titled I Will Follow You Into the Dark, derives its name from the song.

The book series, "ghostgirl", references the song in the books.

A parody of the song, entitled "I Will Follow You into the Abyss of Death", is featured in the 2007 film Alvin and the Chipmunks. In the movie, protagonist Dave Seville (Jason Lee) pitches the tune to record company executive Ian Hawke (David Cross), who pans it after hearing only a few seconds, and then encourages Seville to abandon his songwriting career.

Episode 6 of Season 3 of After Life by Ricky Gervais features the song.

Episode 7 of Season 1 of Tell Me Lies features the song.

== Charts ==
Chart (2006)	Peak position
Canada Rock (Billboard)	44
Scottish Singles Sales (Official Charts)	42
UK Singles (Official Charts)	66
UK Rock & Metal (Official Charts)	6
US Adult Pop Airplay (Billboard)	34
US Alternative Airplay (Billboard)	28

== Certifications ==
Region	Certification	Certified units/sales
Canada (Music Canada)	Platinum	80,000^{‡}
New Zealand (RMNZ)	Gold	15,000^{‡}
United Kingdom (BPI)	Silver	200,000^{‡}
United States (RIAA)	2× Platinum	2,000,000^{‡}
^{‡} Sales+streaming figures based on certification alone.

== Notable cover versions ==
Amanda Palmer of The Dresden Dolls recorded a cover of the song during the recording sessions for Who Killed Amanda Palmer. It appears on the limited edition 'Alternate Tracks' release as well as a Brainwashed Records compilation entitled 'Peace (for mom)'. She also performed the song at a concert held in Vancouver, British Columbia, Canada on a tour in November 2011 for what would become the album An Evening With Neil Gaiman & Amanda Palmer, in tribute to the overdose death of a young woman at Occupy Vancouver two days earlier.

Amy Millan (also known as member of Stars and Broken Social Scene) released her version of the song on her second solo album, Masters of the Burial, in 2009. Pitchfork described her version as "one of the most enduring... Milan's sleepy rendition, with its half-formulated harmonies, over-mannered pedal steel, and microwaved guitar licks, makes the original sound like Sleater-Kinney in comparison."
