= Aaron Beebe =

American artist and curator

Aaron G. Beebe is an American artist and curator working in Brooklyn, New York. He was the Director of the Coney Island Museum, is a co-founder of the Morbid Anatomy Museum and is the creator of the Congress for Curious People.

Beebe was born in Lakewood, Ohio, and attended Ohio State University and New York University.

During his tenure at the Coney Island Museum, Beebe produced several collaborative installations. In fact, Beebe has said that he views museums themselves as a type of installation work. Notable work at the Coney Island Museum included:

- "Postcards from Paradise" - A humorous work about the history of mailed images and texts, featuring a working post office and postmaster. With performance artist Martha Wilson.
- "The Coney Island Amateur Psychoanalytic Society and it's Circle" - An installation by Zoe Belloff.
- "The Great Coney Island Spectacularium" - A reproduction of a 19th-century dime museum that used the original, 19th century, collection of the former Niagara Falls Museum to cross-examine the history of spectacle and dime museums. With Joanna Ebenstein.
- "The Cosmorama of the Great Dreamland Fire" - an immersive installation that recreated a 19th-century panoramic painting of the destruction of Coney Island's largest amusement park in 1911.

In 2014, Beebe worked with Joanna Ebenstein, Tracy Hurley Martin, Tonya Martin, and Colin Dickey to co-found the Morbid Anatomy Museum. The museum was the result of a confluence of interests and ideas that the five held, and Beebe's experience in Coney Island provided the structural know-how to create a new institution. He then oversaw the design and construction of the museum (designed by Robert Kirkbride and Anthony Cohn) and helped produce the first exhibitions there.
