= So Little Time =

American television sitcom (2001–2002)

- The So Little Time cast (from left to right): Clare Carey, Ashley Olsen, Taylor Negron, Mary-Kate Olsen and Eric Lutes.
- Created by: Eric Cohen; Tonya Hurley
- Starring: Mary-Kate Olsen; Ashley Olsen; Eric Lutes; Clare Carey; Jesse Head; Natashia Williams; Taylor Negron
- Theme music composer: Ollie Jacobs; James Barnett; Lalo Creme
- Opening theme: "So Little Time" by Arkarna
- Ending theme: "So Little Time"
- Country of origin: United States
- Original language: English
- No. of seasons: 1
- No. of episodes: 26

Production
- Executive producers: Eric Cohen; Robert Thorne; Mary-Kate Olsen; Ashley Olsen; Mark Blutman
- Camera setup: Videotape; Single/Multi-camera
- Running time: 22 minutes
- Production company: Dualstar Productions

Original release
- Network: Fox Family (2001); ABC Family (2001–2002)
- Release: June 2, 2001 – May 4, 2002

So Little Time is an American sitcom starring Mary-Kate and Ashley Olsen in their third and final television sitcom (after Full House and Two of a Kind).

It aired on Fox Family: the first half of the series aired from June 2 to August 18, 2001, and the series then went on a four-month hiatus owing to network management changes. By December 2001, Fox Family had become ABC Family, and the remaining episodes aired from December 1, 2001, until May 4, 2002.

== Premise ==
Chloe and Riley Carlson are twin sisters living in Malibu, California. Their fashion designer parents Macy and Jake are separated, living with their mom and their flamboyant, wise-cracking nanny Manuelo, while their dad is living in a trailer park a few miles away. Riley has the romantic affection of Larry Slotnick, the Carlson's wacky next-door neighbor.

== Cast and characters ==
=== Main cast ===
- Mary-Kate Olsen as Riley Carlson
- Ashley Olsen as Chloe Carlson
- Eric Lutes as Jake Carlson
- Clare Carey as Macy Carlson
- Jesse Head as Spartacus Lawrence "Larry" Slotnick
- Natashia Williams as Tedi
- Taylor Negron as Manuelo Del Valle

=== Recurring cast ===
- Amy Davidson as Cammie Morton
- Wendy Worthington as Ellen Westmore
- Ben Easter as Lennon Kincaid
- Todd Susman as Ed
- Robert Hegyes as Vice Principal Connor

=== Notable guest stars ===
- Tim Bagley as Mr. Diamond ("The Flat Fire")
- Drake Bell as Himself ("Waiting for Gibson")
- Rini Bell as Tanya ("Larrypalooza")
- Billy Aaron Brown as Rob ("The Wheelchair")
- Francis Capra as Tony ("There's Something About Riley")
- Sue Casey as Dolores Strathmore ("The Volunteer")
- Bill Erwin as George ("The Volunteer")
- Art Evans as Clayton Simms ("You've Got Mail")
- Cheryl Hines as Barbara Morrison ("The Job")
- Kathryn Joosten as Louise Van Horn ("The Volunteer")
- Stephen Lee as Ted Morrison ("The Job", "The Flat Fire")
- Jodi Long as Neptune's Net owner ("Manuelo in the Middle (Part 2)")
- Trina McGee-Davis as Waitress ("The New Guy")
- David Reivers as TV commercial director ("The Wheelchair")
- Adam Wylie as Todd ("Riley's New Guy")

== Production ==
=== Filming ===
Filming began the week of February 19, 2001. Production offices for the show were located on the Universal Studios Lot in Universal City, California.

In March 2001, it was revealed the show was slated for a summer premiere date.

In a May 2001, New York Times article, head of children's programming at FOX Family Channel, Joel Andryc said, "...[the Olsens are] on more than any other show on the entire network, daytime or prime time." He went on to say, "and consistently, wherever we put their shows, they do very good numbers. We're positioning our network as sort of a steppingstone between Nickelodeon and MTV. This new series [So Little Time] is going to be a major initiative for us. We're kind of where Comedy Central was a couple of years ago, when suddenly 'South Park' came onto their network and everybody wanted Comedy Central. So, like The Sopranos for HBO or Rugrats for Nickelodeon -- that's what I'm hoping this show will be."

=== Conclusion ===
In 2002, it was reported the show would end after Mary-Kate and Ashley bowed out, in favor of a feature film contract. It was alluded that ABC Family wanted to keep the series after the change over from FOX Family Channel, but "not at any price."

== Broadcasting ==
On 6 August 2001, Fox Kids Europe announced they had acquired worldwide television distribution rights to the series, including the United States.

In Canada, Family Channel aired reruns of the series weekdays at 6:00pm until June 28, 2007, when they were replaced by Zoey 101.

In the United Kingdom, the show aired on BBC One 18 September 2001 and on the Children's Channel CBBC. Some episodes had a shorter running time than others because of the removal of the "behind the scenes" featurettes.

Later in the series, the show starts with the crew wandering around the set with the camera following them. They talk about today's events, such as the birthday of an actor on the set. Mary-Kate and Ashley Olsen usually appear in this segment.

In Italy, the series aired on Italia 1 under the name Due gemelle e un maggiordomo (Two Twins and a butler) from August until September 2002.

A short "behind the scenes" featurette was sometimes included at the end of an episode as well. Although retained on the Warner Home Video VHS and DVD releases, these were always edited out of the U.K. terrestrial transmissions.

The series briefly reran on Nickelodeon in 2015 after the network acquired the rights to Olsen twins' Dualstar video library.

== Episodes ==
No.	Title	Directed by	Written by	Original release date	Prod. code
1	"Dog Day Afternoon"	Rich Correll	Story by : Eric Cohen & Tonya Hurley; Teleplay by : Eric Cohen	June 2, 2001	101
Chloe comes up with a unique theory that boys are no different from dogs. While visiting her father, she then tests this theory in real life on Travis, a boy living in the trailer next door to her dad's. This results in her being humiliated.
2	"Siblings in the City"	Rich Correll	Becky Southwell	June 9, 2001	103
Chloe decides to write a dating column for the newspaper, using her family as a source of inspiration. Bad choice.
3	"The Color of Money"	Rich Correll	Erik Shapiro & Patrick McCarthy	June 16, 2001	106
While the girls raise money for school by selling clothes, Larry purchases tickets for a concert the girls really want to attend by taking the money from the school charity fund without telling them.
4	"There's Something About Riley"	Mark Cendrowski	Eric Cohen	June 23, 2001	107
Riley finds herself unknowingly in a romantic tug-of-war between Larry and Tony (Francis Capra). Meanwhile, there is a bush fire and the whole family are thrown into panic as Macy tries to reach Jake on the phone to warn him about the fire, but he does not pick up. The family is made to evacuate to West Malibu High School.
5	"Girls Just Wanna Have Fun"	Mark Cendrowski	Michael Baser & Frank Dungan	June 30, 2001	108
Riley reluctantly agrees to give history notes to the "baddest" girl in school in exchange for her and Chloe being invited to a wild late-night party, which they luckily sleep through.
6	"You've Got Mail"	Mark Cendrowski	Michael Baser & Frank Dungan	June 29, 2001	109
Chloe attempts to make friends with a grumpy senior citizen, while Riley kisses Larry, and then spends the rest of the day denying it. Macy and her high school crush plan to meet, and once Jake learns of this, he attempts to interrupt them during their "get-together".
7	"Manuelo in the Middle (Part 1)"	Rich Correll	Michael Baser & Frank Dungan	July 7, 2001	104
When the girls' male nanny, Manuelo, is upset about not being included in the family photo, he quits. Riley and Chloe try to come up with a plan to lure him back. To be continued...
8	"Manuelo in the Middle (Part 2)"	Rich Correll	Michael Baser & Frank Dungan	July 14, 2001	105
Riley and Chloe continue their plan to try to get "The Missing Manuelo" back.
9	"True Lies"	Mark Cendrowski	Marcy Vosburgh	July 21, 2001	110
Rather than admit they're having a tough time, the twins try to cheat their way through classes, only to have it backfire.
10	"Tedi's Burnout"	Rich Correll	Eric Cohen	July 28, 2001	111
Rather than being honest, Riley tries to avoid getting into a fight with Chloe. Meanwhile, Tedi decides to "take a break" from modeling.
11	"Teacher's Pet"	Rich Correll	Matt Martin & Jody Milks	August 11, 2001	112
The girls are shocked when their father starts dating their teacher.
12	"Rules of Engagement"	Rich Correll	Michael Baser & Frank Dungan	August 18, 2001	114
The girls try to live their own separate lives, but they start driving everyone around them crazy.
13	"Outbreak"	Rich Correll	Joshua Keene	December 1, 2001	115
A lie becomes reality when Chloe covers for Riley's fake sickness but then gets sick herself and infects the whole family.
14	"The Breakfast Club"	Rich Correll	Michael Baser & Frank Dungan	December 15, 2001	102
Chloe tries desperately to get detention for herself so she can spend time with a student named Travis. This causes all of her schoolmates to get detention when her teachers do not believe that "sweet, innocent Chloe" would be so bad.
15	"The New Guy"	Jean Sagal	Mark Blutman	January 12, 2002	122
Chloe meets a new guy named Lennon, who tends to make her everyday routine something of a mess. Meanwhile, Riley hurts Larry's feelings by forgetting his birthday.
16	"The Massage"	Jean Sagal	Becky Southwell	January 19, 2002	117
Riley becomes addicted to massage therapy, while Chloe tries to work up the nerve to ask Lennon out on a date.
17	"Riley's New Guy"	Jean Sagal	Michael Baser & Frank Dungan	January 26, 2002	120
While Riley has to fight off rumors about a recent date, Chloe finally lets Lennon know that she likes him.
18	"The Wheelchair"	Jean Sagal	Randi Barnes	February 2, 2002	121
When Riley goofs around in a wheelchair, a student named Rob (Billy Aaron Brown), who uses a wheelchair full time, gets the wrong idea. Riley continues her charade, not thinking of the truth's eventual impact on Rob.
19	"The Job"	Jean Sagal	Randi Barnes & Jeny Quine	February 9, 2002	126
To save money for a car, the girls get jobs as waitresses, but they quickly discover that it is not their ideal job.
20	"The Flat Tire"	Jean Sagal	Barry Safchik	February 16, 2002	124
During a driving lesson with a family friend, Riley and Chloe end up stranded on the side of the road when the car gets a flat tire. A passing motorist very kindly offers to help, but the twins' gratitude is short-lived when the guy turns out to be a car thief who steals the car. Meanwhile, Cammie and Larry think that a real estate agent is an acting agent, and Cammie pretends to be a famous celebrity, with Larry as her pretend stalker. In the end, the real estate agent has Larry arrested so that Cammie will be safe.
21	"The Volunteer"	Jean Sagal	Jeny Quine	March 2, 2002	123
Riley and Chloe must cope with the death of an elderly woman named Dolores, whom Riley "adopts". Meanwhile, Cammie is freaking out when there's no entertainment for the coffeehouse. Larry tells Cammie that he will gladly sing at the coffeehouse. The crowd hates his songs, so he sings a song about Cammie's personal life. He becomes a success, but his songs hurt Cammie's feelings. So, Cammie sings a song about Larry's personal life. She and Larry have a fight and break up. After they break up, Larry immediately goes onto the stage and starts singing a song, and Cammie soon joins in, ultimately getting them back together.
22	"Trading Places"	Jeff Meyer	Erik Shapiro & Patrick McCarthy	March 9, 2002	116
Things go terribly wrong when Riley, Chloe, and Larry collaborate on a science project.
23	"Larrypalooza"	Rich Correll	Michael Baser & Frank Dungan	March 16, 2002	118
Chloe, Riley, and Larry decide to create a band to participate in the school's "War of the Bands". Meanwhile, Larry catches the eye of a popular girl named Tanya, which surprisingly makes Riley jealous.
24	"Look Who's Talking"	Rich Correll	Eric Cohen	March 23, 2002	119
When the Carlsons' cable is turned off, they all have to find a way to get along without television.
25	"Waiting for Gibson"	Rich Correll	Marcy Vosburgh	April 27, 2002	113
A case of mistaken identity leads to Chloe losing the affection of her secret admirer. Meanwhile, a security guard frantically chases Manuelo around a television studio.
26	"Sweet 16"	Jean Sagal	Eric Cohen	May 4, 2002	125
A misunderstanding of what they overheard, Riley and Chloe show up for their surprise 16th birthday party on the wrong night. Meanwhile, Cammie and Larry make a documentary for Riley and Chloe. At the end of the episode, everyone watches the documentary. After that, Riley and Chloe ask where their car is. The series ends when Cammie announces that she and Larry have got to go but they will see them tomorrow.

== Home media ==
From 2002 to 2003, Warner Bros. and DualStar released 4 separate volumes of the show on DVD and VHS. Each volume contained 6 episodes each for a total of 24 episodes. In 2005, those 4 volumes were packaged together as one box set containing a fifth DVD with the only two episodes that had not yet been released to DVD ("Outbreak" and "Look Who's Talking"). This box set was titled So Little Time: 5 DVD Gift Set. The episodes on the gift set are not presented in air date or production order, because it is simply a repackaging of the individual DVD releases and each release had its own theme.

Although the gift set and individual releases for volumes 1–4 have since gone out of print, volumes 1–4 were re-released in 2017 as two 2-disc "double feature" sets, the first containing volumes 1 and 2 and the second containing volumes 3 and 4. The bonus disc containing "Outbreak" and "Look Who's Talking" has not been re-released and those two episodes remain only available as part of the 5 DVD Gift Set package.

- So Little Time, Volume 1: School's Cool (August 13, 2002)
- So Little Time, Volume 2: Boy Crazy (August 13, 2002)
- So Little Time, Volume 3: About A Family (August 13, 2002)
- So Little Time, Volume 4: Hangin' Out (June 3, 2003)
- So Little Time: 5 DVD Gift Set (September 6, 2005)

== Books ==
Several episodes of So Little Time were novelized and published in book form by HarperCollins Entertainment. The series also featured new original stories based on the show, which were written by the same authors. As of the spring of 2008, 17 So Little Time books have been released, following the lives of Chloe and Riley.

1. How to Train a Boy
2. Instant Boyfriend
3. Too Good To Be True
4. Just Between Us
5. Tell Me About It
6. Secret Crush
7. Girl Talk
8. The Love Factor
9. Dating Game
10. A Girl's Guide to Guys
11. Boy Crazy
12. Best Friends Forever
13. Love is in the Air
14. Spring Breakup
15. Get Real
16. Surf Holiday
17. The Makeover Experiment

== Soundtrack ==
A soundtrack album featuring the show's theme song as well as other music featured in the series was released by Trauma Records and Dualstar Records in June 2001, and was made available on iTunes, Amazon MP3 and Spotify on June 5, 2010, by Kirtland Records.

1. Arkarna - "So Little Time"
2. Noogie - "Mr. Fabulous"
3. Jason Feddy - "The Beautiful Few"
4. Joey Kingpin - "Rock It"
5. Vienna - "Where I Wanna Be"
6. Ritalin - "Stuck Like Glue"
7. George Tenen III and James Pennington - "You Make Me Love You More"
8. Lovepie - "Thoughts of You"
9. The Getaway People - "Superstar"
10. Chad Hollister - "Leavin' Home"
11. Crashpalace - "Brickwall"
12. The Weekend - "Punk Rock Show"
