= Christian Morals =

Book by Thomas Browne, published 1716

Christian Morals is a prose work written by the physician Sir Thomas Browne as advice for his eldest children. It was published posthumously in 1716 and consists, as its title implies, of meditations upon Christian values and conduct.

== Contents ==
The work is divided into three sections with many of the numbered paragraphs standing-alone as text, with unique and startling imagery involving optics, perspective and appearance. A work of a lifetime's study and understanding of the human condition, in psychological terms, Browne's last major work may be considered as advice on obtaining individuation and self-realization as much as Christian virtue.

== Baroque style ==
Stylistically, it displays some of the best and worst excesses of Browne's at times labyrinthine and meandering baroque style, often involving parallelisms in its sentence construction.

== Samuel Johnson edition ==
Christian Morals was edited by Samuel Johnson in 1756; Johnson prefaced his edition with a biography of Browne. His latter prose imitated aspects of Browne's late prose-style.
