= Alice Leonard =

Expert on early modern history and literature

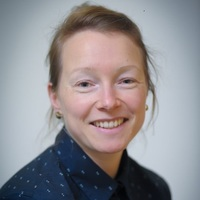
Dr Alice Leonard

Alice Leonard ^{FRHistS} is an expert on early modern history and literature, specifically error, book history, and science. She is an Assistant Professor at the Centre for Arts and Creative Cultures at Coventry University. She was elected as a Fellow of the Royal Historical Society in September 2022.

== Education ==
Leonard received her PhD from the University of Warwick and the Université de Neuchâtel in 2015. Her doctoral thesis was entitled Error in Shakespeare, Shakespeare in Error.

== Research and career ==
Leonard published her monograph, Shakespeare in Error: Error in Shakespeare, in 2020 with Palgrave-Macmillan. Before her appointment at Coventry University, she was a Marie Curie Cofund Fellow at the Institute of Advanced Study, University of Warwick. Leonard has published on Shakespeare's Hamlet, Thomas Browne’s Pseudodoxia Epidemica (1646), the female gaze, and representations of foreignness on the early modern stage. Her work has been described as 'provocative, liberating, and even radical'. Leonard is a co-editor on the Notebooks volume of The Complete Works of Thomas Browne, forthcoming with OUP. She was the Byrne-Bussey Marconi Fellow at the Bodleian Library, Oxford University, in 2022. She is a co-investigator on the Project, 'Reading the Room: Books, Access and Community in Heritage Spaces', with Prof. Abigail Williams, Executive Dean for the Faculty of Arts & Humanities at King's College London. She has contributed to the Atlantic magazine.

== Bibliography ==
- Leonard, Alice, Error in Shakespeare, Shakespeare in Error (London: Palgrave-Macmillan, 2020)
- Leonard, Alice, 'The Page’s a Stage: Critical Editions and the Craft of Early Modern Printing', Times Literary Supplement, (1 Jan 2021)
- Leonard, Alice, and Sarah E. Parker, '"Put a Mark on the Errors": Seventeenth Century Medicine and Science', History of Science, 61(3), 2023, 287–307
- Leonard, Alice, 'Misprinting and Misreading in "The Comedy of Errors"', Printing and Misprinting: A Companion to Mistakes and In-House Corrections in Renaissance Europe (1450-1650), ed. by G. Della Rocca de Candal, P. Sachet, and A. Grafton (Oxford University Press, 2023) pp. 399–414
