= Morbid Anatomy Museum =

Defunct museum in Brooklyn, New York (2014-2016)

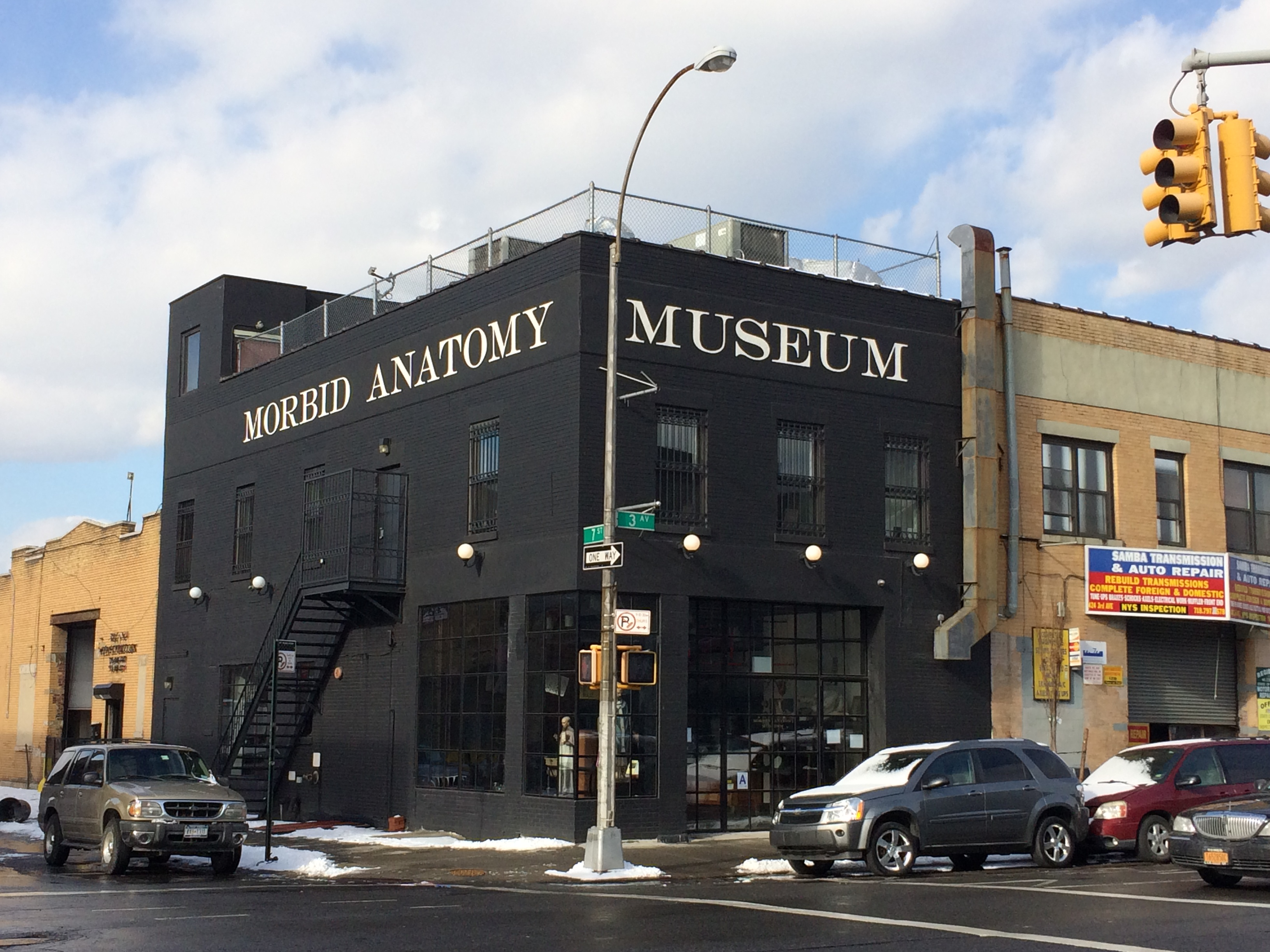
- Established: June 27, 2014
- Dissolved: December 18, 2016
- Location: Brooklyn, New York
- Coordinates: 40.672844°N 73.990053°W
- Type: Natural History, Anatomy, Dime Museum
- Key holdings: Morbid Anatomy Library, rotating collections
- Founders: Joanna Ebenstein, Tracy Hurley Martin, Colin Dickey, Aaron Beebe, Tonya Hurley
- Architects: Robert Kirkbride and Anthony Cohn
- Website: morbidanatomymuseum.org

The Morbid Anatomy Museum was a non-profit exhibition space founded in 2014 by Joanna Ebenstein, Tracy Hurley Martin, Colin Dickey, Tonya Hurley, and Aaron Beebe in the Gowanus neighborhood of Brooklyn, New York City. The museum closed in 2016, but its research library remains open.

== History ==
The Museum was conceived, organized and planned by Joanna Ebenstein, Tracy Hurley Martin, Colin Dickey, and Aaron Beebe. It was an expansion of Ebenstein's long-running project, the Morbid Anatomy Blog and Library and drew heavily on her experiences with the also defunct art groups Observatory and Proteus Gowanus, as well as Beebe's work in the Coney Island Museum and Dickey's interest in the arcane and the esoteric.

The museum was located at 424a Third Avenue in Brooklyn, a former nightclub building the interior of which was re-modeled by architects Robert Kirkbride and Tony Cohn in 2014.

The space focused on forgotten or neglected histories through exhibitions, education, and public programming. Themes included nature, death and society, anatomy, medicine, arcane media, and curiosity and curiosities broadly considered. The artifacts featured in its rotating exhibitions were drawn from private collections and museums' storage spaces.

The museum building also had a lecture and event space, a cafe, and a store. In Ebenstein's words, the space was designed to give a home for a "regular lecture series and DIY intellectual salon that brings together artists, writers, curators and passionate amateurs dedicated to what [Ebenstein] sums up as 'the things that fall through the cracks'".

The museum's closing was announced on December 18, 2016. The museum's extensive research library remains open to the public in Industry City.

== See also ==
- Cabinet of curiosities
- Dime museum
