= The Garden of Cyrus =

1658 writings by Thomas Browne

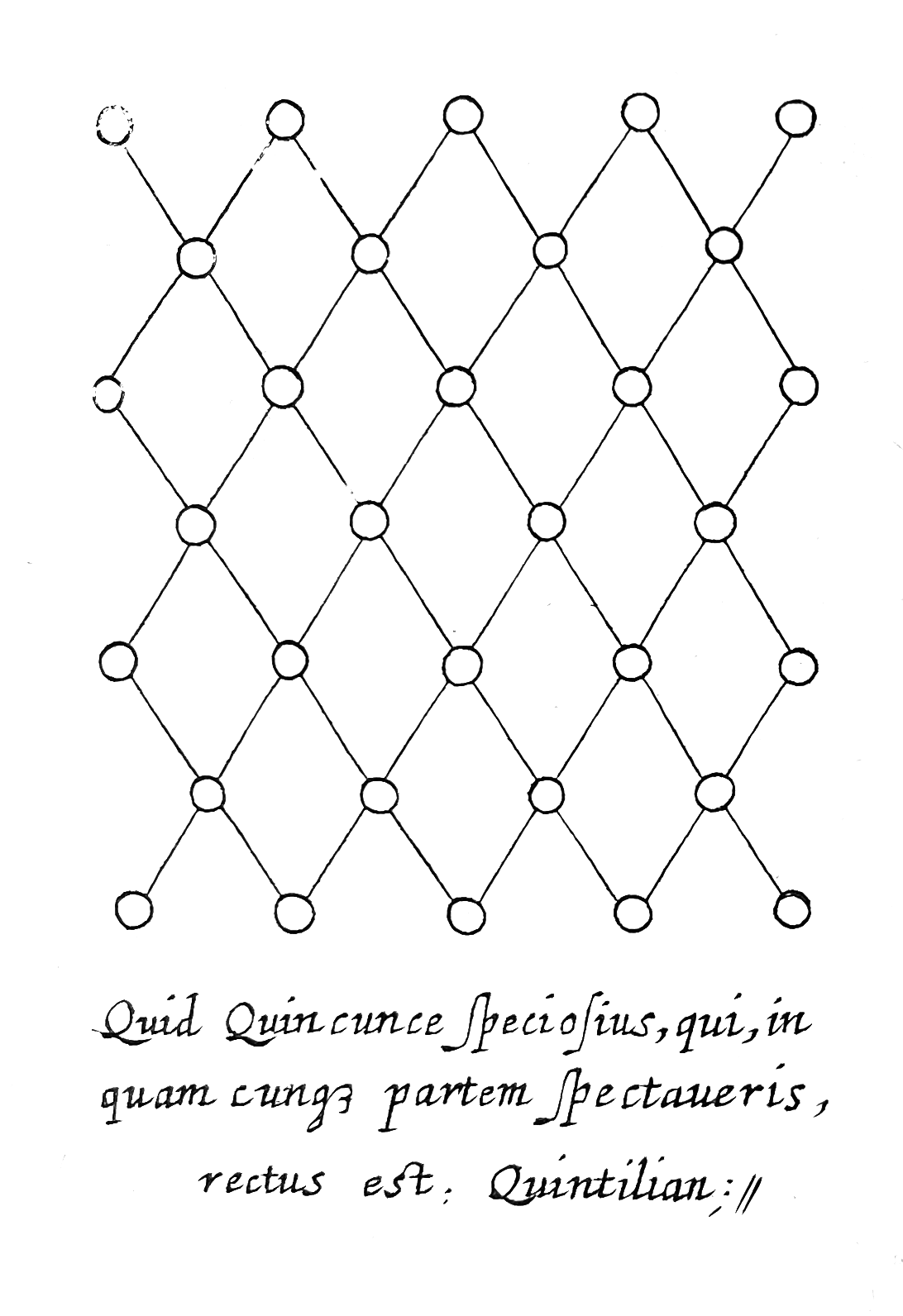
Frontispiece to The Garden of Cyrus (1658). The Latin text, from Quintilian's Institutio Oratoria, translates: "What is more beautiful than the quincunx, that, from whatever direction you regard it, presents straight lines?"

The Garden of Cyrus, or The Quincuncial Lozenge, or Network Plantations of the Ancients, naturally, artificially, mystically considered, is a discourse by the English polymath Thomas Browne concerned with the quincunx—a pattern of five points arranged in an X (⁙), as on a die —in art and nature. First published in 1658, along with its companion Urn-Burial, in modern times it has been recognised as Browne's major literary contribution to Hermetic wisdom.

The book draws its primary influences from the Book of Genesis and Plato's Timaeus, initially covering Browne's speculation about the location of the mythical Garden of Eden. Browne proceeds to explore the role of the number 5 and the quincunx in art and human design, in natural patterns, in botany, and in mysticism. He offers Neoplatonic and Neopythagorean arguments about the interconnection of art and nature. Browne was concerned with finding evidence of intelligent design in nature. The book uses a number of neologisms from Browne's era, including the then-new terms prototype and archetype.

The literary critic Edmund Gosse considered this mystical text to be a "radically bad book", but argued that it contains a number of high-quality paragraphs.

== Literary allusions ==
The book begins with the Genesis creation narrative, allusions to Plato's discourse the Timaeus and speculation upon the location of the Garden of Eden. It continues on orchard planting patterns of the Ancient Persians, who used the quincunx pattern to ensure "a regular angularity, and through prospect, was left on every side". Browne explores the number five and the quincunx pattern as seen in art and human design (chapters 1 and 2) as a pattern in nature, in particular through his extensive study of botany (central chapter 3) and mystically (chapters 4 and 5).

== Increased English interest in esoterica during Oliver Cromwell's Protectorate ==
Written during a time when restrictions on publishing became more relaxed during Oliver Cromwell's Protectorate, The Garden of Cyrus is Browne's contribution to a "boom period" decade of interest in esoterica in England.

== Neoplatonic and Neopythagorean arguments about the interconnection of art and nature ==
Browne's discourse is a neoplatonic and neopythagorean vision of the interconnection of art and nature via the inter-related symbols of the number five and the quincunx pattern, along with the figure X and the lattice design. Its fundamental quest was of primary concern to Hermetic philosophy: proof of the wisdom of God, and demonstrable evidence of intelligent design. The discourse includes early recorded usage of the words "prototype" and "archetype" in English.

== Reception ==
The 19th- and 20th-century critic Edmund Gosse complained of the book that "gathering his forces it is Quincunx, Quincunx, all the way until the very sky itself is darkened with revolving Chess-boards", while conceding that "this radically bad book contains some of the most lovely paragraphs which passed from an English pen during the seventeenth century".
