= Joan Carlile =

British artist (c. 1606–1679)

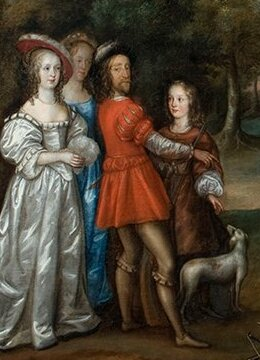
- A self-portrait of Carlile and her family from a larger work, The Carlile Family with Sir Justinian Isham in Richmond Park
- Born: Joan Palmer c. 1606
- Died: 1679; London
- Resting place: Churchyard of Petersham Parish Church
- Known for: Portrait painting
- Spouse: Lodowick Carlell or Carlile

Signature
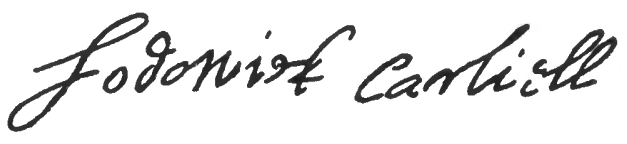

Joan Carlile or Carlell or Carliell (c. 1606–1679), was an English portrait painter. She was one of the first English women known to practise painting professionally. Before Carlile, known professional female painters working in Britain were born elsewhere in Europe, principally the Low Countries.

== Biography ==
Joan Carlile (Note: According to historian Stephen Pasmore, "In 1760 in an essay on painting Bainbrigg Buckeridge wrongly referred to Mrs. Carlile's Christian name as Anne and later writers have continued the mistake." Stephen Pasmore (May 1983). "Old Petersham Lodge: A Royalist Refuge after the Civil War". Richmond History: Journal of the Richmond Local History Society. 4: 18.) was born as Joan Palmer, the daughter of William Palmer, an official in the Royal Parks and his wife, Mary. Carlile copied the works of Italian masters and reproduced them in miniature. She was also an accomplished painter in her own right.

In July 1626 she married Lodowick Carlell or Carlile, Gentleman of the Bows to Charles I and a poet and dramatist, who, as keeper/deputy ranger at Richmond Park during the Commonwealth period, had accommodation at Petersham Lodge, where they lived from 1637 to 1663. (Note: Petersham Lodge, now referred to by historians as "Old Petersham Lodge", was demolished in the 1690s by Lawrence Hyde, Earl of Rochester. "Lost buildings in Richmond Park: the Prime Minister's school and a magnificent mansion". The Collection. The Hearsum Collection. 29 June 2015.) The couple moved to Covent Garden in 1654 but returned to Petersham two years later after the restoration of the monarchy, when Lodowick was given the post of "Keeper of the house or Lodge and the Walk at Petersham". They returned to London in 1665.

Lodowick died in 1675 and was buried in the churchyard of Petersham Parish Church (which was then in Surrey and is now in the London Borough of Richmond upon Thames). Joan, who was then living in the parish of St Martin-in-the-Fields, died in 1679, and was buried beside her husband on 27 February.

They had three children, Penelope (who married John Fisher, a lawyer of the Middle Temple in 1657), James (who was married to Ellen; they had two sons, James and Lodowick) and Edmund.

== Works ==
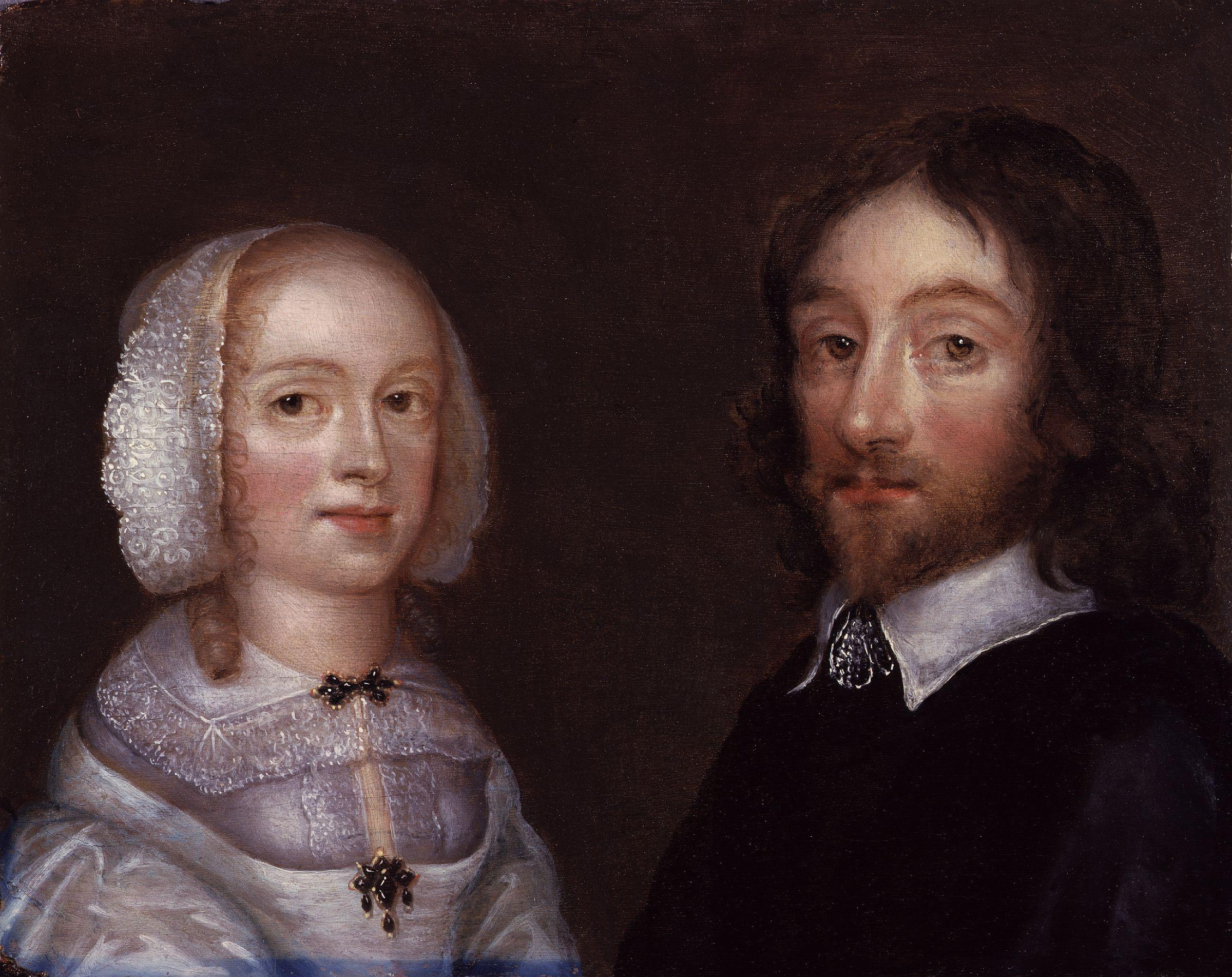
Joan Carlile's portrait Lady Dorothy Browne and Sir Thomas Browne

Carlile's portrait Lady Dorothy Browne and Sir Thomas Browne is held at London's National Portrait Gallery. The National Portrait Gallery's portrait of Sir Thomas Browne is also attributed to her.

In 2016, the Tate acquired Carlile's Portrait of an Unknown Lady which she painted between 1650 and 1655.

A painting from circa 1648 of Elizabeth Murray, Countess of Dysart with her husband and sister has been attributed to Carlile and is held by the National Trust. It is on display at Ham House. Another painting of the Countess of Dysart, attributed to Carlile, is held by the Thirlestane Castle Trust.

The Carlile Family with Sir Justinian Isham in Richmond Park is held at Lamport Hall in Lamport, Northamptonshire. Also known as A Stag Hunt, The Stag Hunt, or Stag hunt in Richmond Park, it was exhibited at the Tate Gallery in 1972. This work by Carlile has assisted in attributing other artwork in similar styles to be hers.

Her full-length portrait of a lady, believed to be Lady Anne Wentworth, in a white dress and a purple mantle, is in a private collection.

A miniature portrait, attributed to Carlile, described as A Lady, Wearing White Dress With Brooch at Her Corsage..., was auctioned by Sotheby's in London in 2005.

== See also ==
- Mary Beale – English painter (1633–1699)
