= Hydriotaphia, Urn Burial =

Book by Thomas Browne

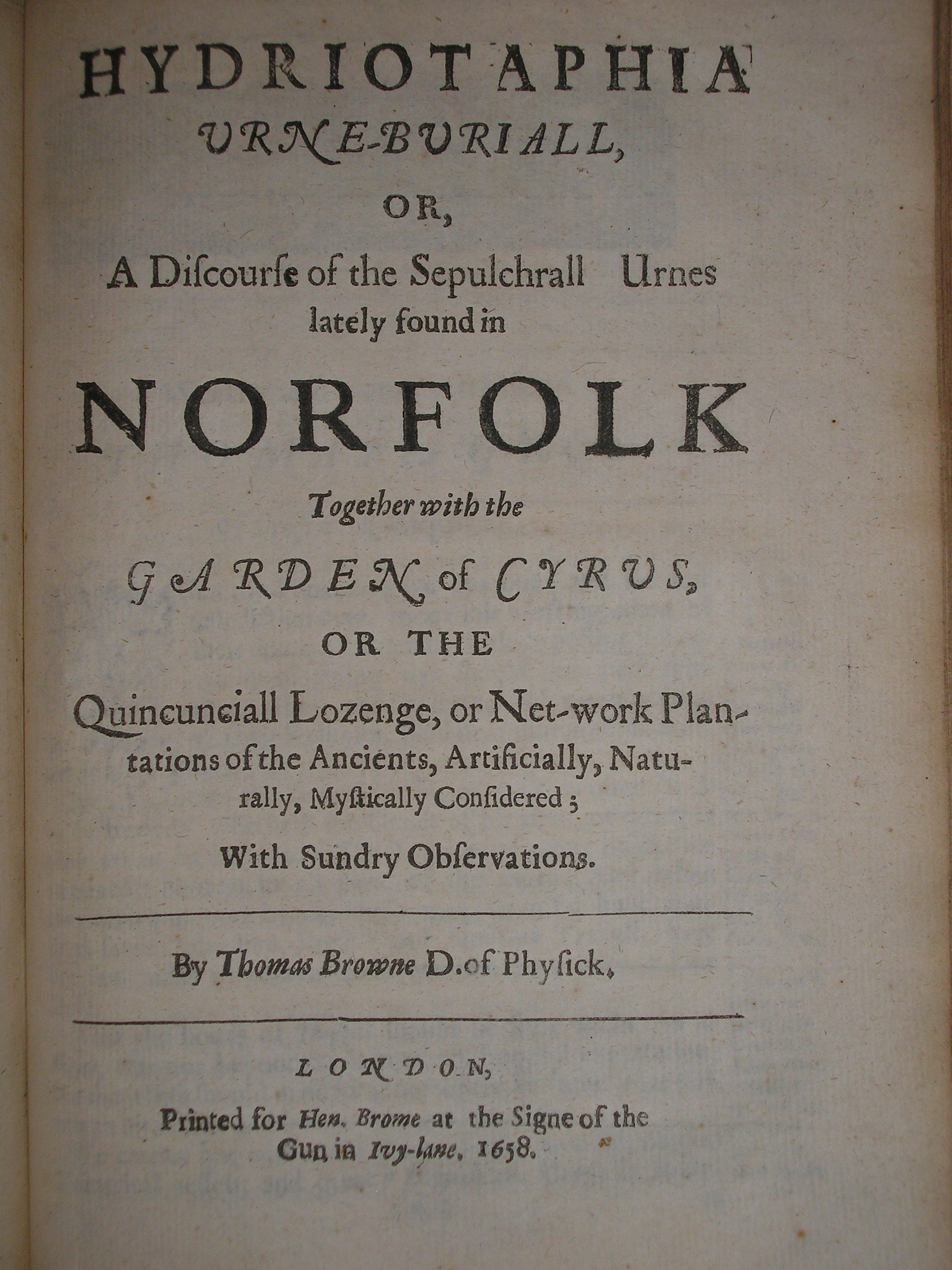
Title-page of 1658 edition of Urn-Burial together with The Garden of Cyrus

Hydriotaphia, Urne-Buriall, or, A Discourse of the Sepulchrall Urnes lately found in Norfolk is a work by the English polymath Thomas Browne, published in 1658 as the first part of a two-part work that concludes with The Garden of Cyrus.

The pretext for the book is the archaeological discovery of Anglo-Saxon pottery in Norfolk, with Browne describing the antiquities. He then provides a survey of funerary customs, both ancient and those current to his own era. In describing human nature, Browne notes the tendency of humans to solemnize both births and deaths, using their "pompous" graves to establish their self-importance.

== Meaning of the title ==
The title is Greek for "urn burial": A hydria (ὑδρία) is a large Greek pot, and taphos (τάφος) means "tomb".

== Survey of funerary customs ==
Its nominal subject was the discovery of some 40 to 50 Anglo-Saxon pots in Norfolk. The discovery of these remains prompts Browne to deliver, first, a description of the antiquities found, and then a survey of most of the burial and funerary customs, ancient and current, of which his era was aware.

== Description of human nature ==
The most famous part of the work is the apotheosis of the fifth chapter, where Browne declaims:

But man is a Noble Animal, splendid in ashes, and pompous in the grave, solemnizing Nativities and Deaths with equal lustre, nor omitting Ceremonies of bravery, in the infamy of his nature. Life is a pure flame, and we live by an invisible Sun within us.

George Saintsbury, in the Cambridge History of English Literature (1911), calls the totality of Chapter V "the longest piece, perhaps, of absolutely sublime rhetoric to be found in the prose literature of the world."

== Influence ==
Urn Burial has been admired by Charles Lamb, Samuel Johnson, John Cowper Powys, James Joyce, and Herman Melville, while Ralph Waldo Emerson said that it "smells in every word of the sepulchre".

Browne's text is discussed in W. G. Sebald's novel The Rings of Saturn.

The English composer William Alwyn wrote his Symphony No. 5, subtitled Hydriotaphia, in homage to Browne's imagery and rhythmic prose.

The American composer Douglas J. Cuomo's The Fate of His Ashes: Requiem for Victims of Power for chorus and organ takes its text from Urn Burial.

Eric Ambler excerpts a passage from chapter 5 ("But the iniquity of oblivion blindly scattereth her poppy...") as the epigraph for the novel The Mask of Dimitrios.

Derek Walcott uses an excerpt as the epigraph to his poem "Ruins of a Great House," while Edgar Allan Poe quotes the Urn Burial in the epigraph of "The Murders in the Rue Morgue."

Kevin Powers uses an excerpt from the fifth chapter ("To be ignorant of evils to come, and forgetful of evils past...") as one of the epigraphs for his novel The Yellow Birds.

Alain de Botton references the work in his book Status Anxiety.

CS Lewis, in An Experiment in Criticism, uses it as an example of "books which compel a good reading in the sense that no one who reads in the wrong way would be likely to get through more than a few of their pages."

Borges refers to it in the final line of his short story "Tlön, Uqbar, Orbis Tertius".

It also appears in the novel Sanshirō, written by Natsume Sōseki; Hirota-sensei lent the book to Sanshirō.

The British mystery writer Reginald Hill (writing as "Patrick Ruell") uses quotes from Urn-Burial as chapter headings for his novel Beyond the Bone (1975), which was also published under the alternative title Urn Burial.

The American playwright, screenwriter and essayist Tony Kushner uses the work as the point of departure for his five-act "epic farce" Hydriotaphia, or the Death of Doctor Browne, first produced in New York City in June 1987, by Heat & Light Co., Inc., and then in April 1997 by the Graduate Acting Program of the NYU Tisch School of the Arts, with a coproduction the following year by the Alley Theatre in Houston, Texas, and Berkeley Repertory Theatre in Berkeley, California.

American nonfiction writer Colin Dickey compares some of Browne's writing on death in Urn-Burial to the fate of Browne's skull in his book Cranioklepty: Grave Robbing and the Search for Genius.
