= Tonya Hurley =

American writer and director in film, television, live performance, interactive media

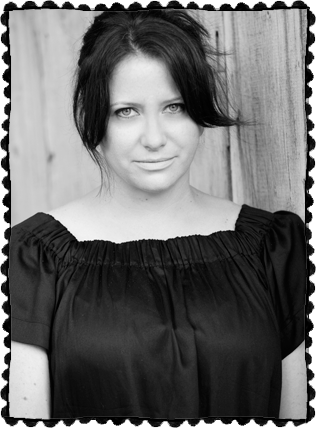
- Born: September 20, 1970 (age 56); Uniontown, Pennsylvania, U.S.
- Occupations: Writer, director
- Spouse: Michael Pagnotta
- Children: 1
- Relatives: Vince Clarke (brother-in-law)
- Website: www.tonyahurley.com

Tonya Hurley is an American writer and director in film, television, live performance, and interactive media, known as co-creator and co-producer of the 2001 television series So Little Time, which featured the Olsen twins. Her work with them continued in Mary-Kate and Ashley in Action!, spanning 4 episodes, and as co-executive producer of various tie-in video games.

She is also an author of young adult fiction, including The New York Times bestselling book series ghostgirl. Precious Blood, the first book in The Blessed trilogy, was published in 2012, and Passionaries, the second book, was released January 7, 2013. A third novel entitled Hallowed followed up in 2015. The Blessed audiobook is read by Moonrise Kingdom star Kara Hayward.

Her books are published in nearly 30 countries and in more than 20 languages.

== Early career ==
Hurley began her career as a music publicist for artists such as Prince, George Michael, Depeche Mode, The Cure, Bush, Erasure, Morrissey, The B-52’s, Paul Westerberg, John Cale, The Three Tenors and Johnny Rotten, among others. Both Tonya and her twin sister Tracy originally moved to New York with the aspiration of becoming musicians, but instead ended up working at the publicity firm founded by Michael Pagnotta, Tonya's future husband.

== Written works ==
Her work includes Kiss My Brain (1997); The Biblical Real World (1998); Solo-Me-O (1999), first broadcast on PBS in their documentary series Reel New York; and Baptism of Solitude: A Tribute to Paul Bowles (2000), a Tribeca Festival selection which aired on the Independent Film Channel, nominated for a Rockefeller Foundation Award in film, and distributed on a DVD through the United Nations. Best Friend (2001) premiered at the 2002 Tribeca Festival and Edinburgh International Film Festival and was broadcast on Trio. She wrote a feature-length script, Good Mourning, which made the semi-finals of the Sundance Institute's Writer's Lab. She has written and directed book trailers for her own books and co-wrote and co-directed two stop-motion music videos for Erasure – "Gaudete" and "Make It Wonderful".

== Television and other media ==
Hurley was co-creator and co-producer of the sitcom So Little Time (ABC Family) and the animated Mary-Kate and Ashley in Action! (ABC) both starring Mary-Kate and Ashley Olsen. She was the primary provider of original content for the mary-kateandashley website and creator and co-executive producer of mary-kateandashley brand video games for PlayStation 2 and Game Boy. She wrote, produced, and directed commercials related to the property for Warner Home video, PlayStation, and Game Boy, and developed Mary-Kate and Ashley dolls and boardgames for Mattel.

Hurley and her sister ran Hurley Sisters Productions.

== ghostgirl ==
Hurley's series ghostgirl was launched in 2002 on ghostgirl.com and published as a Young Adult series from Little, Brown, and Co. in 2008. The first novel of the series received starred reviews from Publishers Weekly, Kirkus Reviews, Voice of Youth Advocates, and School Library Journal. It hit the New York Times best-seller list the week of September 14, 2008. The books have been optioned for film by director Matthew Vaughan. Hurley is set to be the executive producer.

== Memberships and honors ==
Hurley is a member of Writers Guild of America, East and the Horror Writers Association. She is a contributor to The Huffington Post, sponsors and judges the Teen Writing Essay Contest for Gilda's Club NYC and is the editor of the ebook Living With Cancer: A Teen Perspective with a foreword by actress Emma Stone. Hurley is a founding board member of the Morbid Anatomy Museum in Brooklyn, New York.

== Personal life ==
She is married to the publicist and artist manager Michael Pagnotta.

== Bibliography ==
=== ghostgirl ===
- ghostgirl (2008; Little, Brown, and Co.) – ISBN 978-0316113571
- ghostgirl: Homecoming (2009) – ISBN 978-0316089432
- ghostgirl: Lovesick (2010) – ISBN 978-0316070263
- ghostgirl Xmas Spirit (2012) (novella)

=== The Blessed ===
- The Blessed (2012; Simon & Schuster Books for Young Readers) – ISBN 978-1442429512
- Passionaries (2013) – ISBN 978-1444904765
- Hallowed (2015) – ISBN 978-1442429574

== Filmography ==
Work	Type	Year	Creator	Director	Producer	Executive Producer	Writer
Solo-Me-O	Short	1999	?	Yes	?	?	?
Baptism of Solitude: A Tribute to Paul Bowles	Short Animation	2001	?	Yes	?	?	?
So Little Time	Television sitcom	2001-2002	Yes	–	Yes (24 ep)	–	Yes (1 ep)
Mary-Kate and Ashley in Action!	TV series	2001-2002	–	–	–	–	Yes (4 ep)
Best FriEND	Short Documentary	2002	?	Yes	?	Yes	?
Erasure: "Gaudete"	Music Video	2013	–	Yes	–	–	–
Erasure: "Make It Wonderful"	Music Video	2013	–	Yes	–	–	–
