= Thomas Browne =

English polymath and writer (1605–1682)

Sir Thomas Browne
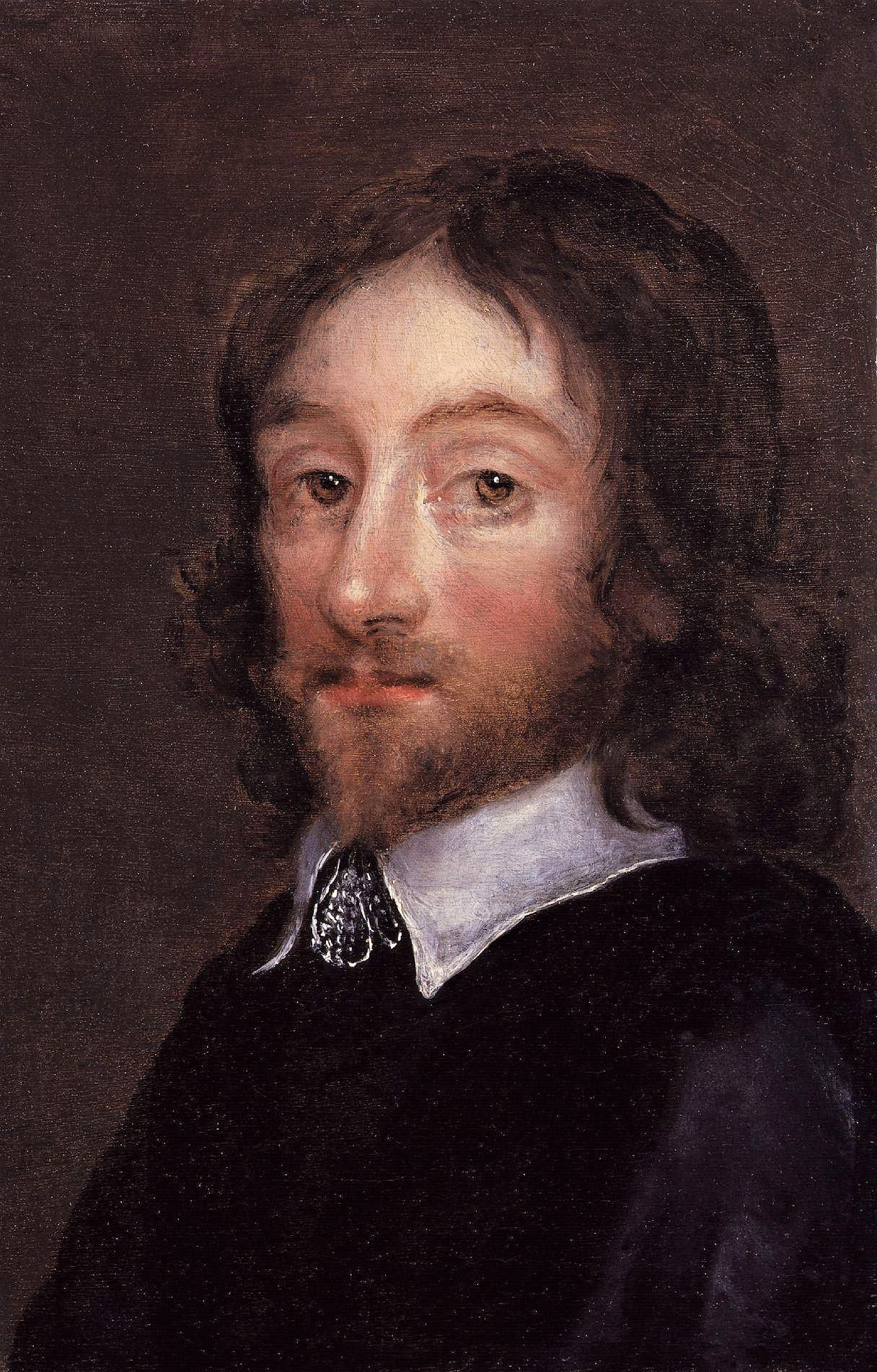
- Sir Thomas Browne (c. 1641–1650), attributed to Joan Carlile
- Born: 19 October 1605; London, England
- Died: 19 October 1682 (aged 77); Norwich, England
- Education: Winchester College; Pembroke College, Oxford; University of Padua; Leiden University
- Known for: Religio Medici, Urne-Burial and The Garden of Cyrus, Pseudodoxia Epidemica, Christian Morals

Sir Thomas Browne (/braʊn/ "brown"; 19 October 1605 – 19 October 1682) was an English polymath and author of varied works which reveal his wide learning in diverse fields including science, medicine, religion and the esoteric. His writings display a deep curiosity towards the natural world, influenced by the Scientific Revolution of Baconian enquiry and are permeated by references to Classical and Biblical sources as well as the idiosyncrasies of his own personality. Although often described as suffused with melancholia, Browne's writings are also characterised by wit and subtle humour, while his literary style is varied, according to genre, resulting in a rich, unique prose which ranges from rough notebook observations to polished Baroque eloquence.

== Biography ==
=== Early life ===
Thomas Browne was born in the parish of St Michael, Cheapside, in London on 19 October 1605. He was the youngest child of Thomas Browne, a silk merchant from Upton, Cheshire, and Anne Browne, the daughter of Paul Garraway of Lewes, Sussex. He had an elder brother and two elder sisters. The family, who had lived at Upton for several generations, were "evidently people of some importance" who "intermarried with families of position in that neighbourhood", and were armigerous. Browne's paternal grandmother, Elizabeth, was the daughter of Henry Birkenhead, Clerk of the Green Cloth to Elizabeth I of England and Clerk of the Crown for the counties of Cheshire and Flintshire. Browne's father died while he was young, and his mother married Sir Thomas Dutton of Gloucester and Isleworth, Middlesex, by whom she had two daughters.

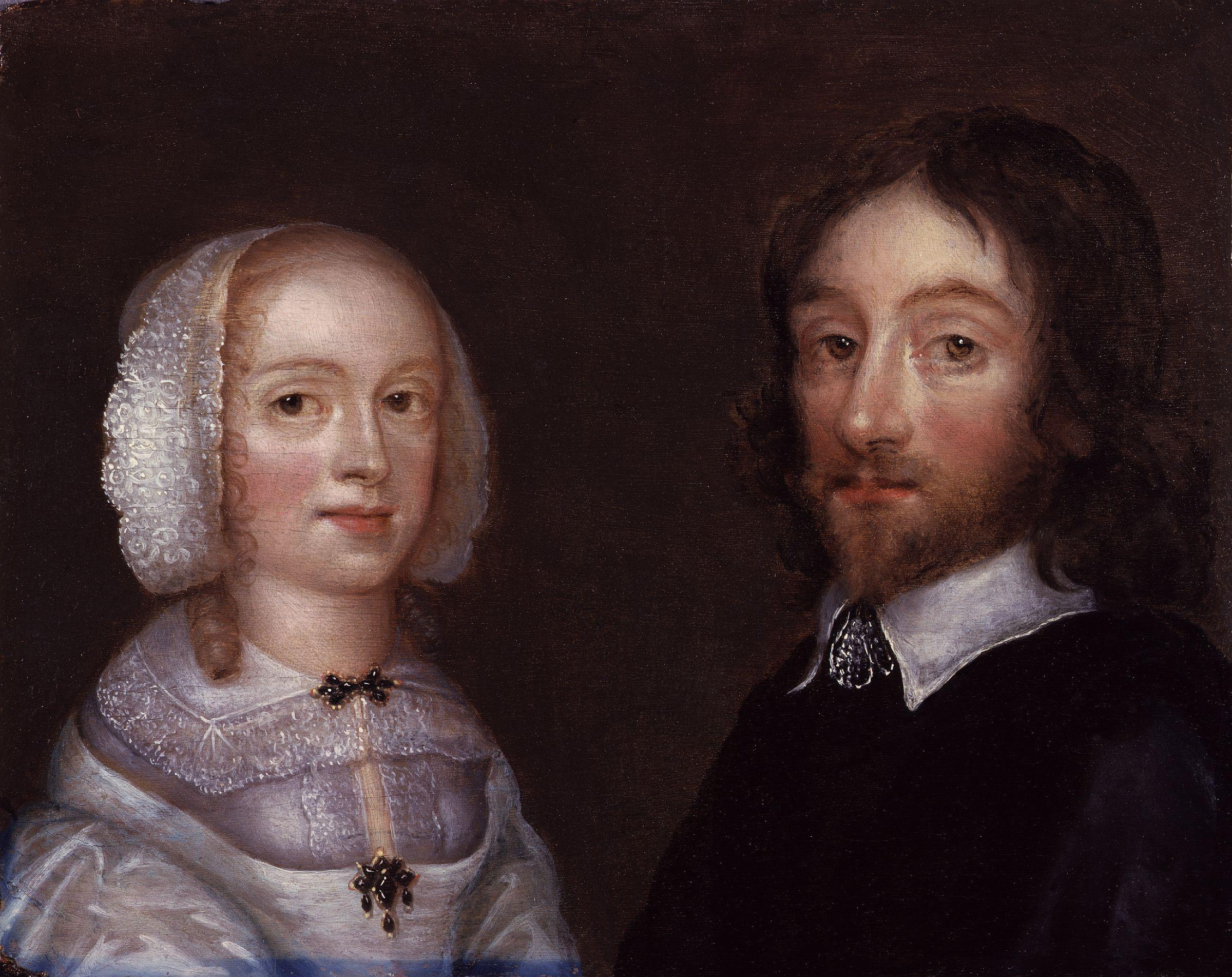
Lady Dorothy Browne and Sir Thomas Browne (c. 1641–1650), by Joan Carlile

Browne was educated at Winchester College. In 1623, he went to Broadgates Hall of Oxford University. Browne was chosen to deliver the undergraduate oration when the hall was incorporated as Pembroke College in August 1624. He graduated from Oxford in January 1627, after which he studied medicine at Padua and Montpellier universities, completing his studies at Leiden, where he received a medical degree in 1633. He settled in Norwich in 1637 and practised medicine there until he died in 1682.

In 1641, Browne married Dorothy Mileham of Burlingham St Peter, Norfolk. They had 10 children, six of whom died before their parents.

=== Literary career ===
Browne's first literary work was Religio Medici (The Religion of a Physician). It surprised him when an unauthorised edition appeared in 1642, which included unorthodox religious speculations. An authorised text appeared in 1643, with some of the more controversial views removed. The expurgation did not end the controversy. The Scottish writer Alexander Ross attacked Religio Medici in his Medicus Medicatus (1645). Browne's book was placed upon the Papal Index Librorum Prohibitorum in the same year.

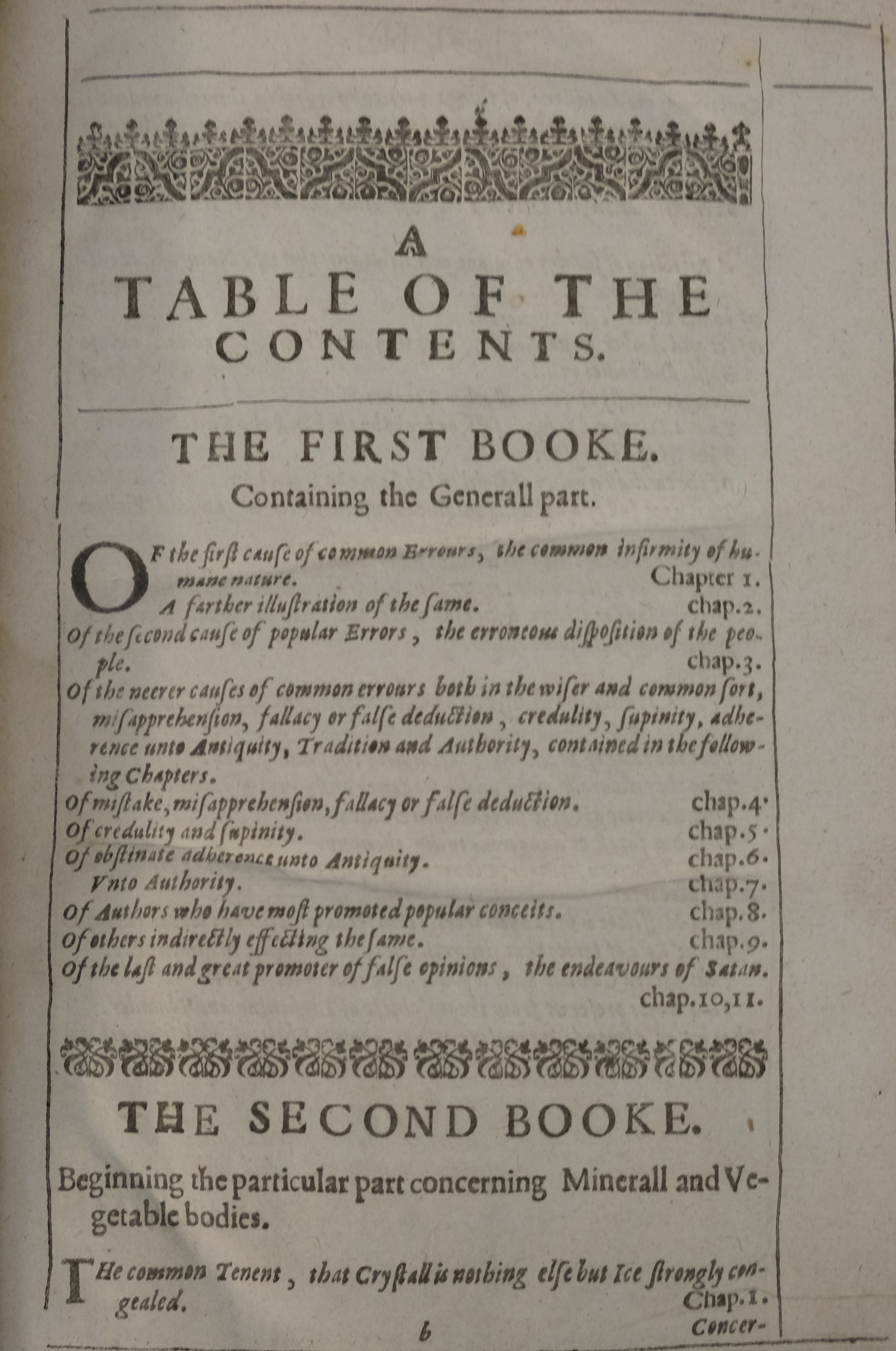
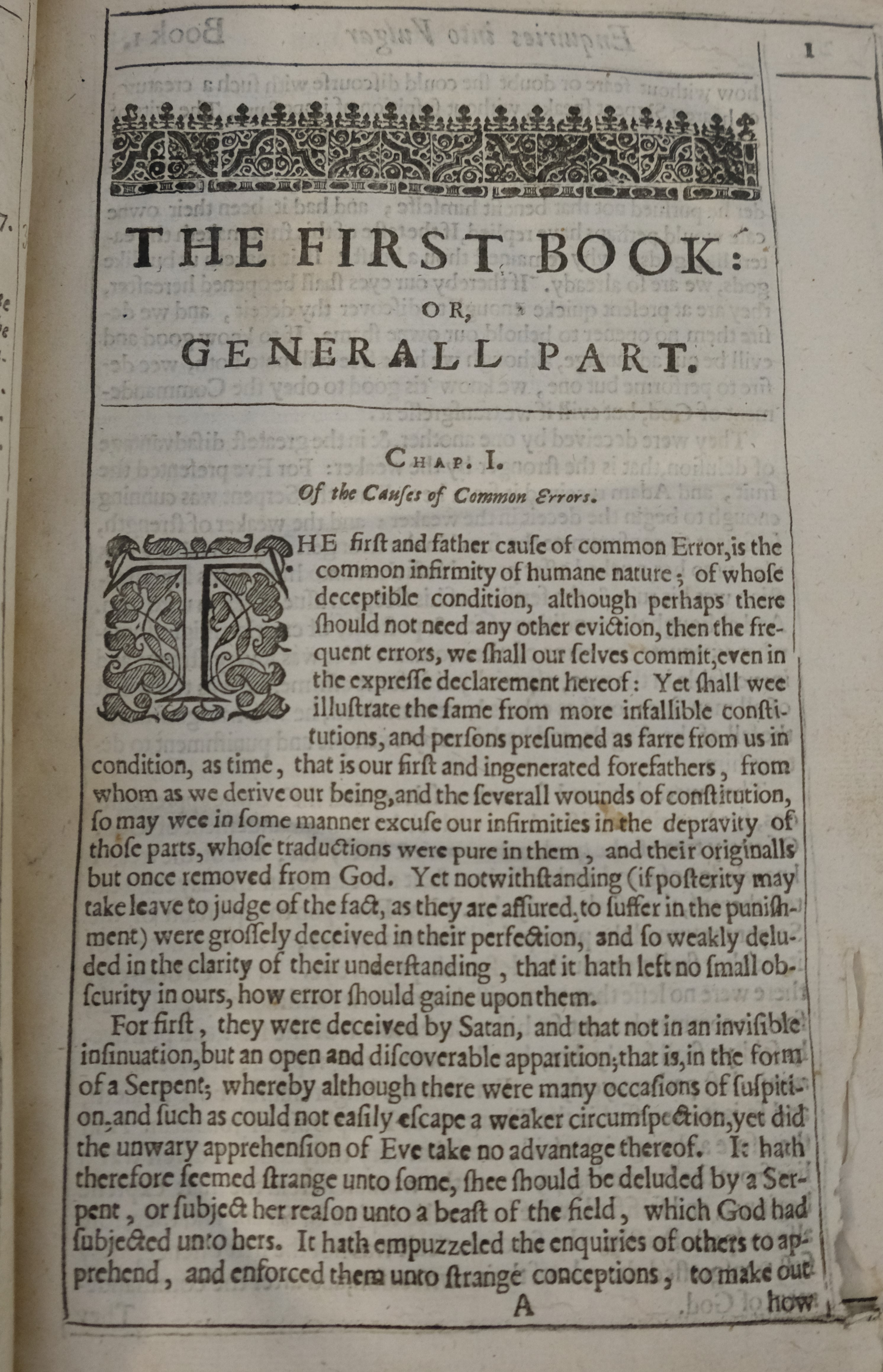
Contents and first page of a 1646 copy of Browne's Pseudodoxia Epidemica

In 1646, Browne published his encyclopaedia, Pseudodoxia Epidemica, or, Enquiries into Very many Received Tenents, and commonly Presumed Truths, the title of which refers to the prevalence of false beliefs and "vulgar errors". A sceptical work that debunks in a methodical and witty manner several legends circulating at the time, it displays the Baconian side of Browne—the side that was unafraid of what at the time was still called the "New Learning". The book is significant in the history of science because it promoted an awareness of scientific journalism.

The last works published by Browne were two philosophical Discourses. They are closely related to each other in concept. The first, Hydriotaphia, Urn Burial, or a Brief Discourse of the Sepulchral Urns lately found in Norfolk (1658), was inspired by the discovery in Norfolk of some 40 to 50 Anglo-Saxon burial urns. It is a literary meditation upon death, the funerary customs of the world and the ephemerality of fame. The other discourse in the diptych is antithetical in style, subject matter and imagery. The Garden of Cyrus, or The Quincuncial Lozenge, or Network Plantations of the Ancients, Artificially, Naturally, and Mystically Considered (1658) features the quincunx that Browne used to demonstrate evidence of the Platonic forms in art and nature.

=== Later life and knighthood ===
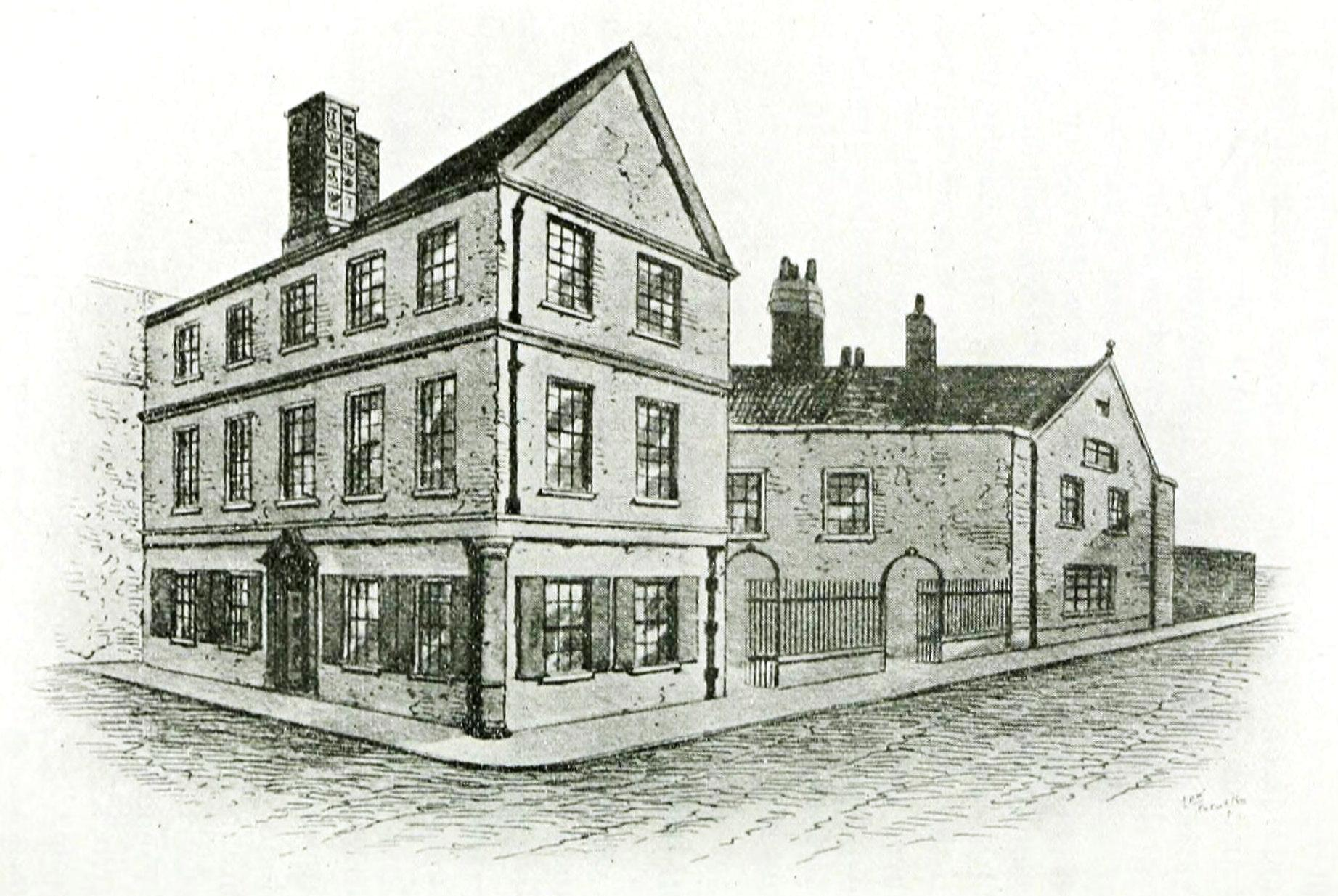
Browne's house in Norwich

Browne believed in the existence of angels and witchcraft. He attended the 1662 Bury St Edmunds witch trial, where his citation of a similar trial in Denmark may have influenced the jury's minds concerning two accused women, who were later found guilty of witchcraft.

In November 1671, King Charles II, accompanied by his Court, visited Norwich. The courtier John Evelyn, who had occasionally corresponded with Browne, made good use of the royal visit to call upon "the learned doctor" of European fame and wrote of his visit, recording that "his whole house and garden is a paradise and Cabinet of rarities and that of the best collection, amongst Medails, books, Plants, natural things". During his visit, Charles visited Browne's home. A banquet was held in St Andrew's Hall for the royal visit. Obliged to honour a notable local, the name of the Mayor of Norwich was proposed to the King for knighthood. The Mayor, however, declined the honour and proposed Browne's name instead.

=== Death and aftermath ===
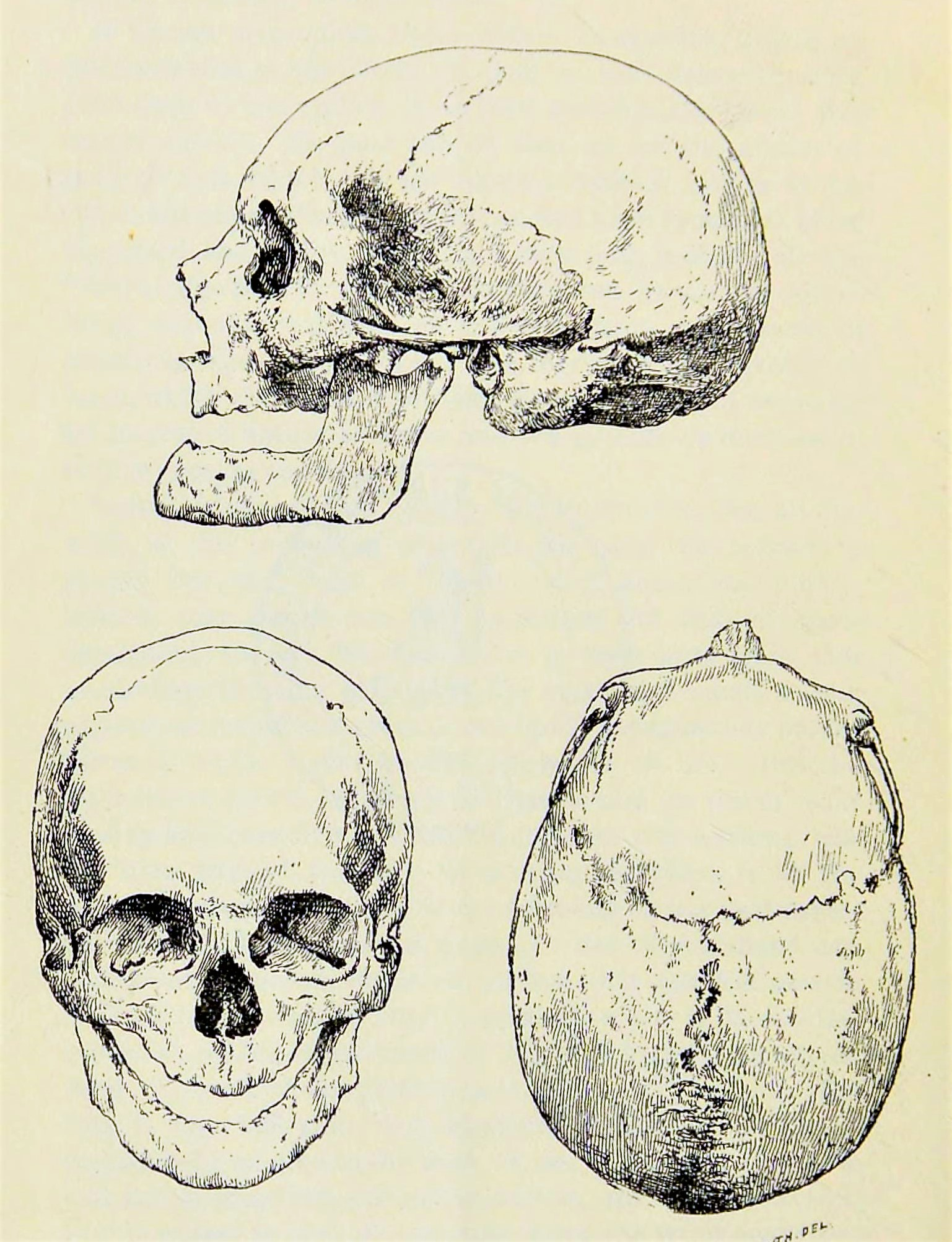
Browne's skull, as illustrated in Charles Williams's The Measurements of the Skull of Sir Thomas Browne (1895)

Browne died on 19 October 1682, his 77th birthday. He was buried in the chancel of St Peter Mancroft, Norwich. His skull was removed when his lead coffin was accidentally reopened by workmen in 1840. It was not re-interred in St Peter Mancroft until 4 July 1922, when it was recorded in the burial register as aged 317 years. Browne's coffin plate, which was stolen the same time as his skull, was also eventually recovered, broken into two halves, one of which is on display at St Peter Mancroft. Alluding to the commonplace opus of alchemy, it reads, Amplissimus Vir Dns. Thomas Browne, Miles, Medicinae Dr., Annos Natus 77 Denatus 19 Die mensis Octobris, Anno. Dni. 1682, hoc Loculo indormiens. Corporis Spagyrici pulvere plumbum in aurum Convertit. — translated from Latin as "The esteemed Gentleman Thomas Browne, Knight, Doctor of Medicine, 77 years old, died on the 19th of October in the year of Our Lord 1682 and lies sleeping in this coffin. With the dust of his alchemical body he converts lead into gold". The origin of the invented word spagyrici is from the Greek spao to tear open + ageiro to collect, a signature neologism coined by Paracelsus to define his medicine-oriented alchemy; the origins of iatrochemistry, being first advanced by him.

Browne's coffin-plate verse, along with the collected works of Paracelsus and several followers of the Swiss physician listed in his library, is evidence that although sometimes highly critical of Paracelsus, nevertheless, like the 'Luther of Medicine', he believed in palingenesis, physiognomy, alchemy, astrology and the kabbalah.

The Library of Sir Thomas Browne was held in the care of his eldest son Edward until 1708. The auction of Browne and his son Edward's libraries in January 1711 was attended by Hans Sloane. Editions from the library were subsequently included in the founding collection of the British Library.

== Autobiography ==
On 14 March 1673, Browne sent a short autobiography to the antiquarian John Aubrey, presumably for Aubrey's collection of Brief Lives, which provides an introduction to his life and writings:

...I was born in St Michael's Cheap in London, went to school at Winchester College, then went to Oxford, spent some years in foreign parts, was admitted to be a Socius Honorarius (Note: Honorary fellow) of the College of Physicians in London, Knighted September 1671, when the King, (Note: Charles II of England) Queen and Court came to Norwich. [Wrote] Religio Medici in English, which was since translated into Latin, French, Italian, High and Low Dutch. (Note: German and Dutch or Flemish)

Pseudodoxia Epidemica, or Enquiries into Common and Vulgar Errors translated into Dutch four or five years ago.

Hydriotaphia, or Urn Buriall.

Hortus Cyri [the Garden of Cyrus], or de Quincunce.

Have some miscellaneous tracts which may be published...

== Literary influence ==
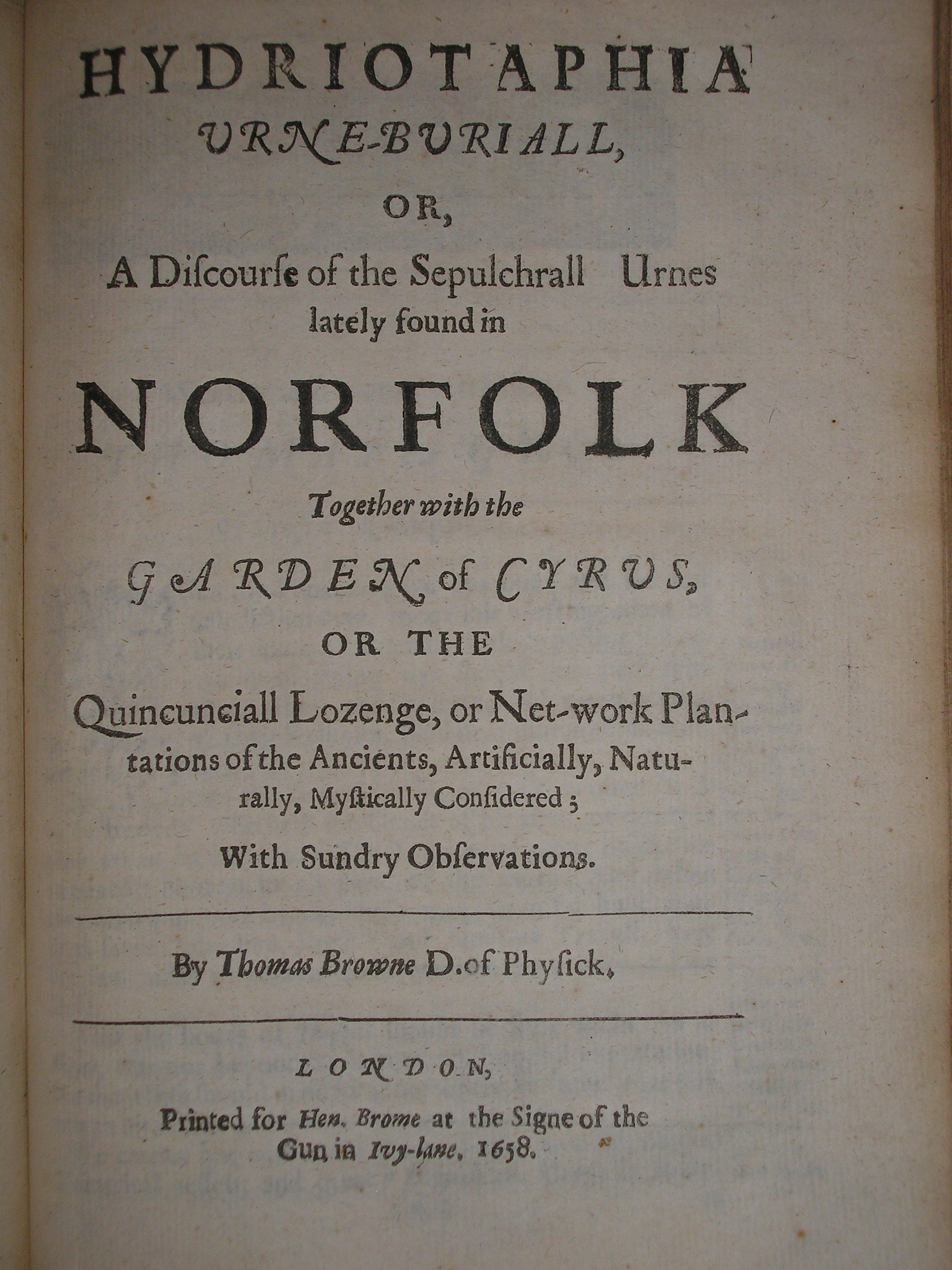
Title page of 1658 edition of Urn-Burial together with The Garden of Cyrus

Browne is widely considered one of the most original writers in the English language. The freshness and ingenuity of his mind invested everything he touched with interest; while on more important subjects, his style, if frequently ornate and Latinate, often rises to the highest pitch of stately eloquence. He has a paradoxical and ambiguous place in the history of ideas, as equally a devout Christian, a promoter of the new inductive science, and an adherent of ancient esoteric learning. For these reasons, one literary critic succinctly assessed him as "an instance of scientific reason lit up by mysticism in the Church of England". However, the complexity of Browne's labyrinthine thought processes, his highly stylised language, his many allusions to Biblical, Classical and contemporary learning, along with esoteric authors, are each contributing factors to why he remains obscure, little-read, and, thus, misunderstood.

A master neologist, Browne appears at number 69 in the Oxford English Dictionary's list of top-cited sources. He is quoted in a total of 4131 entries in the OED, including 775 citations as the first evidence of a word and 1596 as first evidence of a particular meaning of a word. Examples of his coinages, many of which are of a scientific or medical nature, include 'ambidextrous', 'analogous', 'anomalous', 'antediluvian', 'approximate', 'ascetic', 'carnivorous', 'coexistence', 'coma', 'compensate', 'computer', 'cryptography', 'cylindrical', 'disruption', 'electricity', 'ergotisms', 'exhaustion', 'ferocious', 'follicle', 'generator', 'gymnastic', 'hallucination', 'herbaceous', 'holocaust', 'indigenous', 'insecurity', 'jocularity', 'literary', 'locomotion', 'medical', 'migrant', 'mucous', 'prairie', 'precocious', 'polarity', 'prostate', 'pubescent', 'suicide', 'therapeutic', 'ulterior', 'ultimate' and 'veterinarian'.

The influence of his literary style spans four centuries. In the 19th century, Browne's reputation was revived by the Romantics. Thomas De Quincey, Samuel Taylor Coleridge, and Charles Lamb (who considered himself the rediscoverer of Browne) were all admirers. Carlyle was also influenced by him.

The composer William Alwyn wrote a symphony in 1973 based upon the rhythmical cadences of Browne's literary work Hydriotaphia, Urn Burial.

The Argentinian writer Jorge Luis Borges alluded to Browne throughout his literary writings, from his first publication, Fervor de Buenos Aires (1923) until his last years. He described Browne as "the best prose writer in the English language".

Throughout his 1995 novel The Rings of Saturn, German academic and writer W. G. Sebald makes repeated reference to Browne's life, works and remains.

== Recognition ==
In the 18th century, Samuel Johnson, who shared Browne's love of the Latinate, wrote a brief Life in which he praised Browne as a faithful Christian and assessed his prose.

The English author Virginia Woolf wrote two short essays about him, observing in 1923, "Few people love the writings of Sir Thomas Browne, but those who do are the salt of the earth."

Clive James included an essay on Browne in his Cultural Amnesia collection. James celebrated Browne's style and originality, stating that Browne was "minting new coin" with everything he wrote.

== Portraits and influence in the visual arts ==
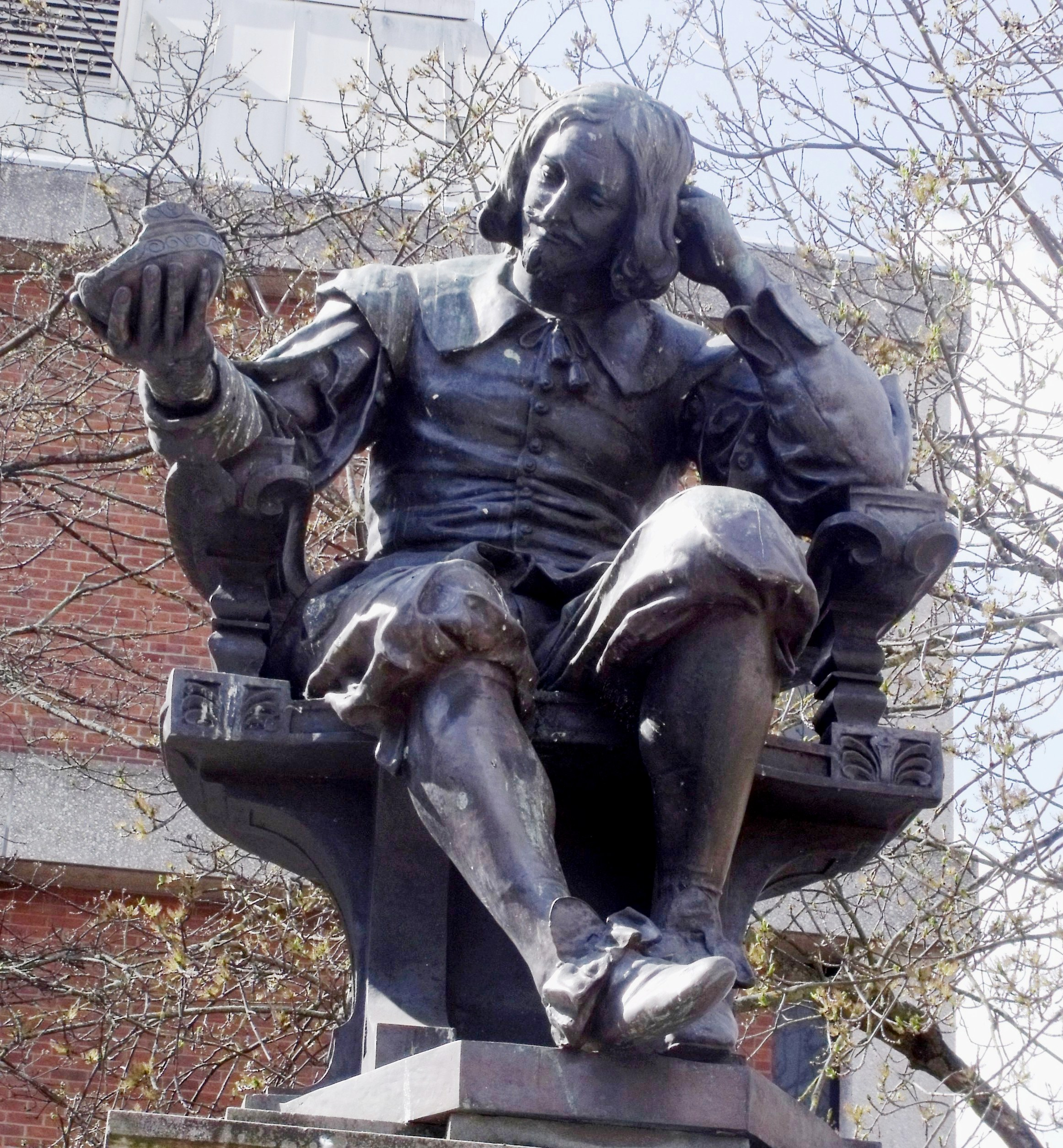
Statue of Browne in Norwich

The National Portrait Gallery in London has a contemporary portrait by Joan Carlile of Sir Thomas Browne and his wife Dorothy, probably completed between 1641 and 1650.

More recent sculptural portraits include Henry Alfred Pegram's 1905 statue in Norwich of Sir Thomas contemplating an urn. This statue occupies the central position in the Haymarket beside St Peter Mancroft, not far from the site of his house. Unveiled on 19 October 1905, it was moved from its original position in 1973 and once more in 2023.

- In 1931, the English painter Paul Nash was invited to illustrate a book of his own choice. Nash chose Sir Thomas Browne's Urn Burial and The Garden of Cyrus, providing the publisher with a set of 32 illustrations to accompany Browne's Discourses. The edition was published in 1932. A pencil drawing by Nash called "Urne Buriall: Teeth, Bones and Hair" is held by Birmingham Museums Trust.
- In 2005, a small standing figure in silver and bronze, commissioned for the 400th anniversary of Browne's birth, was sculpted by Robert Mileham.
- In 2016, the artists Peter Rodulfo and Mark Burrell elected Browne as honorary Great-Grandfather of the North Sea Magical Realists art-movement. Simultaneously, they realised in painting items taken from Browne's Musaeum Clausum in its Rarities in Pictures section.

== Publications ==
- Religio Medici (1642; authorised in 1643)
- Pseudodoxia Epidemica (1646)
- Hydriotaphia, Urn Burial (1658)
- The Garden of Cyrus (1658)
- A Letter to a Friend (1690)
- Christian Morals (1716)
- Musaeum Clausum Tract 13 from Miscellaneous Tracts (1684)

== See also ==
- Neoplatonism
- Hermeticism
- Library of Sir Thomas Browne

== Sources ==
- Abbott, Mary (1996). Life Cycles in England, 1560–1720: Cradle to Grave. Psychology Press. ISBN 9780415108430.
- Barbour, Reid (2013). Sir Thomas Browne: A Life. Oxford: Oxford University Press. ISBN 978-01996-7-988-1.
- Breathnach, Caoimhghín S. (2005). "Sir Thomas Browne (1605–1682)". Journal of the Royal Society of Medicine. 98 (1): 33–36. doi:10.1177/014107680509800115. PMC 1079241. PMID 15632239.
- Dunn, William Parmly (1950). Sir Thomas Browne: A Study in Religious Philosophy. University of Minnesota Press. ISBN 978-08166-5-751-3
- Huntley, Frank Livingston (1968). Sir Thomas Browne, A Biographical and Critical Study. The University of Michigan Press. OCLC 23338778.
- Leonard, Alice, and Sarah E. Parker, '"Put a Mark on the Errors": Seventeenth Century Medicine and Science', History of Science, 61 (3), 2023, 287–307
- McNeillie, Andrew (1988). The Essays of Virginia Woolf, Volume III, 1919-1924. New York: Harcourt Brace Jovanovich. ISBN 0-15-129057-1.
- Preston, Claire (1995). Sir Thomas Browne: Selected Writings. Manchester: Carcanet. ISBN 978-1-85754-690-3.
- Principe, Lawrence M. (2013). The Secrets of Alchemy. Chicago: University of Chicago Press. ISBN 978-0226103792.
- Robbins, R. H. (2004). "Browne, Sir Thomas". In Watt, Norma (ed.). Oxford Dictionary of National Biography (online ed.). Oxford: Oxford University Press. doi:10.1093/ref:odnb/3702. (Subscription, Wikipedia Library access or UK public library membership required.)
- Sencourt, Robert (1925). Outflying Philosophy: A Literary Study of the Religious Element in the Poems and Letters of John Donne and in the Works of Sir Thomas Browne. Ardent Media. OCLC 2337758.
- Thomas, Keith (1971). Religion and the Decline of Magic: Studies in Popular Beliefs in Sixteenth and Seventeenth Century England. London: Penguin Books. ISBN 978-0-14-013744-6.
- Williams, Charles (1902). The Pedigree of Sir Thomas Browne. Norwich: s.n. OCLC 970772143.
