= Pseudodoxia Epidemica =

1646 work by Thomas Browne

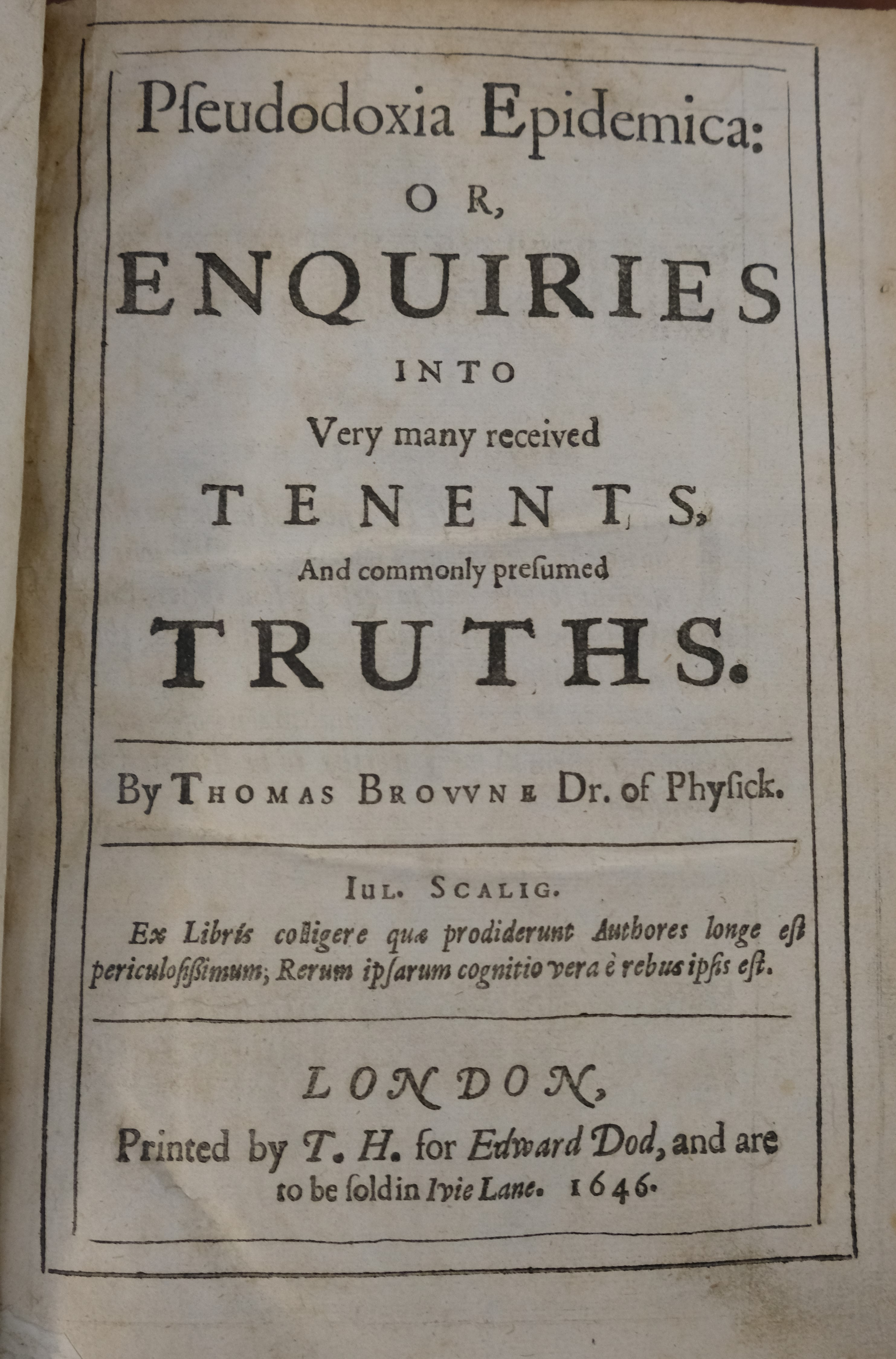
Title page of a 1646 copy of Thomas Browne's Pseudodoxia Epidemica, or Vulgar Errors

Pseudodoxia Epidemica: or, Enquiries into very many received tenents and commonly presumed truths, also known simply as Pseudodoxia Epidemica or Vulgar Errors, is a work by the English polymath Thomas Browne, challenging and refuting the "vulgar" or common errors and superstitions of his own historical era. It first appeared in 1646 and went through five subsequent editions, the last revision occurring in 1672. The work includes evidence of Browne's adherence to the Baconian method of empirical observation of nature, and was in the vanguard of work-in-progress scientific journalism during the 17th-century Scientific Revolution. Throughout its pages, frequent examples of Browne's subtle humour can also be found.

Browne's three determinants for obtaining truth were the authority of past scholarly works, the act of reason, and empirical experience. Each of these determinants is employed upon subjects ranging from common folklore to cosmology. Subjects covered in Pseudodoxia Epidemica are arranged in accordance to the time-honoured Renaissance scale of creation; the learned doctor essaying on the nature of error itself (Book 1), continuing with fallacies in the mineral, vegetable (Book 2), and animal (Book 3) kingdoms onto errors concerning Man (Book 4), Art (Book 5), Geography and History (Book 6), and finally Astronomy and the Cosmos (Book 7).

In the process of describing the science of his era, Browne introduced a number of neologisms in his works. Among the neologisms introduced in the book are the terms electricity, medical, pathology, hallucination, literary, and computer.

== Popular science ==
Pseudodoxia Epidemica was a valuable source of information which found itself upon the shelves of many homes in seventeenth-century England. Being in the vanguard of the scientific writing, it paved the way for much subsequent popular scientific journalism and began a decline in the belief in mythical creatures. Its science includes many examples of Browne's 'at-first-hand' empiricism as well as early examples of the formulation of scientific hypothesis.

The second of Pseudodoxia Epidemica's seven books entitled Tenets concerning Mineral and Vegetable Bodies includes Browne's experiments with static electricity and magnetism—the word electricity being one of hundreds of neologisms contributed by Browne into the vocabulary of the early Scientific Revolution.

== Editions ==
The popularity of Pseudodoxia in its day is confirmed by the fact that it went through no fewer than six editions. The first appeared in 1646 during the reign of Charles I and during the English Civil War; four during the interregnum, in 1650, 1658 (two), and 1659; and the final edition in 1672, during the reign of Charles II, and when the Scientific Revolution was well under way. Pseudodoxia was subsequently translated and published in French, Dutch, Latin and German throughout the late seventeenth and early eighteenth centuries. The German Christian Cabalist Christian Knorr von Rosenroth translated the book into German in 1680.

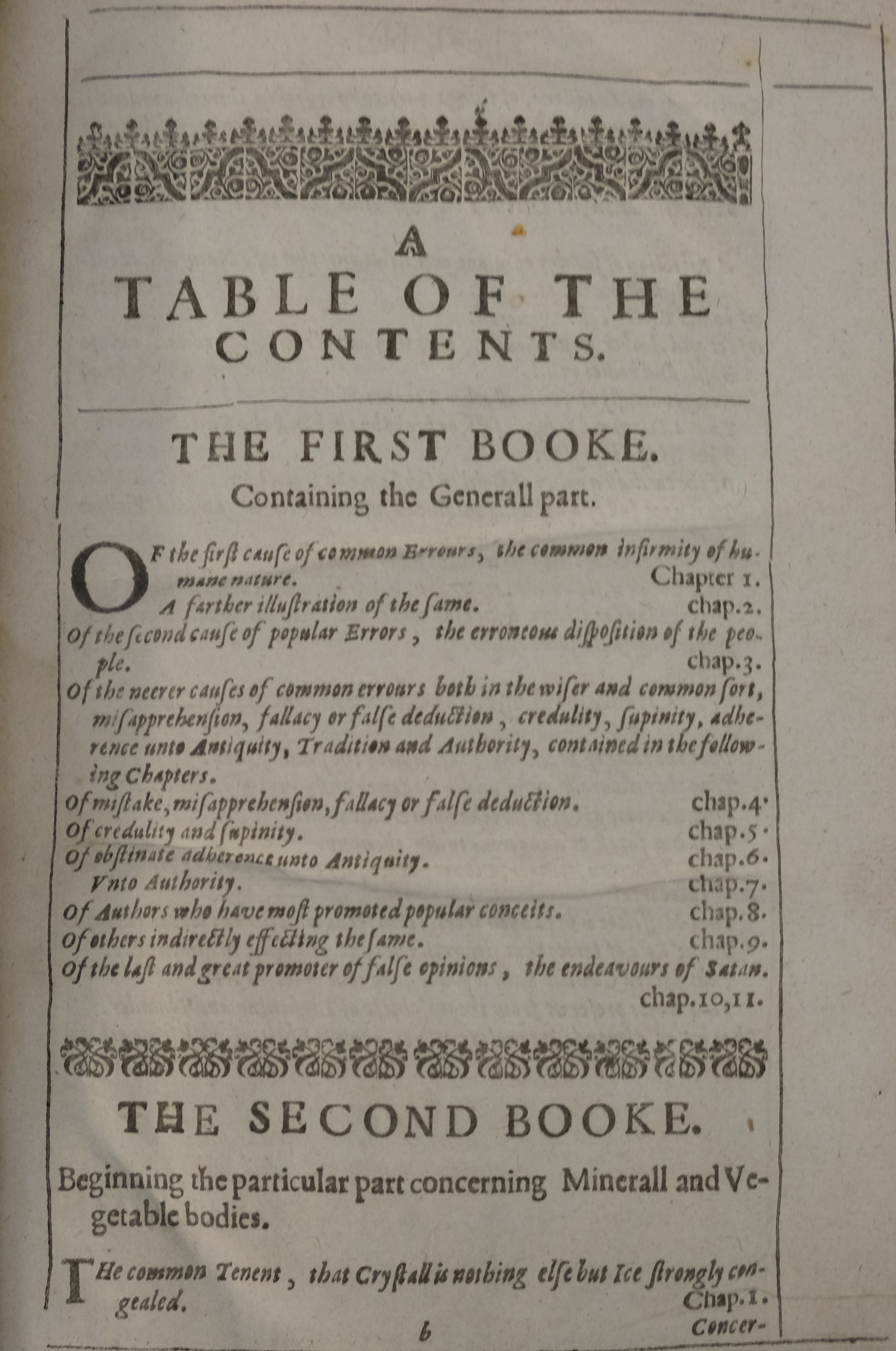
Table of contents page for the 1646 copy of Pseudodoxia Epidemica, or Vulgar Errors

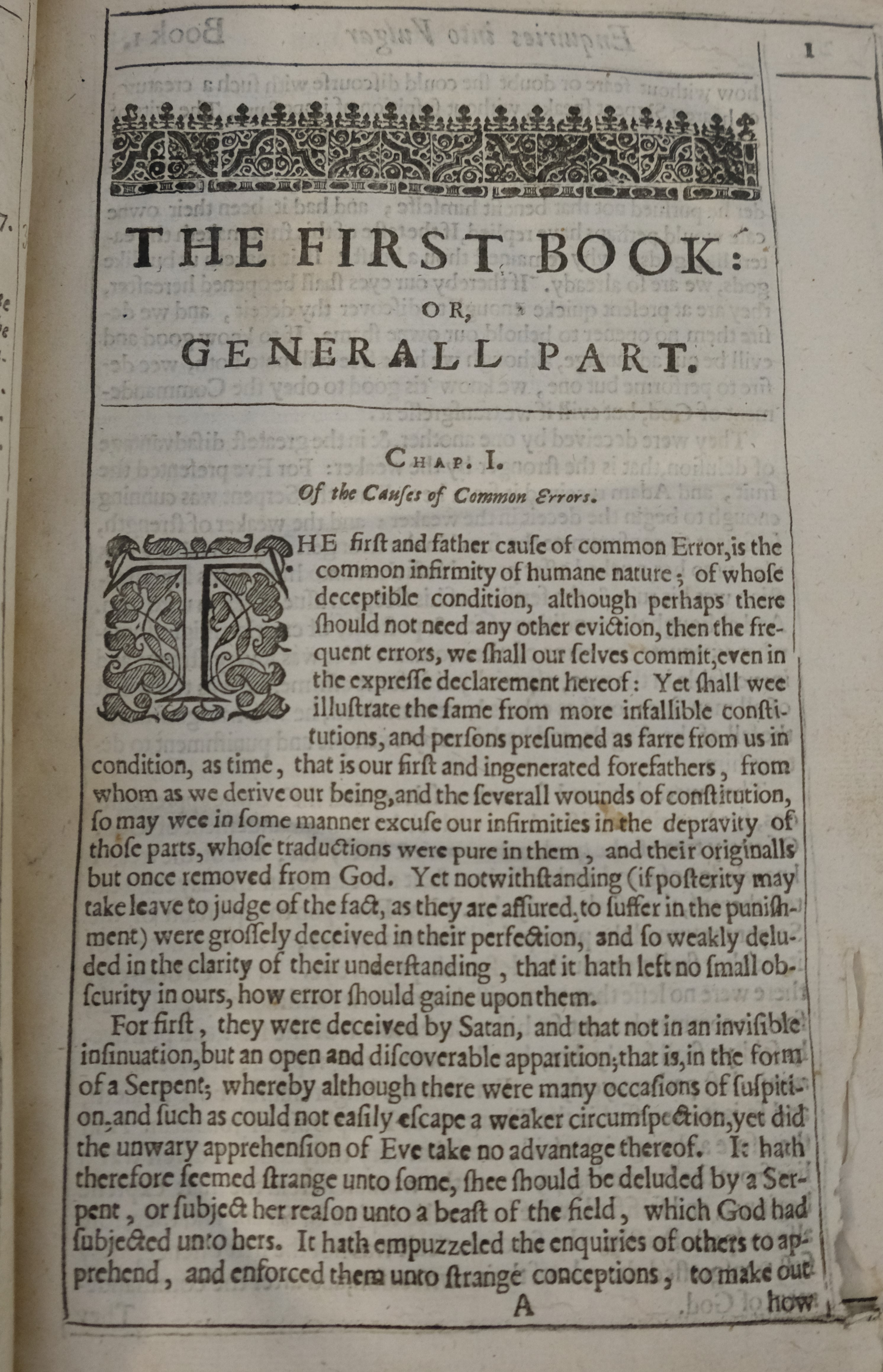
First page of the 1646 copy of Pseudodoxia Epidemica, or Vulgar Errors

== Evaluation by other writers ==
Today there is considerable confusion about how best to define Sir Thomas Browne's scientific methodology, which is described by E. S. Merton thus:

The eclecticism so characteristic of Browne... Browne does not cry from the house tops, as did Francis Bacon, the liberating power of experience in opposition to the sterilising influence of reason. Nor does he guarantee as did Descartes, the intuitive truth of reason as opposed to the falsity of the senses. Unlike either, he follows both sense experience and a priori reason in his quest for truth. He uses what comes to him from tradition and from contemporary Science, often perhaps without too precise a formulation.

— Merton, E. S. (1948). "Sir Thomas Browne's Scientific Quest". Journal of the History of Medicine and Allied Sciences. 3 (2): 214–228. ISSN 0022-5045.

William P. Dunn summarised the ambiguities of Browne's scientific view-point thus:

Here is Browne's scientific point of view in a nutshell. One lobe of his brain wants to study facts and test hypotheses on the basis of them, the other is fascinated by mystic symbols and analogies.

Robert Sencourt succinctly defined Browne's relationship to scientific enquiry as "an instance of a scientific reason, lit up by mysticism, in the Church of England".

The 1651 book Arcana Microcosmi, by Alexander Ross, attempted to rebut many of Browne's claims.

== See also ==
- Library of Sir Thomas Browne
- Francis Bacon
- Naturalis Historia
- Popular science
