= Ghostgirl =

2008 novel by Tonya Hurley

ghostgirl
- Cover of ghostgirl
- Author: Tonya Hurley
- Cover artist: Alison Impey
- Language: English Spanish German
- Genre: Young adult
- Publisher: Little, Brown and Company
- Publication date: August 2008
- Publication place: United States
- Media type: Print (hardcover), audiobook
- Pages: 336 pp (first edition)
- ISBN: 978-0-316-11357-1
- OCLC: 171613331
- Followed by: ghostgirl: Homecoming

ghostgirl is the debut novel from author and filmmaker Tonya Hurley. It is the story of high school senior "Charlotte Usher", The young teenager dreams of becoming popular in school, but before she gets the chance of that OR asking Damen out, she dies from choking on a gummy bear. The young adult novel was published on August 1, 2008, by Little, Brown and Company, and hit the New York Times Bestseller list, Chapter Books, on September 14, 2008. ghostgirl has been printed in several different languages around the world, including Spanish and French. It was followed by a sequel in July 2009 called ghostgirl: Homecoming, and a third book, ghostgirl: Lovesick was released in July 2010.

The audiobook releases of ghostgirl (released August 2009) and ghostgirl: Homecoming (released November 2009), from Recorded Books in 2009, are read by actress Parker Posey and feature a score by Vince Clarke of Erasure fame.

== Characters ==
- Charlotte Usher (also called ghostgirl) – the protagonist of the novel, a senior in High school. She has a crush on Damen, and plans to be with him, but chokes to death on a gummy bear before carrying it out. She becomes a ghost after her death.
- Damen Dylan – Charlotte's crush and Petula's boyfriend.
- Petula Kensington – Damen's girlfriend.
- Scarlet Kensington – Petula's sister. A gothic teenager, and the only one who can see Charlotte as a ghost.
- Wendy Anderson and Wendy Thomas aka The Wendys – Petula's two best friends, cheerleaders who share the same first name and brain and do everything together.
- Dead Ed class – A group of dead teenagers who become Charlotte's new classmates:
  - Prue or Prudence Shelly – The leader of the dead teenagers. She wants to move on, and thinks Charlotte is shallow and selfish for not helping her classmates. She also belittles Charlotte's obsession with popularity, as she was murdered by a popular boy on the way to a school dance.
  - Piccolo Pam – A friendly ghost who introduces Charlotte to Dead Ed. Died by choking on her piccolo during a concert solo.
  - Mr Brain – The class teacher and only adult in Dead Ed. Named because a large portion of his skull is missing.
  - Metal Mike – A boy with earbud headphones who died listening to metal music his driving test.
  - Call Me Kim – A girl with several phones who died from radiation from her mobile.
  - DJ – A DJ killed in a gang fight at a party, caused by his refusal to play popular music.
  - Deadhead Jerry – A ghost of a hippie boy who died by choking on a cigarette by mistake.
  - Abigail – The ghost girl who died of drowning.
  - Suzy Scratcher – A scar-covered girl who died from a staph infection after self-harming with shallow cuts.
  - CoCo – A fashion-obsessed girl who drowned after passing out in a vomit-filled handbag.
  - Simon and Simone – Dead twins who tried to out-emo each other.
  - Buzz Saw Bud – A boy who died in a woodwork accident.
  - Silent Violet – A girl who never speaks, who is later revealed to have gossiped in her previous life, which led to her death.
  - Rotting Rita – A visiting German ghost who can produce insects.

== ghostgirl: Homecoming ==
Having graduated, Charlotte is told that she and the other ghosts from "Dead Ed" need to work in a phone bank, where they will answer calls from troubled teenagers in need of advice, acting as the teens' consciences. Before starting, the other ghosts receive 'graduation presents': they are reunited with lost loved ones or dead celebrity idols, and receive spacious apartments. However, Charlotte does not meet her dead parents and must live in a cramped dormitory, and at work she is the only ghost not to receive calls. Feeling left out, she begins to ignore her old friends and spends all her time with Maddy, her dormitory roommate and new co-worker, oblivious to the fact that Maddy is sabotaging her attempts to succeed.

Meanwhile, Scarlet is feeling insecure about her long-distance relationship with Damen just as Petula, who is repeating her senior year, goes into a coma after contracting staph from a pedicure. Feeling guilty, and jealous of Damen's sudden arrival to see Petula, Scarlet uses the possession ritual Charlotte taught her to send herself into a coma and seek out Charlotte's help to find Petula's soul. Instead, Scarlet joins the new Dead Ed class, who help her to move on using "Early Decision", a risky shortcut. Meanwhile, Petula finds herself in a waiting room, accompanied by another coma patient, Virginia Johnson, a young beauty pageant contestant who is disdainful of Petula's fashion obsession, and wants to grow old normally. Gradually, the two begin to bond.

Scarlet arrives at Charlotte's dormitory, much to her delight, and they sneak out to find Petula, accompanied by Maddy. However, after a disagreement at a fork in the road, Charlotte and Maddy leave Scarlet on her own. However, Pam and Prue have come after Charlotte, and they meet up with Scarlet and help her to find Petula's soul by getting directions from Green Gary to the hospital intake office. Meanwhile, Damen is desperately trying to revive Scarlet, and he decides to take Petula to Homecoming in the hope of reanimating her, and therefore ending Scarlet's quest. Maddy and Charlotte follow as Maddy tries to convince Charlotte to possess Petula.

Just as Charlotte is about to complete the possession ritual, Scarlet, Pam and Prue arrive to stop her, and explain that Maddy is a murderous soul from hell attempting to turn Charlotte astray so she can "graduate" her own way. Charlotte explains that she had suspected Maddy the whole time, and had intentionally made Pam and Prue suspicious so that they could help her and Charlotte. Charlotte defeats Maddy, and reassures Scarlet that Damen is only helping Petula for Scarlet's sake.

The group find Petula's soul, just as Virginia dies, and Charlotte accompanies her to Dead Ed. Petula awakes at Homecoming, and Damen quickly leaves to find Scarlet at the hospital, where they reconcile. Charlotte returns to her job at the phone bank, and is finally accepted and reunited with her parents.

== ghostgirl: Lovesick ==
Charlotte has finally settled into the afterlife and has a dead boyfriend - Eric. As the class are expecting to move on, they receive one more task: to help a 15-year-old in Hawthorne through their troubles in time for Prom. Pam and Prue are assigned to the Wendys, CoCo to Petula, Charlotte to Damen and Eric to Scarlet.

Scarlet feels out of place as she is leaving her goth fashions behind for a new, more mature look. While this is her choice, she feels Damen pushed her into it, and that he does not accept her for who she is. When Damen arrives in town for a job at the local radio station and enters one of Scarlet's songs, she feels that he is pressuring her and getting to be mad and furious. When she meets Eric, not realising he is dead, she is attracted to him, and feels he allows her to be her true self.

Meanwhile, Petula's coma has left her feeling uncharacteristically philanthropic, and she has begun to donate her old clothes to the homeless, confusing the Wendys. A new girl called Darcy begins to steal her status, holding a mock trial which ends in Petula being made an outcast. She continues with her charity, hoping that her makeovers will improve the lives of those she helps and wishing for more contact from Virginia. This leads her to ask a homeless boy to attend Prom with her.

When Scarlet's song is disqualified because of Damen's involvement in the entry, the pair began be disagreement and break up. Charlotte also having a disagreement with Eric over his relationship with Scarlet. Irritated, Charlotte attempts to return to the afterlife through the Dead Ed classroom, and discovers Darcy's ghost is in the new Dead Ed class after having a seizure brought on by a camera flash, and that the Darcy in the school is being possessed by someone else. With Pam and Prue, Charlotte plans to evict the evil spirit at Prom. Meanwhile, Darcy asks Damen to Prom, and Scarlet and Eric spend more time together. After they re-record Scarlet's song for the radio competition, Scarlet learns that Eric is dead, and that he never had the chance to play on stage when he was alive.

Scarlet wins the radio competition and chooses as her prize to perform her song at Prom, which she redecorates as a Fantasy Funeral for Charlotte. As Damen and Darcy have their picture taken, Charlotte sabotages the camera to give Darcy another seizure, which evicts Maddy's spirit and reanimates the real Darcy. Because Maddy technically died from the seizure, she must now attend Dead Ed, while Darcy awakens confused and with no memory of the Wendys or anything else about Hawthorne High.

Petula arrives at Prom with her homeless boyfriend, who turns out to be a billionaire in disguise, and the pair are crowned Prom King and Queen. CoCo's work completed, Petula receives a new guardian angel - Virginia. Meanwhile, Eric and Scarlet perform onstage together before Damen and Scarlet reunite, and Eric and Charlotte dance together. After the Prom, Charlotte and Scarlet say goodbye in the graveyard, and Charlotte returns to the afterlife, where she introduces Eric to her parents. The Dead Ed class all move on except for Charlotte, who is given Mr Brain's job as the new Dead Ed teacher.

== Themes ==
The main themes explored in ghostgirl are popularity, obsession, love and death. The author has said that, although the book contains some elements of horror, she would describe it as a romance.

== Critical reception ==
The book received starred reviews from such literary publications as VOYA (Voice of Youth Advocates), Publishers Weekly, Kirkus Reviews and School Library Journal. It received generally favourable reviews, although some sites raised concerns over the use of language. The book also reached tenth on the New York Times Best Seller list.

== Character development ==
ghostgirl began as a character on the website ghostgirl.com, and then was developed into a novel in March 2008. She is based on the author's experience of working with teenage celebrities and her observations on fame and popularity.

== Structure ==
The cover art shows the silhouette of a girl – used throughout the book's illustrations to represent Charlotte – in a coffin with a banner saying "Rest in Popularity". The title "ghostgirl" is the name used to refer to Charlotte after her death. The book is unusual in that the pages' proportion of height to width is much larger than usual, making it taller and thinner than most novels.

Inside the book, each chapter begins with a full-page illustration, including a quotation and a border of black and pink roses. The illustration usually shows Charlotte's silhouette, as shown on the cover, and forms a chain of actions as the reader progresses through the book. The page afterwards includes a short summary paragraph of a lesson Charlotte learns in the chapter, written in reverse color. The book's pages are edged with a black and pink floral border, which changes from chapter to chapter, and all illustrations within the book are in these two colours.

ghostgirl: Homecoming's is similarly laid out, but with slightly different floral borders, and purple replacing pink in the color scheme. The pages are also edged in purple. Also, the illustrations do not include a quotation and do not form a chain – each is separate. The cover displays Charlotte's face in a mirror, and is highly stylised.

ghostgirl: Lovesick is similar to both books. The difference is the color of the front is red. Its front cover is a heart shaped locket with Charlotte blowing a kiss and a heart on her hand. The illustrations include a quotation and before the beginning of each chapter, it speaks of the lesson learned in each chapter.
