= Colin Dickey =

American writer

Colin Dickey (born September 3, 1977) is an American author, curator, and critic whose work deals with ghosts, death, and haunting, and explores how these symbols function as metaphors. He was the managing director of the Morbid Anatomy Museum and is a member of The Order of the Good Death. He currently teaches at National University.

== Books ==
- The Unidentified: Mythical Monsters, Alien Encounters, and Our Obsession With the Unexplained
- Ghostland (2016), an exploration of America's haunted mansions.
  - Tiya Miles, writing in The New York Times, calls Ghostland "a capacious geographical synthesis that is both intellectually intriguing and politically instructive."
  - NPR named Ghostland one of the best books of 2016
  - Dickey appeared on All Things Considered, where he spoke about the Winchester Mystery House
- The Morbid Anatomy Anthology (co-edited with Joanna Ebenstein), a collection of works by "scholars, artists and writers working along the intersections of the history of anatomy and medicine, death and the macabre, religion and spectacle."
- Afterlives of the Saints: Stories from the Ends of Faith
- Cranioklepty: Grave Robbing and the Search for Genius, stories of notable grave robberies, including Haydn and Beethoven
- Failure! Experiments in Aesthetic and Social Practices (edited with Nicole Antebi and Robby Herbst)

== References in popular culture ==
- A quote from Ghostland appears in Robert Greene's upcoming film Bisbee '17.
- Musician Dave Heumann cites Dickey as one of his literary influences.

== Education ==
Dickey has an MFA in Critical Studies from California Institute of the Arts, and a PhD in Comparative Literature from the University of Southern California.
