= Religio Medici =

1643 psychological self-portrait by Sir Thomas Browne

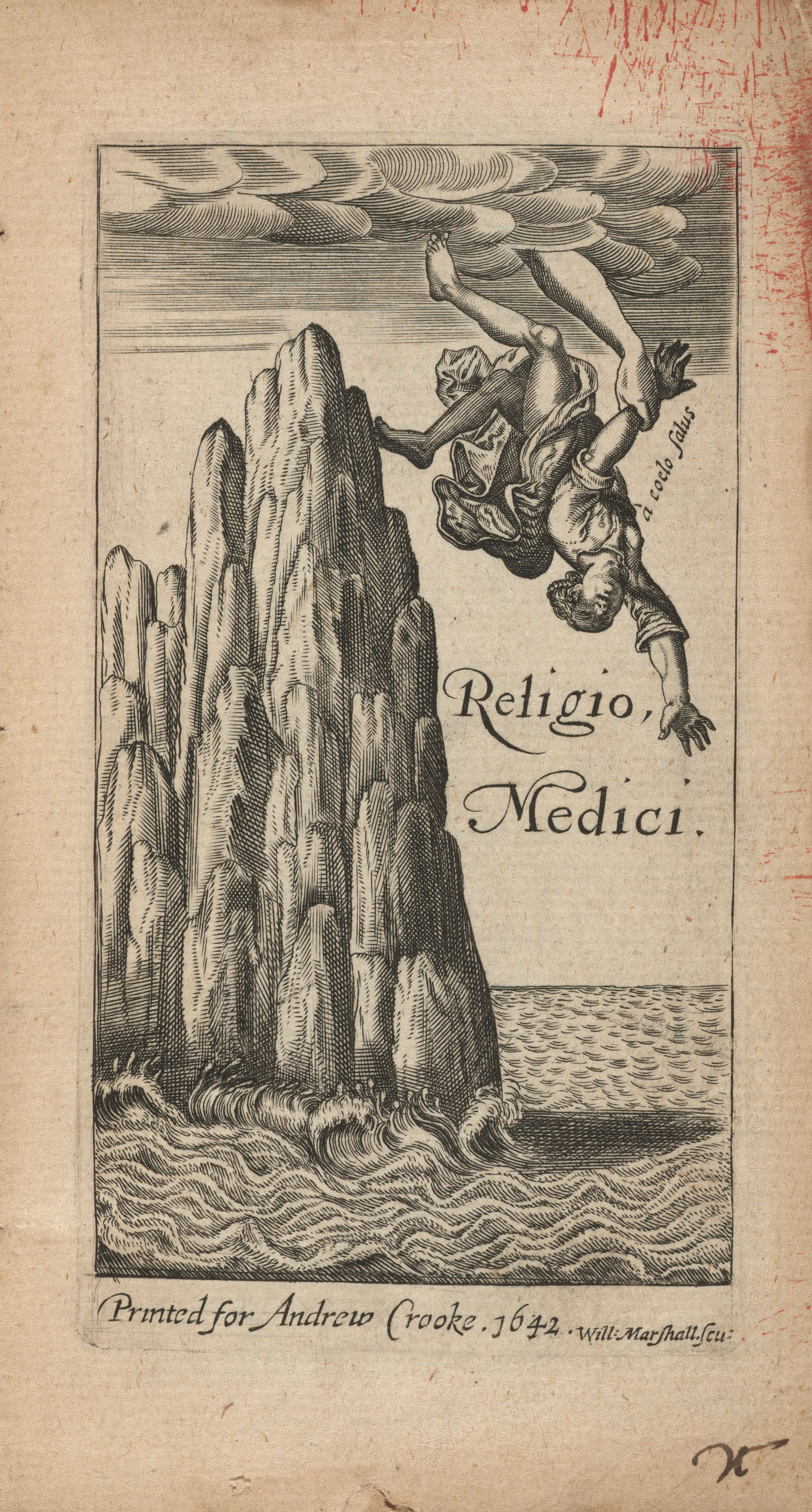
Frontispiece of the 1642 unauthorised edition of Religio Medici

Religio Medici (The Religion of a Physician) by the English polymath Sir Thomas Browne is a spiritual testament and early psychological self-portrait. Browne mulls over the relation between his medical profession and his Christian faith. Published in 1643 after an unauthorised version was distributed the previous year, it became a European best-seller which brought its author fame at home and abroad. It likely contains the first known English language reference to Zoroastrianism. It was translated into Latin, French, German, Dutch and Italian and was reprinted about eight times during the author's life-time. It speaks on the themes of the religion of a physician arguing that physicians are not atheists and that religion is not incompatible with science.

== Themes ==
=== Religion ===
Structured upon the Christian virtues of Faith and Hope (part 1) and Charity (part 2), Browne expresses his beliefs in the doctrine of sola fide, the existence of hell, the Last Judgment, the resurrection and other tenets of Christianity.

=== Science and religion ===
Throughout Religio Medici Browne uses scientific imagery to illustrate religious tenets as part of his discussion on the relationship of science to religion.

== Reception and influence ==
A rare surviving contemporary review by Guy Patin, a distinguished member of the Parisian medical faculty, indicates the considerable impact Religio Medici had upon the intelligentsia abroad:

A new little volume has arrived from Holland entitled Religio Medici written by an Englishman and translated into Latin by some Dutchman. It is a strange and pleasant book, but very delicate and wholly mystical; the author is not lacking in wit and you will see in him quaint and delightful thoughts. There are hardly any books of this sort. If scholars were permitted to write freely we would learn many novel things, never has there been a newspaper comparable to this; in this way the subtlety of the human spirit could be revealed.

Throughout the seventeenth century Religio Medici spawned numerous imitative titles, including John Dryden's great poem, Religio Laici, but none matched the frank, intimate tone of the original in which Browne shares his thoughts, as well as the idiosyncrasies of his personality with his reader.

Samuel Pepys in his Diary transcribed William Petty's opinion that the Religio was "cried up to the whole world for its wit and learning" but "the wit lie in confirming some pretty sayings, which are generally like paradoxes, by some argument smartly and pleasantly argued".

A translation into German of the Religio was made in 1746 and an early admirer of Browne's spiritual testament was Goethe's one-time associate Lavater.

In the early nineteenth century Religio Medici was "re-discovered" by the English Romantics. Charles Lamb introduced it to Samuel Taylor Coleridge, who after reading it, exclaimed, "O to write a character of this man!"

Thomas de Quincey in his Confessions of an English Opium-Eater also praised it, stating:

I do not recollect more than one thing said adequately on the subject of music in all literature. It is a passage in Religio Medici of Sir T. Browne, and though chiefly remarkable for its sublimity, has also a philosophical value, inasmuch as it points to the true theory of musical effects.

The book strongly influenced the prominent physician William Osler in his early years. Osler, who is considered the "father of modern medicine", is said to have learned it by heart.

In Virginia Woolf's opinion Religio Medici paved the way for all future confessionals, private memoirs and personal writings.

In the twentieth century, the Swiss psychologist Carl Jung used the term Religio Medici several times in his writings.

== Literary allusions ==
Dorothy L. Sayers in her novel Gaudy Night has Harriet Vane discover that Peter Wimsey is reading Religio Medici. It helps her better understand his character and motivations.

Patricia Highsmith's novel Strangers on a Train references a Morocco-bound copy of the work, and Guy reflects on his favorite passages.

In Excellent Women by Barbara Pym, the sad, spinsterish church-lady Mildred Lathbury has a copy on her bedside table.

In the novel Contact by Carl Sagan, there is an epigraph taken from Religio I, 8 at the start of Chapter 7: "The Ethanol in W-3." "That heresies should arise..." seems to allude to the creation of millenarian sects that arise after hearing a message from space.

== Sources ==
- Grell, Ole Peter; Cunningham, Andrew (1996). Religio Medici: Medicine and Religion in Seventeenth-century England. Scolar Press. ISBN 9781859283394.
- Patin, Gui; Spon, Charles (1718). Nouvelles lettres de feu Mr. Gui Patin, tirées du cabinet de Mr. Charles Spon, contenant l'histoire du tems, et des particularitez sur la vie et sur les ecrits des savans de son siécle (in French). chez Steenhouwer et Uytwerf.
