= Charmed (2018 TV series) =

2018 American fantasy drama television series

- Genre: Drama; Fantasy; Supernatural fiction
- Based on: Charmed by Constance M. Burge
- Developed by: Jennie Snyder Urman & Jessica O'Toole & Amy Rardin
- Showrunners: Carter Covington (season 1); Liz Kruger & Craig Shapiro (seasons 2-3); Jeffrey Lieber, Joey Falco & Nicki Renna (season 4)
- Starring: Melonie Diaz; Madeleine Mantock; Sarah Jeffery; Ser'Darius Blain; Ellen Tamaki; Rupert Evans; Nick Hargrove; Jordan Donica; Poppy Drayton; Lucy Barrett
- Composers: Will Bates; John Paesano
- Country of origin: United States
- Original language: English
- No. of seasons: 4
- No. of episodes: 72 (list of episodes)

Production
- Executive producers: Jessica O'Toole; Amy Rardin; Howard T. Owens; Ben Silverman; Brad Silberling; Jennie Snyder Urman; Carter Covington; Jeffrey Lieber; Stuart Gillard; Liz Kruger; Craig Shapiro; Joey Falco; Nicki Renna; Lisa Towers; Kevin Dowling
- Production locations: Vancouver, British Columbia
- Cinematography: Tami Reiker; Joseph E. Gallagher; Ciarán Kavanagh; Bruce Worrall; Bruce Chun; Ciaran Kavanagh; Michael Wale
- Editors: Gregg Featherman; Tim Kinzy; George Pilkinton; Scott Boyd; Amanda Taylor; Brian Jonason; Lance Stubblefield
- Camera setup: Single-camera
- Running time: 40–43 minutes
- Production companies: Poppy Productions; Reveal Entertainment; Still Married Productions (seasons 2–4); Propagate; CBS Studios (Note: Credited as CBS Television Studios for seasons 1–2)

Original release
- Network: The CW
- Release: October 14, 2018 – June 10, 2022

Related
- Charmed (1998–2006)

Charmed is an American fantasy drama television series developed by Jennie Snyder Urman, Jessica O'Toole, and Amy Rardin. It is a reboot of the WB series of the same name, created by Constance M. Burge, which originally aired from 1998 to 2006. Charmed premiered in the United States on October 14, 2018, on the CW. Carter Covington served as showrunner for the first season, before married duo Liz Kruger and Craig Shapiro took over for the second and third seasons. Jeffrey Lieber, Joey Falco, and Nicki Renna replaced Kruger and Shapiro as showrunners for the fourth season.

The first three seasons follow the lives of sisters Macy (Madeleine Mantock), Mel (Melonie Diaz) and Maggie (Sarah Jeffery), who, after the death of their mother, discover they are the Charmed Ones, the most powerful trio of good witches destined to protect both innocent lives and the world from demons and other dark forces. Each sister has an individual magical power, which is noticeably stronger when all three sisters work together as the "Power of Three" to defeat their enemies. The sisters are aided by a Whitelighter, Harry Greenwood (Rupert Evans), an advisor who protects and guides witches.

The reboot is known for being more diverse than the original series by casting three women of color in the lead roles, and for its LGBT representation by making one of the sisters a lesbian. Urman explained that television viewers already "had a chance to see three white witches" on the original Charmed, and that she was adamant on developing a different version of the series in which people of color and the LGBT community could see themselves represented onscreen and "be the hero of the story". The reboot sparked controversy from some cast members and fans of the original Charmed; Holly Marie Combs and Alyssa Milano both criticized the CW's decision to reboot the series without any involvement from the original cast or crew, while fans campaigned via Twitter to stop the network from moving forward with the pilot episode.

The first season of Charmed, which aired on Sundays, helped the CW return to original programming on Sunday nights for the first time since the 2008–09 U.S. television season. Charmed was renewed for a fourth season in February 2021, which premiered on March 11, 2022. In May 2022, it was announced that the fourth season would be its final season.

== Premise ==
The series begins in the fictional college town of Hilltowne, Michigan, where sisters Mel (Melonie Diaz) and Maggie Vera (Sarah Jeffery) are living with their mother Marisol (Valerie Cruz), who shortly afterward is attacked and killed by an unknown dark force.

Three months later, Mel and Maggie discover that they have an older half-sister, Macy Vaughn (Madeleine Mantock), who was kept a secret by their mother for years but recently moved to Hilltowne for a new job at the local university the sisters attend. When Macy meets her sisters for the first time at the family's Vera Manor, lightning flashes and the house's power goes out, indicating the sisters' magical powers have been activated now that all three of them are together. Macy receives the power of telekinesis, middle sister Mel can freeze time, and Maggie, the youngest, can hear people's thoughts and feel their emotions.

Soon afterward, their Whitelighter—an advisor who protects and guides witches—Harry Greenwood (Rupert Evans) gathers all three sisters together in their attic; he reveals to the sisters that they are witches and presents them with their family's Book of Shadows – a spell book and guide to using the "Power of Three". Marisol had bound her daughters' powers when they were each born to protect them and let them live normal lives but was in the process of unbinding their powers on the night she was murdered. By the end of the first episode, Macy moves into the Vera Manor and the sisters ultimately accept their new destiny as the Charmed Ones, the most powerful trio of good witches who protect both innocent lives and the world from demons and other dark forces.

The reboot changes several elements from the original Charmed series, including moving the fictional setting from San Francisco to Hilltowne; making the middle sister a lesbian; giving the youngest sister the power of empathy instead of premonition; changing the family name from Halliwell to Vera; and having all three of the sisters' alliterative names begin with 'M' instead of 'P'. Additionally, the reboot has a more ethnically diverse cast: Mantock is Afro-Caribbean, Diaz is Puerto Rican, and Jeffery is African American, English and Indigenous Canadian. In the show, the sisters are of mixed ethnic background, having Latina, African-American and white heritage.

It was originally thought that Macy was the half-sister, until the tenth episode of the first season revealed that Macy and Maggie are full sisters, sharing the same father, and Mel is the real half-sister, sharing the same mother as Macy and Maggie but a different father (Ray Vera).

In a parallel to the original series, Macy dies at the end of the third season while fighting off evil, and in the fourth season, a new Charmed One, Kaela Danso, is introduced in her place.

== Cast and characters ==
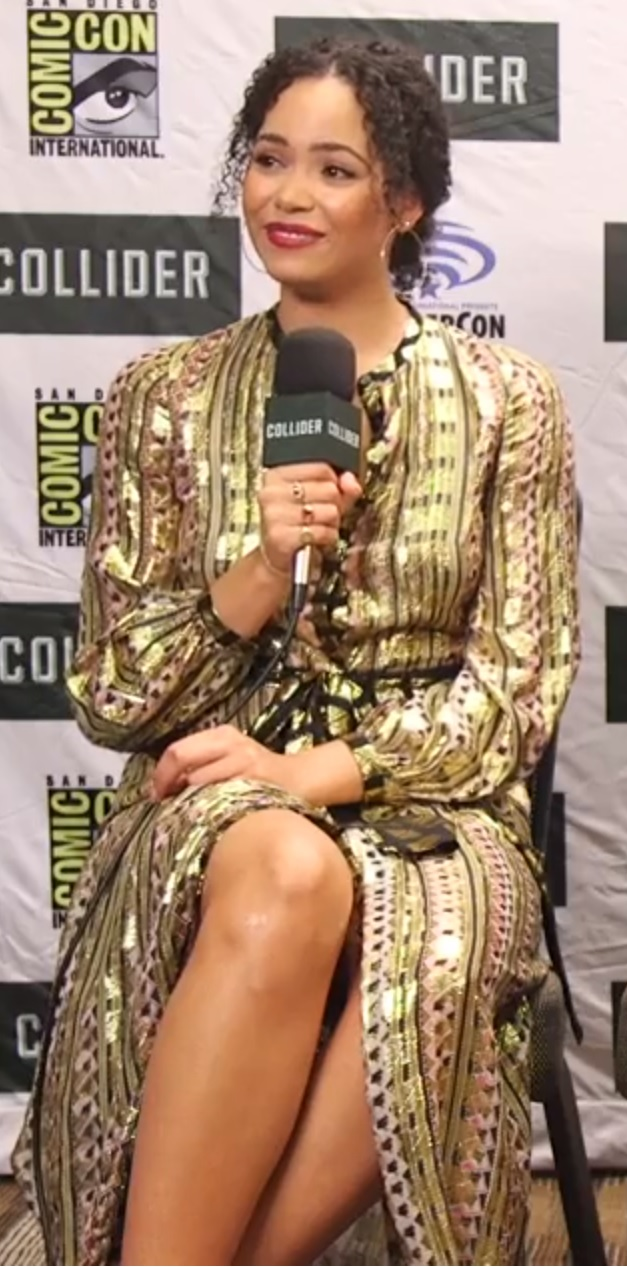
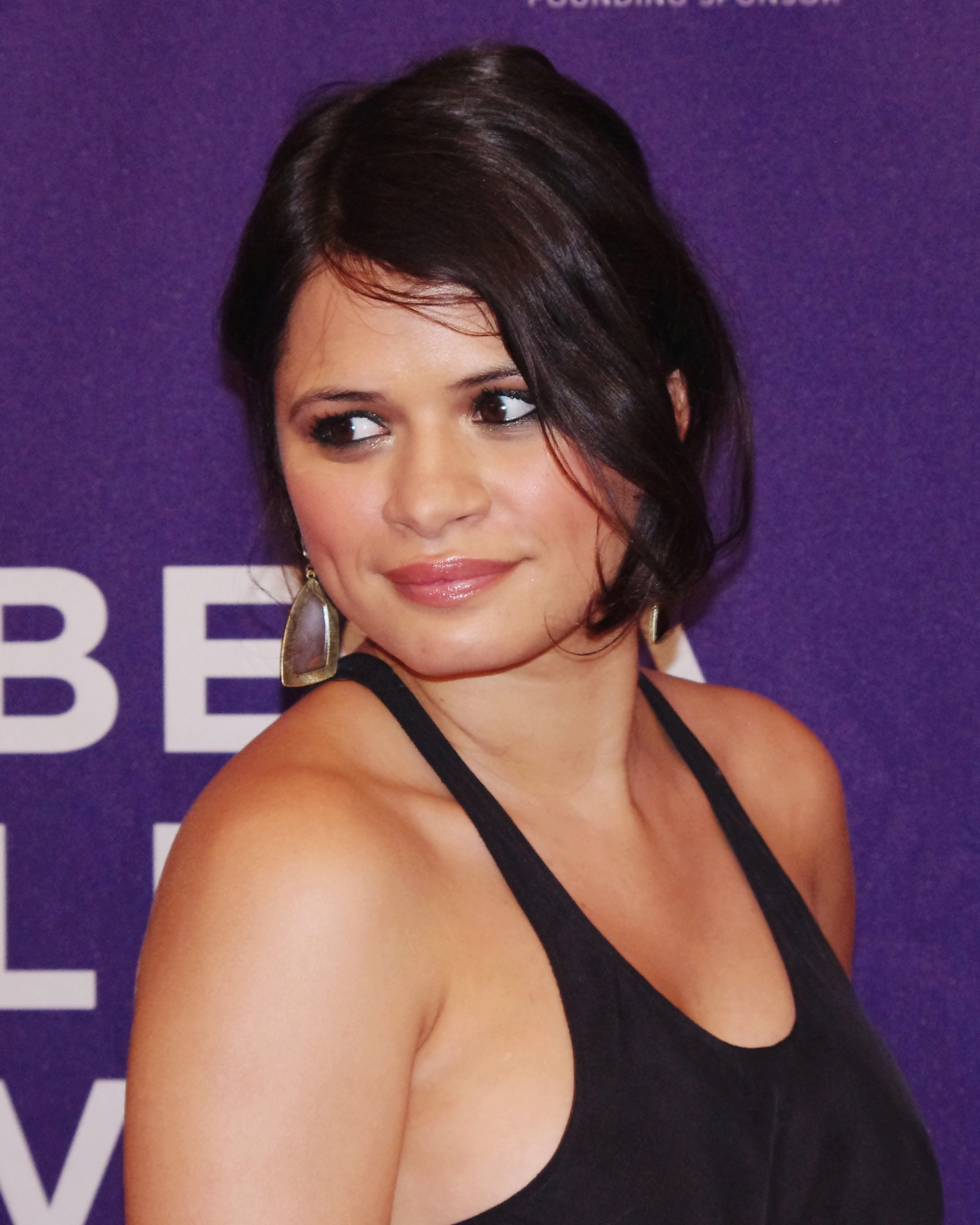
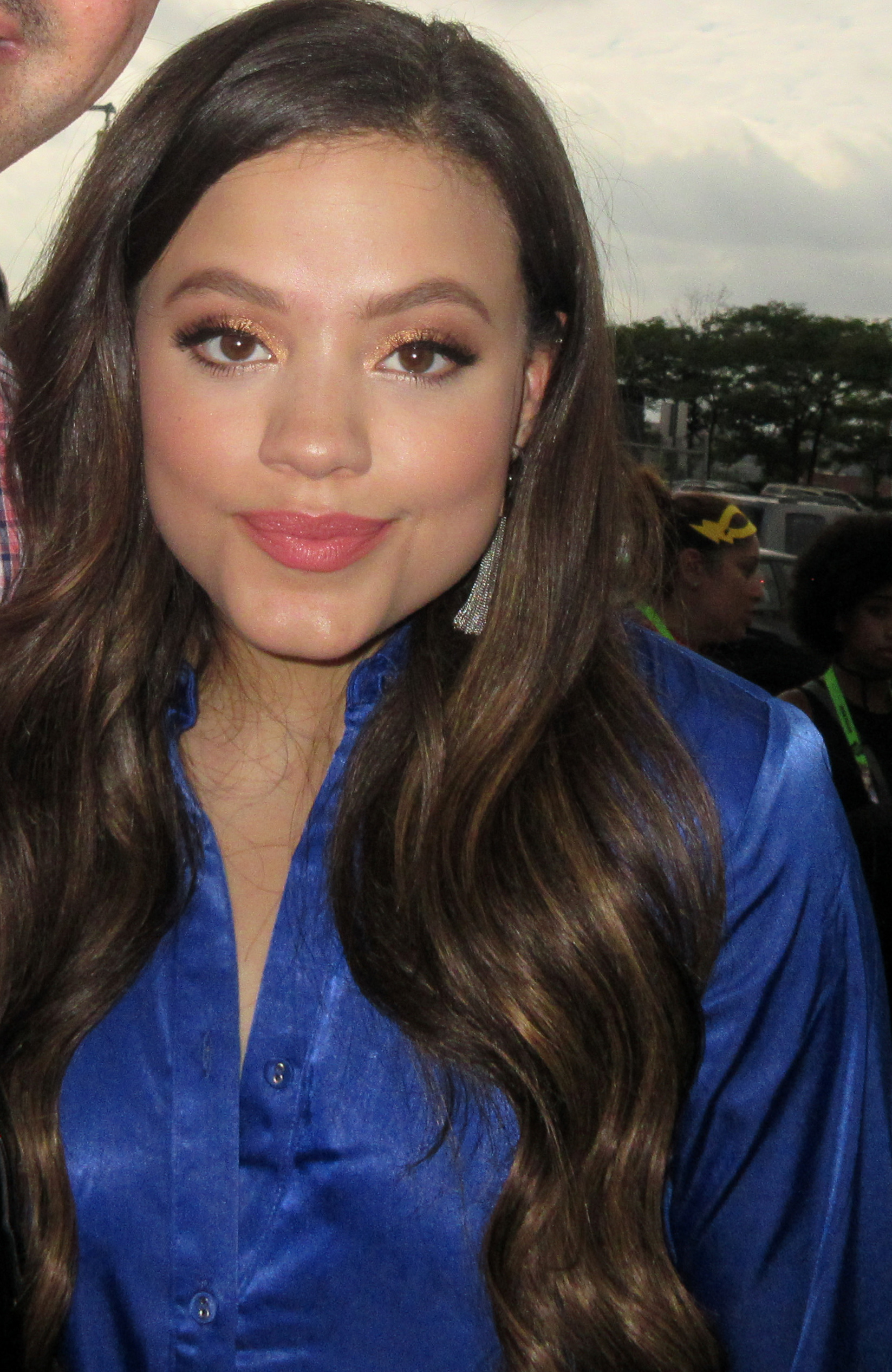
From left to right: Madeleine Mantock (Macy Vaughn), Melonie Diaz (Mel Vera), and Sarah Jeffery (Maggie Vera)

=== Main ===
- Melonie Diaz as Mel Vera, the middle half-sister in the family. A "strong-willed feminist" and "passionate, outspoken activist," Mel is a graduate student in the women's studies department at Hilltowne University. She is a lesbian who was previously in a relationship with Niko (Ellen Tamaki) and Jada Shields (Aleyse Shannon). A "time witch," Mel was born with the power of time-freezing, similar to the original middle sister Piper Halliwell (Holly Marie Combs) from the original series, and later develops the power to send people and objects through time. She also develops molecular manipulation, even more similar to Piper's powers, which allows her to slow or accelerate molecules to make ice, or to heat up and explode objects.
- Madeleine Mantock as Macy Vaughn (seasons 1–3), the eldest sister. She is a "practical", "driven", "shy" and "intense science nerd". Macy has a PhD in molecular genetics and initially moved to Hilltowne, Michigan, to work in the university lab. Once she arrives in town, Macy discovers that she has a younger half-sister and a younger sister. Macy has the power of telekinesis, similar to the original eldest sister Prue Halliwell (Shannen Doherty) of the original Charmed series. Macy was stillborn as a baby but was brought back to life by necromancy, which caused her to have a demon side. She is later stripped of her demon aspect in the second season. She and her Whitelighter Harry become a couple at the end of the second season. In the third-season finale, she dies in a similar fashion to her counterpart Prue.
- Sarah Jeffery as Maggie Vera, the youngest sister. She is a "bubbly", "fun-loving" and "kindhearted" freshman at Hilltowne University who is pledging a sorority. Maggie is initially mortified to learn that she is a witch as she wants to be well-liked and fit in. Maggie has the power of empathy, the ability to read the emotions of other people, which expanded to being able to hear thoughts too. This is one of the first differences from the original show as the original youngest sister Phoebe Halliwell (Alyssa Milano) from the original series initially had the power of premonition, before developing empathy in the later seasons. Later, Maggie develops similar powers to Phoebe in the original Charmed, including the power of foresight, the ability to transfer her emotional state to others, and eventually the ability to empathically mimic the powers of people she touches.
- Ser'Darius Blain as Galvin Burdette (season 1), a molecular geneticist who works at the Hilltowne University lab with Macy Vaughn. He is "outgoing" and "generous", and is the first person who befriends Macy when she moves to Hilltowne. He enters into a relationship with Macy but ultimately sacrifices himself at the end of the first season to stop the Harbinger virus.
- Ellen Tamaki as Niko Hamada (season 1), a "smart" and "determined" detective with the Hilltowne police department. She dates Mel Vera until Mel uses a spell to reverse time so that they never met in order to protect her. Niko returned to Hilltowne as a private investigator and encountered Mel. It is revealed that Niko had a mental breakdown which led to her changing careers, she is engaged to marry Greta, the woman she was with before she met Mel in the original timeline, but her interactions with Mel cause trouble between them much like the original timeline, especially after she learns about Mel's status as a witch and their past relationship. By the end of the first season, Mel decides to let Niko go and move on.
- Rupert Evans as Harry Greenwood, the sisters' Whitelighter – a guardian angel who protects and guides witches. In the first episode, Harry initially poses as a professor and the chair of the women's studies department at Hilltowne University until he gathers all three sisters together to reunite them and inform them of their destiny as the Charmed Ones. He does not remember his life as a human. By the end of the first season, he is shown to have developed feelings for Macy. At the end of the second season, he and Macy become a couple. Evans also portrays Harry's Darklighter in the second season.
- Nick Hargrove as Parker Caine (season 1; (Note: Hargrove is credited as part of the main cast from the seventh episode of the first season to the 22nd.) recurring season 2), Maggie Vera's boyfriend. He is the president of the Phi Delta Upsilon fraternity. He and Maggie become friends after he defends her from a rude customer at her waitressing job. He is later revealed to be a half-demon sent by his father to wreak havoc on the sisters. He betrays his father as he falls in love with Maggie but is forced to leave at the end of the first season to deal with his demon side. He later returns during the second season, where it's revealed that he has taken over demonkind as its new Overlord. After his sister usurps his position as the Overlord, he willingly allows Abigael to strip him of his demon side, which renders him mortal.
- Jordan Donica as Jordan Chase (seasons 2–4), a law student and amateur boxer. It is later revealed that his family was cursed by a witch due to his ancestor having spearheaded the witch's execution, with the result that the men in his family do not live past the age of 25. He breaks the curse for himself but wants to find a way to break it permanently for the sake of his descendants.
- Poppy Drayton as Abigael Jameson-Caine (seasons 2–3), (Note: Drayton is credited as part of the main cast from the third episode of the second season onwards.) a demon-witch rescued and recruited by Macy. She is later revealed to be a member of the Caine family, being Alistair's daughter and Hunter's and Parker's half-sister, and has a secret agenda to take over demonkind as its Overlord by stealing the position from Parker.
- Lucy Barrett as Kaela Danso (season 4), an artist and mechanic from Philadelphia with the magical power of imagination manifestation. After Macy's death in the third season, Kaela is revealed to be the new Charmed One who helps reconstitute the Power of Three, although her ties to Maggie and Mel are left ambiguous at the time of her introduction. It is later revealed that she is linked to the sisters due to having received a stem cell donation from Macy while battling cancer, which also resulted in her powers manifesting.

=== Recurring ===
- Valerie Cruz as Marisol Vera, Macy, Mel, and Maggie's mother. She was an elder and had the power of prophecy. Due to a necromancer's curse, she had to give up Macy when the latter turned two. She was murdered by her friend and fellow elder Charity Callahan.
- Natalie Hall as Lucy (season 1), the superficial, pretentious, and "woke" president of Kappa Tau Kappa, the sorority that Maggie is interested in joining. Lucy initially seems like an airhead but gradually reveals hidden layers and becomes a good friend of Maggie's.
- Constantine Rousoli as Hunter Caine (season 1), Parker's older, full demon brother. Hunter is a shapeshifter who is tasked with killing powerful witches in order to steal their DNA. It is later revealed that he is doing so in order to try to eliminate his younger brother's human side.
- Craig Parker as Alistair Caine (season 1), the benefactor of Hilltowne's Department of Genetics. Alistair Caine is Parker, Hunter, and Abigael's father. He is a really powerful demon trying to turn his youngest son, Parker, into the Source. He is ultimately vanquished by Macy after she becomes the Source.
- Virginia Williams as Charity Callahan (season 1), an elder and friend of the late Marisol Vera. She had a romantic relationship with Harry Greenwood in the past. She murdered Marisol out of fear that her daughter, Macy, would succumb to evil due to the circumstances of her resurrection. She also killed other elders who learned of her evil acts. She was later killed by her younger sister Fiona.
- Leah Pipes as Fiona Callahan (season 1), a witch, Charity's younger sister, and a former charge of Harry Greenwood's. She is known as the Keeper of the Sacred Flame, a primordial source of power that is actually the source of all of magic itself. She was imprisoned in Tartarus by the elders as they felt intimidated because she had befriended the Sarcana. The Sarcana later freed her but she killed them after regaining her strength. She planned to raise the Source in order to kill the host and destroy all magic.
- Bethany Brown as Ruby Malone (seasons 2–4), a retired witch and a bartender at SafeSpace Seattle who dates Mel. When Ruby turned 18, she was given the choice to "retire" being a witch as well, and she ultimately chose to. While she no longer had her active powers, she retained her basic abilities of spell casting and potion making. She breaks up with Mel between the third and fourth seasons.
- Christin Park as Swan (seasons 2–4), the assistant manager at SafeSpace Seattle.
- Shiva Kalaiselvan as Katrina (season 2), the owner of Spellbound Botanica and a practitioner of witchcraft
- Eric Balfour as Julian Shea (seasons 2–3), a tech millionaire with an interest in SafeSpace Seattle
- Peyton List as Nadia (seasons 2–3)
- Kate Burton as Celeste (seasons 2–3), a former elder and the person responsible for creating Whitelighters and Darklighters.
- Jason Diaz as Antonio (season 3), Maggie's classmate and "nemesis"
- J. J. Hawkins as Kevin (season 3), a transgender male college student in one of the courses that Mel teaches
- Mareya Salazar as Joséfina Reyes (season 3–4), a second cousin of the Charmed Ones who is a trans woman
- Aryeh-Or and Heather Doerksen as Mo and Aladria respectively (season 3), two ancient beings known as the Perfecti and the guardians of the Tomb of Chaos
- Kapil Talwalkar as Dev (season 4)
- Shi Ne Nielson as Roxie (season 4)

== Episodes ==
Season	Episodes	Originally released		Rank	Average viewers (in millions)
Season	Episodes	First released	Last released	Rank	Average viewers (in millions)
1	22	October 14, 2018	May 19, 2019	139	0.85
2	19	October 11, 2019	May 1, 2020	129	0.63
3	18	January 24, 2021	July 23, 2021	152	0.38
4	13	March 11, 2022	June 10, 2022	135	0.35

== Production ==
=== Background and development ===
A reboot of the original Charmed series had been announced since October 2013, when it was originally being developed for CBS by Party of Five co-creator Christopher Keyser and Sydney Sidner. The CBS reboot's pilot script was going to revolve "around four sisters who discover their destiny – to battle against the forces of evil using their witchcraft." However, CBS ultimately decided not to move forward with the reboot. On January 5, 2017, it was announced that the CW was developing a new reboot of Charmed by Jane the Virgin showrunner Jennie Snyder Urman for the 2017–18 television season. Urman had been approached in 2016 by CBS Television Studios (who own the rights to Charmed) to work on a new reboot of the show. Urman, knowing that Jane the Virgin writers Jessica O'Toole and Amy Rardin were fans of the original series, brought them on board with her along with director Brad Silberling. On why she wanted to reboot the series, Urman explained: "The original was so much about female empowerment and sisterhood and strong women taking over the world and I feel like that's what we need right now. It felt like a good time to get back to that and show women kicking ass." On the reason they chose not to revive the series with the original cast, O'Toole explained: "That show wrapped everything up so wonderfully — they all got their happy endings, and there were even glimpses of their future. We felt like it told a complete story." Urman added that they did not want to mess around with the original because it was eight years of mythology. The CW president Mark Pedowitz weighed in on why Charmed was better as a reboot than a revival, saying "We wanted to take a different path" with Urman's "great" perspective, calling the original series "a great show for that time and place" only.

The CW reboot's original pilot script was going to be a prequel set in 1976 about three witches (Tina, Paige and Annie), who are not related but are brought together to fight evil in a small New England town. O'Toole stated that the prequel would have "explicitly explore[d] the links between the feminist movement and witchcraft." At the time, Pedowitz described the reboot as "a self-contained, self-sustained" and "very standalone show" that would not have any ties to the original series. However, on February 3, 2017, The Hollywood Reporter announced that the reboot would be redeveloped and delayed until the 2018–19 television season, as the pilot draft script "didn't come in the way the network had hoped" and that Urman, who had prior commitments with Jane the Virgin, did not have enough time to fully commit to the reboot for the 2017–18 season. Pedowitz gave an update on the reboot during the Television Critics Association press tour in August 2017, saying that it was still in the redevelopment process and that the network was waiting to see what Urman had come up with for the redeveloped script.

On January 25, 2018, the CW officially ordered the Charmed reboot to pilot. The redeveloped script was changed to be set in the present day and was described by the CW as "a fierce, funny, feminist reboot" centered on "three sisters in a college town who, after the tragic death of their mother, are stunned to discover they are witches." The description also stated that the reboot would revolve around the sisters "vanquishing supernatural demons" and "tearing down the patriarchy," while "maintaining familial bonds." O'Toole told BuzzFeed News that the reason the redeveloped script was changed to the present day was because of the results of the 2016 United States presidential election. She explained, "Suddenly it didn't feel like it should be a period piece anymore. All of the themes seemed more relevant, and we wanted to reconceptualize some things, and it felt like it really should be set in a contemporary world." The pilot episode was written by O'Toole and Rardin, and was based on a story by Urman. All three women became executive producers for the first season alongside Silberling, Ben Silverman, Howard T. Owens, and Carter Covington. The pilot episode was also directed by Silberling. After the pilot was filmed, Silberling told the Metro newspaper that the appeal of the reboot is to be "fun and contemporary" with its timely social observations. On May 11, the CW picked up the pilot and ordered the Charmed reboot to series with 13 episodes. On October 8, the CW ordered five additional scripts for the first season, and a month later, the CW ordered an additional nine episodes, bringing the first season total up to 22 episodes. On January 31, 2019, the CW gave the series an early renewal for a second season. According to Lesley Goldberg of The Hollywood Reporter, Charmed was renewed due to strong international sales.

Showrunners throughout the series' run
Season	Showrunners
1	Carter Covington
2–3	Liz Kruger and Craig Shapiro
4	Jeffrey Lieber, Joey Falco, and Nicki Renna

On March 25, 2019, it was announced that showrunner Carter Covington would be departing Charmed after the first season, with married duo Liz Kruger and Craig Shapiro taking over as showrunners for the second season. Covington was originally brought in as showrunner after Charmed was picked up to series, in order to help executive producers Jessica O'Toole and Amy Rardin, neither of whom had run a show before. Following the change in showrunners, media outlets reported that the second season would lean harder into the supernatural storylines, with less focus on the family dynamics that Covington helped make. However, ahead of the second-season premiere, Kruger stated in an interview with TV Insider that the core of the show and "the heart of the story is still about the power of sisterhood and how powerful women can change the world." Shapiro also told TV Insider that they changed the whole tone and visual look of the show to become more "darker, moodier, edgier" and "more cinematic" than the first season. Both Jeffrey Lieber and director Stuart Gillard also joined the second season as additional executive producers. On January 7, 2020, the series was given another early renewal for a third season.

The CW renewed Charmed for a fourth season on February 3, 2021. On August 27, 2021, TVLine reported that Lieber, Joey Falco, and Nicki Renna would take over as showrunners for the fourth season, while Kruger and Shapiro would remain on the show as executive producers. Falco told TVLine that he and Renna "had a lot of time to think about things we want to see more of on the show", and described the fourth season as "the most fun, sexy, exciting season of Charmed yet". Renna commented that they are looking forward to taking "the show to places we've been wanting to, with storylines and emotional arcs that really excite us" and further added that the fourth season would focus more on stories about the sisters. With the then-pending sale of the CW to Nexstar Media Group and its emphasis on sports and acquired programming, on May 12, 2022, the CW announced that the fourth season would be its final season.

=== Casting ===
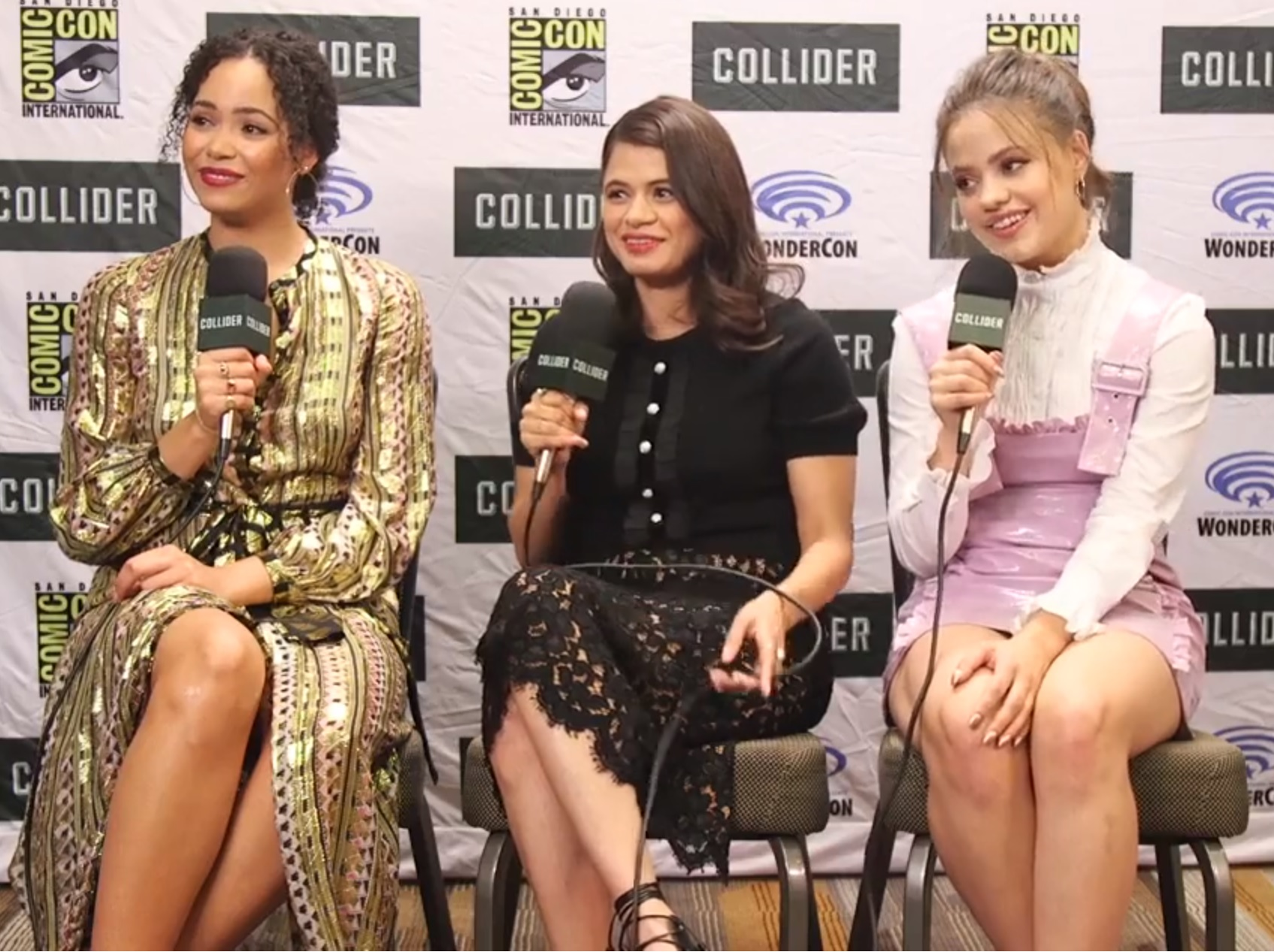
Left to right: Madeleine Mantock, Melonie Diaz, and Sarah Jeffery at San Diego Comic-Con in 2018

Casting details for Charmed were first revealed by TVLine on February 7, 2018, with the three sisters bearing the unofficial names of Macy, Mel and Madison Pruitt. It also revealed that all ethnicities were being considered for each of the roles and that one of the sisters would be a lesbian, a major change from the original Charmed series where all Halliwell sisters were straight women. TVLine also revealed that casting was underway for the trio's "devilishly handsome" advisor/whitelighter Harry, Macy's "documentary filmmaker-boyfriend" Galvin, Madison's "sensitive loner ex-beau" Brian, and Mel's detective girlfriend Soo Jin. During production, Madison's name was later changed to Maggie, the sisters' family name was changed from Pruitt to Vera, Soo Jin's name was changed to Niko, and Galvin was rewritten as a scientist. Former Into the Badlands British actress Madeleine Mantock was cast as the eldest sister Macy, "a practical, driven, and brilliant geneticist". Mantock was cast after Jane the Virgin writer Micah Schraft, who she had worked with on another show five years prior, recommended her to the Charmed producers. Mantock did a Skype interview with the producers because she was in London at the time. In an interview with Teen Vogue, Mantock revealed that she wanted to be part of the show after reading "how funny and smart and conscious" the pilot script was, saying "I thought it was a wonderful way to broach important subjects, be they women's issues or political issues, in a way that's also tied into this wonderful magical fantasy that everybody loves."

Film actress Melonie Diaz was cast as the middle sister Mel, "a passionate, outspoken activist" and lesbian. Diaz, who was the first sister cast in Charmed, was chosen after a successful meeting with the producers, which she felt was "an instantaneous connection". Diaz was impressed with their vision for Charmed, saying "I thought it was a really clever, unique way to kind of modernize this big show." Canadian actress Sarah Jeffery was cast as the youngest sister Maggie, "a bubbly college freshman" and sorority pledge. Jeffery revealed that the producers were at first wary of her auditioning for the show because she was still attached to Shades of Blue. She auditioned for the show with scenes involving a demon dog and a fight with one of Maggie's sisters. Jeffery was eventually released from Shades of Blue so she could do Charmed. Mantock, Diaz and Jeffery did not do any screen tests together, but the latter two described the trio's instant chemistry as "miraculous". Diaz stated, "We really feel like sisters," while Jeffery added, "We were lucky – it was an immediate connection. We have a sisterly rapport and it's reflected onscreen."

The lead actresses are of different ethnic backgrounds: Mantock is Afro-Caribbean, Diaz is Puerto Rican, and Jeffery is African American, English and Indigenous Canadian. The shows creators have stated that the sisters are of mixed ethnic backgrounds, having Latina, African-American and white heritage. Executive producer Jessica O'Toole told BuzzFeed News, "It was always written that way, specifically to have characters who were of color, and with the casting it all kind of came together." O'Toole also added that the decision to make the lead actresses non-white was one of the reasons the producers decided the show would not be based on the Halliwell sisters' children from the original Charmed series, who were all white. Executive producer Jennie Snyder Urman explained that "we've had a chance to see three white witches" and working on Jane the Virgin, which had a predominantly Latino cast, helped her realize the importance of representation and "what it's like to see yourself onscreen and see yourself be the hero of the story".

Former Man in the High Castle British actor Rupert Evans was cast as Harry, a college professor and the sisters' Whitelighter. Ser'Darius Blain was cast as Galvin, a love interest of Macy's. Blain departed the show at the end of the first season after his character was killed off. Charlie Gillespie was cast as Brian, a love interest of Maggie's who only appeared in the first two episodes of the series. Ellen Tamaki was cast in the first season as Niko, "a detective on the Hilltowne police force" and lesbian who is a love interest of Mel's. Tamaki did not return for the second season. Nick Hargrove was also cast in the first season as Parker, a fraternity president and new love interest of Maggie's. He was initially cast as recurring and was later promoted to the main cast. Hargrove did not return as a regular in the second season but did make several guest appearances during it. Jordan Donica was cast in the second season as Jordan, a mysterious law student and amateur boxer. Former Shannara Chronicles British actress Poppy Drayton also joined the second season as Abigael Caine, a powerful half-witch and half-demon. Both Donica and Drayton returned as regulars for the third season.

In July 2021, it was announced that Mantock had departed Charmed, which resulted in her character Macy's death in the third-season finale. Mantock spoke of her departure in a statement to TVLine, saying: "Playing Macy on Charmed for the last three seasons has been an immense privilege and I have so enjoyed working with our fantastic producers, creatives, cast and crew. I'm incredibly grateful to the CW and CBS Studios for my time on the show and for being a brilliant support in my difficult decision to leave." Showrunners Liz Kruger and Craig Shapiro also told TVLine that they respect Mantock's decision to move on and that the door would always be "open for a return visit from Macy . . . one way or another!" On September 8, 2021, Australian actress Lucy Barrett was announced as Mantock's replacement as a new Charmed One for the upcoming fourth season. However, details about her character are being kept under wraps, including her name, backstory, powers, and connection to the show's remaining lead characters, Mel and Maggie. Showrunners Jeffrey Lieber, Joey Falco and Nicki Renna described Barrett's character as "an artist" who is "fun, irreverent, impulsive, strong-willed, and will bring a brand-new energy to the Power of Three".

=== Filming ===
Charmed is filmed in Vancouver, British Columbia, where several other CW shows are filmed. Interior scenes for the show are filmed at the Whites Ironwood Studios in Vancouver. The historical J. E. Phillips House, located at 323 Queens Avenue in New Westminster, is used as the exterior for the show's fictional Vera Manor. It pays homage to the original Charmed's Halliwell Manor, in that it is a similar-looking red Victorian house. The exterior scenes used for Hilltowne University during the first season were filmed at the University of British Columbia's Point Grey Campus. The pilot episode was filmed from March 19 to April 7, 2018. After the pilot was picked up and Charmed was ordered to series, filming for the remainder of the first season resumed on August 13, 2018, and ended on April 26, 2019.

The second season began filming on July 24, 2019, and was expected to end on April 16, 2020. However, production was shut down early on March 12, 2020, due to the COVID-19 pandemic, with only 19 of the ordered 22 episodes completed. The nineteenth episode ended up becoming the second-season finale, with the remaining three episodes filmed as part of the third season when production resumed, as the showrunners wanted to wrap up the storylines as they initially planned. Filming for the third season began on September 30, 2020, under strict COVID-19 protocols and concluded on May 22, 2021. The scenes used as Seattle State College during the third season were filmed at the Emily Carr University of Art and Design. The fourth season began filming on October 14, 2021, and concluded on April 13, 2022.

== Release ==
In the United States, Charmed premiered on the CW on October 14, 2018. The first season aired on Sundays at 9:00 pm, with Supergirl as its lead-in at 8:00 pm. The pairing of Charmed and Supergirl returned the network to original programming on Sunday nights for the first time since the 2008–09 U.S. television season. The CW president Mark Pedowitz explained, "We wanted to have an established show on Sunday night. We wanted name value with Charmed on there. We felt that it was two shows that are empowered women. We were making a statement that we were not kidding, that we're not phoning it in on Sunday night, that we were going to compete." Its second season premiered on October 11, 2019. The show's third-season premiere was delayed until January 24, 2021, due to the COVID-19 pandemic. The fourth season premiered on March 11, 2022.

All complete seasons of Charmed are available to stream on Netflix in the U.S. only, as part of the CW's previous output deal with Netflix. Each season is released in full on Netflix eight days after its season finale has aired on the CW. The complete first season of Charmed was released on Netflix in May 2019. The first season was also released on region 4 DVD in Australia and New Zealand on September 25, 2019, and on region 1 DVD in the U.S. and Canada on October 1, 2019. It was released on region 2 DVD in the United Kingdom on March 16, 2020. The complete second season was released on Netflix in May 2020, and on region 1 DVD on September 29, 2020. The complete third season of Charmed was released on Netflix in July 2021. The DVDs were distributed by Paramount Home Entertainment under the label CBS DVD (identified as CBS Home Entertainment on-screen).

== Reception ==
=== Ratings ===
Viewership and ratings per season of Charmed
Season	Timeslot (ET)	Episodes	First aired		Last aired		TV season	Viewership rank	Avg. viewers (millions)	18–49 rank	Avg. 18–49 rating
Season	Timeslot (ET)	Episodes	Date	Viewers (millions)	Date	Viewers (millions)	TV season	Viewership rank	Avg. viewers (millions)	18–49 rank	Avg. 18–49 rating
1	Sunday 9:00 pm	22	October 14, 2018	1.57	May 19, 2019	0.59	2018–19	139	0.85	139	0.26
2	Friday 8:00 pm	19	October 11, 2019	0.66	May 1, 2020	0.58	2019–20	129	0.63	127	0.17
3	Sunday 9:00 pm (1–11); Friday 8:00 pm (12–18)	18	January 24, 2021	0.46	July 23, 2021	0.42	2020–21	152	0.38	141	0.09
4	Friday 8:00 pm	13	March 11, 2022	0.40	June 10, 2022	0.39	2021–22	TBD	TBD	TBD	TBD

=== Critical response ===
The review aggregator website Rotten Tomatoes reported a 71% approval rating with an average rating of 6.53/10, based on 31 reviews. The website's consensus reads, "Charmed's updates are as fun as they are surprisingly feminist – and with a sharper focus, it could conjure up an even stronger show than the one that came before it". Metacritic, which uses a weighted average, assigned a score of 55 out of 100, based on 13 critics, indicating "mixed or average reviews".

=== Awards and nominations ===
Year	Award	Category	Nominee(s)	Result	Ref.
2019	Leo Awards	Best Stunt Coordination – Dramatic Series	Rick Pearce (for "Other Women")	Nominated	
2019	Saturn Awards	Best Fantasy Television Series	Charmed	Nominated	
2019	Teen Choice Awards	Choice Sci-Fi/Fantasy TV Actress	Melonie Diaz	Nominated	
2019	Teen Choice Awards	Choice Sci-Fi/Fantasy TV Show	Charmed	Nominated	
2020	The Joey Awards	Best Featured Actress in a TV Series (5–7 Years Old)	Isla Sunar	Won	
2020	Leo Awards	Best Production Design – Dramatic Series	Matthew Budgeon (for "Safe Space")	Won	
2021	Young Artist Awards	Best TV Series Guest Artist	Isla Sunar	Won	

=== Controversies ===
==== Original cast, crew and fan reactions ====
Shortly after the pilot's announcement in January 2018, Holly Marie Combs, a cast member from the original Charmed series, took to Twitter and criticized the CW's decision to reboot the show without any input from the original cast or crew. Combs claimed to have an issue with the CW's "reimagining" of Charmed as the network, formerly known as The WB, chose not to renew the show in 2006 for a ninth season. Combs accused the CW of trying to cash in on the Charmed name and concept, while "capitalizing" on the original cast and crew's hard work. Combs also took issue with the network's description of a "feminist" reboot, which she felt implied the original series was not, by sarcastically tweeting: "Guess we forgot to do that the first go around. Hmph." Combs then implied that the reboot should have a new title, as she felt that it is a brand new show with no ties to the original Charmed. She tweeted that television reboots or remakes "usually have storylines so similar to the original that they are legally required to use the same title and buy the rights to that title", further adding, "If it's not similar then it's just another show. A new show with a new title." Another original cast member, Alyssa Milano, told Entertainment Tonight that she wished the original cast were involved with the reboot from the beginning of its development at the CW, further adding "I do hope that it reaches the newer generation and impacts that generation the way ours was able to do for its generation."

Shannen Doherty was more positive about the reboot to fans on Twitter, stating that it was a testament to the original that a reboot was even being considered. She also added that she was "intrigued by the idea that a new generation might be comforted, inspired like you all were. Charmed helped us all in some way." However, Doherty admitted that she did take issue with the CW's description of a "feminist" reboot, by tweeting that their wording was "terrible and a bit offensive," but understood that "everyone makes mistakes". Doherty further voiced her support for the reboot in an interview with Entertainment Tonight, stating "I think it's great. I think it's awesome...I'm happy to see that a show, that back then was all about strong women who supported and loved each other, is now coming back again in this day and age." Doherty appreciated the reboot for providing a lot of job opportunities for people, wished the cast and crew well, and hoped that fans of the original series would give the reboot a chance. Rose McGowan was also positive towards the reboot and showed her support to the new lead actresses by tweeting "fly girls, fly." McGowan also added that she had no issues with the reboot and wished "everyone the best". McGowan further voiced her support for the reboot on Instagram, posting "I wish nothing but the best for the new female actors whose careers hopefully will be launched by this show into something long and prosperous."

News of the reboot was met with a mixed response from fans of the original series. Some fans were positive about the reboot, while others were not impressed about the changes made to the series. Following the reboot announcement, fans took to Twitter and began to share the #StopCharmedReboot hashtag in attempts to prevent the CW from moving forward with the pilot. The CW's president Mark Pedowitz stated that he would like the fans to give the reboot a chance, telling fans that "before you make a decision, watch the series". In an interview with HuffPost in May 2018, Combs spoke up about the reboot again, this time criticizing the show's marketing and the casting of younger actors. She stated that although she appreciates "the jobs and opportunities the Charmed reboot has created", she "will never understand what is fierce, funny, or feminist in creating a show that basically says the original actresses are too old to do a job they did 12 years ago". Milano also spoke up about the reboot again to Us Weekly in May 2019, stating that she felt the show "ruined any possibility" of a reunion between the four original lead actresses, calling it "disrespectful" and "sad" that they were not involved from the beginning. Milano believed that they "would have come [together] to do something" as they "created that world" first.

In the series finale, the main characters end up in another dimension in front of Halliwell Manor, where the original series took place. Curtis Kheel, who was a writer on the original Charmed series, tweeted his version of what would have happened the following season: "As an original Charmed writer, I can tell [you] what happened next: Piper, Phoebe and Paige vanquished the [three] impostors right after they invaded Halliwell Manor. Then [Combs] blew up the portal to that other universe [and] quipped: 'We wish them well.'" In reference to this tweet, the writers from the 2018 series replied, "Unlike with the OG version of the franchise, we had a strict 'no assholes' hiring policy in the writers' room. We feel mostly sorry for these people, because unlike them we actually like each other and had the best time." However, Kheel responded to this with, "My problem with the Charmed reboot is that from Day One, it pretended like the original Charmed didn't exist, yet it borrowed a ton of ideas from it. We worked very hard on the OG series for many years [and] to disregard that is offensive and disrespectful to us and our fans."

==== Accusations of colorism ====
While the series was praised for its diversity by casting three women of color in the lead roles, it also received backlash from some television critics for being promoted as a Latina-led series when only one of the lead actresses is Latina. Madeleine Mantock, who learned Spanish for the role, said, "[I'm] open to the writers and trying to be respectful, because I'm Afro-Caribbean. I'm not actually Afro-Latina and I do want to make that distinction because Melonie [Diaz] is actually the only person who is in her real life is Latina." Sarah Jeffery explained, "Yeah, I know that we are representing the Latina community. I actually am African-American. I'm not Latina, which is a common misconception." Latina writer Samantha Chavarria of the website We Are Mitu felt that this news does "highlight the very real fact that in their effort to promote a reboot, the CW used colorism and exploitation to spark our excitement and interest." Chavarria further criticized the network for not correcting the misinformation about the cast's ethnicities, calling it an "ultimate stab to the wound" and "just plain shady". Another Latino writer, Patrick Gomez of Entertainment Weekly, was more forgiving of the casting because the actresses were honest and that a search into their ethnicities would have been inappropriate, adding, "[...] I hope people celebrate the fact that an African-American and an Afro-Caribbean woman are being cast as 'Latinas' because Afro-Latinx people are not given even a fraction of the visibility they should have in on-camera representations of Latinx people". Princess Weekes of The Mary Sue felt that the actresses were not to blame, but also criticized the CW's use of colorism for "the idea that because they are lighter-skinned women with long hair, they can 'pass' for Latina when they are actually black women."
