= Our Lips Are Sealed (film) =

- UK DVD cover
- Directed by: Craig Shapiro
- Written by: Elizabeth Kruger; Craig Shapiro
- Produced by: Neil Steinberg; Natan Zahavi
- Starring: Mary-Kate and Ashley Olsen
- Cinematography: David Lewis
- Edited by: Sherwood Jones
- Music by: Christopher Brady
- Production companies: Dualstar Entertainment Group; Tapestry Films; Courage Films Pty Ltd
- Distributed by: Warner Home Video
- Release date: November 21, 2000
- Running time: 90 minutes
- Countries: United States; Australia
- Language: English

Our Lips Are Sealed is a 2000 crime comedy film starring Mary-Kate and Ashley Olsen. The film was partly set and filmed in Sydney, Australia. The film was produced by Dualstar Entertainment Group, Tapestry Films and Courage Films Pty Ltd and released by Warner Home Video on November 21, 2000.

== Plot ==
The Parkers, twin sisters, are placed in the FBI's Witness Protection Program after they witness a robbery at the local museum, in which the priceless Kneel Diamond is stolen. Unfortunately, the sisters have a problem with being blabbermouths; as a result, everywhere the Parkers are sent to live, the girls inadvertently end up revealing their witness status. The gang is led by a crime lord, Hatchew, who will do anything to get his hands on the diamond, which the thieves slipped into one of the girls' shoulder bag during their escape from the crime scene. The gem ultimately ends up being set into one of the girls' necklace.

The family travels everywhere in the United States, from Texas to a prairie town, and eventually have been moved to every geographic location around the world possible, with the single exception of Australia. Thus, the FBI send them to live in Sydney, where they are given the aliases Maddie and Abby Turtleby. The girls have much trouble at first, especially with fitting in with their peers. Two assassins named Mac and Sidney are sent after them after discovering their location by breaking into the FBI office. The twins defeat Mac and Sidney by knocking them out, tying them to surfboards, putting clips in Sidney's hair, painting Mac's toenails, and threatening to put pink and blue bikinis on them. After the twins manage to convince them to change sides, they leave after the girls lure Hatchew to Australia. He comes after them, manages to get the diamond, and sets his thug on them. It looks like they are about to die, until Mac and Sidney return and defeat the thug, saving the girls. Hatchew nearly gets away on a seaplane, but the twins stop him by using a boomerang, and he is arrested by Katie, an undercover FBI agent posing as a lifeguard. The Parkers are finally able to return home to the United States with half the reward money for capturing the thieves.

== Cast ==
- Ashley Olsen as Abby Parker/"Abby Turtleby"
- Mary-Kate Olsen as Maddie Parker/"Maddie Turtleby"
- Jim Meskimen as Rick Parker/"Stanley Turtleby"
- Tamara Clatterbuck as Teri Parker/"Shirley Turtleby"
- Robert Miano as Hatchew
- Jason Clarke as Mac
- Richard Carter as Sidney
- Jo Phillips as Katie
- Harold Hopkins as Shelby Shaw (Oakland resident)
- Ernie Hudson Jr. as Agent Banner
- Willie Garson as Agent Norm
- Jade Bronneberg as Victoria
- Ryan Clark as Pete
- Scott Swalwell as Avery
- Nina Schultz, Prudie Quigley as Sheila
- Chris Foy as Donny
- Daniel Wakefield as Ray
- Pete Callan as news reporter Milo
- Chris Stapley as Leonard
- Katie Fountain as Vanessa
- Randall Rapstine as Principal
- Marguerite MacIntyre as Teacher
- J. P. Manoux as Robber
- Kenneth Davitian as Thug
- Douglas Fisher as Judge
- Garth Holcombe as Jake
- Brett Blewitt as Yacht Steward
- Harry Dajill McKaykanalis, Michael Hodge as Henchmen
- Boomer as himself
