= Dr. Dolittle: Tail to the Chief =

2008 film by Craig Shapiro

- Official DVD cover
- Directed by: Craig Shapiro
- Screenplay by: Matt Lieberman; Kathleen Laccinole
- Story by: Matt Lieberman
- Based on: Doctor Dolittle by Hugh Lofting
- Produced by: John Davis; Brian Manis
- Starring: Kyla Pratt; Karen Holness; Meagan Good; Norm Macdonald
- Narrated by: Keith David
- Cinematography: Ron Stannett
- Edited by: Michael Trent
- Music by: Don Macdonald
- Production company: Davis Entertainment
- Distributed by: 20th Century Fox Home Entertainment
- Release date: March 4, 2008
- Running time: 85 minutes
- Country: United States
- Language: English

Dr. Dolittle: Tail to the Chief (also known as Dr. Dolittle 4) is a 2008 American comedy film directed by Craig Shapiro and starring Kyla Pratt and Norm Macdonald. It is the fourth film in the Dr. Dolittle series. A sequel, Dr. Dolittle: Million Dollar Mutts, was released in 2009.

It was released direct to DVD on March 4, 2008. It is the second film in the series to star Kyla Pratt as Maya Dolittle in the lead role as both Eddie Murphy and Raven-Symoné do not appear. The role of Lisa Dolittle, originally played by Kristen Wilson, returns.

== Plot ==
Maya Dolittle is a girl who can talk to animals. Her older sister Charisse and father Dr. John Dolittle, who is away on animal expeditions, also have this ability. Maya applies to San Francisco College's department of veterinary studies, which contains a center named after her father. John is a celebrity, and people are in awe of his global exploits, ranging from saving whole animal species to helping people in their personal relationship with pets.

Maya is granted a college interview due to her lineage, but the interview doesn't go too well as Maya's grades and SAT scores are not impressive. She does not have any meaningful extra-curricular activities to speak of. She is put in a real-life situation with animal kids, to see how she does, & she fails again to control the situation as the animal kids think of Maya as their mother and go bonkers. Maya is wait listed for admission & is given 4 weeks to impress the committee.

United States President Sterling asks for John's help with the presidential dog Daisy, and to save an African forest. Sterling needs someone who can talk to animals, and it is an urgent matter. Since John is away on travel, Maya decides to take his place. Maya hopes to get a POTUS recommendation to impress the admissions committee at SFC department of vet studies. Maya meets Cole Fletcher, a cute Presidential aide assigned to help Maya that she develops a crush on, Dorian, the Chief of Staff, Courtney, Sterling's daughter who is angry at being denied permission to go on spring break and Selma Dixon, Dorian's assistant.

Sterling explains that Daisy, his dog, is like a member of his family & has played a huge role in his election. Daisy was at his inauguration, and then at all the major events of his presidency. Many people believe Daisy is the symbol of Sterling's presidency, but now Daisy is going crazy, urinating and biting visiting dignitaries. Sterling is in talks with Prince Tharoor of Kalampura to save the second largest rain forest on the planet. Tharoor wants to sell the rain-forest to a US company, who will destroy it. Sterling previously convinced Tharoor to convert the forest into protected land, but at the signing ceremony in Kalampura, Sterling got food poisoning & vomited all over Tharoor. Now the prince is invited to the White House in 8 days to sign the papers and Sterling wants Maya to keep Daisy in check. This is the last attempt to help save the rain forest.

Daisy has a hot temper and is determined not to listen to Maya. Instead, she does the exact opposite of what Maya asks her to do, to make her look bad in front of Sterling. After Daisy destroys the Oval Office, Sterling orders Dorian to shift base to the Sterling ranch. The ranch doubles up as a nature reserve that Sterling established 15 years ago. Daisy takes the help of other animals on the ranch to gang up against Maya and give her a hard time. Under Daisy's command, the animals mount a coordinated attack on Maya during a group therapy session. Selma takes particular pleasure in Maya's failure. Selma says that she intends to influence global geopolitics by the time she is 30 and asks Maya how she intends to help other animals if she cannot control Daisy. After a pep talk from Sterling, Maya decides to make friends with Daisy's friends to corner her. Sterling tells Maya that Michael Jordan did not make his high school basketball team, and Albert Einstein failed his first college entrance exam. Sterling himself lost the election to his high school president and came in 4th and that he wants her to keep trying till she succeeds.

Maya takes Cole's help to rescue Courtney when she sneaks out of the presidential retreat to go to a party with her friends that goes bad. Courtney and Maya bond over the fact that they both have dads that they find difficult to live up to. Maya finally figures out that Daisy is acting up because she misses playing with Sterling.

At a dinner with Tharoor and the princess of the kingdom that the forest is located in, things are going well until they suddenly take a turn for the worse. With the help of animals, Maya finds out Chief Dorian was sabotaging the prince to shut down the forest and make millions. Dorian had given Sterling the bad oysters that led to food poisoning. At the current dinner, Dorian has Daisy's food spiked, so she goes berserk and ends up tripping Tharoor, who is insulted and cancels the deal. Daisy's friends produce a letter from Dorian's safe that proves that he will profit from the rain forest being destroyed. He is arrested and the forest is saved. Sterling writes a recommendation letter for Maya to SFU and she gets into the vet program.

== Cast ==
- Kyla Pratt as Maya Dolittle
- Peter Coyote as President Sterling
- Niall Matter as Cole Fletcher
- Elise Gatien as Courtney Sterling
- Karen Holness as Lisa Dolittle
- Malcolm Stewart as Chief Dorian
- Christopher Gaze as Academic
- Christine Chatelain as Selma Dixon
- Kwesi Ameyaw as Prince Tharoor

=== Voice cast ===
- Norm Macdonald as Lucky the Dog (uncredited)
- Jennifer Coolidge as Daisy, a Cavalier King Charles Spaniel
- Benjamin Diskin as Anteater
- Greg Ellis as Wallaby
- Richard Kind as Groundhog
- Nolan North as Parrot
- Philip Proctor as Drunk Monkey

== Production ==
The film's visual effects were supervised by the former head of Industrial Light & Magic's animation department, Wes Takahashi. The estimated budget for this film is about $6 million.

== Release ==
Dr. Dolittle: Tail to the Chief was released on DVD on March 4, 2008. It placed 15th for copies sold that week and was priced for $26.98.

== Reception ==
=== Critical response ===
Film critic Kevin Carr gave the film a two and a half stars out of 5. Common Sense Media awarded it with three out of five stars. Sloan Freer of Radio Times gave it 2 out of 5 and called it "a sporadically amusing mix of gunge-heavy slapstick, mild adolescent angst and the usual simplistic life lessons".
