= Madeleine Mantock =

British actress (born 1990)

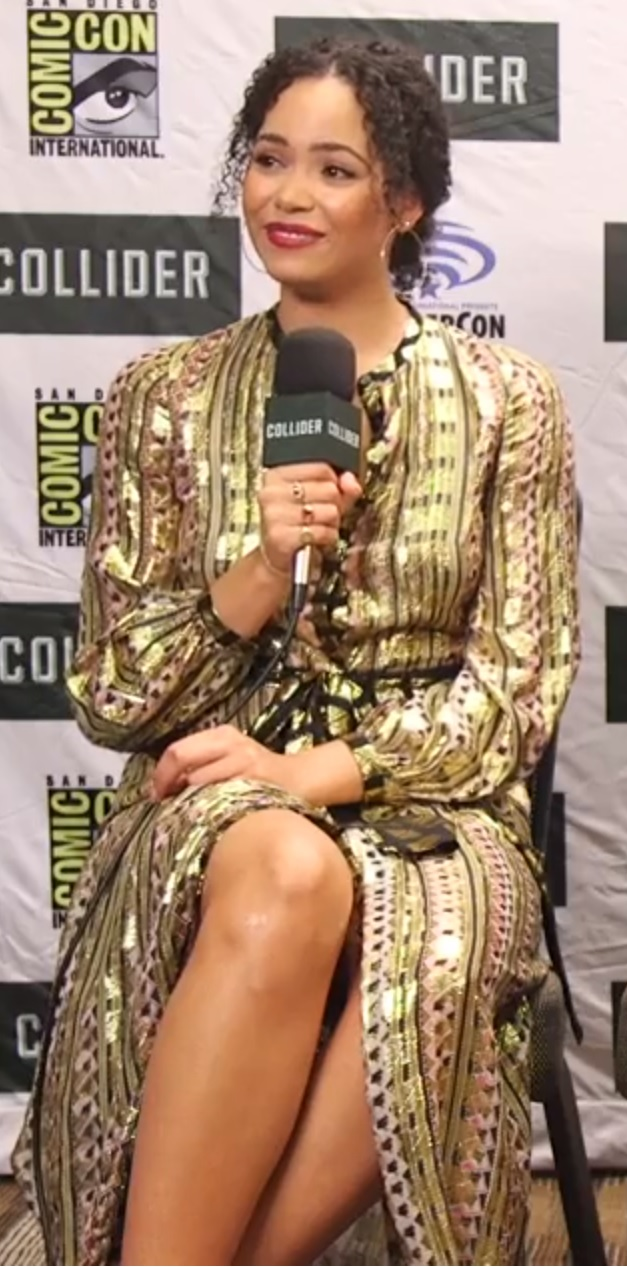
- Mantock at Comic-con in 2018
- Born: 26 May 1990 (age 36); Nottingham, England, UK
- Education: Arts Educational Schools, London (BA)
- Occupation: Actress
- Years active: 2010–present
- Notable credit: Macy Vaughn in Charmed

Madeleine Mantock (born 26 May 1990) is a British actress. She is known for her main role television work on the series Into the Badlands and a remake of the series The Tomorrow People. She played one of the main roles as Macy Vaughn in the reboot of Charmed from 2018 to 2021 on The CW. She appeared in The Long Song as Miss Clara in a supporting role.

== Early life and education ==
Mantock attended Ashfield Comprehensive School from 2001-2006. Mantock is of “Afro-Caribbean and Caucasian” heritage. She attended Arts Educational Schools, London where she obtained her BA in Musical Theatre.

== Career ==
Mantock primarily works in television, starring as main character Scarlett Conway in Casualty, before she graduated drama school. She was part of the series for 36 episodes from 2011 to 2012. She then appeared on Lee Nelson's Well Funny People in 2013, before moving to the United States to be a main character, Astrid, on The Tomorrow People, which was canceled after one season. She then played the small role of Julie in the film Edge of Tomorrow. In 2015 she was cast in a main role, Veil, on AMC's Into the Badlands. Her character for Into the Badlands has received positive response.

Mantock then had a role in the 2017 film Breaking Brooklyn, and filmed her main role in Age Before Beauty.

In March 2018, she was cast in the lead role of Macy Vaughn in The CW's fantasy drama series Charmed, a reboot of the 1998 series of the same name. The reboot centers on three sisters in a college town who discover they are witches. In July 2021, Mantock announced that she would be departing Charmed before the airing of the third season finale.

She also appeared in the supporting role of Miss Clara in the 2018 BBC adaptation of Andrea Levy's novel The Long Song, set in 19th-century colonial Jamaica.

In 2023, Mantock made her Royal Shakespeare Company debut as Agnes/Anne Hathaway in their production of Hamnet (co-produced by Sam Mendes’ Neal Street Productions). Based on the best-selling novel by Maggie O'Farrell, Hamnet is adapted by Lolita Chakrabarti (Life of Pi) and directed by Erica Whyman. After a sold-out run at the RSC, Hamnet transferred to the West End, for a run at the Garrick Theatre from 30 September 2023 to 17 February 2024.

== Filmography ==
Year	Work	Role	Notes
2011–12	Casualty	Scarlett Conway	Regular role
2013	Lee Nelson's Well Funny People	Miss Summers	
2013–14	The Tomorrow People	Astrid Finch	Main role
2014	Edge of Tomorrow	Corporal Julie Montgomery	
2015–17	Into the Badlands	Veil	Main role; seasons 1–2
2016	The Truth Commissioner	Laura	
2017	Breaking Brooklyn	Faith Bryant	
2018	Age Before Beauty	Lorelei	
2018–2021	Charmed	Macy Vaughn	Main role; seasons 1–3
2018	The Long Song	Miss Clara	
2025	The Wayfinders	Sister Brendowyn	
