= Ellen Tamaki =

American actress

- Born: Brooklyn, New York, U.S.
- Education: London Academy of Music and Dramatic Art; Boston University College of Fine Arts
- Occupation: Actress
- Years active: 2015–present
- Known for: Niko Hamada in Charmed

Ellen Tamaki is an American actress who played Niko Hamada in Charmed (2018–19) and Drea Mikami in Manifest from 2020 to 2022.

== Early life ==
Tamaki is from Brooklyn, New York. She studied acting at the London Academy of Music and Dramatic Art, graduating in 2013. During her time as a student in London, she had theatre appearances as Lady Anne in Richard III and as Casca in Julius Caesar. Tamaki moved to the United States to study at the Boston University College of Fine Arts, graduating in 2014. On May 26, 2020, Tamaki shared via Instagram that she is of Japanese American ethnicity.

== Career ==
Tamaki was working on the One Year Lease Theater Company and Stages Repertory Theatre's production Balls at 59E59 Theaters in New York when the show's protagonist Billie-Jean King (played by Tamaki) showed up in real life to watch the play. After having several small roles in films and television from 2015, her first big break came in 2018, while working in New York theatre, she was offered a main role as the police detective Niko Hamada for 16 episodes of series 1 of the television series Charmed. Tamaki followed that television success with the recurring role of police officer Drea Mikami in the second series of Manifest in 2020. She continued in the role through to season 4 in 2022.

== Filmography ==
=== Film ===
Year	Title	Role	Notes
2015	Searching for Sally Mae	Frankie	
2016	Reptilia	Tina	Short
2016	The Drowning	Barista	
2017	Valentina	Debbie	Short
2018	The Procedure	CNA Nguyen	Short
2018	We Only Know So Much	Taylor	
2019	Inez & Doug & Kira	Valerie	
2021	Fernanda		Short
2025	The Housemaid	Patrice	

=== Television ===
Year	Title	Role	Notes
2017	The Holdouts	Lisa	TV movie
2018	Dichos		1 episode
2018–2019	Charmed	Niko Hamada	Season 1, 15 episodes
2020–2023	Manifest	Drea Mikami	Seasons 2–4, 21 episodes
2022	Girls5eva	Amanda	S2 E3 - "Who U Know"
2023	Die Trying	Lisa	In production
2024	FBI Most Wanted	Tori Sewell	S6 E3 - "White Buffalo"
