= Craig Shapiro =

American film director

Craig Shapiro is a television and film producer, writer and director.

== Filmography ==
- Breakfast with Einstein (1998) – director
- Passport to Paris (1999) – writer
- Our Lips Are Sealed (2000) – writer, director
- Winning London (2001) – director
- The Challenge (2003) – director
- Dr. Dolittle: Tail to the Chief (2008) – director

== Television ==
- The Troop (2010) – writer
- Miami Medical (2010) – writer
- Necessary Roughness (2011–13) – creator, executive producer, writer, director
- Pan Am (2012) – writer
- Girlfriends' Guide to Divorce (2014–15) – executive producer, writer
- Extant (2015) – showrunner, executive producer, writer
- Bull (2016) – writer
- Salvation (2017–18) – creator, showrunner, executive producer, writer
- Charmed (2019–2021) – showrunner, executive producer, writer, director
- The 45 Rules of Divorce (2021) - writer
