= Into the Badlands (TV series) =

American television series

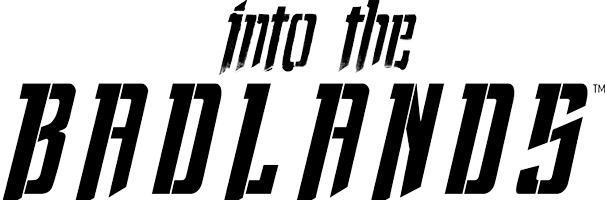
- Genre: Action drama; Science fiction
- Created by: Alfred Gough; Miles Millar
- Starring: Daniel Wu; Orla Brady; Sarah Bolger; Aramis Knight; Emily Beecham; Oliver Stark; Madeleine Mantock; Ally Ioannides; Marton Csokas; Nick Frost; Lorraine Toussaint; Babou Ceesay; Ella-Rae Smith; Sherman Augustus
- Theme music composer: Mike Shinoda
- Composers: Dave Shephard; Trevor Yuile (season 2)
- Country of origin: United States
- Original language: English
- No. of seasons: 3
- No. of episodes: 32

Production
- Executive producers: Daniel Wu; Stephen Fung; David Dobkin; Stacey Sher; Michael Shamberg; Alfred Gough; Miles Millar; Michael Taylor
- Producers: Dee Dee Ku; Dany Wolf; Morgan O'Sullivan; James Flynn; Kari Hobson
- Production locations: New Orleans (season 1); Ireland (seasons 2–3)
- Cinematography: Shane Hurlbut; Owen McPolin (season 2)
- Editors: Vikash Patel; Bridget Durnford; Ben Wilkinson; Anthony Pinker; Erin Deck
- Running time: 42–44 minutes
- Production companies: Film Magic Pictures; Millar Gough Ink; Double Feature Films; AMC Studios

Original release
- Network: AMC
- Release: November 15, 2015 – May 6, 2019

Into the Badlands is an American action drama television series created by Alfred Gough and Miles Millar for AMC. It is set in a post-apocalyptic United States and follows a warrior and a teenage boy who journey through a dangerous feudal land together.

The series premiered on November 15, 2015, and concluded on May 6, 2019, after three seasons consisting of 32 episodes.

== Background ==
Set approximately five hundred years in the future, war has left civilization in ruins. A few elements of technology, such as electricity and ground vehicles, have survived the apocalypse, but society now shuns firearms and relies on melee weaponry and crossbows.

In a territory known as the Badlands, encompassing several states located between the Rocky Mountains and Mississippi River, a feudal society has developed to fill the power vacuum left by the war. Barons control land and monopolies over commodities like opium and fuel, trading amongst themselves to maintain the peace. Each baron is served by slaves called "cogs", as well as a prostitute class called "dolls". A baron maintains power through an army of young men and women called clippers, who are highly trained and loyal warriors. Clippers are forbidden from marrying and having children lest their loyalties be divided. Each clipper force is captained by a regent.

A few groups exist outside the hierarchy imposed by the barons. Nomads are the most common, most of them bandits who steal from trade convoys between the baronies, while others live in organized clans. The River King controls water trade and is considered a neutral party in the barons' power struggles. An ascetic religious movement called the Totemists lives in isolated communities and practices a form of idol worship. The Widow leads a revolutionary group of anti-feudal fighters from her late husband's barony; although recognized as a baron by her peers, they do not respect her, and the contempt is mutual. Little is known of the world beyond the Badlands, but it is implied that it is far less politically stable yet environmentally sound like the Badlands. The mythical utopian city of Azra is believed to exist outside the Badlands, but most dismiss it as a legend.

== Cast and characters ==
=== Main ===
- Daniel Wu as Sunny, the regent to the Badlands' most powerful baron, Quinn. Despite being a man of conviction, he is very loyal to Quinn. Very skilled and proficient in various styles and weapons, he is considered to be one of the deadliest clippers in the Badlands. Veil's lover and Henry's father.
- Orla Brady as Lydia, Quinn's first wife, who is both his fiercest critic and most devoted follower. She partners with The Widow and becomes her Viceroy and takes over Quinn's mansion. She adopts a horse for her Baronial symbol, shown in white on a green banner, and continues to produce opium poppies.
- Sarah Bolger as Jade (seasons 1–2), Quinn's new wife-to-be, whose beguiling demeanor hides a core of ambition and tenacity which she uses to manipulate others. She later marries her stepson, Ryder, after Quinn's presumed death.
- Aramis Knight as M.K., a seemingly average teenage boy who is anything but. Lurking inside him is a dark energy that the Widow wants to harness into a weapon.
- Emily Beecham as Minerva, better known as The Widow, the Badlands' newest baron; a brilliant martial artist. She has adopted a blue-winged butterfly as her baronial symbol, shown in yellow on a light blue banner. It represents a transformation from insignificance to beauty and power. Her territory produces crude oil.
- Oliver Stark as Ryder (seasons 1–2), Quinn's only son and presumed heir. Ryder later takes over as baron after his father's presumed death, along with marrying his stepmother, Jade.
- Madeleine Mantock as Veil (seasons 1–2), a doctor who is in a secret relationship with Sunny. Henry's mother
- Ally Ioannides as Tilda, a teenage assassin well-trained in the martial arts, she is the Widow's adopted daughter and later becomes her regent. At the end of the second season, she has abandoned Minerva's cause and started a renegade band of bandits in the third season who steal precious supplies across the Badlands under the alias as their leader called "Iron Rabbit".
- Marton Csokas as Quinn (seasons 1–2), the Badlands' preeminent baron and a former clipper. His baronial symbol is an armadillo shown in white on a maroon banner. His territory produces opium poppy, which are harvested for opium.
- Nick Frost as Bajie (seasons 2–3), a schemer with questionable morals who finds himself allied with Sunny. Based on Zhu Bajie.
- Lorraine Toussaint as Cressida (season 3), high priestess of Pilgrim and his followers.
- Ella-Rae Smith as Nix (season 3), a member of Pilgrim's followers who has the Gift and is close friends with Castor.
- Sherman Augustus as Nathaniel Moon (season 3; guest season 2), a former clipper who fights with honor, looking for his 1000th Clip. Battled Sunny; after he lost, wanted to be killed but lost his hand instead. He becomes the Widow's regent, and is tasked with tracking down Sunny.
- Babou Ceesay as Pilgrim (season 3), a self-described "Son of Azra". He is the leader of the Totemists, worshipers who are with him to recreate Azra in the Badlands. Can control those with the Gift, including Nix, Castor and M.K. His real name is Taurin and he is one of the last survivors of Azra alongside Sunny and Kannin.

=== Recurring ===
- Mike Seal as Petri (season 1), one of Quinn's clippers.
- Stephen Lang as Waldo (seasons 1–2), a paraplegic former regent serving under Quinn and later the Widow.
- Teressa Liane as Angelica (season 1), a prostitute and spy loyal to The Widow.
- Edi Gathegi as Baron Jacobee (season 1), who has an alliance with Quinn. His baronial colors are a pattern of blue and green plaid.
- Lance E. Nichols as the River King (seasons 1 and 3), an importer and exporter of goods and cogs (indentured servants) up and down the river through the Badlands.
- Lance Henriksen as Penrith (seasons 1–2), Lydia's father and the leader of a Totemist religious commune.
- Cung Le as Cyan (seasons 1–2), head Abbott who journeys with his fellow Abbotts, Ramona and Dury, searching for those who have abilities.
- Eve Connolly as Ava (season 2), a fighting instructor who works with M.K.
- Stephen Walters as the Engineer (season 2), boss of the pickers (miners) in the Bordeaux Mines.
- Chipo Chung as the Master (seasons 2–3), leader of the Abbott who trains M.K., teaching him how to control his abilities.
- Maddison Jaizani as Odessa (seasons 2–3), a former Doll who becomes one of The Widow's Butterflies, and later is Tilda's lover.
- Eleanor Matsuura as Baroness Juliet Chau (seasons 2–3), who wants Quinn dead. She has adopted a fox as her baronial symbol, shown in black on a cream colored banner. Her baronial color is mostly white.
- Dean-Charles Chapman as Castor (season 3), a member of Pilgrim's followers who has the Gift and is friends with Nix.
- Lewis Tan as Gaius Chau (season 3), brother of Juliet Chau who has a childhood history with Minerva.
- Thom Ashley as Eli (season 3), a novice fighter who possesses the gift and is friends with M.K.
- Sophia Di Martino as Lily (season 3), a smuggler and Bajie's ex-wife.
- Eugenia Yuan as Kannin (season 3), Sunny's sister and a member of the Black Lotus.

== Episodes ==
=== Series overview ===
Season	Episodes	Originally released	
Season	Episodes	First released	Last released
1	6	November 15, 2015	December 20, 2015
2	10	March 19, 2017	May 21, 2017
3	16	April 22, 2018	May 6, 2019

=== Season 1 (2015) ===
No. overall	No. in season	Title	Directed by	Written by	Original release date	U.S. viewers (millions)
1	1	"The Fort"	David Dobkin	Alfred Gough & Miles Millar	November 15, 2015	6.39
Sunny, is a highly skilled fighter and the deadliest "Head Clipper" for Baron Quinn, battles the Nomads to rescue a mysterious boy named M.K. who harbors a dark secret about his past. But when he brings him back to The Fort to train as a "Colt", a Clipper-in-training, things quickly get out of hand with another trainee. When first blood is drawn, M.K. loses control of himself as if something takes over his body, making the boy valuable to an opposing baron, the Widow. Meanwhile, Sunny discovers M.K.'s pendant has the same image as the one on his childhood compass of a place called Azra, the boy's home. In order to seek out the truth about his own past, Sunny wants to know more of this city beyond the Badlands, and must find a way out, especially now that his lover Veil is illegally pregnant with his child.
2	2	"Fist Like a Bullet"	David Dobkin	Alfred Gough & Miles Millar	November 22, 2015	4.83
After wandering into the Widow's territory, M.K. meets the Widow's daughter Tilda, whom he follows for refuge in her mother's mansion. But it turns out to be a dangerous place since she wants to use his dark power to overthrow the other barons. Meanwhile, after Quinn's headaches are diagnosed by his long-time doctor as a tumor, he doesn't have long to live. He wants to keep the news a secret, so he orders Sunny to "clip" the doctor and his wife, Veil's parents, who know about their unborn baby. However, Sunny refuses and Quinn has to murder them himself, and gives him a second chance to test his loyalty. Later, when Sunny and Ryder are attacked by the Widow's nomads, M.K. saves Sunny's life and agrees to show him the way out of the Badlands. But Sunny has a condition; he will bring M.K. back to the Fort for training so he can be strong enough to smuggle Veil and the baby out.
3	3	"White Stork Spreads Wings"	David Dobkin	Alfred Gough & Miles Millar & Justine Juel Gillmer	November 29, 2015	5.17
Quinn seeks retribution against The Widow and pays the price with losing many Clippers in his surprise attack. M.K. breaks away from the Colts to steal the book about Azra in the Widow's study, where Tilda sees him. Sunny begins to train M.K., but he must first learn discipline, especially when he underestimates Waldo during their fight because Waldo uses a wheelchair. As Ryder's life slowly fades away, Jade desperately seeks help from Veil who reluctantly yet successfully treats him. But it results in Quinn knowing about her and Sunny's relationship. In order for Quinn to form an alliance with Jacobee, the one baron who hates him least, Sunny must reunite with Zypher, Jacobee's regent to arrange a meeting. M.K. brings the book to Veil to be translated, but it is in a language she does not recognize. As M.K. hides, Veil is interrupted by Quinn, who wants her to save him from his deadly illness.
4	4	"Two Tigers Subdue Dragons"	Guy Ferland	Alfred Gough & Miles Millar & Michael Jones-Morales	December 6, 2015	2.42
Sunny has to figure out how to control M.K.'s power, especially when he gets knocked out by a single punch. Jade prepares for her wedding, and taking Lydia's advice, she stops her relationship with Ryder, who feels broken and betrayed. Sunny finds out Veil has been helping M.K. translate the Azra book and treating Quinn for his tumor. Later, Quinn sets a parlay with Baron Jacobee to help him defeat The Widow after she beheads one of his Clippers. Both barons meet in the City of the Dead at Cross Bend where problems arise. M.K. spies a disguised Tilda and gives pursuit and they fight. Tilda cuts him, unleashing his darkness that only she can stop. Ryder is enlisted by Zypher who is secretly working for The Widow to join their cause to start a war. Waldo grants Sunny an audience with the River King, importer of goods and cogs, to reserve a passage out of the Badlands. However, the River King demands M.K.'s head as payment due to M.K. having previously killed some of his Cogs.
5	5	"Snake Creeps Down"	Guy Ferland	Alfred Gough & Miles Millar & Justin Doble	December 13, 2015	2.21
Sunny finds a direction when he uses his broken compass in the Azra book's cutout. After the poppy fields are abandoned, Quinn has a migraine and puts Jade in charge to train Clippers how to harvest. In order to look for "the boy at the Fort", The Widow takes in Quinn's cogs, promising them freedom in return for loyalty. Waldo tells Ryder to take M.K.'s pendant to Ryder's grandfather Penrith, a preacher, who says Azra is just a made-up story. Veil asks Quinn if he killed her parents and he says it was Sunny's blade that ended their lives, not his. When Sunny brings Petri and his Colt, Bale, to track the Widow and her Butterflies, Tilda warns M.K. that every time he is cut, his life force gets weaker. A fight ensues between her mother (the Widow) and Sunny, while Bale, wanting to make his first kill, fights Tilda but meets a deadly end when M.K. cuts himself to save her.
6	6	"Hand of Five Poisons"	Guy Ferland	Alfred Gough & Miles Millar & Michael R. Perry	December 20, 2015	2.16
After his failure to finish off The Widow, Quinn suspects that Sunny is a traitor and imprisons him. Meanwhile, Jade frames Lydia for trying to poison her, resulting in Quinn exiling her. With no other choice, Lydia returns to Penrith and rejoins her father's congregation. Later, Tilda kidnaps Veil, asking her to treat The Widow's wounds. Veil warns Tilda that her mother does not truly love her. She leaves two bottles of poison and the tincture, making it Tilda's choice whether to kill her or not. Instead, Tilda confronts the Widow, who insists she's trying to save M.K. and explains she was once special like him. When M.K. escapes, Quinn convinces him to join his ranks in return for sparing Tilda's and Sunny's lives; he agrees. Sunny is freed by Waldo and urges him to leave the Badlands, but he goes in search of M.K. At the Dollhouse, Quinn is ambushed by Ryder who teamed up with Jacobee and Zypher. Quinn triggers M.K.'s abilities and he quickly disposes of them all. Sunny shows up, impales Quinn with his sword, and attempts to subdue M.K. However, three Abbotts arrive and easily defeat them, revealing they have the same abilities as M.K., and take him away. In order to secure transportation out of the Badlands, Sunny had presented Bale's head to the River King, to pass off as M.K.'s. But the River King finds out and knows Sunny tried to cheat him. The River King captures him, intending to sell Sunny to the highest bidder.

=== Season 2 (2017) ===
No. overall	No. in season	Title	Directed by	Written by	Original release date	U.S. viewers (millions)
7	1	"Tiger Pushes Mountain"	Nick Copus	Alfred Gough & Miles Millar	March 19, 2017	3.44
Six months later, Sunny, now a "Picker", a miner used for slave labor, excavates coal in the Bordeaux Mines far from the Badlands. He befriends Bajie, a smuggler who is shackled to him. After watching an arena fight in which under-performing Pickers are executed for not making their quota, Sunny plans to escape. Bajie acquires a map and wants to go with him. When Sunny refuses, Bajie betrays his true identity to the mine boss, The Engineer. Meanwhile, M.K. undergoes training from the Abbotts under the tutelage of Ava. Later, M.K. meets the Master, who promises his freedom if he can learn to control his abilities and oversees his training. In the Badlands, Ryder, as Baron following his father's presumed death, controls Quinn, Jacobee, and the Widow's territories, alongside his love, Jade. During an inspection of the oil fields, The Widow and Tilda, now a regent, return. In a surprise attack they reclaim them, kill most of Ryder's Clippers and force him to retreat. They preside over a growing army of former Cogs and Dolls, promising to end the Badlands feudal system and replace it with a democratic society. Tilda recruits Odessa, a former doll, and has the clippers who abused the dolls killed. While stationed in an abandoned train station, Veil gives birth to a boy and is in the company of Quinn, who survived his impalement.
8	2	"Force of Eagle's Claw"	Nick Copus	Matt Lambert	March 26, 2017	3.41
After Bajie betrays Sunny, The Engineer decides he doesn't like a "rat" for a Picker so he sends them to the fighting pit to battle his champion Mouse. Fortunately, the arena is unguarded. They defeat their foe, make it to the exit and escape through the mine's ventilation system. They find themselves in the Outlying Territories with a wall separating them from the Badlands. Meanwhile, Tilda learns how to be a proper Regent from Waldo who is working for The Widow. Lydia is living with Penrith and his Totemists. All is peaceful until Nomads interrupt a wedding, looking for goods. Lydia takes it upon herself to save the religious group by killing all the bandits herself, resulting in her father's disapproval due to his nonviolent beliefs. She is once again cast out and returns to Ryder, who doesn't receive her kindly. Also, the Master sends M.K. to her room of mirrors in order to conquer his inner demon: himself. Later, while hiding out in the abandoned West Avalon transit station, Quinn performs a bloody baptism on Veil's son, Henry, who he proclaims is the Badlands newest heir.
9	3	"Red Sun, Silver Moon"	Toa Fraser	Michael Taylor	April 2, 2017	3.11
While wandering the Outlying Territories, Sunny and Bajie find a bridge that leads into the Badlands, but it is guarded by a stranger and they've been followed by bounty hunters. The stranger lends them a helping hand defeating the bounty hunters and gives them shelter. They learn that he's the legendary Clipper Regent Nathaniel Moon, "Silver Moon" who, like Sunny, left the Badlands to live a violence-free life. After he fell in love with a warlord's daughter, he started a family, but they were murdered. Now he hunts fugitives, returning to his violent ways. He tries to convince Sunny that men like them never change. Meanwhile, The Widow asks Waldo to be her Second at the Baron conclave instead of Tilda, but she is in charge if she doesn't return. Veil lies to Quinn about his prognoses by switching out his x-rays with healthy ones. M.K. discovers that the Abbotts are up to something when his friend Tate is experimented on, draining his abilities. Later Silver Moon, still searching for his 1,000th kill mark, sees Sunny as a worthy opponent. He challenges Sunny to a fight to the death or to put him out of his misery by ending his life. Sunny continues on his quest to find his family and does not want to be his executioner; Bajie comes to his aid.
10	4	"Palm of the Iron Fox"	Toa Fraser	Daniel C. Connolly	April 9, 2017	1.57
Quinn puts his plan in motion to start anew and sets off with his Clippers. Meanwhile, before the conclave voting ceremony, The Widow tries to get Baron Chau on her side and thinks about her condition of pledging not to shelter any more runaway Cogs at her Sanctuary. Later, M.K. takes one of the Master's opium-infused origami and returns to the room of mirrors, this time to find out what happened to his mother, but learns that her blood is on his hands. When Quinn is off on his mission, Veil, trapped at the transit station with lone Clipper Edgar, tries to escape with Henry in her arms by drugging him, however he blocks her only way out. During the conclave, the five remaining Barons vote The Widow in breach of the Foundation Treaty, stripped of her baron title, and her lands and privileges are revoked. They give her 48 hours to vacate the Badlands, but she has no intention of giving it up and a baronial showdown is about to begin. Just then, Quinn makes a dramatic entrance first and goes after Ryder, killing his son in the middle of his hedge maze. In the end, Tilda shows up at the melee and helps Waldo and her mother in their fight for a Cog-free world.
11	5	"Monkey Leaps Through Mist"	Paco Cabezas	LaToya Morgan	April 16, 2017	1.42
With Ryder dead, the other surviving Barons have fled, going underground. Jade, the only successor, is sworn in as Baron by her Regent, Merrick, and declares war. She then turns to Lydia for help in finding Quinn. However, Lydia has one condition; she gets to kill Quinn herself. Meanwhile, Bajie takes Sunny to Nos, the Commandant of the Mechs, or metal traders, to trade Silver Moon's sword for a shortcut back into the Badlands. Sunny learns from the leader that Quinn is still alive. During their overnight stay, a Doll named Portia visits Sunny asking him to kill Nos so her young daughter Amelia will not lead a life of prostitution. He refuses at first, but after seeing Portia's face mutilated and her stabbed, he and Bajie steal their ride, bringing mother and daughter with them. Also, while training, M.K. escapes the Abbotts and disguises himself with clothes from a corpse that was hanged nearby. Later, The Widow ignores Waldo's advice, to either align with the other Barons who tried to kill her or lose everything she built, instead aligning herself with Quinn. Lydia and the Clippers seek out Quinn, but the bunker doors are booby trapped, and she loses most of her men. In the commotion, Veil finds her way out of the transit station and flees from Quinn, who is having hallucinations of his dead son.
12	6	"Leopard Stalks in Snow"	Paco Cabezas	Matt Lambert	April 23, 2017	1.31
In the aftermath of the transit station explosion, Lydia loses all her men and is captured by Quinn who offers her a chance to avenge their son with a dagger to his heart. Unlike Ryder, she doesn't hesitate, but Quinn stops her hand from the killing blow, then has an intimate moment. Meanwhile, after their escape from the Mechs; Bajie and Sunny go to Portia's healer friend, located in a Gasper addicts opium den. Veil finds temporary solace at the Widow's Sanctuary, but the Widow makes an unholy alliance with Quinn and hands her and baby Henry over to him. Also, Tilda gets closer to Odessa by telling her why she calls Minerva "mother" and they share an intimate moment witnessed by Waldo. Later, Ava finds M.K., who seems to have lost his power after a skirmish with a Nomad, leaving him bloody. They make camp at an Old World hotel left abandoned during Christmas 2024. Sunny and M.K. reunite, but he's followed by the three Abbotts, Cyan, Ramona, and Dury, seeking out M.K's darkness with an Azraian device. A melee ensues and they're quickly defeated until Bajie shows up, revealing his secret of being an Abbott in another life. Ava dies from her injuries after saving M.K. while Sunny suddenly collapses from a mysterious blow to the chest.
13	7	"Black Heart, White Mountain"	Stephen Fung	Michael Taylor	April 30, 2017	1.42
After a dying Cyan attacked him with the hand of the Five Poisons, a poisoned and comatose Sunny is trapped in a nightmare in which he must confront his inner demons. In the dream, he is living a simple life as a farmer with Veil and Henry who has grown into a boy. Things quickly escalate as the poison seeps through his body, causing all the victims he clipped, including a girl named Artemis, to kill him. Bajie and M.K. infiltrate the Abbott monastery to gather medical supplies and special needles in order to revive Sunny, along with Sunny's Azra compass that Bajie secretly steals. Later, Bajie explains his departure from the monastery. He had a loving relationship with his novice Flea, who had dark abilities similar to M.K., and wishes to find her. Meanwhile, Quinn and the Widow assault Jade's palace in order to exile her from the Badlands.
14	8	"Sting of the Scorpion's Tail"	Stephen Fung	LaToya Morgan	May 7, 2017	1.29
Quinn and the Widow prove their alliance by presenting their gifts: Baron Hassan and Baron Broadmore's heads. Meanwhile, Bajie gets Sunny and M.K. out of the Outlying Territories and through the wall into the Badlands. But it comes at a price when they're captured by Baron Chau's Clippers. However, Sunny devises a plan to get them out by proposing to Chau he knows how to lure The Widow out. He becomes Chau's Regent, slips Bajie the cell key to his freedom, and delivers M.K. to the Widow in order to find Quinn's hideout. Sunny and the Widow's reunion is a bloody one as they work together, alongside M.K. and Tilda, fighting the Clippers. Later, Veil is forced to marry Quinn so he can help raise Henry, grooming him as his heir to the baroncy. Their consummation is interrupted by a report that Sunny is alive, and has joined forces with the Widow and is coming to find Quinn.
15	9	"Nightingale Sings No More"	Paco Cabezas	Justin Britt-Gibson	May 14, 2017	1.56
Twenty years ago, Bajie, an Abbott is tasked with training a new novice who, due to her powerful "Gift", is brought to the monastery in a large chest. She breaks free and Bajie has to subdue her, and because of her small size, he nicknames her Flea. However, her name is Minerva and she carries the book of Azra that's been in her family for generations. Back in the present, Sunny aligns with the Widow, who offers him and M.K., now without his abilities, sanctuary. The Widow plans to attack Quinn's bunker, but Quinn sends his young Clipper Gabriel strapped with a suicide bomb to deliver Sunny a message about Veil, and learns that the Widow traded her to Quinn. In the chaos of the explosion, Sunny escapes and runs into Bajie, telling him to get M.K. out and meet him at the bunker. Bajie reunites with Minerva, but it is not the reunion he wanted since he and M.K. are captured trying to steal the Azra book. Later, Tilda confronts the Widow about how she has become like the rest of the barons: power-hungry and sacrificing innocent lives. The two fight, and Tilda is defeated.
16	10	"Wolf's Breath, Dragon Fire"	Paco Cabezas	Alfred Gough, Miles Millar & Matt Lambert	May 21, 2017	1.37
While M.K. remains in the Widow's clutches, forcing him to get his Gift back, Odessa frees Bajie and a crippled Tilda from captivity with the aid of Waldo. Bajie helps Sunny in his assault on Quinn's bunker. During the assault, Bajie is wounded by one of Quinn's lieutenants before disappearing, and Lydia is saved from execution. Meanwhile, Sunny is reunited with Veil and fights a final battle with Quinn. Badly wounded, Quinn grabs Veil and tries to take her hostage and gives him an ultimatum; either Sunny gives him Henry or he will kill Veil. Refusing to let Quinn have the upper hand, Veil fatally impales both herself and Quinn with his own sai. With her dying breath, Veil implores Sunny to raise their son to be good. Later, an injured Bajie rides Sunny's motorcycle to a derelict communications tower and reactivates it with the Azra compass, sending out a Morse code before collapsing from his stab wound.

=== Season 3 (2018–19) ===
No. overall	No. in season	Title	Directed by	Written by	Original release date	U.S. viewers (millions)
17	1	"Enter the Phoenix"	Paco Cabezas	Matt Lambert	April 22, 2018	1.35
It has been six months since Sunny returned to the Badlands, which is now ravaged by a civil war between the only two remaining barons: The Widow and Chau. Sunny reunites with Bajie to seek a cure for his infant son Henry, who has The Gift. Enefaa "Ene Baba" and Tilda, known as the "Iron Rabbit", and her band of thieves are stealing from The Widow and protecting Lydia in a Totemist camp. Meanwhile, M.K. is being held captive by the Widow, who is trying to restore his power. She also recruits Moon, who is in hiding following his fight with Sunny which left him with one hand.
18	2	"Moon Rises, Raven Seeks"	Paco Cabezas	Matt Lambert	April 29, 2018	1.27
After receiving Bajie's signal, Pilgrim, the self-styled "son of Azra", along with his Acolytes, travels a long way in search for a new kingdom in the Badlands. They find such a place in a ruined castle on an island, which contains a natural history museum. Moon joins The Widow as her Regent and is tasked with finding Bajie, who is vital in the war effort. Sunny learns he passed The Gift to his son Henry. He and Bajie seek help from Lydia who tells them about Ankara, the Mad Witch who processes knowledge about The Dark Ones. Wanting answers, they set out north to her rumored location at Vulture's Peak. Later, the Widow struggles to control M.K., who tries to kill himself with opium. She demands the Iron Rabbit's head, not realizing that her adversary is Tilda.
19	3	"Leopard Snares Rabbit"	Toa Fraser	Michael Taylor	May 6, 2018	0.97
Moon raids Tilda's refugee camp on orders to capture the Iron Rabbit, and takes Odessa hostage to lure her out. Lydia decides to play both sides and partners with The Widow as her Viceroy and she takes over Quinn's mansion. Meanwhile, disguised as The Widow's Clippers, Sunny and Bajie make their way to the frontlines and leave Henry with a healer while they find a way out of the war zone to search for a cure. Tilda confronts her mother and makes a deal that she'll return in exchange for M.K.'s freedom. M.K. regains his Gift after finally remembering that Sunny was the one who killed his mother.
20	4	"Blind Cannibal Assassins"	Toa Fraser	Michael Taylor	May 13, 2018	1.20
While traveling through the Wasteland, Sunny and Bajie confront a band of blind cannibals. They are former renegade Clippers who were tracked down and blinded by Quinn's forces which included Sunny when he was a Colt. They join forces with Moon who was also captured by the assassins, and his honor is satisfied when he spares Sunny because of his son. Baron Chau enlists her imprisoned brother, Gaius, to clip Pilgrim, who is recruiting Cogs from her territory. Meanwhile, The Widow and Lydia try to befriend Pilgrim, and save his life in the process during Chau's attack. Later, M.K. goes on the run, intending to kill Sunny, believing he murdered his mother.
21	5	"Carry Tiger to Mountain"	James Marshall	LaToya Morgan	May 20, 2018	1.08
Sunny and Bajie reach Vulture's Peak and seek help from the reclusive witch Ankara, who temporally heals Henry's darkness. She tells Sunny someone powerful dispelled his Gift as a child, and in doing so, made him a Catalyst, from where the dark gift flows through him. She also declares that Sunny may be the most powerful of them all. Nix saves M.K. in the forest, and he later meets Pilgrim, who wants to use his powers to usher in a new era of blood and chaos in the name of Azra. The Widow confronts Gaius, Chau's brother and an acquaintance from her past when she served his father as Chau's Cog. He agrees to help fight his sister's Clippers who, along with Castor, ransacked Tilda's refugee camp.
22	6	"Black Wind Howls"	James Marshall	Evan Endicott & Josh Stoddard	June 3, 2018	0.92
While making their way through an unsavory part of the Badlands full of pirates and thieves, Sunny and Bajie meet Lily, Bajie's ex-wife turned smuggler. She reluctantly agrees to take them on her boat to find the new Azra. During the night, Sunny has visions of himself as a boy on board Lily's boat which once belonged to the River King. They soon encounter River King seeking their bounties, but form a temporary alliance. Tilda rejoins her mother after Chau took some refugees and the two meet up with Pilgrim. The Widow gives Pilgrim her captive, the injured Castor as a peace offering. However, with M.K. now on Pilgrim's side, Pilgrim consoles Castor and then kills him by snapping his neck.
23	7	"Dragonfly's Last Dance"	Paco Cabezas	LaToya Morgan	June 10, 2018	1.06
Sunny and Bajie work with the River King to secure passage to Pilgrim's fortress. However, Sunny learns that as a child he was on a boat that was attacked by the Black Lotus, a group of fearsome warriors looking for him. Sunny seeks out Captain Udo, the last survivor who tells him about the massacre and that he had a sister who protected him. Meanwhile, The Widow faces a mutiny from her Butterflies and Bowlers who are tired of sacrificing life and limb from the war with Baron Chau. Under the leadership of Wren, a former fighter, they hold her and Gaius captive. However, Lydia negotiates an armistice with the turncoats and seeks out Moon and Tilda to rescue them. Back on the river, when the River King tries to sell out Sunny to the Black Lotus, Sunny kills him and Lily takes over to become the River Queen.
24	8	"Leopard Catches Cloud"	Paco Cabezas	Matt Lambert	June 17, 2018	0.89
Sunny and Bajie arrive at Pilgrim's Fortress, but they do not receive a warm welcome. Sunny fights an angry M.K., who makes him remember he killed his mother as a Clipper. After surviving the melee, Sunny meets Pilgrim and learns that his real name is Sanzo and in order to cure his son, they must open the Meridian Chamber, an ancient underground vault from the Old World which Pilgrim's acolytes recently unearthed. Bajie discovers they want to make an army of Dark Ones for a new Azra, but Sunny feels he has no choice until Henry is cured. Pilgrim explains that Sunny is the key to unlocking Azra's power and then cures Henry by transferring the child’s Gift to himself. Later, The Widow, Gaius and Tilda storm White Bone, Chau's mansion while Moon battles her troops and Lydia holds the line against a counter-attack.
25	9	"Chamber of the Scorpion"	Wayne Yip	Evan Endicott & Josh Stoddard	March 24, 2019	1.25
The Widow is taken to the Mountain by The Master who shows that even though they are fighting different battles, they must work together to defeat Pilgrim who has taken The Gift from Henry. Meanwhile, with Henry cured, Sunny decides to leave Pilgrim's fortress and frees Bajie who has been kept prisoner. Gaius and Tilda find that Chau is alive but find no trace of The Widow. Believing he is now a god, Pilgrim transfers the Gift to eight of his followers whom he now calls Azra's Harbingers. Bajie kills one of his dark-eyed Harbingers in a fight for survival and Sunny helps him escape. Later, Sunny destroys the Meridian Chamber, but he is caught by the vengeful M.K., who takes him to Pilgrim. Pilgrim mercilessly attacks Sunny with his new powers and then throws him through a window into the water far below.
26	10	"Raven's Feather, Phoenix Blood"	Wayne Yip	Michael Taylor	March 25, 2019	0.59
After agreeing to help The Master to save the world from Pilgrim, The Widow is rendered unconscious and sent on quest to regain her "Gift". This vision takes place in an alternate reality where The Widow is a baron known as the crimson-garbed Phoenix who rules the Badlands with a deadly fist. With Gaius Chau as her right-hand-man, she tries to locate a mysterious baron named The Raven, who is actually The Widow herself. A battle ensues, which is a manifestation of The Widow reconciling the light and dark sides of her personality. Meanwhile, Sunny survives the battle with Pilgrim and he hides out in an abandoned department store. He is found by Nix, who has come to question Pilgrim's "cause" and she helps him survive in a fight against the pursuing Harbingers.
27	11	"The Boar and the Butterfly"	Tricia Brock	Matt Lambert & Stephanie Hicks	April 1, 2019	0.61
Nix helps Sunny in his temporary hideout in the abandoned store and she agrees to help him find Ankara the Mad Witch. M.K. shows up, but they get the better of him and escape. Tilda and Gaius sneak into his mother's fortress, and Tilda brutally kills her mother. The Master reunites The Widow and Bajie, who have a therapeutic showdown. Ankara is found wounded by the Black Lotus and taken to a nearby city by Sunny and Nix. Bajie and The Widow arrive at the city where a fight breaks out between Sunny and The Widow. Pilgrim and his Harbingers make their way to the Monastery to get more recruits for his Dark-Eyed Army as per M.K.'s intel.
28	12	"Cobra Fang, Panther Claw"	Tricia Brock	Evan Endicott & Josh Stoddard	April 8, 2019	0.41
Pilgrim and his Harbingers arrive at the Monastery and battle the Abbots, making short work of them. A fight breaks out between Pilgrim and The Master when she refuses to give up the "dark ones she put to sleep". Pilgrim gets the upper-hand turning off The Master's gift, but spares her. Pilgrim and M.K. find the secret to waking up the sleepers. Sunny, Bajie, The Widow, and Nix transport Ankara the Mad Witch back to the Monastery while The Black Lotus tracks them. The Widow leaves to find Tilda and Gaius when Ankara shows her a vision of them being tortured, and Nix comes along. Tilda and Gaius head to the location where Baron Chau's hideout in an abandoned circus, but it is a trap and Chau tortures them both for information. The Widow faces off with Baron Chau, beheading her in the end of their fight to save Tilda and Gaius. The Black Lotus along with Ankara arrive at a barn Bajie and Sunny are and attacks them. Ankara tells Sunny that he needs his sister in order to defeat Pilgrim. Sunny and Bajie get incapacitated with flash bangs, and Ankara is killed. They take Sunny, but when Bajie wakes up, he is stabbed through the abdomen and breathes his last breaths.
29	13	"Black Lotus, White Rose"	Miles Millar	Alfred Gough & Miles Millar	April 15, 2019	0.40
Sunny is brought into a large prison called Razor Ridge, which is a Black Lotus outpost. Magnus tells Sunny that Bajie is dead before his sister comes out of the shadows. She's with the Black Lotus and not dead as Ankara told him. Sunny doesn't believe her until she touches his forehead to unlock some of his memories. Her name is Kannin. We see a young Sunny and a young Pilgrim practicing together. We see Azra, and it is beautiful. Magnus says that the "dark ones" were the ones that destroyed the old world. Young Sunny and Young Pilgrim receive their Azra pendants as the guardians of Azra. Sunny's dad then receives a message and takes Sunny with him to the courtyard where three Black Lotus are being held on their knees. When they won't speak, Sunny's dad goes dark and kills two of them. He then sits a timer on a rock and tells Sunny that if he doesn't tell them how he got there before the time runs out, Sunny is to kill him. He tells young Sunny that killing is his destiny when the boy says he doesn't want to do it. Turns out that Ankara is not quite dead as she uses her last bit of powers to revive Bajie... he's alive! Pilgrim is bleeding black from his eyes from using the gift. He welcomes the new recruits who were sleeping.
30	14	"Curse of the Red Rain"	Miles Millar	Michael Taylor	April 22, 2019	0.65
Cressida confronts Lydia and Moon about their failure to deliver on her request. The Widow sticks a sword to her throat and claims her as a prisoner. Back at the Monastery, Bajie discovers that Pilgrim has woken up the sleepers, and Sunny is now concerned about getting back to Henry. Kannin tells them that she knows a back way into the Badlands, but Bajie isn't sure he trusts her. Sunny insists that they should go. Word reaches Pilgrim that Cressida has been taken, and he is ready to get on the warpath. Minerva (The Widow) is pregnant. Cressida, from her cell, carries out a blood ritual and large red storm clouds appear and rain blood all over the fort and the people in it. Sunny, Bajie, and Kannin reach the end of their trail and arrive at the sea. Kannin has lied to them and asks that they leave. Sunny and Bajie leave her with Sunny wanting to get Henry back. Cressida kills Lydia.
31	15	"Requiem for the Fallen"	Paco Cabezas	Matt Lambert	April 29, 2019	0.50
Pilgrim's remaining forces breach into the Widow's compound and he beheads Nix. Kannin attempts to get Cressida to recognize that Pilgrim's stolen gift has corrupted his soul and driven him insane. Pilgrim steals Kannin's gift, leaving her unable to defeat him or restore Sunny's gift. However, Cressida looks into the future and discovers a dead world that Pilgrim calls his new Azra before killing her. The Widow learns that she is pregnant by Gaius and contemplates whether or not to keep the child while M.K., heavily scarred from the explosion, becomes vengeful toward the Widow. To fight Pilgrim, Sunny, Bajie and Gaius attempt to recruit the Black Lotus, but Magnus refuses and initiates a fight. With Kannin's help, the Black Lotus are defeated and Kannin snaps Magnus' neck before demanding the Black Lotus join with them.
32	16	"Seven Strike as One"	Paco Cabezas	Alfred Gough & Miles Millar & Matt Lambert	May 6, 2019	0.46
Pilgrim furthers his crusade, now determined that anyone who refuses the gift will die. Frightened by her vision and disillusioned by Pilgrim's growing insanity, Cressida takes the sacred scrolls and flees, narrowly escaping an attempt by Moon on her life. As Sunny, Bajie, Kannin, and the Black Lotus attack Pilgrim's fortress, the Widow, Tilda, and Gaius attempt to destroy the Meridian Chamber but are confronted by a vengeful M.K. After M.K. inadvertently severely wounds Tilda, the Widow's anger reactivates her gift, and she kills M.K. before she and Gaius blow up the chamber as they leave to get Tilda help. Pilgrim's army is defeated, but he proves to be more than a match for Sunny, Bajie, and Kannin. After Sunny is mortally wounded, the three come together to finally defeat Pilgrim, who is killed by Sunny before he dies. In the realm between life and death, Sunny is greeted by the Master who reveals that Sunny's own gift was reactivated in his last moments and will bring him back in time. However, the Master warns of a greater threat than Pilgrim that is emerging, one that is more powerful and insidious than any human. In the ruins of the Meridian Chamber, Eli, one of M.K.'s friends, discovers a weapon from the old world: a working gun that he test-fires.

== Production ==
Described as a "genre-bending martial arts series", the story is loosely based on the classic Chinese tale Journey to the West. AMC ordered six one-hour-long episodes of the action-drama developed by AMC Studios for a premiere in late 2015. Executive producer Stephen Fung also serves as the series' action director alongside veteran Hong Kong choreographer, Ku Huen-chiu. AMC renewed the show for a 10-episode second season, which premiered on March 19, 2017. On April 25, 2017, AMC renewed the series for a 16-episode third season which premiered on April 22, 2018.

The series was filmed in Louisiana for the first season, but production then moved to Ireland, shooting around Dublin and County Wicklow.

On February 9, 2019, AMC announced that the series would end after season 3, with its final episode airing May 9. Sherman Augustus has stated that there were originally plans for a fourth season, which would have explored the lore behind the show's post-apocalyptic setting. He has also claimed that there were plans for a spin-off series which were ultimately scrapped. Alfred Gough and Miles Millar later revealed that the planned spin-off would have been set 20 years after the events of the original show, following Sunny's son Henry and The Widow's daughter as young adults in a town run by Nick Frost's Bajie, who would have acted as a mentor figure.

== Broadcast ==
Internationally, the series premiered in Australia on November 17, 2015, on Showcase. In Germany, Austria, Italy, and the UK, the series is available through Amazon Prime Instant Video with each episode accessible the day after the U.S. air date. BBC America began airing double episodes on August 20, 2016.

== Home media ==
Complete Season	DVD/Blu-ray Release dates			Additional info
Complete Season	Region 1/A	Region 2/B	Region 4/C	Additional info
1	November 8, 2016	December 7, 2016	December 7, 2016	The Blu-ray/DVD box-sets include featurettes, making of the fight scenes, the characters of the series, and a digital comic.
2	March 13, 2018	n/a	n/a	Deleted scenes.
3	August 27, 2019	n/a	n/a	

== Reception ==
=== Critical response ===
The first season received mixed reviews from critics. The review aggregator website Rotten Tomatoes reported a 54% approval rating with an average rating of 4.72/10 based on 39 reviews. The website's critical consensus reads, "Into the Badlands is loaded with off-kilter potential that's left largely unfulfilled -- although its well-choreographed action sequences should satisfy martial arts fans." Metacritic, which uses a weighted average, assigned a score of 54 out of 100 based on 29 critics, indicating "mixed or average reviews".

The second season received positive reviews from critics. Rotten Tomatoes reports a 100% approval rating with an average rating of 7.53/10 based on 6 reviews.

The third season also received favorable reviews. Rotten Tomatoes reports an 88% approval based on 8 reviews.

Tim Goodman of The Hollywood Reporter gave a generally positive review and wrote, "AMC finds a bloody, fun and entertaining non-zombie counterpart to The Walking Dead and turns Sundays into an escapist red zone." Maureen Ryan of Variety wrote,

The action scenes scattered throughout Into the Badlands are not just stirringly presented, they represent a test passed with flying, and bloody, colors. This efficient AMC series is an homage to classic Samurai films and kinetic action fare churned out by Hong Kong maestros of furious fists, and if the TV drama had failed to meet the standards set by the sturdiest examples of those genres, it would have seemed superfluous at best. Fortunately, star Daniel Wu is more than up to the task of occupying the center of this streamlined story of vengeance, tyranny and roundhouse kicks.

=== Ratings ===
Into the Badlands : U.S. viewers per episode (millions)

Season	Episode number															
Season	1	2	3	4	5	6	7	8	9	10	11	12	13	14	15	16
1	6.39	4.83	5.17	2.42	2.21	2.16	–									
2	3.44	3.41	3.11	1.57	1.42	1.31	1.42	1.29	1.56	1.37	–					
3	1.35	1.27	0.97	1.20	1.08	0.92	1.06	0.89	1.25	0.59	0.61	0.41	0.40	0.65	0.50	0.46

Audience measurement performed by Nielsen Media Research

==== Season 1 ====
Viewership and ratings per episode of Into the Badlands
No.	Title	Air date	Rating (18–49)	Viewers (millions)	DVR (18–49)	DVR viewers (millions)	Total (18–49)	Total viewers (millions)
1	"The Fort"	November 15, 2015	3.2	6.39	0.8	1.83	4.0	8.22 (Note: Live +7 ratings were not available, so Live +3 ratings have been used instead.)
2	"Fist Like a Bullet"	November 22, 2015	2.3	4.83	—N/a	—N/a	—N/a	—N/a
3	"White Stork Spreads Wings"	November 29, 2015	2.5	5.17	0.7	1.52	3.2	6.69
4	"Two Tigers Subdue Dragons"	December 6, 2015	1.1	2.42	0.6	—N/a	1.7	—N/a
5	"Snake Creeps Down"	December 13, 2015	1.0	2.21	—N/a	—N/a	—N/a	—N/a
6	"Hand of Five Poisons"	December 20, 2015	1.0	2.16	—N/a	—N/a	—N/a	—N/a

==== Season 2 ====
Viewership and ratings per episode of Into the Badlands
No.	Title	Air date	Rating (18–49)	Viewers (millions)	DVR (18–49)	DVR viewers (millions)	Total (18–49)	Total viewers (millions)
1	"Tiger Pushes Mountain"	March 19, 2017	1.4	3.44	0.6	1.28	2.0	4.71
2	"Force of Eagle's Claw"	March 26, 2017	1.5	3.41	—N/a	1.23	—N/a	4.64
3	"Red Sun, Silver Moon"	April 2, 2017	1.4	3.11	0.6	1.38	2.0	4.50
4	"Palm of the Iron Fox"	April 9, 2017	0.6	1.57	0.5	1.12	1.1	2.69
5	"Monkey Leaps Through Mist"	April 16, 2017	0.5	1.42	0.6	1.25	1.1	2.67
6	"Leopard Stalks in Snow"	April 23, 2017	0.5	1.31	0.5	1.22	1.0	2.53
7	"Black Heart, White Mountain"	April 30, 2017	0.5	1.42	0.4	—N/a	0.9	—N/a
8	"Sting of the Scorpion's Tail"	May 7, 2017	0.5	1.29	—N/a	—N/a	—N/a	—N/a
9	"Nightingale Sings No More"	May 14, 2017	0.6	1.56	0.4	1.15	1.0	2.71
10	"Wolf's Breath, Dragon Fire"	May 21, 2017	0.5	1.37	0.4	1.07	0.9	2.44

==== Season 3 ====
Viewership and ratings per episode of Into the Badlands
No.	Title	Air date	Rating (18–49)	Viewers (millions)	DVR (18–49)	DVR viewers (millions)	Total (18–49)	Total viewers (millions)
1	"Enter the Phoenix"	April 22, 2018	0.5	1.35	—N/a	—N/a	—N/a	—N/a
2	"Moon Rises, Raven Seeks"	April 29, 2018	0.4	1.27	0.3	—N/a	0.7	—N/a
3	"Leopard Snares Rabbit"	May 6, 2018	0.3	0.97	—N/a	—N/a	—N/a	—N/a
4	"Blind Cannibal Assassins"	May 13, 2018	0.4	1.20	0.3	0.82	0.7	2.02
5	"Carry Tiger to Mountain"	May 20, 2018	0.4	1.08	—N/a	—N/a	—N/a	—N/a
6	"Black Wind Howls"	June 3, 2018	0.3	0.92	—N/a	—N/a	—N/a	—N/a
7	"Dragonfly's Last Dance"	June 10, 2018	0.3	1.06	0.4	0.87	0.7	1.93
8	"Leopard Catches Cloud"	June 17, 2018	0.3	0.89	—N/a	—N/a	—N/a	—N/a
9	"Chamber of the Scorpion"	March 24, 2019	0.4	1.25	0.3	0.75	0.7	2.00
10	"Raven's Feather, Phoenix Blood"	March 25, 2019	0.2	0.59	0.2	0.72	0.4	1.31
11	"The Boar and the Butterfly"	April 1, 2019	0.2	0.61	0.2	0.71	0.4	1.32
12	"Cobra Fang, Panther Claw"	April 8, 2019	0.1	0.41	0.3	0.64	0.4	1.05
13	"Black Lotus, White Rose"	April 15, 2019	0.1	0.40	0.3	0.82	0.4	1.22
14	"Curse of the Red Rain"	April 22, 2019	0.2	0.65	0.2	0.61	0.4	1.26
15	"Requiem for the Fallen"	April 29, 2019	0.2	0.50	0.2	0.70	0.4	1.20
16	"Seven Strike as One"	May 6, 2019	0.1	0.46	0.3	0.65	0.4	1.11

=== Accolades ===
Year	Award	Category	Recipient(s)	Result	Ref.
2018	Saturn Awards	Best Action-Thriller Television Series	Into the Badlands	Nominated	
