= List of historic places in New Westminster =

The following list includes all of the Canadian Register of Historic Places listings in New Westminster, British Columbia.

Name	Address	Coordinates	Government recognition (CRHP №)	Wikidata ID	Image
1006 Nanaimo Street	1006 Nanaimo Street; New Westminster BC	49°12′35″N 122°55′41″W	New Westminster municipality (16770)		Upload Photo
1012 Seventh Avenue	1012 Seventh Avenue; New Westminster BC	49°12′37″N 122°55′44″W	New Westminster municipality (16769)		Upload Photo
1013 Sixth Avenue	1013 Sixth Avenue; New Westminster BC	49°12′33″N 122°55′41″W	New Westminster municipality (16768)		Upload Photo
1021 Hamilton Street	1021 Hamilton Street; New Westminster BC	49°12′40″N 122°55′52″W	New Westminster municipality (16767)		Upload Photo
1032 Nanaimo Street	1032 Nanaimo Street; New Westminster BC	49°12′33″N 122°55′44″W	New Westminster municipality (16764)		Upload Photo
1101 Hamilton Street	1101 Hamilton Street; New Westminster BC	49°12′39″N 122°55′55″W	New Westminster municipality (16763)		Upload Photo
1321 Nanaimo Street	1321 Nanaimo Street; New Westminster BC	49°12′25″N 122°56′02″W	New Westminster municipality (16780)		Upload Photo
1405 Nanaimo Street	1405 Nanaimo Street; New Westminster BC	49°12′24″N 122°56′06″W	New Westminster municipality (16775)		Upload Photo
1513 Nanaimo Street	1513 Nanaimo Street; New Westminster BC	49°12′19″N 122°56′13″W	New Westminster municipality (16777)		Upload Photo
1717 Sixth Avenue	1717 Sixth Avenue; New Westminster BC	49°12′10″N 122°56′24″W	New Westminster municipality (16778)		Upload Photo
2033 Marine Way	2033 Marine Way; New Westminster BC	49°12′00″N 122°56′49″W	New Westminster municipality (16624)		Upload Photo
211 Seventh Avenue	211 Seventh Avenue; New Westminster BC	49°13′03″N 122°55′01″W	New Westminster municipality (16649)		Upload Photo
221 Princess Street	221 Princess Street; New Westminster BC	49°13′00″N 122°54′58″W	New Westminster municipality (16644)		Upload Photo
311 Seventh Avenue	311 Seventh Avenue; New Westminster BC	49°12′59″N 122°55′08″W	New Westminster municipality (16650)		Upload Photo
315 Princess Street	315 Princess Street; New Westminster BC	49°12′57″N 122°55′05″W	New Westminster municipality (16646)		Upload Photo
315 Sixth Avenue	315 Sixth Avenue; New Westminster BC	49°12′54″N 122°55′01″W	New Westminster municipality (16642)		Upload Photo
319 Sixth Avenue	319 Sixth Avenue; New Westminster BC	49°12′54″N 122°55′05″W	New Westminster municipality (16647)		Upload Photo
403 Seventh Avenue	403 Seventh Avenue; New Westminster BC	49°12′58″N 122°55′12″W	New Westminster municipality (16651)		Upload Photo
515 St. George Street	515 St. George Street; New Westminster BC	49°12′31″N 122°54′47″W	New Westminster municipality (16709)		Upload Photo
731 Fourth Street	731 Fourth Street; New Westminster BC	49°13′02″N 122°55′16″W	New Westminster municipality (16643)		Upload Photo
836 Thirteenth Street	836 Thirteenth Street; New Westminster BC	49°12′39″N 122°56′17″W	New Westminster municipality (16773)		More images
936 Thirteenth Street	936 Thirteenth Street; New Westminster BC	49°12′44″N 122°56′24″W	New Westminster municipality (16774)		Upload Photo
Adams Block	705 Columbia Street; New Westminster BC	49°12′08″N 122°54′36″W	New Westminster municipality (3515)		Upload Photo
Alan & Edith Webster Residence	827 Sixteenth Street; New Westminster BC	49°12′30″N 122°56′31″W	New Westminster municipality (16600)		Upload Photo
Alfred & Beatrice Parsons Residence	120 Sixth Avenue; New Westminster BC	49°13′00″N 122°54′47″W	New Westminster municipality (16601)		Upload Photo
Alfred H. Soloman Residence	218 Burr Street; New Westminster BC	49°12′19″N 122°55′05″W	New Westminster municipality (16564)		Upload Photo
Angus Campbell House	301 Princess Street; New Westminster BC	49°12′58″N 122°55′01″W	New Westminster municipality (16645)		Upload Photo
Armitage House	340 Fifth Street; New Westminster BC	49°12′38″N 122°54′58″W	New Westminster municipality (16617)		Upload Photo
Armoury	6th Street at Queen; New Westminster BC	49°12′25″N 122°54′46″W	Federal (3615)		
Armstrong Block	671 Columbia Street; New Westminster BC	49°12′08″N 122°54′36″W	New Westminster municipality (3514)		Upload Photo
Arthur & Charlotte Green Residence	335 Pine Street; New Westminster BC	49°12′43″N 122°54′47″W	New Westminster municipality (16595)		Upload Photo
Arthur and Ethel Hamilton House	1025 Eighth Avenue; New Westminster BC	49°12′42″N 122°55′55″W	New Westminster municipality (16766)		More images
Arundel Mansions	42 Begbie Street; New Westminster BC	49°12′08″N 122°54′40″W	New Westminster municipality (3533)		More images
Benjamin S. MacDonald House	526 Second Street; New Westrminster BC	49°12′58″N 122°54′50″W	New Westrminster municipality (16711)		Upload Photo
Bilodeau House	219 Carnarvon Street; New Westminster BC	49°12′25″N 122°54′14″W	New Westminster municipality (3493)		Upload Photo
British Columbia Electric Railway Company	774 Columbia Street; New Westminster BC	49°12′03″N 122°54′40″W	New Westminster municipality (3498)	Q62663548	More images
Bryson Block	710 Columbia Street; New Westminster BC	49°12′08″N 122°54′36″W	New Westminster municipality (3420)		Upload Photo
Bunachie	238 First Street; New Westminster BC	49°12′46″N 122°54′25″W	New Westminster municipality (16571)		Upload Photo
Burr Block	411 Columbia Street; New Westminster BC	49°12′17″N 122°54′22″W	New Westminster municipality (3503)		More images
Calbick House	218 Fourth Street; New Westminster BC	49°12′32″N 122°54′40″W	New Westminster municipality (16618)		Upload Photo
Canadian Bank of Commerce	544 Columbia Street; New Westminster BC	49°12′12″N 122°54′25″W	New Westminster municipality (3506)		More images
Canadian Pacific Railway Station	800 Columbia Street; New Westminster BC	49°12′03″N 122°54′42″W	New Westminster municipality (3499)		Upload Photo
Carlton Court	317 Third Avenue; New Westminster BC	49°12′38″N 122°54′43″W	New Westminster municipality (16707)		
Carnarvon Building	711 Carnarvon Street; New Westminster BC	49°12′12″N 122°54′40″W	New Westminster municipality (3411)		Upload Photo
Catherine Armstrong House	63 Merivale Street; New Westminster BC	49°12′25″N 122°54′18″W	New Westminster municipality (3551)		More images
Century House	620 Eighth Street; New Westminster BC	49°12′42″N 122°55′34″W	New Westminster municipality (16771)		Upload Photo
Charles & Wilhelmina Bergland Residence	227 Eleventh Street; New Westminster BC	49°12′13″N 122°55′23″W	New Westminster municipality (16570)		Upload Photo
Charles Murray Residence	403 St. George Street; New Westminster BC	49°12′33″N 122°54′43″W	New Westminster municipality (16602)		Upload Photo
Cliff Building	28 Sixth Street; New Westminster BC	49°12′12″N 122°54′32″W	New Westminster municipality (3642)		Upload Photo
Columbia Theatre	530 Columbia Street; New Westminster BC	49°12′12″N 122°54′25″W	New Westminster municipality (3505)		More images
Commercial Hotel	716 Columbia Street; New Westminster BC	49°12′07″N 122°54′37″W	New Westminster municipality (3517)		Upload Photo
Connaught Heights Park	2138 Ninth Avenue; New Westminster BC	49°12′12″N 122°57′18″W	New Westminster municipality (16625)		Upload Photo
Coulthard-Sutherland Block	607 Columbia Street; New Westminster BC	49°12′11″N 122°54′29″W	New Westminster municipality (3509)		Upload Photo
Crake House	230 Third Avenue; New Westminster BC	49°12′40″N 122°54′36″W	New Westminster municipality (16708)		Upload Photo
Cunningham Block	612 Columbia Street; New Westminster BC	49°12′10″N 122°54′29″W	New Westminster municipality (3520)		Upload Photo
Curtis-Armstrong Block	659 Columbia Street; New Westminster BC	49°12′09″N 122°54′32″W	New Westminster municipality (3414)		Upload Photo
David McLaughlin House	1031 Sixth Avenue; New Westminster BC	49°12′32″N 122°55′44″W	New Westminster municipality (16765)		Upload Photo
Davidson Residence	218 Queens Avenue; New Westminster BC	49°12′34″N 122°54′25″W	New Westminster municipality (16596)		Upload Photo
Deane Block	441 Columbia Street; New Westminster BC	49°12′15″N 122°54′25″W	New Westminster municipality (3504)		Upload Photo
Digby House	826 Royal Avenue; New Westminster BC	49°12′09″N 122°54′58″W	New Westminster municipality (3576)		Upload Photo
Dixon House	1014 Cornwall Street; New Westminster BC	49°12′20″N 122°55′23″W	New Westminster municipality (16565)		Upload Photo
Dominion Trust Block	600 Columbia Street; New Westminster BC	49°12′10″N 122°54′29″W	New Westminster municipality (3519)		More images
Douglas House	913 Tenth Street; New Westminster BC	49°12′53″N 122°55′59″W	New Westminster municipality (16607)		
Douglas House #2	915 Tenth Street; New Westminster BC	49°12′53″N 122°55′59″W	New Westminster municipality (16608)		More images
Dupont Block	642 Columbia Street; New Westminster BC	49°12′09″N 122°54′32″W	New Westminster municipality (3511)		Upload Photo
E-Dee-Nie	315 Fourth Avenue; New Westminster BC	49°12′44″N 122°54′50″W	New Westminster municipality (16574)		Upload Photo
Ellard Block	601 Columbia Street; New Westminster BC	49°12′12″N 122°54′29″W	New Westminster municipality (3508)		More images
Ellen Rogers Residence	107 Park Row; New Westminster BC	49°12′39″N 122°54′18″W	New Westminster municipality (16594)		Upload Photo
Ellis Block, Columbia Street	548 Columbia Street; New Westminster BC	49°12′11″N 122°54′25″W	New Westminster municipality (3507)		More images
Ellis Block, Front Street	553 Front Street; New Westminster BC	49°12′10″N 122°54′25″W	New Westminster municipality (3582)		Upload Photo
English Corners	119 Royal Avenue; New Westminster BC	49°12′35″N 122°54′14″W	New Westminster municipality (6375)		Upload Photo
Federal Building and Post Office	549 Columbia Street; New Westminster BC	49°12′13″N 122°54′29″W	New Westminster municipality (3415)		More images
Fifth Street	Fifth Street between Third and Tenth Avenues; New Westminster BC	49°12′55″N 122°55′15″W	New Westminster municipality (16716)		Upload Photo
Fourth Street Brick Road	Fourth Street; New Westminster BC	49°12′27″N 122°54′32″W	New Westminster municipality (16717)		Upload Photo
Frank & Leah Purvis Residence	417 Fourth Street; New Westminster BC	49°12′45″N 122°54′54″W	New Westminster municipality (16575)		Upload Photo
Furness Residence	340 Tenth Street; New Westminster BC	49°12′23″N 122°55′23″W	New Westminster municipality (16605)		Upload Photo
Galbraith House	131 Eighth Street; New Westminster BC	49°12′19″N 122°54′58″W	New Westminster municipality (6373)		Upload Photo
Gillanders Residence	902 Third Avenue; New Westminster BC	49°12′20″N 122°55′12″W	New Westminster municipality (16610)		Upload Photo
Gilley Residence	725 Queen's Avenue; New Westminster BC	49°12′21″N 122°54′58″W	New Westminster municipality (6374)		Upload Photo
Goodfellow House	215 Fifth Avenue; New Westminster BC	49°12′54″N 122°54′47″W	New Westminster municipality (16572)		Upload Photo
Grimston Park	1900 Seventh Avenue; New Westminster BC	49°12′06″N 122°56′38″W	New Westminster municipality (16779)		Upload Photo
Guichon Block	401 Columbia Street; New Westminster BC	49°12′17″N 122°54′22″W	New Westminster municipality (3502)		More images
H.D. Morgan Residence	1016 Cornwall Street; New Westminster BC	49°12′19″N 122°55′23″W	New Westminster municipality (16567)		Upload Photo
Hainsworth Residence	729 Queens Avenue; New Westminster BC	49°12′20″N 122°54′58″W	New Westminster municipality (16598)		Upload Photo
Hamley Block	622 Columbia Street; New Westminster BC	49°12′09″N 122°54′29″W	New Westminster municipality (3510)		Upload Photo
Hennessey Residence	626 Tenth Street; New Westminster BC	49°12′37″N 122°55′41″W	New Westminster municipality (16606)		Upload Photo
Henry and Marion Hoy House	202 Third Avenue; New Westminster BC	49°12′42″N 122°54′32″W	New Westminster municipality (16609)		Upload Photo
Holbrook Block	660 Columbia Street; New Westminster BC	49°12′08″N 122°54′32″W	New Westminster municipality (3512)		More images
Holy Trinity Cathedral	514 Carnarvon Street; New Westminster BC	49°12′16″N 122°54′25″W	New Westminster municipality (3539)		More images
Howay Cottage	500 Fourth Avenue; New Westminster BC	49°12′38″N 122°54′58″W	New Westminster municipality (16616)		Upload Photo
Humphrey Jones Residence	1016 Nanaimo Street; New Westminster BC	49°12′35″N 122°55′41″W	New Westminster municipality (16580)		Upload Photo
Irving House	302 Royal Avenue; New Westminster BC	49°12′28″N 122°54′22″W	New Westminster municipality (3416)		Upload Photo
Isabella McPherson Residence	513 St. George Street; New Westminster BC	49°12′31″N 122°54′47″W	New Westminster municipality (16603)		Upload Photo
James & Elizabeth Phillips Residence #1	321 Queens Avenue; New Westminster BC	49°12′32″N 122°54′36″W	New Westminster municipality (16787)		Upload Photo
James & Elizabeth Phillips Residence #2	323 Queens Avenue; New Westminster BC	49°12′32″N 122°54′36″W	New Westminster municipality (16788)		Upload Photo
James & Margaret Whitelaw House	1401 Edinburgh Street; New Westminster BC	49°12′35″N 122°56′20″W	New Westminster municipality (16566)		More images
James A. Taylor House	314 Third Street; New Westminster BC	49°12′41″N 122°54′43″W	New Westminster municipality (16611)		Upload Photo
James B. Whitburn Residence	217 Fourth Avenue; New Westminster BC	49°12′48″N 122°54′43″W	New Westminster municipality (16573)		Upload Photo
John & Annie Chamberlain Residence	914 Thirteenth Street; New Westminster BC	49°12′41″N 122°56′17″W	New Westminster municipality (16613)		More images
John A. McGuffin Residence	822 Kennedy Street; New Westminster BC	49°12′24″N 122°55′16″W	New Westminster municipality (16577)		Upload Photo
Land Registry Office	648 Carnarvon Street; New Westminster BC	49°12′10″N 122°54′36″W	New Westminster municipality (3541)		Upload Photo
Malins Block	535 Front Street; New Westminster BC	49°12′11″N 122°54′25″W	New Westminster municipality (3580)		Upload Photo
Maria Keary Cottage	305 Carnarvon Street; New Westminster BC	49°12′24″N 122°54′18″W	New Westminster municipality (3535)		Upload Photo
Masonic Block	701 Columbia Street; New Westminster BC	49°12′08″N 122°54′36″W	New Westminster municipality (3419)		More images
Matthias Residence	320 Eighth Avenue; New Westminster BC	49°13′03″N 122°55′16″W	New Westminster municipality (16569)		Upload Photo
McClughan Residence	219 Ninth Street; New Westminster BC	49°12′18″N 122°55′08″W	New Westminster municipality (16582)		Upload Photo
McLennan, McFeely and Prior Building	811 Columbia Street; New Westminster BC	49°12′03″N 122°54′47″W	New Westminster municipality (3501)		Upload Photo
McLeod Block	50 Sixth Street; New Westminster BC	49°12′14″N 122°54′32″W	New Westminster municipality (16803)		Upload Photo
McNeely House	807 Milton Street; New Westminster BC	49°12′20″N 122°55′05″W	New Westminster municipality (16578)		Upload Photo
Moir Residence	1010 Third Avenue; New Westminster BC	49°12′18″N 122°55′18″W	New Westminster municipality (16615)		Upload Photo
Moody Park	Sixth Avenue; New Westminster BC	49°12′42″N 122°55′37″W	New Westminster municipality (16762)		More images
New St. Andrew's Presbyterian Church	321 Carnarvon Street; New Westminster BC	49°12′22″N 122°54′22″W	New Westminster municipality (3538)		Upload Photo
New Westminster City Hall	511 Royal Avenue; New Westminster BC	49°12′26″N 122°54′36″W	New Westminster municipality (16713)		More images
New Westminster Courthouse	632 Carnarvon Street; New Westminster BC	49°12′13″N 122°54′36″W	New Westminster municipality (3540)		More images
New Westminster Masonic Hall	508 Agnes Street; New Westminster BC	49°12′18″N 122°54′32″W	New Westminster municipality (3492)		Upload Photo
Newton Residence	416 Oak Street; New Westminster BC	49°12′45″N 122°54′54″W	New Westminster municipality (16593)		Upload Photo
Nidaros Lutheran Church	47 Merivale Street; New Westminster BC	49°12′22″N 122°54′14″W	New Westminster municipality (3534)		More images
Odd Fellows Block	55 Eighth Street; New Westminster BC	49°12′08″N 122°54′47″W	New Westminster municipality (3518)		Upload Photo
Old St. Andrew's Presbyterian Church	317 Carnarvon Street; New Westminster BC	49°12′22″N 122°54′22″W	New Westminster municipality (3537)		Upload Photo
Osterman House	1422 London Street; New Westminster BC	49°12′37″N 122°56′28″W	New Westminster municipality (16715)		Upload Photo
Paramount Theatre	652 Columbia Street; New Westminster BC	49°12′09″N 122°54′32″W	New Westminster municipality (3413)		More images
Queen's Park	51 Third Avenue; New Westminster BC	49°12′55″N 122°54′22″W	New Westminster municipality (16704)		Upload Photo
Queen's Park Arenex	51 Third Avenue; New Westminster BC	49°12′54″N 122°54′22″W	New Westminster municipality (16712)		Upload Photo
Robert and Flossy Menten Residence	231 Queens Avenue; New Westminster BC	49°12′35″N 122°54′32″W	New Westminster municipality (16597)		Upload Photo
Robert and Mary Cheyne Residence	435 Third Street; New Westminster BC	49°12′50″N 122°54′50″W	New Westminster municipality (16612)		Upload Photo
Royal City Christian Centre	601 Eighth Avenue; New Westminster BC	49°12′58″N 122°55′30″W	New Westminster municipality (16786)		Upload Photo
Sidney & Ida Pearce Residence	815 Milton Street; New Westminster BC	49°12′19″N 122°55′05″W	New Westminster municipality (16579)		Upload Photo
Sinclair Park	114 Sinclair Avenue; New Westminster BC	49°13′17″N 122°55′05″W	New Westminster municipality (16652)		Upload Photo
Sivewright Residence	313 Warren Avenue; New Westminster BC	49°12′36″N 122°54′40″W	New Westminster municipality (16614)		Upload Photo
Sixth Avenue United Church	1105 Sixth Avenue; New Westminster BC	49°12′30″N 122°55′48″W	New Westminster municipality (16801)		Upload Photo
Spring House	1420 Seventh Avenue; New Westminster BC	49°12′23″N 122°56′10″W	New Westminster municipality (16776)		Upload Photo
St. Paul's Reformed Episcopal Church	628 Royal Avenue; New Westminster BC	49°12′18″N 122°54′43″W	New Westminster municipality (3417)		Upload Photo
St. Peter's Roman Catholic Church	330 Royal Avenue; New Westminster BC	49°12′24″N 122°54′29″W	New Westminster municipality (3578)		Upload Photo
Sullivan Park	315 Oliver Street; New Westminster BC	49°12′43″N 122°54′36″W	New Westminster municipality (16714)		Upload Photo
T. Eaton and Company Store	502 Columbia Street; New Westminster BC	49°12′13″N 122°54′25″W	New Westminster municipality (3412)		More images
Telford Block	845 Royal Avenue; New Westminster BC	49°12′09″N 122°55′01″W	New Westminster municipality (16623)		Upload Photo
Terry Hughes Park	Park Crescent; New Westminster BC	49°13′17″N 122°54′43″W	New Westminster municipality (16653)		Upload Photo
Thomas & Mary Hood Residence	1016 Seventh Avenue; New Westminster BC	49°12′37″N 122°55′44″W	New Westminster municipality (16599)		Upload Photo
Thomas and Alice Morgan House	411 Fourth Street; New Westminster BC	49°12′44″N 122°54′50″W	New Westminster municipality (16710)		Upload Photo
Thomas and Elizabeth Turnbull House	217 Ninth Street; New Westminster BC	49°12′18″N 122°55′08″W	New Westminster municipality (16581)		Upload Photo
Tipperary Park	301 Royal Avenue; New Westminster BC	49°12′30″N 122°54′32″W	New Westminster municipality (16703)		Upload Photo
Trapp Block	668 Columbia Street; New Westminster BC	49°12′08″N 122°54′32″W	New Westminster municipality (1506)		More images
Turnbull House	221 Ninth Street; New Westminster BC	49°12′18″N 122°55′08″W	New Westminster municipality (16583)		Upload Photo
W.H. Falding Residence	431 Fourth Street; New Westminster BC	49°12′46″N 122°54′54″W	New Westminster municipality (16576)		Upload Photo
Wadsworth House	1010 Third Avenue; New Westminster BC	49°12′49″N 122°54′45″W	New Westminster municipality (19945)		Upload Photo
Westham	121 St. Patrick Street; New Westminster BC	49°12′54″N 122°54′40″W	New Westminster municipality (16604)		Upload Photo
Westminster Trust Building	709 Columbia Street; New Westminster BC	49°12′07″N 122°54′40″W	New Westminster municipality (3516)		More images
William & Elizabeth Plows Residence	1110 Dublin Street; New Westminster BC	49°12′45″N 122°56′06″W	New Westminster municipality (16568)		More images
William Clarkson House No. 1	313 Fourth Street; New Westminster BC	49°12′38″N 122°54′43″W	New Westminster municipality (16705)		Upload Photo
William Clarkson House No. 2	314 Pine Street; New Westminster BC	49°12′39″N 122°54′43″W	New Westminster municipality (16706)		Upload Photo
William W. Forrester House	417 Sixth Avenue; New Westminster BC	49°12′51″N 122°55′08″W	New Westminster municipality (16648)		Upload Photo
Windsor Hotel	738 Columbia Street; New Westminster BC	49°12′05″N 122°54′36″W	New Westminster municipality (3497)		Upload Photo
Wintemute House	111 Fifth Avenue; New Westminster BC	49°12′57″N 122°54′40″W	New Westminster municipality (6372)		Upload Photo
Young Block	665 Columbia Street; New Westminster BC	49°09′35″N 123°56′10″W	New Westminster municipality (3513)		Upload Photo
