= Dark Justice =

American crime drama series

- Genre: Crime drama
- Created by: Jeff Freilich
- Starring: Ramy Zada; Bruce Abbott; Janet Gunn; Dick O'Neill; Clayton Prince
- Music by: Mark Snow
- Country of origin: United States
- Original language: English
- No. of seasons: 3
- No. of episodes: 66 (list of episodes)

Production
- Executive producer: Jeff Freilich
- Producers: David Calloway; Rift Fournier
- Running time: 45–48 minutes
- Production companies: David Salzman Entertainment; Institut del Cinema Català (ICC) (season 1); Televisió de Catalunya (TV3) (season 1); Lorimar Television

Original release
- Network: CBS
- Release: April 5, 1991 – September 28, 1993

Dark Justice is an American crime drama television series about a judge who becomes a vigilante by night so that he can bring high-level offenders whose cases he had to dismiss due to technicalities to what he calls "dark justice". The role of Judge Nicholas Marshall was played by actors Ramy Zada (1991) and Bruce Abbott (1992–1993).

The series began airing on April 5, 1991, and ran for three seasons (66 episodes) finishing on September 28, 1993.

== Production and filming ==
During the first season, the series was shot in Barcelona, Catalunya, Spain. Before the second season, the series had to switch locations due to budget constraints caused by the 1992 Summer Olympics. The second and third seasons were shot in Los Angeles, California.

Actor Ramy Zada, who played the lead role of Judge Nicholas Marshall during the first season, was said to be unavailable for the second season due to the location change, and Bruce Abbott was chosen as his replacement. The location was also the main reason behind the casting of some Spanish actors, like Begoña Plaza, in lead roles. When the series shifted to Los Angeles, Janet Gunn permanently assumed the role of the female member of "The Night Watchmen", Kelly Cochrane.

Gunn later starred for three seasons as Cassandra St. John in Silk Stalkings, another Crimetime After Primetime drama, after it had moved exclusively to the USA Network.

== Plot synopsis ==
Nicholas Marshall, a former police officer and district attorney, is a judge who loses his faith in the legal system after his wife and daughter are murdered in a car bombing intended for him. After the killer walks free due to a technicality, Marshall becomes a vigilante by night, dedicated to bringing what he calls "dark justice" to criminals who evade penalties due to technicalities. Marshall had already had his faith in the legal system shaken even before his wife and his daughter were murdered: as a youth, growing up in an unnamed ghetto in an unspecified city, his father was murdered by a hoodlum with local connections; as a police officer, technicalities often voided his arrests; as a prosecutor, having obtained his law degree through night school studies, crooked defenders would sometimes undermine his prosecutions; and after his election to a judgeship, the letter of the law often bound his hands.

To help him achieve his goal, Marshall uses a team of specialists whom the local press refers to as "The Night Watchmen". The team, a civilian counterpart to the mission teams of the governmental Impossible Missions Force, consists of people who were prosecuted for lower-level offenses, and who help him with some tasks; this can be seen as a form of community service for their offenses. The members of the watchmen were Arnold "Moon" Willis (Dick O'Neill), who had once been a con man; Jericho "Gibs" Gibson (Clayton Prince), a special effects expert; and a female companion that changed several times during the three seasons. Kelly Cochrane (Janet Gunn) was a rape victim whose attackers had been acquitted in Marshall's court. After she killed one of her attackers, Marshall added her to the team; she remained until the end of the series.

Marshall would typically target criminals whom he had encountered in his courtroom, but whom he was forced to release for technical reasons of one kind or another. Marshall would generally dismiss these defendants with the warning, "Justice may be blind, but it can see in the dark." He would then assume his alter ego as a long-haired, leather jacket-wearing, motorcycle-riding vigilante. His team would construct an elaborate sting operation, usually involving undercover work and even special effects. These operations were designed to elicit a confession from the criminal or otherwise trip them up so that courtroom-admissible (and/or technicality-resistant) evidence either of the original crime or of a different crime could be gathered.

Unfortunately for the Night Watchmen, the very police department in which Marshall himself had once served came to view them as criminals, and their crusade as illegal. By the time of the series conclusion, even the FBI had commenced to look into the activities of the Night Watchmen, a probe Marshall was, presumably, able to defuse when a federal agent provided him with the FBI file on the Night Watchmen.

== Cast ==
- Ramy Zada as Judge Nicholas Marshall (1991)
- Bruce Abbott as Judge Nicholas Marshall (1992–1993)
- Janet Gunn as Kelly Cochrane (1992–1993)
- Dick O'Neill as Arnold "Moon" Willis (1991–1993)
- Clayton Prince as Jericho "Gibs" Gibson (1991–1993)
- Begoña Plaza as Catalana "Cat" Duran (1991)
- Viviane Vives as Maria Marti (1991)
- Kit Kincannon as District Attorney Ken Horton (1991–93)
- Carrie-Anne Moss as Tara McDonald (1991–1993)
- Elisa Heinsohn as Samantha "Sam" Collins (1993)

== Episode list ==
=== Season 1: 1991–92 ===
No. overall	No. in season	Title	Directed by	Written by	Original release date
1	1	"Nowhere to Hide"	Jeff Freilich	Jeff Freilich	April 5, 1991
The newly christened Night Watchmen attempt to bring down a yuppie hit man.
2	2	"What Comes Around"	David Calloway	Duke Sandfer	April 12, 1991
A drug dealer kills an old friend of Nick's so the team sets up a fake drug bust to catch him.
3	3	"Out of Mind, Out of Sight"	Tim Hunter	James Cappe	April 19, 1991
A murderous architect who loves mystery novels thinks he's an old style gumshoe.
4	4	"To Die For"	David Calloway	Gordon Mitchell	April 26, 1991
A black widow kills rich older men to inherit their money.
5	5	"In Mysterious Ways"	Ken Wiederhorn	Terry Black	May 3, 1991
A crooked televangelist finds the true faith, with help from the Night Watchmen.
6	6	"The Carnival"	John Nicolella	Michael De Luca & Alan J. Scott	May 10, 1991
Neo-Nazis with a hidden agenda target Jewish storefronts.
7	7	"Brother Mine"	Jeff Freilich	Chris Bunch & Allan Cole	May 17, 1991
The Night Watchmen chase the Sicani brothers to Spain to catch them in an illegal arms deal.
8	8	"Broken Toys"	Ken Widerhorn	E Nick Alexander	May 24, 1991
A mob backed pimp goes rogue and hunts a teenage girl who can prove his crimes.
9	9	"I Hate Mondays"	Tom DeSimone	Michael De Luca & Alan J. Scott	May 31, 1991
Nick's courtroom is taken hostage, but not all is as it seems.
10	10	"Simon Says"	John Lafia	Story by : John Carlen; Teleplay by : John Carlen & James Cappe	June 7, 1991
The inmates run the asylum at Seegoville, one in particular.
11	11	"Urban Renewal"	Tom DeSimone	Michael De Luca & Alan J. Scott	September 13, 1991
The boys home founded by a philanthropic stockbroker is a front for an extreme fighting club.
12	12	"Once Upon a Time in Krestridge"	Luis Valdivieso	James Cappe	September 20, 1991
One man rules a small town with an iron grip.
13	13	"Forbes for the Defense"	Luis Valdivieso	Rebecca J. Pogrow	September 27, 1991
A new public defender is exacting her own brand of vengeance.
14	14	"Marshall Law"	David Calloway	Jeff Freilich & Michael De Luca	October 4, 1991
After a being shot, Nick must pass judgement on his most difficult difficult case yet: himself.
15	15	"Fruit of the Poisonous Tree"	Tom DeSimone	Rift Fournier & Michael De Luca	October 18, 1991
Rich siblings murder their parents for their inheritance.
16	16	"Smokescreen"	David Calloway	Tony Kayden	October 25, 1991
17	17	"The Neutralizing Factor"	Ken Widerhorn	Susan Estabrook	November 1, 1991
A chemical plant is poisoning the local population.
18	18	"Playing the Odds"	John Lafia	James Cappe	November 8, 1991
The Night Watchmen engage in a deadly game of chance with Tara's gambler boyfriend.
19	19	"Diplomatic Immunity"	Ken Widerhorn	Rift Fournier	November 15, 1991
A nuclear weapons deal is about to go down at the embassy of an apartheid state.
20	20	"Caught in the Act"	David Calloway	Story by : Jeff Freilich & James Cappe; Teleplay by : Rift Fournier	November 22, 1991
Gibs, Moon and Maria are arrested on a sting, and brought before Nick's court.
21	21	"Once Loved, Twice Dead"	Ramy Zada	Duke Sandefur	February 7, 1992
An old flame of Nick's is murdered by her boyfriend, or maybe not?
22	22	"Judgement Night"	Jeff Freilich	Christopher Trumbo & Jeff Freilich	February 28, 1992
The Night Watchmen return to Spain to clash again with Thomas Sicani.

=== Season 2: 1992–93 ===
No. overall	No. in season	Title	Directed by	Written by	Original release date
23	1	"Bump in the Night"	Jeff Freilich	Karen Clark	April 17, 1992
A private eye is raped by crooked cops and seeks justice and discovers the Night Watchmen.
24	2	"Anniversary"	Tom DeSimone	James Cappe	April 24, 1992
The secretary for a corporate raider and killer looks exactly like Nick's late wife.
25	3	"Prime Cuts"	Ken Wiederhorn	Alan J. Scott & Michael De Luca	May 1, 1992
A female surgeon extracts organs from unsuspecting people, to sell on the black market.
26	4	"Lead Rain"	Tom DeSimone	Duke Sandefur	May 8, 1992
27	5	"Lush Life"	David Calloway	Christopher Trumbo	May 15, 1992
28	6	"The Specialist"	Ken Wiederhorn	James Cappe	May 29, 1992
A sex therapist art-burglar grows bored of the thrills of robbery and advances to murder.
29	7	"Needy Things"	Tom DeSimone	Susan Estabrook	June 5, 1992
A gigolo helps the mob extort information and secrets from the wealthy.
30	8	"Snitch"	Ken Wiederhorn	Christopher Trumbo	June 12, 1992
31	9	"Instant Replay"	Ken Wiederhorn	Duke Sandefur	September 25, 1992
32	10	"The Highest Court"	Jeff Freilich	Terry Black	October 2, 1992
Nick and Kelly are on a flight to Australia when another passenger discovers the man who killed his son is also on board, leading to a hostage situation.
33	11	"Deadline"	Unknown	Christopher Trumbo	October 9, 1992
34	12	"A Better Mousetrap"	Unknown	Greg Strangis	October 16, 1992
35	13	"Happy Mother's Day"	Ken Wiederhorn	March Kessler	October 23, 1992
Nick has to hide the Night Watchmen from his visiting mother and her agenda.
36	14	"Black Heart"	Unknown	Michael De Luca & Alan J. Scott	October 30, 1992
37	15	"Jail Bait"	David Calloway	Karen Clark	November 6, 1992
38	16	"Venus Flytrap"	Unknown	Duke Sandefur	November 13, 1992
39	17	"Teenage Pajama Party Massacre: Part IV"	Unknown	Greg Strangis	November 20, 1992
The team is undercover on the B-movie Gibs is working on, trying to find a killer.
40	18	"Shrink"	David Calloway	Christopher Trumbo	November 27, 1992
41	19	"The Merchant"	James Cappe	James Cappe	February 5, 1993
42	20	"Blast from the Past"	Unknown	Story by : Jeff Freilich; Teleplay by : Karen Clark	February 12, 1993
43	21	"Cold Reading"	Unknown	Story by : Ken Wiederhorn; Teleplay by : Ken Wiederhorn & James Cappe	February 19, 1993
44	22	"Suitable for Framing"	Jeff Freilich	Story by : Jeff Freilich; Teleplay by : Duke Sandefur	February 26, 1993
Nick is accused of murder during his election campaign, in which District Attorney Ken Horton is his opponent. An old target of the NW resurfaces.

=== Season 3: 1993 ===
No. overall	No. in season	Title	Directed by	Written by	Original release date
45	1	"Joyride"	Jeff Freilich	Duke Sandefur	April 16, 1993
Nick and Kelly infiltrate a biker gang.
46	2	"Night Games"	Tom DeSimone	Greg Strangis	April 23, 1993
47	3	"Last Rites"	William Malone	James Cappe	April 30, 1993
48	4	"Person or Persons Unknown"	Tom DeSimone	Duke Sandefur	May 7, 1993
49	5	"Clean Kill"	Tim Hunter	Terry Black	May 14, 1993
50	6	"The Greening of Glenda Ross"	David Calloway	Christopher Trumbo	May 21, 1993
51	7	"Uncle Tony's Cabin"	Tom DeSimone	Susan Estabrook	May 28, 1993
52	8	"Pygmalion"	Reza Badiyi	Peter Dunne	June 4, 1993
53	9	"Backfire"	Tom DeSimone	Rift Fournier, Alan J. Scott & Michael De Luca	June 11, 1993
54	10	"Second Anniversary"	Tom DeSimone	James Cappe	June 18, 1993
55	11	"Squeeze Play"	William Malone	Howard Lakin	June 25, 1993
56	12	"Incorrect Dosage"	Reza Badiyi	Duke Sandefur	July 2, 1993
57	13	"2nd Story"	David Calloway	Greg Strangis	July 9, 1993
58	14	"Three on a Match"	Unknown	Unknown	July 16, 1993
59	15	"Crash Course"	Tom DeSimone	Greg Strangis	July 23, 1993
60	16	"The Push"	James Cappe	James Cappe	July 30, 1993
61	17	"My Dinner with Nick"	Unknown	Unknown	August 6, 1993
62	18	"In Cover of Darkness: Part 1"	Jeff Freilich	Duke Sandefur & Jeff Freilich	August 17, 1993
63	19	"In Cover of Darkness: Part 2"	Jeff Freilich	Duke Sandefur & Jeff Freilich	August 24, 1993
64	20	"The Doctor Is In"	William Malone	Merl Edelman	September 14, 1993
65	21	"A Kiss Goodbye"	David Calloway	Duke Sandefur	September 21, 1993
66	22	"A Novel Way to Die"	Unknown	Unknown	September 28, 1993
