= List of Silk Stalkings episodes =

The following is a list of episodes of Silk Stalkings.

== Series overview ==
Season	Episodes	Originally released		
Season	Episodes	First released	Last released	Network
1	20	November 7, 1991	May 14, 1992	CBS
2	24	September 17, 1992	June 10, 1993	CBS
3	22	September 26, 1993	March 27, 1994	USA Network
4	22	September 18, 1994	March 19, 1995	USA Network
5	22	September 17, 1995	March 3, 1996	USA Network
6	22	September 15, 1996	June 22, 1997	USA Network
7	22	August 3, 1997	April 19, 1998	USA Network
8	22	July 26, 1998	April 18, 1999	USA Network

== Episodes ==
=== Season 1 (1991–92) ===
No. overall	No. in season	Title	Directed by	Written by	Original release date
1	1	"Pilot"	Don Edmonds	Stephen J. Cannell	November 7, 1991
A model is killed in her apartment.
2	2	"Going to Babylon"	Worth Keeter	Stephen J. Cannell	November 14, 1991
A couple is luring unsuspecting couples to their dungeon for dangerous sexual activities. Rita gets a visit from an old enemy.
3	3	"S.O.B."	Ralph Hemecker	David Peckinpah	November 21, 1991
The two cops investigate a yacht called "S.O.B.", after a man winds up dead on the beach.
4	4	"In the Name of Love"	Alan Cassidy	Sam Glickson	November 28, 1991
A man is killed while delivering a ransom for his kidnapped daughter, but Chris and Rita discover that there isn't really a kidnapping. Chris tries to make a pasta dinner for his new girlfriend.
5	5	"Dirty Laundry"	Brian Trenchard-Smith	Stephen G. Geyer	December 12, 1991
A congressman is found naked and dead by the sea. Chris helps Rita overcome her insomnia.
6	6	"Men Seeking Women"	Ralph Hemecker	Todd Trotter	December 19, 1991
A serial killer finds his victims in the singles ads. Chris reunites with an old lady friend, who has become a stripper.
7	7	"Hardcopy"	P.D. Van Arsdol	Eric Estrin and Michael Berlin	January 9, 1992
A loathed publisher is found murdered.
8	8	"Curtain Call"	Brian Trenchard-Smith	Garner Simmons	January 16, 1992
A woman is found murdered in her pool.
9	9	"The Brotherhood"	Ralph Hemecker	Elliott Anderson	January 23, 1992
A young girl is found dead by the side of the road. The evidence shows that the girl was gang-raped.
10	10	"Blo-Dri"	Ralph Hemecker	Elliott Anderson	February 6, 1992
A mob lawyer and his hairdresser are shot in the barber shop.
11	11	"Intensive Care"	Kristine Peterson	Erica Byrne	February 27, 1992
A surgeon is killed with a scalpel.
12	12	"Squeeze Play"	Stuart J.D. Perry	Simon Ayer	March 5, 1992
A baseball player becomes the main suspect, when a real estate tycoon is killed with a baseball bat.
13	13	"Shock Jock"	Ron Garcia	David Abramowitz	March 12, 1992
A woman is shot to death in her shower.
14	14	"Witness"	Maria Lease	Todd Trotter	April 2, 1992
A man wants to see his wife in bed with another man, but becomes jealous and kills the man. While dumping the body, he's seen by a runaway. Chris becomes involved with a clothing designer.
15	15	"Domestic Agenda"	Perry Husman	Peter McCabe	April 9, 1992
A young nanny is found dead.
16	16	"Lady Luck"	Brian Trenchard-Smith	David Peckinpah	April 16, 1992
In exchange for immunity, a realtor helps Chris and Rita set up a sting operation against an illegal casino, who lets their clients build up big debts, and then kill them because they can't pay.
17	17	"The Sock Drawer"	Eric Alexander Forbes	Stephen J. Cannell	April 23, 1992
Chris and Rita goes to a potential murder scene, when they arrive at the scene they are fired upon. The man shot at them was patrol commander John Stonewell. Chris and Rita must now face a shooting review board.
18	18	"Internal Affairs"	David Schmoeller	Garner Simmons	April 30, 1992
Chris responds to a burglary in progress, and kills one of the delinquents trying to get away. The boy's mother seeks revenge on Chris.
19	19	"Working Girl"	Maria Lease	Todd Trotter	May 7, 1992
A call girl is killed, the only witness to the murder is another call girl.
20	20	"Powder Burn"	Ralph Hemecker	David Peckinpah	May 14, 1992
In order to stop a drug kingpin, Hutch goes undercover as a drug dealer. Rita's old flame shows up and wants to rekindle their old romance.

=== Season 2 (1992–93) ===
No. overall	No. in season	Title	Directed by	Written by	Original release date
21	1	"Baser Instincts"	Brian Trenchard-Smith	Garner Simmons	September 17, 1992
A movie set is threatened by right-wing extremists.
22	2	"Good Time Charlie"	Ralph Hemecker	David Tynan	September 24, 1992
A serial rapist Chris arrested is back.
23	3	"Social Call"	David Schmoeller	Jay Hugueley	October 29, 1992
Chris and Rita play wealthy newlyweds to nail a high society killer.
24	4	"Wild Card"	Maria Lease	Gordon T. Dawson	November 5, 1992
Chris and a bounty hunter compete to find a murder suspect.
25	5	"In Too Deep"	Linda Hassani	Todd Trotter	November 12, 1992
A vice cop is suspected of killing another cop.
26	6	"Bad Blood"	Terrence O'Hara	Robert Bielak	November 19, 1992
Two brothers are suspected of murdering their parents.
27	7	"Hot Rocks"	Maria Lease	David Kemper	November 26, 1992
Chris tries to catch a ring of jewel thieves.
28	8	"Scorpio Lover"	William Lucking	David Barry	December 3, 1992
A woman's lover kills her millionaire husband.
29	9	"Love-15"	David Schmoeller	David Kemper	December 10, 1992
The stepfather of a tennis star is murdered in the locker room.
30	10	"The Queen is Dead"	Linda Hassani	Brad Radnitz	December 17, 1992
After a night with the pageant director, a beauty queen is found strangled.
31	11	"Irreconcilable Differences"	Ralph Hemecker	Elizabeth Comici and Luciano Comici	January 7, 1993
A woman contesting her prenuptial agreement has fatal consequences.
32	12	"Jasmine"	Rob Estes	Marilyn Osborne	January 28, 1993
A murdered singer from the 1940s comes to Rita in a dream and calls for help.
33	13	"Crush"	Linda Hassani	David E. Peckinpah	February 4, 1993
A young Casanova pays after romancing a young woman and her stepmom.
34	14	"Was It Good for You Too?"	Ralph Hemecker	David E. Peckinpah	February 11, 1993
A woman calls in to a radio show to announce her plans to kill a man while having sex with him.
35	15	"Dead Weight"	Andrew Stevens	David Kemper	February 18, 1993
A businessman with both a wife and a lover is killed.
36	16	"Kid Stuff"	Terrence O'Hara	Jerry Patrick Brown	February 25, 1993
A hooker shoots the wife of the man she's in love with.
37	17	"Night Games"	Terrence O'Hara	Gordon T. Dawson	April 1, 1993
A woman plays a dangerous game with her husband, her lover and her husbands female secretary.
38	18	"Meat Market"	James Bagdonas	Gordon T. Dawson	April 22, 1993
A married couple lures young girls into sexual slavery with promises of modelling jobs.
39	19	"Giant Steps"	David Schmoeller	Roger Lowenstein	April 29, 1993
At a birthday party, a dead man falls down the stairs.
40	20	"Soul Kiss"	James Gibson	Gordon T. Dawson	May 6, 1993
A reporter gets killed after revealing that a couple breaks the law.
41	21	"Look the Other Way"	David Schmoeller	Doug Heyes Jr.	May 13, 1993
Chris gets shot after seeing a fight between a man and a woman.
42	22	"Star Signs"	R. Marvin	Jerry Patrick Brown	May 20, 1993
Both the assistant and the wife of a famous astrologer has an affair with a dangerous man.
43	23	"Voices"	Robert Primes	Janna King	May 27, 1993
A cop gets framed for the murder of a phone-sex hooker.
44	24	"Crime of Love"	Carl Weathers	Gordon T. Dawson	June 10, 1993
A gigolo is set free, seven years after Rita put him in prison.

=== Season 3 (1993–94) ===
No. overall	No. in season	Title	Directed by	Written by	Original release date
45	1	"Team Spirit"	Terrence O'Hara	Michael Zand & Terri Treas	September 26, 1993
Three friends have become the target of a killer.
46	2	"The Perfect Alibi"	Ron Garcia	Morgan Mendel	October 3, 1993
The killer of a video pirate appears to have committed the perfect murder.
47	3	"To Serve and Protect"	Terrence O'Hara	David E. Peckinpah	October 17, 1993
A mobster tries to silence a witness.
48	4	"Tough Love"	Andrew Stevens	Gordon T. Dawson	October 24, 1993
A New York mobster becomes the suspect when a woman on parole gets killed.
49	5	"Sex, Lies and Yellow Tape"	Tucker Gates	Lou Comici & Liz Comici	October 31, 1993
A politician becomes a suspect when a call girl gets killed.
50	6	"Schemes Like Old Times"	Lynn Hamrick	David Barry and Michael Zand	November 7, 1993
A physician gets murdered, and a con artist is the prime suspect. NOTE – Gilbert Gottfried, from USA Network's USA Up All Night, guest-stars as Billy
51	7	"Love Never Dies"	Ralph Hemecker	Robert Brennan	November 14, 1993
A model dies of an overdose, and Chris and Rita suspects her manager had something to do with it.
52	8	"Daddy Dearest"	Ron Ames	Darren Swimmer & Todd Slavkin	November 21, 1993
An abused step-daughter comes home to find the dead body of her step-father.
53	9	"Ladies Night Out"	Cliff Bole	Todd Trotter	December 5, 1993
Chris goes undercover as a dancer and Rita goes undercover as a lonely patron in a male strip club to investigate a prostitution ring.
54	10	"The Party's Over"	David Schmoeller	Robert Hammer	December 12, 1993
A young woman mistaken for Rita is murdered.
55	11	"Killer Cop"	James Darren	Maryanne Kosica & Michael Scheff	January 9, 1994
Chris and Rita chases a serial killer that could be a cop. NOTE – Rhonda Shear, from USA Network's USA Up All Night, guest-stars as Cindy Blaine.
56	12	"T.K.O."	Martin Kove	Steven Baum	January 16, 1994
Chris helps a boxer.
57	13	"Judas Kiss"	Tucker Gates	W. Reed Morgan	January 23, 1994
Chris and Rita tries to catch a Colombian drug dealer.
58	14	"Love Bandit"	Ron Ames	Bill Froelich	January 30, 1994
When the death of Rita's friend is ruled a suicide, she investigates.
59	15	"Whore Wars"	Terrence O'Hara	Jerry Patrick Brown	February 6, 1994
A war between rival brothels ensues.
60	16	"The Scarlet Shadow"	Tucker Gates	Doug Heyes Jr.	February 13, 1994
Rita is linked to the murder of a fellow officer.
61	17	"Head 'N' Tail"	Rob Estes	Gordon T. Dawson	February 20, 1994
Rita and Lipschitz goes undercover at a private school when a teenager is murdered.
62	18	"Freudian Slip"	Tucker Gates	Stephen G. Geyer	February 27, 1994
A friend of Chris is suspected of murdering his wife.
63	19	"The Last Campaign"	Scott Levitta	Morgan Gendel	March 6, 1994
The campaign manager of Donovan's rival is murdered.
64	20	"The Deep End"	John Blizek	Brad Radnitz	March 13, 1994
An adult magazine publisher is found dead.
65	21	"Mother Love"	Mitzi Kapture	Jerry Patrick Brown	March 20, 1994
The wife of a former cop comes up with a plot to get his money.
66	22	"Dark Heart"	Tucker Gates	Story by : David E. Peckinpah; Teleplay by : David E. Peckinpah & Jerry Patrick Brown	March 27, 1994
Donovan takes a bullet for Rita. Chris gets stalked by a secret admirer.

=== Season 4 (1994–95) ===
No. overall	No. in season	Title	Directed by	Written by	Original release date
67	1	"Natural Selection: Part 1"	James Darren	David E. Peckinpah	September 18, 1994
After being shot, Chris struggles to recover. Rita tries to catch a killer who prey on rich women.
68	2	"Natural Selection: Part 2"	Peter Ellis	Michael Zand and Terri Treas	September 19, 1994
Chris has disappeared. Rita hunts a killer.
69	3	"Reluctant Witness"	Peter McCabe	Terrence O'Hara	September 26, 1994
Chris and Rita has to babysit the only witness in a mob trial.
70	4	"Maid Service"	Tucker Gates	Ruel Fischmann	October 2, 1994
Rich people force Cuban girls into sexual slavery.
71	5	"Carrie & Jessie"	Peter Ellis	Doug Heyes Jr.	October 9, 1994
A young woman suffering from split personality is suspected of murder.
72	6	"Where There's a Will..."	Jeff Woolnough	Story by : Neal Dobrofsky & Tippi Dobrofsky; Teleplay by : Peter McCabe	October 16, 1994
Chris and Rita investigate the death of the patriarch of a Palm Beach family.
73	7	"Red Flag"	Ralph Hemecker	Gordon T. Dawson	October 23, 1994
A woman testing the fidelity of married men is murdered on the job.
74	8	"Ask The Dust"	Michael Levine	Michael Ahnemann	October 30, 1994
The most prominent family in Palm Beach is involved in a murder.
75	9	"The Mud-Queen Murders"	Richard Friedman	Evan Smith	November 6, 1994
A mud wrestler is murdered. NOTE – Gilbert Gottfried, from USA Network's USA Up All Night, guest-stars as Joey Mellman.
76	10	"School of Hard Rocks"	Charles Siebert	Darrell Fetty	November 13, 1994
A songwriter is suspected of murdering a rock stars husband.
77	11	"Time Share"	Harvey S. Laidman	Garner Simmons	November 20, 1994
A country-club member is murdered.
78	12	"Vengeance"	Michael Levine	David E. Peckinpah	December 4, 1994
A prostitute is murdered.
79	13	"Ghosts of the Past"	Charles Siebert	Peter McCabe	December 11, 1994
Both the husband and private investigator of a socialite turns up dead.
80	14	"Pas de Deux"	Bob Thompson	Michael Zand and Terri Treas	January 8, 1995
A male ballet dancer is murdered, and identical twin ballerinas become the prime suspects. One of the twins was the dancer's wife, the other was his mistress.
81	15	"Mrs. Carlisle"	Richard Friedman	Michael Ahnemann	January 15, 1995
The owner of a tennis club is murdered.
82	16	"Brother's Keeper"	Harvey S. Laidman	Story by : Thom Sherman & Frank Tarloff; Teleplay by : David E. Peckinpah	January 22, 1995
A photographer is being framed for murder.
83	17	"Champagne On Ice"	Rob Estes	Lou Comici & Liz Comici	January 29, 1995
A millionaire's wife becomes the suspect, when a private investigator is murdered.
84	18	"I Know What Scares You"	Harvey S. Laidman	Doug Heyes Jr.	February 19, 1995
A stalker preys on college students.
85	19	"New Blood"	Mitzi Kapture	Story by : James L. Novack; Teleplay by : James L. Novack & Terri Treas & Michael Zand	February 26, 1995
Chris is accused of sexual harassment.
86	20	"Community Service"	Lee Unbrick	Terri Treas & Michael Zand	March 5, 1995
A judge is accused of getting sexual favors from the wives of criminals.
87	21	"Cadillac Jack"	David E. Peckinpah	David E. Peckinpah & Jerry Patrick Brown	March 12, 1995
A friend of Rita is murdered.
88	22	"Into the Fire"	Charles Siebert	Doug Heyes Jr.	March 19, 1995
Chris and Rita search for a man suspected of gun smuggling.

=== Season 5 (1995–96) ===
No. overall	No. in season	Title	Directed by	Written by	Original release date
89	1	"Pulp Addiction"	James Darren	Story by : Heidi Sorensen & William Bigelow; Teleplay by : William Bigelow	September 17, 1995
A romance novelist's assistant is murdered, but it is later revealed she might have had a ghostwriter.
90	2	"The Lonely Hunter"	Jeff Woolnough	Doug Heyes Jr.	September 24, 1995
Rita gets involved with a photographer who is suspected of murdering his ex-wife model.
91	3	"Sweet Punishment"	Terrence O'Hara	Dana Coen	October 1, 1995
When a pimp is murdered, Chris and Rita investigate his workers. Chris befriends one of them and her younger brother.
92	4	"Friendly Persuasion"	Charles Siebert	Michael Zand & Terri Treas	October 8, 1995
A hairdresser becomes a suspect in the murder of a prominent couple.
93	5	"Family Affairs"	Peter Ellis	Garner Simmons	October 15, 1995
When Chris accidentally kills a teenager during a car chase, he is taken off the case of a murdered socialite.
94	6	"Tricks of the Trade"	Paris Barclay	Robin Bernheim	October 22, 1995
After a male escort is found killed, Chris goes undercover as one. Rita has to go on a date with Lipschitz's godson.
95	7	"Kill Shot"	Robert Walden	Story by : Thom Sherman; Teleplay by : Dana Coen	October 29, 1995
A beach volleyball player is killed. Her stalker is suspected, but later turns up dead as well. Meanwhile, Chris buys a used Pontiac Trans Am that has a bunch of trouble.
96	8	"Partners: Part 1"	Ron Satlof	David E. Peckinpah	November 5, 1995
While Chris tries to figure out his relationship situation, Rita is assigned a transfer partner from Chicago, Michael Price, to investigate the drug-related death of the daughter of a socialite. They go undercover as customers to try to bust the drug dealer.
97	9	"Partners: Part 2"	David E. Peckinpah	David E. Peckinpah	November 12, 1995
A car bomb has turned the case from narcotics to homicide. Chris must work together with Rita and Michael to solve the case while trying to define his relationship with Rita.
98	10	"Glory Days"	Ron Garcia	Jay Huguely	November 26, 1995
Chris hunts the killer of a basketball star's girlfriend. Rita has flu-like symptoms.
99	11	"Till Death Do Us Part"	Ron Satlof	William Bigelow	December 3, 1995
Chris teams up with a new partner to find the killer of a media mogul.
100	12	"The Last Kiss Goodnight"	Jeff Woolnough	Doug Heyes Jr.	December 10, 1995
A cop is involved in drug dealing. This was the final episode for Estes.
101	13	"Dead Asleep"	David E. Peckinpah	Scott Redman	December 17, 1995
A junkie is suspected of murdering her sister's business partner. This was the final episode for Kapture and the premiere as star billing for Kokotakis and Layton.
102	14	"Sudden Death"	Jeff Woolnough	J. Rickley Dumm	January 7, 1996
A pair of football stars are involved in a cheerleader's death.
103	15	"Uncivil Wars"	Charles Siebert	Lisa Seidman	January 14, 1996
A music mogul is a suspect in the death of his wife.
104	16	"Black and Blue"	Peter Ellis	Paul M. Belous	January 21, 1996
The wife of a dead business man admits to killing him in self-defense.
105	17	"Exit Dying"	Corey Eubanks	Story by : Kenneth Rudman; Teleplay by : Jay Huguely	January 28, 1996
A director is suspected of killing a temperamental star.
106	18	"Prey of the Fox"	Ron Satlof	William Bigelow & Doug Heyes Jr.	February 4, 1996
A model hired by a company is killed.
107	19	"Playing Doctor"	Carl Weathers	Hilary J. Bader	February 11, 1996
Holly goes undercover as a patient at a rehab facility.
108	20	"Family Values"	Don Michael Paul	Story by : Michael Marks; Teleplay by : Jay Huguely	February 18, 1996
When a reporter and a politicians assistant dies, the politicians son claims responsibility.
109	21	"Private Dancer"	Todd Amateau	William Bigelow	February 25, 1996
A woman is accused of killing her real estate magnate husband.
110	22	"Body Electric"	Charles Siebert	Doug Heyes Jr.	March 3, 1996
Michael is arrested for the murder of the ex-husband of his new girlfriend. Lipschitz thinks about retiring.

=== Season 6 (1996–97) ===
This marks the first season with Chris Potter, Janet Gunn, and Charlie Brill as stars.

No. overall	No. in season	Title	Directed by	Written by	Original release date
111	1	"Runway Strip"	Don Michael Paul	Stephen J. Cannell	September 15, 1996
A navy pilot is murdered.
112	2	"Compulsion"	Ron Satlof	Kim LeMasters	September 22, 1996
A gay couple, with a crumbling fashion-design empire, is killed.
113	3	"Divorce, Palm Beach Style"	Peter DeLuise	Jack Bernstein	September 29, 1996
Tom and Cassy has a long list of suspects when a divorce attorney is killed.
114	4	"When She Was Bad"	John Paragon	Ethlie Ann Vare	October 6, 1996
Tom and Cassy investigate a private club of society wives.
115	5	"Pre-Judgement Day"	Lizzie Borden	Chris Ruppenthal	October 13, 1996
Tom and Cassy investigate the death of a publishers wife in a car bombing.
116	6	"Loyalty"	Charles Siebert	Kim LeMasters	November 3, 1996
Cassy searches for the killer of a teenager.
117	7	"Talk Dirty to Me"	Peter DeLuise	Jack Bernstein	November 10, 1996
A talkshow host is murdered.
118	8	"Services Rendered"	Chris Nolan	Gerry Conway	November 17, 1996
A male escort is shot to death.
119	9	"Partners In Crime"	Carl Weathers	Doug Heyes Jr.	November 24, 1996
A pair of scammers are accused of killing a socialite.
120	10	"Elective Surgery"	Carl Weathers	Marvin Kupfer	December 15, 1996
A woman takes revenge on her classmates who caused her to be deformed due to a car accident years ago in high school.
121	11	"Appearances"	John Paragon	Philip John Taylor	December 22, 1996
A rap-music producer is killed. An audio recording helps Tom and Cassy assemble the suspects.
122	12	"Blue Collars"	John Paragon	Sonny Gordon	January 5, 1997
Cassy's sister witnesses a mob hit.
123	13	"Peak Experience"	Carl Weathers	Chris Ruppenthal	January 12, 1997
Tom and Cassy try to solve the murder of a self-help author.
124	14	"The Babysitter"	Ron Garcia	Ethlie Ann Vare	January 19, 1997
Tom and Cassy search for the killer of a babysitter.
125	15	"Pumped Up"	Jeff Woolnough	Mark Masuoka	February 2, 1997
The bisexual owner of a fitness club is murdered. Tom's father visits with some surprising news.
126	16	"callme@murder.com"	Anthony Cowley	J. Rickley Dumm	February 9, 1997
A killer is preying on users of a website.
127	17	"Exit the Dragon"	John Paragon	Dean Weinstein	April 6, 1997
Cassy and Tom investigate an international money laundering operation.
128	18	"Pink Elephants"	Perry Husman	Sonny Gordon	April 13, 1997
Two brothers scheme to get the family fortune. Lipschitz is targeted by an alcoholic cop he fired.
129	19	"Three Weeks of the Condor"	Paul Abascal	Stephen J. Cannell	April 20, 1997
People on a film set are being murdered.
130	20	"I Love the Nightlife"	Ron Garcia	Ethlie Ann Vare	April 27, 1997
Two bodies are found drained of blood.
131	21	"The Rock"	Carl Weathers	Bela V. Lavan and Monika Harris	June 1, 1997
A female cadet at a military academy is found dead.
132	22	"Pretty In Black"	John Paragon	Kim LeMasters	June 22, 1997
Three former sorority sisters are being targeted by art thieves.

=== Season 7 (1997–98) ===
No. overall	No. in season	Title	Directed by	Written by	Original release date	Prod. code
133	1	"Silent Witness"	John Paragon	Kim LeMasters	August 3, 1997	TBA
Cassy and Tom investigate a ritual killing.
134	2	"Ladies Man"	John Paragon	David Levinson	August 10, 1997	SS97-712
An FBI agent is murdered.
135	3	"Dirty Little Secrets"	Rachel Feldman	David Levinson	August 17, 1997	TBA
A college student is murdered.
136	4	"A Question of Faith"	Carl Weathers	Jim Piddock	August 24, 1997	TBA
A wealthy woman is found dead. Tom and Cassy thinks it's suicide, until a clairvoyant points out the deceased's husband as a killer.
137	5	"Fevers"	Chris Pechin	Sonny Gordon	September 7, 1997	SS97-703
A lawyer is murdered.
138	6	"Guilt by Association"	Ray Austin	John Scheinfeld	September 21, 1997	SS97-704
A department store heiress and her husband are murdered.
139	7	"Night of the Parrot"	John Paragon	Kim LeMasters	September 28, 1997	SS97-711
A parrot witnesses the poisoning of a socialite's cat and Dog. Tom is assigned to protect the parrot.
140	8	"Air-Tight Alibi"	Martin Wood	Terry Black	October 5, 1997	SS97-710
A woman is killed with a rifle.
141	9	"Family Affair"	Carl Weathers	Alice Miller	November 2, 1997	SS97-706
Tom and Cassy investigate the suspected suicide of a woman.
142	10	"Child's Play"	John Paragon	David Levinson	November 9, 1997	SS97-714
Tom and Cassy investigate the murder of their friends adopted child's biological mom.
143	11	"The Wedge"	Ron Garcia	Sonny Gordon	November 30, 1997	SS97-715
Tom and Cassy investigate a case where a cop accidentally shot his own wife.
144	12	"Pirates of Palm Beach"	Charles Siebert	Joe Yogerst	December 7, 1997	SS97-709
A private eye searching for a sunken treasure is found murdered.
145	13	"Slip-Up"	Tawnia McKiernan	Jerome Beck	December 14, 1997	SS97-708
A cheating wife is eaten by sharks.
146	14	"Rage"	Miles Watkins	Kim LeMasters	January 4, 1998	SS97-716
A football foe of Tom is involved in the drug-related murder of a man.
147	15	"Teacher's Pet"	Chris Pechin	Jim Piddock	January 11, 1998	SS97-719
A teacher is killed.
148	16	"Sea of Love"	Corey Eubanks	Joe Yogerst	January 18, 1998	SS97-718
A lifeguard turns up dead.
149	17	"Total Eclipse"	Ron Garcia	Michael Palmer & Darcy Meyers	February 1, 1998	SS97-717
A woman researching aliens is killed.
150	18	"Three Ring Circus"	Corey Eubanks	Kim LeMasters & David Levinson	March 8, 1998	SS97-723
Tom and Cassy and two private detectives try to hunt down the same witness.
151	19	"The Party"	David Roessell	Frank Cameron	March 22, 1998	SS97-705
Cassy is arrested for speeding in a backwater town. She's sent to a women's prison plaged by a series of mysterious escapes.
152	20	"Ramone P.I."	Martin Wood	Michael Palmer & Darcy Meyers	April 5, 1998	SS97-721
Tom and Cassy team with a private eye to investigate a drowning.
153	21	"Escorting Disaster"	Corey Eubanks	Sonny Gordon	April 12, 1998	SS97-720
A cover girl is on the list of suspects for the murder of a call girl.
154	22	"Genius"	Chris Potter	Story by : Mike Marvin; Teleplay by : Darcy Meyers & Michael Palmer	April 19, 1998	SS97-722
A computer genius frames Cassy for the death of her ex-lover.

=== Season 8 (1998–99) ===
No. overall	No. in season	Title	Directed by	Written by	Original release date	Prod. code
155	1	"Do You Believe In Magic?"	John Paragon	Kim LeMasters	July 26, 1998	SS98-808
Tom and Cassy's only clue in a murder case is a ventriloquist puppet.
156	2	"If the Shoe Fits"	Corey Eubanks	Kathy Slevin	August 2, 1998	SS98-809
A TV producer is murdered.
157	3	"Passion and the Palm Beach Detectives"	Rex Piano	Burt Prelutsky	August 9, 1998	SS98-803
Tom and Cassy investigate the bizarre death of a pool attendant.
158	4	"All the World's a Stage"	Corey Eubanks	Michael Palmer & Darcy Meyers	August 16, 1998	SS98-811
A movie star hangs out with Tom and Cassy to research an upcoming role.
159	5	"Forever"	Kim LeMasters	Kim LeMasters	August 23, 1998	
Tom is in a coma after a gunshot. Cassy tries to bring down the gangster who put a contract out on her partner.
160	6	"Hidden Agenda"	Chris Potter	Michael Palmer and Darcy Meyers	August 30, 1998	
Lipschitz tries to prove that a mobster friend of his was involved in the murder of a woman they both loved in the past.
161	7	"Sins of the Mother"	Corey Eubanks	John Scheinfeld	October 4, 1998	SS98-804
An IRS agent is murdered.
162	8	"Fear & Loathing in Palm Beach"	Robert Radler	Rich Hosek & Arnold Rudnick	October 11, 1998	
A psychiatrist may have had something to do with his wife's suicide.
163	9	"The Loneliest Number"	Tawnia McKiernan	Wynne McLaughlin	October 18, 1998	SS98-817
Cassy has a reunion with her mother when she investigates an apparent suicide. Lipschitz gets a visit from an old war buddy.
164	10	"Dead Again... And Again"	Oley Sassone	Gerry Conway	November 29, 1998	
Tom witnesses the attack of a woman.
165	11	"Behind the Music"	Luis Soto	Don Michael Paul	December 6, 1998	SS98-802
The sidekick of a video channel hostess is killed by a sniper.
166	12	"Honor Among Thieves"	Corey Eubanks	Wynne McLaughlin	December 13, 1998	
An artist is murdered and Tom's new flame is a suspect.
167	13	"Strange Bedfellows"	Robert Radler	Burt Prelutsky	January 17, 1999	SS98-812
The mistress of a senator is the victim of hit-and-run.
168	14	"It's the Great Pumpkin, Harry"	Chris Potter	David Olmsted	January 24, 1999	
A murder suspect may be a witch.
169	15	"Killer App"	Todd Amateau	Michael Palmer & Darcy Meyers	February 28, 1999	
A computer geek is found dead.
170	16	"Dance Fever"	Oley Sassone	Stephen Black & Henry Stern	March 7, 1999	
Cassy's dance teacher is killed.
171	17	"Cook's Tour"	Martin Wood	Terry Black	March 21, 1999	
A chef participating in an international cooking contest is killed by one of his own ingredients.
172	18	"Where & When"	Corey Eubanks	Scott Levitta	March 28, 1999	
The cheating wife of a race car driver is found dead.
173	19	"A Clockwork Florida Orange"	Tawnia McKiernan	Daniel Lombard Ewen	April 4, 1999	
A teen gang inspired by a violent movie from the 70's, begin a deadly war.
174	20	"Dream Weavers"	John Blizek	Elinor Jewett & Tim Davis	April 11, 1999	SS98-815
A group of college grads blackmail Palm Beach citizens.
175	21	"Noir (Part 1)"	David Roessell	Kathy Slevin	April 18, 1999	
When an unarmed suspect is accidentally killed by Tom, Cassy tries to clear his name.
176	22	"Noir (Part 2)"	Janet Gunn	Kim LeMasters	April 18, 1999	
Cassy tries to save her partner.
