= Hell Town (TV series) =

American drama television series

- Robert Blake as Father Rivers in Hell Town
- Genre: Drama
- Created by: Lyman P. Docker
- Starring: Robert Blake; Whitman Mayo
- Theme music composer: George Romanis
- Opening theme: "Hell Town" performed by Sammy Davis Jr.
- Country of origin: United States
- Original language: English
- No. of seasons: 1
- No. of episodes: 15

Production
- Camera setup: Single-camera
- Running time: 60 minutes
- Production companies: Micky Productions; Columbia Pictures Television

Original release
- Network: NBC
- Release: September 11 – December 25, 1985

Hell Town is an American drama television series that aired on NBC from September 11 until December 25, 1985. The series features Robert Blake.

== Synopsis ==
Blake stars as Noah "Hardstep" Rivers, a hard-living Catholic priest at a church in a crime-ridden neighborhood on the east side of Los Angeles. Rivers was rather unusual for a priest, as he was a former criminal, played billiards, and didn't have the greatest of speaking skills. Despite all of this, Rivers was the perfect man to lead his church, as he grew up in the neighborhood, so he knew about the gangs and drug dealers who lived there and attacked his parishioners.

== Cast ==
- Robert Blake as Father Noah "Hardstep" Rivers
- Whitman Mayo as One Ball
- Jeff Corey as Lawyer Sam
- Natalie Core as Mother Maggie
- Vonetta McGee as Sister Indigo
- Isabel Grandin as Sister Angel Cakes
- Tony Longo as Stump
- Rhonda Dotson as Sister Daisy
- Zitto Kazann as Crazy Horse

== Episodes ==
No.	Title	Directed by	Written by	Original release date
TBA	"Pilot"	Don Medford	Story by : Robert Blake; Teleplay by : Robert Blake & E. Nick Alexander & Brian Cassidy	March 6, 1985
1	"Let My Jenny Go"	Peter Levin	E. Nick Alexander	September 11, 1985
2	"The People vs. Willy the Goat"	Robert Gist	George F. McGough	September 18, 1985
3	"Fast Louie"	Richard Irving	John D.F. Black	September 25, 1985
4	"Hell Town Goes Bananas"	Don Medford	George F. McGough	October 2, 1985
5	"Hell Town Goes Bananas"	Don Medford	George F. McGough	October 2, 1985
6	"I Will Abide"	Bill Duke	B.W. Sandefur	October 23, 1985
7	"Stumpy Boy"	Ernest Pintoff	Story by : Robert Earll; Teleplay by : Paul Magistretti	October 30, 1985
8	"Lords of War"	John Florea	Story by : Harry A. Lewis & Jack Laird; Teleplay by : Doc Barnett	November 6, 1985
9	"The One Called Daisy"	Ernest Pintoff	Gerry Day	November 13, 1985
10	"Love and Four Corners"	Joseph Manduke	Patt Shea & Harriett Weiss	November 20, 1985
11	"My Girl Friend, Annie"	Sam Freedle	William T. Zacha	November 27, 1985
12	"A Wedding in Hell Town"	Ernest Pintoff	Story by : Doc Barnett & Don Balluck; Teleplay by : Doc Barnett	December 4, 1985
13	"The Rat Man Cometh"	Alan Crosland Jr.	Rift Fournier	December 11, 1985
14	"Straight to Hell"	Cliff Bole	Paul Magistretti	December 18, 1985
15	"One Ball"	Joseph Manduke	John D.F. Black	December 25, 1985

== Production notes ==
The series' theme song was performed by Sammy Davis Jr., who also sang the theme for Blake's previous series, Baretta. The Hell Town pilot film aired on NBC on March 6, 1985.

== Ratings ==
Following Highway to Heaven on NBC on Wednesday nights, the series got off to a flying start. The numbers for the premiere (17.5 or 15 million viewers) actually surpassed those of its lead-in. It finished 13th for the week. More good news followed in week two when the show cracked the top 10, finishing at No. 7 (just behind its lead-in). Remarkably, the numbers grew from week one to week two by over a million viewers.

Then, ABC's mega hit Dynasty returned on September 25 and knocked the show from the 10 into the low 30's and shaved off about 25% of its audience in one night. Week 4 was more of the same as the series sunk to No. 46 and dropped nearly 40% of its lead-in audience. A two-week hiatus (for coverage of the Major League Baseball playoffs) followed.

Upon its return the numbers did improve slightly but the writing seemed to be on the wall. The November sweeps episodes featured it in a heated battle for viewers with its CBS competition Charlie & Co. and barely winning most weeks despite the much stronger lead-in. Ultimately, NBC decided the numbers were not good enough (though it was a top 50 show) and officially pulled the plug. The last original episode aired Christmas night 1985.
