= Peter Iacangelo =

American film, stage, and television actor (1948–2021)

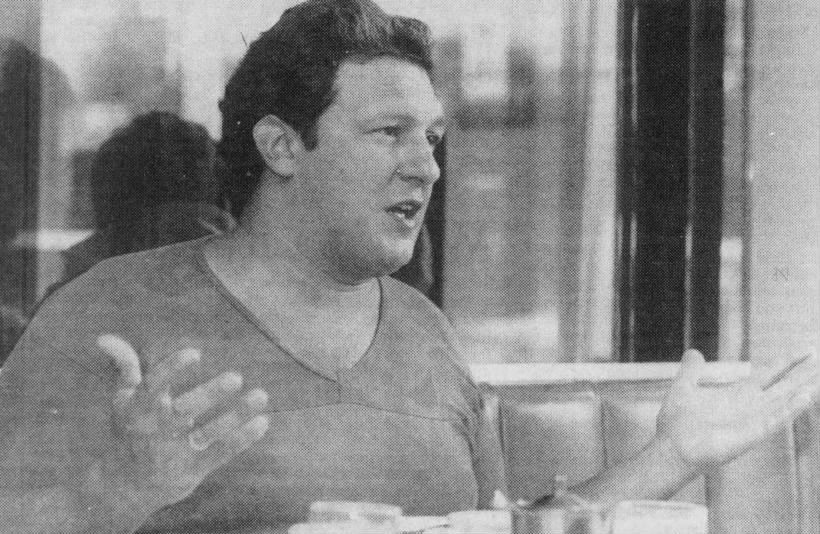
- Iacangelo in 1986
- Born: August 13, 1948; Brooklyn, New York, U.S.
- Died: November 17, 2021 (aged 73); West Columbia, South Carolina, U.S.
- Education: Hofstra University
- Occupations: Film and television actor
- Years active: 1976–1999
- Spouse: Melody Marzola (m. 1975)
- Children: 3

Peter Iacangelo Jr. (August 13, 1948 – November 17, 2021) was an American film, stage and television actor. He was perhaps best known for playing Lou, the irascible owner of Lou's Tavern in the 1999 film Fight Club.

== Life and career ==
Iacangelo was born in Brooklyn, New York on August 13, 1948. He attended Hofstra University. Iacangelo began his acting career in 1976, appearing in the Broadway play Threepenny Opera.

Iacangelo made his screen debut in the 1978 film Bloodbrothers. In 1980 he appeared in an American production of the play Filumena.

Later in his career, Iacangelo appeared and guest-starred in numerous film and television programs including The Drew Carey Show, Cheers (and its spin-off The Tortellis), Hanky Panky, Hill Street Blues, Night of the Running Man, Taxi, Hardcastle and McCormick, St. Elsewhere, Look Who's Talking Now, Quantum Leap, Archie Bunker's Place, Becker, Cagney & Lacey, Truth or Consequences, N.M., St. Elsewhere, Hero at Large, Who's the Boss?, The Jeffersons, They Came from Outer Space, Murphy Brown, ALF, We're Talking Serious Money, Mr. Belvedere, Dear John, Family Matters and Tattoo.

Iacangelo retired from acting in 1999, last appearing in the film Fight Club, playing Lou, the irascible owner of Lou's Tavern.

== Death ==
Iacangelo died in West Columbia, South Carolina on November 17, 2021, at the age of 73.
