= Silk Stalkings =

American crime drama television series (1991–1999)

- Genre: Crime drama
- Created by: Stephen J. Cannell
- Starring: Mitzi Kapture; Rob Estes; Nick Kokotakis; Tyler Layton; Chris Potter; Janet Gunn; Charlie Brill
- Narrated by: Fred Melamed
- Theme music composer: Mike Post
- Composer: Danny Lux
- Country of origin: United States
- Original language: English
- No. of seasons: 8
- No. of episodes: 176 (list of episodes)

Production
- Executive producers: Stephen J. Cannell; Stu Segall; David E. Peckinpah; Kim LeMasters; Jack Bernstein
- Running time: 48 minutes
- Production companies: Stu Segall Productions; Cannell Entertainment (Note: Known as Stephen J. Cannell Productions Inc for (seasons 1–4)); Columbia Pictures Television (season 5); New World Entertainment (seasons 5–6); 20th Century Fox Television (seasons 6–8)

Original release
- Network: CBS
- Release: November 7, 1991 – June 10, 1993
- Network: USA Network
- Release: September 26, 1993 – April 18, 1999

Silk Stalkings is an American crime drama television series that premiered on CBS on November 7, 1991, as part of the network's late-night Crimetime After Primetime programming package. Broadcast for two seasons until CBS ended the Crimetime experiment in June 1993, the subsequent six seasons ran exclusively on USA Network until the series finale on April 18, 1999. The show was creator Stephen J. Cannell's longest-running series. Its title is a wordplay on "silk stockings".

The series portrays the daily lives of two detectives who solve sexually based crimes of passion ("silk stalkings") among the ultra-rich of Palm Beach, Florida. Most episodes were shot in San Diego, California, while some were filmed in Scottsdale, Arizona.

== Synopsis ==
=== Chris and Rita ===
From 1991 to 1995, the lead characters were played by Rob Estes and Mitzi Kapture, as detectives Christopher Lorenzo and Rita Lee Lance, respectively. The story lines were told in a partially first-person perspective focusing on Lance, who would speak in voiceovers throughout the episodes. Early in the series, Ben Vereen played Rita's boss, Captain Hutchinson ("Hutch"). Vereen was compelled to retire from the show during the second season due to an off-screen accident, but he returned for a few guest appearances. His successor was Lt. Hudson, played by Robert Gossett, who stayed on until the third season. Chris and Rita's new boss, who would stay with the show for its duration, was Charlie Brill as Captain Harry Lipschitz. Brill went on to appear in the most episodes of any actor, 129, ahead of Kapture's 101 and Estes' 100. He was promoted to the opening credits starting with season six (none of the previous captains in the series had achieved this).

Brill's real-life wife Mitzi McCall played Lipschitz's free-spirited wife Frannie on the series, and the two provided some occasional comic relief amid the dramatic tension of the story lines. They also appeared in the second season playing completely different characters. Working prominently with Lorenzo and Lance was assistant district attorney George Donovan (William Anton). Various recurring characters came and went, notably Dennis Paladino as mob boss Donnie "Dogs" DiBarto (DiBelco in his first appearance); John Byner as Cotton Dunn, a cunning but likable con artist; Scott Atkins as Officer Perry, a rookie cop; Kim Morgan Greene as Melissa Cassidy, a late-night radio talk-show host, sex therapist, and old flame of Chris's; Danny Gans as Roger, a coroner who frequently (and unsuccessfully) tried to get Rita to go out with him; Marie Marshall as Solange, a local photographer with a faux French accent who crossed paths with Chris and Rita in the second season; and Lucy Lin, who played forensic expert Dr. Noriko Weinstein. Actress Freda Foh Shen took over Lin's role in later episodes. In the first season, Rita was shown to suffer from occasionally intense headaches, which were caused by a blood bubble in her brain. Rita opted not to have surgery to fix this because it was deemed too high-risk. However, as the series went on, this condition was gradually phased out of the plot and was never mentioned again. In the second episode of the first season, Going to Babylon, it was revealed that Rita's real name is Rita Lee Fontana. Her father, Donald was a wealthy businessman who lost his fortune in a series of bad business dealings involving a corrupt fellow businessman when she was six years old. Donald fell into a state of severe depression and alcoholism which eventually culminated in him committing suicide. Rita was adopted by Don and Sue Lance and she took their name in gratitude for the kindness and love they showed her growing up. Rita and Chris would go on to arrest the man responsible for her father's bankruptcy in that same episode.

Estes and Kapture were equal co-stars. The opening credits alternated, one week showing Estes first and then Kapture, the following week showing Kapture first and then Estes. The opening montage of quick cuts had "teasers" that suggested the sexy and violent subject matter of the show, but were not taken from any of the show's actual episodes. According to Stephen Cannell, in a DVD extra, they were developed initially as a promotion, filmed and assembled by Ralph Hemecker in a single day of filming, and featuring a leggy blonde actress/model whom Cannell said was named Avalon Jones. In the first two episodes of the series, Kapture was shown first, and then Estes; they alternated after that, except for Kapture's final episode, in which she (and not Estes) appeared in the opening montage, followed by the two new co-stars.

Two off-screen events in the summer of 1995 were pivotal to the show and were worked into the story line. Both actors were ready to leave the series, Estes to pursue other acting opportunities and Kapture to take time off for her first child.

Estes had first flirted with departure at the end of the third season (spring of 1994). The season ended in a cliffhanger episode, "Dark Heart", with Chris being shot by an obsessed woman, played by Crystal Chappell. Chris was rushed to the hospital in an ambulance as the closing credits rolled. After negotiations, Estes decided to renew his contract, and the fourth season (fall 1994) began with Chris' recovery from his near-fatal wounds in a two-part episode, "Natural Selection", that was later released on VHS as a two-hour film.

In the fifth season (fall 1995), Chris and Rita's mutual attraction finally moved from friendship to love in a two-part episode in November, called "Partners". Nick Kokotakis, as detective Michael Price, was introduced during that episode. Rita, who was promoted to lieutenant, was soon confirmed to be pregnant (as was Kapture in real life), and Chris and Rita were married in an early December episode titled "Till Death Do Us Part". The next week's episode, "The Last Kiss Goodnight", ended with Chris being shot and killed in the line of duty.

Kapture appeared in one more episode, "Dead Asleep". This episode's credits featured Kapture but not Estes (for the only time in the series), as well as Kokotakis and Tyler Layton, who was introduced in the previous episode as Chris's new partner, detective Holly Rawlins. Most of the episode, which began with Rita, Harry and Frannie Lipschitz, Price, Rawlins, and Donovan at Chris' burial, was spent focusing on Michael and Holly's first case. At the end of the show, the grief-stricken Rita spends one final scene talking to Chris at his gravesite and saying goodbye to Lipschitz, and leaves the force for parts unknown.

=== Tom and Cassy ===
With Estes and Kapture gone from the show, Kokotakis and Layton took over the lead roles. Fans of the show did not embrace the new characters, and they were replaced after that half-season by Chris Potter and Janet Gunn. Gunn, who starred in the Crimetime After Primetime series Dark Justice as Kelly Cochrane in 1992 and '93, previously played a secretary arrested for murder in season 3.

Unlike the transition that was played out between Chris and Rita and Michael and Holly, no on-screen explanation was given for Michael and Holly's departure, and fans of the series sometimes refer to them as the "lost cast". ADA George Donovan was also written out of the series at the end of season five, leaving Harry and Frannie Lipschitz as the lone holdovers from the Lance and Lorenzo episodes.

The detectives moved into an upgraded precinct in season seven.

The romantic chemistry between Potter and Gunn's characters, Tom Ryan and Cassandra St. John, respectively (who, according to the story line, had been married to and divorced from one another before their arrival on the series), revived interest in the show and it rebounded in the ratings. After three additional seasons, USA cancelled the series in 1999. The final episode of the final season, in spring 1999, placing Tom's career and relationship with Cassy on the rocks, was a cliffhanger with no resolution.

== Cast ==
=== Main ===
In the opening title cards, the two stars (Kapture/Estes, Kokotakis/Layton, and Potter/Gunn) alternate star billing on each episode:

- Mitzi Kapture as Sgt. (Note: Lance is promoted to Lt. in season 5) Rita Lee Lance (seasons 1–5)
- Rob Estes as Sgt. Chris Lorenzo (seasons 1–5)
- Charlie Brill as Capt. Harry Lipschitz (seasons 3–5 recurring, seasons 6–8 starring)
- Nick Kokotakis as Det. Michael Price (season 5)
- Tyler Layton as Det. Holly Rawlins (season 5)
- Chris Potter as Det. Sgt. Tom Ryan (seasons 6–8)
- Janet Gunn as Det. Sgt. Cassandra "Cassy" St. John (seasons 6–8)

=== Recurring ===
- Ben Vereen as Capt. Ben "Hutch" Hutchinson (seasons 1–3)
- William Anton as Assistant D.A. George Donovan (seasons 1–5)
- Robert Gossett as Lt. Hudson (seasons 2–3)
- Mitzi McCall as Frannie Lipschitz (season 4–8)
- Scott Atkins as Officer Perry (season 1)

== Episodes ==
Season	Episodes	Originally released		
Season	Episodes	First released	Last released	Network
1	20	November 7, 1991	May 14, 1992	CBS
2	24	September 17, 1992	June 10, 1993	CBS
3	22	September 26, 1993	March 27, 1994	USA Network
4	22	September 18, 1994	March 19, 1995	USA Network
5	22	September 17, 1995	March 3, 1996	USA Network
6	22	September 15, 1996	June 22, 1997	USA Network
7	22	August 3, 1997	April 19, 1998	USA Network
8	22	July 26, 1998	April 18, 1999	USA Network

== Home media ==
Anchor Bay Entertainment released the first five seasons of Silk Stalkings on DVD in Region 1 between 2004 and 2006. As of 2010, these releases have been discontinued and are out of print.

On October 14, 2009, it was announced that Mill Creek Entertainment had acquired the rights to several Stephen J. Cannell series including Silk Stalkings. Season 1 was re-released on DVD on March 9, 2010.

On October 22, 2013, Mill Creek Entertainment released seasons six, seven, and eight together in one collection entitled: Silk Stalkings - Seasons 6, 7 and 8: The Ryan and St. John Cases.

On January 13, 2023, Visual Entertainment released Silk Stalkings - The Complete Collection, which contains all 8 seasons of the series together in one collection for the very first time.
