= A Reason to Live (1985 film) =

- Genre: Drama
- Written by: Robert Lewin
- Directed by: Peter Levin
- Starring: Rick Schroder; Peter Fonda; Deidre Hall
- Music by: Miles Goodman
- Country of origin: United States
- Original language: English

Production
- Executive producer: Doreen Bergesen
- Producer: Robert Papazian
- Cinematography: John McPherson
- Editor: Eric A. Sears
- Running time: 120 minutes
- Production company: Robert Papazian Productions

Original release
- Network: NBC
- Release: January 7, 1985

A Reason to Live is a 1985 American made-for-television drama film starring Rick Schroder, Peter Fonda and Deidre Hall, directed by Peter Levin. It was originally broadcast on NBC on January 7, 1985.

== Plot ==
Gus Stewart (Peter Fonda) finds his relationship with his wife Dolores (Deidre Hall) is becoming strained when he becomes jealous of one of Dolores' male co-workers, whom she has invited to the house for Thanksgiving dinner.

After dinner, Gus retreats to the attic, where he pulls out a .45 pistol from a desk drawer. Concerned about Gus' behavior, his 13 1/2-year-old son Alex (Ricky Schroder) follows him, but doesn't see the pistol. Later that night, Alex overhears his parents arguing. Unable to sleep, he goes downstairs, where he sees his dad leave a note on the table. He also sees Gus working on a will, but when he asks about it, Gus brushes him off.

The next day, Alex loads up the car for a weekend lodge trip, but notices his dad's pistol is missing when he and his friend Ellen (Tracey Gold) explore the attic. He also learns that Gus has decided not to go on the trip. Alex becomes even more worried when his dad gives him an expensive fishing rod, which he knows Gus highly values. Alex and Dolores leave, but Alex convinces his mom to go on without him. Back home, Alex finds his dad's note, which has the phone number to the local Suicide Prevention Center. Alex goes to the boat harbor where his dad works, but learns that Gus was fired a week ago.

Alex visits the center, where he tells counselor Bob Cousins (Bruce Weitz) about his dad's behavior the past couple of days. Saying the center can't really help unless the person contemplating suicide calls them first, Cousins tells Alex to talk to his dad, giving him a list of behavioral warning signs. On the bus ride home, Ellen tells Alex that she has been hearing rumors about his mom having an affair.

Alex finds Gus reviewing his will and some old photographs, and tries to get him to open up. Unwilling to do so, Gus tells Alex that he'll have him stay with a cousin for the weekend. Alex tries to get one of his dad's friends to invite him out. When that fails, he visits Isabel Bennett (Carrie Snodgress), a woman who Gus once had a relationship with, and gets her to drop by. While Isabel talks to Gus, Alex and Ellen try unsuccessfully to locate the gun. Isabel and Ellen leave, and Gus and Alex share a few drinks as Alex tries to cheer his dad up. Gus finally relents and tells Alex he doesn't have to go see his cousin.

The next morning, Gus calls Dolores at the lodge. Dolores says she's not coming back and also admits that she's not at the lodge alone. After Gus hangs up, he becomes agitated and tells Alex he's going to take him to the airport. Panicking, Alex tries to call Cousins at the center, but Gus interrupts him, causing Alex to hide in his bedroom. Gus forces his way in, grabs Alex, and shoves him into the car. As Gus speeds toward the airport, Alex confronts Gus about the past few days and his knowledge that Gus is contemplating suicide. When Gus doesn't respond, an exasperated Alex jumps out of the car, leading to a foot chase on the highway that nearly results in Alex being run over. Gus rescues Alex and promises his son that he won't ever leave him.

== Cast ==
- Rick Schroder as Alex Stewart
- Peter Fonda as Gus Stewart
- Deidre Hall as Delores Stewart
- Tracey Gold as Ellen Maynes
- Maxine Stuart as Fay Stewart
- Carrie Snodgress as Isobel Bennett
- Bruce Weitz as Bob Cousins
- Peter Jason as Dick Biheller
