= Tyler Layton =

American actress

- Occupations: Stage, television actress

Tyler Layton is an American actress.

Layton starred as Detective Holly Rawlins in TV's Silk Stalkings from 1995 - 1996.

== Theatre work ==
- Rabbit Hole as Izzy
- The Merry Wives of Windsor as Mistress Ford
- Room Service as Christina Marlow
- Love's Labor's Lost as Rosaline
- Henry VI as Lady Grey
- Much Ado About Nothing as Hero
- Noises Off as Brooke Ashton
- The Winter's Tale as Perdita
- Taming of the Shrew as Bianca
- King Lear as Regan
- Troilus en Cressida as Cressida
- Measure for Measure as Isabella
- Stop Kiss as Callie
