= Getting There (film) =

- DVD cover
- Directed by: Steve Purcell
- Written by: Michael Swerdlick
- Produced by: Neil Steinberg; Natan Zahavi
- Starring: Mary-Kate and Ashley Olsen
- Cinematography: Brian Sullivan; James LeGoy; David Lewis
- Edited by: Sherwood Jones
- Music by: Steve Porcaro
- Production companies: Dualstar Entertainment Group; Tapestry Films
- Distributed by: Warner Home Video
- Release date: June 11, 2002
- Running time: 90 minutes
- Country: United States
- Language: English

Getting There is a 2002 American adventure comedy film starring Mary-Kate and Ashley Olsen. The film was produced by Dualstar Entertainment Group and Tapestry Films and released by Warner Home Video on June 11, 2002.

== Plot ==
Taylor and Kylie Hunter are celebrating their 16th birthday and are licensed to drive. They plan a trip to Salt Lake City, Utah with their friends for the 2002 Winter Olympics. When they stop at a local restaurant on the way, their car is stolen and next they board the wrong plane to San Diego. Determined to make it to Utah in time for the Olympics, the teenagers take a coach from LA to Vegas, but get separated at a gas station. Kylie and half of the gang makes it to Vegas, where they end up taking part in a Vegas wedding, whilst Taylor and the other half of the gang are stranded in a one horse town.

While trying to get ahold of her sister, Taylor meets Charly, a girl her age with a pick-up truck who offers to give her and her friends a ride to Vegas, but her truck breaks down. Charly reveals that she, who seemed like a humble farm girl, actually lives in a mansion and owns a private jet. Her dad offers to fly all of the teens to Salt Lake City.

Taylor and Kylie arrive in Utah too late for the Olympics. Taylor is upset because she would have liked to see her favourite Athlete, Alex Reisher, compete. Nonetheless, the friends decide to have fun by holding their own Olympics. Taylor meets a young man and they end up spending the day skiing together, but she never sees his face. It is not until a month later when the girls get their car back, and Taylor sees her picture in the paper, that she realizes she spent the day skiing with her Olympic crush Alex Reisher.

== Cast ==
- Ashley Olsen as Taylor Hunter
- Mary-Kate Olsen as Kylie Hunter
- Billy Aaron Brown as Danny
- Heather Lindell as Jenn
- Jeff D'Agostino as Joshua / “Toast”
- Talon Ellithorpe as Sam
- Holly Towne as Lyndi
- Alexandra Picatto as Charly
- Janet Gunn as Pam Hunter
- William Bumiller as Gary Hunter
- Jason Benesh as Alexander
- Ricki Lopez as Juan
- Shelley Malil as Raj
- Marcus Smythe as Mr. Simms
- Cheyenne Wilbur as Male Proctor
- Deborah Hinderstein as Female Instructor
- James Kiriyama Lem as Male Instructor
- Chene Lawson as Ticket Clerk
- Tracy Arbuckle as Diane
- Sterling Rice as Young Female Tourist
- Jeff Thomas Johnson as Waiter in Ski Lodge

== Filming details ==
The film was produced by Dualstar and Tapestry Films and distributed by Warner Bros. Getting There was filmed in Santa Barbara, California; Salt Lake City, Utah; Las Vegas, Nevada and New Mexico.
