= Night of the Running Man =

- Theatrical release poster
- Directed by: Mark L. Lester
- Written by: Lee Wells
- Based on: Night of the Running Man by Lee Wells
- Produced by: Dana Dubovsky; Mark L. Lester; George W. Perkins
- Starring: Andrew McCarthy; Scott Glenn; Janet Gunn; John Glover; Peter Iacangelo; Judith Chapman; Todd Susman; Wayne Newton
- Cinematography: Mark Irwin
- Edited by: David Berlatsky
- Music by: Christopher Franke
- Distributed by: Trimark Pictures
- Release date: January 19, 1995 (U.S.)
- Running time: 93 minutes
- Country: United States
- Language: English

Night of the Running Man is a 1995 American crime thriller film directed by Mark L. Lester and written by Lee Wells, who adapted it from his novel of the same name. It stars Andrew McCarthy and Scott Glenn. The film debuted on HBO before being released direct-to-video. McCarthy plays a cab driver who stumbles upon a large sum of money stolen from the mob. When mob hit men target him, he flees.

== Plot ==
Jerry Logan, a cab driver in Las Vegas, picks up a nervous passenger who offers him $100 to get to the airport as quickly as possible. Unknown to Jerry, the man has stolen $1 million from Al Chambers, a mob-connected casino manager. Chambers himself skimmed the money from mob boss August Gurino. Knowing that Gurino will kill him if he notices the missing money, Chambers sends assassins to recover it. Although they kill the thief, Logan escapes with the cash. Desperate, Chambers hires an expensive hitman, David Eckhart, who tracks Logan to his house. Logan escapes with the money and flees the city on a train. Before he leaves, he confides in a friendly waitress, and Eckhart intimidates her into revealing Logan's destination. Eckhart kills the waitress and follows Logan.

In Salt Lake City, Eckhart captures but loses Logan at the airport as he boards a flight for Los Angeles. Eckhart contacts his associate, Derek Mills, who pays off all the cab drivers at the Los Angeles airport. With no other choices available, Logan chooses Mills' cab. Mills kidnaps him at gunpoint and, at his house, burns Logan's feet in boiling water to make escape impossible. However, Mills underestimates Logan, who overpowers him and flees with the money. When Logan collapses unconscious on the street, he is taken to the hospital, where he meets nurse Chris Altman. Altman treats his wounds and covers for him when Eckhart comes looking. Mills, who is in the same hospital, overhears that Altman has taken Logan to a hotel for safety, and he alerts Eckhart.

Although Logan encourages Altman to leave, Eckhart bursts in before she can. The two escape together and head for Altman's house after depositing the money in a safety deposit box. At her house, Logan and Altman have sex. When Logan wakes in the morning, Eckhart is waiting for him in the kitchen. Logan proposes a deal: he will split the money with Eckhart, and, in return, Eckhart lets both him and Altman survive. Eckhart accepts the deal and leaves for Las Vegas, where he kills Chambers and his wife on the orders of Gurino. When Eckhart returns to Los Angeles, Logan attempts to ambush him but fails. Frustrated by Logan's reluctance to produce the money, Eckhart orders Mills to beat Altman. Logan reveals that he has hidden it in the basement, and Eckhart kills Mills when Mills offers to retrieve it.

Eckhart and Logan proceed to the basement. Logan disarms Eckhart, who only becomes more excited by the heightened tension. Although Eckhart briefly considers killing Altman to flush out Logan, he instead engages Logan in hand-to-hand combat. Armed with a knife, Eckhart stalks Logan in the dark, taunting him as he scores hits. Although Logan briefly surprises Eckhart, Eckhart easily overpowers him and goes for a killing blow. Before Eckhart can finish him, Logan strikes Eckhart with a wooden plank. Both men are surprised when a nail in the plank impales Eckhart, killing him. Now more careful, Logan and Altman leave the country under assumed names and pay cash for their tickets.

== Cast ==
Actor	Role
Scott Glenn	David Eckhart
Andrew McCarthy	Jerry Logan
Janet Gunn	Chris Altman
Wayne Newton	August Gurino
John Glover	Derek Mills
Peter Iacangelo	Al Chambers

== Production ==
It was the first film made for Lester's new company, American World Pictures. He said "It came about by me wanting to make my own films and distribute them, so I could make the kind of films I wanted and have financial backing from my own company."

== Soundtrack ==
A soundtrack album of Christopher Franke's score was released by Super Tracks.

== Reception ==
J. R. Taylor of Entertainment Weekly rated it a letter grade of "B" and called it "a move into Tarantino territory" for director Lester.
