= A Killer Among Us =

- Genre: Drama; Thriller
- Written by: David Westheimer
- Directed by: Peter Levin
- Starring: Jasmine Guy; Anna Maria Horsford; Mykelti Williamson; Dwight Schultz
- Theme music composer: Gary Chang
- Country of origin: United States
- Original language: English

Production
- Producer: Alan Beattie
- Cinematography: Tom Neuwirth
- Editor: Richard Braken
- Running time: 100 minutes
- Production company: DBA Entertainment

Original release
- Network: NBC
- Release: October 29, 1990

A Killer Among Us is a 1990 drama/thriller TV film directed by Peter Levin and starring Jasmine Guy, Dwight Schultz and Anna Maria Horsford.

== Plot ==
Theresa Hopkins is one of twelve jurors who have to decide about a case of assassination. She believes very strongly in the innocence of the young man, but cannot convince the others. During the discussions, she realizes that one member of the jury knows details that he could not know from the trial alone. Since no one believes her suspicions, she investigates on her own.

== Cast ==
- Jasmine Guy as Theresa Hopkins
- Dwight Schultz as Clifford Gillette
- Anna Maria Horsford as Barbara Evans
- Mykelti Williamson as Greg Hopkins
- Lisa Banes as Joanna Westrope
- Neil Giuntoli as Sam Scoggins
- Janet Gunn as Gloria Scoggins
