= Janet Gunn =

American actress (born 1961)

- Born: November 2, 1961 (age 64)
- Occupation: Actress
- Years active: 1978—present

Janet Gunn (born November 2, 1961) is an American actress. She appeared in films Night of the Running Man (1995) and The Quest (1996), and later, from 1996 to 1999, she starred as Detective Cassandra St. John in the USA Network crime drama series Silk Stalkings.

== Career ==
Gunn had starring role of Kelly Cochran in the CBS series Dark Justice from 1992 to 1993. From 1996 to 1999, she starred as Detective Cassandra St. John on the USA Network series Silk Stalkings. Gunn also guest starred on In the Heat of the Night, Dream On, Diagnosis: Murder, CSI: Crime Scene Investigation and Crossing Jordan. Her film credits include Night of the Running Man (1995), The Quest (1996), The Nurse (1997), and Getting There (2002).

== Filmography ==
=== Film ===
Year	Film	Role	Notes
1990	A Killer Among Us	Gloria Scoggins	
1995	Night of the Running Man	Chris Altman	
1996	Carnosaur 3: Primal Species	Dr. Hodges	
1996	The Quest	Carrie Newton	
1996	The Sweeper	Melissa	
1996	Marquis de Sade	Justine	
1997	The Nurse	Karen Martin	
1997	Always Say Goodbye	Blonde Woman	
2000	Ground Zero	Kimberly Stevenson	
2001	Cahoots	Rita	
2001	Lost Voyage	Dana Elway	
2002	Inferno	Darcy Hamilton	
2002	Getting There	Pam Hunter	Nominated — DVD Exclusive Award for Best Supporting Actress
2013	Lost on Purpose	Arlene	

=== Selected television roles ===
- 1992-1993 Dark Justice as Kelly Cochrane (starring seasons 2–3)
- 1994 Renegade as Kat Calhoun
- 1996-1999 Silk Stalkings as Detective Sergeant Cassandra "Cassy" St. John (starring seasons 6–8)
- 2001 The Fugitive as Becca Ross
