= Peter Levin =

American film director

- Born: Daniel Henry Levin; 12 March 1932 (age 93); Trenton, New Jersey United States
- Occupation(s): Film director, television director, theatre director
- Years active: 1967–2012
- Spouse: Audrey Davis Levin
- Children: Kristina Davis

Peter Levin (born Daniel Henry Levin; 12 March 1932) is an American director of film, television and theatre.

== Career ==
Since 1967, Levin has amassed a large number of credits directing episodic television and television films. Some of his television series credits include Love Is a Many Splendored Thing, James at 15, The Paper Chase, Family, Starsky & Hutch, Lou Grant, Fame, Cagney & Lacey, Law & Order and Judging Amy.

Some of his television film credits include Rape and Marriage: The Rideout Case (1980), A Reason to Live (1985), Popeye Doyle (1986), A Killer Among Us (1990), Queen Sized (2008) and among other films. He directed "Heart in Hiding", written by his wife Audrey Davis Levin, for which she received an Emmy for Best Day Time Special in the 1970s.

Prior to becoming a director, Levin worked as an actor in several Broadway productions. He costarred with Susan Strasberg in "[The Diary of Ann Frank]" but had to leave the production when he was drafted into the Army. He trained at the Carnegie Mellon University. Eventually becoming a theatre director, he directed productions at the Long Wharf Theatre and the Pacific Resident Theatre Company. He also co-founded the off-off-Broadway Theatre [the Hardware Poets Playhouse] with his wife Audrey Davis Levin and was also an associate artist of The Interact Theatre Company.
