= Rift Fournier =

American writer and television producer

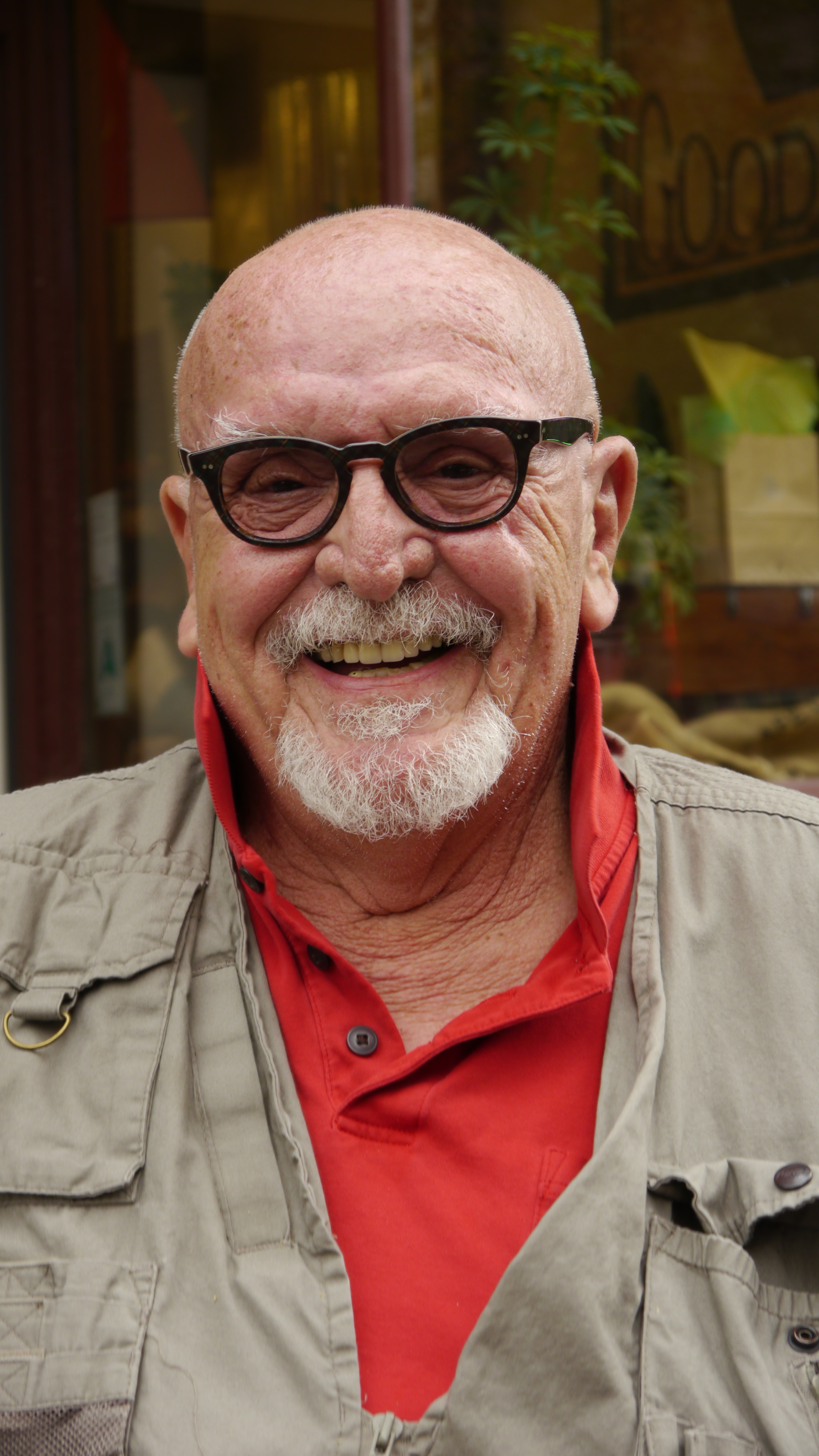
- Rift Fournier, St. Louis 2013
- Born: May 16, 1936; Wichita, Kansas
- Died: October 6, 2013 (aged 77); St. Louis, Missouri
- Occupation(s): Screenwriter, producer

Rift Fournier (May 16, 1936 – October 6, 2013) was an American writer, screenwriter and television producer. Fournier, who lost the ability to walk at 17 years old due to polio, had a long and diverse career in television. He wrote episodes of numerous television series, including Baretta, Charlie's Angels, Highway to Heaven, Hell Town, Kojak, Matlock, Charley Hannah, High Mountain Rangers and NYPD Blue.

Fournier was born in 1936 in Wichita, Kansas, and raised in both Chicago and Omaha, Nebraska. His parents decided to call him "Rift" after a dispute over what they would name their son. Fournier was acting and screenwriting at the Omaha Community Playhouse by the time he was 13 years old. He attended a Jesuit school, where he excelled as an athlete.

Fournier contracted polio during his junior year in high school. On a Sunday morning in 1953, Fournier collapsed while getting out of bed to answer the telephone. He never regained his ability to walk and remained in a wheelchair for the rest of his life. Rift Fournier never let his disability dissuade him from pursuing his career. In a 1986 interview with the Los Angeles Times, he said, "I didn't know [polio] was supposed to stop me from doing something,...You've heard the joke. 'I never knew I was poor.… ' Well, I never knew I was handicapped."

In 1963, Fournier began co-producing The Mike Douglas Show, which was created in Cleveland, Ohio, for syndication.

Between 2004 and 2013, Fournier was an adjunct professor at Lindenwood University. He died in St. Louis, Missouri, on October 6, 2013, at the age of 77. Cause of death was cancer.
