= List of American television actresses =

This is an alphabetical list of American television actresses who have articles on Wikipedia.

Some actors who are well-known for both film and TV work are also included in the list of American film actresses.

== A ==
- Paula Abdul born June 19, 1962 (age 64)
- Donzaleigh Abernathy born August 5, 1957 (age 69)
- Amy Acker born December 5, 1976 (age 49)
- Danneel Ackles born March 18, 1979 (age 47)
- Amy Adams born August 20, 1974 (age 52)
- Joey Lauren Adams born January 9, 1968 (age 58)
- Mary Kay Adams born September 12, 1962 (age 64)
- Pamela Adlon born July 9, 1966 (age 60)
- Keiko Agena born October 3, 1973 (age 53)
- Dianna Agron born April 30, 1986 (age 40)
- Christina Aguilera born December 18, 1980 (age 45)
- Lexi Ainsworth born October 28, 1992 (age 34)
- Malin Åkerman born May 12, 1978 (age 48)
- Mackenzie Aladjem born September 11, 2001 (age 25)
- Jessica Alba born April 28, 1981 (age 45)
- Lola Albright (1924–2017)
- Kristen Alderson born May 29, 1991 (age 35)
- Brooke Alexander born December 13, 1963 (age 62)
- Denise Alexander (1939–2025)
- Erika Alexander born November 19, 1969 (age 57)
- Khandi Alexander born September 4, 1957 (age 69)
- Olivia Alexander born May 17, 1988 (age 38)
- Sasha Alexander born May 17, 1973 (age 53)
- Kim Alexis born July 15, 1960 (age 66)
- Kristian Alfonso born September 5, 1963 (age 63)
- Tatyana Ali born January 24, 1979 (age 47)
- Ana Alicia born December 12, 1956 (age 69)
- Christa B. Allen born November 11, 1991 (age 35)
- Crystal Allen born August 13, 1972 (age 54)
- Debbie Allen born January 16, 1950 (age 76)
- Jonelle Allen born July 8, 1948 (age 78)
- Krista Allen born April 5, 1971 (age 55)
- Rosalind Allen born September 23, 1957 (age 69)
- Kirstie Alley (1951–2022)
- Lindsey Alley born December 6, 1977 (age 48)
- Daniella Alonso born September 22, 1978 (age 48)
- María Conchita Alonso born June 29, 1955 (age 71)
- Cristela Alonzo born January 6, 1979 (age 47)
- Carol Alt born December 1, 1961 (age 64)
- Amerie born January 12, 1980 (age 46)
- Rachel Ames born November 2, 1929 (age 97)
- Mädchen Amick born December 12, 1970 (age 55)
- Andrea Anders born May 10, 1975 (age 51)
- Barbara Anderson born November 27, 1945 (age 80)
- Gillian Anderson born August 9, 1968 (age 58)
- Jolene Anderson born May 26, 1980 (age 46)
- Loni Anderson (1945–2025)
- Melissa Sue Anderson born September 26, 1962 (age 64)
- Melody Anderson born December 3, 1955 (age 70)
- Pamela Anderson born July 1, 1967 (age 59)
- Heather Angel (1909–1986)
- Vanessa Angel born November 10, 1966 (age 60)
- Maya Angelou (1928–2014)
- Jennifer Aniston born February 11, 1969 (age 57)
- Victoria Ann Lewis
- Susan Anton born October 12, 1950 (age 76)
- Shiri Appleby born December 7, 1978 (age 47)
- Christina Applegate born November 25, 1971 (age 54)
- Amy Aquino born March 20, 1957 (age 69)
- Lisa Arch born November 23, 1971 (age 54)
- Anne Archer born August 24, 1947 (age 79)
- Beverly Archer born July 19, 1948 (age 78)
- Melissa Archer born December 2, 1979 (age 46)
- Eve Arden (1908–1990)
- Ashley Argota born January 9, 1993 (age 33)
- Jillian Armenante born July 5, 1964 (age 62)
- Bess Armstrong born December 11, 1953 (age 72)
- Lucie Arnaz born July 17, 1951 (age 75)
- Jeannetta Arnette born July 29, 1954 (age 72)
- Tichina Arnold born June 28, 1969 (age 57)
- Alexis Arquette (1969–2016)
- Patricia Arquette born April 8, 1968 (age 58)
- Rosanna Arquette born August 10, 1959 (age 67)
- Lisa Arrindell born March 24, 1969 (age 57)
- Bea Arthur (1922–2009)
- Nina Arvesen born May 16, 1961 (age 65)
- Erica Ash (1977–2024)
- Ashanti born October 13, 1980 (age 46)
- Daphne Ashbrook born January 30, 1963 (age 63)
- Elizabeth Ashley born August 30, 1939 (age 87)
- Karan Ashley born September 28, 1975 (age 51)
- Jennifer Aspen born October 9, 1970 (age 56)
- Essence Atkins born February 7, 1972 (age 54)
- Jayne Atkinson born February 18, 1959 (age 67)
- Alana Austin born April 6, 1982 (age 44)
- Karen Austin born October 24, 1950 (age 76)
- Margaret Avery born January 20, 1944 (age 82)
- Shondrella Avery born April 26, 1971 (age 55)
- Reiko Aylesworth born December 9, 1972 (age 53)
- Leah Ayres born May 28, 1957 (age 69)
- Rochelle Aytes born May 17, 1976 (age 50)
- Valerie Azlynn born November 25, 1980 (age 45)
- Candice Azzara born May 18, 1945 (age 81)

== B ==
- Barbara Babcock born February 27, 1937 (age 89)
- Lauren Bacall (1924–2014)
- Morena Baccarin born June 2, 1979 (age 47)
- Catherine Bach born March 1, 1955 (age 71)
- Jillian Bach born April 27, 1973 (age 53)
- Pamela Bach (1963–2025)
- Hermione Baddeley (1906–1986)
- Vanessa Baden born September 8, 1985 (age 41)
- Jane Badler born December 31, 1953 (age 72)
- Lorri Bagley born August 5, 1973 (age 53)
- Katherine Bailess born April 24, 1980 (age 46)
- Chloe Bailey born July 1, 1998 (age 28)
- Halle Bailey born March 27, 2000 (age 26)
- Barbara Bain born September 13, 1931 (age 95)
- Robin Bain born February 12, 1980 (age 46)
- Diora Baird born April 6, 1983 (age 43)
- Maggie Baird born March 29, 1959 (age 67)
- Pamela Baird born April 6, 1945 (age 81)
- Sharon Baird born August 16, 1943 (age 83)
- Baiyu
- Amanda Baker born December 22, 1979 (age 46)
- Ann Baker (1930–2017)
- Becky Ann Baker born February 17, 1953 (age 73)
- Blanche Baker born December 20, 1956 (age 69)
- Diane Baker born February 25, 1938 (age 88)
- Kathy Baker born June 8, 1950 (age 76)
- LaVern Baker (1929–1997)
- Leigh-Allyn Baker born March 13, 1972 (age 54)
- Brenda Bakke born May 15, 1963 (age 63)
- Rebecca Balding (1948–2022)
- Fairuza Balk born May 21, 1974 (age 52)
- Lucille Ball (1911–1989)
- Kaye Ballard (1925–2019)
- Kimee Balmilero born December 13, 1979 (age 46)
- Anne Bancroft (1931–2005)
- Lisa Banes (1955–2021)
- Elizabeth Banks born February 10, 1974 (age 52)
- Tyra Banks born December 4, 1973 (age 52)
- Christine Baranski born May 2, 1952 (age 74)
- Olivia Barash born January 11, 1965 (age 61)
- Adrienne Barbeau born June 11, 1945 (age 81)
- Carol Barbee born May 22, 1959 (age 67)
- Andrea Barber born July 3, 1976 (age 50)
- Jenni Barber born July 22, 1983 (age 43)
- Jillian Barberie born September 26, 1966 (age 60)
- Sara Bareilles born December 7, 1979 (age 46)
- Ellen Barkin born April 16, 1954 (age 72)
- Joanna Barnes (1934–2022)
- Priscilla Barnes born December 7, 1954 (age 71)
- Anita Barone born September 25, 1964 (age 62)
- Judith Barcroft born July 6, 1942 (age 84)
- Hayley Barr born April 27, 1971 (age 55)
- Julia Barr born February 8, 1949 (age 77)
- Roseanne Barr born November 3, 1952 (age 74)
- Tara Lynne Barr born October 2, 1993 (age 33)
- Alice Barrett born December 19, 1956 (age 69)
- Majel Barrett (1932–2008)
- Nancy Barrett born October 5, 1941 (age 85)
- Barbara Barrie (1931–2026)
- Dana Barron born April 22, 1966 (age 60)
- Patricia Barry (1921–2016)
- Drew Barrymore born February 22, 1975 (age 51)
- Jayden Bartels born November 1, 2004 (age 22)
- Joanie Bartels born May 21, 1953 (age 73)
- Jessica Barth
- Lynsey Bartilson born July 1, 1983 (age 43)
- Bonnie Bartlett born June 20, 1929 (age 97)
- Robin Bartlett born April 22, 1951 (age 75)
- Mischa Barton born January 24, 1986 (age 40)
- Ella Jay Basco born September 7, 2006 (age 20)
- Toni Basil born September 22, 1943 (age 83)
- Kim Basinger born December 8, 1953 (age 72)
- Angela Bassett born August 16, 1958 (age 68)
- Brec Bassinger born May 25, 1999 (age 27)
- Justine Bateman born February 19, 1966 (age 60)
- Angelique Bates born December 1, 1980 (age 45)
- Kathy Bates born June 28, 1948 (age 78)
- Ryan Michelle Bathe born July 27, 1976 (age 50)
- Charita Bauer (1922–1985)
- Jaime Lyn Bauer born March 9, 1949 (age 77)
- Elizabeth Baur (1947–2017)
- Frances Bavier (1902–1989)
- Anne Baxter (1923–1985)
- Meredith Baxter born June 21, 1947 (age 79)
- Frances Bay (1919–2011)
- Susan Bay born March 16, 1943 (age 83)
- Vanessa Bayer born November 14, 1981 (age 45)
- Jennifer Beals born December 19, 1963 (age 62)
- Amanda Bearse born August 9, 1958 (age 68)
- Allyce Beasley born July 6, 1951 (age 75)
- Stephanie Beatriz born February 10, 1981 (age 45)
- Garcelle Beauvais born November 26, 1966 (age 59)
- Jenny Beck born August 3, 1974 (age 52)
- Kimberly Beck born January 9, 1956 (age 70)
- Melissa Beck born February 12, 1977 (age 49)
- Noelle Beck born December 14, 1967 (age 58)
- Roxanne Beckford born November 17, 1969 (age 57)
- Becky G born March 2, 1997 (age 29)
- Bonnie Bedelia born March 25, 1948 (age 78)
- Samantha Bee born October 25, 1969 (age 57)
- Leslie Bega born April 17, 1967 (age 59)
- Beth Behrs born December 26, 1985 (age 40)
- Barbara Bel Geddes (1922–2005)
- Shari Belafonte born September 22, 1954 (age 72)
- Christine Belford
- Anna Belknap born May 22, 1972 (age 54)
- Catherine Bell born August 14, 1968 (age 58)
- Emma Bell born December 17, 1986 (age 39)
- Felecia M. Bell born June 12, 1960 (age 66)
- Kristen Bell born July 18, 1980 (age 46)
- Lake Bell born March 24, 1979 (age 47)
- Lauralee Bell born December 22, 1968 (age 57)
- Diana Bellamy (1943–2001)
- Kathleen Beller born February 19, 1956 (age 70)
- Troian Bellisario born October 28, 1985 (age 41)
- Maria Bello born April 18, 1967 (age 59)
- Pamela Bellwood born June 26, 1951 (age 75)
- Bea Benaderet (1906–1968)
- Landry Bender born August 3, 2000 (age 26)
- Lourdes Benedicto born November 12, 1974 (age 52)
- Annette Bening born May 29, 1958 (age 68)
- Rhona Bennett born May 10, 1976 (age 50)
- Melissa Benoist born October 4, 1988 (age 38)
- Amber Benson born January 8, 1977 (age 49)
- Ashley Benson born December 18, 1989 (age 36)
- Jodi Benson born October 10, 1961 (age 65)
- Lucille Benson (1914–1984)
- Wendy Benson born July 8, 1971 (age 55)
- Julie Benz born May 1, 1972 (age 54)
- Blaze Berdahl born September 6, 1980 (age 46)
- Paris Berelc born December 29, 1998 (age 27)
- Gertrude Berg (1899–1966)
- Judith-Marie Bergan (1948–2016)
- Candice Bergen born May 9, 1946 (age 80)
- Frances Bergen (1923–2006)
- Polly Bergen (1930–2014)
- Kelli Berglund born February 9, 1996 (age 30)
- Ingrid Bergman (1915–1982)
- Jaime Bergman born September 23, 1975 (age 51)
- Elizabeth Berkley born July 28, 1974 (age 52)
- Julie Berman born November 3, 1983 (age 43)
- Julissa Bermudez born September 28, 1983 (age 43)
- Crystal Bernard born September 30, 1961 (age 65)
- Susan Bernard (1948–2019)
- Sandra Bernhard born June 6, 1955 (age 71)
- Elizabeth Berridge born May 2, 1962 (age 64)
- Halle Berry born August 14, 1966 (age 60)
- Valerie Bertinelli born April 23, 1960 (age 66)
- Bibi Besch (1942–1996)
- Martine Beswick born September 26, 1941 (age 85)
- Jaclyn Betham born July 4, 1986 (age 40)
- Beyoncé born September 4, 1981 (age 45)
- Mayim Bialik born December 12, 1975 (age 50)
- Leslie Bibb born November 17, 1973 (age 53)
- Camren Bicondova born May 22, 1999 (age 27)
- Hailey Bieber born November 22, 1996 (age 29)
- Jessica Biel born March 3, 1982 (age 44)
- Sissy Biggers born July 3, 1957 (age 69)
- Alexandra Billings born March 28, 1962 (age 64)
- Barbara Billingsley (1915–2010)
- Jennifer Billingsley
- Rachel Bilson born August 25, 1981 (age 45)
- Traci Bingham born January 13, 1968 (age 58)
- Thora Birch born March 11, 1982 (age 44)
- Billie Bird (1908–2002)
- Kelly Bishop born February 28, 1944 (age 82)
- Meredith Bishop born January 15, 1976 (age 50)
- Josie Bissett born August 5, 1970 (age 56)
- Nadia Bjorlin born August 2, 1980 (age 46)
- Karen Black (1939–2013)
- Sofia Black-D'Elia born December 24, 1991 (age 34)
- Nina Blackwood born September 12, 1955 (age 71)
- Linda Blair born January 22, 1959 (age 67)
- Pamela Blair (1949–2023)
- Patricia Blair (1933–2013)
- Selma Blair born June 23, 1972 (age 54)
- Amanda Blake (1929–1989)
- Madge Blake (1899–1969)
- Whitney Blake (1926–2002)
- Rachel Blakely born July 28, 1968 (age 58)
- Susan Blakely born September 7, 1948 (age 78)
- Ronee Blakley born August 24, 1945 (age 81)
- Jolene Blalock born March 5, 1975 (age 51)
- Jennifer Blanc
- Rachel Blanchard born March 19, 1976 (age 50)
- Tammy Blanchard born December 14, 1976 (age 49)
- Cate Blanchett born May 14, 1969 (age 57)
- Rosa Blasi born December 19, 1972 (age 53)
- Alexis Bledel born September 16, 1981 (age 45)
- Tempestt Bledsoe born August 1, 1973 (age 53)
- Yasmine Bleeth born June 14, 1968 (age 58)
- Mary J. Blige born January 11, 1971 (age 55)
- Lindsay Bloom
- Rachel Bloom born April 3, 1987 (age 39)
- Vail Bloom
- Lisa Blount (1957–2010)
- Susan Blu
- Heidi Bohay born December 15, 1959 (age 66)
- Corinne Bohrer born October 18, 1958 (age 68)
- Lisa Bonet born November 16, 1967 (age 59)
- Lesley Boone born February 25, 1968 (age 58)
- Megan Boone born April 29, 1983 (age 43)
- Mika Boorem born August 18, 1987 (age 39)
- Shirley Booth (1898–1992)
- Alex Borstein born February 15, 1971 (age 55)
- Lucy Boryer born February 14, 1966 (age 60)
- Samantha Boscarino born December 26, 1994 (age 31)
- Barbara Bosson (1939–2023)
- Rachel Boston born May 9, 1982 (age 44)
- Kate Bosworth born January 2, 1983 (age 43)
- Katrina Bowden born September 19, 1988 (age 38)
- Lilan Bowden born September 1, 1985 (age 41)
- Andrea Bowen born March 4, 1990 (age 36)
- Clare Bowen born May 12, 1984 (age 42)
- Julie Bowen born March 3, 1970 (age 56)
- April Bowlby born July 30, 1980 (age 46)
- Jessica Bowman born November 26, 1980 (age 45)
- Jenna Boyd born March 4, 1993 (age 33)
- Nikki Boyer born July 22, 1975 (age 51)
- Lara Flynn Boyle born March 24, 1970 (age 56)
- Lucy Boynton born January 17, 1994 (age 32)
- Elizabeth Bracco
- Lorraine Bracco born October 2, 1954 (age 72)
- Kathleen Bradley
- Sônia Braga born June 8, 1950 (age 76)
- Vanessa Branch born March 21, 1973 (age 53)
- Alicia Brandt
- Betsy Brandt born March 14, 1973 (age 53)
- Laura Branigan (1952–2004)
- Brigid Brannagh born August 3, 1972 (age 54)
- Da Brat born April 14, 1974 (age 52)
- Tamara Braun born April 18, 1971 (age 55)
- Ciara Bravo born March 18, 1997 (age 29)
- Stephanie Braxton born December 11, 1944 (age 81)
- Tamar Braxton born March 17, 1977 (age 49)
- Trina Braxton born December 3, 1974 (age 51)
- Deanne Bray born May 14, 1971 (age 55)
- Alexandra Breckenridge May 15, 1982 (age 44)
- Laura Breckenridge born August 22, 1983 (age 43)
- Tracey E. Bregman born May 29, 1963 (age 63)
- Eileen Brennan (1932–2013)
- Amy Brenneman born June 22, 1964 (age 62)
- Ashleigh Brewer born December 9, 1990 (age 35)
- Jordana Brewster born April 26, 1980 (age 46)
- Paget Brewster born March 10, 1969 (age 57)
- Angelica Bridges born November 20, 1970 (age 56)
- Chloe Bridges born December 27, 1991 (age 34)
- Alison Brie born December 29, 1982 (age 43)
- Christie Brinkley born February 2, 1954 (age 72)
- Danielle Brisebois born June 28, 1969 (age 57)
- Tiffany Brissette born December 26, 1974 (age 51)
- Morgan Brittany born December 5, 1951 (age 74)
- Barbara Britton (1920–1980)
- Connie Britton born March 6, 1967 (age 59)
- Pamela Britton (1923–1974)
- Kara Brock born March 29, 1974 (age 52)
- Beth Broderick born March 24, 1959 (age 67)
- Lois Bromfield
- Jayne Brook born September 16, 1960 (age 66)
- Aimee Brooks born November 19, 1974 (age 52)
- Angelle Brooks
- Danielle Brooks born September 17, 1989 (age 37)
- Deanna Brooks born April 30, 1974 (age 52)
- Elisabeth Brooks (1951–1997)
- Golden Brooks December 1, 1970 (age 55)
- Kimberly Brooks
- Blair Brown born April 23, 1946 (age 80)
- Bobbie Brown born October 7, 1969 (age 57)
- Brianna Brown born October 2, 1979 (age 47)
- Candace Brown born June 15, 1980 (age 46)
- Candy Brown born August 19, 1958 (age 68)
- Charnele Brown born October 30, 1960 (age 66)
- Chelsea Brown (1942–2017)
- Downtown Julie Brown
- Julie Brown born August 31, 1958 (age 68)
- Kimberlin Brown born June 29, 1961 (age 65)
- Kimberly J. Brown born November 16, 1984 (age 42)
- Olivia Brown born April 10, 1960 (age 66)
- Pat Crawford Brown (1929–2019)
- Rhyon Nicole Brown born October 6, 1992 (age 34)
- Sarah Joy Brown born February 18, 1975 (age 51)
- Susan Brown (1932–2018)
- Yvette Nicole Brown born August 12, 1971 (age 55)
- Logan Browning born June 9, 1989 (age 37)
- Agnes Bruckner born August 16, 1985 (age 41)
- Amy Bruckner born March 28, 1991 (age 35)
- Ellen Bry born February 13, 1951 (age 75)
- Sabrina Bryan born September 16, 1984 (age 42)
- Clara Bryant born February 7, 1985 (age 41)
- Joy Bryant born October 18, 1974 (age 52)
- Karyn Bryant born December 23, 1968 (age 57)
- Jensen Buchanan born July 18, 1962 (age 64)
- Tara Buck born March 16, 1975 (age 51)
- Betty Buckley born July 3, 1947 (age 79)
- Rebecca Budig born June 26, 1973 (age 53)
- Joyce Bulifant born December 16, 1937 (age 88)
- Sandra Bullock born July 26, 1964 (age 62)
- Kylie Bunbury born January 30, 1989 (age 37)
- Brooke Bundy born August 8, 1944 (age 82)
- Laura Bell Bundy born April 10, 1981 (age 45)
- Cara Buono born March 1, 1971 (age 55)
- Candace Cameron Bure born April 6, 1976 (age 50)
- Brooke Burke born September 8, 1971 (age 55)
- Delta Burke born July 30, 1956 (age 70)
- Michelle Burke born November 30, 1970 (age 55)
- Carol Burnett born April 26, 1933 (age 93)
- Molly Burnett born April 23, 1988 (age 38)
- Olivia Burnette born March 24, 1977 (age 49)
- Brooke Burns born March 16, 1978 (age 48)
- Catherine Burns (1945–2019)
- Catherine Lloyd Burns
- Maryedith Burrell born May 20, 1952 (age 74)
- Nakia Burrise born October 21, 1974 (age 52)
- Hedy Burress born October 3, 1973 (age 53)
- Saffron Burrows born October 22, 1972 (age 54)
- Kandi Burruss born May 17, 1976 (age 50)
- Ellen Burstyn born December 7, 1932 (age 93)
- Hilarie Burton born July 1, 1982 (age 44)
- Sophia Bush born July 8, 1982 (age 44)
- Brett Butler born January 30, 1958 (age 68)
- Yancy Butler born July 2, 1970 (age 56)
- Sarah G. Buxton born March 23, 1965 (age 61)
- Ruth Buzzi (1936–2025)
- Grace Byers born July 26, 1984 (age 42)
- Amanda Bynes born April 3, 1986 (age 40)
- Martha Byrne born December 23, 1969 (age 56)
- Darcy Rose Byrnes born November 4, 1998 (age 28)
- Jean Byron (1925–2006)

== C ==
- Mary Cadorette born March 31, 1957 (age 69)
- Erin Cahill born January 4, 1980 (age 46)
- Paula Cale born June 2, 1970 (age 56)
- Monica Calhoun born July 29, 1971 (age 55)
- K Callan born January 9, 1936 (age 90)
- Vanessa Bell Calloway born March 20, 1957 (age 69)
- Sadie Calvano born April 8, 1997 (age 29)
- Dove Cameron born January 15, 1996 (age 30)
- Joanna Cameron (1948–2021)
- Colleen Camp born June 7, 1953 (age 73)
- Christa Campbell born December 7, 1972 (age 53)
- Danielle Campbell born January 30, 1995 (age 31)
- Maia Campbell born November 26, 1976 (age 49)
- Neve Campbell born October 3, 1973 (age 53)
- Tisha Campbell born October 13, 1968 (age 58)
- Maria Canals-Barrera born September 28, 1966 (age 60)
- Lisa Canning born September 7, 1966 (age 60)
- Sara Canning born July 14, 1987 (age 39)
- Dyan Cannon born January 4, 1937 (age 89)
- Katherine Cannon born September 6, 1953 (age 73)
- Kay Cannon born August 22, 1974 (age 52)
- Francesca Capaldi born June 8, 2004 (age 22)
- Virginia Capers (1925–2004)
- Lizzy Caplan born June 30, 1982 (age 44)
- Twink Caplan born December 25, 1947 (age 78)
- Jessica Capshaw born August 9, 1976 (age 50)
- Kate Capshaw born November 3, 1953 (age 73)
- Irene Cara (1959–2022)
- Linda Cardellini born June 25, 1975 (age 51)
- D'Arcy Carden born January 4, 1980 (age 46)
- Cardi B born October 11, 1992 (age 34)
- Clare Carey born June 11, 1967 (age 59)
- Mariah Carey born March 27, 1969 (age 57)
- Amy Carlson born July 7, 1968 (age 58)
- Karen Carlson born January 15, 1945 (age 81)
- Kelly Carlson born February 17, 1976 (age 50)
- Linda Carlson (1945–2021)
- Charisma Carpenter born July 23, 1970 (age 56)
- Sabrina Carpenter born May 11, 1999 (age 27)
- Thelma Carpenter (1922–1997)
- Darleen Carr born December 12, 1950 (age 75)
- Ever Carradine born August 6, 1974 (age 52)
- Barbara Carrera
- Tia Carrere born January 2, 1967 (age 59)
- Diahann Carroll (1935–2019)
- Pat Carroll (1927–2022)
- Crystal Carson born June 24, 1967 (age 59)
- Jean Carson (1923–2005)
- Lisa Nicole Carson born July 12, 1969 (age 57)
- Sofia Carson born April 10, 1993 (age 33)
- Victoria Cartagena born February 14, 1985 (age 41)
- Dixie Carter (1939–2010)
- Lynda Carter born July 24, 1951 (age 75)
- Nell Carter (1948–2003)
- Gabrielle Carteris born January 2, 1961 (age 65)
- Nancy Cartwright born October 25, 1957 (age 69)
- Veronica Cartwright born April 20, 1949 (age 77)
- Mary Carver (1924–2013)
- Sharon Case born February 9, 1971 (age 55)
- Rosalind Cash (1938–1995)
- Peggy Cass (1924–1999)
- Joanna Cassidy born August 2, 1944 (age 82)
- Tricia Cast born November 16, 1966 (age 60)
- Peggie Castle (1927–1973)
- Shanley Caswell born December 3, 1991 (age 34)
- Adriana Cataño
- Catrina born April 19, 1986 (age 40)
- Mary Jo Catlett born September 2, 1938 (age 88)
- Kim Cattrall born August 21, 1956 (age 70)
- Emma Caulfield born April 8, 1973 (age 53)
- Joan Caulfield (1922–1991)
- Kristin Cavallari born January 5, 1987 (age 39)
- Megan Cavanagh born November 8, 1960 (age 66)
- Christine Cavanaugh (1963–2014)
- Cha Cha born February 12, 1980 (age 46)
- Lacey Chabert born November 30, 1982 (age 43)
- Sarah Chalke born August 27, 1976 (age 50)
- Christina Chambers born October 24, 1969 (age 57)
- Elizabeth Chambers born August 18, 1982 (age 44)
- Erin Chambers born September 24, 1979 (age 47)
- Jacki R. Chan born December 2, 1980 (age 45)
- JuJu Chan
- Michele B. Chan
- Christina Chang born June 29, 1971 (age 55)
- Carol Channing (1921–2019)
- Stockard Channing born February 13, 1944 (age 82)
- Rosalind Chao born September 23, 1957 (age 69)
- Judith Chapman born November 15, 1951 (age 75)
- Lanei Chapman born January 23, 1973 (age 53)
- Crystal Chappell born August 4, 1965 (age 61)
- Leslie Charleson (1945–2025)
- Charo
- Melanie Chartoff born December 15, 1948 (age 77)
- Daveigh Chase (1990–2026)
- Molly Cheek born March 2, 1950 (age 76)
- Kristin Chenoweth born July 24, 1968 (age 58)
- Cher born May 20, 1946 (age 80)
- Lois Chiles born April 15, 1947 (age 79)
- Margaret Cho born December 5, 1968 (age 57)
- Rae Dawn Chong born February 28, 1961 (age 65)
- Robbi Chong born May 28, 1965 (age 61)
- Priyanka Chopra born July 18, 1982 (age 44)
- Claudia Christian born August 10, 1965 (age 61)
- Robin Christopher born June 18, 1965 (age 61)
- Danielle Chuchran born June 9, 1993 (age 33)
- Marguerite Churchill (1910–2000)
- Jamie Chung born April 10, 1983 (age 43)
- Chyna (1969–2016)
- Cree Cicchino born May 9, 2002 (age 24)
- Natalia Cigliuti born September 6, 1978 (age 48)
- Ashley Monique Clark born December 1, 1988 (age 37)
- Candy Clark born June 20, 1947 (age 79)
- Christie Clark born December 13, 1973 (age 52)
- Doran Clark born August 8, 1954 (age 72)
- Melinda Clarke born April 24, 1969 (age 57)
- Sarah Clarke born February 16, 1972 (age 54)
- Kelly Clarkson born April 24, 1982 (age 44)
- Lana Clarkson (1962–2003)
- Patricia Clarkson born December 29, 1959 (age 66)
- Jill Clayburgh (1944–2010)
- Amanda Clayton born October 24, 1981 (age 45)
- Jamie Clayton born January 15, 1978 (age 48)
- Ellen Cleghorne born November 29, 1965 (age 60)
- Kiersey Clemons born December 17, 1993 (age 32)
- Odessa Cleveland
- Rosemary Clooney (1928–2002)
- Glenn Close born March 19, 1947 (age 79)
- Imogene Coca (1908–2001)
- Annalisa Cochrane born June 21, 1996 (age 30)
- Claire Coffee born April 14, 1980 (age 46)
- Kelly Coffield Park born January 19, 1962 (age 64)
- Mindy Cohn born May 20, 1966 (age 60)
- Taylor Cole born April 29, 1984 (age 42)
- Tina Cole born August 4, 1943 (age 83)
- Monique Coleman born November 13, 1980 (age 46)
- Robin Coleman born March 30, 1973 (age 53)
- Kim Coles born January 11, 1962 (age 64)
- Margaret Colin born May 26, 1958 (age 68)
- Joan Collins born May 23, 1933 (age 93)
- Mo Collins born July 7, 1965 (age 61)
- Tru Collins
- Holly Marie Combs born December 3, 1973 (age 52)
- Darlene Conley (1934–2007)
- Michaela Conlin born June 9, 1978 (age 48)
- Didi Conn born July 13, 1951 (age 75)
- Jennifer Connelly born December 12, 1970 (age 55)
- Kristen Connolly born July 12, 1980 (age 46)
- Lauren Conrad born February 1, 1986 (age 40)
- Frances Conroy born March 15, 1953 (age 73)
- Angell Conwell born August 2, 1983 (age 43)
- A. J. Cook born July 22, 1978 (age 48)
- Rachael Leigh Cook born October 4, 1979 (age 47)
- Jennifer Coolidge born August 28, 1961 (age 65)
- Calico Cooper born May 19, 1981 (age 45)
- Felisha Cooper born September 8, 1988 (age 38)
- Jeanne Cooper (1928–2013)
- Teri Copley born May 10, 1961 (age 65)
- Alicia Coppola born April 12, 1968 (age 58)
- Gretchen Corbett born August 13, 1945 (age 81)
- Ellen Corby (1911–1999)
- Maddie Corman born August 15, 1970 (age 56)
- Lydia Cornell born July 23, 1953 (age 73)
- Miranda Cosgrove born May 14, 1993 (age 33)
- Eliza Coupe born April 6, 1981 (age 45)
- Courteney Cox born June 15, 1964 (age 62)
- Laverne Cox born May 29, 1972 (age 54)
- Nikki Cox born June 2, 1978 (age 48)
- Yvonne Craig (1937–2015)
- Christina Crawford born June 11, 1939 (age 87)
- Cindy Crawford born February 20, 1966 (age 60)
- Rachael Crawford born 1969
- Leanna Creel born August 27, 1970 (age 56)
- Wendy Crewson born May 9, 1956 (age 70)
- Nancy Criss
- Cathy Lee Crosby born December 2, 1944 (age 81)
- Denise Crosby born November 24, 1957 (age 68)
- Mary Crosby born September 14, 1959 (age 67)
- Marcia Cross born March 25, 1962 (age 64)
- Suzanne Crough (1963–2015)
- Lindsay Crouse born May 12, 1948 (age 78)
- Ashley Crow born August 25, 1960 (age 66)
- Rachel Crow born January 23, 1998 (age 28)
- Sheryl Crow born February 11, 1962 (age 64)
- Tonya Crowe born January 24, 1971 (age 55)
- Macey Cruthird born November 12, 1992 (age 34)
- Penélope Cruz born April 28, 1974 (age 52)
- Valerie Cruz born July 18, 1976 (age 50)
- Melinda Culea born May 5, 1955 (age 71)
- Zara Cully (1892–1978)
- Molly Culver born July 18, 1968 (age 58)
- Erin Cummings born July 19, 1977 (age 49)
- Whitney Cummings born September 4, 1982 (age 44)
- Kaley Cuoco born November 30, 1985 (age 40)
- Marianne Curan born May 12, 1961 (age 65)
- Piper Curda born August 16, 1997 (age 29)
- Kyliegh Curran born December 10, 2005 (age 20)
- Ayesha Curry born March 23, 1989 (age 37)
- Jane Curtin born September 6, 1947 (age 79)
- Jamie Lee Curtis born November 22, 1958 (age 67)
- Ann Cusack born May 22, 1961 (age 65)
- Joan Cusack born October 11, 1962 (age 64)
- Lise Cutter born July 31, 1959 (age 67)
- Brandi Cyrus born May 26, 1987 (age 39)
- Miley Cyrus born November 23, 1992 (age 33)
- Noah Cyrus born January 8, 2000 (age 26)

== D ==
- Olivia d'Abo born January 22, 1969 (age 57)
- Beverly D'Angelo born November 15, 1951 (age 75)
- Patti D'Arbanville born May 25, 1951 (age 75)
- Donna D'Errico born March 30, 1968 (age 58)
- Shae D'lyn born November 24, 1963 (age 62)
- Arlene Dahl (1925–2021)
- Irene Dailey (1920–2008)
- E. G. Daily born September 11, 1961 (age 65)
- Nadia Dajani born December 26, 1965 (age 60)
- Abby Dalton (1932–2020)
- Tyne Daly born February 21, 1946 (age 80)
- Cathryn Damon (1930–1987)
- Claire Danes born April 12, 1979 (age 47)
- Shera Danese born October 9, 1949 (age 77)
- Brittany Daniel born March 17, 1976 (age 50)
- Cynthia Daniel born March 17, 1976 (age 50)
- Erin Daniels born October 9, 1973 (age 53)
- Sarah E. Daniels born August 1, 1989 (age 37)
- Blythe Danner born February 3, 1943 (age 83)
- Sybil Danning born May 24, 1952 (age 74)
- Linda Dano born May 12, 1943 (age 83)
- Patrika Darbo born April 6, 1948 (age 78)
- Kim Darby born July 8, 1947 (age 79)
- Jennifer Darling born June 19, 1946 (age 80)
- Joan Darling born April 14, 1935 (age 91)
- Cynthia Darlow born June 13, 1949 (age 77)
- Lisa Darr born April 21, 1963 (age 63)
- Stacey Dash born January 20, 1967 (age 59)
- Kristin Dattilo born November 30, 1970 (age 55)
- Alexa Davalos born May 28, 1982 (age 44)
- Elyssa Davalos born May 30, 1959 (age 67)
- Amy Davidson born September 15, 1979 (age 47)
- Eileen Davidson born June 15, 1959 (age 67)
- Embeth Davidtz born August 11, 1965 (age 61)
- Shanésia Davis-Williams born September 30, 1966 (age 60)
- Ann B. Davis (1926–2014)
- Geena Davis born January 21, 1976 (age 50)
- Hope Davis born March 23, 1964 (age 62)
- Joan Davis (1907–1961)
- Josie Davis born January 16, 1973 (age 53)
- Kristin Davis born February 23, 1965 (age 61)
- Paige Davis born October 15, 1969 (age 57)
- Suzanne Davis born February 10, 1974 (age 52)
- Viola Davis born August 11, 1965 (age 61)
- Pam Dawber born October 18, 1951 (age 75)
- Portia Dawson born August 2, 1971 (age 55)
- Rosario Dawson born May 9, 1979 (age 47)
- Roxann Dawson born September 11, 1964 (age 62)
- Doris Day (1922–2019)
- Yvonne De Carlo (1922–2007)
- Wanda De Jesus born August 26, 1958 (age 68)
- Alana de la Garza born June 18, 1976 (age 50)
- Madison De La Garza born December 28, 2001 (age 24)
- Drea de Matteo born January 19, 1972 (age 54)
- Rebecca De Mornay born August 29, 1959 (age 67)
- Cote de Pablo born November 12, 1979 (age 47)
- Emilie de Ravin born December 27, 1981 (age 44)
- Portia de Rossi born January 31, 1973 (age 53)
- Melissa De Sousa born September 25, 1967 (age 59)
- Jo de Winter (1921–2016)
- Erin Dean born October 18, 1980 (age 46)
- Kristinia DeBarge born March 8, 1990 (age 36)
- Rosemary DeCamp (1910–2001)
- Ruby Dee (1922–2014)
- Sandra Dee (1942–2005)
- Ellen DeGeneres born January 26, 1958 (age 68)
- Kim Delaney born November 29, 1961 (age 64)
- Diane Delano born January 29, 1957 (age 69)
- Dana Delany born March 13, 1956 (age 70)
- Idalis DeLeón born June 15, 1969 (age 57)
- Grey DeLisle born August 24, 1973 (age 53)
- Cara DeLizia born April 10, 1984 (age 42)
- Nikki DeLoach born September 9, 1979 (age 47)
- Dana DeLorenzo born January 1, 1982 (age 44)
- Jude Demorest born March 11, 1992 (age 34)
- Lori Beth Denberg born February 2, 1976 (age 50)
- Lydie Denier born April 15, 1964 (age 62)
- Kat Dennings born June 13, 1986 (age 40)
- Gabrielle Dennis born October 19, 1978 (age 48)
- Sandy Dennis (1937–1992)
- Bonnie Dennison born February 15, 1989 (age 37)
- Kassie DePaiva born March 21, 1961 (age 65)
- Marietta DePrima born May 3, 1964 (age 62)
- Bo Derek born November 20, 1956 (age 70)
- Laura Dern born February 10, 1967 (age 59)
- Emily Deschanel born October 11, 1976 (age 50)
- Zooey Deschanel born January 17, 1980 (age 46)
- Rosanna DeSoto born September 2, 1950 (age 76)
- Natalie Desselle-Reid (1967–2020)
- Ryan Destiny born January 8, 1995 (age 31)
- Zoey Deutch born November 10, 1994 (age 32)
- Patti Deutsch (1943–2017)
- Daniella Deutscher born October 4, 1975 (age 51)
- Paula Devicq
- Loretta Devine born August 21, 1949 (age 77)
- Joyce DeWitt born April 23, 1949 (age 77)
- Rosemarie DeWitt born October 26, 1971 (age 55)
- Noureen DeWulf
- Susan Dey born December 10, 1952 (age 73)
- Caroline Dhavernas born May 15, 1978 (age 48)
- Selma Diamond (1920–1985)
- Skin Diamond born February 18, 1987 (age 39)
- Alyssa Diaz born September 7, 1985 (age 41)
- Cameron Diaz born August 30, 1972 (age 54)
- Melonie Diaz born April 25, 1984 (age 42)
- Jessica DiCicco born June 10, 1980 (age 46)
- Angie Dickinson born September 30, 1931 (age 95)
- Victoria Dillard born September 20, 1967 (age 59)
- Phyllis Diller (1917–2012)
- Brooke Dillman born August 22, 1966 (age 60)
- Denny Dillon born May 18, 1951 (age 75)
- Melinda Dillon (1939–2023)
- Donna Dixon born July 20, 1957 (age 69)
- Shannen Doherty born April 12, 1971 (age 55)
- Elinor Donahue born April 19, 1937 (age 89)
- Patricia Donahue (1925–2012)
- Ami Dolenz born January 8, 1969 (age 57)
- Meg Donnelly born July 25, 2000 (age 26)
- Amanda Donohoe born June 29, 1962 (age 64)
- Elisa Donovan born February 3, 1979 (age 47)
- Ann Doran (1911–2000)
- Kristin dos Santos born February 24, 1975 (age 51)
- Kaitlin Doubleday born July 19, 1984 (age 42)
- Portia Doubleday born June 22, 1988 (age 38)
- Donna Douglas (1932–2015)
- Illeana Douglas born July 25, 1961 (age 65)
- Suzzanne Douglas (1957–2021)
- Amy Douglass (1902–1980)
- Robyn Douglass born June 21, 1953 (age 73)
- Lesley-Anne Down born March 17, 1954 (age 72)
- Roma Downey born May 6, 1960 (age 66)
- Courtnee Draper born April 24, 1985 (age 41)
- Jesse Draper born January 5, 1986 (age 40)
- Polly Draper born June 15, 1955 (age 71)
- Rachel Dratch born February 22, 1966 (age 60)
- Fran Drescher born September 30, 1957 (age 69)
- Sarah Drew born October 1, 1980 (age 46)
- Minnie Driver born January 31, 1970 (age 56)
- Denise DuBarry (1956–2019)
- Ja'Net DuBois (1932–2020)
- Heather Dubrow born January 5, 1969 (age 57)
- Nicole Dubuc born November 6, 1978 (age 48)
- Haylie Duff born February 19, 1985 (age 41)
- Hilary Duff born September 28, 1987 (age 39)
- Julia Duffy born June 27, 1951 (age 75)
- Karen Duffy born May 23, 1962 (age 64)
- Olympia Dukakis (1931–2021)
- Patty Duke (1946–2016)
- Faye Dunaway born January 14, 1941 (age 85)
- Sandy Duncan born February 20, 1946 (age 80)
- Merrin Dungey born August 6, 1971 (age 55)
- Lena Dunham born May 13, 1986 (age 40)
- Nora Dunn born April 29, 1952 (age 74)
- Debbe Dunning born July 11, 1966 (age 60)
- Kirsten Dunst born April 30, 1982 (age 44)
- Eliza Dushku born December 30, 1980 (age 45)
- Nancy Dussault born June 30, 1936 (age 90)
- Clea DuVall born September 25, 1977 (age 49)
- Shelley Duvall (1949–2024)

== E ==
- Bobbie Eakes born July 25, 1961 (age 65)
- Leslie Easterbrook born July 29, 1949 (age 77)
- Dina Eastwood born July 11, 1965 (age 61)
- Christine Ebersole born February 21, 1953 (age 73)
- Megalyn Echikunwoke born May 28, 1983 (age 43)
- Lisa Edelstein born May 21, 1967 (age 59)
- Barbara Eden born August 23, 1931 (age 95)
- Sonya Eddy (1967–2022)
- Hilary Edson born October 17, 1962 (age 64)
- Gail Edwards born September 27, 1952 (age 74)
- Reign Edwards born December 1, 1996 (age 29)
- Stacy Edwards born March 4, 1965 (age 61)
- Stephanie Edwards born November 8, 1943 (age 83)
- Melissa Claire Egan born September 28, 1981 (age 45)
- Susan Egan born February 18, 1970 (age 56)
- Nicole Eggert born January 13, 1972 (age 54)
- Gretchen Egolf born September 9, 1973 (age 53)
- Jill Eikenberry born January 21, 1947 (age 79)
- Lisa Eilbacher born May 5, 1956 (age 70)
- Carmen Electra born April 20, 1972 (age 54)
- Judyann Elder born August 18, 1948 (age 78)
- Erika Eleniak born September 29, 1969 (age 57)
- Jenna Elfman born September 30, 1971 (age 55)
- Kimberly Elise born April 17, 1967 (age 59)
- Jane Elliot born January 17, 1947 (age 79)
- Abby Elliott born June 16, 1987 (age 39)
- Alecia Elliott born December 25, 1982 (age 43)
- Patricia Elliott (1938–2015)
- Aunjanue Ellis born February 6, 1969 (age 57)
- Andrea Elson born March 6, 1969 (age 57)
- Linda Emond born May 25, 1959 (age 67)
- Georgia Engel (1948–2019)
- Ellia English born March 26, 1960 (age 66)
- Jena Engstrom born June 30, 1942 (age 84)
- Joy Enriquez born June 6, 1978 (age 48)
- Molly Ephraim born May 22, 1986 (age 40)
- Kathryn Erbe born July 5, 1965 (age 61)
- Audrey Esparza born March 4, 1986 (age 40)
- Tiffany Espensen born February 10, 1999 (age 27)
- Jennifer Esposito born April 11, 1973 (age 53)
- Susie Essman born May 31, 1955 (age 71)
- Christine Estabrook born September 13, 1952 (age 74)
- Renée Estevez born April 2, 1967 (age 59)
- Scarlett Estevez born December 4, 2007 (age 18)
- Andrea Evans (1957–2023)
- Judi Evans born July 12, 1964 (age 62)
- Linda Evans born November 18, 1942 (age 84)
- Mary Beth Evans born March 7, 1961 (age 65)
- Eve born November 10, 1978 (age 48)
- Nancy Everhard born November 30, 1957 (age 68)
- Angie Everhart born September 7, 1969 (age 57)
- Bridget Everett born April 21, 1972 (age 54)
- Corinna Everson born January 4, 1958 (age 68)
- Briana Evigan born October 23, 1986 (age 40)
- Vanessa Lee Evigan born March 18, 1981 (age 45)
- Kathy Evison born January 16, 1963 (age 63)

== F ==
- Shelley Fabares (1944–2026)
- Nanette Fabray (1920–2018)
- Morgan Fairchild born February 3, 1950 (age 76)
- Sandy Faison born September 16, 1950 (age 76)
- Edie Falco born July 5, 1963 (age 63)
- Lola Falana born September 11, 1942 (age 84)
- Dakota Fanning born February 23, 1994 (age 32)
- Elle Fanning born April 9, 1998 (age 28)
- Fantasia born June 30, 1984 (age 42)
- Stephanie Faracy born January 1, 1952 (age 74)
- Debrah Farentino born September 30, 1959 (age 67)
- Anna Faris born November 29, 1976 (age 49)
- Frances Farmer (1913–1970)
- Taissa Farmiga born August 17, 1994 (age 32)
- Diane Farr born September 7, 1969 (age 57)
- Felicia Farr born October 4, 1932 (age 94)
- Terry Farrell born November 19, 1963 (age 63)
- Mia Farrow born February 9, 1945 (age 81)
- Lucy Faust born May 12, 1986 (age 40)
- Farrah Fawcett (1947–2009)
- Meagen Fay
- Melinda O. Fee (1942–2020)
- Barbara Feldon born March 12, 1933 (age 93)
- Tamara Feldman born December 5, 1980 (age 45)
- Lindsay Felton born December 4, 1984 (age 41)
- Sherilyn Fenn born February 1, 1965 (age 61)
- Fergie born March 27, 1975 (age 51)
- Vanessa Ferlito born December 28, 1977 (age 48)
- Conchata Ferrell (1943–2020)
- America Ferrera born April 18, 1984 (age 42)
- Peggy Feury (1924–1985)
- Tina Fey born May 18, 1970 (age 56)
- Chelsea Field
- Sally Field born November 6, 1946 (age 80)
- Chip Fields
- Kim Fields born May 12, 1969 (age 57)
- Hala Finley born May 18, 2009 (age 17)
- Ashley Fink born November 20, 1986 (age 40)
- Katie Finneran born January 22, 1971 (age 55)
- Jennifer Finnigan born August 22, 1979 (age 47)
- Fiona born September 13, 1961 (age 65)
- Jenna Fischer born March 7, 1974 (age 52)
- Danielle Fishel born May 5, 1981 (age 45)
- Carrie Fisher (1956–2016)
- Frances Fisher born May 11, 1952 (age 74)
- Gail Fisher (1935–2000)
- Joely Fisher born October 29, 1967 (age 59)
- Tricia Leigh Fisher born December 26, 1968 (age 57)
- Schuyler Fisk born July 8, 1982 (age 44)
- Fannie Flagg born September 21, 1944 (age 82)
- Fionnula Flanagan born December 10, 1941 (age 84)
- Kate Flannery born June 10, 1964 (age 62)
- Susan Flannery born July 31, 1939 (age 87)
- Maureen Flannigan born December 30, 1972 (age 53)
- Jill Flint born November 25, 1977 (age 48)
- Lucy Lee Flippin born July 23, 1943 (age 83)
- Calista Flockhart born November 11, 1964 (age 62)
- Ann Flood (1932–2022)
- Gennifer Flowers born January 24, 1950 (age 76)
- Darlanne Fluegel (1953–2017)
- Colleen Flynn
- Clare Foley born September 25, 2001 (age 25)
- Ellen Foley born June 5, 1951 (age 75)
- Megan Follows born March 14, 1968 (age 58)
- Jane Fonda born December 21, 1937 (age 88)
- Lyndsy Fonseca born January 7, 1987 (age 39)
- Michelle Forbes born January 8, 1965 (age 61)
- Bette Ford born June 24, 1927 (age 99)
- Camille Ford born October 1, 1981 (age 45)
- Candy Ford
- Clementine Ford born June 29, 1979 (age 47)
- Constance Ford (1923–1993)
- Faith Ford born September 14, 1964 (age 62)
- Ami Foster born August 5, 1975 (age 51)
- Jodie Foster born November 19, 1962 (age 64)
- Kimberly Foster born July 6, 1961 (age 65)
- Meg Foster born May 10, 1948 (age 78)
- Crystal R. Fox born January 1, 1964 (age 62)
- Jorja Fox born July 7, 1968 (age 58)
- Megan Fox born May 16, 1986 (age 40)
- Vivica A. Fox born July 30, 1964 (age 62)
- Jaimee Foxworth born December 17, 1979 (age 46)
- Corinne Foxx born February 15, 1994 (age 32)
- Anne Francis (1930–2011)
- Connie Francis (1937–2025)
- Genie Francis born May 26, 1962 (age 64)
- Melissa Francis born December 12, 1972 (age 53)
- Bonnie Franklin (1944–2013)
- Mary Frann (1943–1998)
- Adrienne Frantz born June 7, 1978 (age 48)
- Cassidy Freeman born April 22, 1982 (age 44)
- Deena Freeman born February 11, 1956 (age 70)
- Jennifer Freeman born October 20, 1985 (age 41)
- Kathleen Freeman (1923–2001)
- Yvette Freeman born October 1, 1957 (age 69)
- Kate French born September 23, 1984 (age 42)
- Florida Friebus (1909–1988)
- Lauren Frost born May 25, 1985 (age 41)
- Lindsay Frost born June 4, 1962 (age 64)
- Taylor Fry born August 1, 1981 (age 45)
- Soleil Moon Frye born August 6, 1976 (age 50)
- Emma Fuhrmann born September 15, 2001 (age 25)
- Karen Fukuhara born February 10, 1992 (age 34)
- Holly Fulger
- Amanda Fuller born August 27, 1984 (age 42)
- Lisa Fuller
- Nikki Fuller born January 23, 1968 (age 58)
- Penny Fuller
- Victoria Fuller born December 11, 1970 (age 55)
- Wendy Fulton born March 26, 1954 (age 72)
- Melissa Fumero born August 19, 1982 (age 44)
- Mira Furlan (1955–2021)

== G ==
- June Gable born June 5, 1945 (age 81)
- Eva Gabor (1919–1995)
- Magda Gabor (1915–1997)
- Zsa Zsa Gabor (1917–2016)
- Lady Gaga born March 14, 1986 (age 40)
- Stacy Galina born September 24, 1966 (age 60)
- Megan Gallagher born February 6, 1960 (age 66)
- Gina Gallego born October 30, 1955 (age 71)
- Carla Gallo born June 24, 1975 (age 51)
- Teresa Ganzel born March 23, 1957 (age 69)
- Terri Garber born December 28, 1960 (age 65)
- Paula Garcés born March 20, 1974 (age 52)
- Aimee Garcia born November 28, 1978 (age 47)
- Jennifer Gareis born August 1, 1970 (age 56)
- Beverly Garland (1926–2008)
- Jennifer Garner born April 17, 1972 (age 54)
- Julia Garner born February 1, 1994 (age 32)
- Kelli Garner born April 11, 1984 (age 42)
- Peggy Ann Garner (1932–1984)
- Janeane Garofalo born September 28, 1964 (age 62)
- Teri Garr (1944–2024)
- Betty Garrett (1919–2011)
- Joy Garrett (1945–1993)
- Kathleen Garrett
- Maureen Garrett
- Susie Garrett (1929–2002)
- Jennie Garth born April 3, 1972 (age 54)
- Ana Gasteyer born May 4, 1967 (age 59)
- Stephanie Gatschet born March 16, 1983 (age 43)
- Rebecca Gayheart born August 12, 1971 (age 55)
- Cynthia Geary born March 21, 1965 (age 61)
- Ellen Geer born August 29, 1941 (age 85)
- Maggie Geha born April 4, 1988 (age 38)
- Sarah Michelle Gellar born April 14, 1977 (age 49)
- Rhoda Gemignani born October 21, 1939 (age 87)
- Lynda Day George born December 11, 1944 (age 81)
- Marita Geraghty born March 26, 1962 (age 64)
- Gina Gershon born June 10, 1962 (age 64)
- Jami Gertz born October 28, 1965 (age 61)
- Estelle Getty (1923–2008)
- Alice Ghostley (1923–2007)
- Cynthia Gibb born December 14, 1963 (age 62)
- Marla Gibbs born June 14, 1931 (age 95)
- Debbie Gibson born August 31, 1970 (age 56)
- Kelli Giddish born April 13, 1980 (age 46)
- Kathie Lee Gifford born August 16, 1953 (age 73)
- Melissa Gilbert born May 8, 1964 (age 62)
- Sara Gilbert born January 29, 1975 (age 51)
- Gwynne Gilford born July 27, 1946 (age 80)
- Ann Gillespie
- Anita Gillette born August 16, 1936 (age 90)
- Elizabeth Gillies born July 26, 1993 (age 33)
- Sarah Gilman born January 18, 1996 (age 30)
- Peri Gilpin born May 27, 1961 (age 65)
- Jessalyn Gilsig born November 30, 1971 (age 54)
- Erica Gimpel born June 25, 1964 (age 62)
- Annabeth Gish born March 13, 1971 (age 55)
- Lillian Gish (1893–1993)
- Adele Givens born July 1, 1960 (age 66)
- Robin Givens born November 27, 1964 (age 61)
- Nikki Glaser born June 1, 1984 (age 42)
- Summer Glau born July 24, 1981 (age 45)
- Lola Glaudini born November 24, 1971 (age 54)
- Joanna Gleason born June 2, 1950 (age 76)
- Mary Pat Gleason (1950–2020)
- Sarah Glendening born September 20, 1982 (age 44)
- Sharon Gless born May 31, 1943 (age 83)
- Linsey Godfrey born July 25, 1988 (age 38)
- Angela Goethals born May 20, 1977 (age 49)
- Joanna Going born July 22, 1963 (age 63)
- Judy Gold born November 15, 1962 (age 64)
- Missy Gold born July 14, 1970 (age 56)
- Tracey Gold born May 16, 1969 (age 57)
- Whoopi Goldberg born November 13, 1955 (age 71)
- Renée Elise Goldsberry born January 2, 1971 (age 55)
- Reagan Gomez-Preston born April 14, 1980 (age 46)
- Isabella Gomez born February 9, 1998 (age 28)
- Selena Gomez born July 22, 1992 (age 34)
- Meagan Good born August 8, 1981 (age 45)
- Lynda Goodfriend born October 31, 1953 (age 73)
- Deborah Goodrich born May 11, 1958 (age 68)
- Ginnifer Goodwin born May 22, 1978 (age 48)
- Kia Goodwin born August 2, 1973 (age 53)
- Raven Goodwin born June 24, 1992 (age 34)
- Lecy Goranson born June 22, 1974 (age 52)
- Eve Gordon born June 25, 1960 (age 66)
- Ashley Gorrell born January 1, 1985 (age 41)
- YaYa Gosselin born January 26, 2009 (age 17)
- Lauren Gottlieb born June 8, 1988 (age 38)
- Kelly Gould born August 4, 1999 (age 27)
- Sandra Gould (1916–1999)
- Milena Govich born October 29, 1976 (age 50)
- Elizabeth Gracen born April 3, 1961 (age 65)
- Ilene Graff born February 28, 1949 (age 77)
- Heather Graham born January 29, 1970 (age 56)
- Kat Graham born September 5, 1989 (age 37)
- Lauren Graham born March 16, 1967 (age 59)
- Nancy Lee Grahn born April 28, 1956 (age 70)
- Greer Grammer born February 15, 1992 (age 34)
- Spencer Grammer born October 9, 1983 (age 43)
- Ariana Grande born June 26, 1993 (age 33)
- Beth Grant born September 18, 1949 (age 77)
- Faye Grant born July 16, 1957 (age 69)
- Jennifer Grant born February 26, 1966 (age 60)
- Lee Grant born October 31, 1927 (age 99)
- Shelby Grant (1936–2011)
- Karen Grassle born February 25, 1942 (age 84)
- Teresa Graves (1948–2002)
- Erin Gray born January 7, 1950 (age 76)
- Linda Gray born September 12, 1940 (age 86)
- Macy Gray born September 6, 1967 (age 59)
- Sprague Grayden born July 21, 1980 (age 46)
- Jenna Leigh Green born August 22, 1974 (age 52)
- Lindsay and Sidney Greenbush born May 25, 1970 (age 56)
- Ashley Greene born February 21, 1987 (age 39)
- Ellen Greene born February 22, 1950 (age 76)
- Lizzy Greene born May 1, 2003 (age 23)
- Michele Greene born February 3, 1962 (age 64)
- Judy Greer born July 20, 1975 (age 51)
- Robin Greer born May 27, 1960 (age 66)
- Jennifer Grey born March 26, 1960 (age 66)
- Sasha Grey born March 14, 1988 (age 38)
- Pam Grier born May 26, 1949 (age 77)
- Kathy Griffin born November 4, 1960 (age 66)
- Melanie Griffith born August 9, 1957 (age 69)
- Rachel Griffiths
- Robyn Griggs (1973–2022)
- Camryn Grimes born January 7, 1990 (age 36)
- Shenae Grimes-Beech born October 24, 1989 (age 37)
- Tammy Grimes (1934–2016)
- Mary Gross born March 25, 1953 (age 73)
- Leslie Grossman born October 25, 1971 (age 55)
- Naomi Grossman born February 6, 1975 (age 51)
- Camille Guaty born June 28, 1976 (age 50)
- Jackie Guerra born July 25, 1965 (age 61)
- Diane Guerrero born July 21, 1986 (age 40)
- Evelyn Guerrero born February 24, 1949 (age 77)
- Lisa Guerrero born April 9, 1964 (age 62)
- Kimberly Norris Guerrero
- Zabryna Guevara born January 12, 1972 (age 54)
- Carla Gugino born August 29, 1971 (age 55)
- Ann Morgan Guilbert (1928–2016)
- Mamie Gummer born August 3, 1983 (age 43)
- Anna Gunn born August 11, 1968 (age 58)
- Janet Gunn born November 2, 1961 (age 65)
- Annabelle Gurwitch born November 4, 1961 (age 65)
- Elizabeth Gutiérrez born April 1, 1979 (age 47)
- Jasmine Guy born March 10, 1962 (age 64)
- Anne Gwynne (1918–2003)
- Maggie Gyllenhaal born November 16, 1977 (age 49)

== H ==
- Olivia Hack born June 13, 1983 (age 43)
- Shelley Hack born July 6, 1947 (age 79)
- Tiffany Haddish born December 3, 1979 (age 46)
- Julie Anne Haddock born April 3, 1965 (age 61)
- Molly Hagan born August 3, 1961 (age 65)
- Montrose Hagins (1917–2012)
- Nikki Hahn born November 13, 2002 (age 24)
- Stacy Haiduk born April 24, 1968 (age 58)
- Leisha Hailey born July 11, 1971 (age 55)
- Alison Haislip born February 6, 1981 (age 45)
- Khrystyne Haje born December 21, 1968 (age 57)
- Barbara Hale (1922–2017)
- Lucy Hale born June 14, 1989 (age 37)
- Alaina Reed Hall (1946–2009)
- Deidre Hall born October 31, 1947 (age 79)
- Irma P. Hall born June 3, 1935 (age 91)
- Natalie Hall born January 25, 1990 (age 36)
- Regina Hall born December 12, 1970 (age 55)
- Ronny Hallin born January 2, 1938 (age 88)
- Florence Halop (1923–1986)
- Veronica Hamel born November 20, 1943 (age 83)
- Carrie Hamilton (1963–2002)
- Kim Hamilton (1932–2013)
- Kipp Hamilton (1934–1981)
- Linda Hamilton born September 26, 1956 (age 70)
- LisaGay Hamilton born March 25, 1964 (age 62)
- Lois Hamilton (1943–1999)
- Lynn Hamilton (1930–2025)
- Barbara Hancock born November 21, 1949 (age 77)
- Chelsea Handler born February 25, 1975 (age 51)
- Anne Haney (1934–2001)
- Daryl Hannah born December 3, 1960 (age 65)
- G Hannelius born December 22, 1998 (age 27)
- Alyson Hannigan born March 24, 1974 (age 52)
- Marcia Gay Harden born August 14, 1959 (age 67)
- Melora Hardin born July 29, 1967 (age 59)
- Mariska Hargitay born January 23, 1964 (age 62)
- Angie Harmon born August 10, 1972 (age 54)
- Deborah Harmon born May 8, 1951 (age 75)
- Tanisha Harper born September 18, 1985 (age 41)
- Tess Harper born August 15, 1950 (age 76)
- Valerie Harper (1939–2019)
- Laura Harring born March 3, 1964 (age 62)
- Barbara Harris (1935–2018)
- Cynthia Harris (1934–2021)
- Danielle Harris born June 1, 1977 (age 49)
- Estelle Harris (1928–2022)
- Julie Harris (1925–2013)
- Mel Harris born July 12, 1956 (age 70)
- Rachael Harris born January 12, 1968 (age 58)
- Samantha Harris born November 23, 1973 (age 52)
- Jenilee Harrison born June 12, 1958 (age 68)
- Linda Harrison born June 26, 1945 (age 81)
- Kathryn Harrold born August 2, 1950 (age 76)
- Debbie Harry born July 1, 1945 (age 81)
- Jackée Harry born August 14, 1956 (age 70)
- Cecilia Hart (1948–2016)
- Emily Hart born May 2, 1986 (age 40)
- Melissa Joan Hart born April 18, 1976 (age 50)
- Lindsay Hartley born April 17, 1978 (age 48)
- Mariette Hartley born June 21, 1940 (age 86)
- Lisa Hartman Black born June 1, 1956 (age 70)
- Hayley Hasselhoff born August 26, 1992 (age 34)
- Teri Hatcher born December 8, 1964 (age 61)
- Amy Hathaway
- Anne Hathaway born November 12, 1982 (age 44)
- Ronni Hawk born September 9, 1999 (age 27)
- Hillary Hawkins
- Goldie Hawn born November 21, 1945 (age 81)
- Kim Hawthorne born April 19, 1968 (age 58)
- Melissa Hayden born November 13, 1967 (age 59)
- Billie Hayes (1924–2021)
- Susan Seaforth Hayes born July 11, 1943 (age 83)
- Kathryn Hays (1934–2022)
- Shari Headley born July 15, 1964 (age 62)
- Glenne Headly (1955–2017)
- Mehgan Heaney-Grier born August 26, 1977 (age 49)
- Amber Heard born April 22, 1986 (age 40)
- Marla Heasley born September 4, 1959 (age 67)
- Patricia Heaton born March 4, 1958 (age 68)
- Anne Heche (1969–2022)
- Gina Hecht born December 3, 1952 (age 73)
- Jessica Hecht born June 28, 1965 (age 61)
- Eileen Heckart (1919–2001)
- Alexandra Hedison born July 10, 1969 (age 57)
- Katherine Heigl born November 24, 1978 (age 47)
- Amelia Heinle born March 17, 1973 (age 53)
- Jayne Heitmeyer born October 30, 1960 (age 66)
- Grace Helbig born September 27, 1985 (age 41)
- Marg Helgenberger born November 16, 1958 (age 68)
- Katherine Helmond (1929–2019)
- Mariel Hemingway born November 22, 1961 (age 64)
- Shirley Hemphill (1947–1999)
- Florence Henderson (1934–2016)
- Lauri Hendler born April 22, 1965 (age 61)
- Tiffany Hendra born August 21, 1971 (age 55)
- Christina Hendricks born May 3, 1975 (age 51)
- Elizabeth Hendrickson born July 3, 1979 (age 47)
- Elaine Hendrix born December 28, 1970 (age 55)
- Leslie Hendrix born June 5, 1960 (age 66)
- Marilu Henner born April 6, 1952 (age 74)
- Carolyn Hennesy born June 10, 1962 (age 64)
- Jill Hennessy born November 25, 1968 (age 57)
- Shelley Hennig born January 2, 1987 (age 39)
- Linda Kaye Henning born September 16, 1944 (age 82)
- Emmaline Henry (1928–1979)
- Pamela Hensley born October 3, 1950 (age 76)
- Taraji P. Henson born September 11, 1970 (age 56)
- Katharine Hepburn (1907–2003)
- Rebecca Herbst born May 12, 1977 (age 49)
- Kathleen Herles born November 13, 1990 (age 36)
- April Lee Hernández born January 30, 1980 (age 46)
- Lilimar Hernandez born June 2, 2000 (age 26)
- Kristin Herrera born February 21, 1989 (age 37)
- Lynn Herring born September 22, 1958 (age 68)
- Jennifer Love Hewitt born February 21, 1979 (age 47)
- Catherine Hickland born February 11, 1956 (age 70)
- Catherine Hicks born August 6, 1951 (age 75)
- Grace Hightower born April 7, 1955 (age 71)
- Amy Hill born May 9, 1953 (age 73)
- Dana Hill (1964–1996)
- Lauryn Hill born May 26, 1975 (age 51)
- Kathy Hilton born March 13, 1959 (age 67)
- Paris Hilton born February 17, 1981 (age 45)
- Aisha Hinds born November 13, 1975 (age 51)
- Cheryl Hines born September 21, 1965 (age 61)
- Connie Hines (1931-2009)
- Tiffany Hines born September 2, 1983 (age 43)
- Marin Hinkle born March 23, 1966 (age 60)
- Hallee Hirsh born December 16, 1987 (age 38)
- Alice Hirson (1929-2025)
- Judith Hoag born June 29, 1968 (age 58)
- Kate Hodge born January 2, 1966 (age 60)
- Stephanie Hodge born December 24, 1956 (age 69)
- Cecil Hoffman born July 11, 1962 (age 64)
- Jackie Hoffman born November 29, 1960 (age 65)
- Gaby Hoffmann born January 8, 1982 (age 44)
- Susanna Hoffs born January 17, 1959 (age 67)
- Isabella Hofmann born December 11, 1958 (age 67)
- Brooke Hogan born May 5, 1988 (age 38)
- Anna Holbrook born April 18, 1957 (age 69)
- Rebecca Holden born June 12, 1958 (age 68)
- Meagan Holder born October 3, 1984 (age 42)
- Willa Holland born June 18, 1991 (age 35)
- Polly Holliday (1937–2025)
- Laurel Holloman born May 23, 1971 (age 55)
- Lauren Holly born October 28, 1963 (age 63)
- Celeste Holm (1917–2012)
- Jennifer Holmes born August 23, 1955 (age 71)
- Katie Holmes born December 18, 1978 (age 47)
- Olivia Holt born August 5, 1997 (age 29)
- Jan Hooks (1957–2014)
- Kaitlin Hopkins born February 1, 1964 (age 62)
- Telma Hopkins born October 28, 1948 (age 78)
- Monica Horan born January 29, 1963 (age 63)
- Lena Horne (1917–2010)
- Anna Maria Horsford born March 6, 1948 (age 78)
- Allison Hossack born January 26, 1965 (age 61)
- Adrienne Bailon-Houghton born October 24, 1983 (age 43)
- Lisa Howard born (1926-1965)
- Susan Howard born January 28, 1942 (age 84)
- Traylor Howard born June 14, 1966 (age 60)
- Beth Howland (1939–2015)
- Kelly Hu born February 13, 1968 (age 58)
- Madison Hu born June 2, 2002 (age 24)
- Erica Hubbard born January 2, 1979 (age 47)
- Janet Hubert born January 13, 1956 (age 70)
- Vanessa Hudgens born December 14, 1988 (age 37)
- Felicity Huffman born December 9, 1962 (age 63)
- Susan Hufford (1938–2006)
- Angee Hughes born November 22, 1955 (age 70)
- Sharon Hugueny (1944–1996)
- Finola Hughes born October 29, 1959 (age 67)
- Leann Hunley born February 25, 1955 (age 71)
- Mary-Margaret Humes born April 4, 1954 (age 72)
- Bonnie Hunt born September 22, 1961 (age 65)
- Helen Hunt born June 15, 1963 (age 63)
- Amy Hunter born May 6, 1966 (age 60)
- Holly Hunter born March 20, 1958 (age 68)
- Kim Hunter (1922–2002)
- Jana Marie Hupp born April 2, 1964 (age 62)
- Michelle Hurd born December 21, 1966 (age 59)
- Paige Hurd born July 20, 1992 (age 34)
- Sherry Hursey born November 22, 1956 (age 69)
- Mary Beth Hurt born September 26, 1946 (age 80)
- Anjelica Huston born July 8, 1951 (age 75)
- Carol Huston born August 15, 1963 (age 63)
- Fiona Hutchison born May 17, 1960 (age 66)
- Candace Hutson born May 3, 1980 (age 46)
- Gunilla Hutton born May 14, 1944 (age 82)
- Lauren Hutton born November 17, 1943 (age 83)
- Jamie Gray Hyder born April 27, 1985 (age 41)
- Diana Hyland (1936–1977)
- Sarah Hyland born November 24, 1990 (age 35)

== I ==
- Annie Ilonzeh born August 23, 1983 (age 43)
- Carrie Ann Inaba born January 5, 1968 (age 58)
- Indigo born June 25, 1984 (age 42)
- Laura Innes born August 16, 1957 (age 69)
- Kathy Ireland born March 20, 1963 (age 63)
- Paula Irvine born June 22, 1968 (age 58)
- Bindi Irwin born July 24, 1998 (age 28)
- Terri Irwin born July 20, 1964 (age 62)
- Dana Ivey born August 12, 1941 (age 85)
- Judith Ivey born September 4, 1951 (age 75)

== J ==
- Dominique Jackson born March 20, 1975 (age 51)
- Janet Jackson born May 16, 1966 (age 60)
- Kate Jackson born October 29, 1948 (age 78)
- LaTanya Richardson Jackson born October 21, 1949 (age 77)
- Leeah D. Jackson born January 26, 1998 (age 28)
- Mary Jackson (1910-2005)
- Paris Jackson born April 3, 1988 (age 38)
- Shar Jackson born August 31, 1976 (age 50)
- Skai Jackson born April 8, 2002 (age 24)
- Gillian Jacobs born October 19, 1982 (age 44)
- Francesca James born January 23, 1949 (age 77)
- Joyce Jameson (1932-1987)
- Allison Janney born November 19, 1959 (age 67)
- Erika Jayne born July 10, 1971 (age 55)
- Jazzmun born February 10, 1969 (age 57)
- Carol Mayo Jenkins born November 24, 1938 (age 87)
- Claudia Jennings (1949-1979)
- Dominique Jennings born October 31, 1965 (age 61)
- Juanita Jennings born September 12, 1952 (age 74)
- Penny Johnson Jerald born March 14, 1961 (age 65)
- Geri Jewell born September 13, 1956 (age 70)
- Ann Jillian born January 29, 1950 (age 76)
- Joyce Jillson (1945-2004)
- Tsianina Joelson born January 16, 1975 (age 51)
- Adrienne-Joi Johnson born January 2, 1963 (age 63)
- Amy Jo Johnson born October 6, 1970 (age 56)
- Anjelah Johnson born May 14, 1982 (age 44)
- Anne-Marie Johnson born July 18, 1960 (age 66)
- Ariyan A. Johnson born April 30, 1976 (age 50)
- Ashley Johnson born August 9, 1983 (age 43)
- Beverly Johnson born October 13, 1952 (age 74)
- Cherie Johnson born November 21, 1975 (age 51)
- Dakota Johnson born October 4, 1989 (age 37)
- Georgann Johnson (1926-2018)
- Joanna Johnson born December 31, 1961 (age 64)
- Laura Johnson born August 1, 1957 (age 69)
- Lynn-Holly Johnson born December 13, 1958 (age 67)
- Kristen Johnston born September 20, 1967 (age 59)
- JoJo born December 20, 1990 (age 35)
- Betsy Jones-Moreland (1930-2006)
- Ashley Jones born September 3, 1976 (age 50)
- Carolyn Jones (1930-1983)
- Coco Jones born January 4, 1998 (age 28)
- Dot-Marie Jones born January 4, 1964 (age 62)
- January Jones born January 5, 1978 (age 48)
- Jill Marie Jones born January 4, 1975 (age 51)
- Leslie Jones born September 7, 1967 (age 59)
- Rashida Jones born February 25, 1976 (age 50)
- Renée Jones born October 15, 1958 (age 68)
- Shirley Jones born March 31, 1934 (age 92)
- Ta'Rhonda Jones born July 12, 1988 (age 38)
- Tamala Jones born November 12, 1974 (age 52)
- Toccara Jones born March 13, 1981 (age 45)
- Kathryn Joosten (1939-2012)
- Alexis Jordan born April 7, 1992 (age 34)
- Bobbi Jordan (1937-2012)
- Claudia Jordan born April 12, 1973 (age 53)
- Lydia Jordan born June 12, 1994 (age 32)
- Olivia Jordan born September 28, 1988 (age 38)
- Sharon Jordan born March 11, 1960 (age 66)
- Jackie Joseph born November 7, 1933 (age 93)
- Milla Jovovich born December 17, 1975 (age 50)
- Malese Jow born February 18, 1991 (age 35)
- Elaine Joyce born December 19, 1945 (age 80)
- Ella Joyce born June 12, 1954 (age 72)
- Ashley Judd born April 19, 1968 (age 58)
- Katherine Justice born October 28, 1942 (age 84)
- Victoria Justice born February 19, 1993 (age 33)

== K ==
- Jane Kaczmarek born December 21, 1955 (age 70)
- Madeline Kahn (1942–1999)
- Patricia Kalember born December 30, 1956 (age 69)
- Mindy Kaling born June 24, 1979 (age 47)
- Melina Kanakaredes born April 23, 1967 (age 59)
- Carol Kane born June 18, 1952 (age 74)
- Chelsea Kane born September 15, 1988 (age 38)
- Shannon Kane born September 14, 1986 (age 40)
- Nicole Kang born June 30, 1993 (age 33)
- Mitzi Kapture born May 2, 1962 (age 64)
- Kim Kardashian born October 21, 1980 (age 46)
- Alexandria Karlsen born October 26, 1978 (age 48)
- Jean Kasem
- Stana Katic born April 26, 1978 (age 48)
- Julie Kavner born September 7, 1950 (age 76)
- Caren Kaye born March 12, 1951 (age 75)
- Staci Keanan born June 6, 1975 (age 51)
- Diane Keaton (1946–2025)
- Mary Jo Keenen
- Stacy Keibler born October 14, 1979 (age 47)
- Mary Page Keller born March 3, 1961 (age 65)
- Melissa Keller born August 4, 1979 (age 47)
- Rachel Keller born December 25, 1992 (age 33)
- Sally Kellerman (1937–2022)
- Susan Kellermann born July 4, 1944 (age 82)
- Sheila Kelley born October 9, 1964 (age 62)
- Jean Louisa Kelly born March 9, 1972 (age 54)
- Kitty Kelly (1902–1968)
- Lisa Robin Kelly (1970–2013)
- Minka Kelly born June 24, 1980 (age 46)
- Moira Kelly born March 6, 1968 (age 58)
- Patsy Kelly (1910–1981)
- Paula Kelly (1942–2020)
- Rae'Ven Larrymore Kelly born June 28, 1985 (age 41)
- Linda Kelsey born July 28, 1946 (age 80)
- Ellie Kemper born May 2, 1980 (age 46)
- Anna Kendrick born August 9, 1985 (age 41)
- Jessica Parker Kennedy born October 3, 1984 (age 42)
- Mimi Kennedy born September 25, 1948 (age 78)
- Shannon Kenny born May 23, 1971 (age 55)
- Leila Kenzle born July 16, 1960 (age 66)
- Joanna Kerns born February 12, 1953 (age 73)
- Sandra Kerns born July 20, 1949 (age 77)
- Elizabeth Kerr (1912–2000)
- T'Keyah Crystal Keymah born October 13, 1962 (age 64)
- Alicia Keys born January 25, 1981 (age 45)
- Simbi Khali born April 28, 1971 (age 55)
- Christel Khalil born November 30, 1987 (age 38)
- Margot Kidder (1948–2018)
- Kaleena Kiff born October 23, 1974 (age 52)
- Wendy Kilbourne born June 29, 1964 (age 62)
- Tara Killian born June 21, 1977 (age 49)
- Stephanie Kim born October 16, 1987 (age 39)
- Aja Naomi King born January 11, 1985 (age 41)
- Carole King born February 9, 1942 (age 84)
- Cleo King born August 21, 1962 (age 64)
- Kent Masters King born August 5, 1974 (age 52)
- Mabel King (1932–1999)
- Regina King born January 15, 1971 (age 55)
- Alex Kingston born March 11, 1963 (age 63)
- Kathleen Kinmont born February 3, 1965 (age 61)
- Kathy Kinney born November 3, 1954 (age 72)
- Angela Kinsey born June 25, 1971 (age 55)
- Sally Kirkland (1941–2025)
- Tawny Kitaen (1961–2021)
- Eartha Kitt (1927–2008)
- Hayley Kiyoko born April 3, 1991 (age 35)
- Pat Klous born October 19, 1948 (age 78)
- Heidi Klum born June 1, 1973 (age 53)
- Keshia Knight Pulliam born April 9, 1979 (age 47)
- Gladys Knight born May 28, 1944 (age 82)
- Christy Knowings born February 25, 1980 (age 46)
- Shanica Knowles born November 17, 1990 (age 36)
- Gail Kobe (1932–2013)
- Ava Kolker born December 5, 2006 (age 19)
- Karen Kopins born October 10, 1961 (age 65)
- Jenn Korbee born May 24, 1980 (age 46)
- Mia Korf born November 1, 1966 (age 60)
- Alla Korot born November 1, 1970 (age 56)
- Liza Koshy born March 31, 1996 (age 30)
- Lauren Koslow born March 9, 1953 (age 73)
- Harley Jane Kozak born January 28, 1957 (age 69)
- Jane Krakowski born October 11, 1968 (age 58)
- Clare Kramer
- Jana Kramer born December 2, 1983 (age 42)
- Stepfanie Kramer born August 6, 1956 (age 70)
- Zoë Kravitz born December 1, 1988 (age 37)
- Alice Krige born June 28, 1954 (age 72)
- Ilene Kristen born July 30, 1952 (age 74)
- Suzanne Krull (1966-2013)
- Lisa Kudrow born July 30, 1963 (age 63)
- Nancy Kulp (1921–1991)
- Mila Kunis born August 14, 1983 (age 43)
- Swoosie Kurtz born September 6, 1944 (age 82)
- Katy Kurtzman born September 16, 1965 (age 61)
- Jennie Kwan born September 9, 1973 (age 53)
- Nancy Kwan born May 19, 1939 (age 87)

== L ==
- Patti Labelle born May 24, 1944 (age 82)
- Gina La Piana
- Alison La Placa born December 16, 1959 (age 66)
- Cheryl Ladd born July 12, 1951 (age 75)
- Diane Ladd (1935–2025)
- Jordan Ladd born January 14, 1975 (age 51)
- Margaret Ladd born November 8, 1945 (age 81)
- Bonnie-Jill Laflin born March 15, 1976 (age 50)
- Lady Gaga born March 14, 1986 (age 40)
- Christine Lahti born April 4, 1950 (age 76)
- Elizabeth Lail born March 25, 1992 (age 34)
- Leah Lail born December 17, 1965 (age 60)
- Ricki Lake born September 21, 1968 (age 58)
- Veronica Lake (1922–1973)
- Christine Lakin born January 25, 1979 (age 47)
- Lalaine born June 3, 1987 (age 39)
- Shayne Lamas born November 6, 1985 (age 41)
- Amber Lancaster born September 19, 1980 (age 46)
- Sarah Lancaster born February 12, 1980 (age 46)
- Audrey Landers born July 18, 1956 (age 70)
- Judy Landers born October 7, 1958 (age 68)
- Jennifer Landon born August 29, 1983 (age 43)
- Leslie Landon born October 11, 1962 (age 64)
- Sofia Landon Geier born January 24, 1949 (age 77)
- Ali Landry born July 21, 1973 (age 53)
- Valerie Landsburg born August 12, 1958 (age 68)
- Briana Lane born October 27, 1985 (age 41)
- Diane Lane born January 22, 1965 (age 61)
- Lauren Lane born February 2, 1961 (age 65)
- Katherine Kelly Lang born July 25, 1961 (age 65)
- Hope Lange (1933–2003)
- Jessica Lange born April 20, 1949 (age 77)
- Heather Langenkamp born July 17, 1964 (age 62)
- A. J. Langer born May 22, 1974 (age 52)
- Brooke Langton born November 27, 1970 (age 55)
- Kim Lankford born June 14, 1954 (age 72)
- Angela Lansbury (1925–2022)
- Liza Lapira born December 3, 1981 (age 44)
- Linda Larkin born March 20, 1970 (age 56)
- Brie Larson born October 1, 1989 (age 37)
- Jill Larson born October 7, 1947 (age 79)
- Ali Larter born February 28, 1976 (age 50)
- Eva LaRue born December 27, 1966 (age 59)
- Louise Lasser (1939-2026)
- Louise Latham (1922–2018)
- Sanaa Lathan born September 19, 1971 (age 55)
- Queen Latifah born March 18, 1970 (age 56)
- Cyndi Lauper born June 22, 1953 (age 73)
- Tammy Lauren born November 16, 1968 (age 58)
- Piper Laurie (1932–2023)
- Linda Lavin (1937-2024)
- Reneé Lawless born November 30, 1960 (age 65)
- Carol Lawrence born September 5, 1932 (age 94)
- Jennifer Lawrence born August 15, 1990 (age 36)
- Sharon Lawrence born June 29, 1961 (age 65)
- Vicki Lawrence born March 26, 1949 (age 77)
- Bianca Lawson born March 20, 1979 (age 47)
- Maggie Lawson born August 12, 1980 (age 46)
- Ava Lazar
- Sabrina Le Beauf born March 21, 1958 (age 68)
- Nicole Leach born May 10, 1979 (age 47)
- Cloris Leachman (1926–2021)
- NeNe Leakes born December 13, 1967 (age 58)
- Sharon Leal born October 17, 1972 (age 54)
- Michael Learned born April 9, 1939 (age 87)
- Brianne Leary born July 28, 1957 (age 69)
- Jessica Leccia born January 8, 1976 (age 50)
- Brandy Ledford born February 4, 1969 (age 57)
- Alexondra Lee born February 8, 1975 (age 51)
- Michele Lee born June 24, 1942 (age 84)
- Peyton Elizabeth Lee born May 22, 2004 (age 22)
- Raquel Lee born October 13, 1986 (age 40)
- Sheryl Lee born April 22, 1967 (age 59)
- Sondra Lee (1928–2026)
- Jane Leeves born April 18, 1961 (age 65)
- Kristin Lehman born May 3, 1972 (age 54)
- Hudson Leick born May 9, 1969 (age 57)
- Carol Leifer born July 27, 1956 (age 70)
- Chyler Leigh born April 10, 1982 (age 44)
- Janet Leigh (1927–2004)
- Jennifer Jason Leigh born February 5, 1962 (age 64)
- Amanda Leighton born June 7, 1993 (age 33)
- Laura Leighton born July 24, 1968 (age 58)
- Heidi Lenhart
- Rosetta LeNoire (1911–2002)
- Bethany Joy Lenz born April 2, 1981 (age 45)
- Kay Lenz born March 4, 1953 (age 73)
- Melissa Leo born September 14, 1960 (age 66)
- Adrianne León born March 15, 1987 (age 39)
- Téa Leoni born February 25, 1966 (age 60)
- Clea Lewis born July 19, 1965 (age 61)
- Dawnn Lewis born August 13, 1961 (age 65)
- Jazsmin Lewis born March 22, 1976 (age 50)
- Jenifer Lewis born January 25, 1957 (age 69)
- Jenny Lewis born January 8, 1976 (age 50)
- Judy Lewis (1935–2011)
- Juliette Lewis born June 21, 1973 (age 53)
- Kimrie Lewis born March 16, 1982 (age 44)
- Sagan Lewis (1952–2016)
- Toni Lewis
- Vicki Lewis born March 17, 1960 (age 66)
- Jennifer Lien born August 24, 1974 (age 52)
- Tina Lifford born May 1, 1966 (age 60)
- Judith Light born February 9, 1949 (age 77)
- Lar Park Lincoln (1961-2025)
- Natalie Alyn Lind born June 21, 1999 (age 27)
- Kate Linder born November 2, 1947 (age 79)
- Audra Lindley (1918–1997)
- Laura Linney born February 5, 1964 (age 62)
- Joanne Linville (1928–2021)
- Tara Lipinski born June 10, 1982 (age 44)
- Peggy Lipton (1946–2019)
- Peyton List (actress, born 1986) born August 8, 1986 (age 40)
- Peyton List (actress, born 1998) born April 6, 1998 (age 28)
- Zoe Lister-Jones born September 1, 1982 (age 44)
- Beth Littleford born July 17, 1968 (age 58)
- Lucy Liu born December 2, 1968 (age 57)
- Blake Lively born August 25, 1987 (age 39)
- Robyn Lively born February 7, 1972 (age 54)
- Natalia Livingston born March 26, 1976 (age 50)
- Kari Lizer born August 26, 1961 (age 65)
- Kathleen Lloyd born September 13, 1948 (age 78)
- Sabrina Lloyd born November 20, 1970 (age 56)
- Amy Locane born December 19, 1971 (age 54)
- Lisa LoCicero born April 18, 1970 (age 56)
- Tembi Locke born July 26, 1970 (age 56)
- Anne Lockhart born September 6, 1953 (age 73)
- June Lockhart (1925–2025)
- Heather Locklear born September 25, 1961 (age 65)
- Lindsay Lohan born July 2, 1986 (age 40)
- Alison Lohman born September 18, 1979 (age 47)
- Kristanna Loken born October 8, 1979 (age 47)
- Julie London (1926–2000)
- Lauren London born December 5, 1984 (age 41)
- Jodi Long born January 7, 1954 (age 72)
- Nia Long born October 30, 1970 (age 56)
- Shelley Long born August 23, 1949 (age 77)
- Eva Longoria born March 15, 1975 (age 51)
- Jennifer Lopez born July 24, 1969 (age 57)
- Gloria Loring born December 10, 1946 (age 79)
- Lisa Loring (1958–2023)
- Lynn Loring (1943-2023)
- Lori Loughlin born July 28, 1964 (age 62)
- Julia Louis-Dreyfus born January 13, 1961 (age 65)
- Tina Louise born February 11, 1934 (age 92)
- Billie Lourd born July 17, 1992 (age 34)
- Demi Lovato born August 20, 1992 (age 34)
- Deirdre Lovejoy born June 30, 1962 (age 64)
- Patrice Lovely born January 4, 1968 (age 58)
- Carey Lowell born February 11, 1961 (age 65)
- Marcella Lowery born April 27, 1945 (age 81)
- Katie Lowes born September 22, 1982 (age 44)
- Myrna Loy (1905–1993)
- Florencia Lozano born December 16, 1969 (age 56)
- Jessica Lucas born September 24, 1985 (age 41)
- Susan Lucci born December 23, 1946 (age 79)
- Dorothy Lucey born November 19, 1958 (age 68)
- LeToya Luckett born March 11, 1981 (age 45)
- Deanna Lund (1937–2018)
- Jessica Lundy born March 20, 1966 (age 60)
- Jamie Luner born May 12, 1971 (age 55)
- Ida Lupino (1918–1995)
- Patti LuPone born April 21, 1949 (age 77)
- Masiela Lusha born October 23, 1985 (age 41)
- Dorothy Lyman born April 18, 1947 (age 79)
- Jane Lynch born July 14, 1960 (age 66)
- Carol Lynley (1942–2019)
- Janice Lynde born March 28, 1948 (age 78)
- Meredith Scott Lynn born March 8, 1970 (age 56)
- Tanisha Lynn born September 14, 1978 (age 48)
- Judy Lynne born July 22, 1943 (age 83)
- Melanie Lynskey born May 16, 1977 (age 49)
- Natasha Lyonne born April 4, 1979 (age 47)

== M ==
- Sunny Mabrey born November 28, 1975 (age 50)
- Jes Macallan born August 9, 1982 (age 44)
- Ali MacGraw born April 1, 1939 (age 87)
- Justina Machado born September 6, 1972 (age 54)
- Allison Mack born July 29, 1982 (age 44)
- Janet MacLachlan (1933–2010)
- Shirley MacLaine born April 24, 1934 (age 92)
- Elizabeth MacRae (1936-2024)
- Meredith MacRae (1944–2000)
- Sheila MacRae (1921–2014)
- Amy Madigan born September 11, 1950 (age 76)
- Bailee Madison born October 15, 1999 (age 27)
- Mikey Madison born March 25, 1999 (age 27)
- Virginia Madsen born September 11, 1961 (age 65)
- Deedee Magno Hall born April 2, 1975 (age 51)
- Ann Magnuson born January 4, 1956 (age 70)
- Valerie Mahaffey (1953-2025)
- Mallory James Mahoney born January 31, 2005 (age 21)
- Kayla Maisonet born June 20, 1999 (age 27)
- Beth Maitland born May 12, 1958 (age 68)
- Tina Majorino born February 7, 1985 (age 41)
- Wendy Makkena born October 4, 1958 (age 68)
- Wendie Malick born December 13, 1950 (age 75)
- Jena Malone born November 21, 1984 (age 42)
- Nancy Malone (1935–2014)
- Zosia Mamet born February 2, 1988 (age 38)
- Melissa Manchester born February 15, 1951 (age 75)
- Camryn Manheim born March 8, 1961 (age 65)
- Sunita Mani born December 13, 1986 (age 39)
- Aarti Mann born March 3, 1978 (age 48)
- Aimee Mann born September 8, 1960 (age 66)
- Leslie Mann born March 26, 1972 (age 54)
- Dinah Manoff born January 25, 1956 (age 70)
- Jayne Mansfield (1933–1967)
- Sally Mansfield (1923–2001)
- Marla Maples born October 27, 1963 (age 63)
- Kate Mara born February 27, 1983 (age 43)
- Mary Mara (1960–2022)
- Rooney Mara born April 17, 1985 (age 41)
- Laura Marano born November 29, 1995 (age 30)
- Vanessa Marano born October 31, 1992 (age 34)
- Stephanie March born July 23, 1974 (age 52)
- Nancy Marchand (1928–2000)
- Vanessa Marcil born October 15, 1968 (age 58)
- Eva Marcille born October 30, 1984 (age 42)
- Janet Margolin (1943–1993)
- Julianna Margulies born June 8, 1966 (age 60)
- Constance Marie born September 9, 1965 (age 61)
- Ada Maris born June 13, 1957 (age 69)
- Kelli Maroney born December 30, 1960 (age 65)
- McKayla Maroney born December 9, 1995 (age 30)
- Linda Marsh born February 8, 1939 (age 87)
- Paula Marshall born June 12, 1964 (age 62)
- Penny Marshall (1943–2018)
- Trudy Marshall (1920–2004)
- Vanessa Marshall born October 19, 1969 (age 57)
- Martika born May 18, 1969 (age 57)
- Andrea Martin born January 15, 1947 (age 79)
- Anne-Marie Martin born November 11, 1957 (age 69)
- Deana Martin born August 19, 1948 (age 78)
- Helen Martin (1909–2000)
- Kellie Martin born October 16, 1975 (age 51)
- Lori Martin (1947–2010)
- Madeleine Martin born April 15, 1993 (age 33)
- Marsai Martin born August 14, 2004 (age 22)
- Meaghan Martin born February 17, 1992 (age 34)
- Millicent Martin born June 8, 1934 (age 92)
- Nan Martin (1927–2010)
- Nikki Martin
- Pamela Sue Martin born January 5, 1953 (age 73)
- Natalie Martinez born July 12, 1984 (age 42)
- Elizabeth Marvel born November 27, 1969 (age 56)
- Chase Masterson born February 26, 1963 (age 63)
- Mary Stuart Masterson born June 28, 1966 (age 60)
- Mary Elizabeth Mastrantonio born November 17, 1958 (age 68)
- Heather Matarazzo born November 10, 1982 (age 44)
- Debbie Matenopoulos born December 13, 1974 (age 51)
- Elizabeth Mathis
- Samantha Mathis born May 12, 1970 (age 56)
- Marlee Matlin born August 24, 1965 (age 61)
- DeLane Matthews born August 7, 1961 (age 65)
- Robin Mattson born June 1, 1956 (age 70)
- Kim Matula born August 23, 1988 (age 38)
- Abigail Mavity born March 4, 1993 (age 33)
- Jenny Maxwell (1941–1981)
- Lauren Mayhew born November 27, 1985 (age 40)
- Melanie Mayron born October 20, 1952 (age 74)
- Eaddy Mays born January 6, 1971 (age 55)
- Jayma Mays born July 16, 1979 (age 47)
- Tristin Mays born June 10, 1990 (age 36)
- Debi Mazar born August 13, 1964 (age 62)
- Heather McAdam born January 24, 1968 (age 58)
- Diane McBain (1941–2022)
- Harlee McBride born November 20, 1948 (age 78)
- Melissa McBride born May 23, 1965 (age 61)
- Frances Lee McCain born July 28, 1943 (age 83)
- Mitzi McCall (1930-2024)
- Shalane McCall born September 16, 1972 (age 54)
- Christine Elise McCarthy born February 12, 1965 (age 61)
- Jenny McCarthy born November 1, 1972 (age 54)
- Melissa McCarthy born August 26, 1970 (age 56)
- Kelli McCarty born September 16, 1969 (age 57)
- Constance McCashin born June 18, 1947 (age 79)
- Peggy McCay (1927–2018)
- Cady McClain born October 13, 1969 (age 57)
- China Anne McClain born August 25, 1998 (age 28)
- Sierra McClain born March 16, 1994 (age 32)
- Rue McClanahan (1934–2010)
- Kathleen McClellan born April 28, 1970 (age 56)
- Judith McConnell born April 6, 1944 (age 82)
- AnnaLynne McCord born July 16, 1987 (age 39)
- Mary McCormack born February 8, 1969 (age 57)
- Patty McCormack born August 21, 1945 (age 81)
- Carolyn McCormick born September 19, 1959 (age 67)
- Maureen McCormick born August 5, 1956 (age 70)
- Sierra McCormick born October 28, 1997 (age 29)
- LisaRaye McCoy born September 23, 1967 (age 59)
- Julie McCullough born January 30, 1965 (age 61)
- Kimberly McCullough born March 5, 1978 (age 48)
- Jennette McCurdy born June 26, 1992 (age 34)
- Hattie McDaniel (1893–1952)
- Audra McDonald born July 3, 1970 (age 56)
- Mary McDonnell born April 28, 1952 (age 74)
- Eileen McDonough (1962–2012)
- Mary Elizabeth McDonough born May 4, 1961 (age 65)
- Frances McDormand born June 23, 1957 (age 69)
- Reba McEntire born March 28, 1955 (age 71)
- Gates McFadden born March 2, 1949 (age 77)
- Trina McGee born September 6, 1959 (age 67)
- Vonetta McGee (1945–2010)
- Kelly McGillis born July 9, 1957 (age 69)
- Elizabeth McGovern born July 18, 1961 (age 65)
- Rose McGowan born September 5, 1973 (age 53)
- Melinda McGraw born October 25, 1968 (age 58)
- Maeve McGuire born July 24, 1937 (age 89)
- Danica McKellar born January 3, 1975 (age 51)
- Alex McKenna born October 15, 1984 (age 42)
- Lindsey McKeon born March 11, 1982 (age 44)
- Nancy McKeon born April 4, 1966 (age 60)
- Kate McKinnon born January 6, 1984 (age 42)
- Beverlee McKinsey (1935–2008)
- Elizabeth McLaughlin born October 2, 1993 (age 33)
- Emily McLaughlin (1928–1991)
- Madison McLaughlin born November 5, 1995 (age 31)
- Zoe McLellan born November 6, 1974 (age 52)
- Wendi McLendon-Covey born October 10, 1969 (age 57)
- Jenna McMahon (1925–2015)
- Michaela McManus born May 20, 1983 (age 43)
- Barbara McNair (1934–2007)
- Heather McNair
- Kate McNeil born August 17, 1958 (age 68)
- Kristy McNichol born September 11, 1962 (age 64)
- Julie McNiven born October 11, 1980 (age 46)
- Patricia McNulty (1942-2023)
- Katharine McPhee born March 25, 1984 (age 42)
- Patricia McPherson born November 27, 1954 (age 71)
- Megan McTavish born April 30, 1949 (age 77)
- Eve McVeagh (1919–1997)
- Caroline McWilliams (1945–2010)
- Audrey Meadows (1922–1996)
- Jayne Meadows (1919–2015)
- Kristen Meadows born January 7, 1957 (age 69)
- Anne Meara (1929–2015)
- Barbara Meek (1934–2015)
- Theresa Meeker born February 6, 1986 (age 40)
- Leighton Meester born April 9, 1986 (age 40)
- Meghan, Duchess of Sussex born August 4, 1981 (age 45)
- Daniela Melchior born November 1, 1996 (age 30)
- Kate Melton born June 23, 1992 (age 34)
- Camila Mendes born June 29, 1994 (age 32)
- Eva Mendes born March 5, 1974 (age 52)
- Bridgit Mendler born December 18, 1992 (age 33)
- Maria Menounos born June 8, 1978 (age 48)
- Idina Menzel born May 30, 1971 (age 55)
- Marian Mercer (1935–2011)
- Lee Meriwether born May 27, 1935 (age 91)
- Una Merkel (1903–1986)
- S. Epatha Merkerson born November 28, 1952 (age 73)
- Theresa Merritt (1922-1998)
- Tammy Faye Messner (1942–2007)
- Debra Messing born August 15, 1968 (age 58)
- Laurie Metcalf born June 16, 1955 (age 71)
- Chrissy Metz born September 29, 1980 (age 46)
- Rebecca Metz born September 29, 1973 (age 53)
- Caitlin EJ Meyer born February 29, 1992 (age 34)
- Dina Meyer born December 22, 1968 (age 57)
- Ari Meyers born April 6, 1969 (age 57)
- Lucia Micarelli born July 9, 1983 (age 43)
- Justine Miceli born April 30, 1959 (age 67)
- Jeanna Michaels (1956–2018)
- Kari Michaelsen born November 3, 1961 (age 65)
- AJ Michalka born April 10, 1991 (age 35)
- Aly Michalka born March 25, 1989 (age 37)
- Lea Michele born August 29, 1986 (age 40)
- Michael Michele born August 30, 1966 (age 60)
- Cathryn Michon
- Kate Micucci born March 31, 1980 (age 46)
- Midajah born March 23, 1970 (age 56)
- Tracy Middendorf born January 26, 1970 (age 56)
- Vanessa Middleton
- Bette Midler born December 1, 1945 (age 80)
- Amber Midthunder born April 26, 1997 (age 29)
- Mikaila born December 15, 1986 (age 39)
- Alyssa Milano born December 19, 1972 (age 53)
- Elaine Miles born April 7, 1960 (age 66)
- Joanna Miles born March 6, 1940 (age 86)
- Christa Miller born May 28, 1964 (age 62)
- Cymphonique Miller born August 1, 1996 (age 30)
- Lara Jill Miller born April 20, 1967 (age 59)
- Penelope Ann Miller born January 13, 1964 (age 62)
- Sienna Miller born December 28, 1981 (age 44)
- Valarie Rae Miller born April 16, 1974 (age 52)
- Alley Mills born May 9, 1951 (age 75)
- Donna Mills born December 11, 1940 (age 85)
- Hayley Mills born April 18, 1946 (age 80)
- Juliet Mills born November 21, 1941 (age 85)
- Shirley Mills (1926–2010)
- Jane Milmore (1955–2020)
- Jennifer Milmore born October 1, 1969 (age 57)
- Candi Milo born January 9, 1961 (age 65)
- Sofia Milos born September 27, 1969 (age 57)
- Yvette Mimieux (1942–2022)
- Jan Miner (1917–2004)
- Kate Miner born September 7, 1984 (age 42)
- Rachel Miner born July 29, 1980 (age 46)
- Liza Minnelli born March 12, 1946 (age 80)
- Kathryn Minner (1892–1969)
- Alicia Minshew born May 28, 1974 (age 52)
- Kelly Jo Minter born July 14, 1966 (age 60)
- MioSoty
- Irene Miracle born January 24, 1954 (age 72)
- Aeriél Miranda born April 3, 1992 (age 34)
- Beverley Mitchell born January 22, 1981 (age 45)
- Elizabeth Mitchell born March 27, 1970 (age 56)
- Julia Pace Mitchell born February 10, 1978 (age 48)
- Maia Mitchell born August 18, 1993 (age 33)
- Shay Mitchell born April 10, 1987 (age 39)
- Katy Mixon born March 30, 1981 (age 45)
- Kim Miyori born January 4, 1951 (age 75)
- Diane Mizota born September 9, 1973 (age 53)
- Mo'Nique born December 11, 1967 (age 58)
- Shanna Moakler born March 28, 1975 (age 51)
- Mary Ann Mobley (1937–2014)
- Katherine Moennig born December 29, 1977 (age 48)
- Gretchen Mol born November 9, 1972 (age 54)
- Janel Moloney born October 3, 1969 (age 57)
- Taylor Momsen born July 26, 1993 (age 33)
- Kelly Monaco born May 23, 1976 (age 50)
- Marjorie Monaghan born March 19, 1964 (age 62)
- Michelle Monaghan born March 23, 1976 (age 50)
- Mercedes Moné born January 26, 1992 (age 34)
- Daniella Monet born March 1, 1989 (age 37)
- Wendy Moniz born January 19, 1969 (age 57)
- Meredith Monroe born December 30, 1969 (age 56)
- Sumalee Montano born August 3, 1972 (age 54)
- Barbara Montgomery born June 25, 1939 (age 87)
- Elizabeth Montgomery (1933-1995)
- Julia Montgomery born July 2, 1960 (age 66)
- Poppy Montgomery born June 15, 1972 (age 54)
- Lynne Moody born February 17, 1945 (age 81)
- Debra Mooney born August 28, 1947 (age 79)
- Christina Moore born April 12, 1973 (age 53)
- Demi Moore born November 11, 1962 (age 64)
- Julianne Moore born December 3, 1960 (age 65)
- Kenya Moore born January 24, 1971 (age 55)
- Mandy Moore born April 10, 1984 (age 42)
- Mary Tyler Moore (1936–2017)
- Melba Moore born October 29, 1945 (age 81)
- Agnes Moorehead (1900–1974)
- Erin Moran (1960–2017)
- Belita Moreno born November 1, 1949 (age 77)
- Rita Moreno born December 11, 1931 (age 94)
- Cindy Morgan (1954-2023)
- Debbi Morgan born September 20, 1956 (age 70)
- Jaye P. Morgan (1931–2026)
- Mishael Morgan born July 15, 1986 (age 40)
- Cathy Moriarty born November 29, 1960 (age 65)
- Alanis Morissette born June 1, 1974 (age 52)
- Priscilla Morrill (1927–1994)
- Heather Morris born February 1, 1987 (age 39)
- Jessica Morris born May 16, 1979 (age 47)
- Kathryn Morris born January 18, 1969 (age 57)
- Sarah Jane Morris born April 12, 1977 (age 49)
- Jennifer Morrison born April 12, 1979 (age 47)
- Shelley Morrison (1936–2019)
- Karen Morrow born December 15, 1936 (age 89)
- Liza Morrow
- Mari Morrow born July 21, 1968 (age 58)
- Patricia Morrow born February 17, 1944 (age 82)
- Tinsley Mortimer born August 11, 1976 (age 50)
- Karla Mosley born August 27, 1981 (age 45)
- Elisabeth Moss born July 24, 1982 (age 44)
- Laura Moss born November 1, 1973 (age 53)
- Paige Moss born January 30, 1973 (age 53)
- Rachel Moss
- Bess Motta born February 10, 1958 (age 68)
- Tamera Mowry born July 6, 1978 (age 48)
- Tia Mowry born July 6, 1978 (age 48)
- Bridget Moynahan born April 28, 1971 (age 55)
- Diana Muldaur born August 19, 1938 (age 88)
- Kate Mulgrew born April 29, 1955 (age 71)
- Megan Mullally born November 12, 1958 (age 68)
- Allison Munn born October 7, 1974 (age 52)
- Olivia Munn born July 3, 1980 (age 46)
- Julia Murney born January 14, 1969 (age 57)
- Brittany Murphy (1977–2009)
- Donna Murphy born March 7, 1959 (age 67)
- Erin Murphy born June 17, 1964 (age 62)
- Mary Murphy (1931–2011)
- Morgan Murphy born October 23, 1981 (age 45)
- Jaime Murray born July 21, 1976 (age 50)

== N ==
- Kathy Najimy born February 6, 1957 (age 69)
- Niecy Nash born February 23, 1970 (age 56)
- Naturi Naughton born May 20, 1984 (age 42)
- Diane Neal born November 17, 1976 (age 50)
- Elise Neal born March 14, 1966 (age 60)
- Patricia Neal (1926-2010)
- Connie Needham born December 5, 1959 (age 66)
- Tracey Needham born March 28, 1967 (age 59)
- Stacey Nelkin born September 10, 1959 (age 67)
- Harriet Nelson (1909-1994)
- Tracy Nelson born October 25, 1963 (age 63)
- Lois Nettleton (1927-2008)
- Bebe Neuwirth born December 31, 1958 (age 67)
- Julie Newmar born August 16, 1933 (age 93)
- Irene Ng born July 28, 1974 (age 52)
- Denise Nicholas born July 12, 1944 (age 82)
- Nichelle Nichols (1932-2022)
- Rachel Nichols born January 8, 1980 (age 46)
- Julianne Nicholson born July 1, 1971 (age 55)
- Lily Nicksay born January 8, 1988 (age 38)
- Danielle Nicolet born November 24, 1973 (age 52)
- Barbara Niven born February 26, 1953 (age 73)
- Cynthia Nixon born April 9, 1966 (age 60)
- Stephanie Niznik (1967-2019)
- Minae Noji born September 30, 1973 (age 53)
- Gena Lee Nolin born November 29, 1971 (age 54)
- Kathleen Noone born January 8, 1945 (age 81)
- Christopher Norris born October 7, 1953 (age 73)
- Heather North (1945-2017)
- Sheree North (1932-2005)
- Judy Norton born January 29, 1958 (age 68)
- Brandy Norwood born February 11, 1979 (age 47)

== O ==
- Randi Oakes born August 19, 1951 (age 75)
- Jacqueline Obradors born October 6, 1966 (age 60)
- Emily O'Brien born May 28, 1985 (age 41)
- Laurie O'Brien born February 16, 1951 (age 75)
- Glynnis O'Connor born November 19, 1955 (age 71)
- Renee O'Connor born February 15, 1971 (age 55)
- Jennifer O'Dell born November 2, 1974 (age 52)
- Rosie O'Donnell born March 21, 1962 (age 64)
- Brittany O'Grady born June 2, 1996 (age 30)
- Gail O'Grady born January 23, 1963 (age 63)
- Lani O'Grady (1954-2001)
- Sandra Oh born July 20, 1971 (age 55)
- Catherine O'Hara (1954-2026)
- Jenny O'Hara born February 24, 1942 (age 84)
- Jodi Lyn O'Keefe born October 10, 1978 (age 48)
- Tricia O'Kelley born September 26, 1968 (age 58)
- Enuka Okuma born September 20, 1976 (age 50)
- Larisa Oleynik born June 7, 1981 (age 45)
- Susan Oliver (1932-1990)
- Ashley Olsen born June 13, 1986 (age 40)
- Elizabeth Olsen born February 16, 1989 (age 37)
- Mary-Kate Olsen born June 13, 1986 (age 40)
- Susan Olsen born August 14, 1961 (age 65)
- Kaitlin Olson born August 18, 1975 (age 51)
- Tatum O'Neal born November 5, 1963 (age 63)
- Lupe Ontiveros (1942-2012)
- Melissa Ordway born March 31, 1983 (age 43)
- Jenna Ortega born September 27, 2002 (age 24)
- Ana Ortiz born January 14, 1971 (age 55)
- Jaina Lee Ortiz born November 20, 1986 (age 40)
- Valery Ortiz born August 1, 1984 (age 42)
- Emily Osment born March 10, 1992 (age 34)
- Marie Osmond born October 13, 1959 (age 67)
- Cheri Oteri born September 19, 1962 (age 64)
- Annette O'Toole born April 2, 1952 (age 74)
- Park Overall born March 15, 1957 (age 69)
- Beverley Owen (1937-2019)
- Catherine Oxenberg born September 22, 1961 (age 65)

== P ==
- Judy Pace (1942–2026)
- Joanna Pacitti born October 6, 1984 (age 42)
- Kelly Packard born January 29, 1975 (age 51)
- Mikki Padilla born May 27, 1974 (age 52)
- LaWanda Page (1920–2002)
- Nicole Paggi born August 15, 1983 (age 43)
- Janis Paige (1922–2024)
- Taylour Paige born October 5, 1990 (age 36)
- Paigion born September 27, 1986 (age 40)
- Adrianne Palicki born May 6, 1983 (age 43)
- Betsy Palmer (1926–2015)
- Keke Palmer born August 26, 1993 (age 33)
- Gwyneth Paltrow born September 27, 1972 (age 54)
- Danielle Panabaker born September 19, 1987 (age 39)
- Kay Panabaker born May 2, 1990 (age 36)
- Hayden Panettiere (1989–2026)
- Grace Park born March 14, 1974 (age 52)
- Linda Park born July 9, 1978 (age 48)
- Andrea Parker born March 8, 1970 (age 56)
- Mary-Louise Parker born August 2, 1964 (age 62)
- Nicole Parker born February 21, 1978 (age 48)
- Nicole Ari Parker born October 7, 1970 (age 56)
- Paula Jai Parker born August 19, 1969 (age 57)
- Sarah Jessica Parker born March 25, 1965 (age 61)
- Dian Parkinson born November 30, 1944 (age 81)
- Megan Parlen born July 9, 1980 (age 46)
- Lana Parrilla born July 15, 1977 (age 49)
- Teyonah Parris born September 22, 1987 (age 39)
- Janel Parrish born October 30, 1988 (age 38)
- Julie Parrish (1940–2003)
- Leslie Parrish (1935–2025)
- Azure Parsons born October 5, 1984 (age 42)
- Estelle Parsons born November 20, 1927 (age 99)
- Karyn Parsons born October 8, 1966 (age 60)
- Dolly Parton (1946–2026)
- Tonye Patano born October 16, 1961 (age 65)
- Candice Patton born June 24, 1985 (age 41)
- Paula Patton born December 5, 1975 (age 50)
- Alexandra Paul born July 29, 1963 (age 63)
- Sarah Paulson born December 17, 1974 (age 51)
- Sara Paxton born April 25, 1988 (age 38)
- Jo Marie Payton born August 3, 1950 (age 76)
- Nasim Pedrad born November 18, 1981 (age 45)
- Aubrey Peeples born November 27, 1993 (age 32)
- Nia Peeples born December 10, 1961 (age 64)
- Amanda Peet born January 11, 1972 (age 54)
- Mary Beth Peil born June 25, 1940 (age 86)
- Ashley Peldon born April 2, 1984 (age 42)
- Courtney Peldon born April 13, 1981 (age 45)
- Nicola Peltz born January 9, 1995 (age 31)
- Elizabeth Peña (1959–2014)
- Piper Perabo born October 31, 1976 (age 50)
- Anna Maria Perez de Tagle born December 23, 1990 (age 35)
- Clara Perez born April 5, 1981 (age 45)
- Rosie Perez born September 6, 1964 (age 62)
- Elizabeth Perkins born November 18, 1960 (age 66)
- Rhea Perlman born March 31, 1948 (age 78)
- Pauley Perrette born March 27, 1969 (age 57)
- CJ Perry born March 24, 1985 (age 41)
- Netfa Perry born December 10, 1977 (age 48)
- Lisa Jane Persky born May 5, 1955 (age 71)
- Donna Pescow born March 24, 1954 (age 72)
- Melissa Peterman born July 1, 1971 (age 55)
- Bernadette Peters born February 28, 1948 (age 78)
- Cassandra Peterson born September 17, 1951 (age 75)
- Valarie Pettiford born July 8, 1960 (age 66)
- Madison Pettis born July 22, 1998 (age 28)
- Lori Petty born October 14, 1963 (age 63)
- Jade Pettyjohn born November 8, 2000 (age 26)
- Penny Peyser born February 9, 1951 (age 75)
- Dedee Pfeiffer born January 1, 1964 (age 62)
- Michelle Pfeiffer born April 29, 1958 (age 68)
- Jo Ann Pflug born May 2, 1940 (age 86)
- Busy Philipps born June 25, 1979 (age 47)
- Chynna Phillips born February 12, 1968 (age 58)
- Julianne Phillips born May 6, 1960 (age 66)
- Mackenzie Phillips born November 10, 1959 (age 67)
- Michelle Phillips born June 4, 1944 (age 82)
- Peg Phillips (1918–2002)
- Wendy Phillips born January 2, 1952 (age 74)
- Liberty Phoenix born July 5, 1976 (age 50)
- Rain Phoenix born November 21, 1972 (age 54)
- Summer Phoenix born December 10, 1978 (age 47)
- Alexandra Picatto born March 6, 1983 (age 43)
- Cindy Pickett born April 18, 1947 (age 79)
- Christina Pickles born February 17, 1935 (age 91)
- Julie Piekarski born January 2, 1963 (age 63)
- Amy Pietz born March 6, 1969 (age 57)
- Alison Pill born November 27, 1985 (age 40)
- Jada Pinkett Smith born September 18, 1971 (age 55)
- Tonya Pinkins born May 30, 1962 (age 64)
- Dana Plato (1964–1999)
- Aubrey Plaza born June 26, 1984 (age 42)
- Suzanne Pleshette (1937–2008)
- Martha Plimpton born November 16, 1970 (age 56)
- Eve Plumb born April 29, 1958 (age 68)
- Amanda Plummer born March 23, 1957 (age 69)
- Cathy Podewell born January 27, 1964 (age 62)
- Amy Poehler born September 16, 1971 (age 55)
- Priscilla Pointer (1924-2025)
- Sydney Tamiia Poitier born November 15, 1973 (age 53)
- Anneliese van der Pol born September 23, 1984 (age 42)
- Cheryl Pollak born August 31, 1967 (age 59)
- Teri Polo born June 1, 1969 (age 57)
- Scarlett Pomers born November 28, 1988 (age 37)
- Ellen Pompeo born November 10, 1969 (age 57)
- Natalie Portman born June 9, 1981 (age 45)
- Parker Posey born November 8, 1968 (age 58)
- Markie Post (1950–2021)
- Carol Potter born May 21, 1948 (age 78)
- Lauren Potter born May 10, 1990 (age 36)
- Monica Potter born June 30, 1971 (age 55)
- Annie Potts born October 28, 1952 (age 74)
- CCH Pounder born December 25, 1952 (age 73)
- Alexandra Powers born September 9, 1967 (age 59)
- Stefanie Powers born November 2, 1942 (age 84)
- Susan Powter born December 22, 1957 (age 68)
- Deborah Pratt born December 16, 1951 (age 74)
- Keri Lynn Pratt born September 23, 1978 (age 48)
- Kyla Pratt born September 16, 1986 (age 40)
- Victoria Pratt born December 18, 1970 (age 55)
- Ann Prentiss (1939–2010)
- Paula Prentiss born March 4, 1938 (age 88)
- Laura Prepon born March 7, 1980 (age 46)
- Priscilla Presley born May 24, 1945 (age 81)
- Jaime Pressly born July 30, 1977 (age 49)
- Sally Pressman born August 1, 1981 (age 45)
- Carrie Preston born June 21, 1967 (age 59)
- Kelly Preston (1962–2020)
- Lindsay Price born December 6, 1976 (age 49)
- Megyn Price born March 24, 1971 (age 55)
- Molly Price born December 15, 1966 (age 59)
- Pat Priest born August 15, 1936 (age 90)
- Faith Prince born August 6, 1957 (age 69)
- Victoria Principal born January 3, 1950 (age 76)
- Joan Pringle born June 2, 1945 (age 81)
- Emily Procter born October 8, 1968 (age 58)
- Jessica Prunell born April 25, 1977 (age 49)
- Rain Pryor born July 16, 1969 (age 57)
- Dorothy Provine (1935–2010)
- Devyn Puett born November 22, 1977 (age 48)
- Haley Pullos born July 10, 1998 (age 28)
- Lucy Punch born December 30, 1977 (age 48)
- Lee Purcell born June 15, 1947 (age 79)
- Linda Purl born September 2, 1955 (age 71)

== Q ==
- Maggie Q born May 22, 1979 (age 47)
- Kathleen Quinlan born November 19, 1954 (age 72)
- Martha Quinn born May 11, 1959 (age 67)
- Molly Quinn born October 8, 1993 (age 33)

== R ==
- Lily Rabe born June 29, 1982 (age 44)
- Cassidy Rae born June 7, 1976 (age 50)
- Charlotte Rae (1926–2018)
- Frances Rafferty (1922–2004)
- Deborah Raffin (1953–2012)
- Cristina Raines born February 28, 1952 (age 74)
- Natalie Raitano born October 3, 1966 (age 60)
- Mary Lynn Rajskub born June 22, 1971 (age 55)
- Sheryl Lee Ralph born December 30, 1956 (age 69)
- Leven Rambin born May 17, 1990 (age 36)
- Dania Ramirez born November 8, 1979 (age 47)
- Sara Ramirez born August 31, 1975 (age 51)
- Anne Ramsay born September 11, 1960 (age 66)
- Lexi Randall born January 1, 1980 (age 46)
- Betsy Randle born June 24, 1955 (age 71)
- Theresa Randle born December 27, 1964 (age 61)
- Claire Rankin born January 23, 1971 (age 55)
- Phylicia Rashad born June 19, 1948 (age 78)
- Melissa Rauch born June 23, 1980 (age 46)
- Raven-Symoné born December 10, 1985 (age 40)
- Elsa Raven (1929–2020)
- Kim Raver born March 15, 1969 (age 57)
- Connie Ray born July 10, 1956 (age 70)
- Ola Ray born August 26, 1960 (age 66)
- Tanika Ray born January 25, 1972 (age 54)
- Jazz Raycole born February 11, 1988 (age 38)
- Peggy Rea (1921–2011)
- Elizabeth Reaser born July 2, 1975 (age 51)
- Diona Reasonover born January 6, 1992 (age 34)
- Rebell born September 8, 1978 (age 48)
- Marge Redmond (1924–2020)
- Crystal Reed born February 6, 1985 (age 41)
- Donna Reed (1921–1986)
- Jillian Rose Reed born December 20, 1991 (age 34)
- Pamela Reed born April 2, 1949 (age 77)
- Shanna Reed born October 30, 1955 (age 71)
- Tracy Reed born October 28, 1949 (age 77)
- Rachel Reenstra born February 16, 1970 (age 56)
- Della Reese (1931–2017)
- Autumn Reeser born September 21, 1980 (age 46)
- Dana Reeve (1961–2006)
- Melissa Reeves born March 14, 1967 (age 59)
- Perrey Reeves born November 30, 1970 (age 55)
- Bridget Regan born February 3, 1982 (age 44)
- Daphne Maxwell Reid born July 13, 1948 (age 78)
- Frances Reid (1914–2010)
- Storm Reid born July 1, 2003 (age 23)
- Tara Reid born November 8, 1975 (age 51)
- Lee Remick (1935–1991)
- Leah Remini born June 15, 1970 (age 56)
- Retta born April 12, 1970 (age 56)
- Gloria Reuben born June 9, 1964 (age 62)
- Alisa Reyes born February 3, 1981 (age 45)
- Judy Reyes born November 5, 1967 (age 59)
- Debbie Reynolds (1932–2016)
- Sophie Reynolds born April 2, 1999 (age 27)
- Barbara Rhoades born March 23, 1947 (age 79)
- Erica Rhodes born April 5, 1983 (age 43)
- Jennifer Rhodes born August 17, 1947 (age 79)
- Kim Rhodes born June 7, 1969 (age 57)
- Madlyn Rhue (1935–2003)
- Marissa Ribisi born December 17, 1974 (age 51)
- Gigi Rice born March 13, 1965 (age 61)
- Ariana Richards born September 11, 1979 (age 47)
- Beah Richards (1920–2000)
- Denise Richards born February 17, 1971 (age 55)
- Kyle Richards born January 11, 1969 (age 57)
- Joely Richardson born January 9, 1965 (age 61)
- Patricia Richardson born February 23, 1951 (age 75)
- Salli Richardson born November 23, 1967 (age 58)
- Susan Richardson born March 11, 1952 (age 74)
- Nicole Richie born September 21, 1981 (age 45)
- Ashley Rickards born May 4, 1992 (age 34)
- Stefanie Ridel born May 17, 1973 (age 53)
- Lisa Rieffel born January 12, 1975 (age 51)
- Eden Riegel born January 1, 1981 (age 45)
- Cathy Rigby born December 12, 1952 (age 73)
- Amber Riley born February 15, 1986 (age 40)
- Jeannine Riley born October 1, 1940 (age 86)
- Robin Riker born October 2, 1952 (age 74)
- Molly Ringwald born February 18, 1968 (age 58)
- Lisa Rinna born July 11, 1963 (age 63)
- Kelly Ripa born October 2, 1970 (age 56)
- Krysten Ritter born December 16, 1981 (age 44)
- Thelma Ritter (1902–1969)
- Diana-Maria Riva born July 22, 1969 (age 57)
- Naya Rivera (1987–2020)
- Joan Rivers (1933–2014)
- AnnaSophia Robb born December 8, 1993 (age 32)
- Jacqueline and Joyce Robbins born September 9, 1949 (age 77)
- Ashley Roberts born September 14, 1981 (age 45)
- Doris Roberts (1925–2016)
- Emma Roberts born February 10, 1991 (age 35)
- Francesca P. Roberts born December 19, 1953 (age 72)
- Julia Roberts born October 28, 1967 (age 59)
- Tanya Roberts (1955–2021)
- Antoinette Robertson
- Britt Robertson born April 18, 1990 (age 36)
- Kathleen Robertson born July 8, 1973 (age 53)
- Louise Robey born March 14, 1960 (age 66)
- Wendy Robie born October 6, 1953 (age 73)
- Laila Robins born March 14, 1959 (age 67)
- Holly Robinson Peete born September 18, 1964 (age 62)
- Wendy Raquel Robinson born July 25, 1967 (age 59)
- Kali Rocha born December 5, 1971 (age 54)
- Tudi Roche born July 19, 1955 (age 71)
- Lela Rochon born April 17, 1964 (age 62)
- Blossom Rock (1895–1978)
- Marcia Rodd born July 8, 1940 (age 86)
- Olivia Rodrigo born February 20, 2003 (age 23)
- Gina Rodriguez born July 30, 1984 (age 42)
- Krysta Rodriguez born July 23, 1984 (age 42)
- Michelle Rodriguez born July 12, 1978 (age 48)
- Raini Rodriguez born July 1, 1993 (age 33)
- Jane A. Rogers born April 6, 1960 (age 66)
- Kasey Rogers (1925–2006)
- Kylie Rogers born February 18, 2004 (age 22)
- Mimi Rogers born January 27, 1956 (age 70)
- Suzanne Rogers born July 9, 1943 (age 83)
- Elisabeth Röhm born April 28, 1973 (age 53)
- Roxie Roker (1929–1995)
- Rose Rollins born April 30, 1981 (age 45)
- Christy Carlson Romano born March 20, 1984 (age 42)
- Stephanie Romanov born January 24, 1969 (age 57)
- Rebecca Romijn born November 6, 1972 (age 54)
- Linda Ronstadt born July 15, 1946 (age 80)
- Amelia Rose born August 1, 1986 (age 40)
- Chaley Rose born November 29, 1986 (age 39)
- Emily Rose born February 2, 1981 (age 45)
- Andrea Rosen born September 29, 1974 (age 52)
- Mackenzie Rosman born December 28, 1989 (age 36)
- Charlotte Ross born January 21, 1968 (age 58)
- Diana Ross born March 26, 1944 (age 82)
- Marion Ross born October 25, 1928 (age 98)
- Tracee Ellis Ross born October 29, 1972 (age 54)
- Victoria Rowell born May 10, 1959 (age 67)
- Kelly Rowland born February 11, 1981 (age 45)
- Gena Rowlands (1930-2024)
- Daniela Ruah born December 2, 1983 (age 42)
- Jennifer Rubin born April 3, 1962 (age 64)
- Zelda Rubinstein (1933–2010)
- Emily Rudd born February 24, 1993 (age 33)
- Sara Rue born January 26, 1979 (age 47)
- Mercedes Ruehl born February 28, 1948 (age 78)
- Debra Jo Rupp born February 24, 1951 (age 75)
- Betsy Russell born September 6, 1963 (age 63)
- Keri Russell born March 23, 1976 (age 50)
- Kimberly Russell born December 29, 1964 (age 61)
- Deanna Russo born October 17, 1979 (age 47)
- Rene Russo born February 17, 1954 (age 72)
- Kelly Rutherford born November 6, 1968 (age 58)
- Susan Ruttan born September 16, 1948 (age 78)
- Amy Ryan born May 3, 1968 (age 58)
- Debby Ryan born May 13, 1993 (age 33)
- Fran Ryan (1916–2000)
- Jeri Ryan born February 22, 1968 (age 58)
- Joan Ryan
- Lisa Dean Ryan born April 30, 1972 (age 54)
- Marisa Ryan born November 20, 1974 (age 52)
- Meg Ryan born November 19, 1961 (age 65)
- Roz Ryan born July 7, 1951 (age 75)
- Lisa Ryder born October 26, 1970 (age 56)
- Winona Ryder born October 29, 1971 (age 55)
- Emme Rylan born November 4, 1980 (age 46)

== S ==
- Sable born August 8, 1967 (age 59)
- Katee Sackhoff born April 8, 1980 (age 46)
- Jean Sagal born October 9, 1967 (age 59)
- Katey Sagal born January 19, 1954 (age 72)
- Liz Sagal born October 9, 1961 (age 65)
- Halston Sage born May 10, 1993 (age 33)
- Marlene Sai born December 14, 1941 (age 84)
- Susan Saint James born August 14, 1946 (age 80)
- Eva Marie Saint (1924–2026)
- Theresa Saldana (1954–2016)
- Zoe Saldaña born June 19, 1978 (age 48)
- Dahlia Salem born November 21, 1971 (age 55)
- Jennifer Salt born September 4, 1944 (age 82)
- Emma Samms born August 28, 1960 (age 66)
- Philece Sampler (1953–2021)
- Holly Sampson born September 4, 1973
- Skyler Samuels born April 14, 1994 (age 32)
- Laura San Giacomo born November 14, 1962 (age 64)
- Cyndee San Luis
- Ashlyn Sanchez born July 27, 1996 (age 30)
- Caitlin Sanchez born January 17, 1996 (age 30)
- Jessica Sanchez born August 4, 1995 (age 31)
- Kiele Sanchez born October 13, 1977 (age 49)
- Roselyn Sánchez born April 2, 1973 (age 53)
- Shauna Sand born September 2, 1971 (age 55)
- Ajai Sanders born October 1, 1967 (age 59)
- Erin Sanders born January 19, 1991 (age 35)
- Summer Sanders born October 13, 1972 (age 54)
- Olivia Sandoval
- Diana Sands (1934–1973)
- Renee Sands born February 15, 1974 (age 52)
- Tara Sands born September 20, 1975 (age 51)
- Isabel Sanford (1917–2004)
- Saundra Santiago born April 13, 1957 (age 69)
- Tessie Santiago born August 10, 1975 (age 51)
- Bianca Santos born July 26, 1990 (age 36)
- Cristina Saralegui born January 29, 1948 (age 78)
- Susan Sarandon born October 4, 1946 (age 80)
- Brytni Sarpy born September 21, 1987 (age 39)
- Lori Saunders born October 4, 1941 (age 85)
- Andrea Savage born February 20, 1973 (age 53)
- Jennifer Savidge born July 6, 1952 (age 74)
- Ariana Savalas born January 9, 1987 (age 39)
- Danielle Savre born August 26, 1988 (age 38)
- Morgan Saylor born October 26, 1994 (age 32)
- Allison Scagliotti born September 21, 1990 (age 36)
- Susan Scannell born February 24, 1958 (age 68)
- Diana Scarwid born August 27, 1955 (age 71)
- Kristen Schaal born January 24, 1978 (age 48)
- Wendy Schaal born July 2, 1954 (age 72)
- Felice Schachter born November 17, 1963 (age 63)
- Rebecca Schaeffer (1967–1989)
- Tarah Lynne Schaeffer born July 4, 1984 (age 42)
- Natalie Schafer (1900–1991)
- Anne Schedeen born January 8, 1949 (age 77)
- Mary Scheer born March 19, 1963 (age 63)
- Taylor Schilling born July 27, 1984 (age 42)
- Bitty Schram born July 17, 1968 (age 58)
- Carly Schroeder born October 18, 1990 (age 36)
- Amanda Schull born August 26, 1978 (age 48)
- Rebecca Schull born February 22, 1929 (age 97)
- Emily Schulman born August 17, 1977 (age 49)
- Amy Schumer born June 1, 1981 (age 45)
- Annabella Sciorra born March 29, 1960 (age 66)
- Tracy Scoggins born November 13, 1953 (age 73)
- Caterina Scorsone born October 16, 1981 (age 45)
- Amiyah Scott born January 11, 1988 (age 38)
- Ashley Scott born July 13, 1977 (age 49)
- Bonnie Scott born February 20, 1941 (age 85)
- Brenda Scott born March 15, 1943 (age 83)
- Debralee Scott (1953–2005)
- Jean Bruce Scott born February 25, 1956 (age 70)
- Jill Scott born April 4, 1972 (age 54)
- Kathryn Leigh Scott born January 26, 1945 (age 81)
- Martha Scott (1912–2003)
- Melody Thomas Scott born April 18, 1956 (age 70)
- Pippa Scott (1934-2025)
- Stefanie Scott born December 6, 1996 (age 29)
- Tasha Scott
- Veronica Scott born November 19, 1986 (age 40)
- Jocelyn Seagrave born September 9, 1968 (age 58)
- Amy Sedaris born March 29, 1961 (age 65)
- Kyra Sedgwick born August 19, 1965 (age 61)
- Paige Segal born May 14, 1987 (age 39)
- Selena (1971–1995)
- Connie Sellecca born May 25, 1955 (age 71)
- Suzanne Sena born April 2, 1963 (age 63)
- Seryah born June 20, 1995 (age 31)
- Joan Severance born December 23, 1958 (age 67)
- Chloë Sevigny born November 18, 1974 (age 52)
- Sicily Sewell born October 1, 1985 (age 41)
- Amanda Seyfried born December 3, 1985 (age 40)
- Jane Seymour born February 15, 1951 (age 75)
- Stephanie Seymour born July 23, 1968 (age 58)
- Sarah Shahi born January 10, 1980 (age 46)
- Yara Shahidi born February 10, 2000 (age 26)
- Colleen Shannon born April 14, 1978 (age 48)
- Molly Shannon born September 16, 1964 (age 62)
- Keesha Sharp born June 9, 1973 (age 53)
- China Shavers born June 16, 1977 (age 49)
- Fiona Shaw born July 10, 1958 (age 68)
- Charity Shea born December 4, 1983 (age 42)
- Ally Sheedy born June 13, 1962 (age 64)
- Deborah Shelton born November 21, 1948 (age 78)
- Kiki Shepard born July 15, 1951 (age 75)
- Vonda Shepard born July 7, 1963 (age 63)
- Cybill Shepherd born February 18, 1950 (age 76)
- Sherri Shepherd born April 22, 1967 (age 59)
- Eden Sher born December 26, 1991 (age 34)
- Nicollette Sheridan born November 21, 1963 (age 63)
- Hazel Shermet (1920–2016)
- Brooke Shields born May 31, 1965 (age 61)
- Kathy Shower
- Elisabeth Shue born October 6, 1963 (age 63)
- Jane Sibbett born November 28, 1962 (age 63)
- Gabourey Sidibe born May 6, 1983 (age 43)
- Denny Siegel
- Jamie-Lynn Sigler born May 15, 1981 (age 45)
- Cynthia Sikes Yorkin born January 2, 1954 (age 72)
- Karen Sillas born June 5, 1963 (age 63)
- Leslie Silva born April 21, 1968 (age 58)
- Laura Silverman born June 10, 1966 (age 60)
- Sarah Silverman born December 1, 1970 (age 55)
- Cathy Silvers born May 27, 1961 (age 65)
- Alicia Silverstone born October 4, 1976 (age 50)
- Jean Simmons (1929–2010)
- Kimora Lee Simmons born May 4, 1975 (age 51)
- Lili Simmons born July 23, 1993 (age 33)
- Jazmyn Simon born December 30, 1980 (age 45)
- Hannah Simone born August 3, 1980 (age 46)
- Ashlee Simpson born October 3, 1984 (age 42)
- Jessica Simpson born July 10, 1980 (age 46)
- Molly Sims born May 25, 1973 (age 53)
- Sadie Sink born April 16, 2002 (age 24)
- Madge Sinclair (1938–1995)
- Mary Sinclair (1922-2000)
- Lori Singer born November 6, 1957 (age 69)
- Marina Sirtis born March 29, 1955 (age 71)
- Jennifer Sky born October 13, 1976 (age 50)
- Ione Skye born September 4, 1970 (age 56)
- Erika Slezak born August 5, 1946 (age 80)
- Tina Sloan born February 1, 1943 (age 83)
- Lindsay Sloane born August 8, 1977 (age 49)
- Anna Slotky born June 30, 1981 (age 45)
- Amy Smart born March 26, 1976 (age 50)
- Jean Smart born September 13, 1951 (age 75)
- Tava Smiley born October 19, 1971 (age 55)
- Anna Deavere Smith born September 18, 1950 (age 76)
- Anna Nicole Smith (1967–2007)
- Brit Smith born December 3, 1985 (age 40)
- Brooke Smith born May 22, 1967 (age 59)
- Hillary B. Smith born May 25, 1957 (age 69)
- Jaclyn Smith born October 26, 1945 (age 81)
- Jada Pinkett Smith born September 18, 1971 (age 55)
- Kellita Smith born January 15, 1969 (age 57)
- Martha Smith born October 16, 1952 (age 74)
- Phyllis Smith born August 15, 1949 (age 77)
- Shawnee Smith born July 3, 1969 (age 57)
- Shelley Smith (1952–2023)
- Tasha Smith born February 28, 1971 (age 55)
- Toukie Smith born September 25, 1952 (age 74)
- Willow Smith born October 31, 2000 (age 26)
- Yeardley Smith born July 3, 1964 (age 62)
- Jan Smithers born July 3, 1949 (age 77)
- Jurnee Smollett born October 1, 1986 (age 40)
- Cobie Smulders born April 3, 1982 (age 44)
- Carrie Snodgress (1945–2004)
- Brittany Snow born March 9, 1986 (age 40)
- Liza Snyder born March 20, 1968 (age 58)
- Leelee Sobieski born June 10, 1983 (age 43)
- Rena Sofer born December 2, 1968 (age 57)
- Sonja Sohn born May 9, 1964 (age 62)
- Marla Sokoloff born December 19, 1980 (age 45)
- Brett Somers (1924–2007)
- Suzanne Somers (1946–2023)
- Bonnie Somerville born February 24, 1974 (age 52)
- Phyllis Somerville (1943–2020)
- Julie Sommars born April 15, 1940 (age 86)
- Brenda Song born March 27, 1988 (age 38)
- Louise Sorel born August 6, 1940 (age 86)
- Nancy Sorel born May 14, 1964 (age 62)
- Arleen Sorkin (1955–2023)
- Mira Sorvino born September 28, 1967 (age 59)
- Ann Sothern (1909-2001)
- Jordin Sparks born December 22, 1989 (age 36)
- Britney Spears born December 2, 1981 (age 44)
- Jamie Lynn Spears born April 4, 1991 (age 35)
- Tori Spelling born May 16, 1973 (age 53)
- Abigail Spencer born August 4, 1981 (age 45)
- Danielle Spencer (1965-2025)
- Laura Spencer born May 8, 1986 (age 40)
- Octavia Spencer born May 25, 1970 (age 56)
- Wendie Jo Sperber (1958–2005)
- Jordana Spiro born April 12, 1977 (age 49)
- Spivy (1906–1971)
- June Squibb November 6, 1929 (age 97)
- Gina St. John
- Jill St. John born August 19, 1940 (age 86)
- Michelle Stafford born September 14, 1965 (age 61)
- Nancy Stafford born June 5, 1954 (age 72)
- Lisa Stahl born March 19, 1965 (age 61)
- Darby Stanchfield born April 29, 1971 (age 55)
- Bern Nadette Stanis born December 22, 1953 (age 72)
- Florence Stanley (1924–2003)
- Barbara Stanwyck (1907–1990)
- Jean Stapleton (1923–2013)
- Maureen Stapleton (1925–2006)
- Chrishell Stause born July 21, 1981 (age 45)
- Amy Steel born May 3, 1960 (age 66)
- Karen Steele (1931–1988)
- Jessica Steen born December 19, 1965 (age 60)
- Nancy Steen born January 31, 1950 (age 76)
- Mary Steenburgen born February 8, 1953 (age 73)
- Gwen Stefani born October 3, 1969 (age 57)
- Hailee Steinfeld born December 11, 1996 (age 29)
- Amandla Stenberg born October 23, 1998 (age 28)
- Mindy Sterling born July 11, 1953 (age 73)
- Tisha Sterling born December 10, 1944 (age 81)
- Beth Ostrosky Stern born July 15, 1972 (age 54)
- Dawn Stern born January 1, 1966 (age 60)
- Frances Sternhagen (1930-2023)
- Amber Stevens West born October 7, 1986 (age 40)
- Connie Stevens born August 8, 1938 (age 88)
- Katie Stevens born December 8, 1992 (age 33)
- Kaye Stevens (1932–2011)
- Naomi Stevens (1926–2018)
- Pat Stevens (1945–2010)
- Rise Stevens (1913–2013)
- Stella Stevens (1938–2023)
- Cynthia Stevenson born August 2, 1962 (age 64)
- Alana Stewart born May 18, 1945 (age 81)
- Julia Stiles born March 28, 1981 (age 45)
- Debra Stipe born May 29, 1962 (age 64)
- Barbara Stock born May 26, 1956 (age 70)
- Trinitee Stokes born April 12, 2006 (age 20)
- Angie Stone (1961-2025)
- Emma Stone born November 6, 1988 (age 38)
- Gabrielle Stone born November 20, 1988 (age 38)
- Jennifer Stone born February 12, 1993 (age 33)
- Kirsten Storms born April 8, 1984 (age 42)
- Madeleine Stowe born August 18, 1958 (age 68)
- Sal Stowers born January 20, 1986 (age 40)
- Susan Strasberg (1938–1999)
- Robin Strasser born May 7, 1945 (age 81)
- Karen Strassman born June 5, 1966 (age 60)
- Marcia Strassman (1948–2014)
- Meryl Streep born June 22, 1949 (age 77)
- Gail Strickland born May 18, 1945 (age 81)
- KaDee Strickland born December 14, 1975 (age 50)
- Sherry Stringfield born June 24, 1967 (age 59)
- Brenda Strong born March 25, 1960 (age 66)
- Cecily Strong born February 8, 1984 (age 42)
- Tara Strong born February 12, 1973 (age 53)
- Sally Struthers born July 28, 1947 (age 79)
- Anna Stuart born November 1, 1948 (age 78)
- Barbara Stuart (1930–2011)
- Mary Stuart (1926–2002)
- Maxine Stuart (1918–2013)
- Shannon Sturges born January 3, 1968 (age 58)
- Brooklyn Sudano born January 5, 1981 (age 45)
- Kelly Sullivan born February 3, 1978 (age 48)
- Nancy Sullivan born October 17, 1969 (age 57)
- Nicole Sullivan born April 21, 1970 (age 56)
- Susan Sullivan born November 18, 1942 (age 84)
- Cree Summer born July 7, 1969 (age 57)
- Tika Sumpter born June 20, 1980 (age 46)
- Caroline Sunshine born September 5, 1995 (age 31)
- Kristine Sutherland born April 17, 1955 (age 71)
- Carol Sutton (1944–2020)
- Hilary Swank born July 30, 1974 (age 52)
- Gloria Swanson (1899–1983)
- Jackie Swanson born June 25, 1963 (age 63)
- Jandi Swanson
- Kristy Swanson born December 19, 1969 (age 56)
- Melinda Sward born June 10, 1979 (age 47)
- Alison Sweeney born September 19, 1976 (age 50)
- Julia Sweeney born October 10, 1959 (age 67)
- Sydney Sweeney born September 12, 1997 (age 29)
- Rachel Sweet born July 28, 1962 (age 64)
- Madylin Sweeten born June 27, 1991 (age 35)
- Jodie Sweetin born January 19, 1982 (age 44)
- Inga Swenson (1932–2023)
- Taylor Swift born December 13, 1989 (age 36)
- JoAnna Garcia Swisher born August 10, 1979 (age 47)
- Loretta Swit (1937-2025)
- Brenda Sykes born June 25, 1949 (age 77)
- Wanda Sykes born March 7, 1964 (age 62)

== T ==
- Rita Taggart
- Nita Talbot born August 8, 1930 (age 96)
- Patricia Tallman born September 4, 1957 (age 69)
- Amber Tamblyn born May 14, 1983 (age 43)
- Barbara Tarbuck (1942-2016)
- Katelyn Tarver born November 2, 1989 (age 37)
- Jill Tasker born September 13, 1964 (age 62)
- Sharon Tate (1943-1969)
- Leigh Taylor-Young born January 25, 1945 (age 81)
- Christine Taylor born July 30, 1971 (age 55)
- Clarice Taylor (1917-2011)
- Daniella Taylor born June 13, 2000 (age 26)
- Elizabeth Taylor (1932-2011)
- Holland Taylor born January 14, 1943 (age 83)
- Jennifer Taylor born April 19, 1972 (age 54)
- Renée Taylor born March 19, 1933 (age 93)
- Aimee Teegarden born October 10, 1989 (age 37)
- Shirley Temple (1928-2014)
- Taryn Terrell born December 28, 1985 (age 40)
- Charlize Theron born August 7, 1975 (age 51)
- Lauren Tewes born October 26, 1953 (age 73)
- Tia Texada
- Brynn Thayer
- Brooke Theiss born October 23, 1969 (age 57)
- Jodi Thelen born June 12, 1962 (age 64)
- Tiffani Thiessen born January 23, 1974 (age 52)
- Lynne Thigpen (1948-2003)
- Melody Thomas Scott born April 18, 1956 (age 70)
- Betty Thomas born July 27, 1947 (age 79)
- Heather Thomas born September 8, 1957 (age 69)
- Marlo Thomas born November 21, 1937 (age 89)
- Michelle Thomas (1968-1998)
- Andrea Thompson born January 6, 1960 (age 66)
- Lea Thompson born May 31, 1961 (age 65)
- Linda Thompson born May 23, 1950 (age 76)
- Sada Thompson (1927-2011)
- Scottie Thompson
- Susanna Thompson born January 27, 1958 (age 68)
- Tessa Thompson born October 3, 1983 (age 43)
- Tracie Thoms
- Courtney Thorne-Smith
- Bella Thorne born October 8, 1997 (age 29)
- Callie Thorne
- Tiffany Thornton born February 14, 1986 (age 40)
- Rachel Ticotin born November 1, 1958 (age 68)
- Maura Tierney born February 3, 1965 (age 61)
- Pam Tillis born July 24, 1957 (age 69)
- Jennifer Tilly born September 16, 1958 (age 68)
- Meg Tilly born February 14, 1960 (age 66)
- Charlene Tilton born December 1, 1958 (age 67)
- Tinashe born February 6, 1993 (age 33)
- Ashley Tisdale born July 2, 1985 (age 41)
- Jennifer Tisdale born September 18, 1981 (age 45)
- Brianne Tju
- Haley Tju born February 15, 2001 (age 25)
- Becca Tobin born January 18, 1986 (age 40)
- Jacqueline Toboni born February 18, 1992 (age 34)
- Beverly Todd born July 11, 1946 (age 80)
- Hallie Todd born January 7, 1962 (age 64)
- Gina Tognoni born November 28, 1973 (age 52)
- Berlinda Tolbert born November 4, 1949 (age 77)
- Judy Toll (1958-2002)
- Allison Tolman
- Amy Tolsky born December 19, 1961 (age 64)
- Susan Tolsky (1943-2022)
- Heather Tom born November 4, 1975 (age 51)
- Lauren Tom born August 4, 1961 (age 65)
- Nicholle Tom born March 23, 1978 (age 48)
- Concetta Tomei born December 30, 1945 (age 80)
- Marisa Tomei born December 4, 1964 (age 61)
- Tamlyn Tomita born January 27, 1966 (age 60)
- Lily Tomlin born September 1, 1939 (age 87)
- LeShay Tomlinson
- Eve Torres born August 21, 1984 (age 42)
- Gina Torres born April 25, 1969 (age 57)
- Beth Toussaint born September 25, 1962 (age 64)
- Lorraine Toussaint born April 4, 1960 (age 66)
- Constance Towers born May 20, 1933 (age 93)
- Jill Townsend
- Tammy Townsend born August 17, 1970 (age 56)
- Michelle Trachtenberg (1985-2025)
- Mary Ellen Trainor (1952-2015)
- Thalia Tran
- Thuy Trang (1973-2001)
- Nancy Travis born September 21, 1961 (age 65)
- Stacey Travis born August 29, 1964 (age 62)
- Ellen Travolta born October 6, 1939 (age 87)
- Margaret Travolta
- Terri Treas
- Mary Treen (1907-1989)
- Anne Tremko born February 28, 1968 (age 58)
- Paula Trickey born March 27, 1966 (age 60)
- Jeanne Tripplehorn born June 10, 1963 (age 63)
- Rachel True born November 15, 1966 (age 60)
- Hillary Tuck born July 1, 1978 (age 48)
- Jessica Tuck born February 19, 1963 (age 63)
- Deborah Tucker
- Lisa Tucker born June 13, 1989 (age 37)
- Sophie Tucker (1886-1966)
- Bitsie Tulloch
- Tamara Tunie born March 14, 1959 (age 67)
- Robin Tunney born June 19, 1972 (age 54)
- Paige Turco born May 17, 1965 (age 61)
- Ann Turkel
- Bree Turner born March 10, 1977 (age 49)
- Janine Turner born December 6, 1962 (age 63)
- Karri Turner born December 21, 1966 (age 59)
- Kathleen Turner born June 19, 1954 (age 72)
- Lana Turner (1921-1995)
- Ruby Rose Turner
- Tina Turner (1939-2023)
- Aida Turturro born September 25, 1962 (age 64)
- Aisha Tyler born September 18, 1970 (age 56)
- Liv Tyler born July 1, 1977 (age 49)
- Hunter Tylo born July 3, 1962 (age 64)
- Cicely Tyson (1924-2021)

== U ==
- Alanna Ubach born October 3, 1975 (age 51)
- Leslie Uggams born May 25, 1943 (age 83)
- Tracey Ullman born December 30, 1959 (age 66)
- Kim Johnston Ulrich born March 24, 1955 (age 71)
- Brittany Underwood born July 6, 1988 (age 38)
- Carrie Underwood born March 10, 1983 (age 43)
- Gabrielle Union born October 22, 1972 (age 54)
- Kate Upton born June 10, 1992 (age 34)
- Jenna Ushkowitz born April 28, 1986 (age 40)

== V ==
- Brenda Vaccaro born November 18, 1939 (age 87)
- Sigrid Valdis (1935-2007)
- Nancy Valen born December 16, 1965 (age 60)
- Brooke Valentine born October 4, 1984 (age 42)
- Cindy Valentine born August 22, 1975 (age 51)
- Grace Valentine (1884-1964)
- Karen Valentine born May 27, 1947 (age 79)
- Dana Valery born July 15, 1944 (age 82)
- Joan Van Ark born June 16, 1943 (age 83)
- Joyce Van Patten born March 9, 1934 (age 92)
- Deborah Van Valkenburgh born August 29, 1952 (age 74)
- Dorothy Van (1928-2002)
- Vivian Vance (1909-1979)
- Kirsten Vangsness born July 7, 1972 (age 54)
- Denise Vasi born March 1, 1983 (age 43)
- Liz Vassey born August 9, 1972 (age 54)
- Sofia Vassilieva born October 22, 1992 (age 34)
- Countess Vaughn born August 8, 1978 (age 48)
- Terri J. Vaughn born October 16, 1969 (age 57)
- Zelina Vega born December 27, 1990 (age 35)
- Lauren Vélez born November 2, 1964 (age 62)
- Diane Venora born August 10, 1952 (age 74)
- Elena Verdugo (1925-2017)
- Sofia Vergara born July 10, 1972 (age 54)
- Kate Vernon born April 21, 1961 (age 65)
- Christina Vidal born November 18, 1981 (age 45)
- Lisa Vidal born June 13, 1965 (age 61)
- Thea Vidale born November 20, 1956 (age 70)
- Tracy Vilar born April 12, 1968 (age 58)
- Nana Visitor born July 26, 1957 (age 69)
- Vitamin C born July 20, 1969 (age 57)
- Darlene Vogel born October 25, 1962 (age 64)
- Rita Volk born September 3, 1990 (age 36)
- Nedra Volz (1908-2003)
- Jenna von Oÿ born May 2, 1977 (age 49)
- Lark Voorhies born March 25, 1974 (age 52)

== W ==
- Caitlin Wachs born March 15, 1989 (age 37)
- Jill Wagner born January 13, 1979 (age 47)
- Kristina Wagner born October 30, 1962 (age 64)
- Lindsay Wagner born June 22, 1949 (age 77)
- Natasha Gregson Wagner born September 29, 1970 (age 56)
- Janet Waldo (1919–2016)
- Suzanne Waldron (1931–1982)
- Sonya Walger born June 6, 1974 (age 52)
- Ally Walker born August 25, 1961 (age 65)
- Arnetia Walker
- Bree Walker born February 26, 1953 (age 73)
- Dreama Walker born June 20, 1986 (age 40)
- Marcy Walker born November 26, 1961 (age 64)
- Nancy Walker (1922-1992)
- Tonja Walker born September 19, 1960 (age 66)
- Dee Wallace born December 19, 1948 (age 77)
- Marcia Wallace (1942–2013)
- Kate Walsh born October 13, 1967 (age 59)
- Maiara Walsh born February 18, 1988 (age 38)
- Jessica Walter (1941–2021)
- Lisa Ann Walter born August 3, 1963 (age 63)
- Laurie Walters born January 8, 1947 (age 79)
- Melora Walters born October 21, 1959 (age 67)
- Susan Walters born September 28, 1963 (age 63)
- Peggy Walton-Walker
- Jess Walton born February 18, 1946 (age 80)
- Maitland Ward born February 3, 1977 (age 49)
- Megan Ward born September 24, 1969 (age 57)
- Rachel Ward born September 12, 1957 (age 69)
- Sela Ward born July 11, 1956 (age 70)
- Marsha Warfield born March 5, 1954 (age 72)
- Estella Warren born December 23, 1978 (age 47)
- Karle Warren born February 8, 1992 (age 34)
- Kiersten Warren born November 4, 1965 (age 61)
- Lesley Ann Warren born August 16, 1946 (age 80)
- Kerry Washington born January 31, 1977 (age 49)
- Carlene Watkins born June 4, 1952 (age 74)
- Michaela Watkins born December 14, 1971 (age 54)
- Cynthia Watros born September 2, 1968 (age 58)
- Vernee Watson-Johnson born September 28, 1949 (age 77)
- Rolonda Watts born July 12, 1959 (age 67)
- Kim Wayans born October 16, 1961 (age 65)
- Shawn Weatherly born July 24, 1959 (age 67)
- Patty Weaver
- Sigourney Weaver born October 8, 1949 (age 77)
- Bresha Webb born May 6, 1984 (age 42)
- Chloe Webb born June 25, 1956 (age 70)
- Haley Webb born November 25, 1985 (age 40)
- Jane Webb (1925–2010)
- Lucy Webb
- Veronica Webb born February 25, 1965 (age 61)
- Ann Wedgeworth (1934–2017)
- Lauren Weedman born March 5, 1969 (age 57)
- Liza Weil born June 5, 1977 (age 49)
- Malina Weissman born March 12, 2003 (age 23)
- Rachel Weisz born March 7, 1970 (age 56)
- Raquel Welch (1940–2023)
- Olivia Scott Welch born February 10, 1998 (age 28)
- Tuesday Weld born August 27, 1943 (age 83)
- Dawn Wells (1938–2020)
- Tracy Wells born March 13, 1971 (age 55)
- Ming-Na Wen born November 20, 1963 (age 63)
- Ali Wentworth born January 12, 1965 (age 61)
- Maura West born April 27, 1972 (age 54)
- Natalie West born January 23, 1956 (age 70)
- Celia Weston born December 14, 1951 (age 74)
- Patricia Wettig born December 4, 1951 (age 74)
- Suzanne Whang (1962–2019)
- Dana Wheeler-Nicholson born October 9, 1960 (age 66)
- Ellen Wheeler born October 9, 1961 (age 65)
- Maggie Wheeler born August 7, 1961 (age 65)
- Jill Whelan born September 29, 1966 (age 60)
- Lisa Whelchel born May 29, 1963 (age 63)
- Betty White (1922–2021)
- Karen Malina White born July 7, 1965 (age 61)
- Michole Briana White born May 29, 1969 (age 57)
- Lynn Whitfield born February 15, 1953 (age 73)
- Kym Whitley born June 7, 1961 (age 65)
- Mae Whitman born June 9, 1988 (age 38)
- Grace Lee Whitney (1930–2015)
- Emily Wickersham born April 26, 1984 (age 42)
- Mary Wickes (1910–1995)
- Kathleen Widdoes born March 21, 1939 (age 87)
- Dianne Wiest born March 28, 1948 (age 78)
- Laura Slade Wiggins born August 8, 1988 (age 38)
- Kristen Wiig born August 22, 1973 (age 53)
- Collin Wilcox (1935–2009)
- Lisa Wilcox born April 27, 1964 (age 62)
- Abby Wilde born February 25, 1989 (age 37)
- Olivia Wilde born March 10, 1984 (age 42)
- Kathleen Wilhoite born June 29, 1964 (age 62)
- Allison Williams born April 13, 1988 (age 38)
- Ashley Williams born November 12, 1978 (age 48)
- Bergen Williams (1959–2021)
- Cara Williams (1925–2021)
- Caroline Williams born March 27, 1957 (age 69)
- Cindy Williams (1947–2023)
- Jessica White born July 31, 1989 (age 37)
- JoBeth Williams born December 6, 1948 (age 77)
- Kelli Williams born June 8, 1970 (age 56)
- Kellie Shanygne Williams born March 22, 1976 (age 50)
- Kiely Williams born July 9, 1986 (age 40)
- Kimberly Williams-Paisley born September 14, 1971 (age 55)
- Malinda Williams born September 24, 1970 (age 56)
- Melissa L. Williams born August 31, 1987 (age 39)
- Michelle Williams born September 9, 1980 (age 46)
- Michelle Williams (singer) born July 23, 1979 (age 47)
- Nafessa Williams born December 4, 1989 (age 36)
- Natashia Williams born August 2, 1978 (age 48)
- Porsha Williams born June 22, 1981 (age 45)
- Tonya Williams born July 12, 1958 (age 68)
- Vanessa A. Williams born May 12, 1963 (age 63)
- Vanessa L. Williams born March 18, 1963 (age 63)
- Wendy Williams born July 18, 1964 (age 62)
- Bree Williamson born December 28, 1979 (age 46)
- Alicia Leigh Willis born March 1, 1978 (age 48)
- Katherine Willis born May 2, 1971 (age 55)
- Rumer Willis born August 16, 1988 (age 38)
- Beverly Wills (1933–1963)
- Sheila Wills born August 11, 1947 (age 79)
- Casey Wilson born October 24, 1980 (age 46)
- Chandra Wilson born August 27, 1969 (age 57)
- Debra Wilson born April 26, 1962 (age 64)
- Mara Wilson born July 24, 1987 (age 39)
- Mary Louise Wilson born November 12, 1931 (age 95)
- Melanie Wilson born October 14, 1960 (age 66)
- Nancy Wilson (1937–2018)
- Peta Wilson born November 18, 1970 (age 56)
- Rita Wilson born October 26, 1956 (age 70)
- Sheree J. Wilson born December 12, 1958 (age 67)
- Yvette Wilson (1964–2012)
- Deborah Joy Winans born September 6, 1983 (age 43)
- Camille Winbush born February 9, 1990 (age 36)
- Amy Winfrey
- Oprah Winfrey born January 29, 1954 (age 72)
- Leslie Wing born September 16, 1963 (age 63)
- Debra Winger born May 16, 1955 (age 71)
- Mare Winningham born May 16, 1959 (age 67)
- Katheryn Winnick born December 17, 1977 (age 48)
- Marissa Jaret Winokur born February 2, 1973 (age 53)
- Mary Elizabeth Winstead born November 28, 1984 (age 41)
- Hattie Winston born March 3, 1945 (age 81)
- Ariel Winter born January 28, 1998 (age 28)
- Reese Witherspoon born March 22, 1976 (age 50)
- Alicia Witt born August 21, 1975 (age 51)
- Karen Witter
- Meg Wittner born September 19, 1950 (age 76)
- Annie Wood born February 10, 1971 (age 55)
- Bebe Wood born August 8, 2001 (age 25)
- Evan Rachel Wood born September 7, 1987 (age 39)
- Jacqueline MacInnes Wood born April 17, 1987 (age 39)
- Lana Wood born March 1, 1946 (age 80)
- Natalie Wood (1938–1981)
- Peggy Wood (1892–1978)
- Alfre Woodard born November 8, 1952 (age 74)
- Charlayne Woodard born December 29, 1953 (age 72)
- Pat Woodell (1944–2015)
- Lauren Woodland born October 28, 1977 (age 49)
- Shailene Woodley born November 15, 1991 (age 35)
- Barbara Alyn Woods born March 11, 1962 (age 64)
- Nan Woods born June 21, 1966 (age 60)
- Renn Woods born January 1, 1958 (age 68)
- Joanne Woodward born February 27, 1930 (age 96)
- Shannon Woodward born December 17, 1984 (age 41)
- Jo Anne Worley born September 6, 1937 (age 89)
- Aloma Wright born March 10, 1950 (age 76)
- Laura Wright born September 11, 1970 (age 56)
- N'Bushe Wright born September 20, 1970 (age 56)
- Robin Wright born April 8, 1966 (age 60)
- Becky Wu
- Constance Wu born March 22, 1982 (age 44)
- Kristy Wu born October 11, 1982 (age 44)
- Lisa Wu born January 23, 1973 (age 53)
- Kari Wuhrer born April 28, 1967 (age 59)
- Jane Wyatt (1910–2006)
- Sofia Wylie born January 7, 2004 (age 22)
- Meg Wyllie (1917–2002)
- Jane Wyman (1917–2007)
- Victoria Wyndham born May 22, 1945 (age 81)
- Amanda Wyss born November 24, 1960 (age 65)

== Y ==
- Claire Yarlett born February 15, 1965 (age 61)
- Celeste Yarnall (1944-2018)
- Amy Yasbeck born September 12, 1962 (age 64)
- Breanna Yde born June 11, 2003 (age 23)
- Trisha Yearwood born September 19, 1964 (age 62)
- Ashlynn Yennie born May 15, 1985 (age 41)
- Michelle Yeoh born August 6, 1962 (age 64)
- Erica Yohn (1928-2019)
- Francine York (1938-2017)
- Kathleen York
- Morgan York born January 18, 1993 (age 33)
- Tina Yothers born May 5, 1973 (age 53)
- Bellamy Young born February 19, 1970 (age 56)
- Heather Young born April 1, 1945 (age 81)
- Shelby Young born April 8, 1992 (age 34)
- Barrie Youngfellow (1946-2022)

== Z ==
- Grace Zabriskie born May 17, 1941 (age 85)
- Lisa Zane born April 5, 1961 (age 65)
- Zarah
- Nora Zehetner born February 5, 1981 (age 45)
- Heidi Zeigler born March 26, 1979 (age 47)
- Renée Zellweger born April 25, 1969 (age 57)
- Jacklyn Zeman (1953-2023)
- Zendaya born September 1, 1996 (age 30)
- Mackenzie Ziegler born June 4, 2004 (age 22)
- Maddie Ziegler born September 30, 2002 (age 24)
- Madeline Zima born September 16, 1985 (age 41)
- Vanessa Zima born December 17, 1986 (age 39)
- Yvonne Zima born January 16, 1989 (age 37)
- Stephanie Zimbalist born October 8, 1956 (age 70)
- Constance Zimmer born October 11, 1970 (age 56)
- Kim Zimmer born February 2, 1955 (age 71)
- Arianne Zucker born June 3, 1974 (age 52)
- Daphne Zuniga born October 28, 1962 (age 64)

== See also ==
- Lists of actors
- Lists of Americans
