= Mimi Kennedy =

American actress, author, and activist (born 1948)

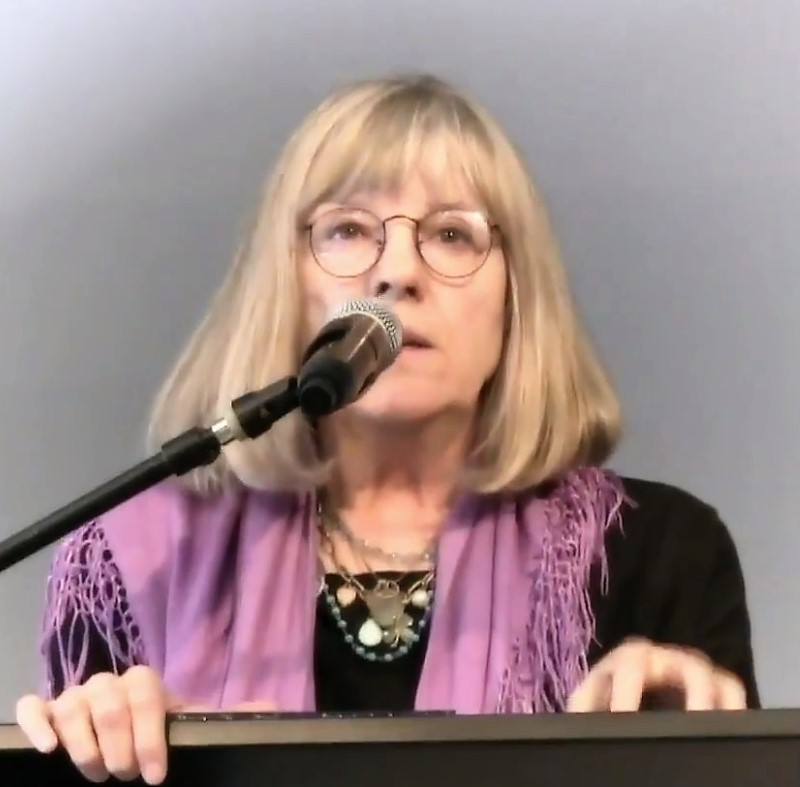
- Kennedy speaks at the National Election Integrity Conference in 2017.
- Born: Mary Claire Kennedy; September 25, 1948 (age 78); Rochester, New York, U.S.
- Occupations: Actress, writer
- Years active: 1970–present
- Spouse: Larry Dilg (m. 1978)
- Children: 2

Mary Claire "Mimi" Kennedy (born September 25, 1948) is an American actress, author and activist. Best known for her roles in television sitcoms, Kennedy co-starred in numerous short-lived sitcoms before her role as Ruth Sloan on Homefront (1991–93). She received wider recognition with her roles in the Chuck Lorre-created sitcoms Dharma & Greg (1997–2002) and Mom (2013–2021). For her performance in the latter, Kennedy received a nomination for the Critics' Choice Television Award for Best Guest Performer in a Comedy Series. Kennedy has also appeared in various films, including Pump Up the Volume (1990), Erin Brockovich (2000), In the Loop (2009), Due Date (2010), Midnight in Paris (2011) and The Five-Year Engagement (2012).

== Early life ==
Kennedy was born in Rochester, New York, the daughter of Nancy Helen (née Colgan) and Daniel Gerald Kennedy. She got her start in theater with the Rochester Community Players, appearing in Agatha Christie's Spider Web in October 1960 when she was 12 years old. She graduated in 1966 from Our Lady of Mercy High School. In the 1970s, she was in the musical Rhinegold, featuring songs by her friend Jim Steinman. She attended Smith College.

== Career ==
Kennedy was a member of the cast of The National Lampoon Show, directed by John Belushi, who also starred in it. She auditioned for Saturday Night Live, but lost to Jane Curtin.

She appeared in the Broadway musical Grease and in 1977 landed a part in the short-lived variety series 3 Girls 3, with Debbie Allen and Ellen Foley. She later played the role of Stockard Channing's sister in the short-lived Stockard Channing in Just Friends (1979), and she was a regular on The Big Show (1980). During the 1980s, she starred in a number of short-lived sitcoms, including The Two of Us (1981–82), Spencer (1984–85) and Family Man (1988). She also co-starred in the sitcom Joe's Life (1993).

Kennedy made her dramatic turn with a supporting role in the critically acclaimed Homefront. The series ran from 1991 to 1993. She later was a regular on Savannah (1996–97), playing the rich socialite step-mother of Shannon Sturges' character. After the series was canceled, she was cast in Pacific Palisades. This series also was canceled after a single season. In 1997, Kennedy returned to comedy roles playing Dharma's mother, Abby O'Neil, on the sitcom Dharma & Greg (1997–2002).

During the 2000s, Kennedy had many guest-starring roles on television, appearing on Grey's Anatomy, House, ER, Scandal, In Plain Sight, Drop Dead Diva and Veep. She also had a number of supporting film roles, appearing in Man in the Chair, In the Loop, Due Date, Midnight in Paris and The Five-Year Engagement. In 2013, Kennedy joined the cast of the sitcom Mom playing Marjorie, the twelve-step sponsor of the lead characters. She received a Critics' Choice Television Award nomination for her performance on the show. She became a series regular on the second season.

Early in 2022, Kennedy posted a video in which she and spouse Larry Dilg recall their friendships with Jim Steinman and, by extension, with Meatloaf. In the video, Kennedy shares details of her months touring with The National Lampoon Show.

== Personal life ==
Kennedy is involved in several progressive activist causes, including Progressive Democrats of America for which she serves as chairwoman of the board. She is a regular contributor to the LA Progressive. Her mid-life memoir Taken to the Stage: The Education of an Actress was published in 1996. In 2023, an author-read audiobook edition appeared.

== Filmography ==
=== Film ===
Year	Title	Role	Notes
1981	Thin Ice	Arlene	Television film
1986	Mr. Boogedy	Eloise Davis	Television film
1987	Bride of Boogedy	Eloise Davis	Television film
1987	Baby Girl Scott	Jane	
1989	Chances Are	Sally	
1989	Immediate Family	Eli's Mom	
1990	Pump Up the Volume	Marla Hunter	
1990	A Promise to Keep	Annie	Television film
1991	Sins of the Mother	Karen Turner	Television film
1992	Death Becomes Her	Second Woman	
1994	Flashfire	Kate Cantrell	
1997	Taken	Judy Gold	Short film
1997	Buddy	Mrs. Bunny Bowman	
1998	Reasons of the Heart	Celia Barton	
2000	Erin Brockovich	Laura Ambrosino	
2007	Man in the Chair	Judy Kincaid	Method Fest Independent Film Festival Award for Best Ensemble Cast
2008	A Single Woman	Storyteller	
2009	In the Loop	Karen Clark	
2009	The Three Gifts	Rita Green	Television film
2010	Due Date	Sarah's Mom	
2011	Life of Lemon	Louise Phillips	
2011	Midnight in Paris	Helen	Nominated — Phoenix Film Critics Society Award for Best Ensemble Acting
2012	The Five-Year Engagement	Carol Solomon	
2013	Expecting	Dr. Grayson	
2013	In Sickness and in Health	Carol	
2014	Squatters	Judge Janovich	
2020	Eat Wheaties!	Edna Straw	
TBA	Going Places	Sue	Filming

=== Television ===
Year	Title	Role	Notes
1977	3 Girls 3	Self	Regular
1978	Getting Married	Jenny	TV movie
1979	Family	Karen	Episode: "Going Straight"
1979	Just Friends	Victoria Chasen	13 episodes
1979	Dance Fever	Guest Judge	1 episode
1981	The Two of Us	Nan Gallagher	20 episodes
1984	American Playhouse	Sophisticated urbanite	Episode: "Popular Neurotics"
1984	St. Elsewhere	Lois Wegener	2 episodes
1984–1985	Spencer	Doris Winger	13 episodes
1985	Robert Kennedy and His Times	Pat Kennedy	TV mini-series, 3 episodes
1985	Night Court	Patty Douglas	Episode: "Married Alive"
1986	The Twilight Zone	Christie Copperfield	Segment "Aqua Vita"; Episode: "What Are Friends For?/Aqua Vita"
1986	ABC Weekend Specials	Mrs. Gridley	Episode: "The Mouse and the Motorcycle"
1986	Tall Tales & Legends	Ben's Mom	Episode: "Davy Crockett"
1988	Family Man	Andrea Tobin	7 episodes
1989	Tales from the Crypt	Distraught Woman	Episode: "The Man Who Was Death"
1989	Homeroom	Miss Wagner	2 episodes
1990	Major Dad	Cassandra Loomis	Episode: "Standing Tall"
1991	Knots Landing	Doris	Episode: "Where There's a Will, There's a Way"
1991	Dinosaurs	Glenda Molehill (voice)	Episode: "Switched at Birth"
1991–1993	Homefront	Ruth Sloan	42 episodes
1993	Second Chances	Real Estate Agent	
1993	Joe's Life	Barbara Gennaro	11 episodes
1994	The George Carlin Show	Judith Pellegrino	2 episodes
1995	Bless This House	Mrs. Elkins	Episode: "Pilot"
1995	ABC Afterschool Specials	Elaine Marshall	Episode: "Fast Forward"
1995	Baywatch Nights	Paparazzi Agent	Episode: "Pursuit"
1995	Partners	Shana	Episode: "City Hall"
1996	Dream On	Hilaury	Episode: "Second Time Aground"
1996	Homicide: Life on the Street	Dr. Kate Wystan	Episode: "I've Got a Secret"
1996	Once You Meet a Stranger	Connie	TV movie
1996–1997	Savannah	Eleanor Alexander	22 episodes
1997	Cybill	Gretchen	Episode: "The Wedding"
1997	Pacific Palisades	Amy Nichols	3 episodes
1997–2002	Dharma & Greg	Abby O'Neil	119 episodes
2003	Wild Card	Mimi	Episode: "Mimi's Assets"
2004	Come to Papa	Barb	Episode: "The Crush"
2005	Strong Medicine	Chancellor Eleanor Brubeck	Episode: "Differentials"
2005	Cold Case	Elena Bistrong - 1978, 2005	Episode: "Bad Night"
2005	Grey's Anatomy	Verna Bradley	Episode: "Bring the Pain"
2006	House	Greta Sims	Episode: "Failure to Communicate"
2006	The Young and the Restless	Feather	3 episodes
2007	Medium	Helen Fitzpatrick	Episode: "Whatever Possessed You"
2007	ER	Sergeant O'Malley	Episode: "Officer Down"
2007	Cane	Mary	Episode: "One Man Is an Island"
2008	Ghost Whisperer	Tracy Edmondson	Episode: "Home But Not Alone"
2009	Rita Rocks	Aunt Mavis	Episode: "I Can't Make You Love Me"
2009	Private Practice	Eleanor Bergin	Episode: "The Parent Trap"
2010	No Ordinary Family	Susan Volson	Episode: "No Ordinary Mobster"
2011	Retired at 35	Carol Fabricant	Episode: "Stuck in the Meddle"
2011	Criminal Minds	Miss Rogers	Episode: "Coda"
2011	Love Bites	Gail Rouscher	Episode: "Sky High"
2012	Scandal	Sharon Marquette	Episode: "Dirty Little Secrets"
2012	Best Friends Forever	Marilyn	Episode: "Put a Pin in It"
2012	In Plain Sight	Joanna Stuber	3 episodes
2012	Drop Dead Diva	Judge Isabella Alexander	Episode: "Pick's & Pakes"
2012	Up All Night	Sally	Episode: "The Wedding"
2013	Anger Management	Elaine	Episode: "Charlie's Dad Starts to Lose It"
2013–2014	Veep	Mary King	2 episodes
2013	Mistresses	Dr. Susannah Ayers	Episode: "I Choose You"
2013–21	Mom	Marjorie Armstrong-Perugian	Recurring (season 1); main cast (seasons 2–8); 148 episodes
2014	Switched at Birth	Andrea Askowitz	Episode: "You Will Not Escape"
2015	The Brink	Susan Buckley	4 episodes
2022	The Goldbergs	Charlotte	Episode: "Grand Theft Scooter"
2022	Grace and Frankie	Jody	Episode: "The Horrible Family"
2022	In the Dark	Gran	3 episodes
2025	Monster: The Ed Gein Story	Mildred Newman	2 episodes

== Awards and nominations ==
Year	Association	Category	Nominated work	Result
1993	American Television Awards	Best Supporting Actress in a Dramatic Series	Homefront	Nominated
1993	Viewers for Quality Television Awards	Best Supporting Actress in a Quality Drama Series	Homefront	Nominated
2007	Method Fest	Best Ensemble Cast	Man in the Chair	Won
2011	Phoenix Film Critics Society Awards	Best Ensemble Cast	Midnight in Paris	Nominated
2014	Critics' Choice Television Award	Best Guest Performer in a Comedy Series	Mom	Nominated
