= List of Early Edition episodes =

The episode list for the American drama television series Early Edition. The show premiered in the United States on CBS on September 28, 1996. A total of 90 episodes were produced over the course of the show's four seasons, with the last original episode airing in the United States on May 27, 2000.

== Series overview ==
Season	Episodes	Originally released	
Season	Episodes	First released	Last released
1	23	September 28, 1996	May 17, 1997
2	22	September 27, 1997	May 23, 1998
3	23	September 26, 1998	May 15, 1999
4	22	September 25, 1999	May 27, 2000

== Episodes ==
=== Season 1 (1996–97) ===
The first season contains a total of 23 episodes which were originally broadcast in the United States from September 28, 1996, to May 17, 1997.

No. overall	No. in season	Title	Directed by	Written by	Original release date	Prod. code	Viewers (millions)
1	1	"Pilot"	Michael Dinner	Story by : Patrick Q. Page & Vik Rubenfeld & Ian Abrams; Teleplay by : Bob Brush & Ian Abrams	September 28, 1996	100	16.0
After being kicked out of his house by his wife, Marcia, stockbroker Gary Hobson is forced to move into a hotel room. There, he starts to receive a mysterious newspaper that is delivered to his door with a yellow cat. At first Gary does not think anything of it, but after a while, he realizes that it is tomorrow's edition of the Chicago Sun-Times. This gives Gary the opportunity to use the Paper for his own gain or to use it to help people. The first case of helping someone was winning $15,000 by betting on horse races, knowing the outcome, then giving it to his blind friend Marissa so she can buy a guide dog. Then Gary knew that a bank robbery would occur, but when he tried to warn the police, they scoffed. Then Marissa went to the bank to try to foil the robbery, and Gary noticed that the paper's headlined of the robbery death toll had changed from 9 to 10. Fearing that Marissa was the new casualty, Gary rushes to the bank. Ultimately he stops the robbery by talking to the robber and after accepting his destiny, plans to send him a winning lottery ticket to help his financial troubles. Guest Stars: Felicity Huffman, Ron Dean, Neil Flynn, and Marc Vann.
2	2	"The Choice"	Michael Dinner	Bob Brush & John Romano	October 5, 1996	101	17.6
As rampant traffic jams prevent him from getting to the airport to stop a plane destined to crash, Gary tries to save a 6-year-old girl (Mae Whitman) hit by a car by getting her the necessary attention at the hospital. However, he soon learns that he can't get to the airport without failing to save the girl. He ends up deciding to save the girl. After she is saved, Gary is shocked to learn that the girl's father was supposed to be the pilot of the doomed plane. However, since Gary was able to save her, the father was contacted just before takeoff, causing the flight to be canceled so he could rush to the hospital. As a result, the plane didn't crash. Guest Stars: Ron Dean, Eddie Jemison, and Rya Kihlstedt.
3	3	"Baby"	Randall Zisk	Bob Brush & Alex Taub	October 12, 1996	102	17.21
After the newspaper shows Chuck delivering twins on the L, Gary and Marissa try to convince him to go through with it. Meanwhile, Gary searches for a mysterious blonde woman. Guest Stars: Cynthia Nixon, Jane Krakowski, and Rya Kihlstedt.
4	4	"The Paper"	Michael Nankin	Bob Brush & John Romano	October 19, 1996	104	15.7
While searching for answers about the Paper, Gary investigates at the Chicago Sun-Times office building and becomes involved with one of the paper's reporters, Meredith Carson, who is suspicious of his apparent knowledge of a certain story. Gary has to prevent her from discovering the fact that he receives tomorrow's edition of the paper. Guest Star: Leslie Hope
5	5	"Thief Swipes Mayor's Dog"	Susan Seidelman	Bob Brush & Robert Rabinowitz & John Romano	October 26, 1996	103	12.4
Gary tries to prevent and understand why someone would want to kidnap Mayor Mike Garfield's dog. While doing this, Gary uncovers a lottery scheme. Guest Stars: Fyvush Finkel and Max Wright
6	6	"Hoops"	Rick Rosenthal	Bob Brush	November 2, 1996	105	16.0
Gary tries to stop a popular basketball player with a life-threatening heart condition from risking his life on the court and dying. While this is happening, Marissa runs into an old flame. Chuck tries to keep his brand-new sports car out of peril. Guest Stars: Michael Warren and James Tolkan.
7	7	"After Midnight"	Michael Toshiyuki Uno	Deborah Joy LeVine	November 9, 1996	106	14.5
A woman plans to abandon her baby and take her own life, so Gary attempts to reunite her with her parents, which fails and he starts running out of time to help her. Meanwhile, Chuck uses the Paper to get a date with an attractive woman, Lenore, with whom he shared a taxi. Guest Stars: Peri Gilpin and Ron Dean.
8	8	"Gun"	Jace Alexander	Robert Rabinowitz & Alex Taub	November 16, 1996	107	17.7
The Paper reveals that a young boy, Tommy Porter, will accidentally shoot his older brother, Bryce Porter, with a handgun. However, Gary's actions to prevent this led to the Paper changing to the children's mother, Nikki Porter, being murdered by her abusive ex, Kurt Porter. Gary stops the attack and Kurt is arrested, but Tommy out of fear hides in his treehouse with a gun and nearly shoots Bryce. Gary, reading this in the Paper, pulls him out of the way just in time and convinces Tommy to give him the gun. Seeing one of his sons nearly die shocks Kurt and he seems to come to his senses. Guest Stars: Ashley Crow and Mason Gamble.
9	9	"His Girl Thursday"	Stephen Cragg	Jeff Melvoin	November 23, 1996	108	16.4
Meredith re-enters Gary's life and she and Chuck use Gary's paper for personal gain, with disastrous results. Guest Stars: Leslie Hope and Marc Vann.
10	10	"The Wrong Man"	David Jones	Alex Taub	December 7, 1996	109	15.1
Gary learns that his ex-wife, Marcia, will marry his old boss, Phil Pritchard. Later, the newspaper reveals that Pritchard is going to be murdered. Guest Stars: Rya Kihlstedt and Marc Vann.
11	11	"Christmas"	Daniel Attias	Bob Brush	December 21, 1996	110	13.4
Gary seeks Detective Crumb's help in stopping a bomb that will kill 20 ice skaters. Meanwhile, Chuck is arrested and plots with a man who believes he is Santa. Guest Stars: M. Emmet Walsh, Stanley DeSantis, and Ron Dean.
12	12	"Frostbit"	Lee Bonner	Alex Taub & Deborah Joy LeVine & Bob Brush	January 11, 1997	111	14.24
During a save, Gary becomes stranded in an abandoned building with a homeless boy in 20 below zero weather and it is up to Chuck to save him. Guest Stars: Jonathan Tucker and Caroline Aaron
13	13	"Mob Wife"	Rick Rosenthal	Dusty Kay & Norman Morrill & Alex Taub	January 25, 1997	112	13.48
Gary and Chuck get mistakenly involved with the mob after they save a gangster's ex-fiancée, Theresa Laparko, from being shot and then Chuck falls in love with her. Guest Stars: Pauley Perrette and Neil Flynn.
14	14	"The Wall: Part 1"	Michael Dinner	Bob Brush	February 1, 1997	113	12.60
The Paper reveals that Gary will murder the U.S. president on his upcoming visit to Chicago. Guest Stars: Ron Dean and Josef Sommer.
15	15	"The Wall: Part 2"	James Quinn	Bob Brush	February 8, 1997	114	12.11
While evading the Secret Service, Gary attempts to prevent the presidential assassination. Guest Stars: Ron Dean and Lou Rawls.
16	16	"Bat Masterson"	Rick Wallace	Dusty Kay	February 22, 1997	115	12.77
Gary meets an ex-cop who believes that he is Bat Masterson. The ex-cop sets out to find the person who killed his former partner. Gary helps him solve the case and he starts to put his life back together. Guest Stars: Philip Bosco and Ron Dean.
17	17	"The Jury"	Stephen Cragg	Matt Dearborn	March 8, 1997	116	10.75
Gary is chosen to serve as a juror in the trial of a man accused of stealing money from his company and is unsuccessful in trying to avoid serving and is even elected foreperson. Gary is suspicious as the man, Phil, acts strangely and is not sure of his guilt. While Gary originally votes guilty, as he is about to read the verdict, the Cat delivers the Paper to him in the courtroom and he learns that Phil's wife holds the key to proving him innocent, causing him to change his vote to not guilty. As the judge sequesters the jury as a result, Gary sends Chuck to talk to Phil's wife who agrees to talk to Gary, but nobody else. With the help of Chuck, Gary escapes and meets up with the wife, but their plan is found out when one of the other jurors, Linda, sneaks in to see Gary and finds Chuck. Phil's wife reveals that Phil had learned of the embezzling scheme while at work and began investigating it. His boss, the head of the company, Prosky was stealing profits from himself and framed Phil for it and has been making threats against his family. She is unwilling to testify and reveals that the only other person who would have, Gus, is too scared after being beaten up at the beginning of the trial before Gary saved him. When Gary returns with this information, he learns that his deception was discovered and is kicked off the jury. After learning that Phil will kill himself, Gary and Chuck track down Gus and convince him to testify. They arrive as the jury is about to declare a guilty verdict and while the judge initially refuses to even hear from Gus, after seeing how scared he is of Prosky, he listens to Gary. While the judge refuses to allow Gus to testify, he declares a mistrial instead and asks the courts to arrange for Gary to never be called for jury duty again. At the end, Prosky is tried for his crimes and found guilty and Gary's fellow juror Linda drags him off for a drink. Guest stars: Mike Starr.
18	18	"Psychic"	Mel Damski	Alexander J. Taub & Gina Wendkos	April 12, 1997	117	13.54
Gary partners with a psychic, Claire, whom he at first believes to be phony, to save a young child who has been kidnapped. Guest Star: Kathy Najimy.
19	19	"The Cat"	Daniel Attias	Norman Morrill	April 13, 1997	119	16.42
The cat and the Paper start being delivered to a dying woman. Guest Stars: Talia Balsam, Marion Ross, and Roger Ebert
20	20	"Phantom at the Opera"	Jan Eliasberg	John J. Sakmar & Kerry Lenhart	April 19, 1997	118	12.07
Gary falls for an artist he saved. However, Gary faces a tough decision when he learns that she will reunite with an old flame. Guest Star: Adrienne Shelly.
21	21	"Faith"	John Kretchmer	Bob Brush	April 26, 1997	120	13.38
Gary is hospitalized after being run over by a car and suffering a head injury. At the hospital, Gary meets a young girl named Rachel who is in need of a heart. Gary faces a moral dilemma when he learns that he could save Rachel's life by missing a save. Gary chooses to save the kid, Tommy, and is shot, causing the kid who shot him, Eddie, to drive away at high speed. Gary has an out-of-body experience where he communicates with Rachel's spirit who convinces him to drop the paper and rely on faith as she apparently dies. It is shown that Gary nearly dies himself, but is revived and the doctors reveal that Rachel did get a heart: the kid who shot Gary, Eddie, flipped his car and died and she got his. Gary and Rachel recover and Chuck makes peace with Tommy who had helped Eddie steal his car which he never recovered. Guest Star: Robert Picardo.
22	22	"Dad"	Randall Zisk	Alex Taub & Bob Brush	May 3, 1997	121	13.38
Gary's father, Bernie, temporarily moves in with his son after Gary's mom kicks him out. After learning about the Paper and enjoying helping others, Bernie decides to stay permanently. Guest Star: William Devane.
23	23	"Love Is Blind"	Michael Lange	John J. Sakmar & Kerry Lenhart	May 17, 1997	122	13.40
Gary attempts to stop the murder of a college professor, Dr. Price, who thinks that Gary is stalking her. Gary suspects Marissa's college study partner, Jeffrey Craig, is the culprit. Guest star: Tara Lipinski.

=== Season 2 (1997–98) ===
The second season contains a total of 22 episodes which were originally broadcast in the United States from September 27, 1997, to May 23, 1998.

No. overall	No. in season	Title	Directed by	Written by	Original release date	Prod. code	Viewers (millions)
24	1	"Home"	Mel Damski	H. Wiggens	September 27, 1997	201	15.52
Gary finds out that a greedy businessman wants to purchase McGinty's and an orphanage in order to demolish them and build a parking lot. Meanwhile, Gary must also find a new place to live after his hotel room burns because of an electrical fire and forces him to move out. Guest stars: Alex Rocco, Liz Vassey, Paul Dooley.
25	2	"The Medal"	Daniel Attias	Sean Clark	October 4, 1997	203	13.46
Gary must help a Vietnam vet who has the Congressional Medal of Honor when a ceremony in his honor triggers guilt and flashbacks because of a mistake he made in the Vietnam War. Meanwhile, Chuck falls in love. Guest stars: Louis Gossett Jr.
26	3	"The Wedding"	James Quinn	Carla Kettner	October 11, 1997	204	13.29
McGinty's is asked to cater the wedding of Gary's ex-girlfriend and high school sweetheart, who still has some romantic feelings for Gary. Meanwhile, her father has been under police's witness protection for three weeks and the paper warns of trouble at the wedding. Guest stars: Brian McNamara, Peter Burns, Neil Flynn.
27	4	"Jenny Sloane"	Gary Nelson	Alex Taub	October 18, 1997	202	13.76
Gary must help a young boy who is ill with leukemia, but who is refusing to undergo treatment. Gary tries to get him to meet Jenny Sloane, Chicago's sweetheart who is ill with cancer. Guest stars: Robyn Lively, John Spencer.
28	5	"Downsized"	Mel Damski	Nick Harding	October 25, 1997	205	12.47
An old co-worker and friend of Gary and Chuck's, Fred Meanwell, is having a mid-life crisis and Gary and Chuck must stop him having a fatal plastic surgery to impress his girlfriend and enhance his career. Guest stars: Richard Gilliland and Barbara Howard.
29	6	"Angels and Devils"	Gary Nelson	Sean Cholodenko	November 1, 1997	206	13.34
Gary and Chuck become involved with a night basketball program at a local church for inner city youth, where they meet a young nun named Sister Mary. Gary helps stop Sister Mary from abandoning her call after a young man involved with the basketball program is killed during a convenience store robbery attempt, which Gary had failed to stop. Guest stars: Judy Greer, Nia Peeples, and Vicellous Reon Shannon.
30	7	"Redfellas"	John Kretchmer	Carla Kettner	November 8, 1997	207	14.30
The newspaper arrives with an article written in Russian. Gary saves a cab driver who is able to read the Russian article to Gary. Gary then must save a beautiful Russian violinist, Paulina Rosanova, from being murdered and bring her together with her long lost father. Guest stars: Stephanie Romanov, Mike Nussbaum.
31	8	"March in Time"	Robert Ginty	Randy Feldman	November 15, 1997	208	13.55
After learning that a leader of a white supremacist's movement, Darryl Foster, will be assassinated during a march, Gary begins to debate whether he should save his life or let him die. Marissa manages to convince him to save him. The situation is further complicated when the leader's son, Lance Foster, befriends a young African-American kid. Guest stars: Emile Hirsch and Nick Searcy.
32	9	"A Regular Joe"	Mel Damski	Jeff Melvoin	November 22, 1997	209	13.34
Gary is stressed out, and just wants a regular life. He is having recurring dreams about a psychiatrist encouraging him to take Sundays off from the paper, advice that Gary takes. Unfortunately, he finds out that he needs to convince a famous quarterback for the Chicago Bears, Joe Damski, to stop playing in order to avoid a serious injury. Meanwhile, Chuck and Marissa clash over the management of McGinty's bar. Guest stars: Dick Butkus, Charles Durning, Emily Procter, Scott Adsit.
33	10	"A Bris is Just a Bris"	Scott Paulin	Alex Taub	December 20, 1997	210	11.61
Gary comes between his cook and an accident-prone librarian, the latter of which falls in love with him for saving her. Chuck turns truthful while dating a Rabbi. Guest stars: Jessica Hecht, Stephanie March.
34	11	"A Minor Miracle"	Jim Charleston	Randy Feldman	January 10, 1998	212	10.09
Gary's search for a missing child makes him a suspect in her disappearance. When the police refuse to listen to him, Gary goes into a flooding underground sewer to try to rescue the little girl before it is too late. Guest stars: Bill Nunn, Tim Kazurinsky, John Beasley, Taylor Momsen.
35	12	"Romancing the Throne"	Gary Nelson	Carla Kettner	January 17, 1998	211	12.90
After she hides in the backseat of his van, Gary must deal with Princess Sibella, who is believed to be missing after she runs away from her privileged and rigid lifestyle. This is an homage to the 1953 film, Roman Holiday, starring Audrey Hepburn. Guest stars: Hayley DuMond, Paxton Whitehead, Scott Adsit.
36	13	"Walk, Don't Run"	Richard Heus	Sean Clark	January 24, 1998	213	12.62
Gary is nominated to fill in a vacant City Council seat and he tries to get a street light installed at a dangerous crossroad where a lot of street accidents occur, but he is told that first he has to vote with them on a project that Gary learns will displace a lot of people. So Gary decides not to vote with them and they decide not to back Gary's project. Gary has to get help from Molly Greene and a former and honest Council member. Guest stars: Don Stark, H. Richard Greene, George Murdock, Mimi Lieber.
37	14	"The Return of Crumb"	Gary Nelson	Randy Feldman	January 31, 1998	214	10.46
Gary has to keep a soon-to-retire Detective Crumb from being arrested due to a blackmail investigation after he becomes the target of a ruthless District Attorney out to prove police corruption. Guest stars: Ron Dean, Michael Shannon.
38	15	"Mum's the Word"	John Patterson	Robert Masello	April 4, 1998	216	10.81
Marissa is cursed by earrings her new boyfriend stole from a mummy exhibit. Guest stars: Karina Lombard, Brian George, Shaun Toub, Héctor Elizondo, Jayne Brook and Rocky Carroll.
39	16	"Where or When"	David Grossman	Shannon Dobson	April 11, 1998	215	10.60
In a "Rear Window" style plot, Gary is injured in a fall and becomes housebound while his broken leg heals. He watches people in the apartment building across the street and is attracted to a new neighbor who seems to have been the victim of a murder almost 50 years ago. Guest stars: Ron Dean, Andrew Rothenberg, Caitlin Hart, Alexondra Lee and George D. Wallace.
40	17	"The Fourth Carpathian"	Gary Nelson	Alex Taub	April 18, 1998	217	11.21
Gary's parents receive the paper when Gary is trapped in an abandoned theatre after trying to save a monkey. Guest stars: Ron Dean, William Devane, and Tess Harper.
41	18	"The Quality of Mercy"	Fisher Stevens	David T. Levinson	April 25, 1998	218	11.41
The paper tells Gary that a man, John Hernandez, is going to die in a road accident, so he saves the man, but afterwards, the paper changes and says that the man is going to kill Rachel Stone. Gary foils the attempt and tries to warn Rachel, an Assistant State's Attorney, because the man is a recently released convict and she was the one who prosecuted him. After Gary refuses to tell her how he knows about this, she dismisses him. John puts Chuck into a coma when he steals his car for the getaway. Gary interferes with John's next attempt at Rachel's home and that turns into a hostage situation. He manages to stop Rachel and John from killing each other and convinces John to let him drive the two of them away from the scene and letting Rachel go. They end up at the railways where two kids are shouting for help. One of them is trapped at the rail points with a train approaching and John hops onto a different train but returns in the nick of time to help save the kids at the expense of his own life. Chuck wakes up. Guest stars: Luis Guzman, John Beasley and Ron Dean.
42	19	"Show Me the Monet"	Mel Damski	Nick Harding	May 2, 1998	219	9.15
Gary learns that a British person who assisted him with a mission is actually a forger with many enemies. He is willing to return a stolen masterpiece in exchange for help breaking into a museum. Guest stars: Ian Ogilvy, Sherry Miller.
43	20	"Don't Walk Away, Renee"	Gary Nelson	Sean Clark & Alex Taub	May 9, 1998	222	9.74
Criminals force Gary to turn over a revolutionary computer program made by one of his childhood friends, Renee, by kidnapping Gary's parents. Guest stars: William Devane, Tess Harper and Lori Heuring.
44	21	"Hot Time in the Old Town"	Gary Nelson	Carla Kettner	May 16, 1998	220	10.36
Gary reads in the paper that a pylon at a construction site drops and knocks over a nearby building, killing thousands. Gary tries to prevent the disaster from happening only to get knocked out when he gets hit in the head and wakes up two days before the 1871 Great Chicago Fire. He meets Morris, who looks like Chuck, and he also meets Jesse, a young boy who is the brother of a woman, Eleanor, who is a singer at a saloon, and looks exactly like Marissa, and who is a victim of racism. Gary must help Jesse and Eleanor and try to stop the Chicago fire, too. Guest stars: Scott Bryce.
45	22	"Second Sight"	Daniel Attias	H. Wiggens	May 23, 1998	221	9.59
Marissa sees a vision and believes that her sight is returning. Chuck witnesses a mob murder and Gary, Chuck, and Crumb are taken hostage, leaving Marissa to save them. The mysterious blonde lady returns. Guest stars: Ron Dean.

=== Season 3 (1998–99) ===
The third season contains a total of 23 episodes which were originally broadcast in the United States from September 26, 1998, to May 15, 1999.

No. overall	No. in season	Title	Directed by	Written by	Original release date	Viewers (millions)
46	1	"Blackout"	Gary Nelson	Star Frohman	September 26, 1998	10.61
During a blackout which covers all of Chicago, Marissa attempts to save two trapped teenagers, while Patrick, a new bartender at McGinty's, helps Gary out. Special Guest Star: George Takei
47	2	"Collision"	Randy Zisk	Alex Taub	October 3, 1998	10.97
Chuck has left McGinty's in financial chaos and Marissa advertises for a pub manager in the paper without telling Gary. Gary has his hands full because he must find a way to prevent a collision that kills anywhere from 9 to 16 people, but has no definitive cause. He then has to decide whether or not to try to stop the crash or to save an 8-year-old, Henry Paget.
48	3	"A Horse Is a Horse"	Lee Bonner	Carla Kettner	October 10, 1998	9.74
After Henry witnesses Gary rescue a clown from a falling bucket, he discovers one of Gary's newspapers and misuses the information contained in the paper to make friends in school and to provide his dad with the winning horses at a race track. Henry's father thinks he has a "gift" and wants to continue using him as a way to make a quick buck. Real-life filming location: Hawthorne Racetrack
49	4	"Lt. Hobson, U.S.N."	Mel Damski	Sean Clark	October 17, 1998	8.63
To stop an explosion, Gary poses as a Navy Lieutenant, but before he can get off the base, he attracts the attention of an admiral who wants Gary to take his daughter to a dance. However, things do not go as planned and Gary ends up imprisoned in a Naval Jail. While in jail, Gary receives the paper and learns that McGinty's is going to blow up. Meanwhile, Henry gets the chance to impact global politics. Guest Stars: Leslie Bibb, Ronny Cox
50	5	"Saint Nick"	Jim Quinn	Jeff Melvoin	October 24, 1998	11.14
Gary becomes jealous when Erica reunites with a childhood friend, Nick Sterling, who is a philanthropist and beloved by everyone. He reads in the paper that Nick will propose to Erica and that the hospital Nick recently completed construction on is going to catch fire at the opening party. Guest Star: Jason Brooks
51	6	"Halloween"	Gary Nelson	Bob Brush	October 31, 1998	10.58
Gary is abducted by two witches that he saved from a fire. They believe that Gary is a warlock and that Gary can help them free their sister who has been locked up for close to 200 years. Gary needs to escape to prevent poisoned candy being handed out to some kids. Guest Stars: Jennifer Blanc, Noelle Parker
52	7	"Up Chuck"	David Grossman	Alex Taub	November 7, 1998	12.00
Gary is suspicious when Chuck makes a surprise visit from California with a surprisingly new attitude, claiming that he is very successful in Hollywood. Gary soon learns that Chuck is paying someone to follow him and film his heroic acts in hopes of getting a movie deal. Guest Star: Jerry Springer
53	8	"Deadline"	Scott Paulin	Sean Clark	November 14, 1998	10.80
The paper tells Gary that a man, named Ricky Brown, is going to be executed the next day. Gary learns that the previous recipient of the paper, Lucius Snow, tried to help Brown, but could not. He did leave some clues for Gary about the case. With help from reporter Molly Greene, Gary tries to prove Brown's innocence and clear his name hours before his execution. They start by talking to the victim's sister, whom Brown had been seeing. Guest Stars: John Allen Nelson, Lisa Darr
54	9	"In Gary We Trust"	Ian Barry	Carla Kettner	November 21, 1998	11.49
When Gary interrupts a federal investigation by trying to save a towel boy from being shot in a sauna, he is placed in the Witness Protection Program. It turns out that the people who were going to kill him are mobsters and the spa worker is actually an FBI agent working on a case to bring the mobsters down. He is assigned an attractive-but-surly agent, Toni Brigatti, to watch over him around the clock, which puts off Erica, whom he just got the courage to ask out and makes it difficult for Gary to fulfill his duties with the Paper. Guest Star: Constance Marie
55	10	"Nest Egg"	Gary Nelson	Alex Taub & Sean Clark	December 5, 1998	9.68
Much to his surprise, Gary runs into his mother in the middle of Chicago. He shadows her and sees her drinking champagne with a strange man. Gary first suspects that she is having an affair, but soon learns that the stranger has tricked her into investing her retirement money in a fictitious company. The two of them try to recover not only her funds, but also those of the con artist's other victims. Guest Star: Tess Harper
56	11	"Teen Angels"	James Quinn	Laura Doyle	December 19, 1998	9.97
Gary is mistaken as a high school substitute teacher in order to prevent a school shooting. However, when his newspaper is torn up and lost, he is unable to pinpoint who the shooter is.
57	12	"Slippity-Doo-Dah"	Fisher Stevens	Carla Kettner	January 9, 1999	12.71
Gary catches a snake that was going to bite a bingo player who faints and knocks her head. Turns out she is supposed to be Henry’s babysitter. Gary takes over for her, but Marissa warns him that he cannot handle both the Paper and Henry. While babysitting for Henry, Gary encounters a woman who has tendency for ambulance chasing.
58	13	"The Last Untouchable"	Randy Roberts	Sean Clark	January 16, 1999	9.90
Gary gets in the middle of a feud between a former Untouchable, Capone’s last living major gang member, who was just released from prison, and a retired T-Man who helped put him away. Guest Stars: Ernest Borgnine. Joseph Campanella
59	14	"Just One of Those Things"	Gary Nelson	Alex Taub	February 6, 1999	9.82
Gary begins to experience medical problems stemming from his frequent lying to Erica about his whereabouts. He decides to come clean and tell her about the newspaper and his heroic acts. However, she has a tough time believing him after his paper gets switched when Patrick, who is looking for an apartment, accidentally takes Gary’s paper. Guest Star: Tom Bosley
60	15	"Funny Valentine"	Adam Nimoy	Jeff Melvoin	February 13, 1999	10.85
While in town to discuss a major deal with the Chicago Cubs, star ball player Andy Miller escapes serious harm when Gary saves him from being severely injured in a freak accident. Andy does bruise his shoulder during the incident and Gary takes him to the hospital where Andy winds up falling in love with his physician, Dr. Suzy Pietro. Andy decides to accept the Cubs lucrative offer so he can stay in Chicago and be with Suzy. Unfortunately, Andy's agent does not want him to sign with the team and he soon learns that Suzy is contemplating a marriage proposal from another man. Meanwhile, Marissa becomes acquainted with a man named Emmett Brown. Guest Star: Paul Ben-Victor, Ray Toler
61	16	"Number One with a Bullet"	David Petrarca	Attica Locke	February 20, 1999	11.58
Marissa's old friend, Julius, aka C-Roc, is in town for a CD signing and Gary has to prevent him from being killed at a concert. Guest Stars: Coolio as Julius "C-Roc" Ruby, Tone Loc
62	17	"Two To Tangle"	Jim Quinn	Rick Mittleman	February 27, 1999	10.57
A couple is fighting with each other over their lingerie company and Henry befriends their daughter. Guest Stars: Tracy Kolis, Larry Poindexter, Mimi Paley
63	18	"Fate"	Gary Nelson	Carla Kettner	March 20, 1999	9.45
A homeless man plummets to his death while Gary tries to save him. Gary is rattled by his inability to prevent the tragedy and questions his involvement with the paper. When Gary refuses to prevent the next day's bad news, he winds up being forced to confront his own fate when he reads his obituary in the paper. Guest Star: Michael Whaley
64	19	"Crumb Again"	Mel Damski	Sean Clark	April 3, 1999	10.61
Crumb is about to publish a manuscript about police corruption in Chicago, when he becomes the target of someone who does not want the book to come out. Gary and Crumb then narrowly escape a drive-by shooting. Federal Agent Brigatti, who recently transferred to the Chicago detective squad, takes on the case and attempts to track down Crumb's potential killer. Guest Star: Ron Dean, Constance Marie
65	20	"Pinch Hitters"	Todd Pfeiffer	Dan Freudenberger	April 17, 1999	9.63
Gary tries to prevent an accident involving a rare monkey, but he gets bitten by the animal and is forced into quarantine until it can be determined whether or not he has contracted a rare disease. In the meantime, Gary enlists Marissa's help in preventing an elderly man from being injured in a variety of dangerous mishaps. With the help of her new boyfriend, Emmet, she attempts to save the man. Guest Star: Red Buttons
66	21	"Home Groan"	Scott Paulin	Alex Taub	May 1, 1999	7.68
While Gary is able to prevent a robbery attempt by dangerous criminals, he is unable to convince the local sheriff that the convicts are hiding out in his little town. It turns out that the sheriff, Joe, is an envious old high-school classmate of Gary's who decides to throw him in jail for causing a ruckus. While behind bars, Gary reads in the paper that his mother will be killed by the convicts. When he is unable to convince Joe to stop by his parents house to prevent the impending tragedy, Gary's dad, Bernie, comes to his rescue and they both rush to save Gary's mother. Guest Stars: William Devane, Tess Harper, Robert Duncan McNeill
67	22	"Play It Again, Sammo"	Gary Nelson	Sean Clark	May 8, 1999	9.24
Together with Sammo Law (appearing in a crossover role from Martial Law), Gary works to recover a priceless Chinese helmet and also protect a thief and his niece from being murdered. Real Life Filming Location: Navy Pier Guest Stars: Sammo Hung as Sammo Law, Martina McBride, Lauren Tom
68	23	"Blowing Up Is Hard to Do"	David Grossman	Jeff Pinkner & Carla Kettner	May 15, 1999	8.82
Gary saves Detective Armstrong's wife from drowning at a gym. The Armstrongs invite Gary and Erica to dinner at their house, but Detective Armstrong is suspicious about Gary saving his wife, and accuses him of trying to kill her. Later, Erica decides to end her relationship with Gary and Gary must prevent two buildings from being blown up. Guest Star: Tamara Taylor, Michael Whaley

=== Season 4 (1999–2000) ===
The fourth and final season contains a total of 22 episodes which were originally broadcast in the United States from September 25, 1999, to May 27, 2000.

No. overall	No. in season	Title	Directed by	Written by	Original release date	Viewers (millions)
69	1	"The Out-of-Towner"	Gary Nelson	Alex Taub	September 25, 1999	9.38
Gary meets a man from New York, Sam Cooper, who receives tomorrow's edition of the New York Daily News. However, unlike Gary, Sam hires other people to complete the rescues and uses the paper's knowledge to make money. Guest Star: Willie Garson
70	2	"Duck Day Afternoon"	Randy Roberts	Carla Kettner	October 2, 1999	9.55
In an effort to avoid spending time with his parents, who have decided to move in with him because their town was ravaged by a storm, Gary races off to save a group of ducks and draws the attention of inquisitive Chicago Sun-Times photojournalist, Miguel Diaz. When Gary pleads with Miguel not to run the photo he took of him – so his parents will not find out that he is intentionally avoiding them – the photographer becomes more curious. He realizes that Gary's name keeps popping up in connection with many rescues. Guest Stars: William Devane, Tess Harper
71	3	"Take Me Out to the Ball Game"	Reza Badiyi	Sean Clark	October 9, 1999	9.85
Chuck comes for a visit and offers to take Gary to a Cubs game where a promising rookie, Pedro Mendoza, is going to play. Gary finds himself trying to help the owner of a restaurant who borrowed money from a loan shark, who is now demanding ownership in the restaurant as payment. Meanwhile, Chuck inadvertently changes the course of the day's events by taking a cab from Mendoza. Guest Star: Amaury Nolasco
72	4	"The Iceman Taketh"	Scott Paulin	James Stanley & Diane Messina Stanley	October 16, 1999	10.76
Gary and Detective Toni Brigatti have to pretend they are a couple for an extended amount of time in effort to catch a jewel thief, while also searching for the gas leak that will cause a ship to explode on Lake Michigan. Guest Stars: Kimberley Davies, Constance Marie, Paul Satterfield
73	5	"Camera Shy"	Reza Badiyi	Eric Tuchman	October 23, 1999	8.50
Feeling bad that he helped get Miguel Diaz fired from two jobs, Gary tries to find him another job. When Miguel photographs a criminal thought to be dead, he believes that he has a chance at getting his job back at the Chicago Sun-Times. However, things do not go as planned and Gary must save Miguel from being killed. Guest Star: Gregory Itzin
74	6	"Wild Card"	Kevin Dowling	Josh Appelbaum & André Nemec	October 30, 1999	9.84
Gary tries to relax with his obligation to the Paper, but Patrick keeps causing problems when he keeps following Gary around, trying to find a way to tell Gary that he is leaving. When Patrick's actions lead to an explosion at a Halloween rave party, Gary instructs him not to move a muscle – a directive that backfires when Patrick attempts to help and winds up in a life-threatening situation.
75	7	"Fatal Edition, Part 1"	Gary Nelson	Jeff Pinkner	November 6, 1999	8.94
Gary is arrested and charged with murder after he is found standing right next to the slain body of a man who had earlier threatened to investigate him after the Paper mis-publishes the time of a reporter's murder. Later, Gary becomes a fugitive. Guest Stars: Michael Whaley, Constance Marie
76	8	"Fatal Edition, Part 2"	Gary Nelson	Doris Egan	November 13, 1999	9.84
Gary is on the run from the police after the murder of Frank Scanlon. Gary learns that at the time of Scanlon's death, he was about to break a story on a murder-for-hire ring. With the help of Chicago Sun-Times photographer Miguel Diaz, Gary attempts to clear his name. Meanwhile, Detective Brigatti uncovers some evidence of her own, which proves Gary's innocence and implicates someone with whom she works closely in the department, which puts her life in danger. Guest Stars: Constance Marie, Michael Whaley
77	9	"Weather Girl"	Mel Damski	Alex Taub	November 20, 1999	8.83
Gary provides precise weather forecasts to an attractive TV weather personality, Rebecca, who becomes renowned for her accurate forecasts, until the paper shows up at his doorstep one morning without a trace of the next day's weather and the weathergirl quits and is unable to warn of a coming disaster. Meanwhile, Uncle Phil keeps getting fired from one job after another. Guest Star: Fyvush Finkel
78	10	"Run, Gary, Run"	Scott Paulin	Carla Kettner	December 18, 1999	9.32
When Gary ignores Marissa's repeated requests to help her manage the workload at McGinty's, the Paper plays a dangerous trick on him: he reads that his friend will be struck and killed by a car.
79	11	"Rose"	Julia Rask	Lorin Wertheimer	February 19, 2000	7.45
Crumb tries to caution Gary that a woman, Rose, who has amnesia, may appear sweet and innocent, but is probably trouble. Gary ignores his warning, even when evidence surfaces that she has a criminal record. When he believes her explanation that an old boyfriend is after her, Gary agrees to loan Rose $25,000 to get rid of him and is stunned when she suddenly runs off with his money. Guest Stars: Ron Dean, Brigid Brannagh
80	12	"Snow Angels"	Sander Stern	Josh Appelbaum & André Nemec	February 26, 2000	9.30
As a blizzard sweeps across Chicago, Gary encounters two men, Earl Camby, a reformed criminal who now devotes his life to helping those less fortunate than himself, and Cliff Mourning, a sleazy motel operator. As Gary tries to save Earl's life when a building collapses on him, he reads that Cliff is going to succumb to a heart attack. Torn between leaving Earl alone to die while he saves an ungrateful human being, Gary contemplates a decision that could ultimately tie the two men's lives together. Guest Stars: Stan Shaw, Jon Polito
81	13	"Gifted"	Kevin Dowling	Dianne Messina Stanley & James Stanley	March 4, 2000	11.31
After preventing Nikki from being injured in a school bus accident, Gary meets the tough-talking 13-year-old and learns that she is clairvoyant and also knew about the accident before it almost happened. Gary has to try to help her realize her abilities are a gift. Guest Star: Daniel Roebuck
82	14	"Performance Anxiety"	Gary Nelson	Doris Egan	March 11, 2000	7.72
Gary's Paper is stolen by Joey Clams, the former recipient of tomorrow's New York paper whose paper stops coming. Guest Star: T.J. Thyne
83	15	"False Witness"	Ian Barry	Eric Tuchman	March 25, 2000	9.69
Gary is placed in a difficult situation when Miguel's brother, Joey, steals a car. However, Gary's decision to deny knowing Joey ultimately leads to a life-threatening situation. Guest Star: Michael Whaley
84	16	"The Play's the Thing"	Deborah Reinisch	Michael Katz	April 8, 2000	7.53
Gary joins an amateur acting troupe where he finds former detective Crumb participating and later learns that the theatre will be burned down by an arsonist. Guest Stars: Ron Dean, Timothy Omundson
85	17	"Blind Faith"	Jim Quinn	Jeff Pinkner	April 22, 2000	7.69
Gary temporarily loses his sight while trying to prevent three teens from being blown up by an old cannonball. While at the hospital, Gary meets a young kid named Nate Calvin, whose mother is ill. The next day, without being able to see, Gary must save Nate Calvin, who is trapped in an abandoned building by bullies.
86	18	"Occasionally Amber"	Kyle Chandler	Lawrence Meyers	April 29, 2000	7.38
Chuck comes back to Chicago and announces he is engaged to a girl named Jade. When Gary meets her, he is shocked because Jade is really Amber, the jewel thief he encountered a few months back and allowed to escape. Gary confides in Marissa who tells him that he must inform Chuck. Gary's not sure what to do, especially when Detective Brigatti, whose career was nearly ruined by her, learns she is back and wants to take her down. Gary confronts Jade, who tells him that she truly loves Chuck and that she is really Jade. He decides not to tell Chuck what he knows. However, the next morning's paper says that a large diamond will be stolen from an auction. Guest Stars: Kimberley Davies, Constance Marie
87	19	"Mel Schwartz, Bounty Hunter"	Todd Pfeiffer	Alex Taub	May 6, 2000	6.64
Gary runs into a robber who strips him of everything. The next day, Gary recognizes him and starts to pursue him, but so does a man named Mel Schwartz, an accountant that is trying to become a bounty hunter, whom Gary has to rescue after he gets in over his head. Guest Stars: Jerome "New Jack" Young, Tom "Tommy Dreamer" Laughlin
88	20	"Everybody Goes to Rick's"	Gary Nelson	James Stanley & Dianne Messina Stanley & Lorin Wertheimer	May 20, 2000	7.51
Gary travels back in time to 1929 to the St. Valentine's Day Massacre in order to try to save someone. Eventually after returning to his own time and saving Crumb, Gary learns that the man he saved was Crumb's father. Guest Stars: Ron Dean, Laura Leighton
89	21	"Luck o' the Irish"	Gary Nelson	Sean Clark	May 27, 2000	7.21
When Gary meets an Irish man, bad luck begins to center around him, including making a young Irish woman lose her chance at the million dollar lottery when Gary swipes her dollar with which she was going to buy the winning ticket. Gary ends up pretending to be engaged to her while she dodges an INS agent and looks for the man she loves, Nigel, while her brother plans their wedding. Ultimately the woman, Kate O'Rourke, learns that she was just deluding herself about Nigel and he is actually married and she and Gary reveal the truth to her family before Gary has to chase after a dump truck to stop the agent from being killed by accident. There, he learns that the agent, a man named Frank, was actually tracking down Kate because he was a childhood friend of hers and is in love with her, and that Frank lost touch with her because of her brother's intervention. In the end, Frank and Kate get married and Gary sends them a winning lottery ticket to make up for the one he cost her, and Gary restores the Irish man's tab, ending his streak of bad luck. Guest Stars: Henry Gibson, Tess Harper, Leigh-Allyn Baker
90	22	"Time"	Mel Damski	Carla Kettner	May 13, 2000	7.98
Gary learns that Lucius Snow, the previous recipient of the Paper, saved his life when he was eleven years old and during the encounter Gary unwittingly became Snow's heir to the Paper. Note: This was supposed to be air as the series finale but due to a scheduling mixup was aired before the penultimate two episodes. Guest Stars: Charles Durning, Tess Harper, Michael Whaley, Janelle Ginestra
