= Lynn Marie Latham =

American television writer and producer

Lynn Marie Latham is an American television writer, producer, and showrunner. Her initial foray into writing for television was as a story editor for the series Berrenger's in 1985. That same year, Latham became a writer for the nighttime serial Knots Landing.

== Career ==
In 1991, she and husband Bernard Lechowick created the prime-time drama Homefront, based in the post-World War II era. Latham co-created the television dramas Wild Card, Hotel Malibu, and Second Chances. In addition to serving as Executive Producer on those series, Latham also executive-produced The District and That's Life. She was a creative consultant on both Savannah and Pacific Palisades, a writer and producer on Knots Landing, and head writer for the ABC Daytime soap opera Port Charles. Latham served as both Head Writer and Executive Producer of The Young and the Restless from 2006 to 2007. Her first episode as Y&R's head writer garnered 5,304,000 viewers while All My Children and Days of Our Lives received 3,235,000 and 3,972,000 viewers respectively.

Latham's father, John H. Latham, was a Western writer who published seven novels and over a thousand short stories. Her cousin, Aaron Latham, wrote the article that inspired the movie Urban Cowboy. She has two sons, Richard Latham Lechowick and Vincent Latham Lechowick.

== Positions held ==
Mama Malone

- Writer: March 1984 - July 1984

Berrenger's

- Story Editor: January 1985 - March 1985

Knots Landing (head writer from September 1986 - May 1991)

- Producer: 1988 - 1991
- Script Writer: 1985 - 1991
- Executive Story Editor: 1985 - 1988

Homefront

- Creator
- Writer: September 1991 - April 1993
- Executive Producer: September 1991 - April 1993

Hotel Malibu

- Creator
- Writer: August 1994 - September 1994
- Executive Producer: August 1994 - September 1994

Live Through This

- Executive Consultant: 2000

Pacific Palisades

- Writer: April 1997 - July 1997
- Creative Consultant: April 1997 - July 1997

Port Charles

- Head Writer: 1997 - 1999

Savannah

- Writer: 1996
- Creative Consultant: 1996

Second Chances

- Creator
- Writer: November 1993 - February 1994
- Executive Producer: November 1993 - February 1994

That's Life

- Writer: 2001
- Executive Producer: 2000 - 2001

The District

- Writer: 2000
- Executive Producer: 2000

Wild Card

- Creator
- Writer: August 2003 - July 2005
- Executive Producer: August 2003 - July 2005

The Young and the Restless

- Executive Producer: September, 2006 - December 24, 2007
- Head Writer: February 16, 2006 - December 24, 2007
- Creative Consultant: November 14, 2005 - February 15, 2006

== Knots Landing Credits ==
The following episodes were written by Latham

Lynn Marie Latham & Bernard Lechowick

- 124. A Man of Good Will

Lynn Marie Latham & Dianne Messina Stanley

- 269. Devil on My Shoulder
- 297. Upwardly Mobile

Lynn Marie Latham & James Stanley

- 240. Giganticus II: The Revenge
- 262. My First Born

Bernard Lechowick & Lynn Marie Latham

- 239. Birds Do It, Bees Do It

Lynn Marie Latham Solo Credits:

- 137. Awakenings
- 141. To Sing His Praise
- 149. A Key to a Woman's Heart
- 155. The Legacy 163. Reunion
- 170. Over the Edge
- 178. My True Love
- 184. Neighborly Conduct
- 189. Do Not Fold, Spindle, or Mutilate
- 191. Missing Persons
- 195. There are Smiles
- 201. Noises Everywhere (2)
- 206. If Not Now, When?
- 208. The Blushing Bride
- 211. A Fair Race
- 218. The Perfect Alibi
- 221. Borderline
- 223. The Pick-Up Game
- 225. A Weekend Getaway
- 229. Cabin Fever
- 231. Mrs. Peacock in the Library with the Lead Pipe
- 234. The Spin Doctor
- 236. Double Jeopardy
- 244. Straight Down the Line
- 250. Prince Charming
- 254. Mixed Messages
- 257. Never Judge a Book By Its Cover
- 266. The Grim Reaper
- 275. The Fan Club
- 278. Blind Side
- 282. You Can Call Me Nick
- 286. The Lady or the Tiger
- 292. Always on Your Side
- 294. Call Me Dimitri

== Head Writing Tenure ==
Preceded by Carolyn Culliton; Richard Culliton	Head Writer of Port Charles; October 14, 1997 – May 6, 1999	Succeeded by Scott Hamner
Preceded by Kay Alden; John F. Smith	Head Writer of The Young and the Restless (with Kay Alden: 2/16/06-12/22/06) (with John F. Smith: 2/16/06-11/10/06) (with Scott Hamner: 10/26/06-12/22/07); February 16, 2006 – December 22, 2007	Succeeded by Josh Griffith; Maria Arena Bell

== Executive Producing Tenure ==
Preceded by John F. Smith (no EP listed before she joined)	Executive Producer of The Young and the Restless; October 25, 2006 – December 24, 2007	Succeeded by Josh Griffith

== Awards ==
- Writers Guild of America Award: Best Script of 1992 (Television Original Longform)
- 1992 & 1994 People's Choice Award
- 1993 Viewers For Quality Television Founder’s Award (Homefront)
- Golden Globe Awards & Television Critics Association nominee for Best Drama: Homefront
- Mosaic Award from the American Jewish Committee
- Twice received Awards of Excellence in Programming from American Women in Radio and Television
- Imagen Award from the National Conference of Christians and Jews for Second Chances for that series’ positive portrayal of Latinos
- 1999 Media Access Award for Port Charles
- Easter Seals EDI Award (Equality Dignity Independence)
- Soap Opera Digest Awards: Outstanding Prime Time Show from 1989-1992; Outstanding Storyline for 1990 and 1991.
- Daytime Emmys: Outstanding Drama Series 2006-2007 for The Young and the Restless
