= Paul Satterfield =

American actor (born 1960)

- Born: Paul Parsons Sattrerfield Jr. August 19, 1960 (age 66); Nashville, Tennessee, U.S.
- Education: Whitman College
- Occupation: Actor
- Years active: 1986–2013
- Spouse: Elizabeth Wells (m. 1996; div. 2013)
- Children: 2
- Mother: Priscilla Coolidge
- Relatives: Rita Coolidge (aunt)

Paul Parsons Satterfield Jr. (born August 19, 1960) is an American actor. He is best known for his roles on daytime soap operas General Hospital (as Paul Hornsby, 1991 to 1994), The Bold and the Beautiful (as Dr. Pierce Peterson, 1998 to 1999, 2001 to 2002), and One Life to Live (as Dr. Spencer Truman, 2005 to 2007). He was also a regular cast member on the WB series Savannah (1996 to 1997).

== Early life ==
Satterfield was raised in Nashville, Tennessee and Jacksonville, Florida, because his father, Paul Sr., was a firefighter during the winter and a lifeguard during the summer. His mother is Priscilla Coolidge and his aunt is Rita Coolidge, who was married to Kris Kristofferson. After his parents' divorce, Satterfield and his sister were often looked after by their aunt. When Satterfield was in the third grade, his mother and stepfather, Booker T. Jones of Booker T. & the M.G.'s, abruptly decided to move the family to California. His mother had landed a record contract and Coolidge and Jones wished to escape the racism they encountered in Tennessee as an interracial couple.

Satterfield's family relocated to Los Angeles, then to Mendocino. He attended Whitman College in Washington on a basketball scholarship, graduating with a bachelor's degree in English. He considered playing semi-pro ball in Europe, but decided to move back to Los Angeles. He got a job painting, varnishing, and scrubbing boats in Marina del Rey.

== Career ==
Satterfield first tried acting as a teen, landing a few TV commercials. Gary Busey, a family friend, advised him, "Grow up first, there's plenty of time." He took his advice and waited until after college to begin modeling and taking acting classes.

Satterfield guest starred on an episode of Hunter in 1986. He made his first film appearance in the 1987 horror anthology Creepshow 2, playing the role of Deke in a segment based on a Stephen King's story "The Raft". He then landed a starring role in Arena in 1989.

He guest starred on The Famous Teddy Z, Just the Ten of Us, Beverly Hills, 90210, and Cheers, before being cast as Paul Hornsby on the ABC soap opera, General Hospital in 1991. He had previously auditioned for the role of Mac Scorpio (which went to John J. York). Satterfield played the role of Paul until 1994.

He then co-starred with Jennifer Lopez on the short-lived CBS series Hotel Malibu. Satterfield played Paul Steel in the mini-series Family Album, based on a novel by Danielle Steel. In 1995, he guest starred on University Hospital, Hope & Gloria, Burke's Law, New York Daze, Murder One, Flipper, and Renegade.

From 1996 to 1997, he played Tom Massick on the short-lived WB series Savannah produced by Aaron Spelling. He then had recurring roles on two other Spelling productions, Pacific Palisades and 7th Heaven. Satterfield guest-starred on Veronica's Closet, Poltergeist: The Legacy, and Love Boat: The Next Wave.

Satterfield returned to soap operas, playing the role of Dr. Pierce Peterson on The Bold and the Beautiful from 1998 to 1999 and 2001 to 2002. He guest starred on Early Edition, Profiler, The Pretender, V.I.P., Just Shoot Me!, Will & Grace, and Inside Schwartz. He played Vic Lownes in the 1999 USA Network movie Hefner: Unauthorized. Satterfield starred as Sheridan in the romantic comedy film Duty Dating in 2002.

In 2003, he guest starred on Coupling and had a role in the Jim Carrey film Bruce Almighty. In 2004, he played Richard Desmond in the film Rancid. He played Grant on Mystery Woman in 2005.

Satterfield began portraying Dr. Spencer Truman on the ABC soap opera, One Life to Live in May 2005. In 2006, he performed "The Prayer Song" on One Life: Many Voices for Hurricane Relief, an album of songs by One Life to Live actors to raise funds for victims of Hurricane Katrina. His character on One Life to Live was killed off on January 26, 2007, but Satterfield continued to make appearances via flashbacks and dreams until August 2007.

In 2011, he was cast as Lee Nelson on the second season of The Bay.

== Personal life ==
Satterfield married Elizabeth Wells in 1996 and they had two children. They are now divorced.

He finished a Masters Degree in education at Drury University in 2013 and is pursuing a career in education.

On October 2, 2014, his mother, Priscilla Coolidge and stepfather, Michael Seibert, were found dead from a murder-suicide at their home in Thousand Oaks, California. Seibert killed Coolidge with a gunshot wound to the head before turning the gun on himself.

Satterfield is often noted for his striking resemblance to Christopher Reeve, and the two were able to meet before the actor's passing. Reeve joked, "This is driving me crazy. I'm you and you're me." Satterfield agreed that the resemblance was uncanny.

== Filmography ==
=== Film ===
Year	Title	Role	Notes
1987	Creepshow 2	Deke	(segment "The Raft")
1989	Arena	Steve Armstrong	
2002	Duty Dating	Sheridan	
2003	Bruce Almighty	Dallas Coleman	
2004	Rancid	Richard Desmond	

=== Television ===
Year	Title	Role	Notes
1986	Hunter	Waiter	Episode: "Change Partners and Dance"
1989	The Famous Teddy Z	Boyfriend	Episode: "A Day at the Beach"
1990	Just the Ten of Us	Max Fleming	Episode: "Poetic Justice"
1991	Beverly Hills, 90210	Don	Episode: "One Man and a Baby"
1991–1994	General Hospital	Paul Hornsby	Contract role
1994	Family Album	Paul Steel	Mini-series 2 episodes
1994	Hotel Malibu	Mark Whitsett	Main cast 6 episodes
1995	University Hospital	Dr. Jack Gavin	Episode: "Secrets Great and Small"
1995	Hope & Gloria	J.T.	Episode: "A Fine ROM-ance"
1995	Burke's Law	Kip Sawyer	Episode: "Who Killed the Lifeguard?"
1995	New York Daze	Bicoastal Man	Episode: "Maria Moves In"
1995	Flipper	Sandy Ricks	Episode: "With Brothers Like This"
1995	Murder One (TV series)	Jake Nichols	2 episodes
1995	Renegade	Alan Frye	Episode: "Studs"
1996–1997	Savannah	Tom Massick	Main cast 34 episodes
1997	Veronica's Closet	Dan	Episode: "Veronica's Christmas Song"
1997	Pacific Palisades	John Graham	5 episodes
1997–1998	7th Heaven	Coach Koper	3 episodes
1998	Poltergeist: The Legacy	David Cord	Episode: "Stolen Hearts"
1998	Love Boat: The Next Wave	Warren McMahon	Episode: "Remember"
1998–1999, 2001–2002	The Bold and the Beautiful	Dr. Pierce Peterson	Contract role
1999	Early Edition	Paul Kettler	Episode: "The Iceman Taketh"
1999	Hefner: Unauthorized	Vic Lownes	Television film
2000	The Pretender	Agent Ted Halder	Episode: "Spin Doctor"
2000	Profiler	Agent Ted Halder	Episode: "Clean Sweep"
2000	Just Shoot Me!	Dr. Rose	Uncredited Episode: "Slamming Jack"
2000	V.I.P.	Jason Monroe	Episode: "Throw Val from the Train"
2001	Will & Grace	Sumner Davis	Episode: "Mad Dogs and Average Men"
2001	Inside Schwartz	Blake	Episode: "Pilot"
2003	Coupling	Howard	Episode: "Size Matters"
2003	Living Straight	Billy Evans	Television film
2005	Mystery Woman: Mystery Weekend	Grant	Television film
2005–2007	One Life to Live	Spencer Truman	Contract role
2011	The Bay	Lee Nelson	6 episodes
