= Ken Jenkins =

American actor (born 1940)

- Born: August 28, 1940 (age 86); Dayton, Ohio, U.S.
- Occupation: Actor
- Years active: 1974–present
- Spouse(s): Joan Patchen (m. 1958; div. 1969) Katharine Houghton (m. 1970)
- Children: 3; including Daniel Jenkins
- Relatives: Katharine Hepburn (aunt-in-law)

Ken Jenkins (born August 28, 1940) is an American actor, best known for his role as Dr. Bob Kelso, the chief of medicine on the American comedy series Scrubs (2001–2010). He has also had notable appearances in many popular TV shows.

== Early life ==
Jenkins was born in Dayton, Ohio and graduated from Wilbur Wright High School, Ohio in 1958.

== Career ==
In 1969, Jenkins joined Actors Theatre of Louisville under the leadership of Jon Jory, where he served as a company member for three years.

Jenkins appeared on episodes of Homefront, The X-Files, Babylon 5, Star Trek: The Next Generation, Wiseguy, Early Edition, and Beverly Hills, 90210.

Jenkins starred in Scrubs in the first eight seasons as a main cast member and guest-starred in the ninth and final season. His character, Dr. Bob Kelso, is his most recognizable role to date.

Jenkins has appeared in many films throughout his career, including The Wizard of Loneliness, Executive Decision, The Abyss, Air America, Last Man Standing, Fled, Gone in 60 Seconds, I Am Sam, The Sum of All Fears, Matewan, Courage Under Fire, and the 1998 remake of Psycho. He appeared as Fran Goldsmith's father in Stephen King's TV miniseries, The Stand. Jenkins also had a role in Clockstoppers.

Jenkins also had a recurring role on Cougar Town, as Jules' (Courteney Cox) father. Jenkins appears in The Blanks' music video for "Guy Love" as the owner of an L.A. bar, as he appeared with The Blanks in Scrubs, most prominently band member Sam Lloyd, who starred as regular Ted Buckland.

Jenkins portrayed U.S. Representative Howard W. Smith in the 2016 HBO TV movie All the Way, in which Smith's segregationist views posed as a central and divisive opposition to President Lyndon B. Johnson's proposal of the Civil Rights Act of 1964. Jenkins was the voice of Blister on Harvey Beaks.

Jenkins can sing and play the acoustic guitar, and is seen doing so on the Scrubs episodes "My Tuscaloosa Heart" and "My Musical", and in the Cougar Town episode "You Don't Know How It Feels".

== Filmography ==
=== Film ===
Year	Title	Role	Notes
1985	What Comes Around	Larry	
1987	Matewan	Sephus Purcell	
1988	The Wizard of Loneliness	Joel Spender	
1989	The Abyss	Gerard Kirkhill	
1989	In Country	Jim Holly	
1990	Air America	Major Donald Lemond	
1991	Edge of Honor	Bo Dubs	
1992	Crossing the Bridge	Lou Morgan	
1996	Executive Decision	General Wood	
1996	Last Dance	Warden Laverty	
1996	Courage Under Fire	Joel Walden	
1996	Fled	Warden Nichols	
1996	Last Man Standing	Capt. Tom Pickett	
1998	Where's Marlowe?	Linguist	
1998	Psycho	District Attorney	
1999	The Last Marshal	Judge Wooley	
2000	Gone in 60 Seconds	Televangelist	Uncredited
2000	Lucky Numbers	Dan Schuff	
2001	The Tailor of Panama	Morecombe	
2001	I Am Sam	Judge McNeily	
2002	Clockstoppers	NSA Agent Moore	
2002	Home Room	Police Captain	
2002	The Sum of All Fears	Admiral Pollack	
2007	Welcome to Paradise	Reverend McNamara	

=== Television ===
Year	Title	Role	Notes
1971	Great Performances	Aubin	Episode: "In Fashion"
1985	The Equalizer	Sheriff	Episode: "The Children's Song"
1988	CBS Summer Playhouse	Dwayne Pewe	Episode: "Whattley by the Bay"
1988	Amen	The Pilot	Episode: "Fear of Flying"
1988	Newhart	Al Griswold	Episode: "Town Without Pity"
1988	Knots Landing	Border Thug #1	Episode: "Borderline"
1988	Disaster at Silo 7	Clarence	TV movie
1988	Dallas	Captain	Episode: "Road Work"
1988–1990	Wiseguy	Paul Beckstead	Recurring role (seasons 2–4)
1989	CBS Schoolbreak Special	Echer	Episode: "Words to Live By"
1989	Unconquered	Dr. Smith	TV movie
1989	Hard Time on Planet Earth	Sergeant Burdick	Episode: "Losing Control"
1989	Roe vs. Wade		TV movie
1989	Breaking Point	Col. Lowe	TV movie
1989	Star Trek: The Next Generation	Dr. Paul Stubbs	Episode: "Evolution"
1989	One Life to Live	Howard McGillis	1 episode
1990	Family of Spies		2 episodes
1990	Mancuso, F.B.I.		3 episodes
1990	By Dawn's Early Light	Looking Glass Colonel Sam	TV movie
1990	Shattered Dreams	Hal Witt	TV movie
1990	Gabriel's Fire	Potter	Episode: "I'm Nobody"
1990	Descending Angel	Sam Murray	TV movie
1991	In Broad Daylight	Bob Webb	TV movie
1991	Evening Shade	Judge	Episode: "The Trials of Wood Newton"
1991	Love, Lies and Murder	Rubright	Miniseries
1991	Thirtysomething	Lars Durstin	Episode: "A Stop at Willoughby"
1991	A Private Matter	Frank Kearns	TV movie
1991–1993	Homefront	Mike Sloan Sr.	42 episodes
1993	And the Band Played On	Dr. Dennis Donohue	TV movie
1993	Sisters	Judge Guisewite	Episode: "Back on Track"
1993	Mad About You	Jack Farrer	Episode: "Married to the Job"
1994	In the Best of Families	Bob Newsom	Miniseries
1994	A Time to Heal	Don Peterson	TV movie
1994	Hearts Afire	Mr. Conway	Episode: "The Big Yes"
1994	The Stand	Peter Goldsmith	Miniseries, episode: "The Plague"
1994	White Mile	Jerry Taggart	TV movie
1995	Cybill	Ed	Episode: "As the World Turns to Crap"
1995	Legend	Ethan Catridge Steele	Episode: "Legend on His President's Secret Service"
1995	Past the Bleachers	Milton	TV movie
1995	Hiroshima	James F. Byrnes	TV movie
1995–2000	Chicago Hope	Health Marshal Stanley McGee / Jim Carroll	2 episodes
1996	The Lazarus Man	Preacher	Episode: "The Penance"
1997	High Incident	Burt	Episode: "No Money Down"
1997	NYPD Blue	Marshall Hastings	Episode: "I Love Lucy"
1997	Babylon 5	Captain Trevor Hall	Episode: "No Surrender, No Retreat"
1997	Murphy Brown	Sen. Paul Cookson	Episode: "Tempus Fugit"
1998	The Magnificent Seven	Frank	Episode: "Witness"
1998	Thirst	Lou Wolford	TV movie
1998	Early Edition	Winston Thorpe	Episode: "Deadline"
1998–1999	Oh Baby	Fred Calloway	4 episodes
1999	Vengeance Unlimited	Jack Humphrey	Episode: "Legalese"
1999	Balloon Farm	Banker	TV movie
1999	Mutiny		TV movie
1999	Pensacola: Wings of Gold	General Mitchell Burke	Episode: "Burke's Breach"
1999–2000	Beverly Hills, 90210	Pastor Neal	3 episodes (season 10)
1999–2000	Sliders	Robert Clark / Professor Jack Bigelow	2 episodes
2000	Brutally Normal	Mr. Kirschner / Thomas Jefferson	Episode: "Barricade"
2000	Family Law	Judge William Jankowski	2 episodes
2001	The X-Files	Deputy Chief Karras	Episode: "Medusa"
2001	All Souls	Dr. Lohman	Episode: "Running Scared"
2001–2010	Scrubs	Doctor Robert Kelso	Main cast
2002	Fidel	Herbert Matthews	TV movie
2010–2015	Cougar Town	Chick	Recurring role (seasons 2–6)
2012–2015	Gravity Falls	Pa Duskerton (voice)	2 episodes
2013	Back in the Game	Warden	Episode: "Stay in or Bail Out"
2014	Black-ish	Bernie	Episode: "Colored Commentary"
2016	All the Way	Howard W. Smith	TV movie
2017	Harvey Beaks	Blister / Old Man #1 (voice)	3 episodes
2018	A Series of Unfortunate Events	Elder Sam	2 episodes
2019	Girls Weekend	Tom	TV movie

=== Music videos ===
Year	Title	Artist(s)	Role
2011	"Guy Love"	The Blanks	Bar owner
