= Shanesia Davis-Williams =

American actress (born 1966)

- Born: September 30, 1966 (age 59); Detroit, Michigan, US
- Other names: Shanesia Davis; Shanésia Davis; Shane Williams
- Occupation: Actor
- Known for: Co-starring on Early Edition

Shanesia Davis-Williams (also Shanesia Davis, Shanésia Davis, and Shane Williams; born September 30, 1966) is an American actress who co-starred as Marissa Clark on the television series Early Edition.

== Personal life ==
Born in Detroit, Michigan on September 30, 1966, as of 2005, Shanesia Davis-Williams was living in Chicago.

== Career ==
Davis-Williams has acted in film, stage, and television. In March 2019, she was best known as Marissa Clark, the co-starring role she played in the CBS TV series Early Edition. As of February 2022, Davis taught theatre at The Theatre School at DePaul University and the University of Illinois Chicago.

=== Performance credits ===
Film performances
Year	Title	Role	Citation(s)
1998	Chicago Cab	Lawyer	
2003	Uncle Nino	Lorita	
2005	The Weather Man		
2015	Consumed		

Stage performances
Year(s)	Title	Role	Location	Citation(s)
2008	The Glass Menagerie	Amanda	Steppenwolf Downstairs Theatre (Chicago)	
2019	Landladies	Marti	Northlight Theatre (Chicago)	
	Cymbeline	Queen	Chicago Shakespeare Theater	
