= Arena (1989 film) =

- Theatrical release poster
- Directed by: Peter Manoogian
- Written by: Danny Bilson; Paul De Meo
- Produced by: Irwin Yablans
- Starring: Paul Satterfield; Hamilton Camp; Claudia Christian
- Cinematography: Mac Ahlberg
- Edited by: Andy Horvitch
- Music by: Richard Band
- Distributed by: Empire Pictures
- Release date: March 29, 1989
- Running time: 93 minutes
- Countries: Italy; United States
- Language: English
- Budget: $6 million

Arena is a 1989 American science fiction action film directed by Peter Manoogian and starring Paul Satterfield and Claudia Christian. Set in 4038, Satterfield plays Steve Armstrong, the first human in 50 years to compete in the intergalactic boxing sport called simply "The Arena." The film was produced by Irwin Yablans and features original music by Richard Band.

== Plot ==
Steve Armstrong works as a short order cook on a space station somewhere in the galaxy. Overwhelmed by the volume of orders, he repeatedly fouls up and soon finds himself in a confrontation with an alien patron named Vang. After a fight which smashes up the diner and leaves the alien injured, Steve and his friend and co-worker Shorty are fired. As it turns out, Vang is an Arena fighter, and his manager Quinn confronts Steve. Amazed that a human could beat one of her best fighters, Quinn offers him a contract, but convinced that humans no longer have a place in the Arena, Steve refuses, intending to make his way back to Earth.

Lacking sufficient money for a ticket, Shorty attempts to raise the cash by gambling in an underground casino. The game is raided by the authorities and in the confusion, Shorty pockets the money. Caught in the act by crime boss and top Arena fight manager Rogor and his enforcer Weezil, Shorty is held for ransom. Steve promises to pay off the debt, so he reluctantly returns to Quinn and agrees to a contract with her, using the money to free Shorty. Remarkably Steve wins his first match with an alien named Sloth in an upset. After seeing Steve's potential, Rogor attempts to contract Steve as his Arena fighter but learns Steve has already signed with Quinn. Steve continues fighting, determined to prove that a human has what it takes to be champion, and soon becomes a top contender.

Rogor becomes worried that his high position in Arena fighting could be jeopardized if Steve wins the championship, so he enlists his consort Jade to seduce Steve and poison him the night before the championship fight with Rogor's top fighter and reigning champion, an alien cyborg named Horn. But medics are able to counteract the poison minutes before the fight, and Steve appears in the Arena surprising Rogor and Jade. Rogor then resorts to Weezil's plan of hacking into the computer controlling the handicap technology used to ensure fair fights. Weezil's accomplice, Skull, successfully interfaces with the computer located in the catwalk high above the Arena and gains control of the handicap, causing Steve to be severely impaired during the second round of the fight with Horn. Shorty quickly suspects foul play and leaves to investigate, finding Weezil and Skull in the computer room. While fighting off Weezil, Shorty damages part of the computer which in turn causes Skull's head to explode. With the handicap computer offline Steve regains his full abilities and ultimately defeats Horn, becoming the first human champion in 50 years.

== Cast ==
- Paul Satterfield as Steve Armstrong, Young human fighter who wants to break into the alien fighting arena game.
- Hamilton Camp as Shorty, A family man from Nebulos who befriends Steve, seems to have contacts all over the underworld of the station.
- Claudia Christian as Quinn, Manager of a small ring of fighters she inherited from her father.
- Marc Alaimo as Rogor, Casino owner, manager of Horn, and all around underworld boss.
- Shari Shattuck as Jade, Night club singer and Rogor's woman.
- Armin Shimerman as Weezil, Rogor's enforcer.
- Brett Porter as Wayne
- Charles Tabansi as Troy
- Michael Deak as Horn, Rogor's top fighter and reigning Arena champion, an extremely violent and arrogant cyborg alien.
- Jack Carter as Announcer
- William Butler as Skull, A high strung-cybernetic alien always looking to make a quick buck.
- Grady Clarkson as Commissioner Dent
- Dave Thompson as Doctor
- Ken Clark as Marcus Diablo, The last human Arena champion, now homeless, living in the tubes of the space station.
- Diana Rose as Space Lady In Nightclub

Starting in 1993, Shimerman & Alaimo would work together on Star Trek: Deep Space Nine as Quark & Gul Dukat respectively.

== Reception ==
Lawrence Cohn of Variety called it "an above-average fantasy." Michael Weldon wrote in The Psychotronic Video Guide to Film, "If you liked TV shows like Battlestar Galactica, you might make it through this juvenile, PG-13, science fiction comedy from Charles Band."

== See also ==
- Arena (short story)
- Arena (Star Trek: The Original Series)
- Fun and Games (The Outer Limits)
- List of sports films
- List of films featuring space stations
