= Hotel Malibu =

American drama television series

- Genre: Drama; Soap opera
- Created by: Lynn Marie Latham; Bernard Lechowick
- Developed by: James Stanley; Diane Messina Stanley
- Starring: Jennifer Lopez; Joanna Cassidy; Pepe Serna; Cheryl Pollak; Romy Walthall; John Dye; Harry O'Reilly
- Composer: Mark Mothersbaugh
- Country of origin: United States
- Original language: English
- No. of seasons: 1
- No. of episodes: 6

Production
- Executive producers: Lynn Marie Latham; Bernard Lechowick
- Producers: James Stanley; Deepak Nayar
- Camera setup: Single-camera
- Running time: 60 minutes (with commercials)
- Production companies: Latham-Lechowick Productions; ITC Entertainment

Original release
- Network: CBS
- Release: August 4 – September 8, 1994

Hotel Malibu is an American drama television series that aired on CBS from August 4 to September 8, 1994 and was created and written by producers Bernard Lechowick and Lynn Marie Latham. Its cast includes Jennifer Lopez, Joanna Cassidy, Harry Reilly, and John Dye. The pilot episode was directed by Sharron Miller. It was a spin-off of the show Second Chances.

== Premise ==
The series centered on the Mayfield family who ran the Hotel Malibu in California.

== Cast ==
- Joanna Cassidy as Eleanor Mayfield, hotel owner
- John Dye as Jack Mayfield, Eleanor's son
- Jennifer Lopez as Melinda Lopez, hotel bartender, reprising her role from Second Chances
- Harry O'Reilly as Harry Radzimski, hotel bartender
- Cheryl Pollak as Stephanie Mayfield, Eleanor's daughter
- Pepe Serna as Salvatore Lopez, Melinda's father, reprising his role from Second Chances
- Romy Walthall as Nancy Radzimski Salvucci, Harry's sister

== Episodes ==
No.	Title	Directed by	Original release date
1	"The Bed, the Bribe and the Body"	Sharron Miller	August 4, 1994
2	"Do Not Disturb"	Lorraine Senna Ferrara	August 11, 1994
3	"Swim at Your Own Risk"	Stefan Scaini	August 18, 1994
4	"Fire Exit"	Gene Reynolds	August 25, 1994
5	"Double Booked"	Stefan Scaini	September 1, 1994
6	"Advance Reservations"	Gene Reynolds	September 8, 1994
