= James Stanley (writer) =

American TV writer, producer and actor

James Stanley is an American TV writer, producer and actor. He has also been credited as James Carl Stanley and Jim Stanley. He is married to Diane Messina Stanley, who is also a writer.

== Positions held ==
- The Young and the Restless (October 2006 - December 22, 2007; April 4, 2008 - January 2009: Breakdown Writer)
- Knots Landing (October 1988 - May 1990: Head Writer. 1985-1988 script writer)
- Strong Medicine
- Judging Amy
- That's Life (hired by Diane Ruggiero)
- Pacific Palisades
- Savannah
- Early Edition
- Homefront
- Second Chances
- Hotel Malibu (Producer)
- Road to Avonlea (Executive Consultant)
- Here's Boomer
- Magnum, P.I.
- The Girl From Monday
- Dragon Ball Z
