= Homefront (American TV series) =

American television drama series

- Genre: Soap opera; Historical drama
- Created by: Lynn Marie Latham; Bernard Lechowick
- Starring: Kyle Chandler; Sammi Davis; Ken Jenkins; Mimi Kennedy; Tammy Lauren; Sterling Macer Jr.; David Newsom; Harry O'Reilly; Wendy Phillips; Kelly Rutherford; Giuliana Santini; John Slattery; Jessica Steen; Dick Anthony Williams; Alexandra Wilson; Hattie Winston
- Theme music composer: Harold Arlen; Johnny Mercer
- Opening theme: "Accentuate the Positive" performed by Jack Sheldon
- Composer: Stewart Levin
- Country of origin: United States
- Original language: English
- No. of seasons: 2
- No. of episodes: 42 (list of episodes)

Production
- Executive producers: David Jacobs; Lynn Marie Latham; Bernard Lechowick
- Producer: Christopher Chulack
- Production companies: Roundelay Productions; Latham-Lechowick Productions; Lorimar Television

Original release
- Network: ABC
- Release: September 24, 1991 – April 26, 1993

Homefront is an American television drama series created by former Knots Landing producers Lynn Marie Latham and Bernard Lechowick in association with Lorimar Television. The show is set in the mid 1940s in the fictional city of River Run, Ohio, and aired on ABC from September 24, 1991, to April 26, 1993. The show's theme song, "Accentuate the Positive", was written by Harold Arlen and Johnny Mercer and performed by Jack Sheldon.

== Series overview ==
Homefront begins in September 1945 and focuses on three families from different backgrounds, the Sloans, Metcalf and Davis families. The Sloans, Mike Sr. and Ruth (Ken Jenkins and Mimi Kennedy), own a steel manufacturing factory initially responsible for making tank parts in the war. They are coming to grips with the death of their only son, Mike Jr., a soldier, and the arrival of his Italian war bride, Gina (Giuliana Santini), a Jewish Holocaust survivor. The Metcalfs include widow Anne (Wendy Phillips) and her three children, Hank (David Newsom), Linda (Jessica Steen) and Jeff (Kyle Chandler). Anne and Linda are dealing with being displaced from their job at the plant for returning GIs, while Hank, a returning soldier, and Jeff, a baseball player for the Cleveland Indians, are involved in a love triangle with college student Sarah Brewer (Alexandra Wilson). Meanwhile, Linda's friend, Ginger Szabo (Tammy Lauren) is shocked when her boyfriend Charlie Hailey (Harry O'Reilly) returns from the war with a British war-bride, Caroline (Sammi Davis).

Abe (Dick Anthony Williams) and Gloria Davis (Hattie Winston) are descendants from slaves and work for the Sloans as a chauffeur and housekeeper respectively. Their son Robert (Sterling Macer, Jr.) is a decorated veteran who served in Europe with the 761st Armored Battalion. He lands a job at Sloan Industries but is isolated and belittled by his racist co-workers. In the second season, he is joined by Perrette (Perrey Reeves), his white French war bride. Later cast members include Al Kahn (John Slattery), a Jewish union organiser and possible former Communist sympathiser who seduces Anne, and Judy Owens (Kelly Rutherford), a widow working as a bartender who has an affair with Mike Sr.

While the show received critical praise, it struggled in the ratings and was close to being cancelled after its first season. An April 11, 1992 issue of TV Guide ran a S.O.S (Save Our Shows) campaign to save five series from cancellation, which included Homefront, and two other period pieces (set in the 1950s), Brooklyn Bridge on CBS and I'll Fly Away on NBC. Of the five, Homefront received the most votes – 99,591 – and was subsequently renewed. Abigail Van Buren of Dear Abby also dedicated a column to the show, urging fans to write into the network to save it. However ratings did not improve in its second season, and after being moved around the schedule numerous times, the show was cancelled.

== Cast and characters ==
- Kyle Chandler as Jeff Metcalf
- Sammi Davis-Voss as Caroline Hailey
- Ken Jenkins as Mike Sloan, Sr.
- Mimi Kennedy as Ruth Sloan
- Tammy Lauren as Ginger Szabo
- Sterling Macer, Jr. as Cpl. Robert Davis (season 1 & eps. 1–4 of season 2)
- David Newsom as Lt. Hank Metcalf (season 1)
- Harry O'Reilly as Sgt. Charlie Hailey
- Wendy Phillips as Anne Metcalf Kahn
- Giuliana Santini as Gina Sloan
- Jessica Steen as Linda Metcalf
- Dick Anthony Williams as Abe Davis
- Alexandra Wilson as Sarah Brewer (eps. 1–20)
- Hattie Winston as Gloria Davis
- John Slattery as Al Kahn (eps. 5+)
- Kelly Rutherford as Judy Owen (season 2; recurring season 1)

== Episodes ==
Season	Episodes	Originally released	
Season	Episodes	First released	Last released
1	24	September 24, 1991	April 15, 1992
2	18	September 17, 1992	April 26, 1993

=== Season 1 (1991–92) ===
No. overall	No. in season	Title	Directed by	Written by	Original release date	Prod. code	Viewers (millions)
1	1	"S.N.A.F.U."	Ron Lagomarsino	Lynn Marie Latham & Bernard Lechowick	September 24, 1991	447151	12.2
2	2	"Take My Hand"	Lorraine Senna Ferrara	Bernard Lechowick	July 13, 1992 (Note: This episode aired out-of-order after the show's initial run, as ABC felt it was "too depressing" for new viewers.)	447152	8.5
3	3	"Bedsprings"	David Carson	Lynn Marie Latham	October 1, 1991	447153	11.5
4	4	"So All Alone"	Lorraine Senna Ferrara	Bernard Lechowick	October 8, 1991	447154	11.5
5	5	"Patriots"	Nicholas Sgarro	Bernard Lechowick	October 15, 1991	447155	10.2
6	6	"Holier Than Thou, Too"	Bruce Seth Green	Bernard Lechowick	October 29, 1991	447156	10.7
7	7	"Toledo"	Nicholas Sgarro	Lynn Marie Latham	November 12, 1991	447157	12.2
8	8	"Kids"	Bruce Seth Green	Diane Messina Stanley	November 19, 1991	447158	9.1
9	9	"Man, This Joint is Jumping"	Félix Enríquez Alcalá	Lynn Marie Latham	November 26, 1991	447159	10.9
10	10	"Splitting Hairs"	Bruce Seth Green	Bernard Lechowick	December 3, 1991	447160	11.0
11	11	"Szabo's Travels"	Félix Enríquez Alcalá	Lynn Marie Latham	December 10, 1991	447161	9.4
12	12	"Sinners Reconciled"	Lorraine Senna Ferrara	Bernard Lechowick	December 17, 1991	447162	10.8
13	13	"All Theses Things Will I Give to Thee"	David Carson	Lynn Marie Latham	January 7, 1992	447163	10.4
14	14	"When It Rains, It Pours"	Bruce Seth Green	Bernard Lechowick	January 14, 1992	447164	10.9
15	15	"That's the Way the Cookie Crumbles"	Anita Addison	Lynn Marie Latham	January 28, 1992	447165	8.8
16	16	"Bad Connection"	Lorraine Senna Ferrara	Bernard Lechowick	February 4, 1992	447166	11.0
17	17	"Getting to First Base"	Bruce Seth Green	Lynn Marie Latham & Bernard Lechowick	February 18, 1992	447167	11.6
18	18	"No Man Loyal and Neutral"	David Carson	David Assael	March 4, 1992	447168	10.3
19	19	"First Sign of Spring"	Lorraine Senna Ferrara	Bernard Lechowick	March 11, 1992	447169	9.5
20	20	"At Your Age"	David Carson	Bernard Lechowick	March 18, 1992	447170	10.7
21	21	"Obstinacy or Constancy?"	Joseph L. Scanlan	Bernard Lechowick	March 25, 1992	447171	9.0
22	22	"If You Want it Done Right..."	Lorraine Senna Ferrara	Bernard Lechowick	April 1, 1992	447172	10.3
23	23	"Spanish Moss"	Joseph L. Scanlan	Lynn Marie Latham & James Stanley	April 8, 1992	447173	9.3
24	24	"Songs Unsung Are Sweetest"	Nicholas Sgarro	Bernard Lechowick	April 15, 1992	447174	11.1

=== Season 2 (1992–93) ===
No. overall	No. in season	Title	Directed by	Written by	Original release date	Prod. code	Viewers (millions)
25	1	"By Popular Demand"	Joseph L. Scanlan	Bernard Lechowick	September 17, 1992	447701	9.2
26	2	"The Lemo Tomato Juice Hour"	Sharron Miller	Lynn Marie Latham	September 24, 1992	447702	8.3
27	3	"Can't Say No"	Roy Campanella II	Diane Messina Stanley	October 1, 1992	447703	8.7
28	4	"Appleknocker to Wed Tomatohawker"	Joseph L. Scanlan	Bernard Lechowick	October 8, 1992	447704	9.8
29	5	"A Nickel Plate Romance"	Mike Vejar	Lynn Marie Latham	October 22, 1992	447705	8.1
30	6	"When the Stars Begin to Fall"	Sharron Miller	Bernard Lechowick	October 29, 1992	447706	8.7
31	7	"The Traveling Lemo All-Stars"	Lorraine Senna Ferrara	Lynn Marie Latham	November 11, 1992	447707	8.1
32	8	"First Comes Love, Then Comes Marriage"	Sharron Miller	Bernard Lechowick	December 3, 1992	447708	7.7
33	9	"Life Is Short"	Mike Vejar	Bernard Lechowick	December 17, 1992	447709	7.2
34	10	"Signed, Crazy in Love"	Christopher Chulack	James Stanley	March 9, 1993	447710	9.6
35	11	"On the Rebound"	Mike Vejar	Bernard Lechowick	April 23, 2000 (Note: This episode was never aired by ABC during its initial run, and premiered on April 23, 2000 as part of a Homefront marathon on TV Land.)	447711	unaired
36	12	"Like Being There When You're Not"	Mike Vejar	Bernard Lechowick	March 16, 1993	447713	9.4
37	13	"Who, What, Where, When, Why, and How"	Sharron Miller	Lynn Marie Latham	March 23, 1993	447714	11.0
38	14	"Garfield Slept Here"	Mike Vejar	Lynn Marie Latham	March 30, 1993	447715	10.0
39	15	"By Word or Act"	Sharron Miller	Bernard Lechowick	April 6, 1993	447716	9.0
40	16	"The Lacemakers"	Sharron Miller	Bernard Lechowick	April 13, 1993	447712	10.6
41	17	"Shabbat Shalom"	Mike Vejar	Diane Messina Stanley & James Stanley	April 26, 1993	447717	8.8
42	18	"All Good Things"	Sharron Miller	Bernard Lechowick	April 26, 1993	447718	8.8

== Awards and nominations ==
Year	Award	Category	Recipient	Result
1992	American Cinema Editors' Eddie Award	Best Edited Episode from a Television Series	Michael B. Hoggan and William B. Stich (For episode "S.N.A.F.U.")	Nominated
1992	Casting Society of America's Artios Award	Best Casting for TV, Pilot	Irene Mariano	Nominated
1992	Casting Society of America's Artios Award	Best Casting for TV, Dramatic Episodic	Irene Mariano	Nominated
1992	Golden Globe Award	Best Supporting Actress – Series, Miniseries or Television Film	Sammi Davis	Nominated
1992	People's Choice Awards	Favorite New TV Dramatic Series	Homefront	Won
1992	Primetime Emmy Award	Outstanding Made for Television Movie	Christopher Chulack, David Jacobs, Lynn Marie Latham and Bernard Lechowick (For episode "S.N.A.F.U.")	Nominated
1992	Primetime Emmy Award	Outstanding Directing for a Miniseries, Movie or a Dramatic Special	Ron Lagomarsino (For episode "S.N.A.F.U.")	Nominated
1992	Primetime Emmy Award	Outstanding Hairstyling for a Series	Jerry Gugliemotto and Barbara Ronci (For episode "Man, This Joint Is Jumping")	Won
1992	Primetime Emmy Award	Outstanding Hairstyling for a Miniseries or a Special	Jerry Gugliemotto and Georgina Williams (For episode "S.N.A.F.U.")	Nominated
1992	Primetime Emmy Award	Outstanding Editing for a Miniseries or a Special - Single-Camera Production	Michael B. Hoggan and William B. Stich (For episode "S.N.A.F.U.")	Nominated
1992	Primetime Emmy Award	Outstanding Costuming for a Series	Chic Gennarelli and Lyn Paolo (For episode "At Your Age")	Won
1992	Primetime Emmy Award	Outstanding Costuming for a Miniseries or a Special	Nanrose Buchman, Chic Gennarelli and Lyn Paolo (For episode "S.N.A.F.U.")	Nominated
1992	Primetime Emmy Award	Outstanding Art Direction for a Miniseries or a Special	Anne D. McCulley and Dean E. Mitzner (For episode "S.N.A.F.U.")	Nominated
1992	Television Critics Association Award	Outstanding Achievement in Drama	Homefront	Nominated
1993	American Television Awards	Best Dramatic Series	Homefront	Nominated
1993	American Television Awards	Best Supporting Actress, Dramatic Series	Mimi Kennedy	Nominated
1993	Golden Globe Award	Best Television Series – Drama	Homefront	Nominated
1993	Primetime Emmy Award	Outstanding Drama Series	Lynn Marie Latham, Bernard Lechowick, David Jacobs, Diane Messina Stanley, James Stanley and Christopher Chulack	Nominated
1993	Primetime Emmy Award	Outstanding Writing for a Drama Series	Bernard Lechowick (For episode "The Lacemakeres")	Nominated
1993	Primetime Emmy Award	Outstanding Hairstyling for a Series	Jerry Gugliemotto and Georgina Williams (For episode "Life Is Short")	Nominated
1993	Primetime Emmy Award	Outstanding Costuming for a Series	Chic Gennarelli and Lyn Paolo (For episode "Like Being There When You're Not")	Won
1993	Primetime Emmy Award	Outstanding Art Direction for a Miniseries or a Special	Dean E. Mitzner and Tom Pedigo (For episode "The Traveling Lemo All-Stars")	Won
1993	Television Critics Association Award	Outstanding Achievement in Drama	Homefront	Nominated
1993	Viewers for Quality Television Award	Best Supporting Actress in a Quality Drama Series	Mimi Kennedy	Nominated
1993	Viewers for Quality Television Award	Founder's Award	Lynn Marie Latham, Bernard Lechowick, David Jacobs, Diane Messina Stanley, James Stanley and Christopher Chulack	Won
1993	Writers Guild of America Award	Original Long Form	Lynn Marie Latham and Bernard Lechowick (For episode "S.N.A.F.U.")	Won
