= Savannah (TV series) =

American TV series

- Title Card
- Genre: Soap opera
- Created by: Constance M. Burge
- Developed by: Diane Messina Stanley; James Stanley
- Written by: Constance M. Burge; Diane Messina Stanley; James Stanley; Lynn Marie Latham; Bernard Lechowick
- Starring: Shannon Sturges; Robyn Lively; Jamie Luner; Paul Satterfield; David Gail; Beth Toussaint; Ray Wise; George Eads; Alexia Robinson
- Theme music composer: Christopher L. Stone
- Composers: Gary S. Scott; Ken Harrison; Dan Foliart
- Country of origin: United States
- Original language: English
- No. of seasons: 2
- No. of episodes: 34

Production
- Executive producers: Diane Messina Stanley; James Stanley; Aaron Spelling; E. Duke Vincent
- Producers: Christopher Seitz; James T. Davis
- Production locations: Atlanta and Savannah, Georgia
- Cinematography: Frank E. Johnson; Steven Shaw
- Camera setup: Single-camera
- Running time: 45 Minutes
- Production company: Spelling Television

Original release
- Network: The WB
- Release: January 21, 1996 – February 24, 1997

Savannah is an American prime time television soap opera produced by Spelling Television that ran from January 21, 1996, to February 24, 1997, on The WB. Created by Constance M. Burge and produced by Aaron Spelling, the series was introduced as a mid-season replacement during the 1995-96 television season. It was the first one-hour program to air on The WB network.

== Plot ==
Set in the southern city of Savannah, Georgia, the series revolves around three female friends: naive rich girl Reese Burton (Shannon Sturges), noble Lane McKenzie (Robyn Lively), and scheming bad girl Peyton Richards (Jamie Luner). Lane had previously left Savannah after graduating from college to become a successful journalist in New York City, but returns for the wedding of her childhood best friend Reese to Travis Peterson (George Eads). Finding out that her apartment in New York has been burglarized, Lane tries to collect on an inheritance, but discovers that Travis has stolen every penny of it. Travis has also, as Reese is devastated to discover, been having an affair with a girl he calls "Bunny", who is actually Peyton, Reese's so-called friend and daughter of the Burton family's maid. Peyton envies Reese's wealth and is keen to marry for money.

Travis is soon found dead, and the first season revolves around the whodunit murder mystery and subsequent court case. Considerable intrigue surrounds the machinations of Tom Massick (Paul Satterfield), a stranger with a score to settle, as well as the identity of Peyton's father, who turns out to be Reese's father Edward (Ray Wise), making Peyton and Reese half-sisters. Cassandra "Cassie" Wheeler (Alexia Robinson), longtime friend of the three other women, joined the cast in the second season, and Eads returned as Travis's identical twin Nick.

== Cast and characters ==
= Main cast (Opening credits)
= Recurring cast (3+ episodes)
= Guest cast (1–2 episodes)

Actor	Character	Seasons	
Actor	Character	1	2
Main cast
Robyn Lively	Lane McKenzie	Main	Main
Jamie Luner	Peyton Richards	Main	Main
Shannon Sturges	Reese Burton	Main	Main
David Gail	Dean Collins	Main	Main
Paul Satterfield	Tom Massick	Main	Main
Beth Toussaint	Veronica Koslowski	Main	Main
Ray Wise	Edward Burton	Main	Main
George Eads	Travis Peterson	Recurring	
George Eads	Nick Corelli	Guest (Note: Credited as "Special Appearance by")	Main
Alexia Robinson	Cassie Wheeler		Main (Note: Robinson appears in a recurring role from "Diary of a Mad Rich Wife" (2.9) onwards, before being added to the opening credits from "Dressed to Shill" (2.15).)
Recurring cast
Wendy Phillips	Lucille Richards	Recurring	Guest (Note: Credited as "Special Guest Star")
Jay Baker	Harry	Recurring	
Taurean Blacque	Detective Michael Wheeler	Recurring	Recurring
Shannon Kenny	Jeannie Collins	Recurring	
David Lee Smith	Vincent Massick	Recurring (Note: Credited as "Also starring")	
Scott Thompson Baker	Brian Alexander	Recurring	Recurring
Mimi Kennedy	Eleanor Alexander	Guest	Recurring
Ted Shackelford	Charles Alexander		Recurring
Bever-Leigh Banfield	Grace Voyer		Recurring
Brian McNamara	Terrence Goodson		Recurring
Eduardo Yáñez	Benny Serna		Recurring
Russell Curry	Detective Sam Lucas		Recurring
Jocelyn Seagrave	Rita Winsler		Recurring
Rebecca Chambers	Sonny Lee Barrett		Recurring
Anthony Griffith	Bill Webber		Recurring
Guest cast
Scott Paetty	Matt Carter	Guest	
Debbie James	Madeline Stewart		Guest
Denis Arndt	Martin Corelli		Guest

== Episodes ==
=== Series overview ===
Season	Episodes	Originally released	
Season	Episodes	First released	Last released
1	12	January 21, 1996	April 7, 1996
2	22	August 26, 1996	February 24, 1997

=== Season 1 (1996) ===
No. overall	No. in season	Title	Directed by	Written by	Original release date	U.S. viewers (millions)
1	1	"Wedding Belle Blues"	Richard Lang	Dianne Messina Stanley & James Stanley	January 21, 1996	4.8
2	2	"Wedding Belle Blues"	Richard Lang	Dianne Messina Stanley & James Stanley	January 21, 1996	4.8
Part 1: Lane MacKenzie, a sensible aspiring journalist living in New York City, returns to her hometown of Savannah, Georgia for the wedding of her best friend Reese Burton, a wealthy, trusting, virginal, very naïve Southern belle, to Travis Peterson, a wealthy bank employee who is secretly embezzling funds from the local bank. Lane and Reese's best friend, the scheming and amoral Peyton Richards, daughter of the Burtons' housekeeper, seductively influences Travis to steal Lane's life savings. Part 2: Following Travis' death, Peyton worries that she might have killed him by hitting him on the head with a liquor bottle.
3	3	"Sex, Pies and Videotape"	Eleanore Lindo	Constance M. Burge	February 4, 1996	4.6
4	4	"Who Killed Travis?"	Harry Harris	Lynn Marie Latham	February 11, 1996	4.6
5	5	"The Purloined Letter"	Eleanore Lindo	Lawrence H. Levy	February 18, 1996	4.5
6	6	"Where There's Smoke, There's Fire"	Harry Harris	Lynn Marie Latham	February 25, 1996	5.2
7	7	"Information, Please"	James Darren	James Stanley	March 3, 1996	4.9
8	8	"Playing With the Enemy"	Harvey Frost	Lynn Marie Latham	March 10, 1996	4.3
9	9	"Prince of Lies"	Parker Stevenson	Constance M. Burge	March 17, 1996	4.7
10	10	"From Here to Paternity"	Eleanore Lindo	Bernardo Solano	March 24, 1996	4.8
11	11	"Creep Throat"	Harvey Frost	Constance M. Burge & Liz Coe	March 31, 1996	4.6
12	12	"The Truth, the Whole Truth and Nothing But the Truth"	Eleanore Lindo	Constance M. Burge & Dianne Messina Stanley & James Stanley	April 7, 1996	4.0

=== Season 2 (1996–97) ===
No. overall	No. in season	Title	Directed by	Written by	Original release date	U.S. viewers (millions)
13	1	"Dead Man Walking"	Harvey Frost	James Stanley & Diane Messina Stanley	August 26, 1996	3.6
14	2	"Pearls Before Swine"	Eleanore Lindo	Constance M. Burge	September 23, 1996	2.9
15	3	"The Family Jewels"	Harvey Frost	Bernard Lechowick	September 30, 1996	2.8
Peyton and Nick outfox each other in their quest for the elusive Centurion Emerald; Tom tries to save Reese from the trumped-up drug possession charges by seducing a policewoman; and Dean and Reese follow up a lead to an old farmhouse to rescue Lane. Just when all seems lost, Peyton gets a glittery surprise.
16	4	"A Picture Is Worth..."	Eleanore Lindo	Michael Perricone & Greg Elliot	October 7, 1996	2.6
17	5	"My Fair Ladies"	Harvey Frost	Lynn Marie Latham	October 14, 1996	3.4
18	6	"Vengeance Is Mine"	Eleanore Lindo	Bernard Lechowick	October 21, 1996	3.6
19	7	"It's a Mad, Mad, Mad, Mad Boat"	Richard Lang	Constance M. Burge	October 28, 1996	3.7
20	8	"Burn, Baby, Burn"	Stefan Scaini	James Stanley & Lynn Marie Latham	November 4, 1996	3.1
21	9	"Diary of a Mad Rich Wife"	Richard Lang	James Stanley & Diane Messina Stanley	November 11, 1996	2.6
22	10	"Good Golly, Aunt Lottie"	Stefan Scaini	James Stanley & Dianne Messina Stanley & Lynn Marie Latham	November 18, 1996	3.0
23	11	"The Battle of Midway"	James Darren	Lynn Marie Latham & James Stanley	November 25, 1996	3.5
24	12	"Never Too Late"	Richard Denault	Bernard Lechowick	December 2, 1996	3.5
25	13	"True Love Never Dies"	James Darren	Bernard Lechowick	December 9, 1996	3.0
26	14	"Get Me to the Church on Time"	Mark Jean	Dianne Messina Stanley	December 16, 1996	3.0
27	15	"Dressed to Shill"	Parker Stevenson	Greg Elliot & Michael Perricone	January 6, 1997	3.01
28	16	"Every Picture Tells a Story"	Les Sheldon	Constance M. Burge & Dianne Messina Stanley & James Stanley	January 13, 1997	2.60
29	17	"The Morning After"	Eleanore Lindo	Constance M. Burge & Diane Messina Stanley & James Stanley	January 20, 1997	2.68
30	18	"The Gal to Marry Dear Old Dad"	Harvey Laidman	Constance M. Burge & Diane Messina Stanley & James Stanley	February 3, 1997	2.60
31	19	"Code Blue"	Richard Lang	Diane Messina Stanley & James Stanley	February 10, 1997	2.65
32	20	"Where There's a Will..."	James Darren	Peter Dunne	February 17, 1997	2.57
33	21	"Oh No, Mr. Bill"	Richard Denault	Constance M. Burge	February 24, 1997	3.16
34	22	"I Don't"	Eleanore Lindo	Constance M. Burge & James Stanley	February 24, 1997	3.16

== Development ==
Savannah was the first drama series produced for The WB, which had been launched in January 1995 and featured primarily sitcoms. Garth Ancier, president of the WB's entertainment division, said, "We believe there's a tremendous opportunity to attract female viewers with a one-hour drama opposite the networks' three competing two-hour movies, much the way Fox has attracted a male-oriented audience with its one-hour comedy block ... on Sunday nights."

Executive producer Aaron Spelling called Savannah "a young Dynasty", referring the 1980s prime time soap also produced by Spelling, as well as "a little touch of Gone with the Wind if it were done in 1996."

The series focuses on three young women who share a life long friendship but as adults have little in common. Reese Burton is described as a "rich and pampered", yet naive, woman "who remains unselfish despite her wealth and privilege." Lane MacKenzie is perky and levelheaded, and "remains loyal to her friends despite a run of bad luck." Peyton Richards is the "bad girl", and a "street-wise" woman who is jealous of Reese's wealth and pending marriage, and whose "impetuous nature seems certain to test the bonds of friendship—especially when she goes after her friend Reese's fiancé [Travis]." Travis, who turns out to be "the nastiest guy this side of J. R. Ewing", is also "the most multifaceted liar in the world" while pretending to be nice. The Deseret News notes that Reese's father [Edward] "loves his daughter very, very much but has a secret"; the mysterious [Tom] "falls in love with Reese very, very much but has a secret"; [and] upright cop [Dean] "really loves Lane from point one, but he has two secrets".

== Locations and filming ==
The show was filmed entirely on location in the U.S. state of Georgia. Initially, exterior scenes were shot in both Savannah and Atlanta, Georgia. Locations and landmarks featured included the Eugene Talmadge Memorial Bridge, Forsyth Park, River Street, and Bonaventure Cemetery. Towards the end of season two, scenes were no longer filmed at the exterior locations for many of the show's main sets. These were replaced by stock establishing-shot footage and scenes were filmed entirely in Atlanta.

== Broadcast history ==
Savannah's first season was broadcast between January 21, 1996 and April 7, 1996. The first two episodes were shown together as a two-hour Saturday "sneak preview" of the upcoming series. The remaining season one episodes were shown on Sunday nights. The show was the most successful program on The WB at the time, and by April 1996 had been renewed for a second season.

During its second season, Savannah was moved to Monday nights, the 22 second season episodes broadcast between August 26, 1996 and February 24, 1997 at 9:00 pm following 7th Heaven. It was cancelled at the end of the season. Ancier noted that the show had "a rough season creatively", and attributed its cancellation to the fact that "serial dramas don't repeat well, making the investment too expensive". Its mid season replacement would be the eventual cult hit Buffy the Vampire Slayer.

The first season was broadcast in the United Kingdom on 28 June 1996 on ITV in a prime time slot and became the highest rated new American series of that year. However, the second season was not network broadcast, and was shown in different ITV regions at different times in the late 1990s; for instance, it was not broadcast in the Central region until May 1999.

== Reception ==
Scott D. Pierce of the Deseret News wrote of the Savannah premiere that "in an era where prime-time soaps have become campy and downright stupid, this new serial is sort of classy. In a trashy kind of way." Pierce also described the show as "lush, lusty and lively ... We're not talking brain food here, but it does look like rather tasty junk food", and credited writers Jim Stanley and Diane Messina Stanley for making Savannah "a cut above Spelling's other prime-time soaps, Melrose Place and Beverly Hills, 90210."
