= Diane Messina Stanley =

American television writer and producer (born 1946)

Diane Messina Stanley (born 1946) is an American television writer and producer.

== Positions held ==
Strong Medicine, Judging Amy, Knots Landing, The Young and the Restless (Breakdown Writer), Harper Valley P.T.A., House Calls, That's Life, Savannah, Homefront, Early Edition, Pacific Palisades, Army Wives, and Road To Avonlea. She also developed Spyder Games with her husband, James Stanley.

== Awards and nominations ==
- Primetime Emmy Award: Outstanding Drama Series (Homefront, 1993) (nomination shared with Lynn Marie Latham, Bernard Lechowick, David Jacobs, Christopher Chulack, and her husband)
- Imagen Foundation Awards: Best Primetime TV Series (Second Chances, 1993)
- Viewers For Quality Television Awards (Homefront, 1991)
- Sentinel for Health Award (Army Wives, 2010, with writing staff)
- Donate Life Inspire Award (Army Wives, 2010, with writing staff)
