= Live Through This (TV series) =

- Created by: Karen Krenis; Brian Strause; Bernard Lechowick
- Starring: Matthew Carey; Sarah Manninen; Bruce Dinsmore
- Composer: Spencer Proffer
- Country of origin: United States
- Original language: English
- No. of seasons: 1
- No. of episodes: 13

Production
- Executive producers: Bernard Lechowick; Paul Painter; Robin Spry; Michael Yudin
- Running time: 60 minutes
- Production company: Telescene Film Group

Original release
- Network: MTV
- Release: August 9, 2000 – March 8, 2001

Live Through This is a teen drama series that aired on MTV during the 2000–2001 season, though cancelled after only 13 episodes due to poor ratings. The hour-long drama plot involved a fictional 1980s band entitled "The Jackson Decker Band" reuniting for one last comeback tour. Each episode featured original music written by Graham Nash and performed by Pat Benatar. It was the first hour-long drama series to be aired on MTV.

== Cast ==
- Matthew Carey as Travis Williams
- Tom Lock as Chase Rooney
- Sarah Manninen as Tallulah "Lu" Baker
- Jane McGregor as Darby Parsons
- Jessica Welch as Olivia Rooney
- Bruce Dinsmore as Rick Parsons
- Ron Lea as Drake Taylor
- David Nerman as Keith Rooney
- Jennifer Dale as Annie Baker

== Episodes ==
No.	Title	Directed by	Written by	Original release date
1	"Episode 1"	John L'Ecuyer	Story by : Karen Krenis & Brian Strause; Teleplay by : George Huang & Bernard Lechowick	August 9, 2000
2	"Episode 2"	Unknown	Julie Stuppler Dufine & Amanda Rudolph Schwartz	August 16, 2000
3	"Episode 3"	Unknown	James Stanley	August 23, 2000
4	"Episode 4"	Unknown	Joseph Dougherty	August 30, 2000
5	"Episode 5"	Unknown	Terri Treas & Michael Zand	September 6, 2000
6	"Episode 6"	Unknown	David A. Levinson	September 13, 2000
7	"Episode 7"	Unknown	Linda Gase	September 20, 2000
8	"Episode 8"	Unknown	Linda Gase & Bernard Lechowick	October 31, 2000
9	"Episode 9"	Unknown	Linda Gase & Bernard Lechowick	November 9, 2000
10	"Episode 10"	Unknown	James Stanley	November 16, 2000
11	"Episode 11"	Unknown	Linda Gase	February 22, 2001
12	"Episode 12"	Unknown	David A. Levinson	March 1, 2001
13	"Episode 13"	Unknown	Bernard Lechowick	March 8, 2001
