= Pacific Palisades (TV series) =

Primetime American soap opera

- Main cast
- Genre: Soap opera
- Created by: Diane Messina Stanley; James Stanley
- Written by: Heather Conkie; Peter Dunne; Joel J. Feigenbaum; Carla Kettner; Lynn Marie Latham; Diane Messina Stanley; James Stanley
- Directed by: Gabrielle Beaumont; Chip Chalmers; Mel Damski; Richard Denault; Les Landau; Richard Lang; Eleanor Lindo; Charles Pratt Jr.; David Semel; Les Sheldon; James Whitmore Jr.
- Theme music composer: Dan Foliart
- Opening theme: "Pacific Palisades"
- Composer: Tim Truman
- Country of origin: United States
- Original language: English
- No. of seasons: 1
- No. of episodes: 13

Production
- Executive producers: Aaron Spelling; Diane Messina Stanley; James Stanley; E. Duke Vincent
- Editors: Derek Berlatsky; Bob Bring; Mitchell Danton
- Camera setup: Multi-camera
- Running time: 45 minutes
- Production company: Spelling Television

Original release
- Network: Fox
- Release: April 9 – July 30, 1997

Pacific Palisades is an American soap opera that aired on Fox during prime time from April to July 1997. Produced by Aaron Spelling, the show was canceled after thirteen episodes despite a last-minute attempt to increase ratings by casting Joan Collins as Laura's mother.

The show was originally supposed to be a vehicle for Erika Eleniak. She was due to play the Laura Sinclair role, but turned it down due to the racy scene where the character described as "an aggressive real estate agent" seduces a client to secure an offer. The scene was eventually toned down, with Eleniak still passing, and eventually Kimberley Davies was cast.

== Summary ==
Set in the Los Angeles district of the same name, the series follows the lives of young professionals who have it all, but haven't paid for it yet, on the Southern California fast track to fame, fortune, scandal and ruin.

The cast of characters includes Joanna (Michelle Stafford) and Nick Hadley (Jarrod Emick), a young married couple who left their native Midwest for the Pacific Coast where Nick has landed a job as an architect; Joanna's troubled teenage sister Rachel Whittaker (Natalia Cigliuti) – later discovered to be her illegitimate daughter at the end of the series; Rachel's friends Ashley (Jennifer Banko) and Michael (J. Trevor Edmond) who excel in sneakiness; Robert (Greg Evigan) and Kate Russo (Finola Hughes), whose sterling life is beginning to tarnish; Jessica Mitchell (Jocelyn Seagrave), a rising professional whose choice of men leads to trouble; Matt Dunning (Lucky Vanous), a construction businessman with a dark side; Laura Sinclair (Kimberley Davies), a real estate agent who does whatever it takes to close a deal; Cory Robbins (Joel Wyner and then Dylan Neal), a promising but manipulative plastic surgeon; and beautiful Beth Hooper (Brittney Powell), who rents an apartment from Laura and is being romanced by Cory.

== Cast ==
=== Main ===
- Natalia Cigliuti as Rachel Whittaker
- Kimberley Davies as Laura Sinclair
- Trevor Edmond as Michael Kerris (episode 7–13, recurring episodes 1–6)
- Jarrod Emick as Nick Hadley
- Greg Evigan as Robert Russo
- Finola Hughes as Kate Russo
- Dylan Neal as Cory Robbins #2 (episode 7–13)
- Brittney Powell as Beth Hooper
- Jocelyn Seagrave as Jessica Mitchell
- Michelle Stafford as Joanna Hadley
- Lucky Vanous as Matt Dunning
- Joel Wyner as Cory Robbins #1 (episodes 1–6)
- Joan Collins as Christina Hobson (episodes 4–6, 10–13, credited as "special guest star")

=== Recurring ===
- Gianni Russo as Frank Nichols
- Paul Satterfield as John Graham
- Daphne Ashbrook as Julie Graham

=== Guests ===
- Antoinette Byron as Hobson's daughter (1 episode)
- Daniel Dae Kim as Kate's Attorney (1 episode)
- Linda Cardellini as Sarah (2 episodes)

== Episodes ==
No.	Title	Directed by	Written by	Original release date
1	"Welcome to the Neighborhood"	Richard Lang	Diane Messina Stanley & James Stanley	April 9, 1997
2	"The Bet"	Eleanore Lindo	Joel J. Feigenbaum	April 16, 1997
3	"The Other Woman"	David Semel	Diane Messina Stanley	April 23, 1997
4	"All Hell Breaks Loose"	Chip Chalmers	Heather Conkie	April 30, 1997
5	"Mothers and Other Strangers"	Les Sheldon	Carla Kettner	May 7, 1997
6	"Runaway"	James Whitmore, Jr.	James Stanley	June 11, 1997
7	"Past & Present Danger"	David Semel	Heather Conkie	June 18, 1997
8	"Desperate Measure"	Richard Denault	Joel J. Feigenbaum	June 25, 1997
9	"Best Laid Plans"	Gabrielle Beaumont	Lynn Marie Latham	July 2, 1997
10	"Private Showing"	Les Sheldon	Diane Messina Stanley	July 9, 1997
11	"Motherly Love"	Mel Damski	Lynn Marie Latham	July 16, 1997
12	"Sweet Revenge"	David Semel	James Stanley	July 23, 1997
13	"End Game"	Les Sheldon	Peter Dunne	July 30, 1997
