= Bernard Lechowick =

American television writer and producer

Bernard Lechowick is an American television writer and producer. He grew up in Mentor, Ohio and is a father of two sons, Richard Latham Lechowick and Vincent Latham Lechowick. Lechowick graduated from the University of Notre Dame. Lechowick obtained his master’s degree in Radio, Television, and Film at the University of Texas at Austin, where he met his wife, Lynn Marie Latham.

He began his writing partnership with his wife, L. M. Latham, in 1979. In 1984, their primetime serial, Berrenger's, aired on NBC. When the show was cancelled after a few months on the air, Lechowick received job offers to write for Dallas, Knots Landing and Falcon Crest. He and his wife ultimately opted for the Knots Landing offer.

== Positions held ==
- The Young and the Restless: Creative Consultant (May 2, 2007 – December 24, 2007); Breakdown Writer (May 2, 2007 – December 19, 2007); Script Writer (August 28, 2006 – December 18, 2006; May 14, 2007 – December 2007)
- Wild Card (Co-Creator, Writer, Executive Producer)
- Live Through This (Executive Producer)
- That's Life (Consulting Producer)
- Hyperion Bay (Co-Executive Producer)
- Savannah (Writer)
- Hotel Malibu (Co-Creator, Writer, Executive Producer)
- Second Chances (Co-Creator, Writer, Executive Producer)
- Homefront (Co-Creator, Writer, Executive Producer) (Homefront was inducted into The Museum of Television & Radio in March 1998)
- Wolf Lake (Executive Producer)
- Knots Landing (Writer, Producer)
- Berrenger's (Story editor)
- Mama Malone (Script Writer)
- Brilliant But Cancelled: The Perfect Pitch
- Que Pasa, U.S.A.? (Director)

== Awards and nominations ==
Lechowick has been nominated for 3 Primetime Emmy Awards, 2 Daytime Emmys, 2 Writers Guild of America Award, 1 Viewers for Quality Television Awards, and 1 Imagen Foundation Awards.
