= Wild Card (TV series) =

Canadian-American comedy-drama series

- Also known as: Zoe Busiek: Wild Card
- Genre: Comedy drama
- Created by: Lynn Marie Latham; Bernard Lechowick
- Starring: Joely Fisher; Chris Potter; Vikki Krinsky; Aislinn Paul; Jamie Johnston
- Countries of origin: Canada; United States
- Original language: English
- No. of seasons: 2
- No. of episodes: 36

Production
- Executive producers: Lynn Marie Latham; Bernard Lechowick; Douglas Steinberg
- Camera setup: Single-camera
- Running time: 45–48 minutes
- Production companies: Fireworks Entertainment; Lifetime Productions

Original release
- Network: Lifetime (United States); Global Television Network (Canada)
- Release: August 2, 2003 – July 16, 2005

Wild Card (also known as Zoe Busiek: Wild Card) is a Canadian-American comedy-drama series starring Joely Fisher. It was broadcast in the United States on Lifetime, and on the Global Television Network in Canada from August 2003 to July 2005.

== Synopsis ==
Zoe Busiek is a former Las Vegas blackjack dealer whose life takes an unexpected turn when her sister Susan dies in a hit-and-run and she has to take care of her sister's three children, Taylor, Cliff, and Hannah. When the insurance company denies the family a financial settlement Zoe takes matters into her own hands, which leads her to a new career as an insurance fraud investigator with handsome former criminal Dan Lennox and serious but sweet Sophia Mason becoming her partners.

Each episode is centered on a particular case as well as Zoe's family life. She uses her skills at reading people and deduction as a newly-hired insurance fraud investigator. Sophia later becomes the boss. She leaves the show in the second season, along with Marcos, and is replaced by M. Pearl McGuire, who becomes Zoe's and Dan's new boss.

== Cast ==
=== Main ===
- Joely Fisher as Zoe Busiek
- Chris Potter as Dan Lennox
- Bronson Picket as Marcos Morales (season 1)
- Vikki Krinsky as Taylor Woodall
- Devin Douglas Drewitz (pilot) & Jamie Johnston as Clifford "Cliff" Woodall
- Aislinn Paul as Hannah Woodall
- Rae Dawn Chong as Sophia Mason (season 1)
- Loretta Devine as M. (Matilda) Pearl McGuire (season 2)

=== Recurring ===
- Corey Sevier as Julian
- Yani Gellman as Ryder
- Joe Pingue as Leo Lombardi

== Production notes ==
The series, which is set in Chicago, Illinois (filmed in Toronto), was created and executive produced by Lynn Marie Latham and Bernard Lechowick. The theme song for the first season is performed by Amy Sky, while the theme song for the second season, "I Believe In Me," is performed by Cherie.

=== Main crew ===
Lynn Marie Latham, Bernard Lechowick, Linda Gase, and Thania St. John. Latham and Lechowick were fired as showrunners by the end of the first season, replaced by Doug Steinberg (formerly a consultant on Dawson's Creek).

== Episodes ==
=== Series overview ===
Season	Episodes	Originally released	
Season	Episodes	First released	Last released
1	18	August 2, 2003	January 24, 2004
2	18	July 11, 2004	July 16, 2005

=== Season 1 (2003–04) ===
No. overall	No. in season	Title	Directed by	Written by	Original release date
1	1	"Pilot"	Stephen Surjik	Lynn Marie Latham & Bernard Lechowick & Steve Blackman	August 2, 2003
Zoe Busiek is a free spirited woman originally from Chicago who lives in Las Vegas. When she learns her sister died in an accident, she goes back to take care of her children. She then learns that the insurance company decides not to pay because eye witness account claims her sister was at fault. But Zoe doesn't believe she was so she sets out to prove it.
2	2	"The Learning Curve"	Steve Blackman	Steve Blackman	August 9, 2003
A woman's house is set on fire for trying to help out the community, so Zoe and Dan go and interview a 12-year-old boy named Jimmy who knew the woman that was killed. Sophia has trouble with her boyfriend. Hannah tries to protest for a crossing guard at her school that lives in her car.
3	3	"Con Artistry"	Andrew Potter	Steve Blackman	August 16, 2003
Zoe finds out her partner, Dan, used to be engaged and used to be a thief. Meanwhile Dan's ex-fiancé; comes to town. Marcos asks Zoe out on a date, but she turns him down the first time. Sophia and her boyfriend try to find a house, but have differences tastes in a place to live. Dan discovers he has feelings for Zoe and goes to tell her, but when he does he sees Zoe and Marcos kissing on the porch.
4	4	"Hell Week"	Steve Blackman	Steve Blackman & Marla Kanelos	August 23, 2003
A drunken young woman falls into a coma after being mauled in a lion enclosure. The zoo sues the girl for trespass. Zoe's and Sophie's investigation takes them to a university sorority where the girl was a pledge. Zoe tries to sort out her feelings for Marcos, a visitor from her past comes and surprises her.
5	5	"Dearly Beloved"	Steve Blackman	Steve Blackman	September 6, 2003
A country club wedding that was ruined by errant lawn sprinklers.
6	6	"Dead Again"	Steve Blackman	Steve Blackman	September 13, 2003
A man falls overboard from a yacht. His beneficiaries collect the insurance. Zoe investigates when the drowned man dies a second time, 2 years later. Dan tries to prove the innocence of the man's partner who is in prison for embezzlement.
7	7	"The Cheese Stands Alone"	Jeremy Podeswa	Steve Blackman	September 27, 2003
The database of an upscale matchmaking service is destroyed.
8	8	"No Bull"	Sturla Gunnarsson	Steve Blackman	October 4, 2003
Sophia stays behind to investigate a jewel theft, while Zoe and Dan are sent out of the city to investigate the health of a bull.
9	9	"Mimi's Assetts"	Steve Blackman	Steve Blackman & Marla Kanelos	October 18, 2003
When a fog machine explodes and kills a stripper, Dan and Zoe go undercover in that strip-joint to gather clues and find out who was responsible. Dan gets fired quickly, but Zoe soldiers on.
10	10	"Spooked"	Steve Blackman	Steve Blackman	October 25, 2003
Zoe and Dan investigate a case of vandalism; Zoe deals with her niece's and nephew's Halloween antics.
11	11	"Sand Trap"	Andrew Potter	Steve Blackman	November 8, 2003
Zoe and Dan investigate the death of a celebrity who may have changed her will to indicate she wanted to be cryogenically frozen.
12	12	"Black Sheep"	Steve Blackman	Steve Blackman	November 15, 2003
Zoe and Dan investigate the circumstances of a large auto insurance claim.
13	13	"Bullet Proof"	Steve Blackman	Steve Blackman	December 6, 2003
Zoe is shot when she interrupts a burglary in progress.
14	14	"Backstabbed"	John Bell	Steve Blackman	December 13, 2003
Zoe goes undercover as a reality-TV contestant in order to investigate a murder.
15	15	"Auntie Venom"	Steve Blackman	Steve Blackman	January 3, 2004
After a woman is fatally bitten by a poisonous Australian snake on a cruise, the insurance investigation team's suspects include her ex, the biologist who presents the TV show "Nigel au Naturel", and a rivalling cruise company which earlier just managed to keep a lizard incident from public knowledge. So Daniel goes on their next singles cruise, where Nigel Hampton also has booked carrying a ferret and a pet snake, as passenger and Zoe fills in for the sick singer. Meanwhile, the kids shoot a jealous murder play at home.
16	16	"Block Party"	Andrew Potter	Steve Blackman & Marla Kanelos	January 10, 2004
When Victoria Motetti gets killed in her nice neighbourhood, the police suspects the Robin Hoods burglary gang, but their usual pickings were not robbed, just art. When Dan and Zoe investigate, it turns out that Victoria's lover, handyman Trey, a surfer who travels around the Pacific and has access to several robbed houses, paid all his hefty debts shortly after the burglary, and a robbed bracelet falls out of his car; but the plot thickens... Meanwhile, Zoe tries to separate Taylor from Ryder at least some time by 'creating' a filing job for her at the office.
17	17	"Candy Land"	Steve Blackman	Steve Blackman & Marla Kanelos	January 17, 2004
In this winter wonder episode, Dan enjoys investigating the Karmakazi-snowboard scene, where sabotage of fuel tanks upset everything, at the side of model Candace 'Candy' LaRue; the hotel owner, who might have planned this to get modern fire equipment, and his ex accuse each-other; barman Sam hates the very sport. Meanwhile Zoe -who turns out Candy's former best friend- takes her nieces -whose minds and phones remain home-focused- on a 'working parent guilt' ski trip to the same Dells. Candy gets Zoe's blessing to go for Dan, while Zoe's lover Marcos turns up after his volleyball tournament was cancelled. They suspect Josh Dickens who has his own physiotherapist and would have lost the sponsorship without the delay but has an alibi. Julian finds out that Ryder has returned to Columbus without even telling Taylor.
18	18	"Queen Bea"	Steve Blackman	Steve Blackman	January 24, 2004
Wild gal pal Candy tags along with Zoe and her family back to Chicago.

=== Season 2 (2004–05) ===
No. overall	No. in season	Title	Original release date
19	1	"A Felony for Melanie"	July 11, 2004
20	2	"Dr. Sidney Loses a Kidney"	July 18, 2004
21	3	"Sniper Shot, Intern Hot"	July 25, 2004
22	4	"Roses Are Red, Violets Are Busiek"	August 1, 2004
23	5	"Bound and Gagged, Your Husband Was Snagged"	August 8, 2004
24	6	"Wham Bam, Thank You Dan"	August 15, 2004
25	7	"Slam Dunk Funk"	August 22, 2004
26	8	"Die, Die, Who Am I?"	September 26, 2004
27	9	"Premonition Mission"	October 3, 2004
28	10	"Bada Bing, Bada Busiek"	October 10, 2004
29	11	"Tick Tock, Writer's Block"	October 17, 2004
30	12	"Blind in a Bind"	October 24, 2004
31	13	"Russian Missus Gets No Kisses"	June 11, 2005
32	14	"See Ya Later, Investigator!"	June 18, 2005
33	15	"A Whisper from Zoe's Sister"	June 25, 2005
34	16	"Multiple Personality Fatality"	July 2, 2005
35	17	"My Boyfriend Is an Axe Murderer"	July 9, 2005
36	18	"Zoe's Phony Matrimony"	July 16, 2005

== Syndication ==
The series was aired in syndication on the Lifetime Real Women network.
