= Second Chances (American TV series) =

American drama television series

- Genre: Drama; Soap opera
- Created by: Lynn Marie Latham; Bernard Lechowick
- Starring: Connie Sellecca; Matt Salinger
- Composer: Mark Mothersbaugh
- Country of origin: United States
- Original language: English
- No. of seasons: 1
- No. of episodes: 10

Production
- Executive producers: Lynn Marie Latham; Bernard Lechowick
- Production location: Valencia, California
- Running time: 45 minutes
- Production companies: ITC Entertainment; Latham-Lechowick Productions

Original release
- Network: CBS
- Release: December 2, 1993 – February 10, 1994

Second Chances is an American drama television series created and written by producers Bernard Lechowick and Lynn Marie Latham. The two-hour pilot episode was directed by Sharron Miller. Its cast includes Connie Sellecca, Matt Salinger, Megan Follows, Jennifer Lopez, and Michelle Phillips. The series premiered December 2, 1993, on CBS, and aired its final episode on February 19, 1994. Hotel Malibu, which was touted as a spinoff of this series, debuted in August 1994.

This series marked a reunion between actors Ronny Cox and Frances Lee McCain who had worked together two decades before on another CBS series called Apple's Way.

== Cast ==
- Connie Sellecca as Dianne Benedict, attorney and aspiring judge
- Matt Salinger as Mike Chulack, Dianne's ex-boyfriend and ex-con
- Ronny Cox as George Cook, Kevin's father
- Megan Porter Follows as Kate Benedict, Dianne's younger sister
- Justin Lazard as Kevin Cook, law student
- Jennifer Lopez as Melinda Lopez, college student, engaged to Kevin
- Francis Lee McCain as Felicity Cook, Kevin's mother
- Michelle Phillips as Joanna Russel, secretary and mistress of Dianne's husband
- Pepe Serna as Salvador Lopez, Melinda's father
- Ray Wise as Judge Jim Stinson, corrupt judge
- Ramy Zada as Detective Jerry Kuntz, investigating the murder of Dianne's husband

== Episodes ==
No.	Title	Directed by	Original release date
1–2	"Save the Last Dance for Me"	Sharron Miller	December 2, 1993
Note: Aired as a two-hour premiere episode.
3	"Coincidence or Conspiracy"	Joseph L. Scanlan	December 9, 1993
4	"Living in Between"	Sharron Miller	December 16, 1993
5	"I Can't Get No Satisfaxion"	Nicholas Sgarro	December 23, 1993
6	"Swimming Through Mud"	Sharron Miller	January 6, 1994
7	"If the Truth Be Told"	Gene Reynolds	January 13, 1994
8	"Down Looks Like Up"	Jack Fisk	January 20, 1994
9	"Miss Friendly Santa Rita"	Stefan Scaini	January 27, 1994
10	"Justifiable Jealousy"	Gene Reynolds	February 10, 1994

== Production ==
On January 17, 1994, the Northridge earthquake damaged the show's sets, and CBS decided to cancel the series instead of investing money to repair them – in addition to the cost of rebuilding, both Connie Sellecca and Megan Follows were pregnant and would have been far along by the time the sets were rebuilt. The series' last episode ran on February 10, 1994, as part of CBS's "Crimetime After Primetime" lineup. Part of the cast and characters were moved to the summertime replacement show Hotel Malibu in August 1994, which was touted as a spinoff of the series.

== Reception ==
Ken Tucker of Entertainment Weekly rated the pilot episode a C− saying that it "relies on too many verbal cliches and pat coincidences to promise much in the way of engrossing escapism". Tony Scott of Variety stated that the series "needs more riveting material" as the pilot episode "suffers from blatant, uninvolving characters, low-caliber plotting and subcommercial appeal".
