= Early Edition =

American TV drama series (1996–2000)

- Genre: Adventure; Fantasy; Comedy drama
- Created by: Ian Abrams; Patrick Q. Page; Vik Rubenfeld
- Developed by: Bob Brush
- Starring: Kyle Chandler; Shanésia Davis-Williams; Fisher Stevens; Kristy Swanson; Billie Worley
- Narrated by: Kyle Chandler; Fisher Stevens
- Theme music composer: W. G. Snuffy Walden
- Country of origin: United States
- Original language: English
- No. of seasons: 4
- No. of episodes: 90 (list of episodes)

Production
- Executive producer: Bob Brush
- Running time: 45–48 minutes
- Production companies: Three Characters Productions; (1996–1998; seasons 1–2); Angelica Films; (1996–1998; seasons 1–2); CBS Productions; TriStar Television; (1996–1997; season 1); Columbia TriStar Television; (1997–2000; seasons 2–4)

Original release
- Network: CBS
- Release: September 28, 1996 – May 27, 2000

Early Edition is an American fantasy comedy-drama television series that aired on CBS from September 28, 1996, to May 27, 2000. Set in Chicago, Illinois, it follows the adventures of a man who mysteriously receives each Chicago Sun-Times newspaper the day before it is actually published, and who uses this knowledge to prevent terrible events every day. Created by Ian Abrams, Patrick Q. Page, and Vik Rubenfeld, the series starred actor Kyle Chandler as Gary Hobson, and it featured many real Chicago locations over the course of the series' run.

The show was canceled on May 27, 2000, after 90 episodes were made, and it began airing in syndication on Fox Family Channel that same month. Fan conventions about the show were held for multiple years. CBS Home Entertainment released the first two seasons on the DVD format in the United States in 2008 and 2009. The complete series was released on DVD in 2018.

== Plot summary ==
The show chronicles the life of Gary Hobson, a resident of Chicago, Illinois, who mysteriously receives the Chicago Sun-Times newspaper a day in advance, effectively giving him knowledge of the potential future. His newspaper is delivered by a mysteriously unknown entity at least once each day, and is accompanied by a ginger tabby cat, with the first copy arriving every morning at 6:30 a.m., no matter what his physical location is. Armed with knowledge of the future, he then tries to prevent tragedies described in "tomorrow's" Sun-Times from occurring, thus changing the story text and headlines in the newspaper to reflect the outcome of his actions. Often, Gary does not wish to be saddled with the responsibility of performing these deeds. The paper presents him with many moral dilemmas where he must choose between helping different people in need of assistance.

The leading cast: Kyle Chandler, Shanésia Davis-Williams and Fisher Stevens

The first season begins by showing Gary coming home from his job as a stockbroker, only to be thrown out of the house (and later divorced) for no apparent reason by his wife Marcia. Upon taking up residence in the Blackstone Hotel, Gary begins receiving a copy of the Chicago Sun-Times, accompanied by "The Cat", every morning. Slowly, Gary realizes the paper's contents reflect events that are to happen during that day, and confers with his co-workers and friends Chuck Fishman (a former fellow stockbroker) and Marissa Clark (the blind former receptionist at the brokerage). After deciding to use his knowledge of the future only for "good," Gary is soon consumed by trying to prevent tragedies and help people, leading him to quit his job. During the season, Chuck consistently tries to use "The Paper" to make money, while Gary develops a precarious relationship with police Detective Marion Zeke Crumb. By the season's end, Gary has begun to uncover some of the mystery surrounding the paper, including confirmation that a man named Lucius Snow received the paper from the cat before him.

Season two continues Gary's adventures with the paper and his friends. Detective Crumb sometimes joins Gary, Chuck, and Marissa after retiring from the police force. Gary is working part-time at McGinty's as a bartender. Despite being closer to the paper, Crumb does not want to know how Gary gets his so-called "hunches," and never learns of the paper. At the end of season two, Chuck (Fisher Stevens) leaves the show as a regular character, leading to some major changes in season three.

Within the course of the series, Gary discovers that a few other people share his gift of receiving a prophetic newspaper. The only people who know about his gift besides Chuck and Marissa are his parents, Meredith Carson, and Erica and Henry Paget, a single mother and her son (Gary gives Erica a job at McGinty's); several times he begins to tell a few people, such as his attorney, and various police officers (Episode 407/408, "Fatal Edition"), but ultimately changes his mind. On some occasions, he is given the ability to wake up in another time (such as in the early 20th century) to change the past. People who encounter Gary often strongly suspect (or know) that he has a secret, but do not know what it is, e.g. Crumb. During the course of the series, it is never clearly stated where the paper comes from. In one episode, Gary meets the group of people apparently responsible for giving him (as well as others) the Paper. Nothing much is revealed about them except that they have some sort of supernatural abilities, such as being able to mysteriously appear at any location.

In season four, episode 20, "Time" (the series finale that aired a few episodes early), it is briefly explained why Gary started receiving the paper. Apparently, he was given the responsibility by Lucius Snow (the man who received the Chicago Sun-Times before Gary), after Snow saved Gary's life when Gary was a child. The responsibility is represented by a pocketknife imprinted with the initials of the person next to receive the paper (Lucius gave Gary the red Swiss Army knife). The initials mysteriously change every time the current person decides on a new person to receive the responsibility. At the end of the same episode, Gary passes on the same pocketknife to a young girl named Lindsey Romick who had just lost her grandfather, and it is implied that Lindsey will begin receiving the paper when Gary is no longer able to carry on the responsibilities.

== Episodes ==
Season	Episodes	Originally released	
Season	Episodes	First released	Last released
1	23	September 28, 1996	May 17, 1997
2	22	September 27, 1997	May 23, 1998
3	23	September 26, 1998	May 15, 1999
4	22	September 25, 1999	May 27, 2000

== Cast and characters ==
=== Main ===
- Kyle Chandler as Gary Hobson
- Shanésia Davis-Williams as Marissa Clark
- Fisher Stevens as Chuck Fishman (seasons 1–2; guest, seasons 3–4)
- Panther, Pella, and Carl as The Cat
- Kristy Swanson as Erica Paget (season 3)
- Myles Jeffrey as Henry Paget (season 3)
- Billie Worley as Patrick Quinn (seasons 3–4)

=== Recurring ===
- Ron Dean as Detective Marion Zeke Crumb
- William Devane as Bernie Hobson, Gary's father
- Tess Harper as Lois Hobson, Gary's mother
- Constance Marie as Detective Toni Brigatti
- Luis Antonio Ramos as Miguel Diaz
- Michael Whaley as Detective Paul Armstrong
- Fyvush Finkel as Phil Kazakian

=== Supporting characters ===
Chuck was a foil to Gary, being a somewhat cynical, wisecracking realist in contrast to Gary's growing idealism. In early episodes, Chuck seeks to parlay the advance knowledge provided by the newspaper into windfall profits (e.g., sports betting and stock-market 'insider trading'). Over time, however, he begins to take a role in helping and backing up Gary as a problem-solver.

Marissa often was the voice of reasonable conscience, balancing Gary's earnest idealism against Chuck's skeptical realism. Chuck also did the voice over narration at the opening and closing scenes of the episodes in season one, but this role was reduced during season two. Instead a standard line was used during opening credits, and a closing narration remained in a few episodes, but as season three progressed, there was no narration for either the opening or closing scenes, and the episodes "Walk Don't Run" and "Deadline" had fictional Chicago Sun-Times columnist Molly Greene do the closing narration as part of her column.

Stevens's departure from the show after two seasons changed the dynamic of the show. His voice-over narration was shifted to at first Gary and then Marissa in season three. This was eventually done away with, the theme music was changed, and there began a revolving door of foils for Gary, including Patrick Quinn (Billie Worley) and Erica Paget (Kristy Swanson). The latter had a romantic subplot with Gary. Stevens made several guest appearances on the show after leaving, and several of the characters stayed (such as the hard-boiled detective Crumb, and Gary's bartender Patrick).

=== Guest stars ===
During the series' run, Early Edition also featured many notable guest stars from television, feature films, and other entertainment industries.

Notable TV actors who appeared include Anna Chlumsky, Fyvush Finkel, Felicity Huffman, Ken Jenkins, Jane Krakowski, Laura Leighton, Robert Duncan McNeil, Cynthia Nixon, Pauley Perrette, Robert Picardo and Michael Shannon.

Academy Award winner Louis Gossett, Jr had a major role in the season two episode "The Medal".

Former Chicago Sun-Times publisher David Radler appeared several times as the publisher of the Sun-Times, the newspaper that was delivered to Gary, while film critic Roger Ebert made a cameo as himself. Other cameos include Tara Lipinski, Coolio, Tone Loc, Dick Butkus, Pat O'Brien, and Martina McBride.

There was a season two cross-over with Chicago Hope with Héctor Elizondo, Jayne Brook and Rocky Carroll playing their characters from that show. Also during season three, CBS used an Early Edition episode as a promotional vehicle for the network's Martial Law TV series starring martial arts expert Sammo Hung. In the fourth and final season, professional wrestlers Tommy Dreamer and New Jack guest starred in the episode "Mel Schwartz, Bounty Hunter". A season two episode ended with a colorized clip of Rod Serling informing viewers they had just watched a tale from The Twilight Zone.

== Production ==
=== Conception ===
The origin of Early Edition stems from a collaborative idea between writers Vik Rubenfeld and Pat Page. After meeting each other while playing volleyball in Manhattan Beach, California, the pair began discussing ideas for feature films. While talking on the phone one day, they each contributed key parts for the idea of Early Edition. Rubenfeld believed the idea was more suited to television than a feature film, noting that, "it was a really unique way to put a character in physical jeopardy each week." The duo proceeded to write a document that described the show's characters and setting, and treatments for the first twelve episodes (a document known as a show's "bible" in the TV industry). In the process they also created a detailed treatment for the pilot episode, which entitled them to "Story By" credit when the Pilot later aired.

Despite their idea, Rubenfeld and Page still faced the daunting task of finding a way to get the show on network television with limited television production and writing experience between them. Rubenfeld decided to pitch the show to Ian Abrams, who he knew through a group called the Professional Authors Group Enterprise (PAGE). Over lunch at RJ's restaurant in Los Angeles, Rubenfeld and Page pitched the idea of "a guy who gets tomorrow's newspaper today." With Abrams's help, they decided to try to convince Tristar to pick up the show, and went about adding a few ground rules for the story, such as having the paper always accompanied by a mysterious cat. In an effort to rouse Tristar's interest in the show during their pitch meeting scheduled for August 24, 1995, Abrams had a mock newspaper created with the headline "Let's just let it end. O. J. Simpson confesses he is guilty of homicide." The catch to the mock newspaper was that it was dated the next day, August 25, 1995. After presenting the fake newspaper during the pitch meeting, a very lively conversation ensued, until someone realized the paper was dated the following day. Early Edition was green-lighted not long after.

Since its debut, the plot of Early Edition has been compared to other intellectual properties with similar themes. In particular, the 1944 feature film It Happened Tomorrow centered upon a newspaper reporter who received a newspaper a day in advance. However, Early Edition's creators claim that Early Edition is in no way based on this film.

=== Filming locations ===
The series was filmed in Chicago and many nearby towns in Illinois and Indiana, with interior sets filmed on the Early Edition Sound Stage at Studio City in Chicago. Many famous Chicago locations are seen throughout the series, such as Navy Pier in the season three episode "Play it Again, Sammo." The building used for exterior shots of McGinty's bar, a location of central importance to the series, was formerly used by the Chicago Fire Department, and is located at the northeast corner of the intersection of Franklin Street and West Illinois Street in downtown Chicago. Additionally, Hobson lived in the Blackstone Hotel during the show's first season.

=== Music ===
In the opening credits of each episode, the credit for composing Early Edition's title theme music is given to W.G. Snuffy Walden, who later wrote the theme song to another hit TV show starring Kyle Chandler, Friday Night Lights. During Early Edition's original broadcast run in the United States, an edited version of the song "Time Has Come Today" by The Chambers Brothers was used during a revamped opening title sequence from episode 403 until the series' conclusion.

== Broadcast history ==
Early Edition premiered in the United States on CBS on September 28, 1996. A total of 90 episodes were produced over the course of the show's four seasons, with the last original episode airing in the United States on May 27, 2000. Its original time slot was Saturday night at 9pm Eastern Standard Time, sandwiched between airings of Dr. Quinn, Medicine Woman and Walker, Texas Ranger. When Dr. Quinn ended in May 1998, Early Edition then began airing one hour earlier at 8 pm for the remainder of the show's run. In January and February 2000, Early Edition went on temporary hiatus as the Dick Clark game show Winning Lines aired in its time slot.

=== Ratings ===
Season	Year	Network	Viewers (in millions)	Rank
1	1996–1997	CBS	9.0 million	#49
2	1997–1998	CBS	11.9 million	#69
3	1998–1999	CBS	6.5 million	#78
4	1999–2000	CBS	8.8 million	#93

=== Cancellation ===
After May 27, 2000 (end of season 4), CBS decided to end the series' run.

=== American syndication ===
The Fox Family Channel (now Freeform) was the first entity to acquire syndication rights to Early Edition, at a price of $500,000 per episode, and the show began airing on Fox Family in May 2000. The series debuted in wider syndication in September 2000, and was aired on channels including Ion Television, FamilyNet, and GMC. From May 2012 to 2013, TVGN aired the series. From May 29, 2018, to August 28, 2018, Heroes & Icons aired the show every Tuesday for eight straight episodes starting at 12PM/11AM central time. From September 3, 2018, to October 14, 2019, Start TV ran the show in the early morning. It currently airs on Decades channel mostly on weekends.

Early Edition: The First Season

== Home media ==
CBS DVD (distributed by Paramount) released the first two seasons of Early Edition on DVD in Region 1 (American only) in 2008 and 2009.

Sony Pictures Home Entertainment owns the international DVD rights to the show, although they have not made any releases.

On August 31, 2018, Visual Entertainment released Early Edition: The Complete Collection on DVD in Region 1. The 16-disc set contains all 90 episodes including the release of seasons 3 and 4.

DVD name	Ep #	Release date
The First Season	23	June 24, 2008
The Second Season	22	July 28, 2009
The Complete Collection	90	August 31, 2018

== Reboot proposal ==
In February 2022, CBS ordered a pilot for a reboot of the original series. The project was to be a co-production between Affirm Television, Sony Pictures Television and CBS Studios, with Melissa Glenn as writer and executive producer for the pilot and DeVon Franklin as executive producer. In March 2022, it was announced that Alice Eve, Charles Michael Davis, Jay Ali and Fiona Rene were cast on the pilot. Eric Dean Seaton was to direct. However, in May 2022 CBS announced that the pilot would not be moving forward.
