= Adventure Con =

Coordinates: 35.9°N 83.9°W

- Status: Defunct
- Genre: Media/Comics
- Venue: Knoxville Expo Center (2002–2004); Knoxville Convention Center (2005–2009, 2012); Pigeon Forge Convention Center (2009–2010)
- Locations: Knoxville, Tennessee; Pigeon Forge, Tennessee
- Country: United States
- Inaugurated: 2002
- Most recent: 2012
- Organizer: Las Vegas Autographs, LLC
- Filing status: For Profit

Adventure Con was a for-profit media expo with a science fiction and comic theme held annually in Knoxville, Tennessee.

The convention was usually attended by sci-fi groups and clubs who set up booths annually, including the 501st Legion, Rebel Legion, the Dark Empire, the Knoxville Sci-Fi Club, the Tennessee Star Wars Collectors Group, and various costuming and collecting groups. In addition, the show featured a wide variety of dealers selling toys, comics, cards, and film / television memorabilia.

== History ==
Adventure Con was founded by Marcus Wollack, and was first held June 1–2, 2002, at the Knoxville Expo Center (5441 Clinton Highway, Knoxville, Tennessee). 2003 saw two shows, a late spring event and a fall event. The spring 2003 show was held at the Gatlinburg Convention Center in Gatlinburg, Tennessee. Beginning in 2005, the show moved to the Knoxville Convention Center (701 Henley Street, Knoxville, Tennessee), which features nearly 50,000 square feet of exhibitor space. The 2005 show featured two full days of gaming events and tournaments. The 2006 show featured a replica of the Back to the Future Delorean.

In 2007 Adventure Con was acquired by Las Vegas Autographs, LLC. The new owners vowed to increase the emphasis on comic books and attract 10,000 visitors. The 2007 show made national news for a Star Wars-themed wedding, which on June 2 was featured on nearly every local news broadcast in the nation that evening. The 2008 show included a special concert by Smith & Pyle, and a "birthday party" for Friday the 13th's Jason Voorhees.

In 2009, Adventure Con again featured two events, a summer and a fall show. For the fall show, Adventure Con moved to the Pigeon Forge Convention Center located at the Grand Hotel. The 2010 show, also held at the Pigeon Forge Convention Center, was half the size of the previous year, disorganized, and many dealers complained about the poor lighting.

Adventure Con 2011, the tenth anniversary show, was originally going to be held July 10–12, 2011, back in Knoxville. However, on May 6, 2011, the home page of the Adventure Con website was updated, notifying fans that the show was being pushed back to a later date. The Celebrity Guests and Comic Book Industry Guests pages were deleted. The original celebrity guests included Erika Eleniak, Tony Todd, Tara, Lee Arenberg, Valerie Perrine, Barbara Nedeljakova, Nalini Krishan, Cindy Morgan, Richard LeParmentier, and Tony Curran. There was originally no information on comic book industry guests.

The tenth anniversary show was rescheduled for October 12–13, 2012, back in Knoxville. As of June 27, 2012, it had not been specified whether the original guests would still be appearing at the show.

=== Dates and locations ===
Date	Location	Attendance	Official guests	Notes
June 1–2, 2002	Knoxville Expo Center		Yvonne Craig, Richard Kiel, Peter Mayhew, Dick Durock, Julie Newmar and Dick Warlock.	
May 31-June 1, 2003	Knoxville Expo Center		Warwick Davis, artist Steve Stanley, actor James MacArthur, actress Linda Harrison, actor Gunnar Hansen, actor Dirk Benedict, plus Buck Rogers in the 25th Century actors Gil Gerard, Erin Gray and Felix Silla.	Known as Adventure Con 2
October 3–5, 2003	Gatlinburg Convention Center		Actors Jeremy Bulloch, Dawn Wells, Yvonne Craig, Danielle Harris, and one-time James Bond actor George Lazenby.	Known as Adventure Con 2.5
June 5–6, 2004	Knoxville Expo Center	3000+	David Prowse, Anthony Daniels, Tanya Roberts, Felix Silla, Brad Dourif, Catherine Bach, Richard Hatch, Kathy Garver, Dick Durock, Jackson Bostwick and Alex Vincent. Other guests included actors from horror films, models, and professional wrestlers.	Known as Adventure Con 3
June 18–19, 2005	Knoxville Convention Center		Actors John Rhys-Davies, Robert Englund, Kenny Baker, Lou Ferrigno and Adam West.	Known as Adventure Con 4
June 24–25, 2006	Knoxville Convention Center	5000+	Guest artists: Steve Stanley, Lin Workman, and Martheus Wade. Celebrity guests: Verne Troyer, Erica Durance, Corey Feldman, Adam Baldwin, Lana Wood, Burt Ward, Hayley Mills, Clare Kramer and Ray Park.	Known as Adventure Con 5
June 1–3, 2007	Knoxville Convention Center		Guest of Honor: Ethan Van Sciver. Other guests: artist John Romita, Jr., director Nina Kaczorowski, Star Trek actors Walter Koenig and Denise Crosby, Star Wars actors Peter Mayhew, Anthony Daniels, Jeremy Bulloch and Matthew Wood, plus Brian Harnois of Sci-Fi Channel's Ghosthunters, professional wrestlers Jimmy Hart, Brutus Beefcake, Buff Bagwell and Raven, plus former University of Tennessee wide receiver Anthony Miller and many more.	
June 13–15, 2008	Knoxville Convention Center		Guest of Honor: writer and creator of X-Men character Rogue, Michael Golden. John Romita, Jr. scheduled to appear but has to cancel at the last minute. Last-minute surprise guest: Arthur Suydam of Marvel Zombies fame. Other guests: Tony Moran (Halloween), Michael Biehn (The Terminator, Aliens, and Tombstone), Doug Jones (Silver Surfer and Abe Sapien from Hellboy), Kevin Sorbo (Hercules) [Sorbo canceled at the last moment], Shawnee Smith (Saw), Missi Pyle (DodgeBall: A True Underdog Story), wrestler Roddy Piper, Kane Hodder (Friday the 13th), Ernie Hudson (Ghostbusters), Danielle Harris (Halloween), Andrew Divoff (Lost and Indiana Jones and the Kingdom of the Crystal Skull), Mitchel Musso (Hannah Montana), and many more.	
June 12–14, 2009	Knoxville Convention Center		Guest of Honor: Arthur Suydam of Marvel Zombies fame. Other guests: Ray Park (Darth Maul and Snake Eyes), Margot Kidder (Superman), William Katt (Greatest American Hero), Lou Ferrigno (The Incredible Hulk), Kane Hodder (Friday the 13th), wrestler Mick Foley, Jake Busey (Starship Troopers), America Olivo (2009 Friday the 13th), wrestling diva Christy Hemme, Todd Bridges and Gary Coleman (Diff'rent Strokes), James Dodd (Johann Kraus from Hellboy II), and many more.	Known as Adventure Con 2009—Summer
October 24–25, 2009	Pigeon Forge Convention Center located at the Grand Hotel		Guest of Honor: John Schneider (The Dukes of Hazzard). Other guests: Doug Jones (Abe Sapien and Silver Surfer), David Barclay (Yoda and Jabba the Hutt puppeteer), Derek Mears (2009 Friday the 13th), Micky Dolenz (The Monkees), William Forsythe (Rob Zombie's Halloween and Dick Tracy), wrestler Kevin Nash, Kane Hodder (Friday the 13th) and TNA Knockouts Traci Brooks and SoCal Val, plus a few more.	Known as Adventure Con 2009—Fall
May 28–30, 2010	Pigeon Forge Convention Center		Featured guest of honor: Ghost Rider co-creator Gary Friedrich. Other guests: Billy Dee Williams (Star Wars: The Empire Strikes Back and Star Wars: Return of the Jedi), James Best (Sheriff Rosco P. Coltrane from The Dukes of Hazzard), Byron Cherry (Coy Duke from The Dukes of Hazzard).	
October 13–14, 2012	Knoxville Convention Center		Guests: Kevin McNally (Pirates of the Caribbean franchise), Julian Glover, Jon Bernthal (The Walking Dead), Chris Sarandon, Ioan Gruffudd, Ian Whyte (Alien vs. Predator & Prometheus), Alan Tudyk	

== Events with similar names ==
- Adventure Con 2003 took place March 8, 2003, in Allentown, Pennsylvania.
- There was an unrelated gaming convention called AdventureCon tentatively planned for 2008 in Atlantic City, New Jersey. This event, originally scheduled for August 2007 in Las Vegas, was to celebrate the work of game designer Scott Adams and his most famous creation, Adventureland.
- There is an unrelated fantasy and science fiction games convention called Adventure Convention held each February in Hamburg, Germany. The next of these events is scheduled for March 1–3, 2013.
