= Twice Upon a Time =

Twice Upon a Time may refer to:

== Film and television ==
- Twice Upon a Time (1953 film), a British comedy film
- Twice Upon a Time (1983 film), an American animated film
- Twice Upon a Time (1998 film), an American fantasy/romantic comedy TV film
- "Twice Upon a Time" (Doctor Who), a 2017 episode of Doctor Who
- Il était une seconde fois, a French TV series released in English as Twice Upon a Time
- Twice Upon a Time..., 1979 Canadian short film

== Music ==
- Twice Upon a Time (Joe Diffie album)
- Twice Upon a Time (The Kingston Trio album)
- Twice Upon a Time – The Singles, a compilation album by Siouxsie and the Banshees

== Other uses ==
- Twice Upon a Time (book series), a children's fantasy novel series by Wendy Mass
