= List of The First Family episodes =

The First Family is an American syndicated sitcom that premiered on September 22, 2012. The series follows the 45th president of the United States William Johnson (Christopher B. Duncan), who tries to handle his duties as the leader of the United States and as a family man to his wife Katherine (Kellita Smith) and their four children, while also having to deal with the escapades of his bickering sister-in-law Pauletta (Jackée Harry) and father Alvin (John Witherspoon). The following is a list of episodes of the program.

== Series overview ==
Season	Episodes	Originally released	
Season	Episodes	First released	Last released
1	10	September 22, 2012	January 26, 2013
2	26	February 16, 2013	April 25, 2015

== Episodes ==
=== Season 1 (2012–13) ===
No. overall	No. in season	Title	Directed by	Written by	Original release date
1	1	"Pilot"	Shelley Jensen	Byron Allen & Scott Satin	September 22, 2012
President Johnson stands up to a foreign dictator at the same time his children confront a school-yard bully in the opener of this sitcom about life in the White House with a big and boisterous extended family.
2	2	"The First Report Card"	Robert Countryman	Kriss Turner	September 29, 2012
The results are in: President Johnson's favorability rating is revealed at the same time his children receive their report cards from school.
3	3	"The First Strike"	Ted Lange	Jacqueline McKinley & Antonia F. March	October 6, 2012
Pauletta leads a strike inside the White House to protest the closing of a post office.
4	4	"The First Crush"	Ted Lange	Dan Rosen	October 13, 2012
President Johnson is in the doghouse with his daughter Chloe after he reveals the boy she has a crush on to her entire class.
5	5	"The First Stay-Cation"	Ted Lange	Sy Rosen	October 20, 2012
President Johnson delays his family vacation as he tries to escape from a female foreign minister who finds him attractive.
6	6	"The First Roast"	Ted Lange	Michael Carrington	October 27, 2012
Feelings get hurt when the family take part in a mock roast to help President Johnson prepare for the annual White House Correspondents' Association Dinner.
7	7	"The First Makeover"	Ted Lange	Kriss Turner	November 3, 2012
Pauletta gives Katherine an extreme makeover.
8	8	"The First Recital"	Ted Lange	Michael Carrington	November 10, 2012
President Johnson's children find themselves having to perform in a recital after their dad exaggerates about their musical abilities.
9	9	"The First Embarrassment"	Ted Lange	Lisa Rosenthal	November 17, 2012
Pauletta and Alvin try to change their embarrassing ways by taking etiquette lessons from Bernard.
10	10	"The First Triangle"	Ted Lange	Antonia F. March & Jacqueline McKinley	January 26, 2013
Alvin's old Army buddy declares his love for Carolyn.

=== Season 2 (2013–15) ===
No. overall	No. in season	Title	Directed by	Written by	Original release date
11	1	"The First Upset"	Ted Lange	Dan Rosen	February 16, 2013
William and his arch rival have a ping pong grudge match.
12	2	"The First Tutor"	Ted Lange	Mike P. Fox & Wil Fox	February 23, 2013
13	3	"The First Shrink"	Ted Lange	Sy Rosen	March 30, 2013
14	4	"The First Date Night"	Ted Lange	Lisa Rosenthal	April 20, 2013
15	5	"The First Wedding"	Ted Lange	Jacqueline McKinley & Antonia March	April 27, 2013
16	6	"The First Driver"	Ted Lange	Michael Carrington	May 4, 2013
17	7	"The First Pitch"	Ted Lange	Dan Rosen	May 11, 2013
18	8	"The First Butler"	Ted Lange	Kriss Turner	May 18, 2013
19	9	"The First Senior Discount"	Ted Lange	Sy Rosen	June 7, 2013
20	10	"The First Trial"	Ted Lange	Jacqueline McKinley & Antonia March	June 14, 2013
21	11	"The First Veep Down"	Ted Lange	Nzinga Khadalie-Kemp	June 21, 2013
23	13	"The First Job"	Ted Lange	Jacqueline McKinley & Antonia March	June 28, 2013
24	14	"The First Fifties Family"	Ted Lange	Michael Carrington	July 21, 2013
25	15	"The First Pageant"	Ted Lange	Robyn Adams	August 9, 2013
26	16	"The First Second Couple"	Jackée Harry	Dan Rosen	August 16, 2013
27	17	"The First Friends"	Ted Lange	Fred Johnson	November 22, 2013
28	18	"The First Love Exchange"	Ted Lange	Scott Satin	November 28, 2013
29	19	"The First Scandal"	Ted Lange	Greg Weisman	November 8, 2014
30	20	"The First Bet"	Ted Lange	Scott Satin	November 15, 2014
31	21	"The First Initiative"	Ted Lange	Scott Satin	November 22, 2014
32	22	"The First Workout"	Ted Lange	Greg Weisman	January 31, 2015
33	23	"The First Whodunit"	Ted Lange	Greg Weisman	February 7, 2015
34	24	"The First Snoop"	Ted Lange	Scott Satin	February 14, 2015
35	25	"The First Tell-All"	Jackée Harry	Greg Weisman	February 21, 2015
36	26	"The First Intern"	Jackée Harry	Greg Weisman	April 25, 2015
