= Yul Spencer =

American actor

- Born: Yul Spencer
- Years active: 1992 — present
- Website: http://www.yulspencer.com

Yul Spencer is an American actor, writer, comedian, stand-up comic and producer. He has appeared on BET's Comic View, Comedy Central's "Make Me Laugh", has a 1-Man show entitled "Ya Gotta Go Higher", appeared as Trent in Two Can Play That Game (2001), as Tyrez 'Spank' Wallace in The Shield, and on the TV Series Malcolm & Eddie. He also plays the role of the emcee in the Absolut Vodka "Lemon Drop" campaign alongside Ali Larter. Spencer also appears as one of the judges in Megan Lee's music video for "Destiny", directed by Timothy Tau.

== Filmography ==
- Megan Lee's Destiny (2011) - Judge Randy Spence
- Tori & Dean: Inn Love (2008) (Associate Producer)
- The Shield (2006) - Tyrez Spank Wallace
- Show Me The Funny (2004) (TV Series) - Comedian
- Romeo! (2003) (TV Series) - Jerome
- Two Can Play That Game (2001) - Trent
- Funny Futhermuckers in Concert, Volume 2 (2001) - Comedian
- Malcolm & Eddie (1999) - Yul Lee Spencer
- BET's Comic View - Himself
- Comedy Central's Make Me Laugh - Himself
