= The First Family (TV series) =

American sitcom

- Genre: Family sitcom
- Created by: Byron Allen
- Starring: Christopher B. Duncan; Kellita Smith; Jackée; Yara Shahidi; Khylin Rhambo; Sayeed Shahidi; Layla Crawford; John Witherspoon
- Theme music composer: Brian Wayy
- Country of origin: United States
- Original language: English
- No. of seasons: 2
- No. of episodes: 36 (list of episodes)

Production
- Executive producers: Byron Allen; Scott Satin; Carolyn Folks; Jennifer Lucas; Kriss Turner
- Camera setup: Multi-camera
- Running time: Approx. 20 minutes
- Production company: Entertainment Studios

Original release
- Network: First-run syndication
- Release: September 22, 2012 – April 25, 2015

The First Family is an American sitcom that debuted in first-run syndication in the United States on September 22, 2012. Created by Byron Allen and produced by Allen's production company Entertainment Studios, the series (along with Mr. Box Office which debuted the same weekend and is also produced by Entertainment Studios) is the first situation comedy to air in first-run syndication since the 2000 cancellation of Malibu, CA.

== Premise ==
The series centers on William Johnson (Christopher B. Duncan), a politician who attempts to balance his family life with his wife Katherine (Kellita Smith) and their two sons and two daughters as they adjust to living in the White House, while maintaining his duties as the second African-American and 45th President of the United States. William, in turn, also has to deal with other family members, including his father Alvin (John Witherspoon) and his boisterous sister-in-law Pauletta (Jackée), who despite their constant bickering will sometimes partner up for various schemes.

== Cast ==
=== Main ===
- Christopher B. Duncan – President William Johnson
- Kellita Smith – First Lady Katherine Johnson, William's wife
- Jackée – Pauletta Birdsong, Katherine's sister
- Yara Shahidi (episodes 1–23) – Chloe Johnson, William and Katherine's first daughter
- Khylin Rhambo – Charles Johnson, William and Katherine's first son
- Sayeed Shahidi (episodes 1–23) – Lucas Johnson, William and Katherine's second son
- Layla Crawford – Olivia Johnson, William and Katherine's second daughter
- John Witherspoon – Alvin Johnson, William's father

=== Recurring ===
- Gladys Knight – Carolyn Johnson, William's mother
- Michael D. Roberts – Bernard
- Marla Gibbs – Grandma Eddy
- Lee Reherman – Agent Hardison
- John Eric Bentley – Agent Hill

== Episodes ==
Season	Episodes	Originally released	
Season	Episodes	First released	Last released
1	10	September 22, 2012	January 26, 2013
2	26	February 16, 2013	April 25, 2015

== Production ==
The First Family is primarily syndicated to stations affiliated with The CW and MyNetworkTV and to independent stations for broadcast in weekend primetime timeslots. The series was supposed to produce a total of 104 episodes, borrowing a similarly-formatted episode order as several sitcoms produced and distributed by Debmar-Mercury, such as Tyler Perry's House of Payne and Anger Management (although the aforementioned Debmar-Mercury produced programs operated under a syndication model where the programs were sold to cable networks with an initial ten-episode order and obtained an additional order of at least 90 episodes if the series was successful).

The series, which was sold as part of a two-hour comedy block with Mr. Box Office, was initially picked up by stations owned by Tribune Broadcasting, Weigel Broadcasting and CBS Television Stations. By May 2012, the program had been sold to stations in markets covering approximately 85% of the United States.

Although the series centers around an African-American president and his family, show creator and executive producer Byron Allen denies that former U.S. president Barack Obama and his family served as the basis for the Johnson family in the series, noting major differences between the show's fictional Johnson family and the real-life Obama family: the William Johnson character is written as being the 45th president (thus, in this fictional universe, Johnson is Obama's successor, as Obama is the 44th president), the Johnsons moved to Washington from Detroit (the Obama family resided in Chicago prior to the presidency), the family in the series has four children (two male and two female, whereas Barack and Michelle Obama have only two children, both female) and that the family's dog is a Golden Retriever (as opposed to a Portuguese Water Dog).

== Syndication ==
On April 4, 2013, Centric acquired the cable syndication rights to all past and future episodes of The First Family, along with Mr. Box Office, with both series began airing on the channel on April 19, 2013.

== Accolades ==
Year	Award	Category	Recipient	Result	Ref.
2013	Young Artist Award	Best Performance in a TV Series – Leading Young Actress	Layla Crawford	Nominated	
2013	NAACP Image Award	Outstanding Actress in a Comedy Series	Kellita Smith	Nominated	
2013	NAACP Image Award	Outstanding Supporting Actress in a Comedy Series	Gladys Knight	Nominated	
2014	Young Artist Award	Best Performance in a TV Series – Leading Young Actress	Layla Crawford	Won	
2014	Young Artist Award	Best Performance in a TV Series – Guest Starring Young Actor 17–21	Tajh Bellow	Nominated	
