= Samad Davis =

American film producer

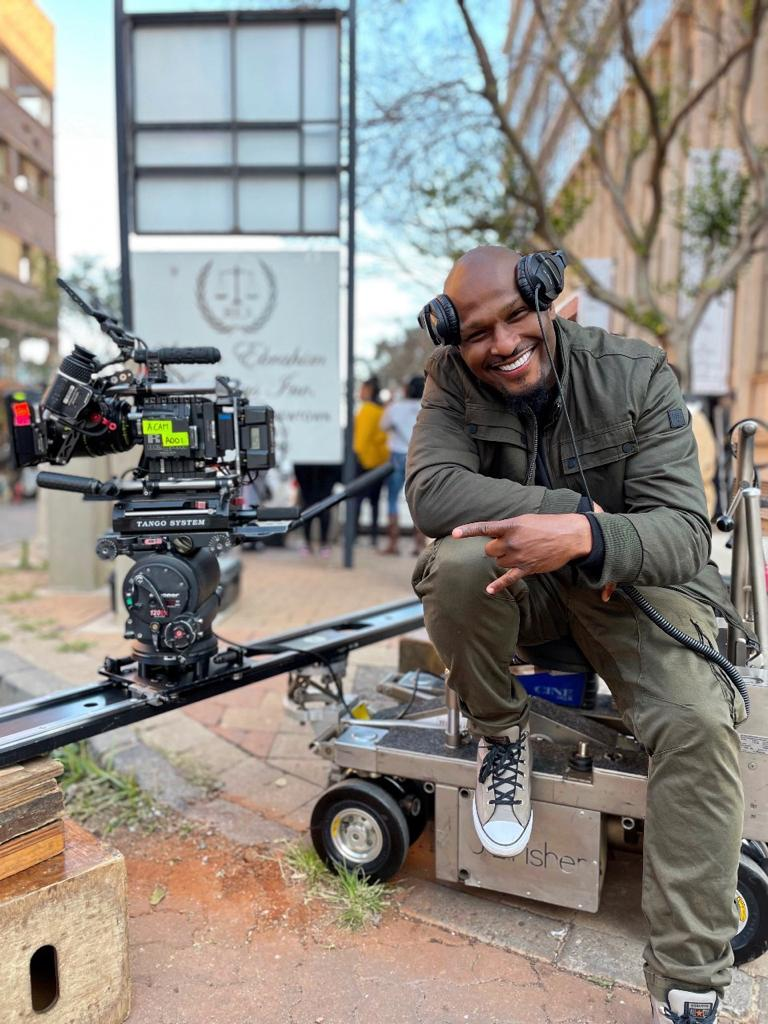
- Davis on set in 2022
- Citizenship: American
- Occupations: Film director, Film producer
- Years active: 2001–present
- Known for: Film, Entrepreneurship, Investment, Mining
- Notable work: Three Can Play That Game, Kings of Jo'burg, Mooz-lum
- Television: Terror Lake Drive

Samad Davis is an American film producer and director, He directed Three Can Play That Game, Love By Chance and Kings of Jo'burg.

== Early life ==
Samad was born and raised in Newark, New Jersey.

== Career ==
Samad began his film career in 2001 with "Comedy Only in Da Hood". In 2007, Samad directed Three Can Play That Game, a sequel to the 2002 movie, Two Can Play That Game.

To expand his work in Africa, he began in Ghana, where he directed the music video for Becca's "African Woman". His work won Music Video of the Year at the 2011 4syte Music Video Awards, a Ghanaian awards ceremony.

In 2011, Davis directed the music video for "Dadie Kye" by Samini, a Ghanaian dancehall artiste. The video was awarded Most Gifted Ragga Dancehall Video at the Channel O Music Video Awards in 2011 and gave Ghana its first Channel O Music Video Award.

In 2013 his professional journey in television began when he launched his first TV show in the South African market, the Top Actor SA (later renamed Top Actor Africa) as a reality show on the African feed of cable channel BET to discover acting talent in Africa.

He directed and released Love By Chance in 2017. It featured at the Carthage Film Festival, the Greater Cleveland Film Fest as well as the American Black Film Festival. That same year the film won the Best International Feature Film at the Urban Mediamakers Film Festival.

In collaboration with Shona Ferguson and Connie Ferguson, they developed and executive produced the first season of the Kings of Jo'burg franchise, released in 2020 on Netflix. In 2023, Netflix released season two of Kings of Jo’burg with Davis as Executive Producer, Showrunner and Lead Director.

== Filmography ==
Filmography
Year	Title	Role	Type	Notes
2007	Three Can Play That Game	Film Director	Film	Sequel to Two Can Play That Game
2010	Mooz-lum	Film Producer	Film	Winner of Best Narrative Feature Film at the Urban World Film Festival
2013	Top Actor SA	Executive Producer	Reality Show	
2017	Love By Chance	Film Director	Film	
2020–2022	Kings of Jo'burg	Executive Producer Season One Showrunner – Season Two	Television Series	
2020–2022	Terror Lake Drive	Film Producer	Miniseries	
