= Antonio Sacre =

American storyteller

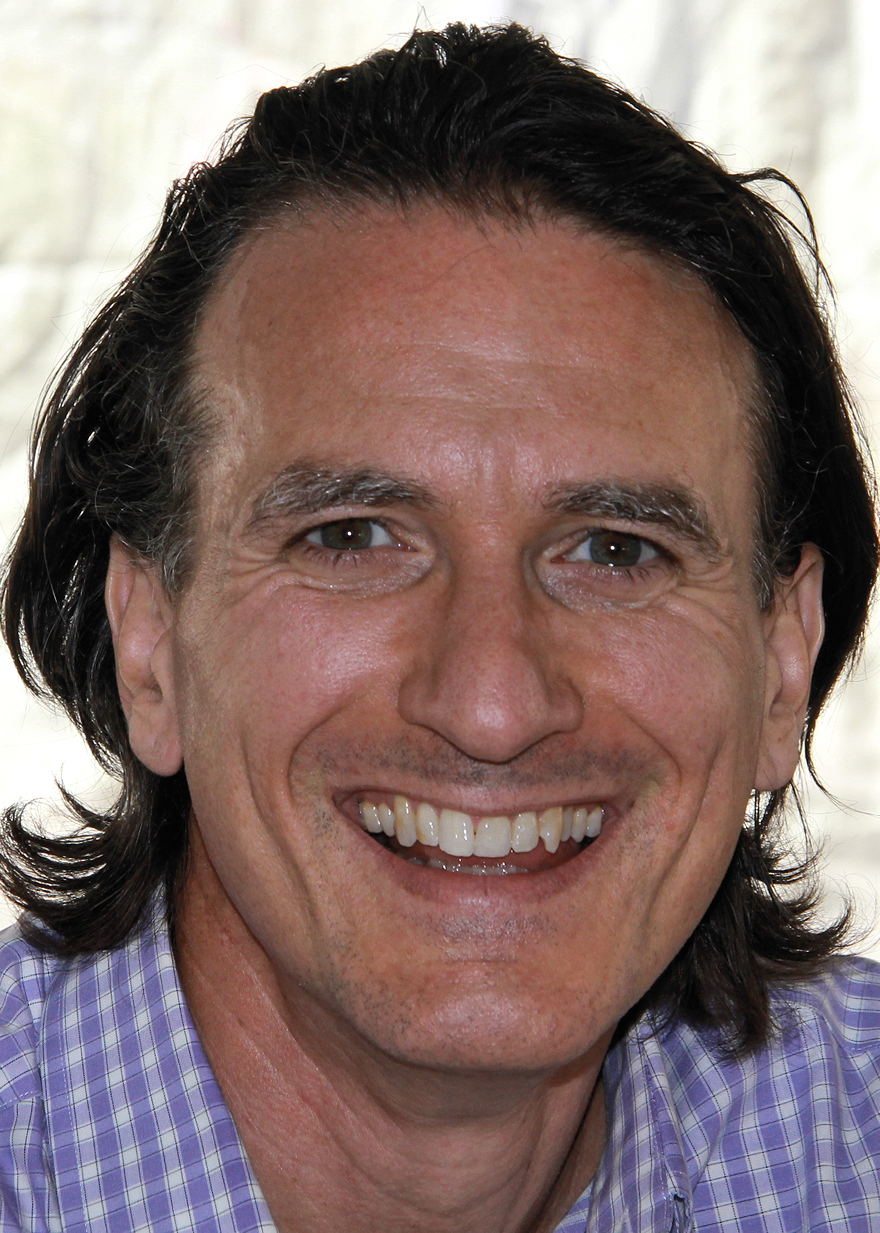
- Sacre at the 2014 Texas Book Festival
- Born: September 23, 1968 (age 57); Boston, Massachusetts, U.S.
- Spouse: Missi Pyle (m. 2000; div. 2005)
- Children: 2
- Writing career
- Notable awards: International Reading Association Notable Books

Antonio Sacre (born September 23, 1968) is an American author, solo performer, and storyteller. He writes and performs internationally, in English and Spanish.

== Personal life ==
Sacre was born in Boston, Massachusetts to an Irish American mother and Cuban father. He earned a BA in English from Boston College and an MA in Theater Arts from Northwestern University.

He acted professionally in Chicago, Illinois in the 1990s and became a member of the Redmoon Theater company. He studied solo performance with Jenny Magnus and Paula Killen and he studied storytelling with Jim May and Rives Collins.

Sacre was married to actress Missi Pyle from 2000 to 2005. He married again in 2008 and has two children.

== Author ==
Sacre's first children's picture book, The Barking Mouse, was published in 2003 by Albert Whitman & Company. In 2004, it was named among the International Reading Association Notable Books for a Global Society. It was also featured on the Teaching Tolerance website.

His next children's picture book, La Noche Buena, was published in 2010 by Abrams Books for Young Readers, and was selected for inclusion in the California Readers Book Collections for School Libraries.

A Mango in the Hand, a Story of Proverbs, another children's picture book, was published in 2011 by Abrams Books for Young Readers and was named Parents’ Choice Approved. It was also selected for inclusion in the California Readers Book Collections for School Libraries.

Sacre's fourth book, My Name is Cool: Stories from a Cuban-Irish-American Storyteller, was published in 2013 by Familius Books. It is a collection of stories for young adults.

Sacre is also a published poet.

== Solo performer / Playwright ==
As a solo performer, Sacre has written for and performed in festivals and theaters in New York City, Los Angeles, Chicago, Washington D.C., San Francisco, Phoenix, and elsewhere.

He premiered The Hick, The Spic, and The Chick at The Rhinoceros Theater Festival in Chicago in 1996. The show went on to The New York International Fringe Festival where it won the Best in FringeNYC Festival Award.

In 1999, Sacre again won Best in FringeNYC, this time for his solo show My Penis - In and Out of Trouble, as directed by Jenny Magnus. The show was revived in 2010 under the direction of Paul Stein in Los Angeles, where it won Best of the Hollywood Fringe Festival.

In 2004, Sacre was commissioned by the Smithsonian to write and direct a play for children, Pochito’s Pride, for production at the Discovery Theater.

In 2011 Sacre premiered The Next Best Thing, directed by Paul Stein, and had runs in both Los Angeles and New York. The show won Best of the Hollywood Fringe Festival, won a United Solo Theatre Award for Best Storyteller, was nominated for the LA Weekly Theater Award for Best Solo Performance, and was chosen by LA Weekly as a Top-Ten Theater Experience in Los Angeles for 2011.

Sacre's 2012 show, Let Them Eat Meat, was directed by Paul Stein and premiered at the United Solo Theatre Festival on Theatre Row in New York where Sacre won Best Storyteller. The show was revived the following year in Los Angeles with the Solo Collective Theatre Company.

In 2015, Sacre was commissioned to write a 10-minute play for The Car Plays, performed at La Jolla Playhouse.

In 2020, Sacre performed his show, Let Them Eat Meat, as part of the HA Comedy Festival in San Antonio.

== Storyteller ==
As a storyteller, Sacre has performed at the National Book Festival at the Library of Congress, the John F. Kennedy Center for the Performing Arts, the National Storytelling Festival, the Timpanogos Storytelling Festival, and the Fabelhaft! International Storytelling Festival, as well as at museums, schools, and libraries both nationally and internationally. He has also released four storytelling recordings.

In 1994, Sacre started working with teachers and school districts nationwide to foster storytelling culture in schools. In addition to performances for the students that center on drama, storytelling, and writing, he conducts teacher in-services and district-wide trainings. He is committed to helping children discover and embrace their own multicultural backgrounds.

From 2014-2022, Sacre served as the storyteller-in-residence at the UCLA Lab School on the UCLA campus in Westwood, CA.

== Select bibliography ==
=== Books ===
- The Barking Mouse. 2003. (ISBN 0807505714)
- La Noche Buena. 2010. (ISBN 0810989670)
- A Mango in the Hand. 2011. (ISBN 0810997347)
- My Name is Cool: Stories from a Cuban-Irish-American Storyteller. 2013. (ISBN 1938301560)
- My Name is Cool. 2022. (ISBN 1641706570)

=== Contributions ===
- “The Barking Mouse”. More Ready To Tell Tales. 2000.
- “Looking for Papito”. University of Dubuque World View Seminar I: The Good Life. 2004.
- “I Need A Poem”. Sound & Literary Art Book. Issue 2. 2007.
- “For Hubbard Slammers”. Sound & Literary Art Book. Issue 2. 2007.
- “Sue”. Sound & Literary Art Book. Issue 2. 2007.
- “Francesca and Paolo”. Sound & Literary Art Book. Issue 2. 2007.
- “Immigration and Literacy in America: Sometimes it Pays to Speak Another Language”. Literacy Development in the Storytelling Classroom. 2009.

=== Plays ===
- The Hick, The Spic, and The Chick. 1996.
- Brown, Black, & White All Over. 1998.
- My Penis – In and Out of Trouble. 1998.
- Eleven Dollar Prophet. 1999.
- Up to the Sky. 2002.
- Rise like a Penis from the Flames. 2007.
- My Rooster is Huge. 2009.
- The Next Best Thing. 2011.
- Let Them Eat Meat. 2012.

=== Audio recordings ===
- Looking For Papito: Family Stories from Latin America. 1996.
- Water Torture, the Barking Mouse, and Other Tales of Wonder. 2000.
- Faster Than Sooner - Tales of An Immigrants Son. 2001.
- Uncle Tom and the Roller Coaster of Death. 2011.
- World's Second-Best Dad. 2020.

=== Video recordings ===
- Brown and Black and White All Over. 1998.
- Tribes & Bridges at the Steppenwolf Theatre. 2000.
- The Next Best Thing. 2011.
- Let Them Eat Meat. 2012.

== See also ==
- List of Cuban-American writers
- List of Cuban Americans
