= Three Can Play That Game =

- Directed by: Samad Davis
- Written by: Mark Brown
- Produced by: Dianne Ashford; Lita Richardson; Rob Hardy; Vivica A. Fox; Will Packer
- Starring: Vivica A. Fox; Jason George; Tony Rock; Jazsmin Lewis; Terri J. Vaughn; Kellita Smith
- Cinematography: Tommy Maddox-Upshaw
- Edited by: Deanna Nowell
- Music by: Kenyatta Beasley
- Production companies: Stage 6 Films; Rainforest Films
- Distributed by: Sony Pictures Home Entertainment
- Release dates: October 2007 (American Black Film Festival); February 12, 2008 (United States)
- Running time: 91 minutes
- Country: United States
- Language: English

Three Can Play That Game is a 2007 romantic comedy film directed by Samad Davis and starring Jason George, Jazsmin Lewis, and Vivica A. Fox. It is a sequel to the 2001 film Two Can Play That Game.

== Plot ==
When Byron (George) hits the big time, no one is happier than his girlfriend Tiffany (Lewis) - that is, until she catches him flirting with his sly new project manager Carla (Kellita Smith). While contemplating whether to break it off with Byron, Tiffany's best friend tells her about a specialist for women whose men can not control their primitive urges. Enter Ms. Shanté Smith (Fox). Using her knowledge of the male psyche and her new Five Step program, Shanté gives Tiffany the necessary tools she needs to "train" Byron and teach him a lesson for his behavior. However, Byron also has expert advice in his corner, courtesy of his best friend Gizzard (Tony Rock). Once again, the battle for the title of the superior sex is on.

== Cast ==
- Vivica A. Fox — Shanté Smith
- Jason George — Byron Thompson
- Tony Rock — Gizzard
- Jazsmin Lewis — Tiffany
- Terri J. Vaughn — Linda
- Kellita Smith — Carla
- Donna Biscoe — Mrs. Thompson
- John Atwood — Dexter McKinzie
- Liz Langford — Karen Thompson
- L. Warren Young — Mr. Thompson
- Melyssa Ford — Candy
- Rashan Ali — Monica
- Masika Kalysha - Woman
