= Christmas vs. the Walters =

- Poster
- Directed by: Peter D'Amato
- Written by: Ante Novakovic
- Produced by: Ante Novakovic; Rob Simmons; Jared Safier; DJ Dodd
- Starring: Shawnee Smith; Bruce Dern
- Music by: Rhyan D'Errico; Jared Forman
- Distributed by: Safier Entertainment
- Release date: November 5, 2021
- Country: United States
- Language: English

Christmas vs. the Walters is a 2021 American indie Christmas comedy film directed by Peter D'Amato, and starring Shawnee Smith and Bruce Dern.

== Cast ==
- Shawnee Smith as Diane Walters
- Dean Winters as Brian, Diane's husband
- Chris Elliott as Dr. Tom
- Bruce Dern as Cliff Walters
- Caroline Aaron as Diane's mother
- Betsy Beutler as Kate, Diane's sister
- Paris Bravo as Abby Walters
- Nate Torrence as Shelly, Diane's nemesis
- Jack McGee as Sydney
- Richard Thomas as Roger
- John Farley as Chuck
- Christopher Brian Roach as Officer Morrelli
- Jaime Zevallos as Ted
- Joseph D'Onofrio as Tony the Elf
- Sal Rendino as Stew
- Carrie Kim as Miranda
- Kresh Novakovic as Dr. Klein
- Al Linea as Carl
- Myles Clohessy as Gene
- Gianni Ciardiello as Toby
- Christopher Riley as Dougie Walters
- Tyler Simmons as Paxton
- Julie Stackhouse as Monica
- Kenishia Green as Jessica
- Tony Ferro as Officer Borrelli
- Christine James Walker as Michelle
- Sebastian DAmato as the Desk Sergeant

== Release ==
In July 2021, Safier Entertainment acquired worldwide distribution rights to the film, which was released theatrically on November 5, 2021. It was also released on VOD and Digital Platforms on November 26, 2021.

== See also ==
- List of Christmas films
