= Smith & Pyle =

US musical group

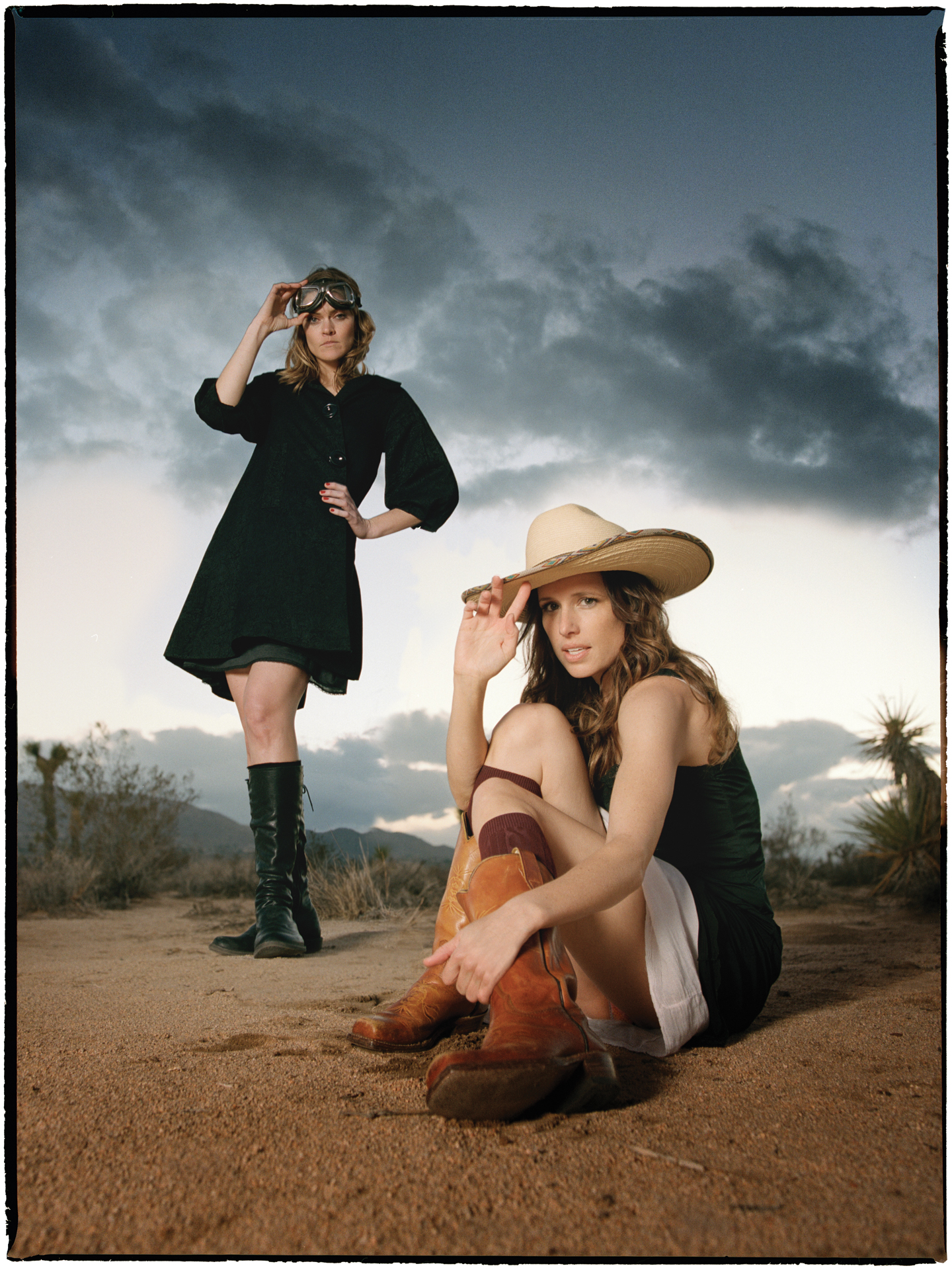
- Smith (right) & Pyle (left)

Background information
- Origin: Los Angeles, California, U.S.
- Genres: Country
- Years active: 2007–2011, 2025-present
- Label: Urban Prairie Records (independent label)
- Members: Shawnee Smith; Missi Pyle
- Website: http://smithandpyle.com

Smith & Pyle is an American country music duo from Los Angeles, California, composed of actresses Shawnee Smith and Missi Pyle. They were originally active from 2007-2011, until regrouping in December of 2025.

== History ==
Shawnee Smith and Missi Pyle met in 2007 while filming an ABC comedy pilot titled Traveling in Packs. After completing the show, Smith invited Pyle to join her in attending the Coachella Valley Music and Arts Festival. While stuck in traffic, Pyle repeatedly stated that one of her dreams was to be in a rock band. Smith had been in three bands, including her punk-metal group Fydolla Ho, with whom she toured the US and UK, and agreed to form a band with Pyle so that she could fulfill her dream. Within the next year they were in Joshua Tree, California, with Chris Goss recording their first album, It's OK to Be Happy, at Rancho de la Luna.

The band was originally called Dirty Byrd, but due to the name already being taken, the actresses moved onto the name Polly Speaks. Smith & Pyle was decided on after producer Chris Goss suggested it.

The band officially disbanded in 2011 before a second album was completed. Smith stated in a 2013 interview promoting her FX sitcom, Anger Management, that she reached a point where she felt like she didn't belong on stage anymore and wanted to focus on her children and her television work.

On December 26, 2025, Smith & Pyle resurged on Instagram and YouTube with a new cover and music video for their song "Spankin'," announcing their return as a duo.

== Genre ==
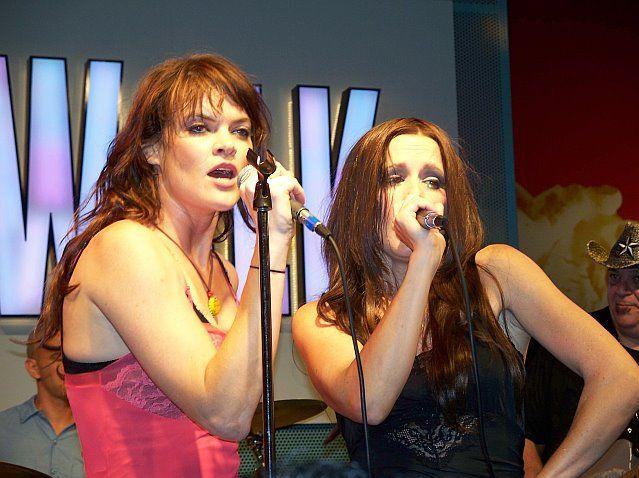
Smith and Pyle performing at Universal CityWalk in 2008

Although there are other musicians who perform with the band, Smith and Pyle play instruments (both play the guitar and Smith occasionally plays drums and tambourine during live performances) and collaboratively write the songs. Most songs are written together except for "I Wish You Were Dead," written by Pyle after a bad break-up, and "Sugar," written by Smith after her divorce from ex-husband Jason Reposar in 2003.

Shortly after meeting they began collaborating. At the time of their collaboration Dauzat served as a guitarist for Kelly Osbourne. Most of the songs written by Smith and Dauzat appear on It's OK to Be Happy.

Smith and Pyle stated in October 2009 that they had been traveling to and from Joshua Tree to write and record new material. They are also writing and pitching ideas for either a TV show or movie centered around the band. Pyle revealed in a blog on April 12, 2010 that the band had made official plans to start recording their second album in the summer of 2010. Similar to the first album, It's OK to be Happy, it will be recorded at Rancho de la Luna and will be produced by Chris Goss. She also mentioned they will be planning more tour dates throughout the spring and summer of 2010.

== Performances ==
Smith & Pyle's first live performance was in Plano, Texas at Love and War in Texas on January 18, 2008.

The band performed at a USO show for a Navy Seal reunion on July 19, 2008 in Virginia Beach, VA. They described performing for the troops as "awesome" regardless of the attendees age.

The performance at NASCAR on February 24, 2008 was almost canceled due to rainy conditions. They wanted to sign a waiver saying they did not care if they got electrocuted, but they ended up using two wireless microphones, directly plugging in acoustic guitars, and not using drum microphones. Guitarist Mark Christian described the crowd as a small sea of rain coats.

Other performances include: Fangoria Radio (April 26, 2008), Adventure Con Knoxville (June 14, 2008), The Mint Los Angeles (2008), Maloof Money Cup (July 13, 2008), Universal CityWalk (August 9, 2008), Spaceland (March 18, 2009), The Mint Los Angeles (May 13, 2009), The Mint Los Angeles (June 19, 2009), The Key Club (August 15, 2009), Fairplain Yacht Club (October 24, 2009), Silver City (October 25, 2009), Quaker Steak & Lube (October 28, 2009), Black Hawk Saloon (October 29, 2009), Halftime Bar and Grill (October 30, 2009), Tomahawks (October 31, 2009), The Mint Los Angeles (November 13, 2009), Hotel Café (March 8, 2010), Pappy and Harriet's Pioneertown Palace (March 27, 2010), The Redwood Bar and Grill (May 13, 2010), and Topanga Days Country Fair (May 29, 2010).

All October 2009 performances took place in West Virginia as Shawnee was making appearances at local movie theaters to promote Saw VI. Pyle stated in October 2009 that the band only played West Virginia because Smith was four months from giving birth to her third child. They're planning on doing a bigger tour, including West Virginia again, in the spring of 2010.

Smith & Pyle opened for Tenacious D guitarist Kyle Gass' side project, Trainwreck, on March 27, 2010.

== It's OK to Be Happy ==
Album cover for It's OK to Be Happy

Full track list:

- "Call Down a Blessing"
- "Spankin'"
- "I Ain't"
- "Sugar"
- "Frumpy Flannel"
- "I Like You Too Much"
- "Flower in My Hair"
- "The Show"
- "Do You Ever Think of Me"
- "Too Damn Tired"
- "I Wish You Were Dead"
- "Anthem"
- "Slippery Hips"
- "Ass"
- "Peter Pan"
- "Go Rest High on That Mountain"

It's OK to Be Happy was produced by Chris Goss, who has worked with bands such as Queens of the Stone Age and Stone Temple Pilots, and recorded at Rancho de la Luna. The album was released digitally through iTunes and Amazon.com on July 29, 2008. Smith and Pyle admitted that they went into the recording studio without a single song fully completed, but they managed to finish the album with 16 full tracks.

Guest musicians on the album include Jerry Cantrell (guitarist and vocalist of the band Alice in Chains), Bingo, Stephen Smoak, Bobby Ferguson, and Ray Wood. The album also features Smith's children, Verve and Jakson. The kids are listed in the album credits as having vocals and spoken narrative tracks for "The Show" and "Anthem."

A video diary of the recording process was made and the band plans to release either through an internet webisode series or a television show on a network. Smith stated on Fangoria radio that Smith & Pyle want to bring the musical variety show back. While nothing has been fully decided, the band has released four short videos thus far: Three short video blogs on the band's YouTube page and a 10-minute video titled "Desert Sessions" on Vimeo.

== Personal lives ==
Smith and Pyle were married in a faux ceremony at the All Love is Equal Launch Party in West Hollywood on November 18, 2009. The two actresses pretended to get married in support of repealing Prop 8 in California. Actor Hal Sparks dressed as a priest and performed the ceremony, with them using rainbow-colored hula hoops as rings.

The band, and Smith's children, made a brief guest appearance on The Jay Leno Show on November 26, 2009. Leno surprised the group at Smith's home and assisted them in singing a Christmas medley in their rehearsal space.

== Other band members ==
- Mark Christian – lead guitar
- David Catching – guitar
- David Jones Henderson – drums
- David Henning – bass
- Chris Goss – guitar, vocals
- Mat Dauzat – guitar
- Kris Swensen – guitar, vocals
- Franz Stahl – guitar
- Travis Raab – guitar, vocals

== Discography ==
=== Albums ===
- It's OK to Be Happy (2008)

=== Singles ===
- "One Night Stand" (2010)
- "Rafael" (2010)
