= Redmoon Theater =

US nonprofit theatrical company

Redmoon Theater was a Chicago based nonprofit theatrical company under the direction of Jim Lasko and Frank Maugeri that specialized in site-specific productions emphasizing visual spectacle. Productions were often outdoors, sometimes ticketed, sometimes freely viewable in public spaces. It is now defunct.

== Production history ==
Redmoon Theater was founded in 1990 by puppeteer Blair Thomas and choreographer Lauri Macklin. In 1992, Macklin left and Thomas continued on his own until Jim Lasko joined the theater.

They had indoor theater productions of classic stories like Moby-Dick and Frankenstein, while beginning to explore outdoor spaces. Mr. Thomas left the theater in 1998, leaving it to Jim Lasko. In 2009, Mr. Lasko accepted a one-year appointment to become the Artist in Residence for the City of Chicago. After 13 years of working as an artist and community leader with the organization, Frank Maugeri assumed the role of artistic director. A year later, the duo joined forces to co-lead Redmoon.

== Productions ==
The company has created theater productions, community projects and large-scale, site-specific performances, that have been experienced across Chicago from Belmont Harbor and the Jackson Park Lagoon to the façade of the Museum of Contemporary Art. Redmoon has also worked in traditional theater venues from the stage of Harris Theater to Steppenwolf. In addition, the company has produced international projects in the Netherlands, Ireland, France, and Australia.

=== Major works ===
From 1995 to 2002, Redmoon produced All Hallows' Eve, a ritual performance during Halloween in Chicago's Logan Square neighborhood, that in its final year, brought an audience of over 10,000.

In 2007, Redmoon created a large-scale commissioned work for the newly created festival Looptopia, which featured site installations throughout the Loop with a procession down Washington Street in a performance in Daley Plaza for more than 20,000 spectators.

In 2010, co-produced by Redmoon Theater and the Museum of Contemporary Art, Chicago, "The Astronaut's Birthday," a production reminiscent of a graphic novel, was projected onto the west façade of the MCA as audience members watched from the plaza.

== Style ==
Highly influenced by contemporary art works and ancient theatrical forms, Redmoon Theater created a performance style that is part pageantry, gadgetry, acrobatics, and ephemera.

== Reception ==
The company has been hailed by the Chicago Tribune as “impossibly inventive” and “full of visual wit,” and described by the Chicago Sun-Times as “one of the only theaters that can keep a 2-year-old and a 50-year-old equally enchanted and filled with wide-eyed wonder.”

== See also ==
- Antonio Sacre
- Chris Lafferty
