= Sole Survivor (1984 film) =

- Code Red DVD's release artwork
- Directed by: Thom Eberhardt
- Written by: Thom Eberhardt
- Produced by: Don Barkemeyer
- Starring: Anita Skinner; Kurt Johnson; Caren Larkey
- Cinematography: Russell Carpenter
- Edited by: Thom Eberhardt
- Music by: David F. Anthony
- Production companies: R. & C. Larkey
- Distributed by: International Film Marketing
- Release date: March 16, 1984
- Running time: 85 minutes
- Country: United States
- Language: English

Sole Survivor is a 1984 American horror film written and directed by Thom Eberhardt, in his feature film debut. The film received mixed reviews.

== Plot ==
Denise (Anita Skinner), a television commercial producer, emerges unscathed as the sole survivor of a plane crash. However, she feels as if she is about to be "caught" by something. She flirts with Brian (Kurt Johnson), a doctor at the hospital, who is convinced that she is simply experiencing "survivor's syndrome". Denise also receives ambiguous warnings from psychic ex-actress Carla (Caren Larkey) who predicted the crash. A series of strange sightings and encounters of zombie-like people escalates until it is apparent that something is trying to kill her. Brian, who has become romantically involved with Denise, initially does not believe her.

Plagued by night fears as well as a series of near-miss accidents, Denise confides in her friend and neighbor, Kristy (Robin Davidson) about what is happening. Denise theorizes that she escaped her fate by surviving the plane crash and all of the strange events occurring are because she has to meet the death she dodged. Kristy is skeptical.

After Denise falls asleep on the couch, Kristy enters Denise's house, intending to entertain herself. A man breaks into the house and kills Kristy by drowning her. Denise walks in afterwards and barely escapes the intruder. Upon calling the police, they question her and cannot find Kristy's body. They tell her that the man she saw is dead and has been for days. Brian talks with his friend Artie (William Snare), a pathologist, who tells him about irregular discoveries in several recently deceased people (which include a little girl, a homeless man, as well as the man that attempted to kill Denise). They all had lividity from their blood draining into their legs as if they had been walking around after death. Brian begins to believe that Denise is telling the truth.

Meanwhile, the undead Kristy murders a taxi driver who stops for her, and both of them attempt to kill Denise the following evening at her house. Brian arrives with a gun to protect Denise, but he is stabbed and killed by the undead Kristy. Denise manages to escape and drives through the city, but her car breaks down and she finds herself alone on the streets. Frightened, she boards a bus and goes to Carla's house with Brian's gun. She confides in Carla about what is going on and asks for help. Carla, who has not spoken a word since Denise arrived at her house, takes the gun, revealing herself to be also undead, having committed suicide earlier by slashing her wrists. She shoots Denise, killing her.

In the final scene, Artie is at the morgue with the bodies of Denise, Brian, Carla, Kristy and the taxi driver. Artie continues to be puzzled at how the blood in the bodies of the last three corpses drained into their legs. After talking to a skeptical police detective over the phone about the uncanny irregularities, Artie begins to type out a report to document this. One of the bodies sits up on its gurney behind him. Hearing the sound, he turns around just as the movie ends.

== Cast ==
- Anita Skinner as Denise Watson
- Kurt Johnson as Brian Richardson
- Robin Davidson as Kristy Cutler
- Caren Larkey as Karla Davis
- Andrew Boyer as Blake
- Daniel Cartwell as Lieutenant Patterson
- Wendy Dake as Roxie
- Steven Isbell as The Cabbie
- William Snare as Artie
- Clay Wilcox as Randy
- Brinke Stevens as Jennifer
- Leon Robinson as The Gang Leader

== Production ==
Sole Survivor was Thom Eberhardt's debut as a feature film director and writer. The film was shot in various locations including Los Angeles. Known for its atmospheric tension and slow-building horror, the film combines elements of supernatural and psychological horror with zombie motifs.

== Release ==
The film was given a limited release theatrically in the United States by International Film Marketing in March 1984. Vestron Video released it on VHS in 1985. It saw a DVD release in the United States by Code Red DVD in 2008.

== Reception ==
Tristan Sinns of Dread Central rated it 4/5 stars and compared it positively to the Final Destination film series, highlighting its chilling atmosphere and suspenseful storytelling. Tom Becker of DVD Verdict described it as "a chilly and effective little creeper" that pre-dates Final Destination.

Academic Peter Dendle, in The Zombie Movie Encyclopedia, calls the film "essentially a reworking of the classic Carnival of Souls" with zombies.

Erich Kuersten of Acidemic Journal of Film and Media awarded the film 3.5 out of 4 stars, praising the film's atmosphere and characterizations, and compared Eberhardt's work positively to John Carpenter.

Bill Gibron of DVD Talk rated it 2.5/5 stars but noted the film's slow pace made it dull in places.

TV Guide gave the film 1 out of 5 stars, calling it "dull".
