= Exposed (2003 film) =

- Directed by: Misti L. Barnes; Steve Foldseth
- Screenplay by: Misti L. Barnes
- Produced by: Misti Barnes; Isabelle Bourduas; Sandra Cruze; Eve Elting; Joseph M. Smith
- Starring: Brenda Strong; Lumi Cavazos; Gia Carides; Tate Donovan; Missi Pyle.
- Edited by: Andi Armaganian; H. Charles Riedl
- Music by: Mark Edward Lewis
- Release date: 2003
- Country: United States
- Language: English

Exposed is a 2003 American independent comedy film written and directed by Misti L. Barnes, starring Brenda Strong, Lumi Cavazos, Gia Carides, Tate Donovan and Missi Pyle.

== Plot ==
Bob Smith (Donovan), the host of the scandalous news show "Probe", launches an investigation to dig up dirt on three popular television celebrities who are up for a "Woman of Distinction Award".

== Cast ==
- Brenda Strong as Susan Andrews
- Gia Carides as Jade Blake
- Lumi Cavazos as Laura Silvera
- Tate Donovan as Bob Smith
- David Rasche as Warren Ward
- Tom Irwin as Erik Parsons
- Lindsay Sloane as Minnie
- T. J. Thyne as Max
- Missi Pyle as Amy
- Pepe Serna as Raoul
- Coolio as "Big Heat"
