= Who's Harry Crumb? =

1989 film by Paul Flaherty

- Theatrical release poster
- Directed by: Paul Flaherty
- Written by: Robert Conte; Peter Martin Wortmann
- Produced by: Arnon Milchan
- Starring: John Candy; Jeffrey Jones; Annie Potts; Tim Thomerson; Barry Corbin; Shawnee Smith
- Cinematography: Stephen M. Katz
- Edited by: Danford B. Greene
- Music by: Michel Colombier
- Production companies: Frostbacks; NBC Productions
- Distributed by: Tri-Star Pictures
- Release date: February 3, 1989
- Running time: 90 minutes
- Country: United States
- Language: English
- Box office: $11 million

Who's Harry Crumb? is a 1989 American comedy mystery film directed by Paul Flaherty and written by Robert Conte and Peter Martin Wortmann. The film stars John Candy, Jeffrey Jones, Annie Potts, Tim Thomerson, Barry Corbin, and Shawnee Smith. Candy plays Harry Crumb, a well-meaning but inept private investigator and the last descendant of the founders of the Crumb & Crumb detective agency. He is assigned to investigate the kidnapping of a wealthy businessman's daughter, unaware that the agency's president, Eliot Draisen (Jones), is responsible for the crime.

Who's Harry Crumb? was released by Tri-Star Pictures on February 3, 1989. It opened in fifth place at the North American box office with $3.9 million and ultimately grossed $11 million. Critical reception was generally negative, with reviewers praising aspects of Candy's performance but criticizing the film's comedy and uneven execution.

== Plot ==
In Beverly Hills, fashion model Jennifer Downing is kidnapped. Her father, multimillionaire P. J. Downing, turns to family friend Eliot Draisen—the president of the Crumb & Crumb private detective agency—to investigate, unaware that Eliot himself is the kidnapper. Eliot assigns Harry Crumb, the last descendant of the agency's distinguished founders, to the case. A bumbling yet dedicated detective with a penchant for disguises, Harry has spent the past ten years at the agency's Tulsa, Oklahoma branch, having been sent there to keep him away from head office. Eliot expects Harry to be ineffective.

Harry meets the Downing family, including Jennifer's overlooked younger sister Nikki and P. J.'s greedy new wife, Helen, who is having an affair with her tennis coach, Vince Barnes. Harry becomes suspicious of Helen after learning Jennifer was kidnapped while using Helen's regular salon appointment. P. J. soon receives a $10 million ransom demand. Meanwhile, Eliot confesses his long-standing love for Helen, who rejects him, admitting she cares only for money and would only consider him if he were wealthy.

Convinced that Helen and Vince are responsible, Harry teams up with Nikki to investigate them. Fearing P. J. will pay the ransom, Helen and Vince accelerate their own plan to kill him so Helen will inherit his fortune. They sabotage the brakes on his car, but Harry and Nikki unknowingly borrow it to follow them. When the brakes fail, Harry crashes into their vehicle. Believing they are being pursued, Helen and Vince flee. Harry instead assumes they attempted to kill him to halt his investigation.

Harry later infiltrates the ventilation system of Vince's apartment building to spy on the pair, unaware that Vince has been lured away by Eliot, who blackmails Helen into sex using knowledge of the affair. Unable to see into the apartment, Harry overhears dialogue from a television program mentioning travel to Buenos Aires, which he misinterprets as the pair's escape plan, an idea that also inspires Eliot. Eliot sends a new ransom note demanding payment by Friday, but Helen intercepts it and changes the deadline to Monday to buy more time for her to kill P.J. Eliot then forces Jennifer, through his accomplice Dwayne, to confirm the original Friday exchange at a horse racing track. On the day, he obtains the ransom money from Harry under the guise of following the kidnapper's instructions and heads to the airport, while Helen and Vince attempt unsuccessfully to intercept him to steal the money.

At the airport, Eliot calls Helen, reveals his role in the kidnapping, and asks her to flee with him to Buenos Aires now that he has the money; she agrees. Vince overhears the call, intercepts them, and takes the money, prompting Helen to side with him. They bind and gag Eliot and leave him behind before boarding a plane. Harry and Nikki arrive and commandeer a stair truck to pursue the aircraft. During the chaotic chase, a luggage trolley crashes into the building where Dwayne is holding Jennifer, electrocuting him. Nikki drives the stair truck into the plane, allowing Harry to apprehend Helen and Vince, who are arrested. After rescuing Jennifer, Harry overhears Eliot attempting to free himself. Believing Harry has deduced his part in the kidnapping, and exasperated at his success, Eliot confesses and is also arrested.

Harry is appointed the new president of Crumb & Crumb, and P. J. thanks him for helping repair his relationship with Nikki. Harry is then presented with a new case: a murder at the Bottom's Up club in San Francisco.

== Cast ==
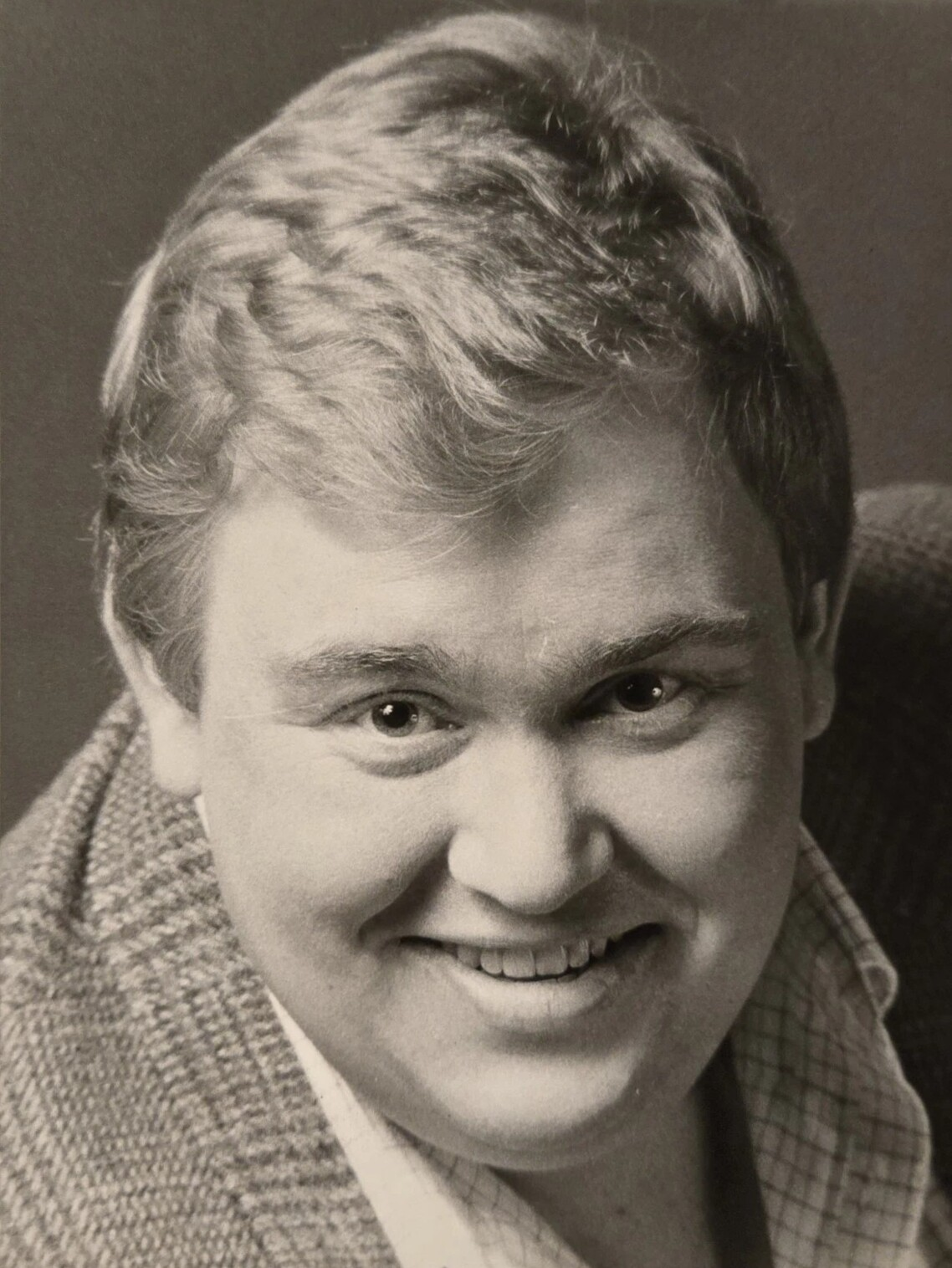
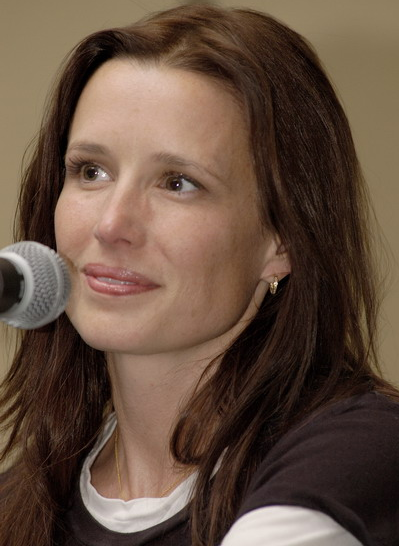
John Candy (pictured in 1982) and Shawnee Smith (2007)
- John Candy as Harry Crumb, a bumbling but determined private investigator
- Jeffrey Jones as Eliot Draisen, Harry's employer and mastermind behind a kidnapping
- Annie Potts as Helen Downing, P.J.'s greedy wife, who is having an affair with Vince
- Tim Thomerson as Vince Barnes, Helen's tennis instructor and lover
- Barry Corbin as P.J. Downing, a wealthy businessman and Jennifer and Nikki's father
- Shawnee Smith as Nikki Downing, Jennifer's overlooked younger sister
- Valri Bromfield as Detective Casey, a police detective investigating Jennifer's kidnapping
- Doug Steckler as Dwayne, Draisen's accomplice
- Renée Coleman as Jennifer Downing, P.J.'s model daughter
- Wesley Mann as Tim, the Downing's butler

Who's Harry Crumb? also features Tamsin Kelsey as Marie, Joe Flaherty as Doorman, Lori O'Byrne as Karen, Michele Goodger as Mrs. MacIntyre, Beverley Elliott as Joanne, P. Lynn Johnson as Kelly, Peter Yunker as Jeffrey Brandt, Garwin Sanford as Dennis Kimball, and Tony Dakota as Freddy. Manny Perry portrays a Cop in Car, Tino Insana appears as Smokey, Lyle Alzado as Man in Apartment, and Deanna Oliver as Woman in Apartment. Jim Belushi makes an uncredited cameo appearance as Man on Bus.

== Release ==
=== Box office ===
Who's Harry Crumb? was released in the United States and Canada on February 3, 1989. During its opening weekend it grossed a total of $3.9 million from 1,197 theaters—an average of $3,227 per theater—making it the fifth-highest grossing film of the weekend, behind Beaches ($4.2 million) in its seventh week of release, and ahead of Twins ($3.3 million) in its ninth. In its second weekend, Who's Harry Crumb? fell to the number 8 position with a $2.3 million gross—a 40.1% drop from the previous week—placing it behind Twins ($2.9 million) and ahead of the debuting Tap ($2.2 million). In total, Who's Harry Crumb? grossed $11 million, making it only the 84th-highest-grossing film of 1989.

The film was released in the United Kingdom on July 6, 1989, and failed to reach the Top 15.

=== Critical reception ===
Janet Maslin praised several of the performances in the film, including Candy's, but dismissed the film as a "weak comedy". Noting that Who's Harry Crumb? and The Naked Gun: From the Files of Police Squad! center on detectives who both feign wisdom while being oblivious, not to mention the same fish sight gag, Maslin concludes that Leslie Nielsen comes out the better in the comparison. On Rotten Tomatoes the film has an approval rating of 33% based on 12 reviews. On Metacritic it has a score of and 44% based on reviews from 10 critics. Audiences polled by CinemaScore gave the film a grade "C" on scale of A to F.

According to motion picture-historian Leonard Maltin, "Candy is ideally cast, but the film itself is uneven...With some very funny moments, but too much outright silliness."

In March 2018, Den of Geek included the film as one of "The Underrated Movies of 1989", commenting that it "isn't necessarily vintage Candy...it's still a lot of fun, and gives him a title role that he clearly enjoyed."
