= Thom Eberhardt =

American film producer

- Born: Thomas Everett Eberhardt; March 7, 1947 (age 79); Los Angeles, California, U.S.
- Years active: 1968–2007
- Awards: Festival du Film Policier de Cognac - Special Jury Prize; 1989 Without a Clue; Daytime Emmy; 2001 Ratz

Thomas Everett "Thom" Eberhardt (born March 7, 1947) is an American film director, producer and screenwriter. Eberhardt has won two awards and two nominations. He is most noted for his work on Without a Clue, Honey, I Blew Up the Kid, and the cult classic Night of the Comet. Eberhardt, formerly a member of Writers Guild of America West, left and maintained financial core status in 2008.

== Partial filmography ==
Year	Title	Director	Writer
1984	Sole Survivor	Yes	Yes
1984	Night of the Comet	Yes	Yes
1988	The Night Before	Yes	Yes
1988	Without a Clue	Yes	No
1989	Gross Anatomy	Yes	No
1991	All I Want for Christmas	No	Yes
1992	Honey, I Blew Up the Kid	No	Yes
1992	Captain Ron	Yes	Yes
2002	I Was a Teenage Faust	Yes	Yes
2007	Naked Fear	Yes	No

TV movies

- Twice Upon a Time (1998)
- Ratz (2000) (Also writer)
