= Michael Whaley =

American film and television actor

- Born: Michael Whaley; Long Beach, California, US
- Occupation: Actor
- Years active: 1989–present

Michael Whaley is an American film and television actor and director. He graduated from Culver City High School in 1980. Some of his most known characters are Dr. Wesley 'Wes' Hayes on Sisters, Det. Nathan Brubaker on Profiler, Detective Paul Armstrong on Early Edition, Bulldog's producer Pete on Frasier, and Detective Paul Bernstein on CSI: Miami.

He is the director of Fair Game (2006).

== Career ==
=== Actor ===
==== Movies ====
- Class Act (1992)
- Separate Lives (1995)
- Retiring Tatiana (2000)
- Fair Game (2005)
- The Santa Clause 2 (2002)
- Hoodlum & Son (2003)
- The Ant Bully (2006)
- Dude, I'm Moving Out (2009)
- 11:11 (2010)

==== Television movies ====
- Running Against Time (1990)
- Under Cover (1991)
- Boy Meets Girl (1993)
- Twice Upon a Time (1998)
- The Poseidon Adventure (2005)
- McBride: Semper Fi (2007)

==== Television ====
- A Different World (1989, 1 Episode)
- Midnight Caller (1990, 2 Episodes)
- Hunter (1990, 1 Episode)
- Gabriel's Fire (1991, 1 Episode)
- L.A. Law (1991, 1 Episode)
- I'll Fly Away (1992, 1 Episode)
- Grapevine (1992, 1 Episode)
- The Fresh Prince of Bel-Air (1992, 1 Episode)
- Living Single (1994, 1 Episode)
- Beverly Hills, 90210 (1995, 1 Episode)
- Sisters (1995–1996, 7 Episodes)
- Frasier (1995–1996, 2 Episodes)
- Profiler (1996–1997, 22 Episodes)
- Party of Five (1997, 1 Episode)
- Hangin' with Mr. Cooper (1997, 1 Episode)
- Vengeance Unlimited (1998, 1 Episode)
- ER (1998, 1 Episode)
- Any Day Now (1998, 2001, 2 Episodes)
- Sons of Thunder (1999, 1 Episode)
- Early Edition (1999–2000, 6 Episodes)
- JAG (2001, 2 Episodes)
- CSI: Miami (2002–2003, 7 Episodes)
- NCIS (2007, 1 Episode)
- House M.D. (2007, 1 Episode)
- The Philanthropist (2009, 1 Episode)
- The Event (2010, 2 Episodes)
- The Mentalist (2012, 1 Episode)
- American Horror Story: Roanoke (2016, 1 Episode)
- Criminal Minds (2017, 1 Episode)
- Scandal (2018, 1 Episode)
- 9-1-1 (2019, 2 Episodes)
- Two Degrees (2020, 1 Episode)

=== Directing ===
- Fair Game (2006)
- Peaches (2008)
- Applause for Miss E (2009)

=== Producer ===
- Fair Game (2006)
- Peaches (2008)
- Applause for Miss E (2009)

=== Writer ===
- Homicide: Life on the Street (1996, 1 Episode) (Teleplay and Story)
- Fair Game (2005)
