= Fair Game (2005 film) =

- DVD cover art
- Directed by: Michael Whaley
- Written by: J.M. Winters; Michael Whaley
- Produced by: Curtis Shaw; Jaki West; LaMonica Peters; Lia Smith; Michael Whaley; Robert Idavia; Steve Weisberg; T.C. Payton; Thomas Mueed; Tommy Burns; William White; Yeoman Elvan
- Starring: Christopher B. Duncan; Gina Torres; Kellita Smith; Michael Whaley; Mother Love
- Cinematography: Stephen Timberlake
- Edited by: Amber Pfeiffer
- Music by: Steven Barri Cohen
- Distributed by: UrbanWorks Entertainment
- Release date: February 12, 2005 (Pan-African Film Festival)
- Running time: 85 minutes
- Country: United States
- Language: English

Fair Game is a 2005 romantic comedy film, written and directed by Michael Whaley. Whaley also stars in the film, alongside Gina Torres.

== Plot ==
Michael (Whaley) and Stacey (Torres) are co-workers who can barely get along at the office. When Michael is suddenly thrust out of his home, the two are unexpectedly forced to become roommates. Though neither is particularly happy about the situation, they eventually learn to like each other, to the point where an undeniable attraction forms. However, another man enters Stacey's life right around the same time, complicating things even more than they were before.

== Cast ==
- Gina Torres as Stacey
- Michael Whaley as Michael
- Christopher B. Duncan as Marcus
- Kellita Smith as Cheryl
- LaTocha Scott as Vanessa
- Lia Smith as Fiona
- Mark Christopher Lawrence as Wesley
- Michael Jace as "E"
- Mother Love as Phyllis
- Terri Vaughn as Wanda

== Awards ==
- 2005 Motorcity International Film Festival – Best Soundtrack
- 2005 Pan African Film Festival – Blockbuster Video Audience Favorite
