= The Almost Guys =

- theatrical release poster
- Directed by: Eric Fleming
- Written by: Eric Fleming
- Produced by: Andrea Michaud
- Starring: Robert Culp; Eric Fleming; Shawnee Smith; James Edson; Oliver Davis
- Cinematography: Brian Hoodenpyle
- Edited by: Louis Cioffi
- Music by: Jim Latham
- Distributed by: National Lampoon
- Release dates: March 3, 2004 (US Comedy Arts Festival Aspen); June 1, 2006 (United States)
- Running time: 98 minutes
- Country: United States
- Language: English

The Almost Guys is a 2004 American comedy film written and directed by Eric Fleming, produced by Andrea Michaud and starring an ensemble cast. It was filmed on 35mm in Southern California. Film locations included Los Angeles, Lancaster, Long Beach, Upland and Downey. Worldwide rights to the independently produced film were acquired by National Lampoon.

== Plot ==
Rick Murphy and his 73-year-old partner known only as "The Colonel" work for a repossession company. During their latest repossession of a car, they find Jim Maxwell, a famous baseball pitcher, inside the trunk of the car. As it turns out, Rick and the Colonel repossessed the car of two members of the "Mob" who were in the middle of kidnapping Jim. As the World Series is only three days away, the repo men must get Jim back to his baseball team before the "Mob" catches up with them.

== Cast ==
- Robert Culp - The Colonel; Rick's 73-year-old partner.
- Eric Fleming - Rick Murphy; a luckless repo man and the protagonist.
- Shawnee Smith - Bigger; Jim's ex-girlfriend.
- James Edson - Jim Maxwell; a baseball pitcher.
- Oliver Davis - Buddy Murphy; Rick's son.
- Tae-Joon Lee - The Monk; a Korean man who had his car repossessed by Rick and the Colonel in the beginning of the movie.
- Lin Shaye - The Repo Boss; the boss of Re-Police, the repossession company Rick and the Colonel work for.
- Peter Allas - Massimo #1; one of the two members of the "Mob."
- Peter Arpesella - Massimo #2; one of the two members of the "Mob."
- Susan Egan - Suzanne Murphy; Rick's ex-wife.
- Tom Lenoci - Gentle Ben; a man who lives with Suzanne, much to Rick's chagrin.
- Satoshi Nakagawa - The Monk's Friend; a companion of the Monk who appears late in the movie.

== Release and critical reception ==
The film premiered in February, 2005 at the HBO Aspen Comedy film festival.

The Almost Guys screened at several film festivals, including HBO, Cinequest Film Festival, Sonoma Valley Film Festival, Boston Film Festival, Jacksonville Film Festival and Palm Beach International Film Festival. A limited US theatrical release followed in April, 2006.

The Almost Guys was chosen for an IFP New Film Works screening at the Pacific Design Center in Los Angeles.

The Almost Guys has received mixed to positive reviews from critics. Review aggregate Rotten Tomatoes reports that 60% of critics have given the film a positive review. Film Threat magazine awarded the film 4 stars. Colin Covert of the Minneapolis Star Tribune stated, "The Almost Guys is completely charming... Fleming brings a feeling of loose, lively fun to the story. He writes funny characters, funny dialogue and funny situations."
