= Twice Upon a Time (book series) =

Book series by Wendy Mass

Twice Upon A Time
- Official cover art for Rapunzel: The One with All the Hair
- Author: Wendy Mass
- Cover artist: Yaffa Jaskoll
- Country: United States
- Language: English
- Genre: Children's Fantasy
- Publisher: Scholastic Inc.
- Media type: Paperback, Hardcover, Kindle eBook, library binding
- No. of books: 3

Twice Upon A Time is a children's fiction series consisting of three books:

- Rapunzel: The One with All the Hair (#1)
- Sleeping Beauty: The One Who Took the Really Long Nap (#2)
- Beauty and the Beast: The Only One Who Didn't Run Away (#3)

The stories are told in alternating perspectives of two main characters. The cover photographer is Michael Frost. The novel is recommended for ages 8–12 (grades 3-7).

== Rapunzel: The One with All the Hair ==
ISBN 0439796563

ISBN 978-0-439-79659-0

The novel was published on June 1, 2014. It is 208 pages.

=== Plot ===
Rapunzel was in deep trouble. She was recently held prisoner by a witch as the result of a deal her parents made when she was born.

Prince Benjamin craved to have a grand adventure travelling minstrels would compose songs about. His mother, however, was overly protective and watched him “like a hawk”.

When the story began, Prince Benjamin was fetched for supper by his best friend Andrew. He was distressed to sit beside Prince Elkin, his “ever-bothersome, frog like” cousin.

Meanwhile, Rapunzel has been weeping. She was hungry, aching, and homesick.

The next day, Rapunzel woke to discover a little orange kitten on her feet. She named her Sir Kitty. When the witch appeared, Rapunzel threatened that her parents would find her soon. The witch laughed and told her she was far from any village.

At the same time, Prince Benjamin was wandering far from the castle. His glasses fell and broke. He stumbled around until a boy approached him and brought him to his house. The boy's father mended his spectacles as if it were never broken. In conversation, Prince Benjamin discovered that all the boys born the three years following his birth were also named Benjamin. He also found although the boy's father was excellent at making spectacles, he had to clean dung chutes for a stable income.

At late night, Andrew and Benjamin were furtively eating plum cakes in the kitchen. Benjamin admitted he wished for a way to prove himself and help the spectacle maker to work in his dream career. Andrew told him about a treasure cave in the Great Forest. A large, hairy troll guarded the entrance, so not even the bravest knights dared to approach it. If the prince defeated the troll, he could give the treasure to the spectacle maker.

The next day, Prince Benjamin discovered that Elkin was back for training to be a prince.

After a failed attempt at climbing down the tower, Rapunzel found a way to escape by looking into the mirror to see behind her when the witch was leaving. She found a trapdoor in the ceiling.

Later that day, Rapunzel discovered to her disappointment that she could not reach the trapdoor. However, she kept the mirror with her at all times. Using the mirror, she watched a person with green skin climb down the rope and drop off her dinner. She realized it was not the witch who brought her small gifts in her time trapped; it was the green creature. She wrote a letter to thank him for his kindness.

The next day, Prince Benjamin was given a map of the Great Forest and a book on trolls by Andrew. He was also notified by Elkin of his first hunt in six days. He learned that trolls were fatally allergic to tomatoes. When the hunting party splits up, he would ride off to the cave.

Meanwhile, Rapunzel's hair kept growing longer. In her dinner vegetable stew, she discovered seven peas on top forming a happy face.

Rapunzel woke up hours before dawn. She heard heaving sobs even though she was not crying. She discovered a round green face staring up at her. The creature introduced himself as Steven. Steven was in debt to the witch for saving his son when he suddenly could not breathe. The witch was the only person around, and she mumbled an incantation. A large bug flew out of Steven's son's throat. Steven asked what he could do to repay the witch, and the witch told him she needed a cook and guard. Therefore, Steven was stuck in the tower forever. If he leaves, his son would die.

Meanwhile, Benjamin was called by his father to go over the rules of the hunt. As per tradition, he was forced to ride with Elkin. Andrew thought it would be best to tell Elkin about the plans to go to the cave.

The next day, Rapunzel began to sing to keep her mind off the situation. She suddenly understood how to break the witch's bond with Steven.

Another day later, the hunting day came for Benjamin. He told Elkin his plans. Elkin was ecstatic to find the treasure cave and escape from hunting—a reaction Benjamin did not expect.

On the same day, Rapunzel explained her thinking to Steven: the bug that flew out of his son's mouth was controlled by the witch. The witch scared everyone else away so she was the only one around. Steven was not in debt at all. On the other hand, Rapunzel's mother was also bewitched when she made the deal.

Steven and Rapunzel tried to escape the tower, but encountered the witch. Steven ran away, urged by Rapunzel. The witch dragged her up the stairs and tossed her trunk. The trapdoor was locked thereon, and Rapunzel was truly trapped.

Meanwhile, Prince Benjamin and Elkin were searching for the cave. After a while, they found the cave, but they discovered the guard was not a troll, but an old hermit. Later that day, the witch visited Rapunzel. She asked her to let down her hair so she could climb up. Rapunzel discovered she was tricked. The witch had not brought her food, but a few branches. After the witch left, Rapunzel began singing again to release her stress.

Meanwhile, Benjamin and Elkin were talking to the hermit. They discovered the treasure cave was merely a rumor to keep visitors away. Benjamin confessed to the hermit that he had been expecting to give the treasure to a villager. The hermit told him there were other ways to help the villager, and someone would be singing for him. When Benjamin left the cave, he got lost in the forest. However, he heard a girl singing.

The horn signifying the end of the hunt was blown. Benjamin had to come back the next day to find the girl. Elkin shot some arrows onto nearby trees and dumped the rest on the ground to indicate the spot the singing was heard. Guided by the horses, the boys rejoined the hunting party.

The next day, Benjamin rode off early to find the singing girl. Guided by his horse, he soon found a tall tower. He discovered a strange woman asking the girl to let down her hair, and did the same after the woman left.

Rapunzel told Benjamin her story. Benjamin agreed to find silk to make a ladder so she could escape. Rapunzel found herself smiling long after the prince was gone. When Benjamin returned to the castle, he told Andrew and Elkin about Rapunzel. They stole silk from the seamstress's workroom at night. However, the next day, Benjamin found there was not enough silk.

After Benjamin left to get more silk, every minute seemed like an hour for Rapunzel. When the witch finally visited, Rapunzel blurted that she was slow like the prince. The witch was infuriated. She cut Rapunzel's hair and slid down the hair ladder with her. Rapunzel felt angry at herself for blurting out and for not cutting off the braid to escape earlier. The witch tossed Rapunzel into a ring of tall bushes and took off. Rapunzel did the only thing she could: sing.

Benjamin soon reached the tower. However, when he climbed up, he only encountered the furious witch. He was struck to the wall and tossed out the tower. Fortunately, his horse softened his fall. His glasses were broken, and he had no choice but to trust his horse.

Benjamin's horse trudged further and further into the forest until it was dusk. He heard Rapunzel singing again: the horse had led him to her. After tossing the cloak over the bushes so Rapunzel would not be scraped by the prickles, Benjamin was given a pair of glasses. Apparently, he left them in the tower. Rapunzel suggested he hire a full-time spectacle maker. Benjamin was immediately inspired to hire the villager.

Benjamin and Rapunzel finally returned to the castle at midnight. Elkin had told Benjamin's mother and father about Rapunzel. The castle guards had trapped the witch inside the tower.

In the morning, Benjamin woke to the singing of fifty boys who were his namesakes. They were singing a song about the prince. Benjamin's dream was achieved. Rapunzel's parents arrived as she was eating breakfast. The hermit and Steven arrived soon after. The hermit revealed that Steven bolted past his cave just before Benjamin and Elkin visited. The hermit promised Steven he would find help for Rapunzel.

== Sleeping Beauty: The One Who Took the Really Long Nap ==
ISBN 043979658X

ISBN 978-0-439-79658-3

The novel was published on April 1, 2012. It is 176 pages.

=== Plot ===
Princess Rose was cursed by a fairy at her christening ceremony. She would slumber for a century after being pierced by a spindle.

The Prince's mother was an ogre. She banned all beautiful objects and people from the castle, and sought blood on the second and fourth Thursdays of a month. Everything in the castle was dusted and turned dull.

Princess Rose was constantly supervised and avoided all pointy objects. On her eighth birthday, she invited four girls, including a girl from town called Sara. All the girls except Sara were displeased by the constant supervision of the ladies-in-waiting.

A few weeks after Rose's birthday, Sara's mother moved her family to another part of town with a blacksmith and his five children in a tiny house. Rose wanted Sara to stay in the castle. She became her new lady-in-waiting.

Meanwhile, a hundred years later, the Prince's new page, Jonathan, taught the Prince how to survive in the wild, since he ran away often. When he first ran away, he glimpsed a familiar building on the castle grounds, hidden by vines.

When the Prince was fourteen, he discovered a small separation of the vines over a window of the mysterious building. He saw a castle library that looked exactly like the one in his castle. The Prince wanted to discuss this with Jonathan, but found that he went to be a squire.

The Prince was devastated. He spent nearly a month in the forest. When he returned home, he was told he was in charge, since his father and mother had gone to a meeting. The Prince saw this as an opportunity to learn more about the history of the castle, so he invited the oldest people in the kingdom and neighboring towns for tea. During teatime, he discovered that his castle used to be a field, and the old castle used to be farther away. One day, the castle spontaneously relocated. It moved just less than a hundred years ago, right after Princess Rose disappeared.

When Princess Rose was sixteen, she visited her cousins. She wandered around and found an old woman. She saw a sewing machine for the first time, and was amazed at her natural talent. She was just being passed a spindle as her parents and Sara arrived, but then, it was too late.

After he learned about the castle's history, the Prince dreamed of a fairy handing him a book. He searched for it in the library when he woke. Inside the book was a pamphlet about the story of a fairy who saved Princess Rose. The truth dawned on the Prince.

The night before the Prince's sixteenth birthday, he could not sleep. He stared at the mermaid fountain outside the castle. Suddenly, for a split second, it came alive. He checked on his hidden rosebush. One rose was blooming in the patch even though it is nighttime. He realized the next day marked a hundred years after the princess was put to sleep.

In the morning of the Prince's sixteenth birthday, he arrived at the door of the castle. The vines parted. He kissed the princess and awakened her. However, the princess was horrified that everyone she loved and knew was dead.

The Prince and princess walked through the gardens. They discovered that the princess could not walk past an invisible wall around the old castle grounds. When they returned to the old castle, Princess Rose found Sara waiting for her. Sara had requested to sleep along with Rose and wake when she woke.

The Prince returned to his castle to take care of things at home. He was worried that since Princess Rose was beautiful, his part-ogre mother would not accept her. Rose might also abandon him if she knew about his mother.

When the Prince returned home, he was on constant supervision. His enemy, Percival, told his father that he was imagining things. He could not return to Princess Rose on time.

The Prince sought help from the falconer. He told him the story. The falconer offered to cause a distraction that would divert the guards’ attention that night. At dinner, the Prince encountered a fairy, who told him that the princess could not leave the old castle grounds until his parents have accepted her.

The falconer's diversion worked. However, the Prince was spotted. He ran to the old castle, hid with Rose and Sara, and locked the room door. The Prince told Rose about his mother, and Rose chose to rub dirt on her face and cut her hair haphazardly.

The Prince's mother was happy at the Prince's choice for a mate. Suddenly, the colors of the old castle faded. The two castles had merged into one.

The Prince and Princess Rose lived happily ever after.

== Beauty and the Beast: The Only One Who Didn't Run Away ==
ISBN 0545310199

ISBN 978-0-545-31019-2

The novel was published on April 30, 2013. It is 288 pages. Its Lexile rating is 760L.

=== Summary ===
Beauty finds her older sister to be perfect and more deserving of the name "Beauty."

Meanwhile, the prince finds he is expected to be athletic, commanding, brave, and tall. But the prince's only interests are: bagpipes, which he plays poorly, studying the stars, and trying to figure out how to make worms live forever.

When Beauty's life turns upside down and she's forced to head out into the world, she has to figure out just who she wants to be, and when Prince Riley suddenly grows fur and sharp nails, he has to learn that a beast's appearance can be deceiving.

== Reception ==
=== Rapunzel: The One with All the Hair ===
Rapunzel: The One with All the Hair has received editorial reviews from both Barnes & Noble and Janice DeLong. Barnes & Noble praised it as "a fresh take on an age-old fairy tale". Janice DeLong commented that the novel has a "most satisfactory resolution", and praised that it "fairly sparkles with contemporary attitude and humor".

=== Sleeping Beauty: The One Who Took the Really Long Nap ===
Sleeping Beauty: The One Who Took the Really Long Nap has received an editorial review from Kathryn Erskine. She described the novel as "hysterically funny" and "fantastically fun". She praised the writing as "upbeat, breezy, and clever", and claimed the author did a "superb job". She recommended the novel to "both young and young-at-heart readers".

=== Beauty and the Beast: The Only One Who Didn't Run Away ===
Beauty and the Beast: The Only One Who Didn't Run Away has received editorial reviews from both the School Library Journal and Kirkus Reviews. The School Library Journal recommended the novel for grades 4-7. SLJ criticized the dialogue, claiming it "doesn't sound authentic and seems pieced together with little or no transition". SLJ also disapproved of the pacing, stating the events "all seem random and do little to enhance the plot". It claimed the novel leaves some to "wonder what took so long", since the traditional story begins at "about 70 pages from the end". The reviewer concluded with a lighter note, saying the book is "still...popular with tweens", and recommended it to "librarians looking for light, nonviolent retellings".

Kirkus Reviews began with commenting that the story is "reasonably charming" and "has little bite". Later, it criticized that "the story takes a long time to get started", and "the connections between the first half and the second half of the story don't always adhere". Kirkus stated that the plot is "all so clean and lighthearted and safe that readers accustomed to any edge at all might find their teeth aching". The reviewer also described the novel as a "squeaky-clean read".
