= Shawnee Smith =

American actress (born 1969)

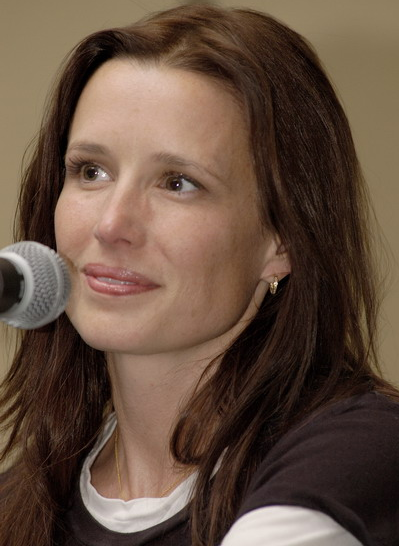
- Smith in 2007
- Born: July 3, 1969 (age 57); Orangeburg, South Carolina, U.S.
- Occupations: Actress; singer
- Years active: 1977–present
- Spouse(s): Jason Reposar (divorced); Kai Mattoon (divorced)
- Children: 2

Shawnee Smith (born July 3, 1969) is an American actress and singer. She began her acting career at a young age, making her feature film debut in Annie (1982). A few years later, she made her stage debut in To Gillian on Her 37th Birthday (1984) and won a Drama-League Critics Award. In the late 1980s, she was cast in smaller roles before getting roles in The Blob (1988) and Who's Harry Crumb? (1989).

She made guest appearances on Murder, She Wrote and The X-Files across the 1990s, before being cast in a main role of the sitcom Becker (1998–2004). She played Amanda Young in Saw (2004) and reprised her role in the sequels Saw II (2005), Saw III (2006), Saw VI (2009) and Saw X (2023). She also had a supporting role in The Grudge 3 (2009). Smith hosted season one of the VH1 acting competition Scream Queens (2008) and played Jennifer Goodson in Anger Management (2012–2014).

== Early life ==
Smith was born on July 3, 1969, at Orangeburg Regional Hospital in Orangeburg, South Carolina. She is the second child of Patricia Ann (née Smoak), an oncology nurse, and James H. Smith, a financial planner and former US Air Force pilot. When she was five months old, her family relocated from South Carolina to West Los Angeles, California. Her parents divorced when she was two years old and her mother remarried five years later when they moved to the San Fernando Valley.

== Career ==
=== 1980s ===
In 1977, Smith made her television debut in a McDonald's commercial at age eight. At age 11, she made her feature film debut in John Huston's 1982 adaptation of the Broadway musical Annie, as one of Annie Bennett Warbucks's fellow orphans. The next year, she sang on The Merv Griffin Show. At age 15, Smith won her first stage role in the Los Angeles play, To Gillian on Her 37th Birthday where co-star Richard Dreyfuss noticed in rehearsals her potential and suggested she be given a leading part. She went on to win the Drama-League Critics Award for her performance.

In 1985, she had small parts in, Not My Kid, Cagney & Lacey and Iron Eagle (1986). In 1987, Smith played a pregnant student Rhonda in Summer School. The following year, her first starring role came with the remake of The Blob. In 1988, Smith starred in television film I Saw What You Did.

Smith had a supporting role alongside John Candy and Annie Potts in the 1989 film Who's Harry Crumb?, where Smith plays a teen who helps Harry Crumb locate her kidnapped sister. That same year, she co-starred with Jennie Garth and Barbara Eden in the short-lived TV series Brand New Life.

=== 1990s ===
The following year, she co-starred in Michael Cimino's remake of the thriller Desperate Hours. She took a three-year break from acting in the early 1990s, primarily because she had outgrown teenage roles and had a hard time finding work. She made a guest appearance on the 200th episode of Murder, She Wrote in 1993. That following year, she played Julie Lawry in the television miniseries The Stand, based on the novel by Stephen King. Smith made a guest appearance in the 1994 The X-Files episode "Firewalker", playing Jessie O'Neil.

In 1998, Smith was cast as Linda in CBS's sitcom Becker, playing the office's aide to Dr. John Becker (Ted Danson). After airing three episodes to high ratings, CBS ordered a full season. She was a main character for all six seasons until its cancellation in 2004.

=== 2000s ===
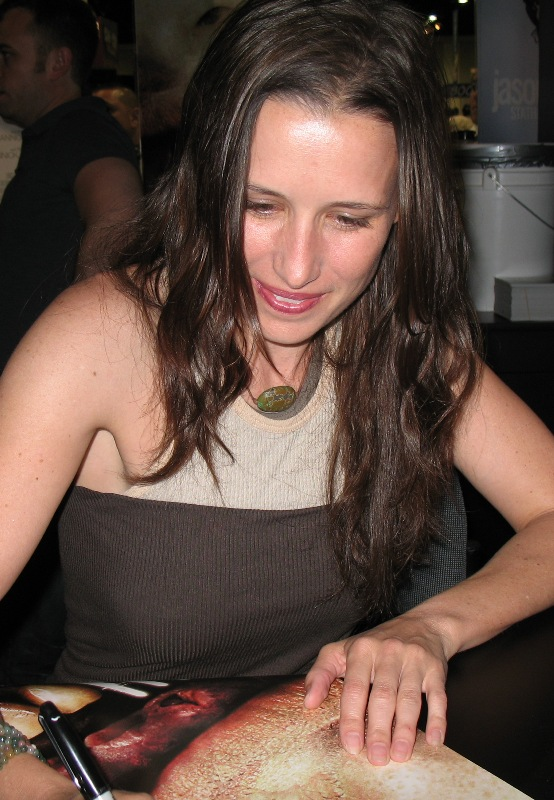
Smith promoting Saw III at the 2006 San Diego Comic-Con

In 2003, she lent her voice to an episode of the Disney cartoon Kim Possible as Vivian Porter. Also in 2003, she was cast in James Wan's low budget horror film, Saw, as Amanda Young. A small part, opposite Tobin Bell, she filmed her scene within one day and while battling the flu. While initially a direct-to-video release was planned, test screenings in March 2004 turned out positive prompting Lionsgate to release it theatrically that October. It became a box office success, grossing $103 million worldwide. She would reprise her role in Saw II (2005), Saw III (2006), Saw VI (2009), and Saw X (2023). The Saw franchise went on to become one of the highest-grossing horror franchises of all time, grossing over $1 billion worldwide, as of 2021.

Smith began working on a solo album in 2004 with producer Chris Goss, but the project was never completed. In an interview with Radio Free in October 2005, she stated, "between being a mom, and working, and growing another baby, I have not had time to give attention to music for a while." Smith contributed to the soundtrack of Saw III in 2006 with vocals on Hydrovibe's song "Killer Inside", and to the soundtrack for Catacombs as a solo vocalist with the song "Please Myself".

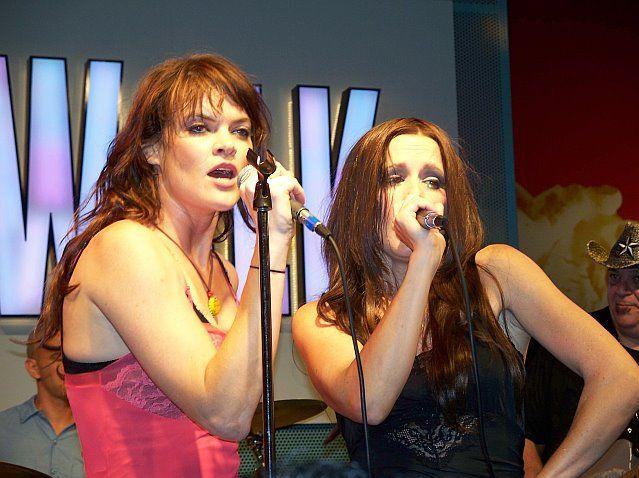
Smith (right) with Missi Pyle (left), performing as Smith & Pyle in 2008

In 2006, Smith made an appearance in the 10-minute short film trailer Repo! The Genetic Opera, directed by Bousman. The trailer was filmed after completing Saw III to try to pitch the idea to film producers. In 2007, she was part of a country rock music group with actress Missi Pyle called Smith & Pyle. Their first album, It's OK to Be Happy, was released digitally through iTunes and Amazon.com in 2008.

In 2008, Smith played Detective Gina Harcourt in the FEARnet original series 30 Days of Night: Dust to Dust and also served as executive producer. It premiered in July 17 with six webisodes. Smith was the host and one of three mentors on the VH1 reality television series, Scream Queens, which aired from October 2008 to December 2008. Smith did not return for the second season due to scheduling conflicts and was replaced with Jaime King.

Smith played the role of Dr. Sullivan, child psychiatrist, in The Grudge 3 that was released direct-to-video on May 12, 2009.

=== 2010s ===
Smith appeared in the series premiere of Law & Order: Los Angeles titled, "Hollywood", on September 29, 2010. In 2012, she had her first voice role in a video game, Lollipop Chainsaw. From 2012 to 2014, Smith starred as Jennifer Goodson, the ex-wife of Charlie Sheen's character in the TV series Anger Management.

She provided vocals on a cover of Steve Miller Band's "Abracadabra" by Eagles of Death Metal after Jesse Hughes overheard her singing the song in a studio bathroom. This cover was released in 2019.

=== 2020s ===
Smith co-starred with Dean Winters in the 2021 indie comedy film Christmas vs. the Walters. Smith reprised her role as Amanda Young in Saw X released in September 2023. She appeared in the slasher film Bloodline Killer in April 2024.

== Personal life ==
Smith was married to photographer Jason Reposar. They have a daughter, who was born in 1999. She was later married to musician Kai Mattoon; they divorced and have a son, born in 2005. Smith is a convert to Eastern Orthodoxy Christianity.

== Filmography ==
=== Film ===
List of films and roles
| Year | Title | Role | Notes | Ref. |
|---|---|---|---|---|
| 1982 | Annie | Background dancer | | |
| 1986 | Iron Eagle | Joenie | | |
| 1987 | Summer School | Rhonda Altobello | | |
| 1988 | The Blob | Megan "Meg" Penny | | |
| 1989 | Who's Harry Crumb? | Nikki Downing | | |
| 1990 | Desperate Hours | May Cornell | | |
| 1995 | Leaving Las Vegas | Biker girl | Cameo appearance | |
| 1995 | The Low Life | "Little Tramp" Woman | Cameo appearance | |
| 1996 | Female Perversions | Make-up Salesgirl | Cameo appearance | |
| 1997 | Dead Men Can't Dance | Sgt. Addy Cooper | | |
| 1997 | Greater Than a Tiger | Alice | Short film | |
| 1997 | Men | Clara | | |
| 1997 | Dogtown | Tammy Hayes | | |
| 1997 | Bombshell | Shelly | | |
| 1997 | Eat Your Heart Out | Nicole | | |
| 1998 | Every Dog Has Its Day | Redhead | Cameo appearance | |
| 1998 | Armageddon | Redhead | Cameo appearance | |
| 1998 | Carnival of Souls | Sandra Grant | | |
| 1998 | The Party Crashers | Carolyn | | |
| 1999 | A Slipping-Down Life | Faye-Jean Lindsay | | |
| 1999 | Breakfast of Champions | Bonnie MacMahon | | |
| 2002 | Never Get Outta the Boat | Dawn | | |
| 2004 | Saw | Amanda Young | | |
| 2004 | The Almost Guys | Bigger | | |
| 2005 | The Island | Suzie | | |
| 2005 | Saw II | Amanda Young | | |
| 2006 | Saw III | Amanda Young | | |
| 2006 | Repo! The Genetic Opera | Heather | Short film | |
| 2009 | The Grudge 3 | Dr. Francine Sullivan | Direct-to-video film | |
| 2009 | Saw VI | Amanda Young | | |
| 2010 | Kill Speed | Honey | Uncredited role; direct-to-video film | |
| 2012 | Jayne Mansfield's Car | Vicky Caldwell | | |
| 2013 | Grace Unplugged | Michelle Trey | | |
| 2016 | Savannah Sunrise | Joy | | |
| 2016 | Believe | Dr. Nancy Wells | | |
| 2021 | Christmas vs. the Walters | Diane Walters | Also producer | |
| 2023 | Saw X | Amanda Young | | |
| 2024 | Bloodline Killer | Moira Cole | Also producer | |
| 2025 | The Other | Lizzie | | |
| TBA | Slay | Jenna | Post-production | |

=== Television ===
List of television appearances and roles
| Year | Title | Role | Notes | Ref. |
|---|---|---|---|---|
| 1984 | Silver Spoons | Tawny | Episode: "Growing Pains: Part 1" | |
| 1985 | Not My Kid | Carol | Television film | |
| 1985 | It's Your Move | Brenda | Episode: "The Experts" | |
| 1985 | Cagney & Lacey | Mrs. Zal's daughter | Episode: "The Psychic" | |
| 1985 | Crime of Innocence | Jodi Hayward | Television film | |
| 1986 | All Is Forgiven | Sonia Russell | Main role; 9 episodes | |
| 1986 | Easy Prey | Tina Marie Risico | Television film | |
| 1988 | Bluegrass | Alice Gibbs | Television film | |
| 1988 | I Saw What You Did | Kim Fielding | Television film | |
| 1989–1990 | Brand New Life | Amanda Gibbons | Main role; 6 episodes | |
| 1990 | Lucky Chances | Olympia Stanislopolous Golden | Miniseries; 3 episodes | |
| 1993 | Murder, She Wrote | Jill Cleveland | Episode: "Bloodlines" | |
| 1994 | The Stand | Julie Lawry | Miniseries; 2 episodes | |
| 1994 | The X-Files | Jessie O'Neil | Episode: "Firewalker" | |
| 1996 | Face of Evil | Jeanelle Polk | Television film | |
| 1997 | Something Borrowed, Something Blue | Teri | Television film | |
| 1997 | Arsenio | Laura Lauman | Main role; 6 episodes | |
| 1997 | The Shining | Waitress | Miniseries; Episode 3 | |
| 1997–1998 | The Tom Show | Florence Madison | Main role; 19 episodes | |
| 1998 | Players | Lila | Episode: "Confidence Man" | |
| 1998 | Twice Upon a Time | Maggie Fowler | Television film | |
| 1998–2004 | Becker | Linda | Main role; 129 episodes | |
| 2003 | Kim Possible | Vivian Porter | Voice role; Episode: "Grudge Match" | |
| 2005 | Washington Street | Unknown role | Television film | |
| 2007 | Traveling in Packs | Ivy | Unsold television pilot | |
| 2007 | Secrets of an Undercover Wife | Lisa Wilder-Crews | Television film | |
| 2008 | 30 Days of Night: Dust to Dust | Detective Gina Harcourt | Miniseries; 5 episodes (also executive producer) | |
| 2008 | Scream Queens | Herself | Host and mentor; 8 episodes | |
| 2010–2011 | The Secret Life of the American Teenager | Carrie | Episodes: "Up All Night" & "Young at Heart" | |
| 2010 | Law & Order: Los Angeles | Trudy Sennett | Episode: "Hollywood" | |
| 2012 | Reel America | Lisa Slotnik | Television film | |
| 2012–2014 | Anger Management | Jennifer Goodson | Main role; 61 episodes | |
| 2023 | City on Fire | Ramona | Recurring role; 4 episodes | |

=== Video games ===
List of video game appearances and roles
| Year | Title | Role | Notes | Ref. |
|---|---|---|---|---|
| 2002 | Grand Theft Auto: Vice City | Fever 105 Female Imaging | | |
| 2012 | Lollipop Chainsaw | Mariska | English dub | |
| 2024 | Lollipop Chainsaw RePOP | Mariska | Remastered version of Lollipop Chainsaw | |
| 2025 | Tormentor | Bloody Mary | | |
