= Timpanogos Storytelling Festival =

American storytelling event

Coordinates: 40°19′29″N 111°38′45″W

The Timpanogos Storytelling Festival is an annual storytelling event held in Lehi, Utah, on the weekend after Labor Day. The event typically lasts three days and features professional storytellers from across the country. In addition to daytime performances on Friday and Saturday, there are usually themed evening performances such as Look Who's Talking, Bedtime Stories, My Favorite Stories, and Laughin' Night.

== Festival origins ==
In 1989, Karen Jackman Ashton, President of the Friends of the Orem Public Library, wanted to find new ways to get people involved in the library. Ashton had been presenting Storytime for preschoolers and helping with other Children's Library programs. She attended the National Storytelling Festival in Tennessee and found thousands of adults crowding into tents, listening to dynamic performers relating tales of history, culture, folk, and family life. The entire town of Jonesborough (population of 3,000) had mobilized to accommodate the 10,000+ people who annually attend the three-day festival. The first Timpanogos Storytelling Festival was organized eight months after Ashton identified an idea at a storytelling festival. It was held at the Ashton family property and nearby locations and featured regional storytellers. In its second year, the festival expanded its schedule and venues, added an evening performance at the Scera Theater, introduced school performances, and included nationally recognized storytellers selected alongside regional performers through auditions.

== Expansion and growth ==
The Timpanogos Storytelling Festival has grown in size since its first year and received recognition from Storytelling organizations.

In 1999, the National Storytelling Network honored Ashton with the Regional Service & Leadership Award. In the same year, the Utah Storytelling Guild (spawned by the festival and now supporting the festival) received the National Storytelling Network Service Award. Janet Low, Festival Coordinator, was awarded the Service Award in 2000, and Debi Richan, Festival Vice-president, received this national award in 2004.

In 2005, the festival opened at the new Mt. Timpanogos Park in Provo Canyon. Designed by the City of Orem for the annual festival, the park allows festival growth to continue with more and larger performance tents.

The Timpanogos Storytelling Festival has been supported with volunteer work and donations from individuals and community groups such as the American Legion, Kiwanis, Golden Kiwanis, youth groups, student clubs, the Boy Scouts and Girl Scouts, and the Utah Storytelling Guild.

In 2017, the festival moved locations to Thanksgiving Point's Ashton Gardens. A virtual festival was held in 2020 because of the COVID-19 pandemic.
