= Missi Pyle =

American actress and singer (born 1972)

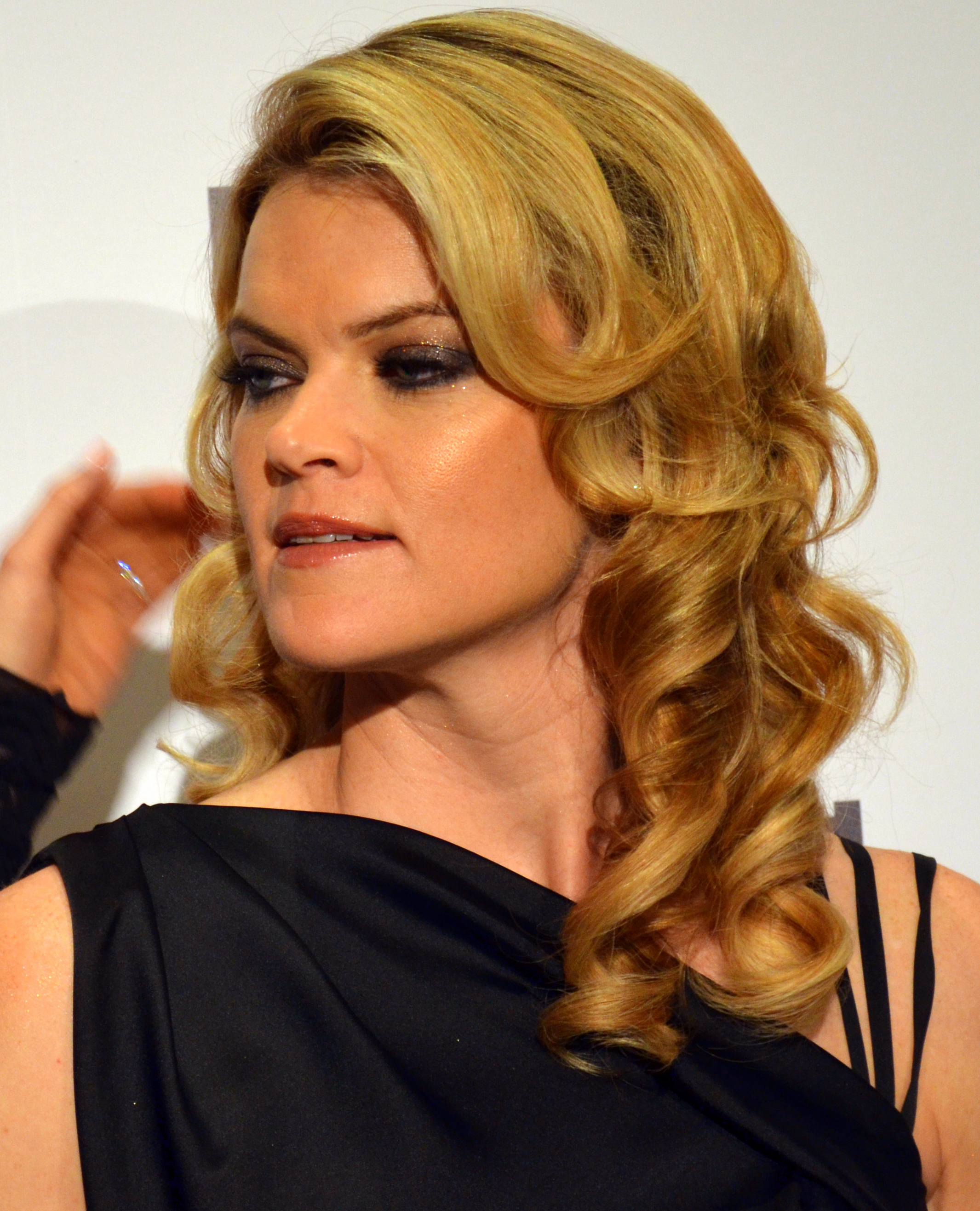
- Pyle at the 2012 ACE Eddie Awards in Beverly Hills, California
- Born: Andrea Kay Pyle; November 16, 1972 (age 53); Houston, Texas, U.S.
- Education: University of North Carolina School of the Arts (BFA)
- Occupations: Actress; singer
- Years active: 1995–present
- Height: 5 ft 11 in (1.82 m)
- Spouses: Antonio Sacre (m. 2000; div. 2005) Casey Anderson (m. 2008; div. 2012)
- Children: 1
- Musical career
- Genre: Country
- Instrument: Vocals
- Label: Urban Prairie Records
- Formerly of: Smith & Pyle

Andrea Kay "Missi" Pyle (born November 16, 1972) is an American actress and singer. She has appeared in films such as Galaxy Quest (1999), Josie and the Pussycats (2001), Home Alone 4 (2002), Bringing Down the House (2003), Dodgeball: A True Underdog Story (2004), Charlie and the Chocolate Factory (2005), Harold & Kumar Escape from Guantanamo Bay (2008), The Artist (2011), Gone Girl (2014), Captain Fantastic (2016), and Ma (2019). Pyle has also appeared in television series including Two and a Half Men (2004-2015), The Mentalist (2010), Cleaners (2013–2014), Jennifer Falls (2014), Another Period (2015–2018), Bordertown (2016), The Soul Man (2016), Mom (2017), Impulse (2018–2019), and Dirty John (2020). As a singer, with actress Shawnee Smith, Pyle is half of Smith & Pyle, a country rock duo.

== Early life and education ==
Pyle was born on November 16, 1972, in Houston, Texas, to Linda and Frank Pyle. She was raised in Tennessee. She graduated from the School of Drama at the University of North Carolina School of the Arts in 1995. She also studied drama at the Oxford School of Drama.

== Career ==
Pyle played a waitress in 1997's As Good as It Gets. Circa 2001, Pyle and Christina Moore performed with Bitches Funny, an all-female Los Angeles-based sketch comedy ensemble.

Pyle has guest starred on many television shows, including Heroes, Mad About You, Boston Legal, Frasier, The Sarah Silverman Program, and 2 Broke Girls. She started her film career with a minor role in As Good as It Gets, starring Helen Hunt and Jack Nicholson. After her breakout role in Galaxy Quest, Pyle had supporting roles in Bringing Down the House (for which she and Queen Latifah were nominated for an MTV Movie Award for Best Fight), Josie and the Pussycats, Home Alone 4, Exposed, Big Fish, Along Came Polly, Soul Plane, Stormbreaker, and Charlie and the Chocolate Factory. She was the female lead in BachelorMan and appears in Dodgeball: A True Underdog Story. Pyle had a brief appearance in 50 First Dates and starred in A Cinderella Story: Once Upon a Song.

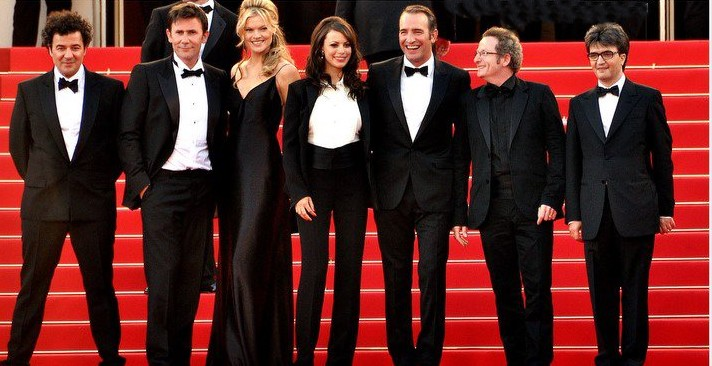
Selected cast and crew of The Artist at the 2011 Cannes Film Festival; (left to right) Ludovic Bource (composer), Michel Hazanavicius (director), Missi Pyle (actress), Bérénice Bejo (actress), Jean Dujardin (actor), Guillaume Schiffman (cinematographer), and Thomas Langmann (producer)

Pyle played Jake's elementary school teacher Ms. Pasternak on Two and a Half Men. However, the role was recast in 2009 for undisclosed reasons. Pyle returned to the series in the same role in 2011 and again in the series finale "Of Course He's Dead" in 2015.

In 2008, Pyle starred in the Broadway play Boeing-Boeing opposite Christine Baranski, Mark Rylance, Greg Germann, Paige Davis and Rebecca Gayheart. The play closed in January 2009.

Pyle was scheduled to ring the closing bell for the trading day at the New York Stock Exchange on September 29, 2008, to promote Boeing-Boeing, but backed out minutes before the close of trading so as not to associate herself with ending a calamitous day of financial turmoil which resulted in the Dow Jones Industrial Average losing 778 points, the largest point loss ever in a session during the 2008 financial crisis. She watched from the floor as an NYSE staffer pushed the button and gaveled the end of trading instead.

Pyle was part of a country music group with actress Shawnee Smith called Smith & Pyle. They met while filming an ABC comedy pilot titled Traveling in Packs. The band started after Smith invited Pyle to join her in attending the Coachella Valley Music and Arts Festival. While stuck in traffic, Pyle talked about her dream to be a rock star and Smith agreed to form a band with her. Their first album, "It's OK to Be Happy", was released digitally through iTunes and Amazon.com in July 2008. The debut album was recorded in Joshua Tree, California at Rancho De La Luna and was produced by Chris Goss. The two actresses have also become business partners and formed their own record label called Urban Prairie Records, under which "It's OK to be Happy" was released. According to an interview Smith did with pretty-scary.net in August 2008, a Smith & Pyle television or webisode series might be in the works. Smith also mentioned the idea of a series on Fangoria radio with Dee Snider. Currently there are three videos posted on YouTube that show the making of the record. They also have a 10-minute "making of" video on Vimeo called Smith & Pyle: Desert Sessions.

== Personal life ==
Pyle married Antonio Sacre, in May 2000. Pyle married wildlife naturalist Casey Anderson on September 12, 2008. The wedding was country-western themed and took place in Montana. Wedding guests included bandmate Shawnee Smith and comedian Steve Agee. Anderson's pet grizzly bear, Brutus, served as his best man in the ceremony. Pyle and Anderson appeared in "Grizzly Dogs", the October 22, 2010, episode of Dog Whisperer, in which they sought the help of Cesar Millan to rehabilitate their dog. Pyle confirmed their breakup in 2013. She has a daughter, Zooey. In 2026 she publicly came out as queer while on the Shut Up Evan podcast, stating that she is “cool with whatever gender” and that she is now “looking for a person or persons”.

== Filmography ==
=== Film ===
Year	Title	Role	Notes
1997	As Good as It Gets	Waitress	
1999	Trick	Actress	
1999	Galaxy Quest	Laliari	
1999	Let It Snow	Ily	
2001	Josie and the Pussycats	Alexandra Cabot	
2003	Bringing Down the House	Ashley	Nominated—MTV Movie Award for Best Fight
2003	Exposed	Amy	
2003	BachelorMan	Heather	
2003	Big Fish	Mildred	
2004	Along Came Polly	Roxanne	
2004	50 First Dates	Noreen	
2004	Soul Plane	Barbara Hunkee	
2004	Dodgeball: A True Underdog Story	Fran Stalinovskovichdaviddivichski	
2004	Anchorman: The Legend of Ron Burgundy	Zoo Keeper	
2004	Meet Market	Ericka	
2005	The Civilization of Maxwell Bright	Cop	
2005	Charlie and the Chocolate Factory	Scarlett Beauregarde	
2006	Just My Luck	Peggy Braden	
2006	Mojave Phone Booth	Sarah	
2006	Stormbreaker	Nadia Vole	
2007	Live!	Plummy	
2007	Entry Level	Liz	
2007	Feast of Love	Agatha Smith	
2008	Pretty Ugly People	Lucy	
2008	Harold & Kumar Escape from Guantanamo Bay	Raylene	
2008	Visioneers	Sahra	
2008	American Crude	Gigi	
2008	Soccer Mom	Wendy Handler / Coach Lorenzo	
2009	Spring Breakdown	Charlene	
2009	Still Waiting...	Rocky Rhoades	
2009	Taking Chances	Faith Fishback	
2009	A Fork in the Road	Nola	
2010	Barry Munday	Lida Griggs	
2010	Miss Nobody	Charmaine	
2011	The Artist	Constance	
2011	A Cinderella Story: Once Upon a Song	Gail Van Ravensway	
2012	My Uncle Rafael	Blair Schumacher	
2013	Bakersfield, Earth	Judy	
2013	Percy Jackson: Sea of Monsters	Tempest	
2013	Killing Vivian	Megan	
2014	A Haunted House 2	Noreen	
2014	Just Before I Go	Officer CT	
2014	Gone Girl	Ellen Abbott	
2014	Kiss Me	Pam	
2014	Dragula	Maggie	
2015	Uncle Nick	Michelle	
2015	Hollywood Adventures	Casting Director	
2016	Director's Cut	Herself / Mabel	
2016	Captain Fantastic	Ellen McCune	Nominated—Screen Actors Guild Award for Outstanding Performance by a Cast in a Motion Picture
2016	Slash	Ronnie	
2016	Emma's Chance	Susan Peirce	
2016	Pandemic	Denise	
2016	Miles	Leslie Wayne	
2017	Deidra & Laney Rob a Train	Mrs. Fowler	
2017	Jumanji: Welcome to the Jungle	Coach Webb	
2018	Traffik	Sally Marnes	
2018	Nobody's Fool	Lauren Meadows	
2018	Miss Arizona	Bev	
2018	Grace	Liz	
2019	Walk. Ride. Rodeo.	Tina Snyder	
2019	Ma	Mercedes	
2022	Teen Titans Go! & DC Super Hero Girls: Mayhem in the Multiverse	Cythonna / Speaker of Nations (voice)	
2022	Bring It On: Cheer or Die	Principal Simmons	
2022	The Moon & Back	Diane Gilbert	
2023	Unseen	Carol	
2023	If You Were the Last	Megan Benson	
2023	A Tourist's Guide to Love	Mona	
2024	All That We Love	Kayla	
2025	For Worse	Julie	
2025	Crystal Cross	Therapist	
2026	Stop! That! Train!	Horny Divorcee	
TBA	The Life and Deaths of Wilson Shedd †	TBA	Post-production

=== Television ===
Year	Title	Role	Notes
1999	Mad About You	Beautiful Woman	Episode: "The Final Frontier: Part 2"
1999	The Drew Carey Show	Stacey	Episode: "Drew's Reunion"
1999	Friends	Hillary	Episode: "The One with Ross's Teeth"
2000	Battery Park	Suzanne	Episode: "Walter's Rib"
2001	Ally McBeal	Marcia Hooper	Episode: "Reach Out and Touch"
2001	The Wayne Brady Show	Various	6 episodes
2001	Roswell	Windy Sommers	Episode: "Control"
2001	The Tick	Stacy Waxman	Episode: "Arthur Needs Space"
2002	Philly	Charise DuPree	Episode: "Mojo Rising"
2002	Home Alone 4	Vera Murchins	TV film
2003	Frasier	Shannon Palmer	Episode: "Maris Returns"
2004–2015	Two and a Half Men	Miss Dolores Pasternak	4 episodes
2005	My Name Is Earl	Shelly Stoker	Episode: "Broke Joy's Fancy Figurine"
2006–2008	Boston Legal	Renee Winger	3 episodes
2007	Heroes	Hope	2 episodes
2007	The Wedding Bells	Amanda Pontell	Main role
2007–2010	The Sarah Silverman Program	Scarlett Lacey	4 episodes
2008	In Plain Sight	Teri Ranzino / Treena Morris	Episode: "Never the Bride"
2008	Pushing Daisies	Betty Bee	Episode: "Bzzzzzzzzz!"
2008–2011	American Dad!	Tracy / Drunk Girl / Sorority Girl	Voice; 2 episodes
2009	Numbers	Janet Galvin	Episode: "Ultimatum"
2010	Grey's Anatomy	Dr. Baylow	Episode: "The Time Warp"
2010	Rizzoli & Isles	Merch owner	Episode: "I Kissed a Girl"
2010	The Life & Times of Tim	Receptionist / Marcy / Nancy (voice)	4 episodes
2010–2011	The Mentalist	Karen Cross	2 episodes
2010–2011	$#*! My Dad Says	Katie Palmer	2 episodes
2011	Up All Night	Kaye	Episode: "Mr. Bob's Toddler Kaleidoscope"
2011	Family Guy	Kitty Hawk Woman (voice)	Episode: "Amish Guy"
2012	Don't Trust the B— in Apartment 23	Angie Beckencort	Episode: "Whatever It Takes..."
2013	Newsreaders	Rebecca Lionwek	Episode: "Auto Erotic"
2013	1600 Penn	Sarah Harlan	Episode: "Frosting/Nixon"
2013	2 Broke Girls	Charity Channing	Episode: "And Not-So-Sweet Charity"
2013	Warehouse 13	Lily Abbott	Episode: "The Big Snag"
2013	The Mindy Project	Nancy	Episode: "Mindy Lahiri Is a Racist"
2013–2014	Inside Amy Schumer	Various	3 episodes
2013–2014	The Exes	Sabrina / Julie	2 episodes
2014	The Crazy Ones	Melora	Episode: "Dead and Improved"
2014	Jennifer Falls	Dina Simac	Main role
2014	Partners	Biffy Saint Murray	Episode: "Let's Have a Simple Gwedding"
2014	Infomercials	Jan Jeremy	Episode: "Goth Fitness"
2015	Hot in Cleveland	Canadian Joy	2 episodes
2015	Law & Order: Special Victims Unit	Trudy Malco	Episode: "Granting Immunity"
2015	Z Nation	Bernadette	Episode: "Rozwell"
2015	Where the Bears Are	Maggie Dexter	3 episodes
2015	TripTank	Woman / Crap Girl / Anna (voice)	3 episodes
2015–2018	Another Period	Celery Bellacourt / Celery Savoy	Recurring role
2016	Bordertown	Gert Buckwald (voice)	Main role
2016	The Soul Man	Alicia	Recurring role
2016	Sing It!	Marcy	Main role
2016	Lady Dynamite	Carol Simples	Episode: "A Vaginismus Miracle"
2016	Major Crimes	Tina Walker	Episode: "Off the Wagon"
2016	Mary + Jane	Librarian	Episode: "Girl on Gurl"
2016	Notorious	Callie Connors	Episode: "Kept and Broken"
2017	Dropping the Soap	Lily	2 episodes
2017	The Catch	Chloe Jackson	Episode: "The Bad Girl"
2017	Mom	Natasha	Recurring role, 5 episodes
2017	One Mississippi	Cassandra Night	Episode: "Who Do You Think You Are?"
2017–2018	Disjointed	Mary Jane	2 episodes
2018	The Goldbergs	Madame Charbenaux	Episode: "1990-Something"
2018	Impulse	Cleo Coles	Main role
2019	Drunk History	Christa Gruhle	Episode: "Love"
2019	Bob Hearts Abishola	Liz	Episode: "Square Hamburger, Round Buns"
2019	The Unicorn	Ava	Episode: "Wade Delayed"
2019	Ghosting: The Spirit of Christmas	Chrissy	TV film
2019	To Tell the Truth	Celebrity Panelist	Season 4, episode 11
2020	Dirty John	Karen Kintner	Recurring role (season 2; The Betty Broderick Story)
2021	Mr. Mayor	Nicole	Episode: "Hearts Before Parts"
2021	Star Trek: Lower Decks	Cardassian Interrogator (voice)	Episode: "Strange Energies"
2021	A Tale Dark & Grimm	The Rain / Widow Fischer (voice)	4 episodes
2021	Y: The Last Man	Roxanne	5 episodes
2021	The Big Leap	Tonya Lovewell	2 episodes
2022	The Great North	Ms. McNamara / Limes (voice)	3 episodes
2022	Archer	Dr. Malory Lacania (voice)	Episode: "Out of Network"
2022	A Hollywood Christmas	Theresa Frost	TV film
2022	Celebrity Beef	Herself	Episode: "Critical Designer vs. Critically Acclaimed"
2023	Doogie Kameāloha, M.D.	Ms. Crawford	Episode: "A Hui Hou (Until We Meet Again)"
2023	Harlan Coben's Shelter	Hannah	7 episodes
2024–2025	The Sex Lives of College Girls	Tracey Baker	2 episodes
2026	9-1-1: Nashville	Victoria Vamp	Episode: "Small Potatoes"
2026–present	Sterling Point	Denise Ballantine	Main role

=== Web ===
Year	Title	Role	Notes
2012	Greetings from Home	Sue	12 episodes
2013–2014	Cleaners	Eileen	Main role, 18 episodes
2016	The Lottery	Teresa Yaw	Short film

=== Appearances ===
Year	Title	Role	Notes
2017	Play Dodgeball with Ben Stiller	Fran Stalinovskovichdaviddivichski	Omaze Charity Dodgeball
2017	"Run"	Nurse	Music video by Foo Fighters

== Stage credits ==
Year	Title	Role	Notes
1996	900 Oneonta	Burning Jewel	Circle Repertory Theatre; September 15–22, 1996
2008	Boeing-Boeing	Gretchen	Longacre Theatre; September 9 – October 7, 2008
2012–2013	Bare	Sister Joan	New World Stages; December 19, 2012 – February 3, 2013

== Discography ==
=== Albums ===
- It's OK to Be Happy, Smith & Pyle (2008)

=== Singles ===
- "One Night Stand", Smith & Pyle (2010)
- "Rafael", Smith & Pyle (2010)
