= Kellita Smith =

American actress (born 1969)

- Born: January 15, 1969 (age 57); Chicago, Illinois, U.S.
- Education: Santa Rosa Junior College
- Occupation: Actress
- Years active: 1993–present
- Known for: Wanda McCullough – The Bernie Mac Show

Kellita Smith (born January 15, 1969) is an American actress, model and comedian. She is best known for her role as Wanda McCullough, Bernie Mac's wife on the Fox sitcom The Bernie Mac Show.

== Life and career ==
Born in Chicago, Illinois, She was raised in Oakland, California. Smith studied at Santa Rosa Junior College, receiving her associate degree in political science.

In early years, Smith worked as a model. She began her acting career on stage in a regional production of Tell It Like It Tiz. Other theatrical credits include the Los Angeles productions of No Place to be Somebody at the K.C. Theatre Company, Feelings (The Hudson Theatre) for which she won an NAACP Theatre Award for Best Supporting Actress in 1996, The Thirteenth Thorn (Complex Theatre) for which she was nominated for an NAACP Theatre Award for Best Actress, and One Woman Two Lives, which premiered at The Imagined Life Theater in July 2009.

On television, Smith made her debut in an episode of In Living Color and later guest-starred on Living Single, Moesha, 3rd Rock from the Sun, The Parkers and NYPD Blue. She had recurring roles in Martin, Sister, Sister, and Malcolm & Eddie before co-starring on The Jamie Foxx Show from 1997 to 1999. In 2001, she was cast opposite Bernie Mac in the Fox sitcom The Bernie Mac Show. The series aired on Fox for five seasons from 2001 to 2006. She was nominated four times for an NAACP Image Award for her role as Wanda McCullough on The Bernie Mac Show. In film, Smith co-starred alongside Mo'Nique in Hair Show (2004), and later appeared in Fair Game, King's Ransom, Roll Bounce and Three Can Play That Game.

In 2012, Smith returned to television with the role of First Lady Katherine Johnson in the syndicated sitcom, The First Family. In 2014, Smith was cast as Roberta Warren in the Syfy post-apocalyptic series, Z Nation. In this role, she also appeared on Sharknado 3: Oh Hell No! in 2015. In the Cut is an American sitcom created by Bentley Kyle Evans that debuted on Bounce TV on August 25, 2015.[1] Seth Kelley. "Bounce TV Orders Original Comedy Series 'In the Cut'". Variety. Retrieved January 28, 2016. Kellita Smith as Cheryl (season 2–present), the new owner of the beauty salon Cheryl's, and Jay's wife. On March 19, 2020, it was announced that the sixth season would premiere on April 1, 2020.[8] ""In the Cut" Returns for New Season Starting April 1 on Bounce". The Futon Critic. March 19, 2020.

She is also described as B. Rosenberger Rosenberg's African American girlfriend in Charlie Kaufman's novel Antkind.

== Filmography ==
=== Film ===
Year	Title	Role	Notes
1994	House Party 3	Girl in Yellow & Black Dress	
1995	The Crossing Guard	Tanya	
1999	Q: The Movie	Mo Mo	
2000	Retiring Tatiana	CeCe	
2000	Masquerade	Monica	TV movie
2001	Kingdom Come	Bernice Talbot	
2004	Hair Show	Angela Whittaker	
2005	Fair Game	Cheryl	
2005	King's Ransom	Renee King	
2005	Roll Bounce	Vivian	
2007	Three Can Play That Game	Carla	
2007	Feel the Noise	Tanya	
2010	From Cape Town with Love	Marsha	Short
2010	Conspiracy X	Justice Jackie Woods	
2011	She's Not Our Sister	Vivian	TV movie
2012	Gang of Roses 2: Next Generation	Madame L	
2012	Sistaah Friend	Super Shero of Truth	Short
2013	The Love Section	Pat Darden	
2014	Imperial Dreams	Tanya	
2015	A Deadly Adoption	Officer F. Mason	TV movie
2015	Sharknado 3: Oh Hell No!	Sergeant Roberta Warren	TV movie
2015	The Man in 3B	Det. Anderson	
2017	The Preacher's Son	Anita Emerson	
2018	The Choir Director	Anita Emerson	
2020	Influence	Carla Hudson	

=== Television ===
Year	Title	Role	Notes
1993	In Living Color	-	Episode: "Dirty Little Dick"
1993	Living Single	Susan	Episode: "A Kiss Before Lying"
1994	Hangin' with Mr. Cooper	Jaclyn	Episode: "Clothes Make the Man"
1994–95	Martin	Tracy	Recurring Cast: Season 3
1995	Sister, Sister	Tonya	Recurring Cast: Season 3
1996	The Wayans Bros.	Claire	Episode: "Hearts and Flowers"
1996	Dangerous Minds	Dominique	Episode: "Hair Affair"
1996	Moesha	Melba	Episode: "Women Are from Mars, Men Are from Saturn"
1997	High Incident	-	Episode: "Remote Control"
1997	Malcolm & Eddie	Danielle	Recurring Cast: Season 1
1997	The Parent 'Hood	Sheila	Episode: "Zaria Peterson's Day Off"
1997–99	The Jamie Foxx Show	Cherise	Recurring Cast: Seasons 2–3
1999	The Steve Harvey Show	Ava Whitley	Episode: "Little Stevie Blunder"
1999	The Parkers	Valerie Maxwell	Episode: "And the Band Plays On"
2000	For Your Love	Sophia	Episode: "The Special Delivery"
2001	Nash Bridges	Regina Adams	Episode: "Kill Joy"
2001	NYPD Blue	Mrs. Childs	Episode: "Under Covers"
2001–06	The Bernie Mac Show	Wanda McCullough	Main Cast
2002	Pyramid	Herself/Celebrity Contestant	Episode: "October 14 & 22, 2002"
2003	Biography	Herself	Episode: "Bernie Mac: TV's Family Man"
2007	Baisden After Dark	Herself	Episode: "Age Ain't Nothin But a Number"
2012	Life After	Herself	Episode: "Camille Winbush"
2012–15	The First Family	First Lady Katherine Johnson	Main Cast
2013	Kimmie's Kitchen	Herself	Episode: "Bread Pudding/Kelita Smith"
2014	According to Him + Her	Herself	Episode: "Episode #1.12"
2014–18	Z Nation	Lieutenant Roberta Warren	Main Cast
2015	Unsung Hollywood	Herself	Episode: "Bernie Mac"
2016	Apollo Night LA	Herself/Celebrity Host	Episode: "ANLA 161"
2016–19	In the Cut	Cheryl	Recurring Cast: Seasons 2-3 & 5, Guest: Season 4
2017	Hell's Kitchen	Herself	Episode: "Fusion/Confusion"
2018–19	From the Mouths of Babes	Herself	Recurring Guest
2020	Two Degrees	Herself	Episode: "U.B.E.R."
2021	This Is Us	Elizabeth Dubois	Episode: "Birth Mother"
2021	The Couch	Mrs. Childs	Main Cast
2021–23	Lace	Judge Sears	Recurring Cast
2022	From Scratch	Lynne	Main Cast

== Awards and nominations ==
Year	Awards	Category	Recipient	Outcome
2003	NAACP Image Awards	NAACP Image Award for Outstanding Actress in a Comedy Series	"The Bernie Mac Show"	Nominated
2004	NAACP Image Awards	NAACP Image Award for Outstanding Actress in a Comedy Series	"The Bernie Mac Show"	Nominated
2005	NAACP Image Awards	NAACP Image Award for Outstanding Actress in a Comedy Series	"The Bernie Mac Show"	Nominated
2006	NAACP Image Awards	NAACP Image Award for Outstanding Supporting Actress in a Comedy Series	"The Bernie Mac Show"	Nominated
2013	NAACP Image Awards	NAACP Image Award for Outstanding Supporting Actress in a Comedy Series	"The First Family"	Nominated
