= Twice Upon a Time (1998 film) =

1998 film

- Genre: Fantasy/Romantic Comedy
- Written by: Scott Fifer
- Directed by: Thom Eberhardt
- Starring: Molly Ringwald; George Newbern; Rob Youngblood; Melora Walters; Nicholas Guest; Ellen Crawford; Shawnee Smith; John Fugelsang; Michael Whaley
- Music by: Brian Adler
- Country of origin: United States
- Original language: English

Production
- Executive producer: Robert W. Christiansen
- Producers: Scott Fifer, Rick Blumenthal
- Cinematography: Barry Wilson
- Editor: Paul Dixon
- Running time: 90 minutes
- Production companies: ABC Pictures; Chris/Rose Productions

Original release
- Network: Lifetime
- Release: November 9, 1998

Twice Upon a Time is a 1998 fantasy romantic comedy TV movie made for the Lifetime cable network, starring Molly Ringwald and George Newbern and directed by Thom Eberhardt. It was written and co-produced by Scott Fifer (who went on to found GO Campaign) for ABC Pictures and Chris/Rose Productions. The film also features Ringwald's own father, blind jazz pianist Robert Ringwald, in a brief role.

== Plot summary ==
A discontented woman (Ringwald) finds herself in a parallel universe where she is living with an old flame from years ago, but soon begins to wish she was back in her old world with her present lover (Newbern).

== Cast ==
- Molly Ringwald as Beth Sager
- George Newbern as Joe
- Rob Youngblood as Nick Fowler
- Melora Walters as Alannah Meribone
- Nicholas Guest as Bed & Breakfast Manager
- Ellen Crawford as Peg Sager
- Shawnee Smith as Maggie Fowler
- John Fugelsang as Brett
- Michael Whaley as Sanford Watts
