= Kriss Turner =

American screenwriter and producer

- Born: Hawaii, United States
- Occupations: Television producer, writer and screenwriter
- Years active: 1994–present

Kriss Turner is an American screenwriter and producer.

Turner has written and produced episodes for the television series Sister, Sister, Living Single, The Bernie Mac Show, Cosby, Everybody Hates Chris, Whoopi and Sherri.

Turner also the wrote the 2006 feature film Something New. She was featured on CNN's two-night series Black in America, where she discussed the idea of being a single African-American woman who is successful in a male-dominated field. There she speaks about the dualities women face because they are successful and the lack of like-minded African-American men.

She was born in Hawaii.
