= Two Can Play That Game (film) =

- Theatrical release poster
- Directed by: Mark Brown
- Written by: Mark Brown
- Produced by: Doug McHenry; Mark Brown; Paddy Cullen
- Starring: Vivica A. Fox; Anthony Anderson; Wendy Raquel Robinson; Tamala Jones; Bobby Brown; Gabrielle Union; Morris Chestnut
- Cinematography: Alexander Gruszynski
- Edited by: Earl Watson
- Music by: Marcus Miller
- Distributed by: Screen Gems (through Sony Pictures Releasing)
- Release date: September 7, 2001
- Running time: 90 minutes
- Country: United States
- Language: English
- Budget: $13 million
- Box office: $22.4 million

Two Can Play That Game is a 2001 American romantic comedy film written and directed by Mark Brown and starring Vivica A. Fox and Morris Chestnut, with Anthony Anderson, Wendy Raquel Robinson, Tamala Jones, Bobby Brown, and Gabrielle Union in supporting roles. The film was released on September 7, 2001, received generally unfavorable reviews from critics, and grossed $22 million against a $13 million budget.

== Plot ==
Shante Smith (Vivica A. Fox) is a woman who gives advice on how to keep a man in check. Her ideals are challenged when her man, an attorney, named Keith Fenton (Morris Chestnut), threatens to stray. Smith is a well-educated woman who feels that when it comes to men and their tricks, she knows them all.

On the other end, Shante’s boyfriend Keith is being led by his friend Tony (Anthony Anderson), who thinks he knows all the tricks that women play. When Shanté's boyfriend, Keith, is caught red-handed stepping out with a co worker, Shanté institutes her "Ten Day Plan" to get her man in line. The battle soon begins, though at the conclusion of the movie, Shante and Keith get back together.

== Cast ==
- Vivica A. Fox as Shante Smith
- Morris Chestnut as Keith Fenton
- Anthony Anderson as Tony
- Gabrielle Union as Connie "Conny" Spalding
- Wendy Raquel Robinson as Karen
- Tamala Jones as Tracey Johnson
- Bobby Brown as Michael
- Mo'Nique as Diedre
- Ray Wise as Bill Parker
- Jeff Markey as Phil
- Dondre T. Whitfield as Dwain
- Lee Anthony as Attorney in Elevator
- Cherise Bangs as Miller Girl #2
- Zatella Beatty as Cynthia
- Mark Brown as Lying Man #1
- Chris Spencer as Lying Man #2
- Pierre Burgess as Lying Man #3
- Mark Christopher Lawrence as Lying Man #4
- Natashia Williams as Sexy Woman in Club
- La La Anthony as Party DJ
- Colby Kane as Calvin
- Terrence "Skyy" Grant as Choir Member
- Pretty Boy Duncan as Town Skank
- Amy Hunter as Nita

== Reception ==
=== Box office ===
The film opened at #2 at the box office in the United States, grossing $7.7 million in its first opening weekend, behind The Musketeer. The film was released in the United Kingdom on September 13, 2002, where it failed to reach the Top 10.

=== Critical response ===
On the review aggregator website Rotten Tomatoes, 40% of 62 critics' reviews are positive, with an average rating of 4.9/10. The website's consensus reads: "As a romantic comedy, Two Can Play That Game is far more mean-spirited than romantic. Also, some critics say the movie is misandristic in its attitudes and has too many blatant product placements." Metacritic, which uses a weighted average, assigned the film a score of 35 out of 100, based on 21 critics, indicating "generally unfavorable" reviews. Audiences polled by CinemaScore gave the film an average grade of "A–" on an A+ to F scale.

== Sequel ==
A direct to DVD film, titled Three Can Play That Game, was released in February 2008. The sequel was rated, although there was still a little inappropriate content. Three Can Play That Game starred Vivica A. Fox as Shante Smith, a famous couple's counsellor. This time around, Fox's character plays a supporting role, as opposed to her starring role in the original. Morris Chestnut or his character doesn't make an appearance, but he was mentioned.

== Stage play adaptation ==
Stage producer and playwright Je'Caryous Johnson adapted a stage play based on the film of same name in 2017. Vivica A. Fox starred and reprised her role as Shante Smith. The production also starred Columbus Short as Keith, Porsha Williams as Conny, Carl Payne as Tony, and also featured Gary Dourdan, RonReaco Lee, Cocoa Brown and Vivian Green.
