= Out of the Dark (Curtiss novel) =

1964 novel by Ursula Curtiss

Out of the Dark is a thriller novel by American writer Ursula Curtiss, published on May 18, 1964, about how a prank call by a couple of teenagers ends up with a murderer on their trail.

In 1965, the novel was filmed as I Saw What You Did, directed by William Castle and starring Joan Crawford; and again in 1988 for television with the same title, starring Shawnee Smith, Tammy Lauren and David and Robert Carradine.
