= Killer Bud =

2001 film by Karl T. Hirsch

- Directed by: Karl T. Hirsch
- Written by: Greg DePaul; Hank Nelken
- Starring: Corin Nemec; David Faustino; Danielle Harris; Caroline Keenan
- Release date: 2001
- Running time: 92 minutes
- Country: United States
- Language: English

Killer Bud is an American comedy film released in 2001. It was Robert Stack's final film prior to his death in 2003.
