= David Faustino =

American actor (born 1974)

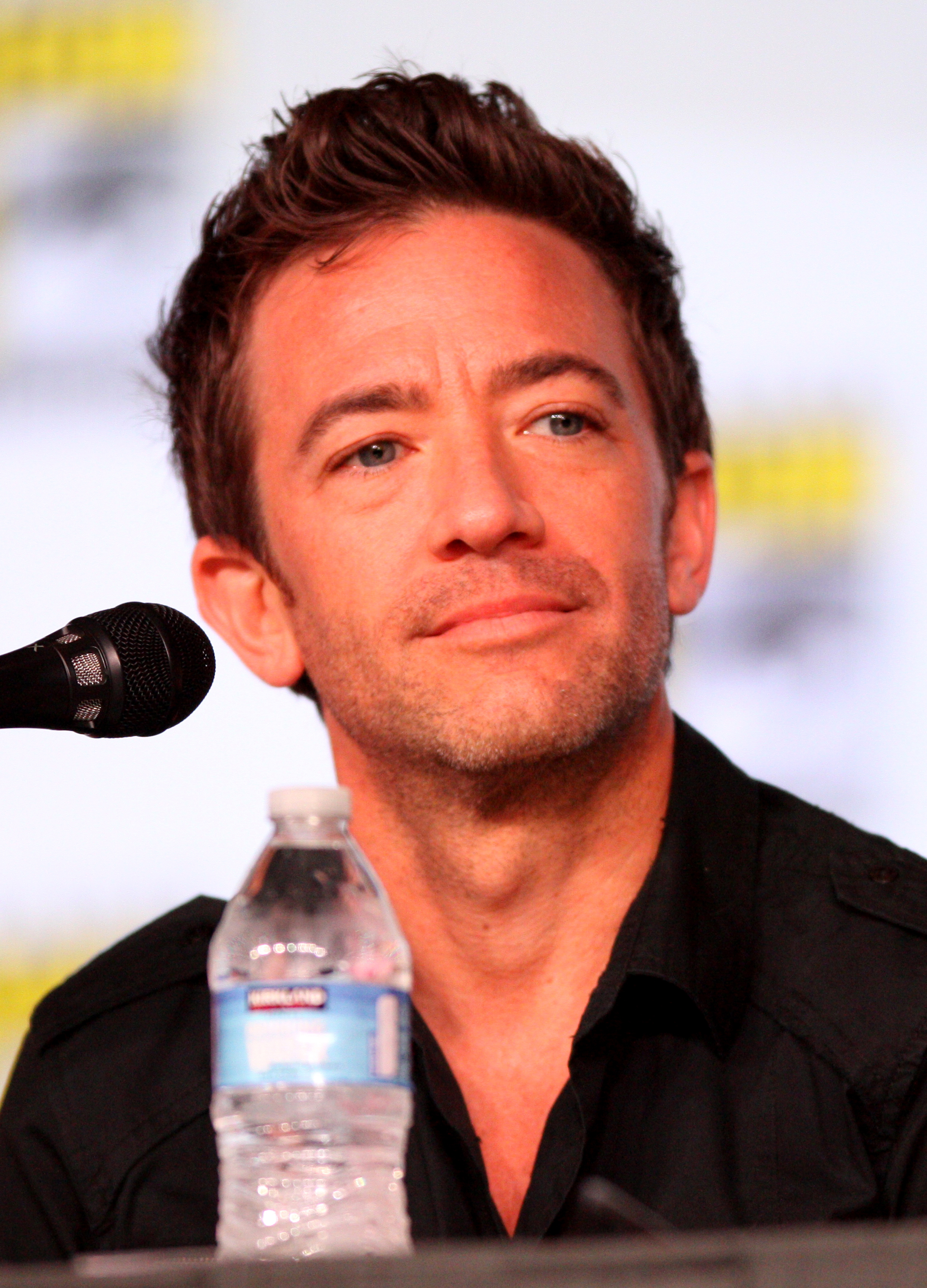
- Faustino at the 2012 San Diego Comic-Con
- Born: David Anthony Faustino; March 3, 1974 (age 52); Los Angeles, California, U.S.
- Occupations: Actor; radio personality
- Years active: 1980–present
- Spouse: Andrea Elmer (m. 2004; div. 2007)
- Partner: Lindsay Bronson
- Children: 2

David Anthony Faustino (/fɔːˈstiːnoʊ/; born March 3, 1974) is an American actor who played Bud Bundy on the Fox sitcom Married... with Children. He has also voiced animated characters for Nickelodeon, including Mako on The Legend of Korra and Helia on Nickelodeon's revival of Winx Club.

== Early life ==
Faustino was born in Los Angeles, California, on March 3, 1974, to Roger, a costumer, and Kay Faustino (née Freeman), a homemaker.

== Career ==
=== Acting ===
Faustino made his television debut at the age of three months old when he appeared in a Lily Tomlin Special in 1974. He did not start acting regularly until 1980, after a small role on Little House on the Prairie. Throughout the early to mid-1980s, Faustino guest-starred on several TV shows such as Highway to Heaven, Family Ties, St. Elsewhere, and The Love Boat.

In 1986 and 1987, Faustino played the older of two young sons in the Disney films Mr. Boogedy and Bride of Boogedy.

In 1987, he landed a full-time gig on Married... with Children, which was his big break. He played Bud, the younger of the two Bundy children, in 259 episodes, from April 5, 1987, until the season finale on June 9, 1997. He reprised the role of Bud Bundy in such series as Parker Lewis Can't Lose and Top of the Heap. Faustino also appeared on Burke's Law, MADtv, and The New Addams Family.

In 2001, Faustino appeared in the independent film Killer Bud, produced by Aglet Productions. The following year, he appeared in the reality television special Celebrity Boot Camp (a shortened version of the Boot Camp series for celebrities). In 2005, Faustino guest-starred on two episodes of One on One.

In 2007–09, Faustino developed and starred in Star-ving, a weekly Internet comedy series on Crackle, an online video network backed by Sony Pictures Entertainment. A total of 12 episodes of Star-ving were produced. Faustino played an exaggerated version of himself in the series, which he wrote and developed with several friends as an "anti-Entourage." "This is a very twisted take on what I've been through all these years," Faustino said. He also starred as Jason Dockery in the 2008 film RoboDoc.

Faustino appeared with the cast of Married... with Children again at the 7th Annual TV Land Awards in 2009, presented by Dr. Phil. He also had cameo appearances in two episodes of the HBO series Entourage.

Faustino co-starred in the feature Not Another B Movie which was distributed by Troma Entertainment in 2011. The same year, he was cast in Nickelodeon's revival of Winx Club as the voice of Helia. The following year, Nickelodeon cast him again in the sequel series The Legend of Korra as the voice of firebender Mako, a central character named after the late Mako Iwamatsu (the original voice actor of Iroh in the first two seasons of the original series Avatar: The Last Airbender). He also voiced Dagur the Deranged as a secondary villain in season one and the main villain in season 2 of DreamWorks Dragons, and Later, a redeemed character in Race to the Edge.

In 2017, Faustino appeared in the Bones 12th-season episode "The Radioactive Panthers in the Party," playing a fictional version of himself as a suspect in the death of an aspiring filmmaker.

=== Music ===
In 1992, Faustino released the rap album Balistyx, which spawned one single titled "I Told Ya."

== Personal life ==
Faustino co-founded and co-hosted a nightclub in Los Angeles named Balistyx, which is the same name as his rap album. The club was "the first hip-hop/funk club on the Sunset Strip," and was originally held on Thursday nights at the Whisky a Go Go in 1991. The club closed after a final New Year's Eve party at The Roxy in 1993.

After meeting at a spiritual center in Los Angeles and dating for five years, he married pop musician Andrea Elmer on January 24, 2004, at the Little White Wedding Chapel in Las Vegas, Nevada. They separated in May 2006. Faustino sought not to pay spousal support, according to the papers filed in Los Angeles. On February 6, 2007, Faustino officially filed for divorce in Los Angeles County Superior Court, citing irreconcilable differences.

Faustino was arrested for misdemeanor possession of marijuana in Florida in May 2007. A disorderly intoxication charge was later dropped after Faustino agreed to enroll in a drug rehabilitation facility.

On November 14, 2015, his girlfriend Lindsay Bronson gave birth to their daughter.

== Filmography ==
=== Film ===
Film
Year	Title	Role	Notes
1982	Neil Simon's I Ought to Be in Pictures	Martin	
1983	The Star Chamber	Tony Hardin	
1986	Mister Boogedy	Corwin Davis	
1987	Bride of Boogedy	Corwin Davis	
1990	I'm Naked Thinking of You	Cousin Dave	
1991	Perfect Harmony	Paul	
1994	Men Lie		
1994	Fatal Vows: The Alexandra O'Hara Story	Joey Pagan	
1996	Kiss & Tell	Strip-E, "The Bird"	
1998	12 Bucks	Cornfed	
1998	Lovers & Liars	Darrel	
1999	Dirt Merchant	Sponge	
2000	Get Your Stuff	Ron	
2001	MacArthur Park	Bobby	
2001	The Heist	Chuck	
2001	Killer Bud	Buzz Frawley	
2001	10 Attitudes	Billy (Attitude #3)	
2005	Freezerburn	Paul the P.A.	
2006	National Lampoon's Pucked	Carl	
2006	Nice Guys	Ben	
2006	Puff, Puff, Pass	Steve	
2007	Leo	David	
2008	The Hustle	Derrick	
2008	RoboDoc	Jason Dockery	Associate producer
2008	Boston Strangler: The Untold Story	Albert DeSalvo	
2008	Unconventional	Himself	
2009	Official Rejection	Himself	Documentary
2009	Busted	Wilburt	
2009	Official Rejection	Himself	
2010	Hollywont	Rob	
2010	Not Another B Movie	Hines	
2012	Winx Club: The Secret of the Lost Kingdom	Helia	Voice
2013	Winx Club 3D: Magical Adventure	Helia	Voice
2013	I Know That Voice	Himself	
2015	Entourage	Himself	
2015	Bachelors	Gus	
2023	Teenage Mutant Ninja Turtles: Mutant Mayhem	Normal Nate	Voice
TBA	Nite Tales 2: The Movie	Himself	Completed

=== Television ===
Television
Year	Title	Role	Notes
1974	Lily Tomlin Special	Himself	
1980	Little House on the Prairie	Josh	Episode: "The Silent Cry"
1981	Trapper John, M.D.	Little Boy	Episode: "'Tis the Season"
1982	In the Custody of Strangers	David	Television film
1983	Summer Girl	Jason Shelburne	Television film
1983	Shooting Stars	Patrick	Television film
1983	Fantasy Island	Michael Ashley	Episode: "Random Choices/My Mother, the Swinger"
1983	Family Ties	Keith Baily	Episode: "To Snatch a Keith"
1984	The Love Boat	Scott Russell	Episode: "Ace in the Hole/Uncle Joey's; Song/Father in the Cradle"
1984	St. Elsewhere	Boy	Episode: "Two Balls and a Strike"
1984	E/R	Randy Beal	Episode: "Save the Last Dance for Me"
1985	Highway to Heaven	Robbie Down	Episode: "Plane Death"
1985	I Had Three Wives	Andrew Beaudine	Main role
1985	Scarecrow and Mrs. King	Actor	Episode: "Utopia Now"
1986	CBS Schoolbreak Special	Louie Dawson	Episode: "The Drug Knot"
1986	The Twilight Zone	Micah Frost	Episode: "The Storyteller"
1987–1997	Married... with Children	Bud Bundy	259 episodes
1987	Adventures of the Gummi Bears	Cavin	Voice, season 3
1990	Parker Lewis Can't Lose	Bud Bundy	Episode: "Musso & Frank"
1990	The Earth Day Special	Bud Bundy	
1991	Perfect Harmony	Paul	Television film
1991	Top of the Heap	Bud Bundy	Episode: "The Agony and the Agony"
1991	Blossom	Himself	Episode: "Blossom – A Rockumentary"
1992	CBS Schoolbreak Special	Travis Bickle	Episode: "Words Up!"
1992	Where in the World Is Carmen Sandiego?	Himself	Episode: "The Immigration Station Perpetration"
1994	Burke's Law	Carl Loomis	Episode: "Who Killed the Soap Star?"
1994	Robin's Hood	Actor	Episode: "Memories Are Made of This"
1996	Madtv	Himself	Episode: "#1.12"
1996	Dead Man's Island	Haskell Prescott	Television film
1997	Madtv	Host	Episode: "#2.21"
1999	Jesse	Dwayne	Episode: "The Best Deal Possible"
1999	The New Addams Family	Greg the Alien	Episode: "The Close Encounters of the Addams Kind"
1999	Unhappily Ever After	Jimbo Bacilli	Episode: "Tiffany Burger"
2000	Batman Beyond	Sean Miller	Voice, episode: "The Last Resort"
2000	Cover Me: Based on the True Life of an FBI Family	Older Chance, Narrator	2 episodes; uncredited
2000	Nash Bridges	Simon/Denny	2 episodes
2000–2003	Static Shock	Brandon / Starburst, Executive	Voice, 2 episodes
2001	Cover Me: Based on the True Life of an FBI Family	Older Change, Narrator	Episode: "Borderline Normal"; Uncredited
2001	Intimate Portrait	Narrator	Episode: "Katey Sagal"
2001	The Zeta Project	Scruffy	Voice, episode: "His Maker's Name"
2001	The Test	Himself	Episode: "The Sex Etiquette Test"
2001	Going to California	Kurt Beamis	Episode: "The Big Padoodle"
2002	The X-Files	Michael Daley	Episode: "Sunshine Days"
2002	The Rerun Show	Pete	Episodes: "The Partridge Family: My Son, the Feminist/Married... with Children: The Dance Show"
2004	The Bernie Mac Show	Droobie	Episode: "Droobie or Not Droobie"
2004	The Help	Adam Ridgeway	5 episodes
2004	Entourage	Himself	Episode: "The Review"
2005	What's New, Scooby-Doo?	Curt Crunch	Voice, episode: "Wrestle Maniacs"
2005	One on One	Ian/Chad	2 episodes
2005	TV Land Confidential	Himself	Episode: "Changing Times and Trends"
2006	American Dad!	Himself	Voice, episode: "Rough Trade"
2006	Loonatics Unleashed	Arthur / Time Skip	Voice, episode: "Time After Time"
2007	TV Land Confidential	Himself	Interviewee, episode: "Finales"
2008	The Batman	Fox / David	Voice, episode: "Attack of the Terrible Trio"
2008	Rules of the Game		Executive producer
2009	Star-ving	Himself	Executive producer, director, and writer
2009	Robot Chicken	Himself, Dr. Rudy Wells, Grandfather	Voice, episode: "Love, Maurice"
2009	Entourage	Himself	Episode: "Scared Straight"
2009	Dark Christmas	Himself	
2010	7 Days	Himself	Member of Team 1 Episode dated October 22, 2010
2010	Scooby-Doo! Mystery Incorporated	Bud Shelton	Voice, episode: "Revenge of the Man Crab"
2011	Clunkers		Episode: "Intervention"
2011	Working Class	Derek	Episode: "Short, Then Sweet"
2011–2015	Winx Club	Helia	Voice, Nickelodeon dub
2012	SuperFuckers	Jack Krak	Voice, main role
2012–2014	The Legend of Korra	Mako	Voice, main role
2013–2014	DreamWorks Dragons	Dagur the Deranged	Voice, 8 episodes
2013	Modern Family	Tater	Episode: "Bad Hair Day"
2013	Bad Samaritans	Dax Wendell	
2015	The Exes	Donny Lutz	Episode: "Good Will Hinting"
2015	Real Husbands of Hollywood	Himself	Episode: "Model Behavior"
2015–2018	Dragons: Race to the Edge	Dagur	Voice, recurring role
2016	TMI Hollywood	Host	Episode: "The Fast and the Faustino"
2016	Atomic Shark	Fletcher	Television film
2016	Sharknado: The 4th Awakens	Bud	Television film
2017	Bones	Fictional version of himself	Episode: "The Radioactive Panthers in the Party"
2017	The Young and the Restless	Howard Green	8 episodes
2018	Cape Kids	IQ	Voice
2019	Drop the Mic	Himself	Episode: "Jason Mitchell vs. Adina Porter / David Faustino vs. Joey Lawrence"
2019	Spirit Riding Free: Spirit of Christmas	Ronny	Voice
2024	Tales of the Teenage Mutant Ninja Turtles	Normal Nate	Voice
TBA	Inside Jokes: AKA Reel Jokes		Television film
TBA	Hollywould	Leggie	Voice, 2 episodes Post-production

=== Video games ===
Video games
Year	Title	Role	Notes
2014	The Legend of Korra	Mako	
2026	Grand Theft Auto VI	The Local Population	

=== Music videos ===
Music videos
Year	Song title	Notes
1992	"I Told Ya"	D' Lil
1993	"Dazzey Duks"	Duice
1995	MC's Act Like They Don't Know	KRS-One
