= I Saw What You Did (1988 film) =

1988 television film by Fred Walton

- Promotional advertisement
- Genre: Drama; Horror; Thriller
- Based on: Out of the Dark by Ursula Curtiss
- Written by: Cynthia Cidre
- Directed by: Fred Walton
- Starring: Shawnee Smith; Tammy Lauren; Candace Cameron; Robert Carradine; David Carradine
- Theme music composer: Dana Kaproff
- Country of origin: United States
- Original language: English

Production
- Executive producers: Jon Epstein; Wendy Riche
- Producer: Barry Greenfield
- Production locations: Universal Studios - 100 Universal City Plaza, Universal City, California
- Cinematography: Woody Omens
- Editor: Richard Bracken
- Running time: 93 minutes
- Production company: Universal Television

Original release
- Network: CBS
- Release: May 20, 1988

I Saw What You Did is a 1988 American made-for-television horror film directed by Fred Walton, with a screenplay by Cynthia Cidre. It is a remake of the 1965 theatrical film of the same name starring Joan Crawford, and the second adaptation of Out of the Dark by Ursula Curtiss. The film stars Shawnee Smith and Tammy Lauren as teenage friends Kim Fielding and Lisa Harris, respectively, and Candace Cameron as Kim's younger sister Julia; opposite them is Robert Carradine as the mentally disturbed Adrian Lancer, and David Carradine as his brother Stephen. While making prank phone calls pretending to know who the other person is, and what they've done, Kim and Lisa call Adrian, who has recently murdered his girlfriend, causing him to set out to find them.

Casting for the film began in May 1987, with most of the principal actors — Smith, Lauren, and the Carradine brothers — being cast in June. Filming began that same month in various locations in Los Angeles. Upon its premiere on CBS on May 20, 1988, the film was the second most-viewed program at the time of its airing. It received mixed reviews from critics, who deemed it inferior to the original film adaptation. Nevertheless, it won a Primetime Emmy Award for Outstanding Cinematography for a Miniseries or a Special.

== Plot ==
Lisa Harris, a popular high school student who is more interested in her boyfriend Louis than getting good grades, is invited to dinner by Kim Fielding, her intelligent classmate who never breaks any rules and has to babysit her sister Julia, since her father is out of town for the night. Feeling she has nothing in common with Kim, Lisa only agrees to come over to meet her boyfriend Louis there. Bored at awaiting his arrival, she joins Kim and Julia in making prank calls. When it's her turn, Lisa calls Adrian Lancer, a man with mental problems who just murdered his girlfriend Robyn Griffin for declining his marriage proposal. Lisa decides to hang up, and later calls people, saying, "I saw what you did, and I know who you are", before hanging up.

Later, Lisa and Kim discuss Kim's love life, deciding she needs an older man who appreciates her. They decide to call Adrian again, but Lisa, afraid to seduce him, repeats the line, "I saw what you did, and I know who you are." Adrian, who was caught in the act when burying Robyn's body, does not realize it's a prank, and is determined to get rid of her. Kim, thinking he was flirting with her, calls him again later, agreeing to meet with him. She is nervous to actually meet him, but she is convinced that she should drive by his house. Meanwhile, Adrian's visiting brother Stephen starts to suspect that Adrian did something to Robyn.

Taking the car to his house, Adrian notices Kim, and opens his front door. Kim, afraid of admitting who she is, pretends that her car broke down, and that she has to call for help. When Adrian lets Kim use his phone, she pretends to call someone, but mentions she is at Adrian's, who immediately becomes suspicious, as he has not told his name to her. She starts to get afraid of him, and leaves, but forgets her purse by mistake when Stephen comes back. After she drives away, Stephen informs Adrian that he told Robyn about his mental problems. Back at home, Louis and his friends finally drop by Kim's house to pick up Lisa. Not wanting to ditch Kim, she decides not to go with him. Kim still feels hurt, though, for finding out Lisa only used her for meeting friends, and Lisa soon leaves.

Stephen finds out that Adrian killed his girlfriend, but before he can do anything about it, Adrian knocks him out. Just as he prepares to burn him with gasoline, he decides to silence Kim first. After he leaves, Stephen regains consciousness, and reports him to the police. On his way to Kim's house, a policeman pulls Adrian over, and, recognizing who he is, chases him. Adrian speeds away, and runs the car off the road. It blows up, causing the police to assume he perished in the explosion; he continues on to Kim's house. Upon confronting her, she admits she prank-called him. Interrupted by a call from Lisa informing Kim about hearing on the news that Adrian murdered his girlfriend, Kim tries to warn the police, but Adrian stops her, setting the house on fire. When Adrian attempts to kill Kim, the family dog charges into him, knocking him into the fire, allowing the girls to get outside with the help of a neighbor, Randy. After Kim and the police arrive, they witness Adrian running outside, burning alive, and dying before he can hurt anybody else.

One night, after the incident is over, Kim receives a phone call from Stephen, who says, "Kim, I know who you are. You killed my brother", causing her to scream as the film ends.

== Cast ==
- Shawnee Smith as Kim Fielding
- Tammy Lauren as Lisa Harris
- Candace Cameron as Julia Fielding
- Robert Carradine as Adrian Lancer
- David Carradine as Stephen Lancer
- Rosanna Huffman as Mrs. Harris
- Jo Anderson as Robyn Griffin
- Bo Brundin as Mr. Marley
- Patrick O'Bryan as Louis
- Dana Gladstone as Sid
- Alan Fudge as Mark Fielding
- Susan Kellermann as Gym Teacher
- Robert Winley as Randy

== Production ==
I Saw What You Did was written by Cynthia Cidre, and is based on the novel Out of the Dark by Ursula Curtiss. Casting began in May 1987, with Stack Pierce being announced to have a role in the film. In June, Shawnee Smith and Tammy Lauren were cast as the leads. In the same month, it was also announced that real-life brothers Robert Carradine and David Carradine also had starring roles, Robert playing the film's villain and David his brother, described as "straight-arrow". The casting of the Carradine brothers was assumed to indicate that the role portrayed by Joan Crawford in the original film would be diminished in the remake. Filming of the movie began the same month in various locations in Los Angeles.

== Reception ==
=== Ratings ===
The film was broadcast on May 20, 1988, on CBS, from 9:00 pm to 11:00 pm. During its broadcast, the film received a household rating share of 11.5/21, according to Nielsen Media Research, placing second in its time slot behind Rambo: First Blood Part II, which garnered a 12.4. This means that 11.5 percent of all households with a television viewed the film, while among those households watching TV during this time period, 21 percent of them were actively watching the film.

=== Critical response ===
In his book Movie and Video Guide 1993, film critic Leonard Maltin refers to the film as "bland", compared to the original by William Castle. Similarly, in Joan Crawford: The Essential Biography, biographers Lawrence J. Quirk and William Schoell refer to the film as "abysmall", and consider it "inferior" to the original.

The Times-Tribune was critical of Fred Walton's directing, stating that the movie reified his status as a "B-moviemaker", and disapproving of him recycling old themes from his previous film When a Stranger Calls (1979).

In his book Nightmare Movies: Horror on Screen Since the 1960s, Kim Newman argues that I Saw What You Did was responsible for the eventual creation of Dark Castle Entertainment, a production company that created remakes of horror films.
