= I Am the Wind =

2007 play by Jon Fosse

I Am the Wind (Nynorsk: Eg er vinden) is a 2007 play by the Norwegian writer Jon Fosse. It is about two men, The One and The Other, who travel by boat until The One commits suicide by drowning himself.

== Production ==
The play was written for the Bergen International Festival where it premiered on 24 May 2007, directed by Eirik Stubø and starring Ole Johan Skjelbred-Knutsen and Fridtjov Såheim. The same version was performed at the National Theatre in Oslo from 4 October the same year. Kari Gravklev was nominated for the Hedda Award for Best Scenography/Costumes/Lighting.

An English-language production was directed by Patrice Chéreau in 2011 for the Festival d'Avignon, and also performed in London, Paris, Vienna, Lyon and Barcelona. A version directed by Paul Takacs was performed at the 59E59 Theaters in New York City in 2014.

== Reception ==
Charles Spencer of The Daily Telegraph wrote:

I hated this play while I was watching it. But, blow me down, I woke up this morning and found that I Am the Wind was still whirling round in my head like the twister in The Wizard of Oz. When a play adheres in the memory like this, it’s usually a sign that it has some merit.

Spencer described the plot and production, and wrote:

Even as I write, I realise all this sounds unbearably pretentious – and much of it is. Yet lurking in the depths of this 70-minute drama is a strong apprehension of both the fleeting nature of human relationships and the terrible listlessness and lack of will that are symptomatic of chronic depression.

The play was reviewed in The New York Times in 2014 by Ben Brantley:

An elliptical and very brief play (it ran about an hour when I saw it), I Am the Wind is not for those who believe that the self-conscious discussion of things cosmic should be put aside after graduation from college. But, as translated by the eminent British playwright Simon Stephens (Harper Regan), Mr. Fosse's terse, rhythmic script captures a gut-level anxiety about elemental questions of identity.
