= Akvavit Theatre =

Theater company in Chicago, Illinois

- Formation: January 2008
- Type: Theatre group
- Purpose: Scandinavian
- Location: Chicago, Illinois
- Artistic director(s): Kirstin Franklin; Breahan Pautsch

Akvavit Theatre is a theater company in Chicago with a focus on Nordic and Scandinavian works. It has been active since 2010.

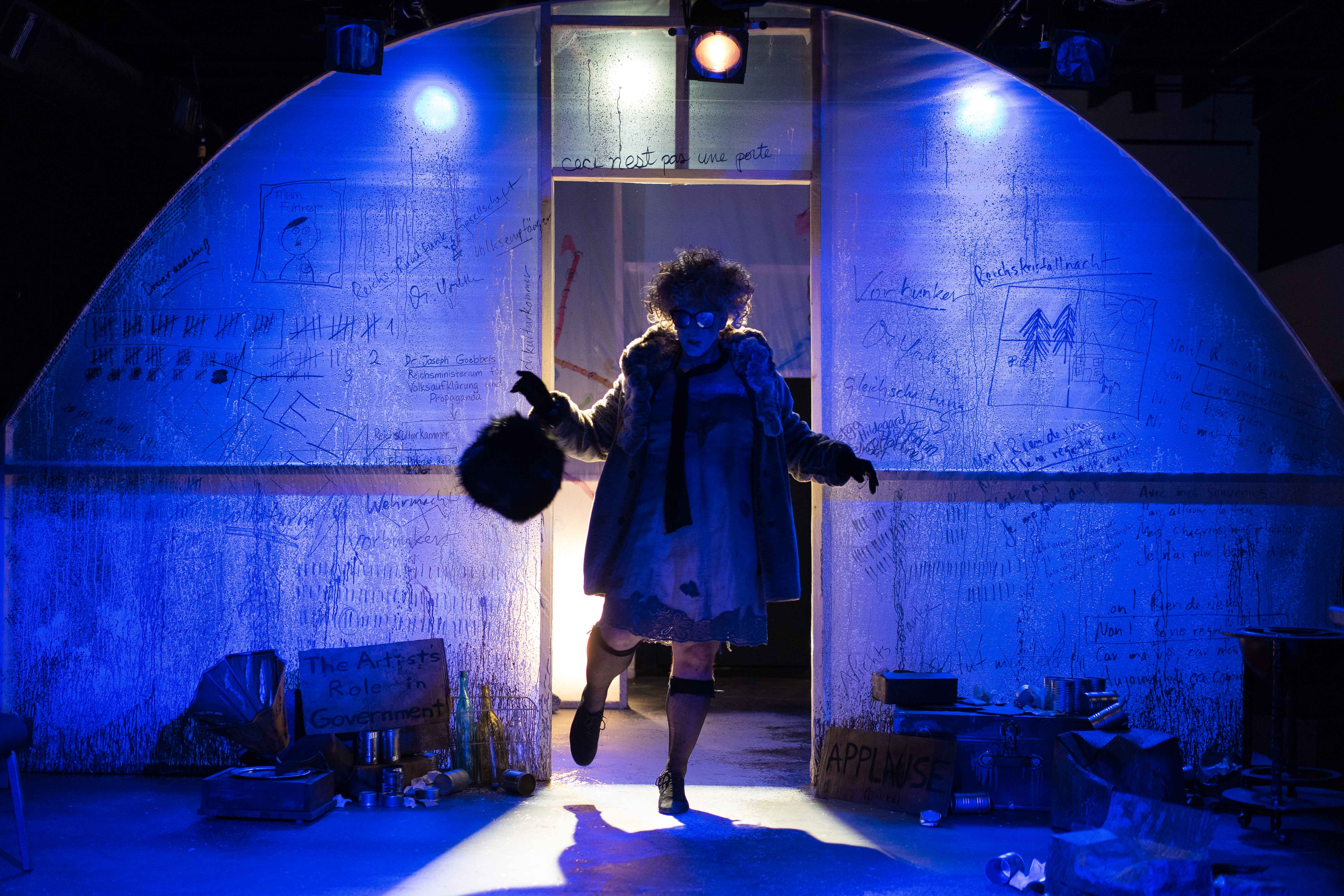
Jay Torrence as Leni Riefenstahl in Akvavit Theatre's production of 'Hitler on the Roof' by Rhea Leman.

It has EIN 61-1611906 as a 501(c)(3) Public Charity.

== History ==
A group of five staged readings from several Scandinavian countries formed the initial production on 8 October 2010. It was born out of the "Nordic Spaces" project funded by the Bank of Sweden Tercentenary Foundation. The first reading was God Times Five, a play by Swedish playwright Jonas Hassen Khemiri, directed by Chad Eric Bergman. The four other plays in the sequence were Red and Green, by Dane Astrid Saalbach, directed by Jessica Hutchinson; Kokkola by Finn Leea Klemola, directed by Kevin Heckman; Verkeleg, a reality play by Norwegian Gyrid Axe Øvsteng, directed by Robin Witt; and Óhapp by Icelandic playwright Bjarni Jónsson, directed by Jonathan Berry.

In 2015 the company staged the U.S. premiere of Andri Snær Magnason's Blue Planet, based on his book, The Story of the Blue Planet, a "family-friendly" story directed by Wm. Bullion. Also in 2015, the company took part in the annual holiday message from the Chicago theater community.

Akvavit's 2017 production of Hitler on the Roof by Rhea Leman was selected as one of the productions to be produced at the 2018 re-opening season of Theatre on the Lake.
