= I Saw What You Did =

1965 film by William Castle

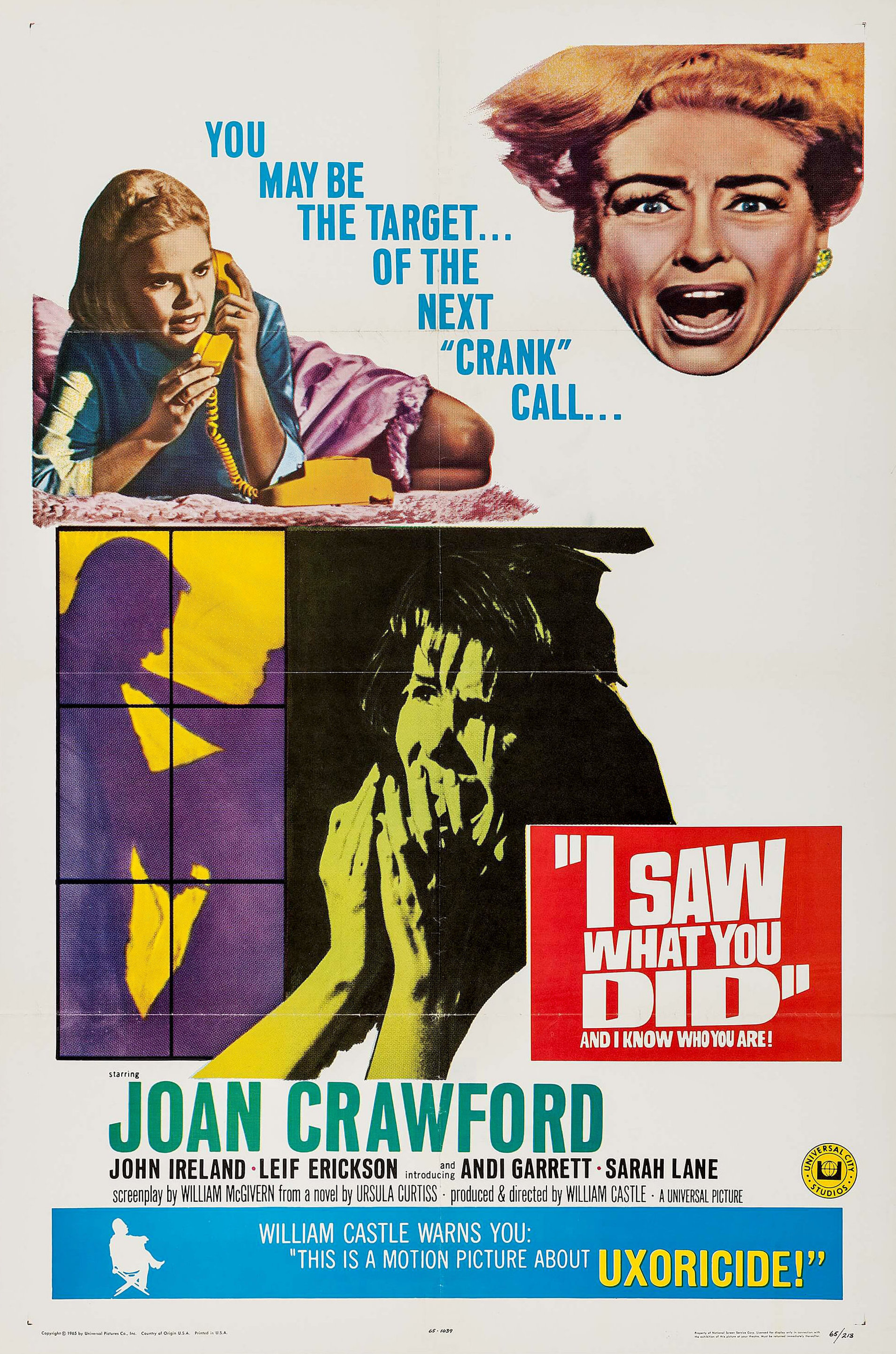
- Original film poster
- Directed by: William Castle
- Screenplay by: William P. McGivern
- Based on: Out of the Dark by Ursula Curtiss
- Produced by: William Castle; Dona Holloway
- Starring: Joan Crawford; John Ireland; Leif Erickson
- Cinematography: Joseph Biroc
- Edited by: Edwin H. Bryant
- Music by: Van Alexander
- Color process: Black and white
- Production company: William Castle Productions
- Distributed by: Universal Pictures
- Release date: July 21, 1965
- Running time: 82 minutes
- Country: United States
- Language: English
- Box office: $1,000,000

I Saw What You Did is a 1965 American horror thriller film released by Universal Pictures and starring Joan Crawford and John Ireland. The plot follows two teenage girls who find themselves in serious danger after making a prank phone call to a man who just murdered his wife. The screenplay by William P. McGivern was based upon the 1964 novel Out of the Dark by Ursula Curtiss. The film was produced and directed by William Castle.

== Plot ==
When teenage friends Libby Mannering and Kit Austin are home alone with Libby's younger sister Tess, they amuse themselves by randomly dialing telephone numbers and telling whoever answers: "I saw what you did, and I know who you are." Libby places a call to Steve Marak, a man who had just murdered his wife Judith and disposed of her body in the woods. Believing he has been found out, Marak wants to track down the caller in order to silence her.

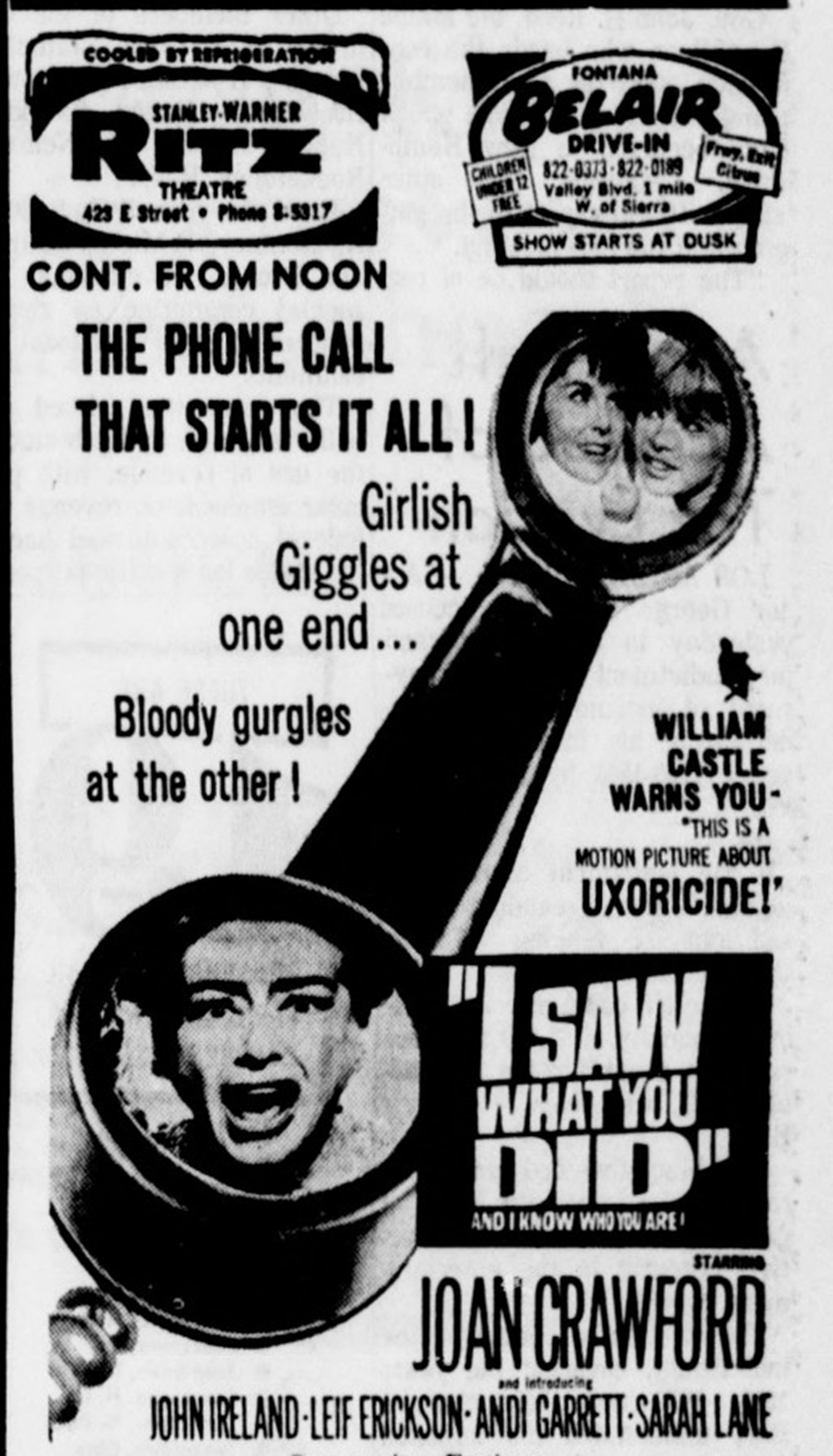
Advertisement from 1965

Marak's neighbor Amy, who is in love with him and had been trying to woo him away from his wife, listens in on the line while Marak is speaking with Libby. Intrigued by Marak's voice, Libby takes Tess and a frightened Kit along on a drive to Marak's address. Amy discovers Libby and chases her off, thinking that Libby is Marak's lover, inadvertently saving Libby from being murdered by Marak, who has seen her and grabbed a knife. Amy snatches the registration card from the car before Libby drives away and gives it to Marak, telling him to keep it as a souvenir of his last fling. Amy tries to blackmail him into marrying her, telling him she knows about the murder, but he stabs her to death after they have a drink. With Libby's address and phone number from the car registration, Marak calls to ask if her parents are home and then sets out to the Mannering home.

Libby's mother, 90 miles away in Santa Barbara with her husband, is frantic with worry when no one answers the home phone and has her husband call the police to check the house. A patrolman visits and finds that the three girls are safe.

Libby, afraid of losing her driving privileges, swears Kit to secrecy over their misadventure. While Kit's father is driving her home, a news report over the car's radio announces that a woman's body has been found in the woods and provides a description of a man who was seen leaving the burial site.

Marak arrives at the Mannering home and questions Libby and Tess about the call. Libby convinces him that it was just a prank. He returns her mother's identification and leaves, but waits outside. When Kit calls, she tells Libby that Marak matches the description of the killer about whom she had heard on the radio. Marak overhears and enters to silence Libby and Tess, but they evade him. Libby tries to escape but cannot start her parents' car. Marak emerges from the back seat and starts to strangle Libby, but he is shot by a police officer who had come back to the Mannering house after Kit revealed the secret to her father, who phoned the police.

== Cast ==
- Joan Crawford as Amy Nelson
- John Ireland as Steve Marak
- Leif Erickson as Dave Mannering
- Sara Lane as Kit Austin
- Andi Garrett as Libby Mannering
- Sharyl Locke as Tess Mannering
- Patricia Breslin as Ellie Mannering
- John Archer as John Austin
- John Crawford as State Trooper
- Joyce Meadows as Judith Marak

== Production ==
Advertisements for the movie read "William Castle warns you: This is a motion picture about UXORICIDE!" and, in an early trailer for the film, Castle advised the audience that a section of the theater would be installed with seat belts for audience members "who might be scared out of their seats." The advertised gimmick was abandoned before the release of the film and was never actually used. The announcer in the film's trailer says repeatedly: "DON'T ANSWER IT!!!"

== Critical reviews ==
Howard Thompson called I Saw What You Did a "generally broad and belabored expansion of a nifty idea"; he considered redundant the "middle chapter" of the film, "involving the aroused, snarling killer" and thought the film should have "held to the impressionable viewpoint of the youngsters." Saturday Review noted "Unfortunately, there is little for the eye, ear, or mind in William Castle's egregiously low-budgeted I Saw What You Did, an attempt at terror starring Joan Crawford and John Ireland." Variety wrote "[The film] is a well-produced, well-acted entry in the suspense-terror field....[Crawford's] slightest gesture or expression...conveys vivid emotion."

== Home media ==
I Saw What You Did was released by Anchor Bay Entertainment on VHS and Region 1 DVD on August 24, 1999. On May 23, 2014, it was re-released as an exclusive DVD-R by Universal as part of its Universal Vault Series, but in a full-frame presentation.

On May 17, 2016, Shout! Factory released the film on Blu-ray under its sub-label Scream Factory.

== Remake ==
I Saw What You Did was remade for television in 1988 with Robert Carradine, David Carradine, Tammy Lauren, and Shawnee Smith.

== See also ==
- List of American films of 1965
