= Bride of Boogedy =

1987 American television film directed by Oz Scott

- VHS cover
- Genre: Fantasy comedy
- Written by: Michael Janover
- Directed by: Oz Scott
- Starring: Richard Masur; Mimi Kennedy; Tammy Lauren; David Faustino
- Music by: John Addison
- Country of origin: United States
- Original language: English

Production
- Producers: Michael Janover; Oz Scott
- Cinematography: King Baggot
- Editor: Duane Hartzell
- Running time: 100 minutes
- Production companies: Michael Janover-Oz Scott Productions; Walt Disney Television

Original release
- Network: ABC
- Release: April 12, 1987

Bride of Boogedy is a 1987 American family film, directed by Oz Scott and written by Michael Janover, which originally aired on ABC on April 12, 1987, as an episode of The Disney Sunday Movie.

The film tells the continuing story of the Davis family and their encounters with an evil 300-year-old ghost in the fictional New England town of Lucifer Falls. The film is a sequel to Mr. Boogedy, which aired in 1986. The film is available to stream on Disney+.

== Plot ==
The movie begins about a year after the events of the first story. The Davis family has fit in very well with the townspeople of Lucifer Falls. *Almost* all of them, except for a grumpy general store owner, Tom Lynch (Eugene Levy) who has a great disdain for Carlton and the growing popularity he's gained among the townspeople. But that is the least of their worries, as their daughter Jennifer, and two younger sons, Corwin and R.E., begin to sense that Mr. Boogedy may return for revenge. Though both parents shrug off the idea, even after getting a warning from a fortune teller Madeleinska (Karen Kondazian).

The two boys share a nightmare in which they find a strange glowing key that leads them to a foggy graveyard. A large statue of Boogedy comes to life and attempts to attack them while the ghost of Jonathan calls to them. They awaken, finding the key (not glowing) in the basement as the two try desperately to convince their parents that Boogedy is back.

The children spend the day wandering around town when they reach a cemetery on the outskirts. The caretaker, Lazarus, shows them to the ominous statue of William Hanover, the real name of Mr. Boogedy.

To put an end to their children's beliefs, Carlton and Eloise use their faux seance both to prove that Boogedy is gone. However, the two unwittingly awake his spirit while Carlton impersonates him after the statue is seen splitting open; which may have been helped when Lynch tried to take out their store's power. Possessed by Mr. Boogedy, Carlton displays very strange and frightening behavior. One night, he takes the key down to the basement, and recovers the magic cloak, which previously vanished in the former encounter with Boogedy. He chases the terrified family through the house, until he laughs the entity out of his body and away from the house, with help from Eloise's visiting brother, Elmer.

At the Lucyfest Carnival, Mr. Boogedy, possessing Lynch, brings the wax horror icons in the Davis's newly acquired storefront to life. He then takes Lynch to the cemetery, where the cloak is placed on his statue, and Boogedy is fully restored again. Returning to the carnival, Boogedy unleashes his powers and destroys the carnival. Seeing Eloise dressed as The Widow Marian, he hypnotizes and summons her to him.

Using a remorseful Lynch's help and Madeleinska's assistance, the group summons the ghost of Jonathan, who reveals how to send Boogedy back to the underworld. The group returns to the cemetery and use the key to open the doorway to the underworld, which summons Boogedy back with Eloise. With Jennifer dressed as a Marian decoy, Carlton grabs Eloise. After Jennifer takes his attention from her mother, the group pulls both to safety and banish Boogedy's spirit using the key. Jonathan's ghost plays one last joke as the group leaves.

== Cast ==
- Richard Masur as Carlton Davis
- Mimi Kennedy as Eloise Davis
- Tammy Lauren as Jennifer Davis
- David Faustino as Corwin Davis
- Joshua Rudoy as Reginald Ernest "R.E." Davis
- Leonard Frey as Walter Witherspoon
- Howard Witt as William Hanover / Mr. Boogedy
- Eugene Levy as Tom Lynch, Owner of Lynch's General Store
- Ray Girardin as Elmer Davis, Eloise's Brother, (share same unusual laugh)
- Alice Hirson as Mrs. Hooter, Townswoman
- Karen Kondazian as Madeleinska, Medium
- Vincent Schiavelli as Lazarus, The Gravedigger
