= Chains of Gold =

1991 American made-for-television film

- Genre: Action; Crime; Drama
- Written by: John Petz; Linda Favila; Anson Downes; John Travolta
- Directed by: Rod Holcomb
- Starring: John Travolta; Marilu Henner; Héctor Elizondo; Joey Lawrence; Benjamin Bratt; Tammy Lauren
- Music by: Trevor Jones
- Country of origin: United States
- Original language: English

Production
- Producers: Jonathan D. Krane; Don Schain
- Production location: Miami
- Cinematography: Bruce Surtees; Dariusz Wolski
- Editor: Christopher Nelson
- Running time: 95 minutes
- Production company: M.C.E.G.
- Budget: $10 million

Original release
- Network: Showtime
- Release: September 15, 1991

Chains of Gold is a 1991 American made-for-television crime drama film starring and co-written by John Travolta. It was directed by Rod Holcomb and included one of the early performances of Joey Lawrence, who was nominated for Young Artist Award for his role in the movie.

The film premiered on Showtime on September 15, 1991, in United States and was released theatrically in Germany. It was released to DVD on December 15, 1998.

The opening credits state that Chains of Gold is "based on actual events", though details of the actual events themselves remain difficult to pin down.

The film was shot in Miami, Florida, US. It is the only film so far written by twice-nominated Academy Award actor John Travolta.

== Plot ==
Scott Barnes (Travolta) is a former ad executive turned social worker living in Miami. He is also a recovering alcoholic who stopped drinking after killing his son in a drunk-driving crash. One of his cases is Tommy (Joey Lawrence) a street kid who has been selling crack for an organization called the Youth Incentive Program (YIP). Barnes is unaware of this, but suspects something when Tommy buys expensive gifts for his mother and sister. He also notices the YIP tattoo on Tommy's arm.

Tommy is kidnapped by YIP and forced to package crack into vials in an abandoned building with many other children. After Tommy does not come home for several days, his sister calls the morgue and they inform her he is dead. Barnes goes to the morgue to identify Tommy, but discovers it is not him, although he sees the YIP tattoo on the corpse. While trying to find Tommy, he witnesses a shootout where one of the gunmen has a YIP tattoo. He goes to see Sgt. Palco (Bernie Casey), who tells him about YIP. Barnes, convinced Tommy has been kidnapped by YIP, then talks to the head of the narcotics division, Lt. Ortega (Hector Elizondo) who tries to convince him to stay away from the gang.

While looking for Tommy in the streets, Barnes notices the YIP henchman James (Ramon Franco) and follows him to a nightclub. There, he meets his old girlfriend Jackie (Marilu Henner) and is shocked when he sees her speaking to James. After sleeping together, Barnes learns Jackie is a lawyer for YIP and tells her he wants to get into the organization to rescue Tommy. After some consternation, Jackie tells Barnes that YIP is willing to induct him as a member.

Barnes goes to meet with Carlos (Benjamin Bratt), the head of YIP, who wants him to help expand the organization into the suburbs. James then shows him around the organization and leads him to the warehouse where Tommy is being held. Tommy tries escaping and is taken to the Madison House, an abandoned factory where members of YIP who commit transgressions are killed. Barnes finds out about this from one of Tommy's friends. Barnes is taken to the Madison House and sees Tommy. He then goes to see Lt. Ortega, who tells him if he interferes further, he will be charged with conspiracy to distribute narcotics. One of Carlos' henchmen sees Barnes enter the police station and informs Carlos, who now believes him to be an FBI agent.

Barnes goes to see Jackie and discovers that she has been killed by Carlos' henchmen, who then attack him. Barnes escapes but is quickly kidnapped by the henchmen. He is taken to the Madison House and thrown into an elevator pit filled with alligators, but gets caught in the wiring and manages to escape. Barnes finds Carlos and the two have a fist-fight just as the police raid the building. Barnes finally manages to punch Carlos down into the elevator pit, killing him. The police arrest the rest of the YIP members and Barnes drives away with Tommy in a police car.

== Cast ==
- John Travolta as Scott Barnes
- Marilu Henner as Jackie
- Héctor Elizondo as Lieutenant Ortega
- Joey Lawrence as Tommy Burke
- Bernie Casey as Sergeant Falco
- Benjamin Bratt as Carlos
- Conchata Ferrell as Martha Burke
- Tammy Lauren as Rachel Burke

== Release ==
Following the Bankruptcy of production company Management Company Entertainment Group (M.C.E.G.) the film premiered on Showtime. Showtime had a deal with M.C.E.G. to air their films following their theatrical runs. After M.C.E.G. reorganized following their bankruptcy, Chains of Gold along with other M.C.E.G. productions Boris and Natasha: The Movie and Fatal Charm aired directly on Showtime and skipping a theatrical release altogether.

Filming started on Chains of Gold in May 1989. Previously, M.C.E.G. had been prepping Chains of Gold for a March 1990 release until its bankruptcy curtailed the planned release date.

Following an airing on Showtime, the film was released on home video on December 16, 1992.
