= Bride Wars =

2009 film by Gary Winick

- Theatrical release poster
- Directed by: Gary Winick
- Screenplay by: Greg DePaul; Casey Wilson; June Diane Raphael
- Story by: Greg DePaul
- Produced by: Julie Yorn; Kate Hudson; Alan Riche
- Starring: Kate Hudson; Anne Hathaway; Kristen Johnston; Bryan Greenberg; Candice Bergen
- Cinematography: Frederick Elmes
- Edited by: Susan Littenberg Hagler
- Music by: Edward Shearmur
- Production companies: Fox 2000 Pictures; Regency Enterprises; New Regency Productions; Birdie Productions; Riche/Ludwig Productions; Dune Entertainment
- Distributed by: 20th Century Fox
- Release date: January 9, 2009
- Running time: 89 minutes
- Country: United States
- Language: English
- Budget: $30 million
- Box office: $115.8 million

Bride Wars is a 2009 American romantic comedy film directed by Gary Winick and written by Greg DePaul, Casey Wilson, and June Diane Raphael. It stars Kate Hudson and Anne Hathaway, with Kristen Johnston, Bryan Greenberg, and Candice Bergen in supporting roles. In the film, two childhood best friends, who have made many plans together for their respective weddings, turn into sworn enemies when they are forced to share the same wedding date and venue.

The film was released theatrically in the United States on January 9, 2009, by 20th Century Fox. It received negative reviews from critics and grossed a worldwide total of $115.8 million against a production budget of $30 million. A Chinese remake of the same name was released in 2015.

== Plot ==
Emma Allan and Olivia "Liv" Lerner are longtime best friends. Ever since they witnessed a wedding 20 years earlier at the Plaza Hotel, they have dreamed of holding their own June weddings there. Liv's parents died when she was a child. Liv grows up to be a successful attorney at Ropes & Gray. She is used to getting her way and constantly tries to be perfect. Her boyfriend Daniel Williams is a hedge fund manager. Emma becomes a middle school teacher who takes care of everyone, but sometimes forgets to take care of herself. Her boyfriend of ten years, Fletcher Flemson, is controlling, and takes advantage of her compliant, meek nature.

One day, Emma and Liv find a Tiffany box concealed in Liv's closet. Both are excited, believing it means Daniel is about to propose. However, that night, it is Fletcher who proposes. Liv confronts Daniel at his office the next morning. It turns out he had planned to propose that night, but he then asks her on the spot. Emma and Liv schedule a meeting with Manhattan's most famous wedding planner, Marion St. Claire, who tells them there are only three spots open at The Plaza in June: two at the same time on June 6 and one on June 27. They each choose a different date so their big days will not clash. However, both are scheduled for June 6 by mistake.

They ask the third bride, Stacey, to switch her date with Emma, but she refuses. Liv fights with Stacey as she is registering for gifts, causing Liv and Emma to be escorted out of the store. After a week of passive-aggressive hostility, it is clear that neither will compromise. The women declare war after a slight misunderstanding that Liv already announced her wedding date. In retaliation, the outraged Emma sets her date as well, which Liv discovers at their shared bridal shower. They threaten and insult each other in front of their friends, who decide not to take sides.

Both attempt to sabotage the other's wedding. Liv changes Emma's dance instructor; Emma secretly sends Liv candy so her dress will not fit; Liv makes Emma's spray tan bright orange; Emma changes Liv's hair dye to blue; Liv registers Emma on Babies "R" Us and spreads rumors that she is pregnant; Emma shows up to Liv's invite-only bachelorette party and outdances her. Emma and Fletcher argue over her behavior. Fletcher cannot accept her newfound outspokenness and self-confidence. In contrast, Liv has learned to be more sensitive and expressive and has grown closer to Daniel. However, her stress about the wedding causes her demotion at work.

At the Plaza shortly before their ceremonies, Emma's father gives Liv his blessing, causing her to regret setting up a wild spring break DVD to play at Emma's ceremony. She sends her assistant Kevin to replace the DVD with the original one, filled with childhood memories. Believing it is a prank, he does not do it. Before the brides enter their respective venues, they share a brief moment of reconciliation from afar, smiling at each other. Liv's smile is confident, but Emma's is tinged with tears, suggesting she is having second thoughts about her fiancé.

Emma begins walking down the aisle, but stops when she sees the spring break DVD playing. Infuriated, she tackles Liv at her wedding on the other side. While wrestling in their dresses on the floor, they shock the guests. Emma tells Fletcher she is not the same person he fell in love with 10 years earlier, and they subsequently call off their wedding. Liv's wedding resumes after they reconcile. Emma, now Liv's maid of honor, later dances with Liv's brother Nate, a well-known magazine journalist.

A year later, Liv and Emma meet up for drinks, where it is revealed that Emma married Nate. Liv proposes a toast to marriage, but Emma says she is not drinking. When Liv says she is not either, they realize they are both pregnant and their due dates are the same: March 3. The best friends squeal with excitement and hug happily.

== Cast ==
- Kate Hudson as Olivia "Liv" Lerner
  - Zoe O'Grady as young Liv
- Anne Hathaway as Emma Allan
  - Shannon Ferber as young Emma
- Kristen Johnston as Deb Delgado, one of Emma's colleagues.
- Bryan Greenberg as Nathan "Nate" Lerner, Liv's brother who is in love with Emma
- Chris Pratt as Fletcher Flemson
- Steve Howey as Daniel Williams
- Candice Bergen as Marion St. Claire. She also serves as the narrator.
- John Pankow as John Allan, Emma's father
- Michael Arden as Kevin, Liv's assistant at work.
- June Diane Raphael as Amanda, a friend of Emma and Liv's.
- Casey Wilson as Stacy Kindred, the third bride
- Lauren Bittner as Amie, one of Emma and Liv's closest friends.
- Hettienne Park as Marissa, one of Emma and Liv's closest friends
- Paul Scheer as Ricky Coo, dance choreographer
- Dennis Parlato as dance instructor
- Billy Unger as additional voices
- Hudson Thames as additional voices
- Colin Ford as additional voices
- Coy Jandreau as Fletcher's Best Man

== Production ==
Raphael and Wilson completed the shooting script of Bride Wars, from an original screenplay by Greg DePaul, before the 2007–2008 Writers Guild of America strike began. Karen McCullah Lutz and Kirsten Smith also contributed to the screenplay.

Some principal photography took place at the Peabody Essex Museum in Salem, Massachusetts. Most filming occurred in Boston, New York City, and Salem, Massachusetts.

=== Music ===
The score to Bride Wars was composed by Edward Shearmur, who recorded his score with a 77-piece ensemble of the Hollywood Studio Symphony at the Newman Scoring Stage at 20th Century Fox.

In the beginning of the film, the song "Somethin' Special" by Colbie Caillat was played, however this version had different lyrics than the Beijing Olympic Mix, suggesting that it was the original mix. As the film did not have a soundtrack, the original version remained unreleased until Caillat's album Breakthrough was released, where the song appears as a bonus track on the Rhapsody edition. There is also the song "Dream" by Priscilla Ahn and "Scared" by Duffy.

== Reception ==
=== Box office ===
In its opening weekend, the film grossed $21.1 million, ranking at number 2 at the box office. It went on to gross $58.7 million in the United States and Canada, $56.7 million in other countries, for a total of $115.4 million worldwide.

=== Critical response ===
On Rotten Tomatoes, the film has an approval rating of 10% based on 144 reviews, with an average rating of 3.50/10. The site's critics consensus reads, "Bride Wars takes the already wearisome concept of battling bridezillas, and makes it thoroughly insufferable via a lazy script and wholly detestable characters." On Metacritic the film has a weighted average score of 24 out of 100 based on 30 critics, indicating "generally unfavorable" reviews. Audiences polled by CinemaScore gave the film an average grade of "A–" on an A+ to F scale. Time named it one of the top 10 worst chick flicks ever made.

Manohla Dargis of The New York Times called the film "dopey, if largely painless". She said that Hathaway's presence meant "that there's a little acting in it, along with a few human emotions" and wondered what the film might have been if the writers had explored a potential lesbian subtext suggested by the opening scenes. Carrie Rickey of The Philadelphia Inquirer wrote, "How bad can a movie be, with Goldilocks Hudson and Cinderella Hathaway? So excruciating that Hudson's sunshine can't warm it and Hathaway's rose redolence can't mask its stink." Ty Burr of The Boston Globe was disturbed by the film, claiming that it was "...a chick flick that makes its chick characters — and by extension its chick audience — look like hateful, backward toddlers, and there is something wrong with that."

Longtime BBC Radio 5 Live critic Mark Kermode was notably harsh toward the film on his Kermode and Mayo's Film Review show, going so far as to say that he would quit film criticism if Bride Wars did not end up in his list of 10 worst films of 2009. By the end of the year, even when Kermode included Terminator Salvation and Couples Retreat on his list by popular demand, Bride Wars still finished eighth, allowing him to keep his job.

In one of the few positive reviews of the film, Time critic Mary Pols wrote, "At least, and this is something to be grateful for, Bride Wars deviates from the usual wedding-flick routine of maids of honor who should be the bride (or groom). And even though the catfighting goes over the top, the notion that a passionate female friendship can turn ugly in a heartbeat is, sadly, realistic."

=== Awards ===
The film was nominated for 2 awards at the 2009 MTV Movie Awards: Best Fight (Anne Hathaway vs. Kate Hudson) and Anne Hathaway for Best Female Performance. It also had several Teen Choice Award nominations. Candice Bergen was nominated for the Razzie Award for Worst Supporting Actress for her performance in the film.

Won

- 2009 – Teen Choice Awards for Choice Comedy Movie Actress (Anne Hathaway)

Nominated

- 2009 – Teen Choice Award for Choice Comedy Movie Actress (Kate Hudson)
- 2009 – Teen Choice Award for Choice Movie Hissy Fit (Kate Hudson)
- 2009 – Teen Choice Award for Choice Movie Rockstar Moment (Anne Hathaway)
- 2009 – Teen Choice Award for Choice Movie Rumble (Anne Hathaway vs. Kate Hudson)
- 2009 – MTV Movie Award for Best Female Performance (Anne Hathaway)
- 2009 – MTV Movie Award for Best Fight (Anne Hathaway vs. Kate Hudson)
- 2010 – Razzie Award for Worst Supporting Actress (Candice Bergen)
- 2010 – People's Choice Awards for Favourite Comedy Movie
