= Mr. Boogedy =

- Genre: Fantasy comedy
- Written by: Michael Janover
- Directed by: Oz Scott
- Starring: Richard Masur; Mimi Kennedy; Benjamin Gregory; David Faustino; Katherine Kelly Lang
- Music by: John Addison
- Country of origin: United States
- Original language: English

Production
- Producer: Steve North
- Cinematography: Robert Stevens
- Editor: Duane Hartzell
- Running time: 45 minutes
- Production company: Walt Disney Television

Original release
- Network: ABC
- Release: April 20, 1986

Related
- Bride of Boogedy

Mr. Boogedy is a 1986 family short film directed by Oz Scott and written by Michael Janover. It was developed as a television pilot and aired on ABC on April 20, 1986, as an episode of The Disney Sunday Movie. A sequel named Bride of Boogedy aired in 1987.

The film tells the story of the Davis family as they move to the New England city of Lucifer Falls, which they soon find to be haunted by ghosts from the colonial period.

The film was made available to stream on Disney+.

== Plot ==
Carlton and Eloise Davis, owners of a gag-gift company, and their children Jennifer, Corwin, and R.E. arrive at their new home in Lucifer Falls, New England. They are greeted by an old man named Neil Witherspoon, who warns them about the house's tragic history and the "Boogedy Man." Later, Jennifer hears someone sneezing and sees a blue light emanating from behind a doorway upstairs, while R.E.'s teddy bear goes missing.

The next morning, Jennifer complains about the strange sneezing, but Carlton reassures her that ghosts aren't real. That night, Jennifer faints after seeing a bright light and hearing maniacal laughter while following the sneezing sound again. When her family wakes her up, she panics and claims she saw the "Boogedy Man." Carlton assumes that it's all part of a gag set up by Mr. Witherspoon.

After Corwin and R.E. witness the kitchen cabinets and appliances move on their own, they go into town with Jennifer to look for Mr. Witherspoon. Amused by the children's curiosity, he tells them the tale of William Hanover, a grouchy old pilgrim man who fell in love with the lovely widow Marion 300 years ago. Hanover struck a deal with the Devil, selling his soul for a magic cloak which granted him mystical powers. He kidnapped Marion's son Jonathan and, casting his first spell, accidentally destroyed his own house, killing himself, Jonathan, and Marion. The Davis house was built in the spot where Hanover's once stood. Hanover, now known as "Boogedy," and Jonathan, who had a cold when he died, are trapped inside the house as spirits, while Marion's is trapped outside, unable to get her child back.

The children return home and tell their parents. As Carlton begins to assure the children that the house isn't haunted, ghostly activity breaks out, frightening the family. Eloise and the children are scared enough to leave, but Carlton convinces them to stay for the night, camped out together in the living room. Eloise wakes up and encounters the ghost of the Widow Marion, who relates her story from outside the back door.

Eloise wakes the rest of the family, and explains to them that Marion told her the only way to get rid of Boogedy is to take away his magic cloak. The Davises arm themselves with household items and head upstairs to search for Boogedy. R.E. hears a noise, and goes off on his own towards the basement; Corwin follows. In the basement, Corwin finds R.E struggling to recover his teddy bear from Jonathan's ghost, who sneezes constantly because he died with a cold. He explains that he "borrowed" it because he was lonely. Feeling sorry for him, R.E. lets him borrow the teddy bear, and Jonathan tells them stories about the previous families that Boogedy chased away. They're interrupted by the arrival of Mr. Boogedy.

The boys run upstairs, reuniting with the rest of their family as Mr. Boogedy appears and attacks them with bolts of electricity and by turning their gag gifts and household appliances against him. In the commotion, a vacuum cleaner snags Boogedy's cloak, pulling it off of him and stripping away his powers. With one last angry scream, he disappears. Corwin takes the cloak out of the vacuum and uses its own power to make it disappear.

Widow Marion and Jonathan appear, having been reunited, and the Davises look on as the ghosts embrace and vanish. As the family now happily agrees that the house is no longer haunted, they hear Boogedy's voice proclaim "Wanna bet?!"

== Cast ==
- Richard Masur as Carlton Davis
- Mimi Kennedy as Eloise Davis
- Benjamin Gregory as Reginald Ernest "R.E." Davis
- David Faustino as Corwin Davis
- Kristy Swanson as Jennifer Davis
- Howard Witt as William Hanover / Mr. Boogedy
- John Astin as Neil Witherspoon
- Katherine Kelly Lang as Widow Marion
- Jaimie McEnnan as Jonathan
- Kedric Wolfe as Satan
