= Saving Silverman =

2001 film by Dennis Dugan

- Theatrical release poster
- Directed by: Dennis Dugan
- Written by: Hank Nelken; Greg DePaul
- Produced by: Neal H. Moritz; Warren Carr
- Starring: Jason Biggs; Steve Zahn; Jack Black; Amanda Peet; R. Lee Ermey; Amanda Detmer; Neil Diamond
- Cinematography: Arthur Albert
- Edited by: Debra Neil-Fisher
- Music by: Mike Simpson
- Production companies: Columbia Pictures; Village Roadshow Pictures; Original Film; NPV Entertainment
- Distributed by: Sony Pictures Releasing
- Release date: February 9, 2001
- Running time: 90 minutes
- Country: United States
- Language: English
- Budget: $22 million
- Box office: $26.1 million

Saving Silverman (internationally titled Evil Woman) is a 2001 American romantic black comedy film directed by Dennis Dugan and starring Jason Biggs, Steve Zahn, Jack Black, and Amanda Peet. Neil Diamond has a cameo role playing himself. The film follows two men who try to save their childhood friend, Darren, from marrying his controlling new girlfriend, whose behavior threatens the friend group, their band, and Darren's chance at happiness with his lifelong true love.

Saving Silverman was released by Sony Pictures Releasing on February 9, 2001. The film was panned by critics, and was a box office disappointment, grossing only $26.1 million worldwide against its $22 million budget.

== Plot ==
Darren Silverman, Wayne LeFessier, and J.D. McNugent, best friends since fifth grade and Neil Diamond fans throughout, form a Neil Diamond tribute band called Diamonds in the Rough.

Through a chance encounter in a local bar after a band gig, Darren meets Judith Fessbeggler, a beautiful but domineering psychologist who shows signs of being emotionally abusive. Six weeks into their relationship, Darren asks her if they could finally have sex, but Judith refuses until marriage. She suggests non-penetrative sex instead, so Darren gets nothing but a sore jaw.

Judith isolates Darren from his friends, demands that he quit the band, receive humiliating medical procedures, and attend relationship counseling under her care. Wayne and J.D. decide to save Darren from her by attempting to bribe her, arm wrestle her, and finally shock her with faked photographs of Darren cheating, all to no avail.

The friends, undaunted, try to reunite Darren with his "one and only" high school sweetheart, Sandy Perkus, when she returns to Seattle before she takes her final vows as a nun. When Darren and Judith announce their engagement, in which Darren would take her last name, Wayne and J.D. kidnap her. However, she discovers the identity of her captors, and the duo are convinced they cannot let her go. Despite sending Darren a fake break-up letter from Judith, Darren is unwilling to forget about her, so Wayne and J.D. stage Judith's fake death using her car and a cadaver dug up from a cemetery and send them over a cliff.

When they visit their high school football coach, Coach Norton, in jail for accidentally killing a referee with a football signal pole in a fit of rage, Norton suggests they just kill her. The pair attempt to shoot Judith, but end up deciding against it. Sandy's feelings for Darren are reawakened, but their attempted date is ruined by his preoccupation with Judith. Sandy, disheartened, returns to the convent, but Darren snaps out of it and runs the 30 miles (48 km) there to win her back.

Chained to an engine block in Wayne's garage, Judith helps J.D. come to terms with the fact that he is gay. Taking advantage of the situation, she knocks him unconscious to steal his keys and escape, only to be chased down and tranquilized by Wayne, an exterminator. Returned to the garage, Judith seduces him into releasing one of her hands and reveals her last fiancé was killed in an underground Muay Thai fight. Coach Norton is paroled and discovers Judith is still alive, so he attempts to kill her and she escapes again. She runs to Darren's house in time to see him kiss Sandy, but shames him into confessing his engagement to her while revealing what really happened to her. Sandy, disappointed, returns to the convent again.

Darren has Wayne and J.D. arrested. Escaping from jail with Coach Norton's help, J.D. and Wayne rush to the convent on the brink of Sandy's final vows as a nun. Convincing her that Darren still loves her, they then kidnap Neil Diamond and urge him to help save Darren from a disastrous marriage and reunite him with Sandy.

At the wedding, Neil stalls the proceedings with the song "Hello Again", to which Darren comes to terms with himself and reunites with Sandy. Wayne and Judith (the latter furious that her wedding is ruined) beat each other up (as love play) only to wind up making out, and J.D. arrives holding Coach in his arms, who coincidentally reveals to J.D. that he too is gay. All three couples then wed onstage at Neil Diamond's concert in which Diamond ministered the reunions: Darren to Sandy, Wayne to Judith, and J.D. to Coach. The show begins as Diamond starts singing with Darren, Wayne, and J.D. playing their instruments while Judith, Sandy, and Norton are the back-up singers.

== Cast ==
- Jason Biggs as Darren Silverman
- Steve Zahn as Wayne LeFessier
- Jack Black as J.D. McNugent
- Amanda Peet as Judith Fessbeggler
- Amanda Detmer as Sandy Perkus
- R. Lee Ermey as Coach Norton
- Neil Diamond as himself
- Kyle Gass as Bar guy
- Christopher Logan as Vagee, Darren's band replacement
- Jared Van Snellenberg as Belston, a Subway employee
- Dennis Dugan as referee (uncredited)

== Production ==
This film falls within a cross-genre film type from the late 1990s and early 2000s in which grooms are saved, or nearly saved, from distasteful marriage. Cast member Jason Biggs said the film is based on "a universal problem" of girlfriends who control who their partners are friends with.

Saving Silverman was filmed in Vancouver, British Columbia from June 7 to August 2000 at a cost of US$22 million. Neil Diamond said humorously, "I was dragged into this project kicking and screaming." He wrote and composed a new song, "I Believe in Happy Endings", for the film.

== Home media ==
Saving Silverman was released in two versions on home video - the PG-13 version that had been released in theaters, and the original R rated cut. The differences between the two versions are mostly dialogue changes and small additions to certain scenes, although two new scenes do appear, with some other scenes in the movie swapped around to compensate for the longer run time. A Blu-ray version was finally released through Mill Creek Entertainment on July 13, 2021, in a bare-bones package that contained no bonus features from the earlier DVD releases. Additionally, this format's packaging claims that the film is PG-13, but actually contains the R-rated cut of the movie.

== Reception ==
Saving Silverman has a score of 18% (an average rating of 3.7 out of 10 based on 102 reviews) on review aggregator Rotten Tomatoes. Its critical consensus states, "Dragged down by a plot lacking any sense of logic and obnoxious, unsympathetic characters, this comedy is more crude and mean-spirited than funny." Metacritic gives it an average score of 22% based on 29 reviews, indicating "generally unfavorable reviews".

The film opened at No. 3 at the North American box office making US$7.4 million in its opening weekend. The film grossed a domestic total of $19,402,030 and $26,086,706 worldwide from a $22 million budget. It opened behind The Wedding Planner and Hannibal, the latter of which opened at the top spot.
