= James Michael Kieran =

3rd President of Hunter College
- In office 1929–1933
- Preceded by: George Samler Davis
- Succeeded by: Eugene A. Colligan

Personal details
- Born: August 23, 1863 New York City, U.S.
- Died: April 25, 1936 (aged 72) New York City, U.S.
- Cause of death: Stroke
- Children: 7, including Helen Reilly and John
- Relatives: Mary McMullen (granddaughter); Ursula Curtiss (granddaughter)

James Michael Kieran (August 23, 1863 – April 25, 1936) was president of Hunter College starting in 1929.

He was born on August 23, 1863, in New York City to Michael Kieran and Catherine Lynch. He married Kate Donahue in 1890 and they had seven children.

He became president of Hunter College on February 1, 1929, replacing George Samler Davis. He was formally installed in office on March 27, 1929. He retired in 1933.

He died on April 25, 1936.
