= Dona Holloway =

American film producer

- Born: Agnes Mae Tweeddale; April 18, 1914; Trinidad, Colorado, USA
- Died: September 27, 1984 (aged 70); West Hollywood, California, USA
- Occupation: Film producer
- Spouse: Louis Lichtenfield

Dona Holloway (born Agnes Mae Tweeddale) was an American film producer who got her start working for Columbia Pictures executive Harry Cohn. She's also known for her professional partnership with William Castle. At the time, she was one of the only female producers in the industry.

== Biography ==
Born in Trinidad, Colorado, but raised in Los Angeles, Agnes Tweeddale was the daughter of Nicholas Tweeddale and Esthel Wilcox. Her father was born in Scotland.

Holloway broke into the business when she was just 16, when she secured a position at William Morris. (She had been attending Los Angeles City College at the time, but left when the job opportunity came up.) After serving as an assistant to WM VP John Hyde, she moved over to Columbia to assist studio chief Harry Cohn in 1949.

"From Harry Cohn, I learned just about every phase of motion picture production, from scripts to casting, filming, editing, dubbing, and scoring," she told a reporter.

In 1958, Cohn died, and Holloway joined Universal as an advisor to the studio's actresses. "Universal had a lot of luck developing young actors … but the girls weren't coming through for them," she'd later explain. "So I was taken on to try and bring out what they had, and did manage to spur the careers of a few anyway, Sandra Dee, Martha Hyer, and Kathryn Grant (Mrs. Bing Crosby), among others."

In 1959, director William Castle—who she had met years earlier—tapped her to join his independent production company. As his associate producer, she was involved with nearly a dozen films in the 1960s.

She was married twice: First to a doctor, and later in life, to Louis Lichtenfield, the head of special effects at Warner Brothers.

== Selected filmography ==
- Riot (1969)
- Rosemary's Baby (1968)
- Project X (1968)
- The Spirit Is Willing (1967)
- The Busy Body (1967)
- Let's Kill Uncle (1966)
- I Saw What You Did (1965)
- The Night Walker (1964)
- Strait-Jacket (1964)
- The Old Dark House (1963)
- 13 Frightened Girls (1963)
- Zotz! (1962)
- Mr. Sardonicus (1961)
- Homicidal (1961)
