= Mary McMullen =

American mystery writer (1920–1986)

- Born: 1920; Yonkers, New York
- Died: 1986 (aged 65–66)
- Other name: Mary Reilly
- Occupation: Mystery writer
- Spouse: Alton Wilson
- Parent(s): Paul Reilly and Helen Reilly
- Relatives: Ursula Curtiss (sister); James Michael Kieran (grandfather); John Kieran (uncle)
- Awards: Edgar Award for best first novel, 1952

Mary McMullen, a pseudonym for Mary Reilly (1920–1986), was an American mystery writer who studied art and worked in fashion design and advertising before becoming an author in 1951. She won the Edgar Allan Poe Award for best first novel, Strangle Hold, in 1952.

Born in Yonkers, New York, in 1920, McMullen was the daughter of Paul Reilly, an artist, and Helen Reilly, a mystery writer who published under the pseudonym Kieran Abbey as well as her own name. McMullen's sister Ursula Curtiss also wrote mysteries.

McMullen died in 1986.

== Bibliography ==
- Strangle Hold (1951) OCLC 1738953
- Death of Miss X (1952) OCLC 30180864
- The Doom Campaign (1974) OCLC 834871
- A Country Kind of Death (1975) OCLC 723673949
- The Pimlico Plot (1975) OCLC 723673503
- Funny, Jonas, You Don't Look Dead (1976) OCLC 732129456
- A Dangerous Funeral (1977) OCLC 2644170
- Death by Bequest (1977) OCLC 3169444
- Prudence Be Damned (1978) OCLC 3630487
- The Man With Fifty Complaints (1978) OCLC 4136612
- Welcome to the Grave (1979) OCLC 4490364
- But Nellie Was So Nice (1979) OCLC 1005145067
- My Cousin Death (1980) OCLC 937645800
- Something of the Night (1980) OCLC 6625560
- The Other Shoe (1981) OCLC 937576826
- Better Off Dead (1982) OCLC 7925232
- Until Death Do Us Part (1982) OCLC 8493563
- A Grave Without Flowers (1983) OCLC 9413479
- The Gift Horse (1985) OCLC 11030290
- The Bad News Man (1986) OCLC 13064698
