= Louis Lichtenfield =

- Born: June 1, 1919; USA
- Died: September 12, 2003 (aged 84); Los Angeles, California, USA
- Occupation: Special effects artist
- Years active: 1956-1980
- Spouse: Dona Holloway

Louis Lichtenfield (June 1, 1919 – September 12, 2003) was an American special effects artist, he was nominated for Best Special Effects at the 30th Academy Awards for the film The Spirit of St. Louis.

== Filmography ==
- The Silver Chalice (1954)
- Helen of Troy (1956)
- The Spirit of St. Louis (1957)
- No Time for Sergeants (1958)
- King Kong (1976)
- Flash Gordon (1980)
