= John Kieran =

American writer and media personality

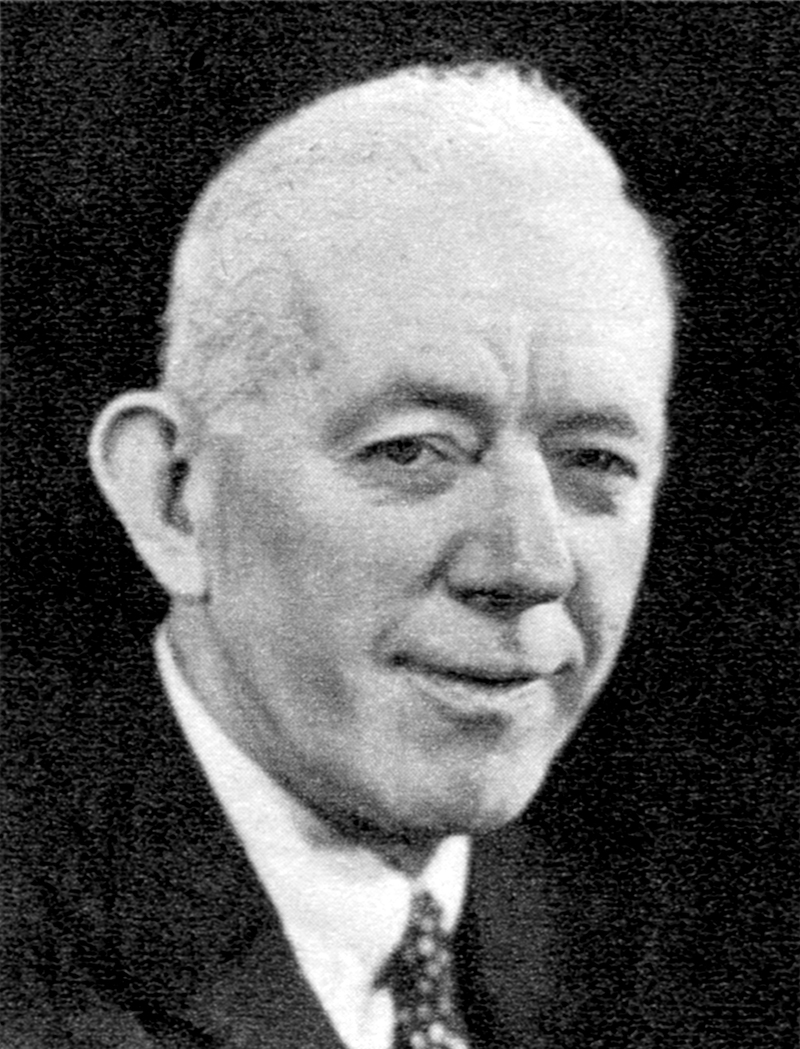
- Kieran in 1947
- Born: August 2, 1892; New York City, US
- Died: December 10, 1981 (aged 89); Rockport, Massachusetts, US
- Education: Fordham University
- Occupations: Journalist, author, media personality
- Spouses: Alma Boldtman (d. 1944); Margaret Ford (m. 1947)
- Parent: James Michael Kieran
- Relatives: Helen Reilly (sister); Mary McMullen (niece); Ursula Curtiss (niece)
- Awards: J. G. Taylor Spink Award (1973)

John Francis Kieran (August 2, 1892 – December 10, 1981) was an American author, journalist, amateur naturalist and radio and television personality.

== Early years ==
A native of The Bronx, Kieran was the son of Dr. James M. Kieran and his wife, Katherine Donahue Kieran. Both of his parents were teachers, and his father was at one time president of Hunter College. He had three sisters and three brothers.

Kieran earned a Bachelor of Science degree (cum laude) from Fordham University. After graduating, he became a poultry farmer and taught school.

== Career ==
Kieran began his newspaper career in 1915 as a sportswriter for The New York Times. He continued on the sports beat during his entire career, working for a number of New York City newspapers and becoming one of the country's best known sports columnists. On January 4, 1943, his column moved to The New York Sun. During his 1927–1943 tenure as The Times' senior sports columnist, he was profiled in the January 9, 1939, issue of Time magazine, which described him as "short, wiry, grey, bristly and brilliant".

Although Kieran is widely credited with first applying the term "grand slam" to tennis, to describe the winning of all four major tennis tournaments in a calendar year, sports columnist Alan Gould had used the term in that connection almost two months before Kieran.

A noted "intellectual", he gained extensive personal popularity with his 10-year stint as a panelist on NBC's most widely heard radio quiz program Information, Please! (May 17, 1938 – June 25, 1948). His seemingly encyclopedic erudition and quick wit, combined with an aura of gentle modesty, endeared him to the listening audience and assured his place on the show. Along with fellow "intellectuals" Franklin P. Adams and host Clifton Fadiman, Kieran entertained and educated radio audiences through the Great Depression, World War II and the Cold War.

Eight months after Information, Please! ended, Kieran became the writer and host of John Kieran’s Kaleidoscope, a 15-minute television programme produced from February 1949 to April 1952. Its 104 episodes covered subjects including insect mating, magnetic attraction and theories about the formation of the Solar System.[5]

Kieran became a familiar face on 1950s television, guesting on numerous panel and quiz shows, including CBS' 13-week revival of Information, Please! as a 1952 summer replacement show, the only time it would be seen on TV.

Kieran was an avid birdwatcher and observer of the natural environment. He lived in Riverdale, in the northwest Bronx, and documented changes in the local landscape during a period of post-World War II residential development that reduced many formerly undeveloped areas.

His 1959 book A Natural History of New York City describes wildlife and geography within the city, including birds, reptiles, fish, and mammals observed in a variety of urban habitats.

In 1964, at the age of 73, Kieran published his autobiography, Not Under Oath.

In 1972, his story “The City Fox” was adapted into an episode of the The Wonderful World of Disney.

== Personal life ==
Kieran married Margaret Ford, a feature writer, September 15, 1947, in Brookline, Massachusetts. She was his second wife, his first wife having died five years earlier. A son, John Kieran Jr. (1921–2000), also appeared on 1950s TV, including a stint as a regular panelist in 1955 on another long-running quiz show, Down You Go. Kieran died on December 10, 1981, in Rockport, Massachusetts, at the age of 89 and is buried at Beech Grove Cemetery in Rockport.

== Recognition ==
Kieran was inducted in the National Sportscasters and Sportswriters Association Hall of Fame in 1971. In 1973, Kieran was honored by the Baseball Writers' Association of America with the J. G. Taylor Spink Award for distinguished baseball writing. Recipients of the Spink Award are recognized at the National Baseball Hall of Fame and Museum in what is commonly referred to as the "writers wing" of the Hall of Fame. In 1987, six years after his death, the New York City Parks Department inaugurated The John Kieran Nature Trail, which runs along some of the most scenic areas of the Bronx's Van Cortlandt Park. The trail is part of the former Putnam Division of the New York Central Railroad.

== Books ==
- The Story of the Olympic Games
- The American Sporting Scene
- Footnotes on Nature
- Nature Notes
- John James Audubon, co-authored with his wife Margaret Kieran
- An Introduction to Nature (1946), Garden City, New York: Doubleday & Company, Inc. (Revised editions: 1948, 1950, 1952, 1954, 1955, 1966)
- An Introduction to Wildflowers (1965), Garden City, New York: Doubleday & Company, Inc.
- An Introduction to Trees (1954), Garden City, New York: Doubleday & Company, Inc.
- A Natural History of New York City (1959)
- Not Under Oath (1964), Boston: Houghton Mifflin Co., his autobiography
- Books I Love; Being a Selection of 100 Titles for a Home Library, with Added Comment on Other Books, Many Authors and the Delights of Reading (1969) Garden City, New York: Doubleday.
- Poems I Remember: An Anthology of My Favorite Poems (1942), Garden City, New York: Doubleday & Company, Inc.
- An Introduction to Birds (1946, 1950), Garden City, New York: Doubleday & Company, Inc.

== Sources ==
- Kieran, John (1964). Not Under Oath. Boston: Houghton Mifflin Co.
- Zerby, Jack. "John F. Kieran," SABR Baseball Biography Project. SABR.org.
