= Mama's Boy =

- Theatrical release poster
- Directed by: Tim Hamilton
- Written by: Hank Nelken
- Produced by: Heidi Santelli; Steve Carr
- Starring: Jon Heder; Diane Keaton; Jeff Daniels; Anna Faris; Eli Wallach
- Cinematography: Jonathan Brown
- Edited by: Amy E. Duddleston
- Music by: Mark Mothersbaugh
- Production company: Carr-Santelli Productions
- Distributed by: Warner Bros. Pictures
- Release date: December 21, 2007
- Running time: 93 minutes
- Country: United States
- Language: English
- Box office: $688,145

Mama's Boy is a 2007 American comedy-drama film starring Diane Keaton and Jon Heder, and features music by Mark Mothersbaugh. The film was distributed by Warner Bros. Pictures for a limited release to certain regions of the United States.

== Plot ==
Eccentric Jeffrey Mannus is a 29-year-old book store clerk who still lives with his mother, Jan. Jeffrey's father died when Jeffrey was young, so he has clung to his mother tightly. Jeffrey sees no reason to alter his current arrangement, but his world is upended when Jan meets Mert Rosenbloom, a motivational speaker.

Mert woos Jan after she attends one of his talks on the power of positivity. Mert moves in on what Jeffrey perceives as his territory, something Jeffrey will not tolerate. While at a coffee shop, Jeffrey finds friendship in one of the workers, aspiring singer-songwriter, Nora Flannagan. They share a cynical, negative perception of the world.

Jeffrey asks a man working in a computer shop to dig up dirt on Mert. Jeffrey pays the man half the price they'd agreed upon when Mert comes into the shop to buy bribes to win Jeffrey over. The shop worker announces Jeffery's plan to dig up dirt on him, to Mert. Mert immediately changes his tactics, declaring "war" against Jeffrey.

Upon Mert's suggestion, Jan moves Jeffrey out of Jeffrey's bedroom and into the basement. When Jan and Mert begin making audible noises during intimacy, Jeffrey, disgusted, leaves to attend one of Nora's gigs. Initially cold to him, once he apologizes, they go get coffee together. Upon dropping Jeffrey off at his home, Mert invites Nora to a bbq at his house on the weekend.

At Mert's house that weekend, Jan is extremely enthusiastic when Nora comes. She shows her old photos of Jeffrey when he was a child, and she sees he has always had weight and attachment issues. Mert and Jeffrey make disparaging remarks at one another the whole time, and Mert also insinuates that Nora is not trying hard enough to be a success.

The animosity escalates over the following days with both men pranking one another. Jan and Mert then announce their engagement and that they are going to sell Jan's house for something smaller. Desperate for help, Jeffrey interrupts Nora's recording of her demo to enlist her aid to follow a lead in Arizona. Maya Sinclair turns out to be Mert's estranged daughter, who Mert abandoned when she was 12. Nora is furious when she discovers that Jeffrey used her to get rid of Mert.

Something unprecedented happens —Jeffrey discovers his inner self. However, before this happens, Jeffrey and Mert get into a fist fight in Jan's home, causing her to break up with Mert when she hears about Maya. Jeffrey is pleased, but Jan kicks him out of the house. Jeffrey goes to find Nora, who is still upset with him for being such a "jerk"; she does not offer any help.

Jeffrey lives on the streets, but is eventually arrested for urinating in a sink. Seymour, his former boss from the bookstore, comes to the rescue and pays his bail, also allowing him to move in with him. Jeffrey realizes his errors and fights to get Jan and Mert back together. After achieving this, he goes to stop the bus that Nora is travelling on, as she is leaving for college, in his new car. He parks it in the middle of the road and stands on the hood, holding up a radio that is playing one of Nora's favorite songs. The bus driver makes Nora talk to him and they make up. They then drive off into the distance.

== Cast ==
- Jon Heder as Jeffrey Mannus
- Diane Keaton as Jan Mannus
- Jeff Daniels as Mert Jacob Rosenbloom
- Anna Faris as Nora Flannagan
- Sarah Chalke as Maya
- Dorian Missick as Mitch
- Eli Wallach as Seymour Warburton
- Mary Kay Place as Barbera
- Simon Helberg as Rathkon

== Reception ==
The film was greatly panned by critics, receiving a Rotten Tomatoes critic score of 8% based on 11 reviews, with an average rating of 3.4/10.

The film made $688,145 in foreign markets.
