= Helen Reilly =

American mystery writer (1891–1962)

- Born: April 25, 1891; New York City
- Died: January 11, 1962 (aged 70); Albuquerque, New Mexico
- Other name: Kieran Abbey
- Education: Hunter College
- Occupation: Mystery writer
- Organizations: Mystery Writers of America (president, 1953)
- Spouse: Paul Reilly (1914–1944)
- Children: 4, including Mary McMullen and Ursula Curtiss
- Parent: James Michael Kieran
- Relatives: John Kieran (brother)

Helen Reilly (April 25, 1891 – January 11, 1962), was an American mystery writer known for a series of novels featuring Inspector Christopher McKee, head of the fictitious Manhattan Homicide Squad. She wrote mostly under her own name but also under the pseudonym Kieran Abbey. A member of the Mystery Writers of America, she served as its president in 1953.

Born Helen Kieran in New York City in 1891, she attended Hunter College, graduating in 1914. In that same year, she married Paul Reilly, an artist. Two of their four daughters, Ursula Curtiss and Mary McMullen, also became published mystery writers.

Reilly died on January 11, 1962, in Albuquerque, New Mexico. She was preceded in death by her husband in 1944.

== Bibliography ==
=== Inspector McKee series ===
- The Diamond Feather (1930) OCLC 504795318
- Murder in the Mews (1931) OCLC 8944856
- The Line-Up (1934) OCLC 3798270
- McKee of Centre Street (1934) OCLC 1802275
- Mr. Smith's Hat: A Case for Inspector McKee (1936) OCLC 14688393
- Dead Man Control (1936) OCLC 952071648
- All Concerned Notified (1940) OCLC 7581303
- Dead for a Ducat (1939) OCLC 3370752
- The Dead Can Tell (1940) OCLC 23246016
- Death Demands an Audience (1940) OCLC 3298901
- Murder in Shinbone Alley (1940) OCLC 5319892
- Mourned on Sunday (1941) OCLC 3519813
- Three Women in Black (1941) OCLC 1377119
- Name Your Poison (1942) OCLC 8365275
- The Opening Door (1944) OCLC 1610473
- Murder on Angler's Island (1945) OCLC 1084376
- The Silver Leopard (1946) OCLC 587229702
- The Farmhouse (1947) OCLC 1610452
- Staircase 4 (1949) OCLC 1608993
- Murder at Arroways (1950) OCLC 1609493
- Lament for the Bride (1951) OCLC 1609510
- The Double Man (1952) OCLC 1609025
- The Velvet Hand (1953) OCLC 1382629
- Tell Her It's Murder (1954) OCLC 1382605
- Compartment K: Murder Rides a Canadian Transcontinental Express (1955) OCLC 1407194
- The Canvas Dagger (1956) OCLC 2740455
- Ding, Dong, Bell (1958) OCLC 1998745
- Not Me, Inspector (1959) OCLC 1803116
- Follow Me (1960) OCLC 1803139
- Certain Sleep (1961) OCLC 1279670
- The Day She Died (1962) OCLC 755284167

=== Other mysteries ===
- The Thirty-first Bullfinch (1930) OCLC 1802533
- Man with the Painted Head (1931) OCLC 877319274
- The Doll's Trunk Murder (1932) OCLC 5510686
- File on Rufus Ray (1937) OCLC 504795357

As Kieran Abbey

- Run with the Hare (1941) OCLC 7997553
- And Let the Coffin Pass (1942) OCLC 8209892
- Beyond the Dark (1944) OCLC 4237182
