= Howard Witt =

American actor (1932–2017)

- Born: March 13, 1932; Chicago, Illinois, U.S.
- Died: June 21, 2017 (aged 85); Chicago, Illinois, U.S.
- Education: Art Institute of Chicago
- Occupation: Actor
- Years active: 1965–2017
- Children: Robin Witt

Howard Witt (March 13, 1932 – June 21, 2017) was an American character actor and Chicago native who began his acting career in the Goodman Theatre.

== Early years ==
Witt attended Von Steuben High School and was a drama student at Goodman School of Drama at the Art Institute of Chicago (now at DePaul University).

== Career ==
After Witt's career began at the Goodman Theatre, he gained additional acting experience at the Woodstock Playhouse in New York State and at the Arena Stage in Washington, D.C. His Broadway performances included Glengarry Glen Ross.

After divorcing his wife in the mid-1970s, Witt moved to Hollywood. He had appeared as a guest star in many television series including Kojak, The Bob Newhart Show, Rhoda, The Rockford Files, Eight Is Enough, WKRP in Cincinnati, Alice, Archie Bunker's Place, Hill Street Blues, Taxi, Remington Steele, Murder, She Wrote, St. Elsewhere, Knots Landing, The Golden Girls, and Law & Order.

He also appeared in a few made for telefilms including Disney's Mr. Boogedy (as William Hanover/title character) and its sequel Bride of Boogedy in the late 1980s.

He was nominated for a Tony Award in 1999 for his portrayal of Charley in the Broadway revival of Arthur Miller's Death of a Salesman. Witt is an alumnus at DePaul University's Theatre School.

== Personal life ==
He was the father of Chicago director Robin Witt, who is an associate professor of directing at University of North Carolina at Charlotte. He also had another daughter, Deborah, and a son, Joshua.

He divorced his wife in the mid-1970s.

== Health and death ==
Witt had a heart attack in 2002 while he was playing the part of Kit Carson in Steppenwolf Theatre Company's production of The Time of Your Life. He died in Chicago on June 21, 2017, of natural causes at the age of 85.

== Filmography ==
Year	Title	Role	Notes
1982	Lookin' to Get Out	Sid Dorfman - Man Interrupted by Jerry While Talking to Patti	
1984	Sam's Son	Cy Martin	
1987	The Golden Girls	Hunter McCoy	episode "Diamond in the rough"
1991	Age Isn't Everything		
1991	Law & Order	Gruen	episode "The Wages of Love"
