= Steep Theatre Company =

Steep Theatre Company is a not-for-profit theatre company located in the Edgewater neighborhood of Chicago, Illinois. Founded in 2000 by Peter Moore, Alex Gillmor, and Alex Gualino, Steep has become known as one of Chicago's iconic ensemble-based storefront theatres. Chicago is known for its brand of bold, collaborative, and actor-driven theatre in intimate venues scattered throughout the city's many neighborhoods, and Steep is an embodiment of this theatrical movement. The ensemble has produced over 60 plays and cultivated a growing community of artists and audience members. In 2019, through a gift from the Bayless Family Foundation, Steep announced it would become an Equity theater.

== Current Season ==
=== 2018–2019 ===
Zürich by Amelia Roper

Red Rex by Ike Holter

First Love is the Revolution by Rita Kalnejais

Pomona by Alistair McDowall

== History ==
After two years of producing plays as an itinerant company, Steep opened its first storefront theatre in the Wrigleyville neighborhood of Chicago. Over the years, Steep has grown from an original founding of three actors into an ensemble of 41 artists driven by a shared commitment to their mission: "To bring out the everyday truths in the stories we tell through ensemble work and to reach out to non-traditional theater goers by seeking out stories and creating experiences relevant to them."

In October 2008, Steep moved to a new storefront – a newly renovated theatre in Chicago's Edgewater neighborhood. This black box theatre seats approximately 55 people.

In 2015, Steep Theatre produced the National Premiere of "Martyr" by Marius Von Mayenburg. In 2016, The Student based much of its imagery off of Steep Theatre's production including the use of Chalk art in its poster

In addition to the mainstage theater, Steep operates a bar and small cabaret-style performance space in the adjoining storefront. This space, The Boxcar, opened to the public in August 2018. It features free programmed performances Sunday and Monday evenings. Steep Ensemble Member Thomas Dixon serves as The Boxcar's Artistic Curator.

== Ensemble Members and Artistic Associates ==
=== Ensemble ===
Steep Theatre Company members include actors, directors, artists, writers, and other theatre artists.

- James Allen
- Jonathan Berry
- Lucy Carapetyan
- George Cederquist
- Matt Chapman
- Brad DeFabo Akin
- Maria DeFabo Akin
- Thomas Dixon
- Patricia Donegan
- Peter Dully
- Jonathan Edwards
- Nate Faust
- Alex Gillmor
- Nick Horst
- Lauren Lassus
- Ashleigh LaThrop
- Cynthia Marker
- Peter Moore
- Caroline Neff
- Jim Poole
- Egan Reich
- Joel Reitsma
- Melissa Riemer
- Brandon Rivera
- Michael Salinas
- Amber Sallis
- Joanie Schultz
- Julia Siple
- Sasha Smith
- Kendra Thulin
- Robin Witt
- Brendan Melanson
in memoriam

=== Artistic Associates ===
- Catherine Allen
- Kristin Leahey
- Emily McConnell
- Jon Ravenscroft
- Alison Siple
- Simon Stephens

Assoc. Playwright

- Dan Stratton
- Brandon Wardell
- Chelsea M. Warren
- Ellen Willett

== Productions ==
† indicates World Premiere production

‡ indicates U.S. Premiere production

Season 1 (2001–02)

- Life During Wartime by Keith Reddin
- Search and Destroy by Howard Korder
- Pvt. Wars by James McLure
- †These Flowers are for My Mother by Michael McGuire
- Geography of a Horse Dreamer by Sam Shepard

Season 2 (2002–03)

- ‡The Aspidistra Code by Mark O’Rowe
- The Job by Shem Bitterman
- My Donkey Lady by John Wilson
- Below the Belt by Richard Dresser
- The Hot House by Harold Pinter

Season 3 (2004)

- The Time Trial by Jack Gilhooley
- Dealer’s Choice by Patrick Marber

Season 4 (2004–05)

- Howie the Rookie by Mark O’Rowe
- Incident at Vichy by Arthur Miller
- Book of Days by Lanford Wilson
- †Pleasanton by John Wilson

Season 5 (2005–06)

- Catch-22 by Joseph Heller
- The Night Heron by Jez Butterworth
- Of Mice and Men by John Steinbeck
- Bang the Drum Slowly by Mark Harris, adapted by Eric Simonson

Season 6 (2006–07)

- The Last Days of Judas Iscariot by Stephen Adly Guirgis
- Otherwise Engaged by Simon Gray
- The Resistible Rise of Arturo Ui by Bertolt Brecht
- Insignificance by Terry Johnson

Season 7 (2007–08)

- Coronado by Dennis Lehane
- Breathing Corpses by Laura Wade
- Greensboro: A Requiem by Emily Mann

Season 8 (2008 – 09)

- †Seven Days by Egan Reich
- In Arabia We’d All Be Kings by Stephen Adly Gurgis
- Parlour Song by Jez Butterworth
- The Hollow Lands by Howard Korder

Season 9 (2009–10)

- Kill the Old Torture Their Young by David Harrower
- ‡Harper Regan by Simon Stephens
- ‡2,000 Feet Away by Anthony Weigh

Season 10 (2010–11)

- A Brief History of Helen of Troy by Mark Shultz
- Lakeboat by David Mamet
- Festen by David Elridge, Thomas Vinterberg, Morgan Rukov, Bo Hr. Hansen
- Pornography by Simon Stephens

Season 11 (2011–12)

- Under the Blue Sky by David Eldridge
- Love and Money by Dennis Kelly
- The Receptionist by Adam Bock
- ‡Moment by Dierdre Kinahan

Season 12 (2012–13)

- Making Noise Quietly by Robert Holman
- Luther by Ethan Lipton
- ‡The Knowledge by John Donnelly
- Fallow by Kenneth Lin

Season 13 (2013–14)

- ‡Motortown by Simon Stephens
- strangers, babies by Linda McLean
- If There Is I Haven’t Found It Yet by Nick Payne
- A Small Fire by Adam Bock

Season 14 (2014–15)

- The Vandal by Hamish Linklater
- The Life and Sort of Death of Eric Argyle by Ross Dungan
- ‡Martyr by Marius von Mayenburg
- ‡Brilliant Adventures by Alistair McDowall

Season 15 (2015–16)

- †The Cheats by Hamish Linklater
- Posh by Laura Wade
- The Few by Samuel D. Hunter
- ‡Wastwater by Simon Stephens

Season 16 (2016–17)

- †Bobbie Clearly by Alex Lubischer
- Earthquakes in London by Mike Bartlett
- Hookman by Lauren Yee
- ‡Lela & Co. by Cordelia Lynn

Season 17 (2017–18)

- The Invisible Hand by Ayad Akhtar
- †Hinter by Calamity West
- ‡Birdland by Simon Stephens
- Linda by Penelope Skinner

== Awards and nominations ==
Steep was named 2010 Broadway in Chicago Emerging Theatre Award winner.

=== Jeff Awards ===
Year	Work	Category	Artist	Result
2006	Book of Days	Ensemble	N/A	Nominated
2006	Book of Days	Actress in a Principal Role	Krista Forster	Nominated
2008	The Resistible Rise of Arturo Ui	Production – Play	N/A	Nominated
2009	Greensboro: A Requiem	Actress in a Supporting Role	Lily Mojekwu	Nominated
2009	In Arabia We'd All Be Kings	Actress in a Supporting Role	Rinska Prestinary	Nominated
2009	In Arabia We'd All Be Kings	Ensemble	N/A	Won
2009	In Arabia We'd All Be Kings	Director – Play	Joanie Schultz	Nominated
2009	In Arabia We'd All Be Kings	Production – Play	N/A	Nominated
2010	Harper Regan	Actress in a Principal Role	Kendra Thulin	Won
2011	A Brief History of Helen of Troy	Actress in a Principal Role	Caroline Neff	Won
2012	Under the Blue Sky	Actress in a Supporting Role	Caroline Neff	Nominated
2013	The Receptionist	Actress in a Principal Role	Cheryl Roy	Nominated
2013	Moment	Ensemble	N/A	Nominated
2013	Moment	Production – Director	Jonathan Berry	Nominated
2014	The Knowledge	Production – Play	N/A	Nominated
2014	The Knowledge	Production – Director	Jonathan Berry	Nominated
2014	The Knowledge	Ensemble	N/A	Nominated
2014	The Knowledge	Actress in a Principal Role	Caroline Neff	Nominated
2014	Motortown	Actor in a Principal Role	Joel Reitsma	Nominated
2014	Motortown	Actress in a Supporting Role	Ashleigh LaThrop	Nominated
2014	Fallow	Actor in a Supporting Role	Jose Antonio Garcia	Nominated
2015	The Vandal	Actor in a Principal Role	Kendra Thulin	Nominated
2015	The Vandal	Actor in a Supporting Role	Jack Miggins	Nominated
2015	If There Is I Haven't Found It Yet	Actor in a Supporting Role	Shane Kenyon	Won
2016	Posh	Production – Play	N/A	Nominated
2016	Posh	Ensemble	N/A	Won
2016	Posh	Director – Play	Jonathan Berry	Nominated
2017	Wastwater	Actress in a Supporting Role	Kendra Thulin	Nominated
2017	Wastwater	Sound Design	Thomas Dixon	Nominated
2017	Bobbie Clearly	New Play	Alex Lubischer	Won
2018	Lela & Co.	Production – Play	N/A	Won
2018	Lela & Co.	Director – Play	Robin Witt	Won
2018	Lela & Co.	Performer in a Principal Role – Play	Cruz Gonzalez-Cadel	Won
2018	Lela & Co.	Performer in a Supporting Role – Play	Chris Chmelik	Nominated
2018	Lela & Co.	Scenic Design	Joe Schermoly	Nominated
2018	Lela & Co.	Lighting Design	Brandon Wardell	Nominated
2018	The Invisible Hand	Production – Play	N/A	Nominated
2018	The Invisible Hand	Director – Play	Audrey Francis	Nominated
2018	The Invisible Hand	Performer in a Principal Role – Play	Joel Reitsma	Nominated
2018	The Invisible Hand	Performer in a Supporting Role – Play	Owais Ahmed	Won
2018	The Invisible Hand	Sound Design	Thomas Dixon	Nominated
