= Harper Regan =

Play written by Simon Stephens

Harper Regan is a two-act play by Simon Stephens that premiered at the National Theatre in 2008.

== Setting ==
Set in UK, Autumn of 2006 : from Uxbridge to Stockport to Manchester and back.

== Synopsis ==
One woman's struggle with the difficulties of her personal and family life.

At forty one, Harper Regan suddenly leaves her family in the suburbs of West London and sets off on a mission to see her father before he dies. Her journey becomes a road trip through the heart of England in this violent and comic exploration of the moralities of sex and death. It explores Harper's relationship with her daughter, husband and mother.

== Production history ==
=== UK ===
Premiered at the National Theatre in 2008. With Lesley Sharp as Harper Regan.

Character	Original Cast, National Theatre 2008
Harper Regan	Lesley Sharp
Duncan Woolley	Eamon Boland
Alison Woolley	Susan Brown
James Fortune	Brian Capron
Mickey Nestor	Jack Deam
Tobias Rich	Troy Glasgow
Justine Ross	Jessica Harris
Mahesh Aslam	Nitin Kundra
Elwood Barnes	Michael Mears
Sarah Regan	Jessica Raine
Seth Regan	Nick Sidi

=== Israel ===
Premiered at the Gesher Theater in Tel Aviv in November 2009 under the direction of Oded Kotler, with Laura Rivlin in the principal role.

=== United States ===
Premiered at Steep Theatre in Chicago, Illinois in January 2010 under the direction of Robin Witt, with Kendra Thulin playing the title role. The New York premiere was presented Off-Broadway by the Atlantic Theater Company in October 2012 at the Linda Gross Theater. Directed by Gaye Taylor Upchurch, the cast included Mary McCann in the title role, Mary Beth Peil as Alison Woolley, John Sharian as Duncan Woolley, Peter Scanavino as Mickey Nestor, Christopher Innvar as James Fortune, Mahira Kakkar as Justine Ross, Jordan Lage as Elwood Barnes, Madeleine Martin as Sarah Regan, Gareth Sake as Seth Regan, and Stephen Tyrone Williams as Tobias Rich.

=== Canada ===
Premiere at Canada Stage in Toronto, Ontario in March 2015 under the direction of Matthew Jocelyn, with Molly Parker playing the title role.

=== Austria ===
Premiere at Off-Theater in Vienna in January 2017 under the direction of Markus Emil Felkel, with Pilar Aguilera playing the title role.
