= Hank Nelken =

American screenwriter

Hank Nelken is an American screenwriter.

== Biography ==
Nelken was born in Greenville, Mississippi and went to high school in Dallas, Texas. He started a video business as a teenager, shooting weddings and Bar/Bat Mitzvahs. He studied at USC School of Cinema-Television. While at USC, Nelken directed numerous short films, including Lets Do Love, a satire set in the future about two people who fall in love but never meet.

== Career ==
Nelken wrote and directed Fifteen Minutes, a short film that premiered at the USC First Look Festival. Afterwards, he partnered with Greg DePaul. From 1998 to 2001, Nelken and DePaul wrote several screenplays, including Saving Silverman released in 2001. Afterwards, Nelken and DePaul split and Nelken wrote Mama's Boy, a spec screenplay that was purchased in 2003 by Warner Brothers. Mama's Boy was produced in 2007 by Warner Independent Pictures and starred Jon Heder, Diane Keaton, Jeff Daniels and Anna Faris. A spec project, a modern adaptation of Mr. Blandings Builds His Dream House, got turned into Are We Done Yet? starring Ice Cube, a sequel to Are We There Yet?.

In 2016, Nelken was set to write a feature film about Speedy Gonzales for Warner Bros, with Mexican actor Eugenio Derbez attached to star and produce.

Nelken has sold several television projects, and also taught screenwriting at UCLA.
