= Greg DePaul =

American dramatist

Greg DePaul is an American playwright and screenwriter, best known for the romantic comedy Bride Wars.

== Biography ==
DePaul grew up in Maryland and graduated from NYU. After college, he worked as a private investigator and wrote for The Washington Post. In 1997, DePaul moved to Los Angeles, where he directed his own play, Motherlove, whose cast included Joe Reitman and Karen Tarleton. Back Stage West reviewer Paul Birchall described the play as "scathingly funny and wickedly inventive." DePaul teamed with writer Hank Nelken to create a comic short film, Jerry Mashugana, a parody of the hit comedy Jerry Maguire, which starred Matt Damon, Geoffrey Rush and Demi Moore.

== Career ==
DePaul wrote Saving Silverman, starring Jack Black and Jason Biggs, which was released by Sony Pictures in 2001. It opened at No. 3 at the North American box office making $7.4 million USD in its opening weekend. The film grossed a domestic total of $19,402,030 and $26,086,706 worldwide from a $22 million budget. Killer Bud, was produced independently.

He then wrote Bride Wars, starring Kate Hudson, Anne Hathaway and Candace Bergen. DePaul got the idea when he and his wife were planning a double wedding with her sister. In its opening weekend, the film grossed $21,058,173 ranking #2 at the box office. A Chinese remake of the same name was released in 2015.

DePaul's plays and sketch comedy have been performed by The Collective NY, a theatre company in Manhattan. He has performed improv comedy and co-founded Cornfed. DePaul has served on the Board of the Writers and Actors Lab, and co-founded The Clark Street Players.

He wrote the comedy screenwriting manual, Bring the Funny: The Essential Companion for the Comedy Screenwriter. He also led a screenwriting workshop for Harvardwood, a group of Harvard alumni in the entertainment industry, and taught Screenwriting at NYU, The New School, and Savannah College of Art and Design.
