= Simon Stephens =

British playwright (born 1971)

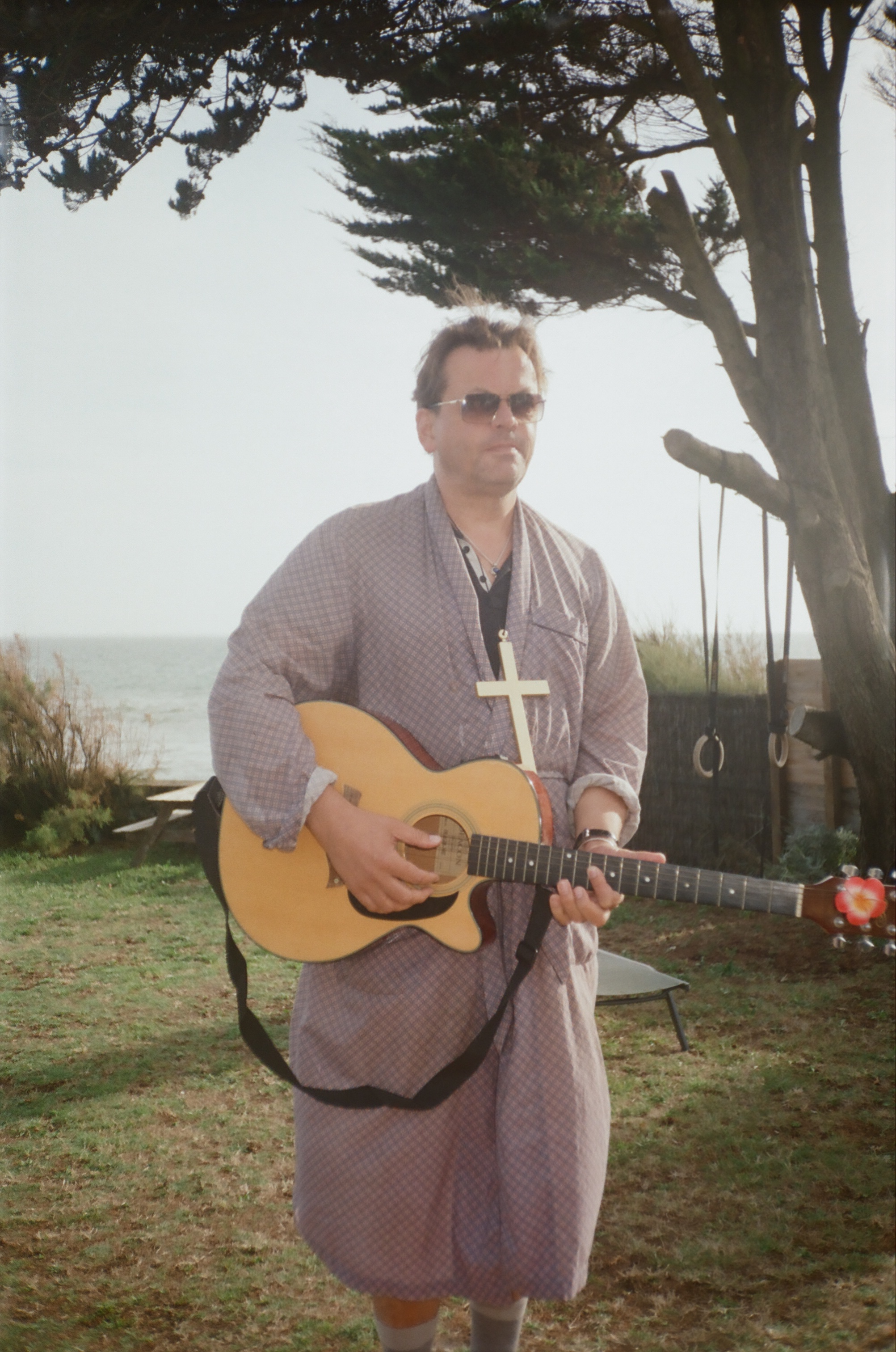
- Simon Stephens officiating a wedding in France (August 2023)
- Born: 6 February 1971 (age 55); Manchester, England
- Occupation: Playwright
- Spouse: Polly Heath

Simon Stephens (born 6 February 1971) is a British-Irish playwright, musician and Professor of Scriptwriting at Manchester Metropolitan University. Having taught on the Young Writers' Programme at the Royal Court Theatre for many years, he is now an Artistic Associate at the Lyric Hammersmith. He is the inaugural Associate Playwright of Steep Theatre Company, Chicago, where five of his plays, Harper Regan, Motortown, Wastwater, Birdland, and Light Falls had their U.S. premieres. His writing is widely performed throughout Europe and, along with Dennis Kelly and Martin Crimp, he is one of the most performed English-language writers in Germany.

== Life ==
Originally from Stockport, Greater Manchester, Stephens graduated from the University of York with a degree in History. After university, he lived in Edinburgh for several years, where he met his future wife Polly, before later completing a PGCE at the Institute of Education. He worked as a teacher for a few years, before leaving to become a playwright. In 2017, Stephens was appointed to a Professorship at the Manchester School of Writing, at Manchester Metropolitan University.

He was a member of Scottish art punk band Country Teasers.

Stephens lives in London with his wife and three children. He has three cats, a dog, a snake and a capybara as pets. In 2016, Stephens published A Working Diary, an account of his activities in 2014.

== Plays ==
- A Slow Fire - premiered at the Jermyn Street Theatre. Directed by Rex Ryan. Starring Ross Gaynor, Fionn Ó Loingsigh and Ian Toner.
- An Ark (2026) - Premiered at The Shed and directed by Sarah Frankcom. Starring Ian McKellen, Golda Rosheuvel, Arinze Kene and Rosie Sheehy. NB. This play is a mixed reality show.
- Men's Business (2025) - translated from Franz Xaver Kroetz. Premiered at the Finborough Theatre, directed by Ross Gaynor. Performed by Lauren Farrell and Rex Ryan.
- Vanya (2023). Premiered at Duke Of York’s Theatre, directed by Sam Yates. Adaptation of Uncle Vanya by Anton Chekhov. Performed by Andrew Scott.
- Morning Sun (2021). Manhattan Theatre Club production premiered in October 2021 at New York City Center Stage I directed by Lila Neugebauer, with Blair Brown, Edie Falco, and Marin Ireland.
- Blindness (2020). Premiered at Donmar Warehouse, directed by Walter Meierjohann. Adaptation of José Saramago's novel of the same name.
- Fortune (2020). Premiered at Tokyo Metropolitan Theatre, directed by Sean Holmes
- Light Falls (2019). Premiered at Royal Exchange Manchester, directed by Sarah Francomb. Irish Premier in Cork School of Music, directed by Regina Crowley.
- Rage (2018) premiered at the Royal Welsh College of Music & Drama, directed by Elle While Revival cast premiere at the University of Wales Trinity Saint David (2020)
- Obsession (2017). (English translation of Jan Peter Gerrits' play) Premiered at the Barbican Centre, directed by Ivo Van Hove
- The Seagull (2017). Premiered at the Lyric Hammersmith, directed by Sean Holmes
- Fatherland (2017). Co-created with Frantic Assembly's Scott Graham and Karl Hyde for the Manchester International Festival at the Royal Exchange.
- The Threepenny Opera (2016) premiered at the National Theatre, directed by Rufus Norris, a new adaptation of Bertolt Brecht's book and lyrics (music by Kurt Weill)
- Heisenberg (2015) premiered Off-Broadway at the New York City Center-Stage II, directed by Mark Brokaw
- Song From Far Away (2015) premiered at the Young Vic, directed by Ivo van Hove
- The Cherry Orchard (2014) premiering at the Young Vic, directed by Katie Mitchell
- Carmen Disruption (2014) premiering at Deutsches Schauspielhaus, directed by Sebastian Nübling
- Blindsided (2014) premiered at the Royal Exchange Theatre, directed by Sarah Frankcom
- Birdland (2014) premiered at the Royal Court Theatre, directed by Carrie Cracknell
- London (2012) incorporating Sea Wall and T5 premiered at Salisbury Playhouse, directed by George Perrin
- Morning (2012) premiered at the Traverse Theatre, directed by Sean Holmes
- The Curious Incident of the Dog in the Night-Time (2012) premiered at the National Theatre, directed by Marianne Elliott, adapted from the Mark Haddon novel of the same name
- A Doll's House (2012) premiered at the Young Vic, directed by Carrie Cracknell American premiere at Brooklyn Academy of Music (2014)
- Three Kingdoms (2011) premiered at Theatre NO99 in Tallinn, Estonia, directed by Sebastian Nübling, English premiere at the Lyric Hammersmith (2012) | German premiere at the Munich Kammerspiele (2011)
- I Am the Wind (2011) translation of the Jon Fosse play premiered at the Young Vic, directed by Patrice Chéreau
- Wastwater (2011) premiered at the Royal Court Theatre, directed by Katie Mitchell
- The Trial of Ubu (2010) premiered at the Toneelgroep in Amsterdam, (2012) English premiere at the Hampstead Theatre, directed by Katie Mitchell
- T5 (2010) premiered at DryWrite at the Roundhouse, directed by Vicky Jones, and further developed at the Traverse Theatre as part of Traverse Live!, directed by Dominic Hill
- A Thousand Stars Explode in the Sky (2010) written with David Eldridge and Robert Holman premiered at the Lyric Hammersmith, directed by Sean Holmes
- Marine Parade (2010) with music by Mark Eitzel premiered at the Brighton Festival directed by Jo McInnes
- Punk Rock (2009) premiered at the Royal Exchange Theatre, directed by Sarah Frankcom
- Canopy of Stars (2008) premiered at the Tricycle Theatre as part of the 'Great Game' series
- Sea Wall (2008) premiered in the Broken Space Season at Bush Theatre, directed by George Perrin
- Pornography (2007) premiered at the Traverse Theatre directed by Sean Holmes
- Harper Regan (2007) premiered at the National Theatre, directed by Marianne Elliott
- Motortown (2006) premiered at the Royal Court Theatre, directed by Ramin Gray
- On the Shore of the Wide World (2005) premiered at the Royal Exchange Theatre, directed by Sarah Frankcom
- Country Music (2004) premiered at the Royal Court Theatre, directed by Gordon Anderson
- Christmas (2004) premiered at the Bush Theatre, directed by Joanne McInnes
- One Minute (2003) premiered at the ATC, directed by Gordon Anderson
- Port (2002) premiered at the Royal Exchange, directed by Marianne Elliott
- Herons (2001) premiered at the Royal Court Theatre, directed by Simon Usher
- Bluebird (1998) premiered at the Royal Court Theatre, directed by Gordon Anderson
- Bring Me Sunshine (1997) premiered at the Edinburgh Fringe Festival, directed by Heather Davies

== Awards ==
- The Curious Incident of the Dog in the Night-Time won the 2013 Laurence Olivier Award for Best New Play and the 2015 Tony Award for Best Play
- Punk Rock was nominated at the TMA Awards for Best New Play in 2010, and was also nominated for the Evening Standard Award for Best New Play in 2010
- Pornography won the Critics' Awards for Theatre in Scotland for Best New Play in 2008-09
- On the Shore of The Wide World won the 2006 Laurence Olivier Award for Best New Play
- One Minute won at the Tron Theatre Awards as Best New Play in 2003
- Port won the Pearson Award for Best New Play in 2001

== See also ==
- List of British playwrights since 1950
- List of Irish dramatists
