= Ursula Curtiss =

American mystery novelist (1923–1984)

- Ursula Curtiss, from a 1948 publication.
- Born: Ursula Kieran Reilly; April 8, 1923; Yonkers, New York
- Died: October 10, 1984 (aged 61); Albuquerque, New Mexico
- Occupation: Writer
- Parent: Helen Reilly
- Relatives: Mary McMullen (sister); James Michael Kieran (grandfather); John Kieran (uncle)
- Awards: Red Badge Mystery Prize (1948); Zia Award (1963)

Ursula Kieran Reilly Curtiss (April 8, 1923 — October 10, 1984) was an American writer of mystery novels.

== Early life ==
Ursula Kieran Reilly was born in Yonkers, New York, and raised in Westport, Connecticut, the daughter of Paul Reilly and Helen Kieran Reilly. Her mother was a mystery writer, as was her sister, Mary McMullen. Ursula Reilly's grandfather was James Michael Kieran, one-time president of Hunter College. Her uncle was journalist John Kieran. Ursula Reilly graduated from a Catholic girls' high school, Lauralton Hall in Milford, Connecticut.

== Career ==
Books by Ursula Curtiss include Voice Out of Darkness (1948), The Second Sickle (1951), The Iron Cobweb (1953), The Noonday Devil (1953), The Deadly Climate (1954), Widow's Web (1956), The Face of the Tiger (1958), So Dies the Dreamer (1960), The Stairway (1961), The Forbidden Garden (1962) Hours to Kill (1962), The Wasp (1963), Child's Play (1964), Danger: Hospital Zone (1967), Don't Open the Door! (1969), Letter of Intent (1971), Dig a Little Deeper (1976), In Cold Pursuit (1977), The Menace Within (1978), Poisoned Orchard (1980), Graveyard Shift (1982), and Death of a Crow (1983). She also wrote short fiction, and several of her novels appeared in serial format in magazines such as Good Housekeeping and The Australian Women's Weekly.

Three films have been made based on Curtiss's stories, I Saw What You Did (1965), its 1988 made-for television remake, and What Ever Happened to Aunt Alice? (1969). She was also credited for stories on several television episodes in the 1950s and 1960s.

Curtiss won the Red Badge Mystery Prize in 1948, for best new mystery, and in 1963, she won the Zia Award as an outstanding New Mexico novelist. In 1956, The Spectator called her Widow's Web a "little masterpiece of suspense and ambiguity...quietly, pursuasively done, combining realism with ingenuity to a degree as rare on the author's side of the Atlantic as on ours."

== Personal life ==
Ursula Reilly married John Curtiss Jr. in 1947; her husband survived the Bataan Death March. She wrote while raising their five children in Massachusetts, and after 1960 in New Mexico. Ursula Curtiss died from cancer in Albuquerque, New Mexico, in 1984, aged 61 years.
