= Karl T. Hirsch =

American director and producer (born 1970)

- Born: October 17, 1970 (age 55); Phoenix, Arizona
- Occupations: Director, producer

Karl T. Hirsch (born October 17, 1970, in Phoenix, Arizona) is an American film director and producer. He retired from filmmaking in 2015.

== Awards ==
- Audience Favourite at the Victoria Independent Film & Video Festival (1998, won for Green)
- Breakthrough Award at the Newport Beach Film Festival (1998, won for Green)
- Best in the 'Film is a Four Letter Word' Series at the Valleyfest Film Festival (1999, won for Green)
- Best Arizona Filmmaker at the Phoenix Film Festival (2001, won for Green and Karl's in a Coma)
- Festival Director's Award at Method Fest Independent Film Festival (2005, for Clown)

== Filmography ==
=== Films ===
- Green (1998)
- Killer Bud (2001)
- Scarecrow (2002)
- Starkweather (2004)
- The Third Wish (2005)
- Officer Down (2005)
- Comedy Hell (2006)
- Aces (2006)
- Fist of the Warrior (2007)
- Frame of Mind (2009)
- Jill and Jac (2010)
- Making Change (2012)
- For the Love of Money (2012)
- Kill 'em All (2012)
- Abraham Lincoln vs. Zombies (2012, as writer)
- 88 (2015)

=== Shorts ===
- Karl's in a Coma (2000)
- Media Whore (2002)
- Clown (2005)
- Club Soda (2006)
- Remedy (2009)
- I Saw a Movie (2009)
- Fix Me: The Workout (2012)
- Fix Me: The Nanny (2012)
- Fix Me: The Trainer (2012)
- Dispossessed (2012)
