= Robin Witt =

American theatre director

Robin Witt is an American theater director. She is an ensemble member at both the Griffin Theatre and Steep Theatre Company in Chicago. Witt's notable productions include Enda Walsh's The New Electric Ballroom at A Red Orchid Theatre, Dennis Kelly's Love and Money, Simon Stephens' Wastwater, Motortown, Pornography, and Harper Regan at Steep Theatre, as well as Ena Lamont Stewart's Men Should Weep (2014-15 Jeff Award: Director, Production), Terence Rattigan's Flare Path (2013 Jeff Nominations, Director and Production) and Edna Ferber and George Kaufman's Stage Door (2011 Jeff Nominations, Director and Production) with the Griffin Theatre.

A graduate of NYU's Tisch School of the Arts (BFA) and Northwestern University (MFA), Witt is currently an Associate Professor of Directing at the University of North Carolina Charlotte.

Witt is the daughter of American television and theater actor Howard Witt and the great-niece of Sarah Schectman Zelzer, author of "Impresario: The Zelzer Era, 1930-1990." She is from Chicago, Illinois.
