= Tammy Lauren =

American actress

- Born: November 16, 1968 (age 57)
- Occupation: Actress
- Years active: 1978–2014
- Known for: Angie; Homefront; The Young and the Restless; Wishmaster
- Spouse: Guri Weinberg (m. 1997)

Tammy Lauren is an American film and television actress. She starred in the 1997 horror film Wishmaster.

== Career ==
As a child actress, Lauren's acting debut was in the role of Melissa Turner on the one-season television series Who's Watching the Kids?, in which she co-starred with Scott Baio, followed by stints on the short-lived sitcoms Out of the Blue and Angie. Lauren's guest appearances included television series such as Mork & Mindy, Fantasy Island, The Facts of Life, Family Ties and Little House on the Prairie.

Lauren co-starred with Elliott Gould and a young Rick Schroder in Disney's The Last Flight of Noah's Ark. She had a recurring role on the CBS daytime drama The Young and the Restless, where she portrayed Maggie Sullivan and also co-starred in many other television productions, including the movies Tattle: When To Tell On a Friend, Crime of Innocence and the 1988 remake I Saw What You Did. (The latter two paired her with Shawnee Smith.)

Among television fans, Lauren may be best known from the 1990s for her role as Ginger Szabo on Homefront, a series set in post-World War II Ohio. Lauren has also enjoyed recurring roles on Home Improvement, Wanda at Large (as Wanda's sister in-law) and The Drew Carey Show (as Drew's southern belle girlfriend Lily). She appeared in the first five episodes of Martial Law with Sammo Hung. She also appeared in two episodes of Walker, Texas Ranger ("99th Ranger" and "A Father's Image") and in an episode of MacGyver ("Nightmares"). She appears in Mad City (1997) with Dustin Hoffman and John Travolta, among several other theatrical releases. Wishmaster (1997) is the only feature film in which Lauren has played a starring role. She appeared on Two and a Half Men as Shannon in the episode "Aunt Myra Doesn't Pee a Lot" (2007). In 2014, she appeared on Criminal Minds as Liz Foley.

== Filmography ==
=== Film ===
Year	Title	Role	Notes
1980	The Last Flight of Noah's Ark	Julie	
1987	Bride of Boogedy	Jennifer Davis	
1988	Tiger Warsaw	Flashy Lady	
1991	Chains of Gold	Rachel Burke	
1994	Radioland Murders	In The Mood Bandleader	
1997	Wishmaster	Alexandra Amberson	
1997	Mad City	Miss Rose	
1997	Honeymoon	Debra	

=== Television ===
Year	Title	Role	Notes
1978	Fantasy Island	Tracy	Episode: "Vampire/The Lady and the Longhorn"
1978-1979	Who's Watching the Kids?	Melissa Turner	11 episodes
1979	Mork & Mindy	Holly	Episode: "Young Love"
1979	Angie	Hillary	12 episodes
1979	Out of the Blue	Stacey Richards	12 episodes
1980	Quincy, M.E.	"Pele" Royce	Episode: "Deadly Arena"
1980	Here's Boomer	Jenny	Episode: "Boomer and Miss 21st Century"
1980	CHiPs	Cheryl Marshall	Episode: "The Great 5K Star Race and Boulder Wrap Party"
1981	Nuts and Bolts	Lucy Fenton	Television film
1982	The Facts of Life	Kristy	Episode: "Runaway" (1982)
1982	The Kid with the Broken Halo	Diana McNulty	Television film
1982	Little House on the Prairie	Elizabeth Stark	Episode: "Rage"
1983	CHiPs	Becky Lou	Episode: "Brat Patrol"
1983	M.A.D.D.: Mothers Against Drunk Drivers	Chandler Doherty	Television film
1984	Things Are Looking Up	Giselle Kraft	Television film
1984	E/R	Sheila Dixon	Episode: "Pilot (Part 1)"
1985	Playing with Fire	Pamela Fredericks	Television film
1985	The Best Times	Giselle Kraft	6 episodes
1985	Crime of Innocence	Rene Peterson	Television film
1986	MacGyver	Lisa Allen	Episode: "Nightmares"
1986	Morningstar/Eveningstar	Lisa Thurston	7 episodes
1986	Fresno	Candy Cane	Television miniseries
1987	The Stepford Children	Mary Harding	Television film
1987	Outlaws	Unknown	Episode: "Independents"
1987	Walt Disney's Wonderful World of Color	Jennifer Davis	Episode: "Bride of Boogedy"
1987	CBS Schoolbreak Special	Karen Webb	Episode: "An Enemy Among Us"
1987	Family Ties	Marilyn Keaton	Episode: "Father Time"
1988	I Saw What You Did	Lisa Harris	Television film
1988	The Bronx Zoo	Linda	Episode: "Crossroads"
1988	The People Across the Lake	Lisa Yoman	Television film
1988	ABC Afterschool Specials	Colleen McNeil	Episode: "Tattle: When to Tell on a Friend"
1989	Desperate for Love	Lily Becker	Television film
1989	Valerie's Family: The Hogans	Lisa	Episode: "Private Lessons"
1989	The Hitchhiker	Ashlyn	Episode: "Dark Wishes"
1991	CBS Schoolbreak Special	Lizzie Stern	Episode: "The Emancipation of Lizzie Stern"
1991-1993	Homefront	Ginger Szabo	41 episodes
1993	CBS Schoolbreak Special	Jackie Rosen	Episode: "If I Die Before I Wake"
1994	Matlock	Pat Preston	Episode: "The Crook" (uncredited)
1994	Sisters	Evelyn Barrington	2 episodes
1994	Diagnosis: Murder	Leah Foxworth	Episode: "Broadcast Blues"
1994	Grace Under Fire	Tracy Lynde	Episode: "Good Ol' Grace"
1994-1995	Dave's World	Julie	4 episodes
1996	Mr. & Mrs. Smith	Meg Andrews	Episode: "The Publishing Episode" (1996)
1997	Walker, Texas Ranger	Bobbie Hunt	2 episodes
1997	The Visitor	Charlotte MacArthur	2 episodes
1997-1999	Home Improvement	Patty	7 episodes
1998	Martial Law	Detective Dana Dixon	5 episodes
2002	That's Life	Kristi Dutton	Episode: "All About Lydia"
2003	The Drew Carey Show	Lily	4 episodes
2003	Wanda at Large	Jenny Hawkins	5 episodes
2005	Crossing Jordan	Faye Vaughn	Episode: "You Really Got Me"
2006-2008	The Young and the Restless	Detective Maggie Sullivan	107 episodes
2007	The Game	Jordan	Episode: "To Baby... Or Not to Baby"
2007	Two and a Half Men	Shannon	Episode: "Aunt Myra Doesn't Pee a Lot"
2010	Madison Avery	Madison Avery	Episode: "Pilot"
2014	Criminal Minds	Liz Foley	Episode: "Rabid"

== Awards and nominations ==
Year	Award	Work	Category	Result	Reference
1988	Young Artist Award	CBS Schoolbreak Special: "An Enemy Among Us"	Best Young Actress Starring in a Television Drama Special, Movie of the Week or Variety Show	Nominated	
