= 1987 in American television =

In 1987, television in the United States saw a number of significant events, including the debuts, finales, and cancellations of television shows; the launch, closure, and rebranding of channels; changes and additions to network affiliations by stations; controversies, business transactions, and carriage disputes; and the deaths of individuals who had made notable contributions to the medium.

== Events ==
Date	Event
January 3	After being canceled by CBS at the end of the 1984–85 season, Charles in Charge resurfaces in first-run syndication, where it would run for an additional four seasons.
January 5	Remington Steele is resumed by NBC after a six-month hiatus. During the hiatus, the series' main actor Pierce Brosnan won the film role of James Bond, only to lose the role when NBC unexpectedly renewed the television series. Remington Steele adopts a TV-movie length format but only runs for a few installments before being canceled permanently.
January 17	NBC announces purchase of CBS affiliate WTVJ, and stripped off WSVN, thus the switch did not take effect until two years later.
January 22	R. Budd Dwyer shoots and kills himself at a televised press conference. The decision by some companies to broadcast the footage results in a debate concerning journalistic ethics.
January 23	After being dropped by CBS following its third season, Airwolf is resurfaces on the USA Network, who funded the fourth season, to be produced in Canada by Atlantis and The Arthur Company (owned by Arthur L. Annecharico) in association with MCA. This was intended to increase the number of episodes to make the show eligible for broadcast syndication. The principal cast is deemed too expensive to hire, so an entirely new cast is created. Jan-Michael Vincent (Stringfellow Hawke) however, appears in the first transitional episode. This particular iteration of Airwolf would last for a single, 24 episode long season, concluding on August 7, 1987.
January 25	CBS' broadcast of Super Bowl XXI becomes the first NFL game to be broadcast in Dolby Surround sound and in stereo. CBS also debuted the theme music (composed by Lloyd Landesman) that would later be used for their college football coverage during this game, as well as its open that was used through 1990.
February 2	PBS broadcasts the critically acclaimed series Eyes on the Prize.
February 7	In the very special episode of Valerie titled "Bad Timing", David and a former girlfriend debate whether to have sex. The episode featured the first use of the word condom on a prime time television program. Parental advisory warnings were issued in ads for the episode and NBC placed an advisory warning before the episode aired stating that parents may want to watch the episode with their children. Because of the episode's subject matter, some of NBC's affiliates either aired the show outside of prime time or refused to air it at all. The episode was later released to home video, especially for teachers and health educators to use as a tool to promote safe sex.
February 14	Pee-wee Herman guest stars on the NBC sitcom 227.
February 15	Amerika, the science-fiction drama miniseries, showing life ten years after the United States is defeated and occupied by the USSR, was broadcast on ABC.
February 20	David Hartman anchors ABC's Good Morning America for the final time. He would be succeeded by Charles Gibson, who would anchor the program alongside Joan Lunden.
February 24	James Coco makes his final recurring appearance as Tony Micelli's father–in–law, Nick Milano on the ABC sitcom Who's the Boss? Just one day later, Coco would die of a heart attack at the age of 56. The Season 4 episode "A Farewell to Nick" would later be produced in Coco's honor.
February 25	On CBS, Frank Sinatra makes a guest appearance on Magnum P.I., in what would be his last credited screen performance.
March 9	KETK-TV in Jacksonville, Texas signs on the air, giving the Tyler market its first full-time NBC affiliate. (NBC had previously been shared on KLTV with CBS (until KLMG-TV signed on in 1984), and later ABC which KLTV retains as a full-time affiliate.)
March 12	"A, My Name is Alex", a special hour-long episode of Family Ties is broadcast on NBC. The second half-hour was broadcast without commercials. The episode would win numerous awards, including a Primetime Emmy Award, a Humanitas Prize and a Writers Guild of America Award for writing as well as a DGA Award.
March 19	Televangelist Jim Bakker resigns as the host of The PTL Club after involvement in a sex scandal.
March 23	The first ever Soul Train Music Awards is broadcast in syndication.
March 23	The soap opera The Bold and the Beautiful debuts on CBS.
March 27	On CBS, The Price Is Right surpasses Concentration as the longest-running daytime game show in history.
March 28	The forerunner to the Kids' Choice Awards, dubbed 'The Big Ballot', airs on Nickelodeon. The Big Ballot was actually aired over four consecutive weeks (with the movie winners, TV winners, music winners, and finally sports winners being announced for each week) as part of the movie review program Rated K: For Kids by Kids.
March 29	In front of 93,173 fans Hulk Hogan retains the WWF World Heavyweight Championship at WrestleMania 3 at the Pontiac Silverdome in Pontiac, Michigan defeating his former friend André The Giant.
March 30	CBS Sports uses the song "One Shining Moment" for the first time during the highlight package at the end of their coverage of NCAA men's basketball tournament final.
March 31	On ABC's Moonlighting, Maddie and David consummate their relationship after two and a half years of romantic tension.
April 5	The Fox TV network makes its prime-time debut, marking the first time since 1955 that there were four U.S. networks with prime-time programming. The network debuted two shows, Married... with Children and The Tracey Ullman Show, which are broadcast three times each during the night so that viewers watching other networks can switch over and sample the shows.
April 6	During an episode of the ABC late-night news program Nightline devoted to the upcoming 40th anniversary of Jackie Robinson's debut in Major League Baseball, Los Angeles Dodgers general manager Al Campanis makes racially insensitive comments when asked about the scarcity of black field or general managers in MLB. Campanis would be fired two days later.
April 17	Bill Murray announces a Chicago Cubs-Montreal Expos game at Wrigley Field on WGN. Working alongside Steve Stone, Murray was filling in while broadcaster Harry Caray was recovering from a stroke. Caray would eventually return to the booth on May 19.
April 19	Matt Groening's The Simpsons debuts as a series of short animated segments as part of The Tracey Ullman Show on Fox.
April 29	Independent station in New York City, WOR-TV changes its call sign to WWOR-TV.
May 4	Valerie Harper makes her final appearance as Valerie Hogan on what was initially called Valerie. After Harper was fired from the series following contractual disputes, the NBC series was renamed Valerie's Family and finally, The Hogan Family come the fourth season.
May 6	Mr. Belvedere is canceled after three seasons; however criticism causes ABC executives to rethink the decision and renew the series for a fourth season. (Since the fall programming schedules were already set, Mr. Belvedere would not premiere until late October.)
May 7	Shelley Long makes her final regular appearance as Diane Chambers on the NBC sitcom Cheers. She would appear once more in the series finale in 1993.
May 15	Pamela Ewing's car speeds out of control, crashes into a tanker, and explodes on the season finale of the CBS drama Dallas.
May 15	Joan Rivers makes her final appearance as host of Fox's talk show The Late Show following her recent firing by the network. For the final show, the set is vandalized with toilet paper, slime, and shaving cream. Her guests are Howie Mandel, Pee-Wee Herman, then-fledgling comedian Chris Rock, Wendy O. Williams, and show stage manager Michelle Aller as her alter-ego Mavis Vegas Davis. Soon afterward, the program is renamed The Late Show and features rotating guest hosts including Suzanne Somers, Richard Belzer, and Robert Townsend. After firing prospective guest host Frank Zappa, producer John Scura replaces him with Arsenio Hall, who would make his debut as a talk show host. Eventually, Hall is named the permanent replacement host in mid-1987.
May 17	The Return of the Six Million Dollar Man and the Bionic Woman, which features Lee Majors and Lindsay Wagner reprising their roles as Steve Austin and Jaime Sommers respectively, airs on NBC. This would be followed by two more television movies, Bionic Showdown: The Six Million Dollar Man and the Bionic Woman (1989) and Bionic Ever After? (1994).
June 4	CBS becomes the last American network to cease a chime intonation at the beginning of telecasts; satellite feeds have made the tones obsolete (their function was to signal to the affiliates to start broadcasting the network feed in synchronization with the others).
June 30	U.S. daytime television was interrupted for the Iran-Contra hearings.
July 15	Genie Francis, of General Hospital fame, starts a new soap opera role as Diana Colville on the NBC soap opera Days of Our Lives, which she will play until 1989.
July 17	The initial pilot for Good Morning, Miss Bliss airs on NBC. One year later, the series proper would air on the Disney Channel, becoming the first program to be produced by a major television network for cable TV. After one season on Disney Channel, Good Morning, Miss Bliss would be retooled into Saved by the Bell, which would air as part of NBC's Saturday morning line-up.
July 28	Actor Crispin Glover appears on NBC's Late Night with David Letterman to promote River's Edge. To the surprise of Letterman and the audience, Glover appears wearing platform shoes and a wig. During the interview, Glover behaves erratically and nearly kicks Letterman in the face, causing Letterman to walk off the set. Four years later, the film Rubin & Ed premiered, in which Glover has a starring role as titular character Rubin Farr. After the release of Rubin & Ed, some speculated that Glover was acting in-character as Rubin Farr during his appearance on Late Night.
July 31	Movietime, forerunner to E!, goes on the air.
August 1	ABC affiliate KRCR-TV in Redding, California launches full-time satellite KAEF-TV in Arcata, California, giving the Eureka market its first full-time ABC affiliate.
August 19	During the 4 p.m. edition of KNBC's Channel 4 News, a gun-wielding man named Gary Stollman gets into NBC's Burbank Studios as a guest of an employee and takes consumer reporter David Horowitz hostage live on the air. With the gun pressed on his side, Horowitz calmly reads the gunman's statements on camera but unbeknownst to the gunman, the news feed has been taken off the air. The unidentified man reveals at the end of his statement that the gun is an empty BB gun and sets the gun down on the news desk, at which point anchorman John Beard quickly confiscates it. The incident leads Horowitz to start a campaign to ban realistic toy guns.
August 29	SIN broadcasts the final of the 10th National OTI-SIN Festival live from Miami.
August 31	CBS airs the special Michael Jackson: The Magic Returns, which features the broadcast premiere of Jackson's 18 minute long music video "Bad".
August 31	Columbus independent station WWAT-TV goes in the air.
September 5	Dick Clark's American Bandstand is broadcast for the 2,751st and last time by ABC, after 30 years on the network. (It continued in syndication, then on cable for 2 more years.)
September 7	The original series of Disney's well known animated series DuckTales begins airing on ITV in the UK.
September 7	CBS begins broadcasting its prime time programs with stereo sound dubbed CBS StereoSound.
September 11	Dan Rather of the CBS Evening News leaves the newscast when a televised tennis match runs two minutes over. He is missing for six minutes.
September 12	The final episode of Down and Out in Beverly Hills, an adaptation of the 1986 film of the same name, airs on Fox. It has the distinction of being the first ever show to be cancelled by Fox; 5 of the 13 produced episodes did not air.
September 14	Filmation's final animated series BraveStarr has its broadcast premiere in syndication.
September 18	DuckTales finally begins airing in the U.S. for the first time ever in syndication.
September 19	NBC debuts a weekday package of sitcoms for its owned-and-operated stations called "Prime Time Begins at 7:30". The shows included are Marblehead Manor (airing Mondays), She's the Sheriff (airing Tuesdays), a series adapted from the George S. Kaufman play You Can't Take It with You (airing Wednesdays), Out of This World (airing Thursdays), and a revival of the short-lived 1983 NBC series We Got It Made closing out the week on Fridays.
September 21	Following its cancellation by ABC after four seasons, the sitcom Webster is relaunched in first-run syndication, where it would run for two additional seasons.
September 22	Long-running sitcom Full House created by Jeff Franklin debuts on ABC.
September 24	Kirstie Alley makes her debut as Rebecca Howe in the sixth-season premiere of Cheers on NBC.
September 26	The pilot episode for the sitcom Second Chance airs on Fox. In the opening scene, as a throwaway joke, Colonel Muammar Gaddafi is shown being judged after his death, with the date given as July 29, 2011. In the year after the Berlin discotheque bombing and the U.S. response, the 1987 pilot was playing off Gaddafi's prominent negative perception by the American public. Twenty-four years later, by coincidence, Gaddafi's death (on October 20, 2011) occurred within three months of the "predicted" date and was from the same cause (multiple gunshot wounds).
September 28	The pilot episode for Star Trek: The Next Generation premieres in syndication.
October 3	Once a Hero, the show's lowest rated program of the season holds its last aired episode on ABC. The following week, specials replaced it until the debut of Sable in its time period on November 7.
October 4	On the final day of the Major League Baseball season, the Detroit Tigers clinch the American League East title against their divisional rivals the Toronto Blue Jays. The game was broadcast on Sunday afternoon on ABC with Al Michaels, Jim Palmer and Tim McCarver on the call.
October 12	Valerie Harper files a lawsuit against NBC and Lorimar for breach of contract after being dismissed from her sitcom Valerie.
October 14	CNN quickly reports on the story of 18-month-old toddler Jessica McClure falling down a well in Midland, Texas, and the event helped make its name.
October 15	Bob Barker stops dyeing his hair brown and appears on the CBS game show The Price is Right for the first time with white hair. He is given a minute-long standing ovation by the audience.
October 16	Max Headroom makes its final airing on its Friday night timeslot on ABC. The previously unaired episodes will later burn off in its Thursday night time slot during the 1988 WGA strike on ABC, replacing Probe. The fourth season opener of Mr. Belvedere and the premiere of Pursuit of Happiness will replace Headroom two weeks later, on October 30 on its Friday night time period.
October 24	ABC allows Game 6 of the World Series between the Minnesota Twins and St. Louis Cardinals to be played at 3 p.m. CT (4 p.m. ET) on Saturday afternoon – the only day game of the series, and the last World Series game to date to be played in the daytime (although as the game was played in the Metrodome, the game took place under artificial illumination all the same).
October 26	ABC airs a special, secondary edition of Monday Night Football for the Minneapolis and Denver markets. The game between the Vikings and Broncos was moved from Sunday, October 25 to the following Monday night because the Hubert H. Humphrey Metrodome was being used for Game 7 of the World Series. Gary Bender and Lynn Swann would call this special contest from Minnesota while the rest of the nation sees the Los Angeles Rams face off against the Cleveland Browns.
October 30	The third season of Punky Brewster begins after the series was off the air for over a year and a half. After NBC cancelled it at the end of the 1985–86 season, the show would continue production throughout the 1986–87 season leading up to its return to the air via first-run syndication.
November 8	ESPN broadcasts its first ever Sunday night National Football League game, a contest between the New York Giants and New England Patriots. It marked the first time that a cable television outlet broadcast an NFL game.
November 9	Fox's Salt Lake City affiliate KSTU moves its channel allocation from UHF channel 20 to VHF channel 13.
November 13	Sonny & Cher reunite for a performance on NBC's late-night talk show Late Night with David Letterman.
November 15	The animated crossover The Jetsons Meet the Flintstones premieres in syndication.
November 22	During a showing of the Doctor Who story "Horror of Fang Rock", PBS member station WTTW-TV Channel 11 in Chicago is interrupted for 88 seconds by a pirate television transmitter overriding the station's transmission signal to broadcast a video of himself in a Max Headroom mask being spanked. The similar incident (for 15–20 seconds) occurred during WGN-TV's newscast when it showed the mask moving up and downwards.
November 22	Star Wars: Episode V – The Empire Strikes Back makes its network broadcast television premiere on NBC.
November 26	The very first Survivor Series professional wrestling event is broadcast on pay-per-view. That same night, the World Wrestling Federation's competitor, Jim Crockett Promotions held their fifth annual Starrcade supercard event. Jim Crockett Promotions had previously aired Starrcade only on closed-circuit television. To compete with Starrcade, the WWF introduced the Survivor Series event, and held it on the same night as Starrcade. The WWF also limited the amount of pay-per-view providers that would carry Starrcade by not allowing providers to carry WrestleMania IV if they did not carry Survivor Series exclusively. Only a small amount of providers carried Starrcade, and it drew a 3.30 buy rate while Survivor Series drew a 7.0 buy rate.
December 7	Remote Control, MTV's first original non-musical program and first game show makes its debut.
December 16	San Antonio television station KABB goes on the air.
December 16	SuperStation WTBS airs the 1983 film A Christmas Story for the very first time. Turner Broadcasting (as both an independent company and, from 1996 onward, as a subsidiary of the company presently operating as Warner Bros. Discovery) would maintain ownership of the broadcast rights to A Christmas Story. Beginning in the mid-1990s, they would air the film increasingly on both TBS and TNT throughout the holiday season annually.
December 27	Through a short stint with NBC Sports, Gayle Sierens became the first woman to do play-by-play for an NFL regular season football game when she called a game between the Seattle Seahawks and the Kansas City Chiefs.
December 28	The first ever Teenage Mutant Ninja Turtles cartoon series premieres in syndication starting off with the first four episodes.

== Programs ==
=== Debuting this year ===
Date	Title	Network
January 3	Unsolved Mysteries	NBC
January 8	Shell Game	CBS
January 17	Ohara	ABC
January 22	The Tortellis	NBC
January 25	Hard Copy	CBS
January 26	Square One TV	PBS
February 2	Eyes on the Prize	PBS
March 4	Harry	ABC
March 9	Rags to Riches	NBC
March 11	Houston Knights	CBS
March 19	The Bronx Zoo	NBC
March 19	Roomies	NBC
March 20	The Charmings	ABC
March 23	The Bold and the Beautiful	CBS
March 23	The Popcorn Kid	CBS
March 31	Max Headroom	ABC
April 1	Mariah	ABC
April 1	Roxie	CBS
April 1	Take Five	CBS
April 2	Nothing in Common	NBC
April 5	Married... with Children	Fox
April 5	The Tracey Ullman Show	Fox
April 12	21 Jump Street	Fox
April 18	Sweet Surrender	NBC
April 19	Bionic Six	Syndication
April 19	Duet	Fox
April 20	Hard Knocks	Showtime
April 26	Down and Out in Beverly Hills	Fox
May 3	Mr. President	Fox
May 21	The Days and Nights of Molly Dodd	NBC
June 1	Adventures of the Little Koala	Nickelodeon
June 12	CBS Summer Playhouse	CBS
June 15	Home Shopping Game	Syndication
July 11	Good Morning, Miss Bliss	Disney Channel
July 11	Werewolf	Fox
July 18	Karen's Song	Fox
July 18	The New Adventures of Beans Baxter	Fox
August 8	Animal Crack-Ups	ABC
August 27	First Impressions	CBS
August 30	Crossbow	CBN Cable Network
September	Maple Town	Syndication
September 12	Showtime at the Apollo	ABC
September 12	I'm Telling!	NBC
September 12	The New Archies	NBC
September 12	Popeye and Son	CBS
September 13	Private Eye	NBC
September 14	Dinosaucers	Syndication
September 14	BraveStarr	Syndication
September 14	Maxie's World	Syndication
September 14	New Monkees	Syndication
September 14	The Wil Shriner Show	Syndication
September 14	Frank's Place	CBS
September 16	The Oldest Rookie	CBS
September 16	Wiseguy	CBS
September 17	Out of This World	Syndication
September 18	DuckTales (Original series)	Syndication
September 19	The Kidsongs TV Show	Syndication
September 19	Marblehead Manor	Syndication
September 19	She's the Sheriff	Syndication
September 19	Once a Hero	ABC
September 19	Hello Kitty's Furry Tale Theater	CBS
September 20	The Highwayman	NBC
September 20	My Two Dads	NBC
September 20	Visionaries: Knights of the Magical Light	Syndication
September 21	Beverly Hills Teens	Syndication
September 21	Spiral Zone	Syndication
September 22	Full House	ABC
September 22	I Married Dora	ABC
September 23	Hooperman	ABC
September 23	The Slap Maxwell Story	ABC
September 24	A Different World	NBC
September 24	Tour of Duty	CBS
September 25	Beauty and the Beast	CBS
September 26	Jake and the Fatman	CBS
September 26	ALF: The Animated Series	NBC
September 26	J.J. Starbuck	NBC
September 26	Second Chance (aka Boys Will Be Boys)	Fox
September 26	You Can't Take It With You	Syndication
September 27	Dolly	ABC
September 27	The Law & Harry McGraw	CBS
September 28	Lingo	Syndication
September 28	Star Trek: The Next Generation	Syndication
September 29	thirtysomething	ABC
October 3	Everything's Relative	CBS
October 3	Leg Work	CBS
October 3	Friday the 13th: The Series	Syndication
October 11	Women in Prison	Fox
November 2	Finders Keepers	Nickelodeon
November 5	Beverly Hills Buntz	NBC
November 7	Sable	ABC
November 30	CBS This Morning	CBS
December 7	Remote Control	MTV
December 11	The Wilton North Report	Fox
December 14	Teenage Mutant Ninja Turtles	Syndication

=== Resuming this year ===
Title	Final aired	Previous network	New title	Returning network	Date of return
Charles in Charge	1985	CBS	Same	Syndication	January 3
Blockbusters	1982	NBC	Same	Same	January 5
Concentration	1978	Syndication	Classic Concentration	NBC	May 4
We Got it Made	1984	NBC	Same	Syndication	September 11
Snorks	1985	NBC	Same	Same	September 12
High Rollers	1980	NBC	Same	Syndication	September 14
Truth or Consequences	1978	Syndication	Same	Syndication	September 14
The Jetsons	1963	ABC	Same	Syndication	October 19

=== Ending this year ===
Date	Title	Debut
January 10	Heart of the City	1986
February 6	Dads	1986
February 9	Gung Ho	1986
February 7	Too Close for Comfort	1980
February 27	The Love Boat	1977
March 1	The New Adventures of Jonny Quest	1986
March 3	Silver Spoons	1982
March 7	The Berenstain Bears	1985
March 8	The A-Team	1983
March 12	The Wizard	1986
March 20	Capitol	1982
March 25	Harry	1987
March 26	The Colbys	1985
March 27	Zoobilee Zoo	1986
March 30	You Again?	1986
March 30	Fraggle Rock	1983
April 8	Roxie	1987
April 10	Amazing Stories	1985
April 17	Remington Steele	1982
April 24	Together We Stand	1986
April 29	Easy Street	1986
May 1	Blockbusters	1980
May 2	Starman	1986
May 8	Stingray	1985
May 12	Gimme a Break!	1981
May 12	The Tortellis	1987
May 13	The New Mike Hammer	1984
May 15	Roomies	1987
May 18	Fame	1982
May 19	Hill Street Blues	1981
May 28	Scarecrow and Mrs. King	1983
May 28	Our World	1986
May 30	Outlaws	1986
June 3	Nothing in Common	1987
June 13	Sidekicks	1986
June 19	Nightlife	1986
June 27	Gung Ho	1986
July 8	Sweet Surrender	1987
August 7	Airwolf	1984
September 7	The Ellen Burstyn Show	1986
September 11	Split Second	1972
September 12	Down and Out in Beverly Hills	1987
September 12	Karen's Song	1987
September 14	Photon	1986
September 23	My Little Pony	1984
October 1	First Impressions	1987
October 3	Once a Hero	1987
October 25	Maxie's World	1987
November 7	Everything's Relative	1987
November 7	Leg Work	1987
November 7	Teen Wolf	1986
November 11	The Transformers	1984
November 12	The Jetsons	1962
November 28	The New Adventures of Beans Baxter	1987
December 7	New Monkees	1987
December 11	Dinosaucers	1987
December 12	Popeye and Son	1987
December 12	The P.T.L. Club	1976
December 18	Beverly Hills Teens	1987
December 18	Spiral Zone	1987
December 19	My Pet Monster	1987
December 19	Pound Puppies	1986

=== Changing networks ===
Show	Moved from	Moved to
Airwolf	CBS	USA Network
Alfred Hitchcock Presents	NBC	USA Network
Candid Camera	NBC	CBS
We Got it Made	NBC	Syndication
High Rollers	NBC	Syndication
Punky Brewster	NBC	Syndication
Charles in Charge	CBS	Syndication
Webster	ABC	Syndication
American Bandstand	ABC	Syndication
Concentration	Syndication	NBC
Inspector Gadget	Syndication	Nickelodeon

=== Made-for-TV movies and miniseries ===
Title	Network	Premiere date	Notes
After the Promise	CBS	October 11	
Amerika	ABC	February 8	
Angel in Green	CBS	September 22	
Assault and Matrimony	NBC	September 28	
Bay Coven	NBC	October 25	
Billionaire Boys Club	NBC	November 8	Emmy Award nominee for Outstanding Miniseries
Bluffing It	ABC	September 13	
Norman Rockwell's Breaking Home Ties	ABC	November 26	Based on Norman Rockwell's painting
Christmas Comes to Willow Creek	CBS	December 20	
Conspiracy: The Trial of the Chicago 8	HBO	May 16	Based on the trial of the Chicago Eight
Conspiracy of Love	CBS	October 18	
Dangerous Affection	NBC	November 1	
Deep Dark Secrets	NBC	October 26	
Desperate	ABC	September 19	
Downpayment on Murder	NBC	December 6	
Echoes in the Darkness	CBS	November 1	
Eight Is Enough: A Family Reunion	NBC	October 18	Reunion film for TV series Eight Is Enough
Eye on the Sparrow	NBC	December 7	
The Facts of Life Down Under	CBS	October 25	
Family Sins	NBC	February 15	
Fatal Confession: A Father Dowling Mystery	NBC	November 30	
The Father Clements Story	NBC	December 13	
Foxfire	CBS	December 13	Emmy Award nominee for Outstanding Drama or Comedy Special
Kenny Rogers as The Gambler, Part III: The Legend Continues	CBS	November 22	
Gunsmoke: Return to Dodge	CBS	September 26	Based on the television series Gunsmoke
A Hobo's Christmas	CBS	December 6	
If It's Tuesday, It Still Must Be Belgium	NBC	September 21	Remake of If It's Tuesday, This Must Be Belgium (1969)
Kids Like These	CBS	November 8	
LBJ: The Early Years	NBC	February 1	Based on the early years of U.S. President Lyndon B. Johnson; Emmy Award nominee for Outstanding Drama or Comedy Special
Lena: My 100 Children	NBC	November 23	The story of Lena Küchler-Silberman
The Little Match Girl	NBC	December 21	Based on Hans Christian Andersen's 1845 fairy tale
The Long Journey Home	CBS	November 29	
Mayflower Madam	CBS	November 15	Based on Sydney Biddle Barrows' 1986 autobiography Mayflower Madam: The Secret Life of Sydney Biddle Barrows
Mistress	CBS	October 4	
Napoleon and Josephine: A Love Story	ABC	November 10	Three-part miniseries about Napoleon Bonaparte and Joséphine de Beauharnais
Not Quite Human	ABC	December 20	
Perry Mason: The Case of the Lost Love	NBC	February 23	
Perry Mason: The Case of the Murdered Madam	NBC	October 4	
Perry Mason: The Case of the Scandalous Scoundrel	NBC	November 15	
Perry Mason: The Case of the Sinister Spirit	NBC	May 24	
Plaza Suite	ABC	December 3	Based on the Neil Simon 1968 play
Poor Little Rich Girl: The Barbara Hutton Story	NBC	November 16	
Proud Men	ABC	October 1	
The Return of the Shaggy Dog	ABC	November 1	Sequel to The Shaggy Dog (1959)
Roman Holiday	NBC	December 28	Remake of the 1953 film
Sadie and Son	CBS	October 21	
The Secret Garden	CBS	November 30	Based on Frances Hodgson Burnett's 1911 novel
Strange Voices	NBC	October 19	
Student Exchange	ABC	November 29	
The Three Kings	ABC	December 17	

== Networks and services ==
=== Launches ===
Network	Type	Launch date	Notes	Source
The Travel Channel	Cable television	February 8		
Fox	Broadcast television	April 5	Previously had a "soft launch" on October 9, 1986	
Movietime	Cable television	July 31		
Harmony Premiere Network	Cable television	Unknown		

=== Conversions and rebrandings ===
Old network name	New network name	Type	Conversion Date	Notes	Source
NetSpan	Telemundo	Cable television	Unknown		
Spanish International Network (SIN)	Univision	Cable and satellite	September 1		
SuperStation WTBS	SuperStation TBS	Cable television	Unknown		

=== Closures ===
Network	Type	Closure date	Notes	Source
Home Theater Network	Cable television	January 31		
Operation Prime Time	Cable television	Unknown		

== Television stations ==
=== Station launches ===
Date	City of License/Market	Station	Channel	Affiliation	Notes/Ref.
January 11	Bartlesville/Tulsa, Oklahoma	KDOR-TV	17	TBN	
February	Hattiesburg/Laurel, Mississippi	WHLT	22	CBS	Semi-satellite of WJTV/Jackson
February 2	Marshalltown/Des Moines, Iowa	K39AS	39		
February 7	Orlando, Florida	WLSY	43	Independent	
February 9	Dallas/Fort Worth, Texas	KDTX-TV	58	TBN (O&O)	
February 13	Williamsport, Pennsylvania	W39BT	39	TBN	
February 14	Biloxi/Gulfport, Mississippi	WXXV-TV	25	Fox	
February 15	San Juan, Puerto Rico	WSJN-TV	24	Independent	
March 9	Charlotte, North Carolina	WJZY	46	Independent	
March 9	Tyler, Texas	KETK	56	NBC	
March 23	Toledo, Ohio	W48AP	48	Independent	
April	Redwood Falls, Minnesota	KRWF	43	ABC	Semi-satellite of KSTP-TV
April 7	Mobile, Alabama	WFGX	35	Independent	
April 18	Atlanta, Georgia	WNGM-TV	34	Independent	
May	Los Angeles, California	KDDE (recalled as KEEF-TV in June)	68	Educational independent	
May 6	Springfield, Massachusetts	W11BT	11	Independent	
May 13	Buffalo, New York	WNEQ-TV	23	PBS	
May 22	Terre Haute, Indiana	W65BK	65	TBN	
May 25	Cleveland/Chattanooga, Tennessee	WFLI-TV	53	Independent	
May 29	Sioux Falls, South Dakota	KTTW	7	Fox	
June 18	Cocoa/Orlando, Florida	WRES	68	Educational independent	
June 30	Kalamazoo/Battle Creek/Grand Rapids, Michigan	WLLA	64	Christian independent	
July 1	Clairemore/Tulsa, Oklahoma	KXON-TV	35	Educational independent	
July 2	Darien, Connecticut	W33BS	33	Audio-only independent	Pulse 87
July 4	Frederick, Maryland (Washington, D.C.)	WFPT	62	PBS	Part of the Maryland Public Television network
July 16	Houston, Texas	KETH	14	TBN (O&O)	
August 1	Arcata/Eureka, California	KREQ	23	Fox	
August 5	Baton Rouge, Louisiana	W49KG	49	Independent	
August 10	Rochester, Minnesota (Mason City, Iowa)	KXLT-TV	47	Independent	Originally a satellite of KXLI/Minneapolis
August 14	Merrimack/Manchester, New Hampshire	WGOT	60	Independent	
August 15	Barstow/Los Angeles, California	KVVT	64	Independent	
August 24	Columbus, Ohio	WOCB-CD (original callsign unknown)	39	Religious independent	
August 27	Bloomington, Indiana	WCLJ-TV	42	TBN	
August 28	Cheyenne, Wyoming	KKTU	39	NBC	
August 31	Columbus, Ohio	WWAT	53	Independent	
September	Buffalo, New York	WNYB-TV	49	Independent	
September	Silver City, New Mexico	KOVT	10	ABC	Satellite of KOAT-TV/Albuquerque
September 1	Bozeman/Butte, Montana	KCTZ	7	ABC	
September 2	Denver, Colorado	KUBD	59	Independent	
September 5	Albuquerque, New Mexico	KLUZ	41	Univision	
September 18	Rosenberg/Houston, Texas	KXLN	45	Univision	
September 21	New Orleans, Louisiana	K59DG	59	Daystar	
September 28	Bridgeport, Connecticut (New York City)	WBCT-TV	43	Independent	
October 12	Albuquerque, New Mexico	KAZQ	34	Religious independent	
October 18	Richland, Washington	KTNW	31	PBS	Satellite of KWSU-TV/Spokane
October 19	Tamuning, Guam	KTGM	14	ABC (primary); CBS (secondary)	
October 19	Indianapolis, Indiana	WMCC	23	Independent	
October 28	Chicago, Illinois	W54AP	54	Independent	
October 28	Chicago, Illinois	W54AP	54	Independent	
October 29	Tampa, Florida	W57BA	57	Channel America	
November 12	Stockton, California (Sacramento/Modesto, California)	KFTL	64	Independent	
November 15	Gary, Indiana (Chicago, Illinois)	WYIN	56	PBS	
December	Steamboat Springs, Colorado	KSBS-TV	24	Independent	
December 2	South Bend, Indiana	W12BK (original)	12	Independent	LPTV translator of WCIU-TV/Chicago
December 7	Galveston/Houston, Texas	KTMD	47	Telemundo	
December 8	Chicago, Illinois	W46AO	46	TBN	
December 8	Lenoir City/Knoxville, Tennessee	W38AQ	38	FamilyNet/America One	
December 14	Albany, New York	WOCD	55	Independent	
December 15	Elkhart/South Bend, Indiana	W24AI	24	TBN	
December 15	Hopkinsville, Kentucky (Clarksville, Tennessee)	W22CH	22	TBN	
December 16	San Antonio, Texas	KABB	29	Independent	
Unknown date	Charlotte Amalie, U.S. Virgin Islands	WAIG	43	Independent	
Unknown date	Charlotte Amalie, U.S. Virgin Islands	WVGI	17	Independent	
Unknown date	Christiansted, U.S. Virgin Islands	WMEG	15	Religious independent	
Unknown date	Panama City, Florida	W46AN	46	Tourist information	

=== Network affiliation changes ===
Date	City of License/Market	Station	Channel	Old affiliation	New affiliation	Notes/Ref.
January 19	Boston, Massachusetts	WFXT	25	Independent	Fox	
April 5	Davenport, Iowa (Quad Cities)	KLJB-TV	18	Independent	Fox	
April 5	Evansville, Indiana	WEVV-TV	44	Independent	Fox	
April 5	Memphis, Tennessee	WMKW-TV	30	Independent	Fox	
April 5	Nashville, Tennessee	WCAY-TV	30	Independent	Fox	
April 5	Tri-Cities, Tennessee/Virginia	WEMT	38	Independent	Fox	
July 6	Columbus, Georgia	WXTX	54	Independent	Fox	
July 6	Jackson, Mississippi	WDBD	40	Independent	Fox	
July 6	Knoxville, Tennessee	WKCH-TV	43	Independent	Fox	
September 7	Cape Girardeau, Missouri (Paducah, Kentucky/Harrisburg, Illinois)	KBSI	23	Independent	Fox	
October 19	Hagatna, Guam	KUAM-TV	8	NBC (primary); CBS/ABC/Fox (secondary)	NBC (primary); CBS/Fox (secondary)	
October 19	Saipan, Northern Mariana Islands	WSZE-TV	10	NBC (primary); CBS/ABC/Fox (secondary)	NBC (primary); CBS/Fox (secondary)	Satellite of KUAM-TV/Hagtna, Guam
December 5	Huntsville/Decatur/Florence, Alabama	WZDX	54	Independent	Fox	

== Births ==
Date	Name	Notability
January 2	Lauren Storm	Actress (Flight 29 Down)
January 2	Shelley Hennig	Actress (Days of Our Lives, The Secret Circle, Teen Wolf)
January 5	Kristin Cavallari	Actress (Laguna Beach: The Real Orange County, The Hills)
January 7	Lyndsy Fonseca	Actress (The Young and the Restless, How I Met Your Mother, Nikita, Agent Carter, Turner & Hooch)
January 8	Freddie Stroma	Actor
January 9	Pablo Santos	Mexican actor (Greetings from Tucson) (d. 2006)
January 12	Naya Rivera	Actress (The Royal Family, The Bernie Mac Show, Glee) (d. 2020)
January 17	Joy Taylor	American media personality
January 18	Zane Holtz	Canadian actor (Make It or Break It, From Dusk till Dawn: The Series) and model
January 20	Evan Peters	Actor (Phil of the Future, American Horror Story)
January 20	Mark Wright	TV personality
January 20	Pete Ploszek	Actor (Teen Wolf)
January 24	Ruth Bradley	Irish actress (Humans)
January 27	Kylie Sparks	Actress (Squaresville)
January 28	Misha Crosby	British actor (The Lying Game)
January 28	Chelsea Brummet	Actress (All That)
January 28	Katie Nolan	American sports television host
January 29	Alex Murrel	Actress (Laguna Beach: The Real Orange County)
February 1	Heather Morris	Actress (Glee) and singer
February 1	Ronda Rousey	Actress and martial artist (Total Divas, UFC, WWE, 9-1-1)
February 2	Martin Spanjers	Actor (8 Simple Rules, Good Luck Charlie)
February 5	Darren Criss	Actor (Glee, A Very Potter Musical, Transformers: Robots in Disguise) and singer
February 5	Alex Brightman	Actor
February 9	Henry Cejudo	Martial artist
February 9	Rose Leslie	Scottish actress (Game of Thrones, Downton Abbey)
February 11	Julio Torres	Actor
February 12	Gary LeRoi Gray	Actor (The Cosby Show, Even Stevens, Clifford the Big Red Dog, Rocket Power, The Fairly OddParents, Whatever Happened to... Robot Jones?)
February 19	Jeffery Self	Actor
February 20	Miles Teller	Actor
February 21	Elliot Page	Actor (Pit Pony, hosted Saturday Night Live, 2008)
February 21	Ashley Greene	Actress
February 24	Ulysses Cuadra	Voice actor (Rocket Power, Clifford the Big Red Dog, The Zeta Project)
February 25	Natalie Dreyfuss	Actress (Rita Rocks)
February 28	Michelle Horn	Actress
March 1	Kesha	American singer
March 9	Bow Wow	Rapper (host of 106 & Park)
March 10	Ser'Darius Blain	Actor
March 17	Rob Kardashian	Actor (Keeping Up with the Kardashians)
March 17	Zach Villa	Actor
March 19	Josie Loren	Actress
March 23	Jessica Marie Garcia	Actress
March 28	Mary Kate Wiles	Actress (The Lizzie Bennet Diaries, Squaresville) and singer
March 29	Lisandra Tena	Actress
April 1	Mackenzie Davis	Actress (Halt and Catch Fire)
April 2	Briga Heelan	Actress
April 3	Benjamin Stone	British actor (The Nine Lives of Chloe King)
April 3	Rachel Bloom	Actress and singer (Crazy Ex-Girlfriend)
April 4	Sarah Gadon	Canadian actress (My Dad the Rock Star, Ruby Gloom, Friends and Heroes, Total Drama)
April 7	Maria Molina	American meteorologist
April 9	Jesse McCartney	Actor (All My Children, Summerland, Young & Hungry, Young Justice), and singer
April 10	Jamie Renée Smith	Actress (Ask Harriet)
April 10	Shay Mitchell	Canadian actress (Pretty Little Liars)
April 12	Brooklyn Decker	Actress (Friends with Better Lives, Grace and Frankie) and model
April 12	Mike Manning	Actor (The Real World: D.C.)
April 12	Brendon Urie	Singer
April 12	Ilana Glazer	Actress
April 15	Samira Wiley	Actress (Orange is the New Black)
April 16	Jack Cutmore-Scott	Actor
April 17	Jacqueline MacInnes Wood	Actress (The Bold and the Beautiful)
April 18	Rosie Huntington-Whiteley	English actress
April 18	Ellen Woglom	American actress
April 19	Courtland Mead	Actor (Kirk, Nightmare Ned, Recess, Lloyd in Space)
April 20	John Patrick Amedori	Actor
April 26	Jessica Lee Rose	Actress (Lonelygirl15, Sorority Forever, Hooking Up)
April 27	William Moseley	English actor (The Royals)
May 2	Pat McAfee	Sports commentator (ESPN, WWE)
May 7	Aidy Bryant	Actress and comedian (Saturday Night Live, Danger & Eggs)
May 7	Maya Erskine	Actress and writer
May 10	Eileen April Boylan	Actress (South of Nowhere, Greek)
May 12	Robbie Rogers	Television producer
May 13	Candice King	Actress (The Vampire Diaries) and singer
May 15	Ersan İlyasova	Baseball player
May 19	Jayne Wisener	Irish actress (6Degrees)
May 21	Ashlie Brillault	Actress (Lizzie McGuire)
May 23	Bray Wyatt	Pro wrestler (WWE) (died 2023)
May 24	Bethany C. Meyers	American fitness and lifestyle entrepreneur
May 26	Brandi Cyrus	Actress (Hannah Montana, Cyrus vs. Cyrus: Design and Conquer)
May 27	Bella Heathcote	Australian actress (Neighbours)
May 29	Noah Reid	Canadian actor (Pippi Longstocking, Franklin, Rolie Polie Olie)
May 29	Joseph Haro	American actor
May 30	Javicia Leslie	Actress
May 31	Curtis Williams	Actor (The Parent 'Hood)
May 31	Shaun Fleming	Voice actor (Teacher's Pet, Kim Possible, Fillmore!, Lilo & Stitch: The Series)
May 31	Meredith Hagner	Actress (As the World Turns, Men at Work)
June 3	Lalaine	Actress (Lizzie McGuire)
June 3	Michelle Keegan	Actress
June 9	Rheagan Wallace	Actress
June 12	Chris Galya	Actor (Jessie)
June 16	Diana DeGarmo	Actress (The Young and the Restless)
June 16	Kelly Blatz	Actor (Aaron Stone, Glory Daze)
June 16	Abby Elliott	Actress (Saturday Night Live, Odd Mom Out) and daughter of Chris Elliott
June 17	Rebecca Breeds	Australian actress (The Originals)
June 18	Niels Schneider	French-Canadian actor
June 19	Chelsea J. Wilson	Actress (Lizzie McGuire)
June 22	Joe Dempsie	English actor (Skins, Game of Thrones)
June 22	Jerrod Carmichael	Comedian
June 23	Haley Strode	Actress (Wendell & Vinnie)
June 27	India de Beaufort	Actress
June 27	Ed Westwick	English actor (Gossip Girl)
July 3	Chris Hunter	Actor (South of Nowhere)
July 5	Charles Rogers	Actor
July 6	Matt O'Leary	Actor (Spy Kids)
July 7	Julianna Guill	Actress (My Alibi, Glory Daze, Girlfriends' Guide to Divorce)
July 11	Cristina Vee	Voice actress (Miraculous: Tales of Ladybug & Cat Noir, Sailor Moon)
July 12	Tilian Pearson	Singer
July 14	Charly Arnolt	Sports broadcaster and TV personality (WWE, ESPN, Fox News)
July 14	Sara Canning	Canadian actress (The Vampire Diaries)
July 14	Dan Reynolds	Singer
July 16	AnnaLynne McCord	Actress (American Heiress, 90210)
July 16	Kate Berlant	Actress
July 19	Jon Jones	Mixed martial artist
July 21	Peter Doocy	TV journalist
July 22	Bre-Z	Actress
July 24	Mara Wilson	Actress
July 25	Michael Welch	Actor
July 28	Asher Grodman	Actor
July 29	Genesis Rodriguez	Actress (Dame Chocolate, Big Hero 6: The Series)
July 31	Brittany Byrnes	Australian actress (H_{2}O: Just Add Water)
August 4	Sam Underwood	Actor
August 8	Katie Leung	Actress
August 8	Jenn Proske	Actress
August 10	Ari Boyland	New Zealand actor (Power Rangers RPM)
August 11	Jemima West	Anglo-American actress (15/Love, Maison Close, Indian Summers)
August 14	James Buckley	Actor
August 17	Manny Jacinto	Actor
August 18	Mika Boorem	Actress (The Tom Show)
August 21	Cody Kasch	Actor (Desperate Housewives)
August 25	Blake Lively	Actress (Gossip Girl)
August 26	Nieves Zuberbühler	Argentine journalist
August 27	Tiffany Boone	Actress
August 30	Johanna Braddy	Actress (Avatar: The Last Airbender, Greek, Video Game High School, UnREAL, Quantico)
September 2	Mazin Elsadig	Actor (Degrassi: The Next Generation, Stoked)
September 3	Megan Amram	Writer
September 5	Jeremy Vuolo	Player
September 5	Jenny Taft	American sports television personality
September 7	Evan Rachel Wood	Actress (Once and Again, Westworld) and singer
September 7	Lily Cowles	Actress
September 8	Wiz Khalifa	Actor and rapper
September 9	Clayton Snyder	Actor (Lizzie McGuire)
September 9	Taylor Bagley	Actress
September 10	Alex Saxon	Actor (The Fosters, Finding Carter, Nancy Drew)
September 11	Elizabeth Henstridge	Actress (Agents of S.H.I.E.L.D.)
September 11	Tyler Hoechlin	Actor (7th Heaven, Teen Wolf)
September 13	Erin Way	Actress (I Heart Vampires, Alphas)
September 16	Daren Kagasoff	Actor (The Secret Life of the American Teenager)
September 17	Augustus Prew	English actor (Prison Break)
September 19	Danielle Panabaker	Actress (Shark, The Flash)
September 20	Sarah Natochenny	Voice actress (Ash Ketchum on Pokémon)
September 22	Teyonah Parris	Actress (Mad Men, WandaVision)
September 23	Skylar Astin	Actor (Ground Floor, Graves, Trolls: The Beat Goes On!)
September 24	Grey Damon	Actor (Friday Night Lights, The Nine Lives of Chloe King, Twisted, Star-Crossed, Aquarius)
September 24	Spencer Treat Clark	Actor (Agents of S.H.I.E.L.D., Animal Kingdom)
September 28	Hilary Duff	Actress (Lizzie McGuire, Gossip Girl, Younger, How I Met Your Father) and singer
September 29	David Del Rio	Actor (The Troop)
October 1	Matthew Daddario	Actor (Shadowhunters)
October 2	Christopher Larkin	Actor (The 100)
October 2	Erika Lauren Wasilewski	Actress (The Real World: D.C.)
October 8	Griffin Frazen	Actor (Grounded for Life)
October 9	Melissa Villaseñor	Actress (Saturday Night Live)
October 10	Carla Esparza	Mixed martial artist
October 13	Ashley Newbrough	Actress (Privileged)
October 14	Jay Pharoah	Actor (Saturday Night Live)
October 15	Chantal Strand	Canadian voice actress (Dragon Tales, Sabrina: The Animated Series, Pucca)
October 18	Zac Efron	Actor (Summerland, High School Musical, Down to Earth with Zac Efron)
October 23	Leah Van Dale	Pro wrestler (WWE, Total Divas)
October 29	Cleopatra Coleman	Australian actress (The Last Man on Earth)
November 5	Kevin Jonas	Actor (Jonas, Married to Jonas) and singer (Jonas Brothers)
November 7	Rachele Brooke Smith	Actress
November 9	Emily Tyra	Actress
November 10	Jessica Tovey	Australian actress (Home and Away)
November 11	Giles Matthey	British-Australian actor (True Blood, Once Upon a Time)
November 19	Jake Abel	Actor
November 19	Jared Abrahamson	Actor
November 20	Amelia Rose Blaire	Actress (True Blood, Blue Bloods)
November 23	Snooki	American reality television personality
November 25	Dolla	American rapper (d. 2009)
November 28	Karen Gillan	Scottish actress (Doctor Who)
November 30	Trinity Fatu	Pro Wrestler (Total Divas)
November 30	Christel Khalil	Actress (The Young and the Restless)
November 30	Lauren Zima	American television personality
December 1	Sarah Snook	Actress
December 3	Michael Angarano	Actor (Cover Me, Will & Grace)
December 3	Dree Hemingway	Actress
December 4	Orlando Brown	Actor (Family Matters, Two of a Kind, That's So Raven, Waynehead, The Proud Family, Fillmore!, Clifford's Puppy Days) and rapper
December 6	Jack DeSena	Actor (All That, 100 Things to Do Before High School, Avatar: The Last Airbender)
December 7	Aaron Carter	Actor (House of Carters), singer and brother of Nick Carter (died 2022)
December 11	Alex Russell	Australian actor
December 12	Kate Todd	Canadian actress
December 13	Michael Socha	English actor (Once Upon a Time)
December 16	Hallee Hirsh	Actress (ER, Flight 29 Down)
December 28	Taylor Ball	Actor (Still Standing)
December 28	Hannah Tointon	English actress (Kerching!, Dream Team, Hollyoaks) and sister of Kara Tointon
December 28	Thomas Dekker	Actor (Terminator: The Sarah Connor Chronicles, The Secret Circle, Backstrom)
December 28	Adam Gregory	Actor (90210, Winx Club, The Bold and the Beautiful)
December 29	Iain De Caestecker	Actor (Agents of S.H.I.E.L.D.)

== Deaths ==
Date	Name	Age	Notability
January 1	Lloyd Haynes	52	Actor (Room 222)
February 4	Liberace	67	American pianist, singer and actor
February 22	David Susskind	66	Commentator and producer (The David Susskind Show)
February 25	James Coco	56	Actor
March 3	Danny Kaye	76	Actor & comedian (The Danny Kaye Show)
March 21	Dean Paul Martin	35	Actor (Misfits of Science) and singer (Dino, Desi & Billy)
March 28	Patrick Troughton	67	Actor (the Second Doctor on Doctor Who from 1966 to 1969)
April 17	Dick Shawn	63	Actor
April 19	Milt Kahl	78	Animator
May 4	Cathryn Damon	56	Actress (Mary on Soap)
May 14	Rita Hayworth	68	Actress and singer
May 31	Roy Winsor	75	Soap opera writer (Search for Tomorrow)
June 22	Fred Astaire	88	Actor and singer
June 24	Jackie Gleason	71	Actor (The Honeymooners, The Jackie Gleason Show)
August 11	Clara Peller	85	Wendy's spokesperson (Where's the Beef? ad campaign)
August 19	Hayden Rorke	76	Actor (Dr. Bellows on I Dream of Jeannie)
September 5	Quinn Martin	65	Executive producer (The Fugitive and many others)
September 11	Lorne Greene	72	Actor (Ben Cartwright on Bonanza)
September 22	Dan Rowan	65	Comedian (co-host of Laugh-In)
September 22	Carman Maxwell	84	Voice actor (Bosko on Looney Tunes)
September 25	Mary Astor	81	Actress

== Television debuts ==
- Patricia Arquette – Daddy
- Billy Crudup – General College
- Chris Elliott – Miami Vice
- Juliette Lewis – Home Fires
- Brad Pitt – Another World
- Joely Richardson – Kin of the Castle
- Chris Rock – Miami Vice

== See also ==
- 1987 in the United States
- List of American films of 1987
