= 1986–87 United States network television schedule =

US primetime network television schedule for the fall of 1986

The 1986–87 network television schedule for the three major English language commercial broadcast networks in the United States covers primetime hours from September 1986 through August 1987. The schedule is followed by a list per network of returning series, new series, and series cancelled after the 1985–86 season.

Although Fox debuted as a fourth network effort in October 1986, the network waited until April 1987 to commence offering prime time programming, effectively deferring its first Fall programming season until September 1987.

PBS is not included, as member television stations have local flexibility over most of their schedule and broadcast times for network shows vary.

Each of the 30 highest-rated shows is listed with its rank and rating as determined by Nielsen Media Research.

== Legend ==
- Light blue indicates local programming.
- Gray indicates encore programming.
- Blue-gray indicates news programming.
- Light green indicates sporting events.
- Red indicates series being burned off and other irregularly scheduled programs, including specials and movies.
- Light gold indicates programming produced outside of the United States.
- highlight Lime highlights indicates the number-one most watched program of the season.
- highlight Yellow highlights indicates the top-10 most watched programs of the season.
- highlight Cyan highlights indicates numbers 11-20 most watched programs of the season.
- highlight Magenta highlights indicates numbers 21-30 most watched programs of the season.
- highlight Highlights indicates that it falls in multiple of the above categories.

== Schedule ==
- New series are highlighted in **bold**.
- All times are U.S. Eastern Time and Pacific Time (except for some live sports or events). Subtract one hour for Central, Mountain, Alaska and Hawaii–Aleutian times.

=== Sunday ===
Network		7:00 p.m.	7:30 p.m.	8:00 p.m.	8:30 p.m.	9:00 p.m.	9:30 p.m.	10:00 p.m.	10:30 p.m.
ABC		The Disney Sunday Movie				The ABC Sunday Night Movie			
CBS	Fall	60 Minutes (6/23.3)		Murder, She Wrote (4/25.4)		CBS Sunday Movie (16/18.6) (Tied with **Matlock** and The NBC Monday Movie)			
CBS	Winter	60 Minutes (6/23.3)		Murder, She Wrote (4/25.4)		**Designing Women**	**Nothing is Easy**	**Hard Copy**	
CBS	Spring	60 Minutes (6/23.3)		Murder, She Wrote (4/25.4)		CBS Sunday Movie (16/18.6) (Tied with **Matlock** and The NBC Monday Movie)			
CBS	Summer	60 Minutes (6/23.3)		Murder, She Wrote (4/25.4)		CBS Sunday Movie (16/18.6) (Tied with **Matlock** and The NBC Monday Movie)			
Fox (begins April 5, 1987)	Spring	**21 Jump Street**		**Married... with Children**	**The Tracey Ullman Show**	**Mr. President**	**Duet**	Local programming	
Fox (begins April 5, 1987)	Summer	**21 Jump Street**		**Married... with Children**	**Duet** (R)	**Mr. President**	**Duet**	Local programming	
NBC	Fall	**Our House**		**Easy Street**	Valerie	NBC Sunday Night at the Movies (20/18.2)			
NBC	Winter	**Our House**		**Easy Street**	Valerie	NBC Sunday Night at the Movies (20/18.2)			
NBC	Spring	**Our House**		**Rags to Riches**		NBC Sunday Night at the Movies (20/18.2)			
NBC	Summer	The A-Team (R)		**Our House** (R)		NBC Sunday Night at the Movies (20/18.2)			
NBC	Mid-summer	**Our House** (R)		**Rags to Riches** (R)		NBC Sunday Night at the Movies (20/18.2)			
NBC	Late summer	**Our House** (R)		Family Ties (R)	Family Ties (R)	NBC Sunday Night at the Movies (20/18.2)			

Note:

- The "opening night" of the Fox network on April 5, 1987 featured the premieres of **Married... with Children** and **The Tracey Ullman Show** at 7:00 and 7:30 p.m. respectively, both shows being repeated twice. **21 Jump Street** debuted on April 12 with two episodes airing back-to-back. **Duet** aired its first two episodes on April 19. **Down and Out in Beverly Hills** premiered on April 26, but was put on hiatus and eventually aired during the summer. Its slot was taken over by **Mr. President**, which premiered on May 3. **Fox Night at the Movies** aired on an irregular basis at 8 p.m. during the summer.
- Family Ties consisted of assorted repeats of previous seasons, with current reruns airing on the show's regular 8:30 p.m. Thursday night slot.

=== Monday ===
Network		8:00 p.m.	8:30 p.m.	9:00 p.m.	9:30 p.m.	10:00 p.m.	10:30 p.m.
ABC	Fall	MacGyver		Monday Night Football (18/18.4)			
ABC	Winter	MacGyver		The ABC Monday Night Movie			
ABC	Spring	Monday Night Baseball					
ABC	Summer	Monday Night Baseball					
CBS	Fall	Kate & Allie (19/18.3)	**My Sister Sam** (22/17.4) (Tied with **L.A. Law**)	Newhart (12/19.5)	**Designing Women**	Cagney & Lacey	
CBS	Winter	Kate & Allie (19/18.3)	**My Sister Sam** (22/17.4) (Tied with **L.A. Law**)	Newhart (12/19.5)	**The Cavanaughs**	Cagney & Lacey	
CBS	Spring	Kate & Allie (19/18.3)	**My Sister Sam** (22/17.4) (Tied with **L.A. Law**)	Newhart (12/19.5)	**Designing Women**	Cagney & Lacey	
CBS	Summer	Kate & Allie (19/18.3)	**My Sister Sam** (22/17.4) (Tied with **L.A. Law**)	Newhart (12/19.5)	**Designing Women**	Cagney & Lacey	
NBC	Fall	**ALF** (28/16.5) (Tied with Hunter)	Amazing Stories	NBC Monday Night at the Movies (17/18.6) (Tied with **Matlock** and The CBS Sunday Movie)			
NBC	Winter	**ALF** (28/16.5) (Tied with Hunter)	Amazing Stories	NBC Monday Night at the Movies (17/18.6) (Tied with **Matlock** and The CBS Sunday Movie)			
NBC	Spring	**ALF** (28/16.5) (Tied with Hunter)	Valerie	NBC Monday Night at the Movies (17/18.6) (Tied with **Matlock** and The CBS Sunday Movie)			
NBC	Summer	**ALF** (28/16.5) (Tied with Hunter)	Valerie	NBC Monday Night at the Movies (17/18.6) (Tied with **Matlock** and The CBS Sunday Movie)			

=== Tuesday ===
Network		8:00 p.m.	8:30 p.m.	9:00 p.m.	9:30 p.m.	10:00 p.m.	10:30 p.m.
ABC	Fall	Who's the Boss? (10/22.0)	Growing Pains (8/22.7)	Moonlighting (9/22.4)		**Jack and Mike**	
ABC	Winter	Who's the Boss? (10/22.0)	Growing Pains (8/22.7)	Moonlighting (9/22.4)		**Jack and Mike**	
ABC	Spring	Who's the Boss? (10/22.0)	Growing Pains (8/22.7)	Moonlighting (9/22.4)		**Max Headroom**	
ABC	Summer	Who's the Boss? (10/22.0)	Growing Pains (8/22.7)	Moonlighting (9/22.4)		Spenser: For Hire (R)	
CBS	Fall	**The Wizard**		CBS Tuesday Night Movie			
CBS	Winter	**Spies**		CBS Tuesday Night Movie			
CBS	Spring	West 57th		CBS Tuesday Night Movie			
CBS	Summer	**The Wizard** (R)		CBS Tuesday Night Movie			
CBS	Mid-summer	Simon & Simon (R)		**Houston Knights** (R)		Night Heat (Note: Canadian-produced series, usually aired on CBS' late night crime series block)	
NBC	Fall	**Matlock** (15/18.6) (Tied with The CBS Sunday Movie and The NBC Monday Movie)		**Crime Story**		1986	
NBC	Mid-fall	**Matlock** (15/18.6) (Tied with The CBS Sunday Movie and The NBC Monday Movie)		Hill Street Blues		1986	
NBC	Winter	**Matlock** (15/18.6) (Tied with The CBS Sunday Movie and The NBC Monday Movie)		Hill Street Blues		Remington Steele	
NBC	Spring	**Matlock** (15/18.6) (Tied with The CBS Sunday Movie and The NBC Monday Movie)		Gimme a Break!	**Easy Street**	Hill Street Blues	
NBC	Mid-spring	**Matlock** (15/18.6) (Tied with The CBS Sunday Movie and The NBC Monday Movie)		Gimme a Break!	**The Tortellis**	Hill Street Blues	
NBC	Summer	**Matlock** (15/18.6) (Tied with The CBS Sunday Movie and The NBC Monday Movie)		NBC Tuesday Night at the Movies			

Note:

- **Jack and Mike** premiered with a 90-minute pilot on September 16 at 9 p.m.

=== Wednesday ===
Network		8:00 p.m.	8:30 p.m.	9:00 p.m.	9:30 p.m.	10:00 p.m.	10:30 p.m.
ABC	Fall	Perfect Strangers	**Head of the Class** (30/16.4)	Dynasty (25/17.2) (Tied with Highway to Heaven)		Hotel	
ABC	Winter	Perfect Strangers	**Head of the Class** (30/16.4)	Dynasty (25/17.2) (Tied with Highway to Heaven)		Hotel	
ABC	Spring	Perfect Strangers	**Harry**	Dynasty (25/17.2) (Tied with Highway to Heaven)		Hotel	
ABC	Mid-spring	Perfect Strangers	**Head of the Class** (30/16.4)	Dynasty (25/17.2) (Tied with Highway to Heaven)		**Mariah**	
ABC	Summer	Perfect Strangers	**Head of the Class** (30/16.4)	MacGyver (R)		Hotel (R)	
CBS	Fall	**Together We Stand**	**Better Days**	Magnum, P.I.		The Equalizer	
CBS	Late fall	The New Mike Hammer		Magnum, P.I.		The Equalizer	
CBS	Winter	The New Mike Hammer		Magnum, P.I.		The Equalizer	
CBS	Spring	The New Mike Hammer		Magnum, P.I.		**Houston Knights**	
CBS	Mid-spring	**Roxie**	**Take Five**	Magnum, P.I.		**Houston Knights**	
CBS	Late spring	The New Mike Hammer (R)		Magnum, P.I.		**Houston Knights**	
CBS	Mid-summer	The New Mike Hammer (R)		Magnum, P.I.		The Equalizer (R)	
NBC	Fall	Highway to Heaven (24/17.2) (Tied with Dynasty)		Gimme a Break!	You Again?	St. Elsewhere	
NBC	Winter	Highway to Heaven (24/17.2) (Tied with Dynasty)		Gimme a Break!	**The Tortellis**	St. Elsewhere	
NBC	Late winter	Highway to Heaven (24/17.2) (Tied with Dynasty)		Night Court (7/23.2)	**The Tortellis**	**The Bronx Zoo**	
NBC	Spring	Highway to Heaven (24/17.2) (Tied with Dynasty)		Night Court (7/23.2)	**Easy Street**	**The Bronx Zoo**	
NBC	Mid-spring	Highway to Heaven (24/17.2) (Tied with Dynasty)		Night Court (7/23.2)	**Easy Street**	St. Elsewhere	
NBC	Summer	Highway to Heaven (24/17.2) (Tied with Dynasty)		The Facts of Life (R)	Night Court (R)	St. Elsewhere	
NBC	Mid-summer	Highway to Heaven (24/17.2) (Tied with Dynasty)		Night Court (R)	Various programming (Note: Sitcom repeats and specials)	St. Elsewhere	
NBC	Late summer	Highway to Heaven (24/17.2) (Tied with Dynasty)		**The Bronx Zoo** (R)		St. Elsewhere	

Note:

- On CBS, **Roxie** and **Take Five** premiered on April 1, 1987 at 8 and 8:30 p.m. respectively, but were both cancelled after only two episodes.

=== Thursday ===
Network		8:00 p.m.	8:30 p.m.	9:00 p.m.	9:30 p.m.	10:00 p.m.	10:30 p.m.
ABC	Fall	**Our World**		The Colbys		20/20	
ABC	Winter	**Our World**		The Colbys		20/20	
ABC	Spring	**Our World**		**Jack and Mike**		20/20	
ABC	Summer	**Our World**		**Heart of the City** (R)		20/20	
ABC	Mid-summer	**Starman** (R)		**Our World**		20/20	
ABC	Late summer	**Sledge Hammer!** (R)	**The Charmings** (R)	**Our World**		20/20	
CBS	Fall	Simon & Simon		Knots Landing (26/16.8) (Tied with Miami Vice)		**Kay O'Brien**	
CBS	Mid-fall	The Twilight Zone	Simon & Simon		**Designing Women**	Knots Landing (26/16.8) (Tied with Miami Vice)	
CBS	Winter	**Shell Game**		Simon & Simon		Knots Landing (26/16.8) (Tied with Miami Vice)	
CBS	Mid-winter	**The Wizard**		Simon & Simon		Knots Landing (26/16.8) (Tied with Miami Vice)	
CBS	Spring	**The Wizard**		Simon & Simon		Knots Landing (26/16.8) (Tied with Miami Vice)	
CBS	Summer	Scarecrow and Mrs. King (R)		Simon & Simon		Knots Landing (26/16.8) (Tied with Miami Vice)	
CBS	Mid-summer	Scarecrow and Mrs. King (R)		CBS Thursday Night Movie			
NBC	Fall	The Cosby Show (1/34.9)	Family Ties (2/32.7)	Cheers (3/27.2)	Night Court (7/23.2)	Hill Street Blues	
NBC	Mid-fall	The Cosby Show (1/34.9)	Family Ties (2/32.7)	Cheers (3/27.2)	Night Court (7/23.2)	**L.A. Law** (21/17.4) (Tied with **My Sister Sam**)	
NBC	Winter	The Cosby Show (1/34.9)	Family Ties (2/32.7)	Cheers (3/27.2)	Night Court (7/23.2)	**L.A. Law** (21/17.4) (Tied with **My Sister Sam**)	
NBC	Spring	The Cosby Show (1/34.9)	Family Ties (2/32.7)	Cheers (3/27.2)	**Nothing in Common**	**L.A. Law** (21/17.4) (Tied with **My Sister Sam**)	
NBC	Summer	The Cosby Show (1/34.9)	Family Ties (2/32.7)	Cheers (3/27.2)	**The Days and Nights of Molly Dodd**	**L.A. Law** (21/17.4) (Tied with **My Sister Sam**)	
NBC	Late summer	The Cosby Show (1/34.9)	Family Ties (2/32.7)	Cheers (3/27.2)	Night Court (R)	**L.A. Law** (21/17.4) (Tied with **My Sister Sam**)	

Note:

- **Crime Story** premiered with a two-hour pilot on September 18 at 9 p.m.

=== Friday ===
Network		8:00 p.m.	8:30 p.m.	9:00 p.m.	9:30 p.m.	10:00 p.m.	10:30 p.m.
ABC	Fall	Webster	Mr. Belvedere	**Sidekicks**	**Sledge Hammer!**	**Starman**	
ABC	Late fall	Webster	Mr. Belvedere	**Dads**	**Gung Ho**	**Starman**	
ABC	Winter	Webster	Mr. Belvedere	**Gung Ho**	**Dads**	**Starman**	
ABC	Mid-winter	Webster	Mr. Belvedere	The ABC Friday Night Movie			
ABC	Late winter	**The Charmings**	Webster	The ABC Friday Night Movie			
ABC	Spring	**The Charmings**	Webster	The ABC Friday Night Movie			
ABC	Summer	**Sledge Hammer!** (R)	Mr. Belvedere (R)	The ABC Friday Night Movie			
ABC	Late summer	Webster (R)	Mr. Belvedere (R)	**Max Headroom** (R)		**Starman** (R)	
CBS	Fall	Scarecrow and Mrs. King		Dallas (11/21.3)		Falcon Crest (23/17.3)	
CBS	Winter	Scarecrow and Mrs. King		Dallas (11/21.3)		Falcon Crest (23/17.3)	
CBS	Spring	**Nothing Is Easy** (Note: Formerly Together We Stand)	**The Popcorn Kid**	Dallas (11/21.3)		Falcon Crest (23/17.3)	
CBS	Summer	**CBS Summer Playhouse**		Dallas (11/21.3)		**Hard Copy**	
CBS	Mid-summer	**CBS Summer Playhouse**		Dallas (11/21.3)		Adderly	
NBC	Fall	The A-Team		Miami Vice (27/16.8) (Tied with Knots Landing)		**L.A. Law** (21/17.9) (Tied with **My Sister Sam**)	
NBC	Mid-fall	The A-Team		Miami Vice (27/16.8) (Tied with Knots Landing)		**Crime Story**	
NBC	Winter	Stingray		Miami Vice (27/16.8) (Tied with Knots Landing)		**Crime Story**	
NBC	Spring	**Roomies**	Amazing Stories	Miami Vice (27/16.8) (Tied with Knots Landing)		Stingray	
NBC	Summer	Stingray (R)		Miami Vice (27/16.8) (Tied with Knots Landing)		**Crime Story** (R)	
NBC	Late summer	**Rags to Riches** (R)		Miami Vice (27/16.8) (Tied with Knots Landing)		**Crime Story** (R)	

=== Saturday ===
Network		8:00 p.m.	8:30 p.m.	9:00 p.m.	9:30 p.m.	10:00 p.m.	10:30 p.m.
ABC	Fall	**Life with Lucy**	**The Ellen Burstyn Show**	**Heart of the City**		Spenser: For Hire	
ABC	Late fall	**Sidekicks**	**Sledge Hammer!**	**Heart of the City**		Spenser: For Hire	
ABC	Winter	**Sidekicks**	**Sledge Hammer!**	**Ohara**		Spenser: For Hire	
ABC	Spring	**Starman**		**Ohara**		Spenser: For Hire	
ABC	Summer	Webster (R)	**Sidekicks**	**Gung Ho** (R)	**Dads** (R)	**Starman** (R)	
ABC	Mid-summer	Webster (R)	The ABC Saturday Night Movie				
ABC	Late summer	**Animal Crack-Ups**	**The Ellen Burstyn Show**	The ABC Saturday Night Movie			
CBS	Fall	**Downtown**		The New Mike Hammer (Note: The New Mike Hammer was a continuation of Mickey Spillane's Mike Hammer, which had abruptly ceased production in 1984 because of Stacy Keach's legal problems.)		The Twilight Zone	
CBS	Mid-fall	**The Wizard**		The New Mike Hammer		The Twilight Zone	
CBS	Late fall	**Downtown**		The New Mike Hammer		The Twilight Zone	
CBS	Winter	**Outlaws**		The CBS Saturday Night Movie			
CBS	Spring	The CBS Saturday Night Movie				West 57th	
CBS	Summer	The CBS Saturday Night Movie				West 57th	
Fox (begins July 11, 1987)	Mid-summer	**Down and Out in Beverly Hills**	**The New Adventures of Beans Baxter**	**Werewolf**	**Karen's Song**	Local programming	
Fox (begins July 11, 1987)	Late summer	**Werewolf**	**The New Adventures of Beans Baxter**	**Down and Out in Beverly Hills**	**Karen's Song**	Local programming	
NBC	Fall	The Facts of Life	227 (14/18.9)	The Golden Girls (5/24.5)	**Amen** (13/19.4)	Hunter (28/16.5) (Tied with **ALF**)	
NBC	Winter	The Facts of Life	227 (14/18.9)	The Golden Girls (5/24.5)	**Amen** (13/19.4)	Hunter (28/16.5) (Tied with **ALF**)	
NBC	Spring	The Facts of Life	227 (14/18.9)	The Golden Girls (5/24.5)	**Amen** (13/19.4)	Hunter (28/16.5) (Tied with **ALF**)	
NBC	Mid-spring	The Facts of Life	**Sweet Surrender**	The Golden Girls (5/24.5)	Me & Mrs. C	Hunter (28/16.5) (Tied with **ALF**)	
NBC	Late spring	The Facts of Life	227 (14/18.9)	The Golden Girls (5/24.5)	Me & Mrs. C	Hunter (28/16.5) (Tied with **ALF**)	
NBC	Summer	227 (R)	Me & Mrs. C	The Golden Girls (5/24.5)	**Amen** (R)	Hunter (28/16.5) (Tied with **ALF**)	
NBC	Mid-summer	The Facts of Life (R)	227 (R)	The Golden Girls (5/24.5)	**Amen** (R)	Hunter (28/16.5) (Tied with **ALF**)	

Notes:

- The Fox network added its Saturday night line-up on July 11, 1987 with the two-hour premiere of **Werewolf**. **The New Adventures of Beans Baxter** and **Karen's Song** premiered on July 18 (the former with an hour-long episode), and **Down and Out in Beverly Hills** joined the line-up on July 25.
- **Animal Crack-Ups** was a "summer preview" of the Saturday morning series.

== By network ==
=== ABC ===
Returning Series

- 20/20
- The ABC Friday Night Movie
- The ABC Monday Night Movie
- The ABC Saturday Night Movie
- The ABC Sunday Night Movie
- The Colbys
- The Disney Sunday Movie
- Dynasty
- Growing Pains
- Hotel
- MacGyver
- Mr. Belvedere
- Monday Night Baseball
- Monday Night Football
- Moonlighting
- Perfect Strangers
- Spenser: For Hire
- Webster
- Who's the Boss?

New Series

- The ABC Saturday Night Movie
- Animal Crack-Ups * +
- The Charmings *
- Dads *
- The Ellen Burstyn Show
- Gung Ho *
- Harry *
- Head of the Class
- Heart of the City
- Jack and Mike
- Life with Lucy
- Mariah
- Max Headroom *
- Ohara *
- Our World
- Sidekicks
- Sledge Hammer!
- Starman

Not returning from 1985–86:

- The ABC Thursday Night Movie
- Benson
- Diff'rent Strokes
- The Fall Guy
- Hardcastle and McCormick
- Hollywood Beat
- The Insiders
- Lady Blue
- Life's Most Embarrassing Moments
- Lime Street
- The Love Boat
- Our Family Honor
- The Redd Foxx Show
- Ripley's Believe It or Not!
- Shadow Chasers

+ Animal Crack-Ups had a short run in prime time before moving to Saturday mornings in the fall of 1987.

=== CBS ===
Returning Series

- 60 Minutes
- Cagney & Lacey
- CBS Sunday Movie
- Dallas
- The Equalizer
- Falcon Crest
- Kate & Allie
- Knots Landing
- Magnum, P.I.
- The New Mike Hammer +
- Murder, She Wrote
- Newhart
- Scarecrow and Mrs. King
- Simon & Simon
- The Twilight Zone
- West 57th *

New Series

- Better Days
- The Cavanaughs *
- CBS Summer Playhouse *
- Designing Women
- Downtown
- Hard Copy *
- Houston Knights *
- Kay O'Brien
- My Sister Sam
- Outlaws *
- The Popcorn Kid *
- Roxie *
- Shell Game *
- Spies *
- Take Five *
- Together We Stand/Nothing Is Easy
- The Wizard

Not returning from 1985–86:

- Airwolf
- Bridges to Cross
- Charlie & Co.
- Crazy Like a Fox
- Fast Times
- Foley Square
- George Burns Comedy Week
- Hometown
- Leo & Liz in Beverly Hills
- Mary
- Melba
- Morningstar/Eveningstar
- Stir Crazy
- Tough Cookies
- Trapper John, M.D.

+ This was a revival of the 1984–1985 series following star Stacy Keach's release from prison on drug charges.

=== Fox ===
New Series

- 21 Jump Street
- Down and Out in Beverly Hills
- Duet
- Fox Night at the Movies
- Karen's Song
- Married... with Children
- Mr. President
- The New Adventures of Beans Baxter
- The Tracey Ullman Show
- Werewolf

=== NBC ===
Returning Series

- 1986
- 227
- The A-Team
- Amazing Stories
- Cheers
- The Cosby Show
- The Facts of Life
- Family Ties
- Gimme a Break!
- The Golden Girls
- Highway to Heaven
- Hill Street Blues
- Hunter
- Me & Mrs. C *
- Miami Vice
- NBC Sunday Night Movie
- NBC Monday Night at the Movies
- Night Court
- Remington Steele *
- St. Elsewhere
- Stingray *
- Valerie
- You Again?

New Series

- ALF
- Amen
- The Bronx Zoo *
- Crime Story
- The Days and Nights of Molly Dodd *
- Easy Street
- L.A. Law
- Matlock
- Nothing in Common *
- Our House
- Rags to Riches *
- Roomies *
- Sweet Surrender *
- The Tortellis *

Not returning from 1985–86:

- Alfred Hitchcock Presents (Moved to USA Network)
- All Is Forgiven
- Blacke's Magic
- Fathers and Sons
- Hell Town
- Knight Rider
- The Last Precinct
- Misfits of Science
- Punky Brewster ^
- Riptide
- Silver Spoons ^
- TV's Bloopers & Practical Jokes

Note: The * indicates that the program was introduced in midseason. An ^ indicates a show that continued in first-run syndication after the network cancelled it.

== See also ==
- 1986–87 United States network television schedule (daytime)
- 1986–87 United States network television schedule (late night)
