= 1986–87 United States network television schedule (daytime) =

The following is the 1986–87 daytime network television schedule for the three major English-language commercial broadcast networks in the United States. It covers the weekday and weekend daytime hours from September 1986 to August 1987.

== Legend ==
- Light yellow indicates talk shows.
- Green indicates soap operas.
- Pink indicates game shows.
- Gold indicates news and public affairs programming.
- Light teal indicates sporting events.
- White indicates local programming.
- Light purple indicates children's programming.
- Gray indicates encore programming (e.g., reruns of prime-time programming).
- New series are highlighted in **bold**.

== Schedule ==
- All times correspond to U.S. Eastern and Pacific Time scheduling (except for some live sports or events). Except where affiliates slot certain programs outside their network-dictated timeslots, subtract one hour for Central, Mountain, Alaska, and Hawaii-Aleutian times.
- Local schedules may differ, as affiliates have the option to pre-empt or delay network programs. Such scheduling may be limited to preemptions caused by local or national breaking news or weather coverage (which may force stations to tape delay certain programs to later timeslots) and any major sports events scheduled to air in a weekday timeslot (mainly during major holidays). Stations may air shows at other times at their preference.

=== Monday–Friday ===
Network		6:00 am	6:30 am	7:00 am	7:30 am	8:00 am	8:30 am	9:00 am	9:30 am	10:00 am	10:30 am	11:00 am	11:30 am	noon	12:30 pm	1:00 pm	1:30 pm	2:00 pm	2:30 pm	3:00 pm	3:30 pm	4:00 pm	4:30 pm	5:00 pm	5:30 pm	6:00 pm	6:30 pm
ABC	Fall	ABC World News This Morning		Good Morning America				Local/syndicated programming				Fame, Fortune and Romance	**Double Talk**	Ryan's Hope	Loving	All My Children		One Life to Live		General Hospital		Local/syndicated programming					ABC World News Tonight with Peter Jennings
ABC	Winter	ABC World News This Morning		Good Morning America				Local/syndicated programming				Fame, Fortune and Romance	**Webster**	Ryan's Hope	Loving	All My Children		One Life to Live		General Hospital		Local/syndicated programming					ABC World News Tonight with Peter Jennings
ABC	Summer	ABC World News This Morning		Good Morning America				Local/syndicated programming				**Who's the Boss?**	**Bargain Hunters**	Ryan's Hope	Loving	All My Children		One Life to Live		General Hospital		Local/syndicated programming					ABC World News Tonight with Peter Jennings
CBS	Fall	CBS Early Morning News		The CBS Morning News				Local/syndicated programming		The $25,000 Pyramid	Card Sharks	The Price Is Right		Local/syndicated programming	The Young and the Restless		As the World Turns		Capitol	Guiding Light		Local/syndicated programming					CBS Evening News with Dan Rather
CBS	Winter	CBS Morning News			**The Morning Program**			Local/syndicated programming		The $25,000 Pyramid	Card Sharks	The Price Is Right		Local/syndicated programming	The Young and the Restless		As the World Turns		Capitol	Guiding Light		Local/syndicated programming					CBS Evening News with Dan Rather
CBS	Spring	CBS Morning News			**The Morning Program**			Local/syndicated programming		The $25,000 Pyramid	Card Sharks	The Price Is Right		Local/syndicated programming	The Young and the Restless		**The Bold and the Beautiful**	As the World Turns		Guiding Light		Local/syndicated programming					CBS Evening News with Dan Rather
NBC	Fall	NBC News at Sunrise		Today				Local/syndicated programming		Family Ties	Sale of the Century	Wheel of Fortune	Scrabble	Super Password	Search for Tomorrow	Days of Our Lives		Another World		Santa Barbara		Local/syndicated programming					NBC Nightly News with Tom Brokaw
NBC	Winter	NBC News at Sunrise		Today				Local/syndicated programming		Sale of the Century	**Blockbusters**	Wheel of Fortune	Scrabble	Super Password	**Wordplay**	Days of Our Lives		Another World		Santa Barbara		Local/syndicated programming					NBC Nightly News with Tom Brokaw
NBC	Spring	Before Hours (15 min.); NBC News at Sunrise		Today				Local/syndicated programming		Sale of the Century	**Classic Concentration**	Wheel of Fortune	Scrabble	Super Password	**Wordplay**	Days of Our Lives		Another World		Santa Barbara		Local/syndicated programming					NBC Nightly News with Tom Brokaw

=== Saturday ===
Network		7:00 am	7:30 am	8:00 am	8:30 am	9:00 am	9:30 am	10:00 am	10:30 am	11:00 am	11:30 am	noon	12:30 pm	1:00 pm	1:30 pm	2:00 pm	2:30 pm	3:00 pm	3:30 pm	4:00 pm	4:30 pm	5:00 pm	5:30 pm	6:00 pm	6:30 pm
ABC	Fall	Local and/or syndicated programming		Wuzzles (R)	**The Care Bears Family**	**The Flintstone Kids**		**The Real Ghostbusters**	**Pound Puppies**	The Bugs Bunny and Tweety Show	The All-New Ewoks	ABC Weekend Special	American Bandstand	College Football on ABC											
ABC	Winter	Local and/or syndicated programming		Wuzzles (R)	**The Care Bears Family**	**The Flintstone Kids**		**The Real Ghostbusters**	**Pound Puppies**	The Bugs Bunny and Tweety Show	The All-New Ewoks	ABC Weekend Special	American Bandstand	ABC Sports and/or local programming										Local news	ABC World News Saturday
CBS	Fall	Local and/or syndicated programming		The Berenstain Bears	**Wildfire**	Jim Henson's Muppet Babies		**Galaxy High**	**Teen Wolf**	**Pee-wee's Playhouse**	The Puppy's Great Adventures	Hulk Hogan's Rock 'n' Wrestling		CBS Sports and/or local programming										Local news	CBS Evening News
CBS	November	Local and/or syndicated programming		The Berenstain Bears	**Wildfire**	Jim Henson's Muppet Babies		Pee-wee's Playhouse	**Teen Wolf**	Galaxy High	Richie Rich (R)	Hulk Hogan's Rock 'n' Wrestling		CBS Sports and/or local programming										Local news	CBS Evening News
CBS	Winter	Local and/or syndicated programming		The Berenstain Bears	**Wildfire**	Jim Henson's Muppet Babies		Pee-wee's Playhouse	**Teen Wolf**	Galaxy High	CBS Storybreak	Hulk Hogan's Rock 'n' Wrestling		CBS Sports and/or local programming										Local news	CBS Evening News
CBS	Summer	Local and/or syndicated programming		The Berenstain Bears	**Wildfire**	Jim Henson's Muppet Babies		Pee-wee's Playhouse	**Teen Wolf**	Dungeons & Dragons (R)	Land of the Lost (R)	Galaxy High	CBS Storybreak	CBS Sports and/or local programming										Local news	CBS Evening News
NBC	Fall	Local and/or syndicated programming		**Kissyfur**	Adventures of the Gummi Bears	The Smurfs			Punky Brewster	Alvin and the Chipmunks	**Foofur**	**Lazer Tag Academy**	Kidd Video (R)	NBC Sports and/or local programming										Local news	NBC Nightly News
NBC	November	Local and/or syndicated programming		**Kissyfur**	Adventures of the Gummi Bears	The Smurfs			Alvin and the Chipmunks	Foofur	Punky Brewster	**Lazer Tag Academy**	Kidd Video (R)	NBC Sports and/or local programming										Local news	NBC Nightly News
NBC	June	Local and/or syndicated programming		**Kissyfur**	Adventures of the Gummi Bears	The Smurfs			Alvin and the Chipmunks	Foofur	Punky Brewster	**Lazer Tag Academy**	**Main Street**	NBC Sports and/or local programming										Local news	NBC Nightly News
NBC	August	Local and/or syndicated programming		**Kissyfur**	Adventures of the Gummi Bears	The Smurfs			Alvin and the Chipmunks	Foofur	Punky Brewster	**Lazer Tag Academy**	Punky Brewster	NBC Sports and/or local programming										Local news	NBC Nightly News

=== Sunday ===
Network		7:00 am	7:30 am	8:00 am	8:30 am	9:00 am	9:30 am	10:00 am	10:30 am	11:00 am	11:30 am	noon	12:30 pm	1:00 pm	1:30 pm	2:00 pm	2:30 pm	3:00 pm	3:30 pm	4:00 pm	4:30 pm	5:00 pm	5:30 pm	6:00 pm	6:30 pm
ABC		Local and/or syndicated programming							This Week with David Brinkley		ABC Sports and/or local programming													Local news	ABC World News Sunday
CBS	Fall	Local and/or syndicated programming				CBS News Sunday Morning			Face the Nation	Local and/or syndicated programming		The NFL Today	NFL on CBS and/or local programming												
CBS	Mid-winter	Local and/or syndicated programming				CBS News Sunday Morning			Face the Nation	Local and/or syndicated programming		CBS Sports and/or local programming												Local news	CBS Evening News
NBC	Fall	Local and/or syndicated programming								Meet the Press	Local and/or syndicated programming		NFL '86	NFL on NBC and local programming											
NBC	Mid-winter	Local and/or syndicated programming								Meet the Press	Local and/or syndicated programming		NBC Sports and/or local programming											Local news	NBC Nightly News

== By network ==
=== ABC ===
**Returning series**

- ABC Weekend Special
- ABC World News This Morning
- ABC World News Tonight with Peter Jennings
- All My Children
- American Bandstand
- The Bugs Bunny and Tweety Show
- Ewoks (retitled The All-New Ewoks)
- Fame, Fortune and Romance
- General Hospital
- Good Morning America
- Loving
- One Life to Live
- Ryan's Hope
- This Week with David Brinkley
- Wuzzles (reruns) (moved from CBS)

**New series**

- **Bargain Hunters**
- **The Care Bears Family**
- **Double Talk**
- **The Flintstone Kids**
- **Pound Puppies**
- **The Real Ghostbusters**
- **Webster** (reruns)
- **Who's the Boss?** (reruns)

**Canceled/Ended**

- The 13 Ghosts of Scooby-Doo
- ABC Funfit
- All-Star Blitz
- Bruce Forsyth's Hot Streak
- The Bugs Bunny/Looney Tunes Comedy Hour
- Laff-A-Lympics (reruns)
- The Littles
- New Love, American Style
- Pink Panther and Sons (reruns)
- Scooby's Mystery Funhouse
- Star Wars: Droids
- The Super Powers Team: Galactic Guardians
- Three's a Crowd (reruns)

=== CBS ===
**Returning series**

- The $25,000 Pyramid
- As the World Turns
- The Berenstain Bears
- Capitol
- Card Sharks
- CBS Evening News
- CBS Morning News
- CBS News Sunday Morning
- CBS Storybreak
- Dungeons & Dragons (reruns)
- Face the Nation
- Guiding Light
- Hulk Hogan's Rock 'n' Wrestling
- Jim Henson's Muppet Babies
- Land of the Lost (reruns)
- The Price Is Right
- The Puppy's Great Adventures (reruns)
- Richie Rich (reruns)
- The Young and the Restless

**New series**

- **The Bold and the Beautiful**
- **Galaxy High**
- **The Morning Program**
- **Pee-wee's Playhouse**
- **Teen Wolf**
- **Wildfire**

**Canceled/Ended**

- Body Language
- The Charlie Brown and Snoopy Show
- Dungeons & Dragons
- The Get Along Gang
- In the News
- Little Muppet Monsters
- Pole Position (reruns)
- Press Your Luck
- The Wuzzles (moved to ABC)

=== NBC ===
**Returning series**

- Disney's Adventures of the Gummi Bears
- Alvin and the Chipmunks
- Another World
- Blockbusters
- Days of Our Lives
- Family Ties (reruns)
- Kidd Video (reruns)
- Meet the Press
- NBC News at Sunrise
- NBC Nightly News
- It's Punky Brewster
- Sale of the Century
- Santa Barbara
- Scrabble
- Search for Tomorrow
- The Smurfs
- Super Password
- Today
- Wheel of Fortune

**New series**

- **Classic Concentration**
- **Foofur**
- **Kissyfur**
- **Lazer Tag Academy**
- **Main Street**
- **Wordplay**

**Canceled/Ended**

- Mister T
- The Snorks
- Spider-Man and His Amazing Friends (reruns)
- Your Number's Up

== See also ==
- 1986-87 United States network television schedule (prime-time)
- 1986-87 United States network television schedule (late night)

== Sources ==
- https://web.archive.org/web/20071015122215/http://curtalliaume.com/abc_day.html
- https://web.archive.org/web/20071015122235/http://curtalliaume.com/cbs_day.html
- https://web.archive.org/web/20071012211242/http://curtalliaume.com/nbc_day.html
