= Torch Song Trilogy (film) =

1988 film by Paul Bogart

- Theatrical release poster
- Directed by: Paul Bogart
- Screenplay by: Harvey Fierstein
- Based on: Torch Song Trilogy; 1982 play by Harvey Fierstein
- Produced by: Howard Gottfried
- Starring: Anne Bancroft; Matthew Broderick; Harvey Fierstein; Brian Kerwin
- Cinematography: Mikael Salomon
- Edited by: Nicholas C. Smith
- Music by: Peter Matz; Allan K. Rosen
- Distributed by: New Line Cinema
- Release dates: December 5, 1988 (Premiere); December 14, 1988
- Running time: 120 minutes
- Country: United States
- Language: English
- Budget: $1,800,000
- Box office: $4,865,997 $7,500,000 (rentals)

Torch Song Trilogy is a 1988 American comedy drama film adapted by Harvey Fierstein from his play of the same name.

The film was directed by Paul Bogart and stars Fierstein as Arnold, Anne Bancroft as Ma Beckoff, Matthew Broderick as Alan, Brian Kerwin as Ed, and Eddie Castrodad as David. Executive Producer Ronald K. Fierstein is Harvey Fierstein's brother. Scott Salmon choreographed the musical sequences in the film.

Fierstein created the role of Bertha Venation to highlight the work of female impersonator Charles Pierce. Broderick originally refused the role of Alan because he was recuperating from an automobile accident in Northern Ireland. Tate Donovan was cast, but two days into the rehearsal period Broderick had a change of heart and contacted Fierstein, who fired Donovan.

Although the play was over four hours, the film was restricted to a running time of two hours at the insistence of New Line Cinema, necessitating much editing and excisions. The time period the film covers is several years earlier than the time period of the original play.

== Plot ==
- 1971: Arnold, a New York City female impersonator, meets Ed, a bisexual schoolteacher, and they fall in love. Ed, however, is uncomfortable with his sexuality and he leaves Arnold for a girlfriend, Laurel.
- 1973–79: During Christmas, Arnold meets the love of his life, a model named Alan. They settle down together, later spending a weekend with Ed and Laurel in the country, where their relationship is tested, including by a sexual encounter between the jealous Alan and Ed, but endures. Eventually, they apply to foster a child together with a view to adoption, and their application is eventually successful. They move to bigger apartment in Brooklyn so their son can have his own room, but on their first night at their new home, Alan is killed in a homophobic attack.
- 1980: In the spring of 1980, Arnold's mother comes to visit from Florida, but her visit leads to a long-overdue confrontation. Arnold's mother disapproves of Arnold's homosexuality and his planned adoption of a gay teenage son, David, as well as Arnold's use of their family burial plot for Alan. They have a series of arguments where Arnold demands that she accept him for who he is, insisting that if she can't then she has no place in his life. The following morning, before she returns to Florida, they have a conversation where, for the first time, they seem to understand each other. With both David and Ed, who is now more mature and settled and asks Arnold to give him another chance at a romantic relationship, in his life, and a successful new career creating his own stage revue, Arnold's life is finally fulfilled. The film ends with him holding objects belonging to each of the people he loves and smiling.

== Cast ==
- Harvey Fierstein as Arnold Beckoff
- Anne Bancroft as Ma Beckoff
- Matthew Broderick as Alan Simon
- Brian Kerwin as Ed Reiss
- Karen Young as Laurel
- Eddie Castrodad as David
- Ken Page as Murray/Marcia Dimes
- Charles Pierce as Bertha Venation
- Axel Vera as Marina Del Ray
- Robert Neary as Chorus Boy
- Nick Montgomery as Chorus Boy
- Robert Lee Minor as Gregory
- Peter Mackenzie as Young Man

== Soundtrack ==
The soundtrack for Torch Song Trilogy was released on the Polydor label on LP, cassette, and CD on December 8, 1988. The album charted on the jazz charts of industry magazines Billboard and Cashbox.

The song "This Time the Dream's on Me" sung by Ella Fitzgerald, which is used several times throughout the film including over the closing credits, was excised from the planned soundtrack album by Norman Granz, Fitzgerald's long-time manager, when he invoked a contractual clause which gave Fitzgerald the right to refuse her material to appear on an album featuring another artist (known in the music industry as a "coupling clause"). In actuality, Granz was unhappy with the money offered by the record company, PolyGram Records (now part of Universal Music), for the use of the song in the film and refused permission for its inclusion on the album out of spite.

Original music by Peter Matz and contemporary pop tunes such as Rod Stewart's "Maggie May" were used in the film, but not contained on the soundtrack as its producers, Larry L. Lash and Matz, felt they broke the overall "torch song" theme of the album. The track listing is:

1. "'S Wonderful" – Count Basie Orchestra, Joe Williams
2. "Dames" – Harvey Fierstein, Nick Montgomery, Robert Neary, Ken Page, Charles Pierce, Axel Vera
3. "But Not for Me" – Billie Holiday
4. "Body and Soul" – Charlie Haden Quartet West
5. "Svelte" – Harvey Fierstein
6. "Skylark" – Marilyn Scott
7. "I Loves You, Porgy" – Bill Evans
8. "Can't We Be Friends?" – Anita O'Day
9. "Love for Sale" – Harvey Fierstein
10. "What's New?" – Billie Holiday

== Release ==
Torch Song Trilogy premiered on December 5, 1988 at Avery Fisher Hall in New York City.

=== Home media ===
Torch Song Trilogy was released on VHS in 1989, and on DVD in May 2004. The DVD version contains an audio commentary track by actor and writer Harvey Fierstein.

== Reception ==
Torch Song Trilogy was generally well received by critics, with reviews from Variety, Time Out, Roger Ebert and Janet Maslin all praising the film. It holds a 77% score on Rotten Tomatoes based on 22 reviews.

Janet Maslin from The New York Times wrote “Like La Cage aux Folles, Torch Song Trilogy presents a homosexual world that any mother, with the possible exception of Arnold Beckoff’s, would love. Greatly shortened from Mr. Fierstein’s long-running, Tony Award-winning play, the film version emphasizes the lovable at every turn, but the surprise is that it does this entertainingly and well.” Roger Ebert commented “As written and performed by Harvey Fierstein as a long-running stage hit, it was seen as a sort of nostalgic visit to the problems that gays had in the years before the horror of AIDS. The movie has more or less the same focus, but because it’s a movie, it becomes more intimate and intense.”

== Awards and honors ==
At the 1989 Deauville Film Festival, director Paul Bogart was nominated for the Critics Award and won the Audience Award. The film was also nominated for Best Feature and Fierstein was nominated for Best Male Lead at the 4th Independent Spirit Awards that same year.
