= KVST-TV =

Television station in Los Angeles (1974–1975)

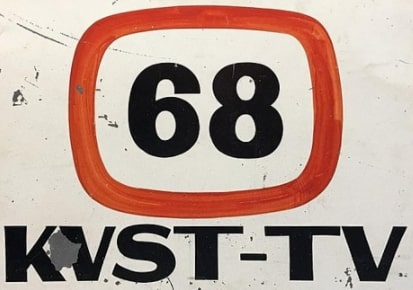
- Los Angeles, California; United States
- Channels: Analog: 68 (UHF)

Programming
- Affiliations: Public television

Ownership
- Owner: Viewer Sponsored Television Foundation

History
- First air date: May 5, 1974
- Last air date: December 23, 1975
- Call sign meaning: "Viewer Sponsored Television"

Technical information
- ERP: 1,925 kW
- HAAT: 875 m (2,870 ft)
- Transmitter coordinates: 34°13′36″N 118°03′59″W

KVST-TV (channel 68) was a non-commercial educational television station in Los Angeles, California, United States, owned by the Viewer Sponsored Television Foundation. Broadcasting from May 5, 1974, through December 23, 1975, KVST-TV was an early experiment in public-access and community television that struggled to gain enough viewer support to operate.

== History ==
Viewer Sponsored was formed in 1967 to bid on channel 58, the second non-commercial television allocation for Los Angeles. It lost to the Los Angeles Unified School District, in large part because the group had only raised 25 percent of the $528,000 need to construct and operate the channel; hearing examiner Chester F. Naumowicz found the LAUSD bid on better financial footing. (A third applicant, KCET channel 28, had previously dropped out of the running to avoid lengthy and expensive proceedings.)

However, in that proceeding, Viewer Sponsored Television asked for the allocation of channel 68 for noncommercial use in Los Angeles, which was approved by the Federal Communications Commission. Viewer Sponsored Television then was granted a construction permit for that channel in August 1972 and the call letters KVST-TV in November.

It took two years to build channel 68, during which time the Los Angeles City Council almost investigated VSTV's 26 directors for their political beliefs; a vote to do so ended in a tie. With a grant from the city council, KVST-TV finally signed on May 5, 1974. It debuted airing two hours of programming a night, four nights a week, but viewer interest from the outset was low. Channel 68 programs in the first month included a live concert by Joan Baez and many films on social change, particularly produced outside the United States.

Throughout its history, channel 68 was constantly treading financial water and experiencing staff turnover. Clayton Stouffer, who had helped build the station, was ousted in January after a spat with the board of directors and was replaced by Jerry Shaw. The station ran ads to try to attract attention to its programming and thereby increase viewer support. There were technical problems, as well: the main antenna had been installed pointing in the wrong direction, which was not discovered until the winter and delayed the award of a permanent license in lieu of a construction permit. The station operated on an annual budget of $700,000 and had a scant 250 memberships in April 1975, which jumped to 1,600 after a sponsorship drive. One producer claimed that the station sabotaged a program featuring a Black cultural center and tried to keep "positive" Black images off its air.

By the summer of 1975, channel 68 had begun producing more programming, including a weekly news analysis show; Ms. Cellany, a women's show; and a Chicano magazine program, La Raza. One of KVST-TV's notable programs included the first television appearance of the new wave rock group Oingo Boingo in 1975. Its programming was described as a groundbreaking experiment in public access television. Another innovation of KVST-TV was that it checked out portable video recorders (the only type which existed at the time was the Sony Portapak, a 1/2" reel-to-reel machine with a separate camera) to community organizations which were "on the cutting edge of social change". Members of these organizations would document their meetings and proactive solutions to various issues within the communities which they served. This material would then be edited into viewable TV programs for broadcast.

Amid continued financial difficulties and internal strife, KVST-TV signed off December 24, 1975, with the hope of signing back on in 1976. A new president and chairman of the board were elected, but Viewer Sponsored Television struggled to raise the money it needed to return to the air. It never returned. The construction permit was canceled and the call letters deleted by the FCC on February 17, 1977. Channel 68 would be used again in 1987 for KEEF-TV.
