= Charles Pierce (female impersonator) =

American female impersonator (1926–1999)

- Pierce as Baby Jane Hudson from 1987 greeting card series
- Born: July 14, 1926; Watertown, New York, U.S.
- Died: May 31, 1999 (aged 72); North Hollywood, Los Angeles, U.S.

Charles Pierce (July 14, 1926 – May 31, 1999) was one of the 20th century's foremost female impersonators, particularly noted for his impersonation of Bette Davis.

== Life and career ==
Born in Watertown, New York, he began his show business career playing the organ and acting in radio dramas at station WWNY. He branched out into a comedy routine, attired in tuxedo, yet managing to evoke eerily convincing imitations of popular movie actresses. Eschewing the term drag queen, which he hated, he billed himself as a male actress.

Initially playing in small gay clubs, his fame spread. He took up residence in San Francisco, where his act became well known to Hollywood stars. As he toured, his costuming became more elaborate, initially adding small props, later full costume and makeup changes. His imitations were imitated by other female impersonators, and his roles included Bette Davis, Mae West, Tallulah Bankhead, Gloria Swanson, Carol Channing, Katharine Hepburn, and Joan Crawford, and these roles became the drag queen canon. His act was centered on wit rather than mimicry; however, it often was said that he looked more like Joan Collins than Joan Collins herself.

Carol Channing was one of two Hollywood celebrities Pierce "impersonated" who actually saw his act. She went backstage after a show at Gold Street in San Francisco (c. 1972) and said "Cheee-yarles: you do me better than I do!" The other star was Bette Davis who was snuck into the Studio One Backlot to see his show in the late 1970s. According to Pierce's longtime stage manager and dresser Kirk Frederick in his 2016 authorized Pierce biography, Davis was unimpressed with Pierce's portrayal and refused to go backstage after the show to greet Charles, saying "There is only one female impersonator who does me right, and his name is Arthur Blake." Pierce was never told Davis had attended the show. Shortly after the incident, Pierce was introduced to Davis at a private event through Geraldine Fitzgerald, a mutual friend. Frederick reports that Davis brushed off Pierce with the same reference to Blake but didn't mention attending the show.

He performed at many clubs in New York, including The Village Gate, Ted Hook's OnStage, The Ballroom, and Freddy's Supper Club. His numerous San Francisco venues included the Gilded Cage, Cabaret/After Dark, Gold Street, Bimbo's 365 Club, Olympus, The Plush Room, the Venetian Room at the Fairmont Hotel, Louise M. Davies Symphony Hall, and the War Memorial Opera House.

He was a guest actor on an episode of TV's Wonder Woman and played a cross-dressing villain in an episode of Laverne & Shirley ("Murder on the Moose Jaw Express"). Thanks in part to his good friend actress Dixie Carter, Pierce also appeared on an early episode of the sitcom Designing Women as a steward on a cruise ship. During the episode, he imitates Joan Collins (as the ship's waitress) and Bette Davis (as the ship's lounge entertainment). As Davis, he quips: "Was that Joan Collins hustling the tables? One bitch on this boat is enough!"

He died in North Hollywood, California, aged 72, and was cremated. His memorial service at Forest Lawn Memorial Park was carefully planned and scripted by Pierce before his death. Among those attending his memorial was his friend Bea Arthur, who closed with "I’ll See You Again." His ashes were interred in the Columbarium of Providence, Forest Lawn - Hollywood Hills Cemetery in Los Angeles, California.

In Bea Arthur's Tony Award-nominated one-woman show, Just Between Friends, which she played on Broadway and in London's West End, Arthur performed "A Mother's Ingenuity", Pierce's favorite joke. It can be heard in the cast recording.

== Filmography ==
Year	Title	Episode / segment	Role	Notes
1972	The Partners	"Headlines for Higgenbottom"	Pretty Boy Clyde	TV series
1973	Love, American Style	"Love and the Baby Derby"	Johnnie	TV series
1977	Chico and the Man	"The Dress"	Brad Rushton	TV series
1977	Starsky & Hutch	"Death in a Different Place"	Show star Sugar	TV series
1978	Rabbit Test		The Queen of the United Kingdom	written and directed by Joan Rivers
1978	Wonder Woman	"Death in Disguise"	Finley / Starker	TV series
1980	Laverne & Shirley	"Murder on the Moose Jaw Express", Parts 1 and 2	MacGuffin (villain)	TV series
1982	Legends of the Silver Screen			HBO Special; live at Dorothy Chandler Pavilion
1982	Madame's Place	"A Visit from Cousin Charlie"	Charley / Bette Davis	TV series
1983	Fame	"Hail to the Chief"	Bag Lady	TV series
1987	Designing Women	"Cruising"	Claude	TV series
1988	Gay Voices, Gay Legends		Himself	documentary
1988	Torch Song Trilogy		Bertha Venation	
1989	DuckTales	"The Good Muddahs"	voices of the warden and Mr. Slinky	TV animated series
1989	Spies and Lovers		Granny Greenberg	
1990	Nerds of a Feather			
1991	The Butcher's Wife		Beau	
1997	Dragtime HBO Documentary		Himself	
2006	Stardust: The Bette Davis Story		Himself as Bette Davis	TV documentary; archive footage
2009	Queer Icon: The Cult of Bette Davis		Himself as Bette Davis	documentary; archive footage

== Discography ==
- For Pierce'd Ears (live San Francisco performance), Wanda Records MP2101
- Les Natali presents Charles Pierce. Recorded live at Bimbo's, San Francisco- Blue Thumb Records- BTS-30 -1970
