= Thom Bray =

American actor and writer

- Born: Thomas Edward Bray; Lawrenceville, New Jersey, U.S.
- Occupation: Actor
- Years active: 1980–2012

Thomas Edward Bray is a retired American actor and writer, perhaps best known for his role as Murray "Boz" Bozinsky in the detective TV series Riptide. He made his film debut in the slasher film The Prowler (1981) and later appeared in John Carpenter's Prince of Darkness (1987), and The Horror Show (1989). His work has been primarily in television, and his most recent credit was in 2012 on an episode of the TNT series Leverage. Bray was a drama teacher and also taught television studies.

== Life and career ==
Bray was born and raised in Lawrenceville, New Jersey. His first television role was in the short-lived TV series Breaking Away as Cyril. Later on in the 1980s, he starred in the TV series Harry with Alan Arkin. In 1990, he did the voice of Wilbur Finletter in the cartoon series Attack of the Killer Tomatoes: The Animated Series and voices in other animated works. His first feature film was in 1981's The Prowler. He appeared in other films: the comedy Burglar, director John Carpenter's Prince of Darkness, DeepStar Six, and The Horror Show. He appeared in the TV movie Lady Mobster.

=== Post-acting career ===
He became a writer and producer for television, including Designing Women, Now and Again, Fired Up, and Nash Bridges. He was a drama teacher at Rachel Carson Middle School and taught television studies at Portland State University. He is the father to three children.

== Filmography ==
=== Film ===
| Year | Title | Role | Notes |
|---|---|---|---|
| 1981 | The Prowler | Ben | |
| 1987 | Burglar | Shoplifter In Bookstore | |
| 1987 | Prince of Darkness | Etchison | |
| 1989 | DeepStar Six | Johnny Hodges | |
| 1989 | The Horror Show | Peter Campbell | |
| 2011 | Stripperland | Dr. Logan | |

=== Television ===
| Year | Title | Role | Notes |
|---|---|---|---|
| 1980–1981 | Breaking Away | Cyril | 8 episodes |
| 1981 | Lou Grant | Len Holland | Episode: "Hometown" |
| 1982 | Private Benjamin | Dobkins | Episode: "Not for Men Only" |
| 1982 | Remington Steele | Sheldon Quarry | Episode: "Signed, Steeled and Delivered" |
| 1982 | One Day at a Time | Hal | 4 episodes |
| 1983 | Quincy, M.E. | Joby Kenyon | Episode: "Cry for Help" |
| 1983 | Prime Times | Various | TV movie |
| 1983 | An Uncommon Love | Molson | TV movie |
| 1984 | Last of the Great Survivors | Eddie | TV movie |
| 1984 | Anatomy of an Illness | Intern | TV movie |
| 1984 | Concrete Beat | Unknown | TV movie |
| 1986 | The Love Boat | Lowell Mandell | Episode: "Second Banana / The Prodigy / What Goes Around Comes Around" |
| 1984–1986 | Riptide | Murray "Boz" Bozinsky | 56 episodes |
| 1987 | Murder, She Wrote | Dorian Beecher | Episode: "Night of the Headless Horseman" |
| 1987 | Harry | Lawrence Pendleton | 7 episodes |
| 1988 | Lady Mobster | Paul Castle | TV movie |
| 1990 | Mancuso, F.B.I. | Daryl Ross | Episode: "Daryl Ross & the Supremes" |
| 1990 | The Adventures of Don Coyote and Sancho Panda | Voices | Episode: "Pity the Poor Pirate" |
| 1990 | Child in the Night | Unknown | TV movie |
| 1990 | New Kids on the Block | Voice | 14 episodes |
| 1990 | Barnyard Commandos | Voice | |
| 1990–1991 | Attack of the Killer Tomatoes | Wilbur Finletter / Floyd Bridgework / Tomato Wilbur | 21 episodes |
| 1992 | The Legend of Prince Valiant | Voice | Episode: "The Cursed" |
| 1993 | Hearts Afire | Jerry / Norman Bates | Episode: "Trivial Pursuit" |
| 2002 | The District | EPA Agent | Episode: "Wasteland" |
| 2012 | Leverage | Bartholomew | Episode: "The Radio Job" |
