= Kentucky Woman (film) =

- Genre: Drama
- Written by: Walter Doniger
- Directed by: Walter Doniger
- Starring: Cheryl Ladd; Ned Beatty
- Theme music composer: George Romanis
- Country of origin: United States
- Original language: English

Production
- Producer: Walter Doniger
- Production locations: Martin County, Kentucky (coal mine); Paintsville, Kentucky
- Cinematography: Robert C. Jessup
- Editor: Robert Watts
- Running time: 96 min.
- Production companies: 20th Century Fox Television; CBS Entertainment Production; Walter Doniger Productions

Original release
- Network: CBS
- Release: January 11, 1983

Kentucky Woman is a 1983 American made-for-television drama film, directed by Walter Doniger, starring Cheryl Ladd, Ned Beatty and Peter Weller. It was filmed in Paintsville, Kentucky, and at a Martin County Coal Corporation (Massey Energy) coal mine in Martin County, Kentucky.

== Plot summary ==
Maggie Telford (Cheryl Ladd), a poverty-stricken waitress, faces harassment and humiliation when she goes to work as a coal miner to support her small son and ailing coal miner father disabled with black lung disease (Ned Beatty).

== Cast ==
- Cheryl Ladd as Maggie Telford
- Ned Beatty as Luke Telford
- Philip Levien as Ward Elkins
- Sandy McPeak as Roger Varney
- Tess Harper as Lorna Whateley
- Lewis Smith as Spinner Limbaugh
- Peter Weller as Deke Cullover
- Peter Hobbs as Doc James Bartholomew
- Christopher Coffey as Fred Obermeyer
- Brett Johnson as Andy Telford
- Britt Leach as Amos
- John Randolph as Reverend Palkstater
- Nancy Vawter as Aunt Minnifer
- James Carrington as Lukash
- John Chappell as Fred Humphries
