= Lewis Smith (actor) =

American actor

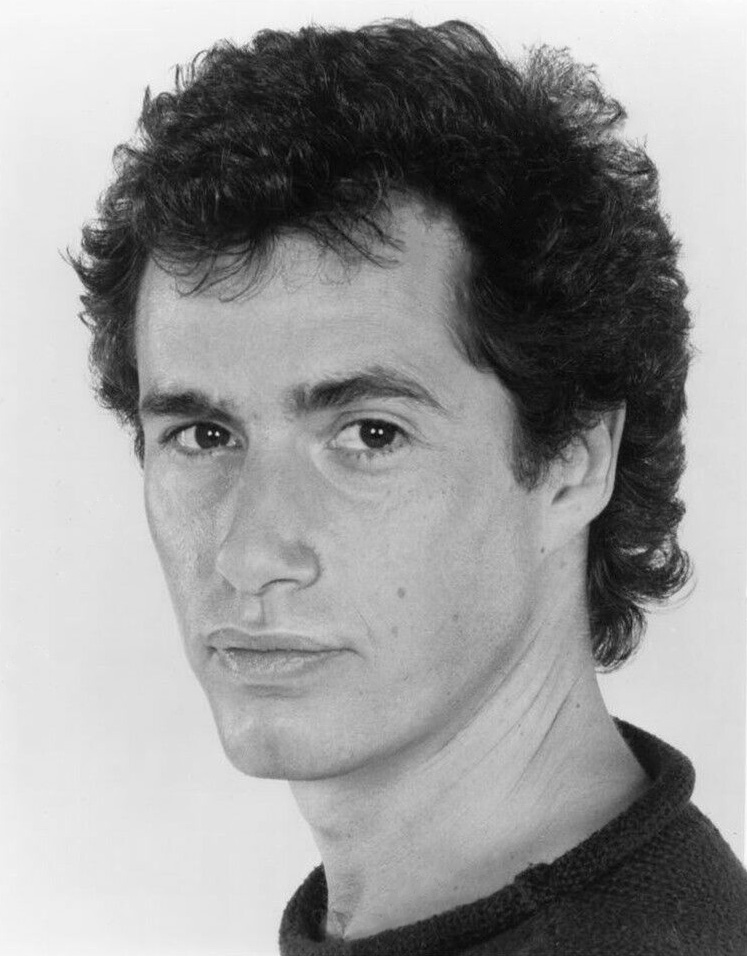
- Smith in 1987
- Born: Lewis C. Smith; August 1, 1956 (age 70); Chattanooga, Tennessee, U.S.
- Years active: 1981–present
- Website: lewissmithacademy.com

Lewis Smith (born August 1, 1956) is an American actor. He is best known as Bobby Fontana in The Heavenly Kid (1984).

== Early life ==
Lewis Smith was born on August 1, 1956 in Chattanooga, Tennessee. He graduated from Lookout Valley High School in 1974.

== Career ==
Smith is also known for the role of Charles Main on the first and second part of North and South miniseries, He also played "Curly Bill" Brocious in the Kevin Costner film Wyatt Earp. Smith co-starred as Perfect Tommy in The Adventures of Buckaroo Banzai Across the 8th Dimension and as trigger-happy National Guardsman "Earl Stuckey" in Walter Hill's Southern Comfort (1981).

He appeared in the early sequences of Love Child playing Amy Madigan's hitch-hiking boyfriend. Smith starred as Bobby Fontana in 1985's The Heavenly Kid. In 1987, he played the title role in the failed television pilot The Man Who Fell to Earth which was based on the David Bowie film from the 1970s. Smith landed a starring role in the short-lived Fox comedy television series Karen's Song. He also co-starred with Sharon Stone and Miguel Ferrer in Badlands 2005, an unsold TV pilot-movie directed by Scottish-born George T. Miller. He appeared as Jinglebells Cody, a slave fight trainer, in Quentin Tarantino's 2012 film Django Unchained.

Lewis Smith founded The Actors Academy in Los Angeles, which prepares students to work in film and television. Courses taught at Lewis Smith's Actor's Academy cover topics such as camera techniques, sound & lighting, props & marks, auditioning for roles, etc.

== Filmography ==
| Year | Title | Role | Notes |
|---|---|---|---|
| 1981 | Southern Comfort | Stuckey | |
| 1982 | I Ought to Be in Pictures | Soldier | |
| 1982 | Love Child | Jesse Chaney | |
| 1983 | Lone Star | Ranger Ben McCollum | Episode: "Pilot" |
| 1983 | Kentucky Woman | Spinner Limbaugh | TV film |
| 1983 | The Final Terror | Richard Boone | |
| 1984 | The Adventures of Buckaroo Banzai Across the 8th Dimension | Perfect Tommy | |
| 1985 | The Heavenly Kid | Bobby Fontana | |
| 1985 | North and South | Charles Main | TV miniseries |
| 1986 | North and South: Book II | Charles Main | TV miniseries |
| 1987 | Karen's Song | Steven Foreman | 13 episodes |
| 1987 | The Man Who Fell to Earth | John Dory | TV film |
| 1988 | Badlands 2005 | Marshal Garson MacBeth | TV film |
| 1989 | The Fulfillment of Mary Gray | Aaron | TV film |
| 1989–1990 | Beauty and the Beast | Mark | 4 episodes |
| 1990 | Booker | David Saxton | Episode: "Black Diamond Run" |
| 1991 | Diary of a Hitman | Zidzyck | |
| 1992 | Murder, She Wrote | Louis Paloma | Episode: "The Mole" |
| 1993 | In the Line of Duty: Ambush in Waco | Robert Williams | TV film |
| 1994 | Wyatt Earp | Curly Bill Brocius | |
| 1994 | Diagnosis: Murder | Michael Davis | Episode: "Lily" |
| 1995 | Texas Justice | Dennis Church | TV film |
| 1995 | Melrose Place | Tom Riley | 2 episodes |
| 1997 | Beyond Belief: Fact or Fiction | Steven | 2 episodes |
| 1997 | Toothless | Young Hot Guy | TV film |
| 1999 | Avalon: Beyond the Abyss | Commander Frank Stein | TV film |
| 2001 | Diagnosis: Murder | James Sloan | 2-part episodes: "Sins of the Father" |
| 2003 | Seventh Veil | | |
| 2008 | Our First Christmas | Pastor Brown | TV film |
| 2009 | CSI: Miami | Robert Banyon | Episode: "And They're Offed" |
| 2009 | Opium | Levy | Short film |
| 2012 | Django Unchained | Jinglebells Cody | |
| 2013 | The Violin | Michael Cupertino | Short film |
| 2015 | A Place in Hell | John McInnes | |
| 2016 | Misirlou | Detective Marlowe | |
| 2016 | My Buddy, the Actor | The Acting Coach | Short film |
