= Eddie Castrodad =

American actor

- Born: November 16, 1970 (age 54); United States
- Occupation: Actor

Eddie Castrodad is an American former film, television and stage actor best known for such films and television series as Torch Song Trilogy, Kate & Allie, The Cosby Show, Flanagan, Sesame Street and Dads.
