= Gung Ho (TV series) =

American sitcom

- Genre: Comedy
- Developed by: Edwin Blum
- Starring: Gedde Watanabe; Scott Bakula; Patti Yasutake; Stephen Lee; Clint Howard; Rodney Kageyama; Scott Atari; Heidi Banks; Sab Shimono
- Composer: David Michael Frank
- Country of origin: United States
- Original language: English
- No. of seasons: 1
- No. of episodes: 9

Production
- Executive producer: John Rappaport
- Running time: 30 minutes (including commercials)
- Production companies: Imagine Television; Four Way Productions; Paramount Television

Original release
- Network: ABC
- Release: December 5, 1986 – February 6, 1987

Related
- Gung Ho (film)

Gung Ho is an American sitcom based on the 1986 film of the same name. The series aired for one season on ABC from December 5, 1986, to February 6, 1987.

== Synopsis ==
Just like in the movie, the TV series follows the exploits of Hunt Stevenson (here, played by Scott Bakula as opposed to Michael Keaton in the movie), a laid-back American employee liaison of a Japanese car company (Assan Motors) in the fictional city of Hadleyville, Pennsylvania. Much of the humor arises from the abounding clashes between Hunt and the new Japanese plant manager, Kaz Kazuhiro (Gedde Watanabe, reprising his role from the movie) while looking for ways to bridge the culture gap between one another.

== Cast ==
Besides Watanabe, many of the other Japanese actors from the movie also reprised their roles for the series. Clint Howard (brother of Gung Ho movie director Ron Howard) was the only Caucasian actor from the film also to appear in the TV series.

- Scott Atari as Kenji
- Scott Bakula as Hunt Stevenson
- Heidi Banks as Randi
- Clint Howard as Googie
- Rodney Kageyama as Ito
- Stephen Lee as Buster
- Gedde Watanabe as Kaz Kazuhiro
- Patti Yasutake as Umeki Kazuhiro
- Sab Shimono as Saito
- Mary-Margaret Humes as Melissa
- Wendy Schaal As Kelly
- Kenneth Kimmins as Wacky Wally
- Emily Kuroda as Yukiko

== Episodes ==
No.	Title	Directed by	Written by	Original release date
1	"Pilot"	Jeff Chambers	Lowell Ganz & Babaloo Mandel	December 5, 1986
Hunt, acting as labor's liaison to management, tries to restore the job of a fellow worker who brashly expressed his opinion of a new employee rule book.
2	"Line of Credit"	John Bowab	Bruce Ferber & David Lerner	December 12, 1986
Hunt uses a new company credit card to entertain a date (Mary-Margaret Humes), an action that lands him back on the assembly line.
3	"Talk of the Town"	Dick Martin	Unknown	December 26, 1986
Hunt invites Kaz to a civic meeting, where Kaz's straight talk is a hit with the crowd after Hunt's ramblings strike out.
4	"Sick and Tired"	Dick Martin	Unknown	January 2, 1987
The flu puts Kaz in bed, leaving Saito in charge, just as a reporter (Earl Boen) arrives to do a story on cooperation between the Americans and the Japanese.
5	"Love Me Tender"	Art Dielhenn	Unknown	January 9, 1987
Hunt proclaims himself a one-woman man, but Kaz and Umeki have evidence that his girl friend isn't similarly inclined.
6	"Help Wanted"	John Bowab	James Berg & Stan Zimmerman	January 16, 1987
Hunt encourages Umeki to get a job selling TVs and stereos, but Kaz is outraged by the idea of his wife working.
7	"Kaz Over Easy (a.k.a. All Work And No Play...)"	Dick Martin	Bruce Ferber	January 23, 1987
When Kaz's workaholic friend from Japan dies of a heart attack, Kaz drastically alters his own work habits.
8	"Where the Boys Are"	Dick Martin & George Sunga	James Berg & Stan Zimmerman	January 30, 1987
Umeki can't contact Kaz to tell him that the prototype he plans to introduce at the auto show was totaled in transit.
9	"Brother, Can You Spare a Dollar?"	Thomas Lofaro	Unknown	February 6, 1987
A visit from Hunt's brother Eddie (Marc Poppel), a Chicago commodities broker, sparks sibling rivalry. Eddie gets Kaz and Saito to invest in a high risk investment where they end up losing money.

== See also ==
- 1986–87 United States network television schedule
