= Heart of the City (TV series) =

American crime drama television series

- Genre: Crime drama
- Created by: E. Arthur Kean; Michael Zinberg
- Written by: Jeremy Lew
- Directed by: Michael Zinberg
- Starring: Robert Desiderio; Jonathan Ward; Christina Applegate; Kario Salem; Branscombe Richmond; Robert Alan Browne; Dick Anthony Williams
- Composer: Patrick Williams
- Country of origin: United States
- Original language: English
- No. of seasons: 1
- No. of episodes: 13

Production
- Production companies: American Flyer Productions; 20th Century Fox Television

Original release
- Network: ABC
- Release: September 20, 1986 – January 10, 1987

Heart of the City is an American crime drama television series created by E. Arthur Kean and Michael Zinberg. The series was a production of American Flyer Productions in association with 20th Century Fox Television. It aired on ABC from September 20, 1986 to January 10, 1987.

== Premise ==
A police detective in a Los Angeles-styled city raises his two teenaged children after his wife's murder. His colleagues on the force chastise him for making them look bad when he solved most of their cases.

== Cast ==
- Robert Desiderio as Det. Wes Kennedy
- Christina Applegate as Robin Kennedy
- Jonathan Ward as Kevin Kennedy
- Branscombe Richmond as Sgt. Luke Halui
- Kario Salem as Det. Rick Arno
- Robert Alan Browne as Det. Stanley Bumford
- Dick Anthony Williams as Lt. Ed Van Duzer

== Episodes ==
No.	Title	Directed by	Written by	Original release date
1	"Cold Steel and Neon"	Thomas Carter	Jeremy Lew	September 20, 1986
2	"Of Dogs and Cat Burglars"	E. Arthur Kean	E. Arthur Kean	September 27, 1986
3	"When Push Comes to Shove"	Unknown	Jeremy Lew	October 4, 1986
4	"Growing Up and Grinding Down"	David Soul	Walter Brough	October 18, 1986
5	"Don't Sell Yourself to the Cannibals"	Charles Braverman (as Chuck Braverman)	William Arvin (as W.M. Whitehead)	October 25, 1986
6	"Working Without a Net"	Martin Davidson	Paul F. Edwards	November 1, 1986
7	"Cezanne, and Other Dreams"	E. Arthur Kean	E. Arthur Kean	November 8, 1986
8	"Rock and Rumble"	E. Arthur Kean	E. Arthur Kean	November 22, 1986
9	"The Chemistry of Rage"	Charles Correll	Jeremy Lew	November 29, 1986
10	"Busted"	Donald Petrie	Paul F. Edwards	December 13, 1986
11	"A Rough Ride on Life's Merry-Go-Round"	John Pasquin	David H. Balkan	December 20, 1986
12	"Beauty and a Couple of Beasts"	Unknown	E. Arthur Kean	January 3, 1987
13	"Out on a Limb"	Kevin Hooks	Walter Brough	January 10, 1987

== Broadcast and reception ==
The series debuted on ABC's Saturday-night schedule in September 1986 (9pm ET/8pm CT), following two comedies: The Ellen Burstyn Show and Life with Lucy. It was the second lowest rated show that season, airing against NBC's The Golden Girls and Amen, and also losing out to CBS's The New Mike Hammer. Heart of the City ranked 82nd out of 83 shows, with a 7.2/12 rating/share.
