= Lena Küchler-Silberman =

Jewish WWII resistance member

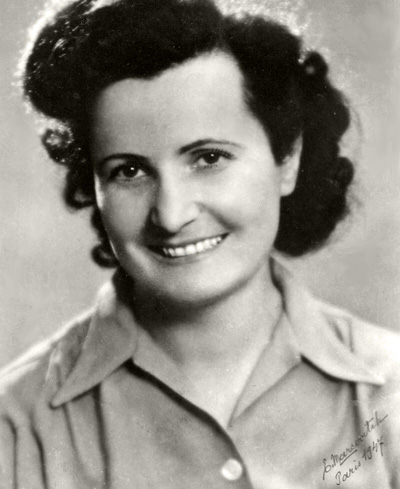
- Born: January 1910; Wieliczka, Austria-Hungary
- Died: 6 August 1987 (aged 77); Tel Aviv, Israel
- Known for: Jewish resistance during The Holocaust, care and resettlement of child Holocaust victims

Lena Küchler-Silberman (Hebrew: לנה קיכלר-זילברמן; January 1910 – 6 August 1987) was a Polish member of the Jewish resistance who saved children during The Holocaust and helped to resettle them afterwards. She is considered the most famous “surrogate mother” of child Holocaust victims.

Küchler-Silberman wrote a memoir that was published in 1959. Her story was also told in the 1987 NBC television movie, Lena: My 100 Children.

== Early life and education ==
Küchler-Silberman was raised in Wieliczka, Poland. She attended the Jewish Co-Educational Folk and Secondary School, also known as the Hebrew Gymnasium, in Kraków and later studied psychology and pedagogy at Kraków University.

Küchler-Silberman was a teacher at a Jewish elementary school in Bielsko and trained other teachers at a local college.

== The Holocaust ==
Küchler-Silberman went to Wieliczka to stay with her father at the start of World War II. Her husband, Alfred, left Kraków for Lwów. She later joined her husband in Lwów where she had their daughter, Mira.

Küchler-Silberman returned to Wieliczka after her daughter died in infancy. When Jews in the town were deported to Belzec extermination camp, she escaped to Warsaw where she hid her Jewish identity, lived under an alias, and smuggled Jewish children out of the Warsaw Ghetto. In one instance, she found a baby on top of its mother's corpse. She hid the baby under her coat and brought him to a monastery.

After her Jewish identity was discovered, she escaped to Janówek, a village in eastern Poland. She lived in the town under an alias and worked as a nanny until liberation.

== Post-war ==
Küchler-Silberman visited the Kraków offices of the Jewish Committee in the spring of 1945. While there, she encountered a number of children who were orphaned or separated from surviving relatives. She joined the committee and helped establish two group homes for Jewish children. The homes, located in Rabka and Zakopane, housed about 120 children.

The home in Rabka faced anti-semitic attacks in August 1945. The children from the Rabka home were relocated to the Zakopane home. The Zakopane home was vacated in 1946 after the children faced anti-semitic attacks from members of the nearby polish community.

Fearing escalation, Küchler-Silberman and 12 caregivers evacuated 60 children from Zakopane. Some of the other children had already settled elsewhere after locating surviving family members. The group crossed the Polish-Czech border and passed through Prague and Germany before reaching France where they stayed for eight years. Some children reunited with family members during this time and others departed for Israel on the Exodus 1947 voyage.

In April 1949, Küchler-Silberman and about 40 of the children left France for Israel. Most settled in Kvuzat Shiller and Küchler-Silberman settled in Tel Aviv.

Küchler-Silberman taught psychology and education in Tel Aviv. She maintained contact with some of the children who had been under her care.

== Publications ==
Küchler-Silberman's book, My Hundred Children, was published in 1959. She later wrote The Hundred Coming Home and My Mother’s Home.

== Personal life ==
Küchler-Silberman divorced her first husband, Alfred, before leaving Zakopane. She married Mordechai Silberman in Israel and had the couple's daughter, Shira, when she was 47 years old.

== Death and legacy ==
Küchler-Silberman died in 1987. Lena: My 100 Children, a television movie about her experience, premiered on NBC the same year.
