= KEEF-TV =

Television station in Los Angeles (1987)

- Los Angeles, California; United States
- Channels: Analog: 68 (UHF)

Programming
- Affiliations: Non-commercial independent

Ownership
- Owner: Black Television Workshop

History
- First air date: June 1, 1987
- Last air date: August 8, 1987
- Former call signs: KDDE (1987)

KEEF-TV (channel 68) was a short-lived non-commercial educational television station in Los Angeles, California, United States. It operated briefly in 1987, but was shut down after only a few months of operation and its broadcast construction permit ultimately revoked.

== History ==
=== Prior use of channel 68 in Los Angeles ===
Channel 68 was used originally by the Viewer Sponsored Television Foundation as KVST-TV, which broadcast from May 5, 1974, through December 23, 1975. It was a station with a strong community focus and aired alternative programming, much of it leftist in nature. However, it constantly struggled for viewer support and suffered through tumultuous internal politics, leading to its closure.

=== As KEEF-TV ===
On February 24, 1983, the Federal Communications Commission (FCC) authorized the Black Television Workshop to construct a non-commercial TV station on channel 68 in the Los Angeles area. The station, which was oriented to Black and Hispanic viewers, went on the air in June 1987 as KDDE. The station promised a lineup of programs by and for minority viewers—particularly Black viewers—including films from the Caribbean and Africa and British fare from Channel 4. The station changed its call sign to KEEF-TV on June 15.

Problems were very quick to come along. After Mary V. Woodfork, one of the station's board members, made a series of claims against Black Television Workshop head Booker T. Wade's conduct, the FCC ordered the station off the air on August 8, because it broadcast with a different power and antenna height from a different location from that authorized, while it investigated—an unusual move for the commission. The battle tied up the television station, a series of creditors, and a company that had paid for the KEEF-TV transmitter so it could use it to send data.

In 1989, a deal was reached to sell the station as a distress sale to Hispanic Christian Communications Network, which proposed a Spanish-language Christian station; the commission dismissed the proposal the next year because a federal appeals court had ruled that policy unconstitutional. In 1991, after the U.S. Supreme Court upheld the policy, the FCC determined that the station had not been actually built and thus would not have been eligible anyway. The construction permit was ultimately revoked by the FCC on November 19, 1992. A final review was denied by the commission in 1994.

Channel 68 was last used in Southern California by KRCA-DT, a digital simulcast of KRCA (channel 62) in Riverside, California. As of the end of the 2009 digital television transition, channel 68 was outside the authorized band for television broadcasting in the United States; at which time KRCA moved to channel 35. Since 2018, as part of the FCC's spectrum repack, KRCA has shared VHF channel 7 with KABC-TV. Plans for the digital transition did not include a digital replacement channel for the former channel 68 allocation in Los Angeles.
