= Dads (1986 TV series) =

- Created by: Lindsay Harrison
- Developed by: Jeff Harris
- Starring: Barry Bostwick; Carl Weintraub; Skye Bassett; Eddie Castrodad; Jason Nylor
- Composer: Alf Clausen
- Country of origin: United States
- Original language: English
- No. of seasons: 1
- No. of episodes: 9 (list of episodes)

Production
- Executive producers: Jeff Harris; Mark Waxman
- Camera setup: Multi-camera
- Running time: 30 minutes
- Production companies: Four for a Quarter Productions; Summa Enterprises Group; Victoria Productions; Columbia Pictures Television

Original release
- Network: ABC
- Release: December 5, 1986 – February 6, 1987

Dads is an American sitcom that aired on ABC from December 5, 1986, until February 6, 1987.

== Premise ==
Two single widowed fathers live together in a house in Philadelphia.

== Cast ==
- Barry Bostwick as Rick Armstrong
- Carl Weintraub as Louie Mangotti
- Skye Bassett as Kelly Armstrong
- Eddie Castrodad as Allan Mangiotti
- Jason Naylor as Kenny Mangiotti

== Episodes ==
No.	Title	Directed by	Written by	Original air date
1	"The Doing of The Dishes and The Cleaning of The Room"	Zane Buzby	Jeff Harris	December 5, 1986
Rick wants Kelly to do the dishes and clean her room.
2	"On Changing The Status Quo"	Zane Buzby	Mark Waxman	December 12, 1986
Rick is going on his first date since his debut.
3	"The Thing on Allan's Nose"	Zane Buzby	Unknown	December 26, 1986
Allan has a blemish on his nose on the day of his prom.
4	"Why Algebra?"	Zane Buzby	Mark Waxman	January 2, 1987
Kelly has to write an essay about algebra.
5	"The Shadow of Pompasso"	Zane Buzby	Mark Waxman	January 9, 1987
Kenny is being bullied at school.
6	"Especially Thy Father"	Zane Buzby	Mark Waxman	January 16, 1987
The dads struggle when they have to rearrange the furniture.
7	"Of Mice and Dirty Jokes"	Zane Buzby	Story by : Jeff Harris; Teleplay by : Jeff Harris & Mark Waxman	January 23, 1987
Ricky and Louie argue over profanity. Allen uses 30 mice for a science experiment.
8	"The Rivals"	Zane Buzby	Mark Waxman	January 30, 1987
When Kelly asks Louie for some advice, Rick gets jealous.
9	"Waiting"	Zane Buzby	Mark Waxman	February 6, 1987
The gang prepares for dinner at a very nice restaurant.
