= Roxie (TV series) =

1987 American sitcom TV series

- Created by: Bob Randall
- Developed by: Allan Katz
- Starring: Andrea Martin; Teresa Ganzel; Mitchell Laurance; Jerry Pavlon; Jack Riley; Ernie Sabella
- Composer: Perry Botkin
- Country of origin: United States
- Original language: English
- No. of seasons: 1
- No. of episodes: 6 (4 unaired) (list of episodes)

Production
- Camera setup: Multi-camera
- Running time: 30 minutes
- Production company: Reeves Entertainment Group

Original release
- Network: CBS
- Release: April 1 – April 8, 1987

Related
- Kate & Allie

Roxie is an American sitcom and a spin-off of Kate & Allie (in which the main character appeared, albeit with a different name) that aired for two episodes on April 1, 1987, and April 8, 1987 on CBS. It was the lead-in to the sitcom Take Five, which also only lasted for two episodes.

== Premise ==
Andrea Martin played a TV programmer for WNYV, channel 66, a UHF television station in New York City.

== Cast ==
- Andrea Martin as Roxie Brinkerhoff
- Teresa Ganzel as Marcie McKinley
- Mitchell Laurance as Michael Brinkerhoff
- Jerry Pavlon as Randy Grant
- Jack Riley as Leon Buchanan
- Ernie Sabella as Vito Carteri

== Episodes ==
| No. | Title | Directed by | Written by | Original release date |
|---|---|---|---|---|
| 1 | "You're a Big Girl Now" | Unknown | Allan Katz | April 1, 1987 |
Roxie reunites with a friend she hasn't seen in 15 years.
| 2 | "Dog Days" | Unknown | Unknown | April 8, 1987 |
Roxie announces on-air that her elderly neighbor has lost a dog.
| 3 | "Group Therapy" | N/A | N/A | Unaired |
The whole station has an on-camera therapy session.
| 4 | "Here's Roxie" | N/A | N/A | Unaired |
| 5 | "It's Not Easy Being Green" | N/A | N/A | Unaired |
| 6 | "Professional Courtesy" | N/A | N/A | Unaired |
