= Take Five (TV series) =

1987 American sitcom TV series

- Created by: Lowell Ganz; Babaloo Mandel
- Starring: George Segal; Derek McGrath; Bruce Jarchow; Jim Haynie; Melanie Chartoff; Todd Field; Severn Darden
- Country of origin: United States
- Original language: English
- No. of seasons: 1
- No. of episodes: 6 (4 unaired)

Production
- Producers: David Misch; Todd Stevens
- Camera setup: Multi-camera
- Running time: 30 minutes
- Production companies: Imagine Television; Empire City Presentations; Tri-Star Television

Original release
- Network: CBS
- Release: April 1 – April 8, 1987

Take Five is an American sitcom that was produced by Imagine Television, Empire City Presentations, and Tri-Star Television that aired on CBS from April 1 to April 8, 1987. Six episodes were made, but only two were aired. Its lead-in was the sitcom Roxie, which also lasted for only two episodes.

== Premise ==
PR man Andy Kooper has a midlife crisis and dumps his wife, for which her father drops him from the payroll.

== Cast ==
=== Main ===
- George Segal as Andy Kooper
- Derek McGrath as Al
- Bruce Jarchow as Monty
- Jim Haynie as Lenny Goodman
- Melanie Chartoff as Laraine McDermott
- Todd Field as Kevin Davis
- Severn Darden as Dr. Noah Wolf

=== Recurring ===
- Eugene Roche as Max Davis

== Episodes ==
No.	Title	Directed by	Written by	Original release date
1	"Kooper with a K"	Barnet Kellman	Babaloo Mandel & Lowell Ganz	April 1, 1987
2	"The Return of Marty"	Barnet Kellman	David Misch	April 8, 1987
3	"The Boss is Back"	Michael Lessac	Lowell Ganz	Unaired
4	"George's Dream Girl"	Michael Lessac	Lowell Ganz	Unaired
5	"My Friend, Dad"	Michael Lessac	Lowell Ganz	Unaired
6	"Men who Hate Men who Hate Women"	Michael Lessac	Lowell Ganz	Unaired
