= Karen's Song =

- Genre: Sitcom
- Created by: Linda Marsh; Margie Peters
- Starring: Patty Duke; Lewis Smith; Teri Hatcher; Lainie Kazan
- Composer: Doug Timm
- Country of origin: United States
- Original language: English
- No. of seasons: 1
- No. of episodes: 13 (4 unaired)

Production
- Running time: 30 minutes
- Production company: MGM/UA Television

Original release
- Network: Fox
- Release: July 18 – September 12, 1987

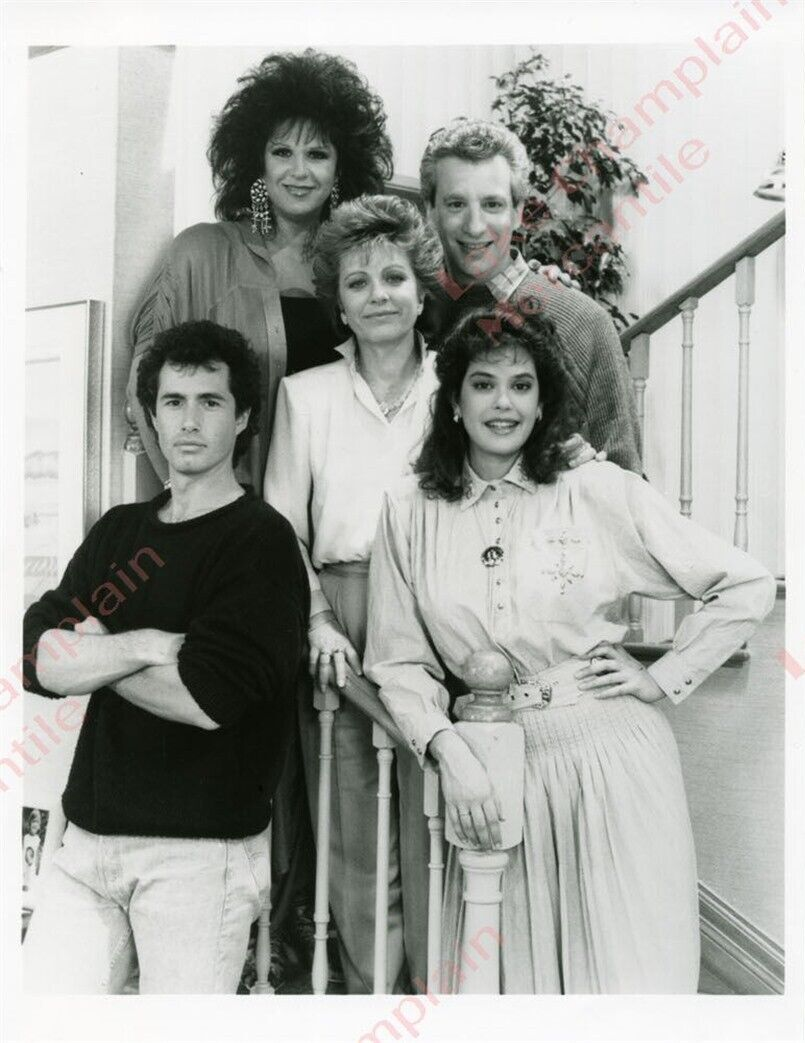
Cast of Karen's Song

Karen's Song is an American sitcom starring Patty Duke that aired on Fox from July 18 to September 12, 1987.

== Plot ==
Forty-year-old divorcee Karen Matthews (Patty Duke) cautiously begins dating 28-year-old Steven Foreman (Lewis Smith). Her daughter Laura (Teri Hatcher) is also a bit apprehensive about her mother's new relationship; however, Karen's friend Claire (Lainie Kazan) encourages her to continue dating the younger man.

== Cast ==
- Patty Duke as publishing executive Karen Matthews
- Lewis Smith as caterer Steven Foreman
- Teri Hatcher as college student Laura Matthews
- Lainie Kazan as Claire Steiner

== Episodes ==
No.	Title	Directed by	Written by	Original release date	Prod. code
1	"Take Me Out to the Ballgame"	Allan Smithee	Linda Marsh & Margie Peters	July 18, 1987	7001
2	"Tonight's the Night"	J. D. Lobue	Unknown	July 25, 1987	7002
3	"Happy Birthday"	Asaad Kelada	Unknown	August 1, 1987	7003
4	"High Noon"	Unknown	Unknown	August 8, 1987	7004
5	"Do You Want to Know a Secret?"	Asaad Kelada	Unknown	August 15, 1987	7005
6	"You've Got a Friend"	Asaad Kelada	Unknown	August 22, 1987	7006
7	"Don't Fence Me In"	Bonnie Franklin	Unknown	August 29, 1987	7007
8	"My Boy Bill"	Valentine Mayer	Unknown	September 5, 1987	7008
9	"Aloha Oe"	Jack Shea	Unknown	September 12, 1987	7009
10	"Heart Attack (part 1)"	N/A	N/A	Unaired	7010
11	"Seems Like Old Times (part 2)"	Peter Baldwin	N/A	Unaired	7011
12	"Take This Job and Shove It"	Peter Baldwin	N/A	Unaired	7012
13	"It Was Fascination"	Bonnie Franklin	N/A	Unaired	7013

== Reception ==
Noel Holston of the Star Tribune said the series is "predictable fare, blandly written and inconsistently cast".
