= Nothing in Common (TV series) =

- Genre: Sitcom
- Based on: Nothing in Common by Rick Podell & Michael Preminger
- Developed by: Garry Marshall
- Starring: Bill Macy; Todd Waring; Wendy Kilbourne
- Composer: Jimmy Dunne
- Country of origin: United States
- Original language: English
- No. of seasons: 1
- No. of episodes: 7

Production
- Producers: Garry Marshall; Alexandra Rose
- Running time: 30 minutes
- Production companies: Rastar Productions; Tri-Star Television

Original release
- Network: NBC
- Release: April 2 – June 3, 1987

Related
- Nothing in Common (1986 film)

Nothing in Common is an American sitcom television series which aired on NBC from April 2 to June 3, 1987. Based on the 1986 film of the same name directed by Garry Marshall and starring Tom Hanks and Jackie Gleason, the series starred Todd Waring as David Basner and Bill Macy as David's father Max Basner. Seven episodes were broadcast immediately after the highly-rated series Cheers, but failed to retain the strong audience of that series and was cancelled after only seven episodes had aired.

== Cast ==
- Todd Waring as David Basner
- Bill Macy as Max Basner
- Mona Lyden as Norma Starr
- Bill Applebaum as Mark Glick
- Wendy Kilbourne as Jacqueline North
- Elizabeth Bennett as Victoria Upton-Smythe
- Patrick Richwood as Myron Nipper
- Billy Wirth as Joey D.

== Episodes ==
No.	Title	Directed by	Written by	Original release date
1	"Dad for Hire"	Nick Abdo	Samuro Mitzubi	April 2, 1987
2	"Kissunderstanding"	Unknown	Unknown	April 9, 1987
3	"Gone Fishing"	Unknown	Unknown	April 16, 1987
4	"Peter Pan Principle"	Unknown	Unknown	April 23, 1987
5	"Best Friends"	Unknown	Unknown	April 30, 1987
6	"A Smile and a Shoeshine"	Unknown	Unknown	May 6, 1987
7	"Birthday, She Wrote"	Unknown	Unknown	June 3, 1987
