= Sweet Surrender (TV series) =

American television sitcom 1987

- Genre: Sitcom
- Created by: Deidre Fay; Stuart Wolpert
- Starring: Mark Blum; Dana Delany
- Composer: Ray Colcord
- Country of origin: United States
- Original language: English
- No. of seasons: 1
- No. of episodes: 6

Production
- Executive producers: Deidre Fay; Stuart Wolpert
- Running time: 30 minutes
- Production companies: Dahn Tahn Productions; Embassy Communications

Original release
- Network: NBC
- Release: April 18 – July 8, 1987

Sweet Surrender is an American sitcom television series created by Deidre Fay and Stuart Wolpert that aired on NBC from April 18 to July 8, 1987. The series starred Dana Delany as Georgia Holden, a career woman who gives up her job to become a stay-at-home mother to her two children, and Mark Blum as her husband Ken."Sweet Surrender". TV Guide. The supporting cast included David Doyle, Viveka Davis, and Edan Gross. Produced by Embassy Communications, the series ran for six episodes and was one of Delany's first leading television roles, preceding her breakthrough performance on China Beach the following year.Riggs, Thomas. "Delany, Dana 1956--". Contemporary Theatre, Film and Television. Gale – via Encyclopedia.com.

== Cast ==
- Mark Blum as Ken Holden
- Dana Delany as Georgia Holden
- Viveka Davis as Cak
- David Doyle as Frank Macklin
- Edan Gross as Bart Holden
- Marjorie Lord as Joyce Holden
- Louise Williams as Lyla Gafney

== Episodes ==
No.	Title	Directed by	Written by	Original release date
1	"The Big Seven"	John Bowab	Deidre Fay & Stuart Wolpert	April 18, 1987
2	"Where There's a Will..."	Valentine Mayer	Burt Prelutsky	April 25, 1987
3	"The Holdens Go to Dinner"	Jack Shea	Bob Garfield	May 2, 1987
4	"High School Confidential"	Linda Day	Unknown	May 9, 1987
5	"I Got Those No Dough, No Justice, Crazy Dog Blues"	John Bowab	Unknown	May 16, 1987
6	"Sexual Diversity in Philadelphia"	John Bowab	Stephen Neigher	July 8, 1987
