= 1986–87 United States network television schedule (late night) =

These are the late night schedules on all four networks beginning September 1986. All times are Eastern/Pacific.

PBS is not included, as member television stations have local flexibility over most of their schedules and broadcast times for network shows may vary, CBS, ABC and Fox are not included on the weekend schedules (as the networks do not offer late night programs of any kind on weekends).

Talk/variety shows are highlighted in yellow, network news programs in gold, and local news & programs are highlighted in white background.

== Monday-Friday ==
-		11:00 PM	11:30 PM	12:00 AM	12:30 AM	1:00 AM	1:30 AM	2:00 AM	2:30 AM	3:00 AM	3:30 AM	4:00 AM	4:30 AM	5:00 AM	5:30 AM
ABC	Fall	local programming	ABC News Nightline	The Dick Cavett Show (Tue.-Wed.)/Jimmy Breslin's People (Thur.-Fri.)		Local or sign off
ABC	Winter	local programming	ABC News Nightline	Local or sign off
ABC	June	local programming	ABC News Nightline	Monday Sportsnite (Mon.)		Local or sign off
CBS	Fall	local programming	CBS Late Night				local programming or sign off	CBS News Nightwatch
CBS	Winter	local programming	CBS Late Night (Mon.-Thur.)/Keep on Cruisin' (Fri., 11:30-12:40)				local programming or sign off	CBS News Nightwatch
CBS	Summer	local programming	CBS Late Night (Mon.-Thur.)/In Person from the Palace (Fri., 11:30-12:40)				local programming or sign off	CBS News Nightwatch
NBC	Fall	local programming	The Tonight Show Starring Johnny Carson		Late Night with David Letterman (Mon.-Thur.)/Friday Night Videos to 2:00 (Fri)		local programming or sign off
NBC	Summer	local programming	The Tonight Show Starring Johnny Carson		Late Night with David Letterman		Friday Night Videos (Fri.)		local programming or sign off
Fox (launched October 9, 1986)	Fall	The Late Show Starring Joan Rivers		local programming or sign off
Fox (launched October 9, 1986)	May	The Late Show		local programming or sign off

== Saturday ==
-	11:00 PM	11:30 PM	12:00 AM	12:30 AM	1:00 AM	1:30 AM	2:00 AM	2:30 AM	3:00 AM	3:30 AM	4:00 AM	4:30 AM	5:00 AM	5:30 AM
NBC	local programming	Saturday Night Live			local programming or sign off

== Sunday ==
-	11:00 PM	11:30 PM	12:00 AM	12:30 AM	1:00 AM	1:30 AM	2:00 AM	2:30 AM	3:00 AM	3:30 AM	4:00 AM	4:30 AM	5:00 AM	5:30 AM
NBC	local programming	The George Michael Sports Machine	local programming or sign off

== By network ==
=== ABC ===
Returning Series

- Nightline

New Series

- The Dick Cavett Show
- Jimmy Breslin's People

Not Returning From 1985-86

- Eye on Hollywood
- Lifestyles of the Rich and Famous

=== CBS ===
Returning Series

- CBS Late Night
- CBS News Nightwatch

New Series

- In Person from the Palace
- Keep on Cruisin'

=== Fox ===
New Series

- The Late Show

=== NBC ===
Returning Series

- Friday Night Videos
- The George Michael Sports Machine
- Late Night with David Letterman
- Saturday Night Live
- The Tonight Show Starring Johnny Carson
