= Harry (American TV series) =

American sitcom

- Genre: Sitcom
- Created by: Susan Kramer
- Developed by: Gary Jacobs
- Starring: Alan Arkin; Holland Taylor; Thom Bray; Matt Craven; Barbara Dana; Kurt Knudson; Richard Lewis
- Composer: Alf Clausen
- Country of origin: United States
- Original language: English
- No. of seasons: 1
- No. of episodes: 7 (3 unaired)

Production
- Executive producers: Barry Levinson; Mark Johnson
- Producers: Don Van Atta; Shelley Zellman; Alan Arkin
- Running time: 22 minutes
- Production company: Touchstone Television

Original release
- Network: ABC
- Release: March 4 – March 25, 1987

Harry is an American sitcom television series created by Susan Kramer. The series stars Alan Arkin, Thom Bray, Matt Craven, Barbara Dana, Kurt Knudson, Richard Lewis and Holland Taylor. The series aired on ABC from March 4 to March 25, 1987.

== Cast ==
- Alan Arkin as Harry Porschak
- Holland Taylor as Ina Duckett
- Thom Bray as Lawrence Pendelton
- Matt Craven as Bobby Kratz
- Barbara Dana as Dr. Sandy Clifton
- Kurt Knudson as Wyatt Lockhart
- Richard Lewis as Richard Breskin

== Episodes ==
No.	Title	Directed by	Written by	Original release date
1	"Meet Mr. Porschak"	Steve Robman	S : Ken Finkleman; S/T : Gary Jacobs	March 4, 1987
2	"How Do You Solve a Problem Like Nurse Duckett?"	Bill Foster	Rich Orloff	March 11, 1987
3	"This Is the Army, Mr. Porschak"	Steve Robman	Gary Jacobs	March 18, 1987
4	"The Great Rat Race"	Linda Day	Alan Mandel	March 25, 1987
5	"Rebel with Sort of a Cause"	TBD	TBD	N/A
6	"Harry's Big Night"	TBD	TBD	N/A
7	"Mr. Imperfect"	TBD	TBD	N/A
