= The Ellen Burstyn Show =

- Genre: Sitcom
- Created by: Norman Steinberg; David Frankel
- Written by: Robert Bruce; Howard Gewirtz; Bob Rosenfarb; Norman Steinberg; Martin Weiss
- Directed by: Norman Steinberg; Dolores Ferraro; Sam Weisman
- Starring: Ellen Burstyn; Elaine Stritch; Megan Mullally; Barry Sobel; Jesse Tendler
- Opening theme: "Nothing in the World Like Love" performed by Rita Coolidge
- Composer: Artie Butler
- Country of origin: United States
- Original language: English
- No. of seasons: 1
- No. of episodes: 13 (1 unaired)

Production
- Executive producer: Norman Steinberg
- Producers: David Frankel; Ronald E. Frazier
- Cinematography: George Spiro Dibie
- Editors: Andy Ackerman; Jimmy B. Frazier
- Camera setup: Multi-camera
- Running time: 30 minutes
- Production companies: Ellen Burstyn Productions; P.S. 235 Productions; Touchstone Television

Original release
- Network: ABC
- Release: September 20, 1986 – September 5, 1987

The Ellen Burstyn Show is an American sitcom starring Ellen Burstyn. The series was produced by Touchstone Television and debuted on ABC on September 20, 1986. The series was canceled after 13 episodes.

== Synopsis ==
Burstyn played Baltimore college professor Ellen Brewer, who sometimes had to deal not only with the students she has to tutor, but also with her meddling mother, Sydney (played by fellow veteran Broadway/film actress Elaine Stritch, who was only 7 years older than Burstyn), her divorced daughter, Molly (Megan Mullally) and her 5 1/2 year old grandson, Nick (played by Jesse Tendler).

== Cast ==
- Ellen Burstyn as Ellen Brewer
- Megan Mullally as Molly Brewer Ross
- Elaine Stritch as Sydney Brewer
- Barry Sobel as Tom Hines
- Jesse Tendler as Nick Ross
- Timothy Biggins as Mike Brewer

== Cancellation ==
The series debuted on September 20, 1986, and ran until November 15, 1986. It was cancelled after eight episodes but returned in August of 1987 to burn off the remaining five episodes. The final episode aired on September 5, 1987, ranking as the third-lowest-rated series on network television (81st out of 83 shows, with a 7.6/13 rating/share).

== Episodes ==
| No. | Title | Directed by | Written by | Original release date |
|---|---|---|---|---|
| 1 | "Pilot" | Norman Steinberg | Story by : Norman Steinberg & David Frankel; Teleplay by : David Frankel | September 20, 1986 |
| 2 | "Monkey Business" | Dolores Ferraro | David Frankel | September 27, 1986 |
| 3 | "Where There's a Will" | Unknown | Unknown | October 4, 1986 |
| 4 | "The Guest Lecturer" | Dolores Ferraro | Pamela Norris | October 18, 1986 |
| 5 | "Crime and Punishment" | Unknown | Unknown | October 25, 1986 |
| 6 | "Sydney's Night Out" | Unknown | Unknown | November 1, 1986 |
| 7 | "Reading Between the Lines" | Sam Weisman | Cheryl Gard | November 8, 1986 |
| 8 | "Family Affair" | Norman Steinberg | Bob Rosenfarb | November 15, 1986 |
| 9 | "Molly Sings the Blues" | Unknown | Unknown | August 8, 1987 |
| 10 | "Writer, Wronger" | Unknown | Unknown | August 15, 1987 |
| 11 | "The Box" | Unknown | Unknown | August 22, 1987 |
| 12 | "Writes of Passage" | Unknown | Unknown | September 5, 1987 |
| 13 | "I'm Dancing Faster Than I Can" | TBD | TBD | UNAIRED |
