= 1988–89 United States network television schedule =

The 1988–89 network television schedule for the four major English language commercial broadcast networks in the United States covers primetime hours from September 1988 through August 1989. The schedule is followed by a list per network of returning series, new series, and series cancelled after the 1987–88 season.

PBS is not included; member stations have local flexibility over most of their schedules and broadcast times for network shows may vary.

New series are highlighted in bold.

All times are U.S. Eastern Time and Pacific Time (except for some live sports or events). Subtract one hour for Central, Mountain, Alaska and Hawaii–Aleutian times.

Each of the 30 highest-rated shows is listed with its rank and rating as determined by Nielsen Media Research.

== Writers' strike impact ==
The 1988 Writers Guild of America strike lasted between March 7 and August 7. During the strike, production on scripted television series across all of the major television networks was suspended. The writers' strike forced the networks to postpone the start of the fall 1988 schedule later than usual; rather than the traditional late-September/early-October start, new and returning series had their premieres delayed until late October and into November. In the interim, the networks had to rely on a hodgepodge of programming, including reruns, films, entertainment and news specials, program-length political advertising, and unscripted original series (e.g. CBS' High Risk); NBC and ABC also benefited from sports programming (NBC relied on the Summer Olympics in September and the World Series in October, while ABC had postseason baseball coverage and moved up the start time for the early weeks of Monday Night Football from 9 p.m. ET to 8 p.m. ET to replace MacGyver, which was not yet ready with new episodes at the time). Even though previous strikes of Hollywood employees occurred in 1980 and 1981, those strikes only had a minor effect on the production of television programs that aired in the 1980–81 and 1981–82 seasons. The 1988–89 television season was thus the first of four television seasons to have its start delayed due to issues outside of the control of the major networks; further instances occurred in the 2001–02 season (due to the networks' news coverage of the September 11 attacks), the 2020–21 season (due to the suspension of television productions as a result of the COVID-19 pandemic), and the 2023–24 season (due to the 2023 Hollywood labor disputes).

== Legend ==
- Light blue indicates local programming.
- Gray indicates encore programming.
- Blue-gray indicates news programming.
- Light green indicates sporting events.
- Red indicates series being burned off and other irregularly scheduled programs, including specials and movies.
- highlight Yellow highlights indicates the top-10 most watched programs of the season.
- highlight Cyan highlights indicates numbers 11-20 most watched programs of the season.
- highlight Magenta highlights indicates numbers 21-30 most watched programs of the season.
- highlight Highlights indicates that it falls in multiple of the above categories.

== Sunday ==
Network		7:00 p.m.	7:30 p.m.	8:00 p.m.	8:30 p.m.	9:00 p.m.	9:30 p.m.	10:00 p.m.	10:30 p.m.
ABC	Fall	**Incredible Sunday**		**Mission: Impossible**		The ABC Sunday Night Movie			
ABC	Winter	**Great Circuses of the World**		Special programming		The ABC Sunday Night Movie			
ABC	Spring	**Incredible Sunday**		Moonlighting		The ABC Sunday Night Movie			
ABC	Summer	**Incredible Sunday**		**Have Faith** (R)	The ABC Sunday Night Movie				
ABC	Late summer	**Incredible Sunday**		MacGyver (R)		The ABC Sunday Night Movie			
CBS		60 Minutes (5/21.9)		Murder, She Wrote (8/19.9)		CBS Sunday Movie (27/16.1) (Tied with Knots Landing)			
Fox	Fall	21 Jump Street		America's Most Wanted	Married... with Children	It's Garry Shandling's Show (R)	The Tracey Ullman Show	Duet	Local programming
Fox	Winter	21 Jump Street		America's Most Wanted	Married... with Children	It's Garry Shandling's Show (R)	The Tracey Ullman Show	Duet	Local programming
Fox	Spring	21 Jump Street		America's Most Wanted	Married... with Children	It's Garry Shandling's Show (R)	The Tracey Ullman Show	Duet	Local programming
Fox	Summer	21 Jump Street		America's Most Wanted	**Totally Hidden Video**	Married... with Children (R)	It's Garry Shandling's Show (R)	The Tracey Ullman Show (R)	Duet (R)
NBC	Fall	**The Magical World of Disney**		Family Ties	Day by Day	NBC Sunday Night Movie (22/16.3) (Tied with The Hogan Family and The Wonder Years)			
NBC	Winter	**The Magical World of Disney**		Family Ties	Day by Day	NBC Sunday Night Movie (22/16.3) (Tied with The Hogan Family and The Wonder Years)			
NBC	Spring	**The Magical World of Disney**		Family Ties	Day by Day	NBC Sunday Night Movie (22/16.3) (Tied with The Hogan Family and The Wonder Years)			
NBC	Summer	**The Jim Henson Hour**		**The Magical World of Disney**		NBC Sunday Night Movie (22/16.3) (Tied with The Hogan Family and The Wonder Years)			
NBC	Late summer	**The Magical World of Disney**		Family Ties (R)	My Two Dads (R)	NBC Sunday Night Movie (22/16.3) (Tied with The Hogan Family and The Wonder Years)			

Notes:

- **Quantum Leap** had a two-hour premiere Sunday, March 26, 1989, on NBC.
- On ABC, **A Fine Romance** was supposed to air 8-9 p.m., but production delays amidst the strike forced the move to Thursdays.

== Monday ==
Network		8:00 p.m.	8:30 p.m.	9:00 p.m.	9:30 p.m.	10:00 p.m.	10:30 p.m.
ABC	Fall	Monday Night Football (15/17.5) (Tied with ALF)					
ABC	Mid-fall	MacGyver		Monday Night Football (15/17.5) (Tied with ALF)			
ABC	Winter	MacGyver		The ABC Monday Night Movie			
ABC	Mid-winter	MacGyver		**The ABC Monday Mystery Movie*** (29/15.4) (Tied with Dallas)			
ABC	Spring	MacGyver		**The ABC Monday Mystery Movie*** (29/15.4) (Tied with Dallas)			
ABC	Summer	MacGyver		**The ABC Monday Mystery Movie*** (29/15.4) (Tied with Dallas)			
CBS	Fall	Newhart	The Cavanaughs	CBS Monday Night Movie			
CBS	Mid-fall	Newhart	Coming of Age	**Murphy Brown**	Designing Women	Special programming	
CBS	Winter	Newhart	Kate & Allie	**Murphy Brown**	Designing Women	**Almost Grown**	
CBS	Spring	**Live-In**	**Heartland**	**Murphy Brown**	Designing Women	Newhart	Kate & Allie
CBS	Summer	Kate & Allie (R)	**Heartland**	**Murphy Brown**	Designing Women	Newhart	**Doctor Doctor**
CBS	Mid-summer	Kate & Allie (R)	Designing Women (R)	**Murphy Brown**	Designing Women	**Murphy Brown** (R)	Newhart (R)
NBC	Fall	ALF (15/17.5) (Tied with Monday Night Football)	The Hogan Family (22/16.3) (Tied with the NBC Sunday Night Movie and The Wonder Years)	NBC Monday Night at the Movies (25/16.2) (Tied with Amen)			
NBC	Winter	ALF (15/17.5) (Tied with Monday Night Football)	The Hogan Family (22/16.3) (Tied with the NBC Sunday Night Movie and The Wonder Years)	NBC Monday Night at the Movies (25/16.2) (Tied with Amen)			
NBC	Spring	ALF (15/17.5) (Tied with Monday Night Football)	**Nearly Departed**	NBC Monday Night at the Movies (25/16.2) (Tied with Amen)			
NBC	Mid-spring	ALF (15/17.5) (Tied with Monday Night Football)	The Hogan Family (22/16.3) (Tied with the NBC Sunday Night Movie and The Wonder Years)	NBC Monday Night at the Movies (25/16.2) (Tied with Amen)			
NBC	Summer	ALF (15/17.5) (Tied with Monday Night Football)	The Hogan Family (22/16.3) (Tied with the NBC Sunday Night Movie and The Wonder Years)	NBC Monday Night at the Movies (25/16.2) (Tied with Amen)			

(*) B.L. Stryker, Columbo, Gideon Oliver

== Tuesday ==
Network		8:00 p.m.	8:30 p.m.	9:00 p.m.	9:30 p.m.	10:00 p.m.	10:30 p.m.
ABC	Fall	Who's the Boss? (7/20.8)	**Roseanne** (2/23.8)	Special programming			
ABC	Late fall	Who's the Boss? (7/20.8)	**Roseanne** (2/23.8)	Moonlighting		Thirtysomething	
ABC	Winter	Who's the Boss? (7/20.8)	**Roseanne** (2/23.8)	Moonlighting		Thirtysomething	
ABC	Late winter	Who's the Boss? (7/20.8)	The Wonder Years (22/16.3) (Tied with The Hogan Family and the NBC Sunday Night Movie)	**Roseanne** (2/23.8)	**Anything but Love** (10/19.0)	Thirtysomething	
ABC	Spring	Who's the Boss? (7/20.8)	The Wonder Years (22/16.3) (Tied with The Hogan Family and the NBC Sunday Night Movie)	**Roseanne** (2/23.8)	**Have Faith**	Thirtysomething	
ABC	Summer	Who's the Boss? (7/20.8)	The Wonder Years (22/16.3) (Tied with The Hogan Family and the NBC Sunday Night Movie)	**Roseanne** (2/23.8)	**Coach** (R)	Thirtysomething	
CBS	Fall	**High Risk**		CBS Tuesday Movie			
CBS	Late fall	**TV 101**		CBS Tuesday Movie			
CBS	Winter	Tour of Duty		CBS Tuesday Movie			
CBS	Spring	Tour of Duty		CBS Tuesday Movie			
CBS	Summer	CBS Summer Playhouse		CBS Tuesday Movie			
NBC	Fall	Matlock (13/17.7)		NBC Tuesday Night at the Movies			
NBC	Mid-fall	Matlock (13/17.7)		In the Heat of the Night (18/17.3)		**Midnight Caller**	
NBC	Winter	Matlock (13/17.7)		In the Heat of the Night (18/17.3)		**Midnight Caller**	
NBC	Spring	Matlock (13/17.7)		In the Heat of the Night (18/17.3)		**Midnight Caller**	
NBC	Summer	Matlock (13/17.7)		In the Heat of the Night (18/17.3)		**Midnight Caller**	

== Wednesday ==
Network		8:00 p.m.	8:30 p.m.	9:00 p.m.	9:30 p.m.	10:00 p.m.	10:30 p.m.
ABC	Fall	Growing Pains (13/17.6) (Tied with L.A. Law)	Head of the Class (20/17.1)	The ABC Wednesday Night Movie			
ABC	Late Fall	Growing Pains (13/17.6) (Tied with L.A. Law)	Head of the Class (20/17.1)	The Wonder Years (22/16.3) (Tied with The Hogan Family and the NBC Sunday Night Movie)	Hooperman	China Beach	
ABC	Late Winter	Growing Pains (13/17.6) (Tied with L.A. Law)	Head of the Class (20/17.1)	**Coach**	Hooperman	China Beach	
ABC	Spring	Growing Pains (13/17.6) (Tied with L.A. Law)	Head of the Class (20/17.1)	**Coach**	**The Robert Guillaume Show**	China Beach	
ABC	Summer	Growing Pains (13/17.6) (Tied with L.A. Law)	Head of the Class (20/17.1)	Hooperman	**The Robert Guillaume Show**	China Beach	
ABC	Late summer	Growing Pains (13/17.6) (Tied with L.A. Law)	Head of the Class (20/17.1)	Hooperman	**Coach**	China Beach	
CBS	Early fall	**Live! Dick Clark Presents**		The Equalizer		Wiseguy	
CBS	Fall	**The Van Dyke Show**	**Annie McGuire**	The Equalizer		Wiseguy	
CBS	Winter	**TV 101**		The Equalizer		Wiseguy	
CBS	Mid-winter	**Hard Time on Planet Earth**		Jake and the Fatman		Wiseguy	
CBS	Spring	**Hard Time on Planet Earth**		Jake and the Fatman		Wiseguy	
CBS	Summer	**Hard Time on Planet Earth**		Jake and the Fatman		Wiseguy	
CBS	Late summer	**The Smothers Brothers Comedy Hour**		Jake and the Fatman		Wiseguy	
NBC	Fall	**Unsolved Mysteries** (17/17.4)		Night Court (21/16.9)	**Baby Boom**	**Tattingers**	
NBC	Mid-fall	**Unsolved Mysteries** (17/17.4)		Night Court (21/16.9)	My Two Dads	**Tattingers**	
NBC	Winter	**Unsolved Mysteries** (17/17.4)		Night Court (21/16.9)	My Two Dads	**Nightingales**	
NBC	Spring	**Unsolved Mysteries** (17/17.4)		Night Court (21/16.9)	My Two Dads	**Nightingales**	
NBC	Mid-spring	**Unsolved Mysteries** (17/17.4)		Night Court (21/16.9)	My Two Dads	**Quantum Leap**	
NBC	Summer	**Unsolved Mysteries** (17/17.4)		Night Court (21/16.9)	My Two Dads	Miami Vice	
NBC	Mid-summer	**Unsolved Mysteries** (17/17.4)		Night Court (21/16.9)	**Knight & Daye**	Miami Vice	
NBC	Late summer	**Unsolved Mysteries** (17/17.4)		Night Court (21/16.9)	**FM**	Special programming	

- Notes: **Seinfeld** premiered July 5, 1989 at 9:30 p.m. on NBC. On Fox, **Fox Night at the Movies** premiered on May 17, 1989 with The Fly.

== Thursday ==
Network		8:00 p.m.	8:30 p.m.	9:00 p.m.	9:30 p.m.	10:00 p.m.	10:30 p.m.
ABC	Fall	Special programming					
ABC	Mid-fall	**Knightwatch**		Dynasty		Special programming	
ABC	Winter	**A Fine Romance**		Dynasty		HeartBeat	
ABC	Spring	Special programming		Dynasty		ABC News Specials	
ABC	Summer	**Thursday Night Baseball**					
ABC	Late summer	**A Man Called Hawk** (R)		**Mission: Impossible** (R)		**Primetime Live**	
CBS	Fall	48 Hours		CBS Thursday Night Movie			
CBS	Mid-fall	48 Hours		**Paradise**		Knots Landing (27/16.1) (Tied with The CBS Sunday Movie)	
CBS	Winter	48 Hours		**Paradise**		Knots Landing (27/16.1) (Tied with The CBS Sunday Movie)	
CBS	Spring	48 Hours		The Equalizer		Knots Landing (27/16.1) (Tied with The CBS Sunday Movie)	
CBS	Summer	48 Hours		The Cavanaughs	Coming of Age	The Equalizer	
CBS	Mid-summer	48 Hours		The Equalizer		Knots Landing (27/16.1) (Tied with The CBS Sunday Movie)	
NBC		The Cosby Show (1/25.6)	A Different World (3/23.0)	Cheers (4/22.3)	**Dear John** (11/18.5)	L.A. Law (13/17.6) (Tied with Growing Pains)	

== Friday ==
Network		8:00 p.m.	8:30 p.m.	9:00 p.m.	9:30 p.m.	10:00 p.m.	10:30 p.m.
ABC	Fall	Perfect Strangers	Full House	Mr. Belvedere	Just the Ten of Us	20/20	
ABC	Winter	Perfect Strangers	Full House	Mr. Belvedere	Just the Ten of Us	20/20	
ABC	Spring	Perfect Strangers	Full House	Mr. Belvedere	Just the Ten of Us	20/20	
ABC	Summer	Perfect Strangers	Full House	Mr. Belvedere	Just the Ten of Us	20/20	
ABC	Mid-summer	Perfect Strangers	Full House	Mr. Belvedere	Various programming	20/20	
ABC	Late summer	Full House (R)	Mr. Belvedere (R)	Perfect Strangers (R)	Just the Ten of Us (R)	20/20	
CBS	Fall	Beauty and the Beast		Dallas (29/15.4) (Tied with **The ABC Monday Mystery Movie**)		Falcon Crest	
CBS	Winter	Beauty and the Beast		Dallas (29/15.4) (Tied with **The ABC Monday Mystery Movie**)		Falcon Crest	
CBS	Spring	Beauty and the Beast		Dallas (29/15.4) (Tied with **The ABC Monday Mystery Movie**)		Falcon Crest	
CBS	Summer	Beauty and the Beast		CBS Friday Movie			
NBC	Fall	Sonny Spoon		**Something Is Out There**		Miami Vice	
NBC	Winter	**Father Dowling Mysteries**		Miami Vice		**Unsub**	
NBC	Spring	**The Jim Henson Hour**		**Quantum Leap**		**Unsub**	
NBC	Mid-spring	**The Jim Henson Hour**		Miami Vice		**Dream Street**	
NBC	Summer	Highway to Heaven		NBC Friday Night at the Movies			

== Saturday ==
Network		8:00 p.m.	8:30 p.m.	9:00 p.m.	9:30 p.m.	10:00 p.m.	10:30 p.m.
ABC	Fall	**Murphy's Law**		ABC Saturday Night Movie			
ABC	Mid-fall	ABC Saturday Night Movie				**Murphy's Law**	
ABC	Winter	**Mission: Impossible**		**A Man Called Hawk**		**Murphy's Law**	
ABC	Spring	**Mission: Impossible**		**A Man Called Hawk**		**Men**	
ABC	Mid-spring	**A Man Called Hawk**		ABC Saturday Night Movie			
ABC	Summer	**A Man Called Hawk**		ABC Saturday Night Movie			
CBS	Early fall	First Impressions	Frank's Place (R)	Special programming		West 57th	
CBS	Fall	**Dirty Dancing**	**Raising Miranda**	Simon & Simon		West 57th	
CBS	Mid-fall	**Live! Dick Clark Presents**		Simon & Simon		West 57th	
CBS	Winter	**Dolphin Cove**		**Dirty Dancing**	**Raising Miranda**	West 57th	
CBS	Mid-winter	**Dolphin Cove**		**The Smothers Brothers Comedy Hour**		West 57th	
CBS	Late winter	**TV 101**		**The Smothers Brothers Comedy Hour**		West 57th	
CBS	Spring	**Paradise**		**Jesse Hawkes**		West 57th	
CBS	Summer	**Paradise**		Tour of Duty		West 57th	
Fox	Fall	**The Reporters**		**Beyond Tomorrow**		Local programming	
Fox	Winter	**The Reporters**		**COPS**	**Beyond Tomorrow**	Local programming	
Fox	Spring	**COPS**	**The Reporters**		**Beyond Tomorrow**	Local programming	
Fox	Summer	**COPS**	**The Reporters**		**Beyond Tomorrow**	Local programming	
NBC	Fall	227	Amen (25/16.2) (Tied with The NBC Monday Movie)	The Golden Girls (6/21.4)	**Empty Nest** (9/19.2)	Hunter (19/17.2)	
NBC	Winter	227	Amen (25/16.2) (Tied with The NBC Monday Movie)	The Golden Girls (6/21.4)	**Empty Nest** (9/19.2)	Hunter (19/17.2)	
NBC	Spring	**One of the Boys**	Amen (25/16.2) (Tied with The NBC Monday Movie)	The Golden Girls (6/21.4)	**Empty Nest** (9/19.2)	Hunter (19/17.2)	
NBC	Mid-spring	227	**One of the Boys**	The Golden Girls (6/21.4)	**Empty Nest** (9/19.2)	Hunter (19/17.2)	
NBC	Summer	227	Amen (25/16.2) (Tied with The NBC Monday Movie)	The Golden Girls (6/21.4)	**Empty Nest** (9/19.2)	Hunter (19/17.2)	
NBC	Mid-summer	My Two Dads (R)	Amen (25/16.2) (Tied with The NBC Monday Movie)	The Golden Girls (6/21.4)	**Empty Nest** (9/19.2)	Hunter (19/17.2)	
NBC	Late summer	Amen (25/16.2) (Tied with The NBC Monday Movie)	**13 East**	The Golden Girls (6/21.4)	**Empty Nest** (9/19.2)	Hunter (19/17.2)	

Note: On CBS, Frank's Place consisted of reruns of the 1987-88 sitcom. On ABC, ABC Saturday Mystery Movie was supposed to air 9-11 p.m., but production delays amidst the strike force the move to Mondays.

== By network ==
=== ABC ===
**Returning Series**

- 20/20
- The ABC Monday Night Movie
- ABC Saturday Night Movie
- The ABC Sunday Night Movie
- China Beach
- Dynasty
- Full House
- Growing Pains
- Head of the Class
- HeartBeat +
- Hooperman
- Just the Ten of Us
- MacGyver
- Mr. Belvedere
- Monday Night Football
- Moonlighting
- Perfect Strangers
- Who's the Boss?
- The Wonder Years

**New Series**

- **The ABC Monday Mystery Movie** *
- **Anything But Love** *
- **Coach** *
- **A Fine Romance** *
- **Great Circuses of the World** *
- **Have Faith** *
- **Incredible Sunday**
- **Knightwatch**
- **A Man Called Hawk** *
- **Men** *
- **Mission: Impossible**
- **Murphy's Law**
- **Police Story**
- **The Robert Guillaume Show** *
- **Roseanne**
- **Studio 5-B** *
- **Thursday Night Baseball** *

Not returning from 1987–88:

- The ABC Thursday Night Movie
- Buck James
- The Charmings
- The Disney Sunday Movie
- Dolly
- Family Man
- Hotel
- Hothouse
- I Married Dora
- Just in Time
- Max Headroom
- Monday Night Baseball
- Ohara
- Once a Hero
- Probe
- Pursuit of Happiness
- Sable
- The "Slap" Maxwell Story
- Sledge Hammer!
- Spenser: For Hire
- Supercarrier
- The Thorns

=== CBS ===
**Returning Series**

- 48 Hours
- 60 Minutes
- Beauty and the Beast
- CBS Summer Playhouse
- CBS Sunday Movie
- The Cavanaughs +
- Coming of Age
- Dallas
- Designing Women
- The Equalizer
- Falcon Crest
- Jake and the Fatman +
- Kate & Allie
- Knots Landing
- Murder, She Wrote
- Newhart
- Simon & Simon
- The Smothers Brothers Comedy Hour +
- Tour of Duty +
- West 57th
- Wiseguy

**New Series**

- **Almost Grown**
- **Annie McGuire**
- **Dirty Dancing**
- **Doctor Doctor** *
- **Dolphin Cove** *
- **First Impressions**
- **Hard Time on Planet Earth** *
- **Heartland** *
- **High Risk**
- **Jesse Hawkes** *
- **Live! Dick Clark Presents**
- **Live-In** *
- **Murphy Brown**
- **Paradise**
- **Raising Miranda**
- **TV 101**
- **The Van Dyke Show**

Not returning from 1987–88:

- Blue Skies
- Cagney & Lacey
- Eisenhower & Lutz
- Everything's Relative
- Frank's Place
- High Mountain Rangers
- Houston Knights
- The Law & Harry McGraw
- Magnum, P.I.
- My Sister Sam
- The Oldest Rookie
- Trial and Error

=== Fox ===
**Returning Series**

- 21 Jump Street
- America's Most Wanted
- Duet
- It's Garry Shandling's Show
- Married... with Children
- The Tracey Ullman Show

**New Series**

- **Beyond Tomorrow**
- **Cops** *
- **The Reporters**
- **Totally Hidden Video** *

Not returning from 1987–88:

- Dirty Dozen: The Series
- Family Double Dare
- Mr. President
- The New Adventures of Beans Baxter
- Second Chance/Boys Will Be Boys
- Werewolf
- Women in Prison

=== NBC ===
**Returning Series**

- 227
- ALF
- Amen
- Cheers
- The Cosby Show
- Day by Day
- A Different World
- Family Ties
- The Golden Girls
- Highway to Heaven +
- The Hogan Family @
- Hunter
- In the Heat of the Night
- L.A. Law
- Matlock
- Miami Vice
- My Two Dads +
- NBC Sunday Night Movie
- NBC Monday Night at the Movies
- Night Court
- Sonny Spoon

**New Series**

- **13 East** *
- **Baby Boom**
- **Dear John**
- **Dream Street** *
- **Empty Nest**
- **Father Dowling Mysteries** *
- **The Jim Henson Hour** *
- **Knight & Daye** *
- **The Magical World of Disney**
- **Midnight Caller**
- **Nearly Departed** *
- **Nightingales** *
- **One of the Boys** *
- **Quantum Leap** *
- **Something is Out There**
- **Tattingers**/**Nick & Hillary**
- **Unsolved Mysteries**
- **Unsub** *

Not returning from 1987–88:

- Aaron's Way
- Beverly Hills Buntz
- The Bronx Zoo
- Crime Story
- The Days and Nights of Molly Dodd
- The Facts of Life
- The Highwayman
- J.J. Starbuck
- Our House
- Private Eye
- Rags to Riches
- St. Elsewhere
- A Year in the Life

Note: The * indicates that the program was introduced in midseason.

+ These shows returned as "backup" programming in midseason.

@ Formerly known as Valerie's Family.
