= 1987–88 United States network television schedule =

The 1987–88 network television schedule for the four major English language commercial broadcast networks in the United States covers primetime hours from September 1987 through August 1988. The schedule is followed by a list per network of returning series, new series, and series cancelled after the 1986–87 season.

This is the first fall season in which Fox aired prime-time programming (while it debuted in October 1986, it would only cover late nights until April 1987), making this the first full season since 1958-59 in which a fourth commercial television network (NTA) was broadcasting. Fox would air only two days a week (Saturdays and Sundays) until the spring of 1989.

PBS is not included; member stations have local flexibility over most of their schedules and broadcast times for network shows may vary.

New series are highlighted in bold. Series ending their network runs are highlighted in italics.

All times are U.S. Eastern Time and Pacific Time (except for some live sports or events). Subtract one hour for Central, Mountain, Alaska and Hawaii–Aleutian times.

From February 13 to 28, 1988, all of ABC's primetime programming was preempted in favor of coverage of the 1988 Winter Olympics in Calgary.

Each of the 30 highest-rated shows is listed with its rank and rating as determined by Nielsen Media Research.

== Legend ==
- Light blue indicates local programming.
- Gray indicates encore programming.
- Blue-gray indicates news programming.
- Light green indicates sporting events.
- Red indicates series being burned off and other irregularly scheduled programs, including specials and movies.
- Light gold indicates programming produced outside of the United States.
- Bronze indicates reruns of programming that originally aired on a cable channel.
- highlight Lime highlights indicates the number-one most watched program of the season.
- highlight Yellow highlights indicates the top-10 most watched programs of the season.
- highlight Cyan highlights indicates numbers 11-20 most watched programs of the season.
- highlight Magenta highlights indicates numbers 21-30 most watched programs of the season.
- highlight Highlights indicates that it falls in multiple of the above categories.

== Schedule ==
- New series are highlighted in **bold**.
- All times are U.S. Eastern Time and Pacific Time (except for some live sports or events). Subtract one hour for Central, Mountain, Alaska and Hawaii–Aleutian times.

=== Sunday ===
Network		7:00 p.m.	7:30 p.m.	8:00 p.m.	8:30 p.m.	9:00 p.m.	9:30 p.m.	10:00 p.m.	10:30 p.m.
ABC	Fall	The Disney Sunday Movie		Spenser: For Hire		**Dolly**		**Buck James**	
ABC	Winter	The Disney Sunday Movie				The ABC Sunday Night Movie			
ABC	Spring	The Disney Sunday Movie		**Supercarrier**		The ABC Sunday Night Movie			
ABC	Mid-spring	The Disney Sunday Movie		Special programming		The ABC Sunday Night Movie			
ABC	Summer	The Disney Sunday Movie		MacGyver (R)		The ABC Sunday Night Movie			
CBS		60 Minutes (8/20.6)		Murder, She Wrote (9/20.2)		CBS Sunday Movie (18/17.2)			
Fox	Fall	21 Jump Street		Married... with Children	Various programming	The Tracey Ullman Show	Mr. President	Local programming	
Fox	Mid-fall	21 Jump Street		Werewolf	Married... with Children	The Tracey Ullman Show	Duet	Local programming	
Fox	Winter	21 Jump Street		Werewolf	Married... with Children	**It's Garry Shandling's Show** (R)	Duet	The Tracey Ullman Show	Local programming
Fox	Spring	21 Jump Street		**America’s Most Wanted**	Married... with Children	**It's Garry Shandling's Show** (R)	Duet	The Tracey Ullman Show	Werewolf
Fox	Summer	21 Jump Street		**America’s Most Wanted**	Married... with Children	**It's Garry Shandling's Show** (R)	Duet	The Tracey Ullman Show	Werewolf
NBC	Fall	Our House		Family Ties (17/17.3)	**My Two Dads** (20/16.9) (Tied with Valerie's Family)	NBC Sunday Night at the Movies (23/16.7) (Tied with Head of the Class)			
NBC	Winter	Our House		Family Ties (17/17.3)	**My Two Dads** (20/16.9) (Tied with Valerie's Family)	NBC Sunday Night at the Movies (23/16.7) (Tied with Head of the Class)			
NBC	Spring	Our House		Family Ties (17/17.3)	**Day by Day** (28/16.2)	NBC Sunday Night at the Movies (23/16.7) (Tied with Head of the Class)			
NBC	Summer	Rags to Riches (R)		Family Ties (17/17.3)	**My Two Dads** (20/16.9) (Tied with Valerie's Family)	NBC Sunday Night at the Movies (23/16.7) (Tied with Head of the Class)			

Notes:

- **The Wonder Years** premiered on January 31, 1988 after Super Bowl XXII.
- **It's Garry Shandling's Show** consisted of edited reruns of the Showtime series.

=== Monday ===
Network		8:00 p.m.	8:30 p.m.	9:00 p.m.	9:30 p.m.	10:00 p.m.	10:30 p.m.
ABC	Fall	MacGyver		Monday Night Football (16/17.4)			
ABC	Winter	MacGyver		The ABC Monday Night Movie			
ABC	Spring	MacGyver		The ABC Monday Night Movie			
ABC	Summer	Monday Night Baseball					
CBS	Fall	**Frank's Place**	Kate & Allie	Newhart (25/16.5)	Designing Women	Cagney & Lacey	
CBS	Mid-fall	Kate & Allie	**Frank's Place**	Newhart (25/16.5)	Designing Women	Cagney & Lacey	
CBS	Winter	Kate & Allie	Designing Women	Newhart (25/16.5)	**Frank's Place**	**Wiseguy**	
CBS	Spring	Kate & Allie	Designing Women	Newhart (25/16.5)	**Eisenhower and Lutz**	**Wiseguy**	
CBS	Mid-spring	Kate & Allie	Designing Women	Newhart (25/16.5)	**Eisenhower and Lutz**	Cagney & Lacey	
CBS	Summer	**Blue Skies**		Newhart (25/16.5)	**Eisenhower and Lutz**	Cagney & Lacey	
CBS	Mid-summer	**Blue Skies**		Newhart (25/16.5)	Designing Women (R)	Magnum, P.I. (R)	
CBS	Late summer	Newhart (R)	The Cavanaughs	Kate & Allie (R)	Designing Women (R)	Magnum, P.I. (R)	
NBC		ALF (10/18.8) (Tied with The Wonder Years)	Valerie's Family (20/16.9) (Tied with My Two Dads)	NBC Monday Night at the Movies (26/16.4)			

=== Tuesday ===
Network		8:00 p.m.	8:30 p.m.	9:00 p.m.	9:30 p.m.	10:00 p.m.	10:30 p.m.
ABC	Fall	Who's the Boss? (6/21.2)	Growing Pains (5/21.3)	Moonlighting (12/18.3) (Tied with L.A. Law)		**Thirtysomething**	
ABC	Winter	Who's the Boss? (6/21.2)	**The Wonder Years** (10/18.8) (Tied with ALF)	Moonlighting (12/18.3) (Tied with L.A. Law)		**Thirtysomething**	
ABC	Spring	Who's the Boss? (6/21.2)	**Just the Ten of Us**	Moonlighting (12/18.3) (Tied with L.A. Law)		**Thirtysomething**	
ABC	Summer	Who's the Boss? (6/21.2)	Perfect Strangers (R)	Moonlighting (12/18.3) (Tied with L.A. Law)		**Thirtysomething**	
ABC	Mid-summer	Who's the Boss? (6/21.2)	**Full House** (R)	Moonlighting (12/18.3) (Tied with L.A. Law)		**Thirtysomething**	
CBS	Fall	Houston Knights		**Jake and the Fatman**		**The Law & Harry McGraw**	
CBS	Winter	**48 Hours**		**Jake and the Fatman**		Cagney & Lacey	
CBS	Spring	**Trial and Error**	My Sister Sam	**Coming of Age**	**Frank's Place**	Cagney & Lacey	
CBS	Mid-spring	Houston Knights		The CBS Tuesday Night Movie			
CBS	Summer	CBS Summer Playhouse		The CBS Tuesday Night Movie			
NBC	Fall	Matlock (14/17.8)		**J.J. Starbuck**		Crime Story	
NBC	Mid-fall	Matlock (14/17.8)		Hunter (28/16.1)		Crime Story	
NBC	Winter	Matlock (14/17.8)		Hunter (28/16.1)		Crime Story	
NBC	Spring	Matlock (14/17.8)		**In the Heat of the Night** (19/17.0)		Crime Story	
NBC	Mid-spring	Matlock (14/17.8)		NBC Tuesday Night at the Movies			
NBC	Summer	Matlock (14/17.8)		**J.J. Starbuck**		**NBC Summer Showcase**	
NBC	Mid-summer	Matlock (14/17.8)		**In the Heat of the Night** (R)		**NBC Summer Showcase**	

Notes:

- **Full House** premiered on September 22 at 8:30 pm on ABC.
- The Dictator was supposed to premiere March 15, 1988 at 8:30-9:00 on CBS, but My Sister Sam replaced it at the last minute due to the 1988 Writers Guild of America strike.

=== Wednesday ===
Network		8:00 p.m.	8:30 p.m.	9:00 p.m.	9:30 p.m.	10:00 p.m.	10:30 p.m.
ABC	Fall	Perfect Strangers	Head of the Class (23/16.7) (Tied with The NBC Sunday Night Movie)	**Hooperman**	**The Slap Maxwell Story**	Dynasty	
ABC	Winter	Perfect Strangers	Head of the Class (23/16.7) (Tied with The NBC Sunday Night Movie)	**Hooperman**	**The Slap Maxwell Story**	Dynasty	
ABC	Late winter	Growing Pains (5/21.5)	Head of the Class (23/16.7) (Tied with The NBC Sunday Night Movie)	**Hooperman**	**The Slap Maxwell Story**	Dynasty	
ABC	Spring	Growing Pains (5/21.5)	Head of the Class (23/16.7) (Tied with The NBC Sunday Night Movie)	**Hooperman**	**Just in Time**	**HeartBeat**	
ABC	Mid-spring	Growing Pains (5/21.5)	Head of the Class (23/16.7) (Tied with The NBC Sunday Night Movie)	**Hooperman**	**Just in Time**	**China Beach**	
ABC	Late spring	Growing Pains (5/21.5)	Head of the Class (23/16.7) (Tied with The NBC Sunday Night Movie)	**Hooperman**	**The Slap Maxwell Story**	**China Beach**	
ABC	Summer	Growing Pains (5/21.5)	Head of the Class (23/16.7) (Tied with The NBC Sunday Night Movie)	**Hooperman**	**The Slap Maxwell Story**	Spenser: For Hire (R)	
ABC	Late summer	Growing Pains (5/21.5)	Head of the Class (23/16.7) (Tied with The NBC Sunday Night Movie)	**Hooperman**	**The Slap Maxwell Story**	**China Beach** (R)	
CBS	Fall	**The Oldest Rookie**		Magnum, P.I.		The Equalizer	
CBS	Winter	**The Law & Harry McGraw**		Magnum, P.I.		The Equalizer	
CBS	Spring	**The Smothers Brothers Show**		**Jake and the Fatman**		The Equalizer	
CBS	Summer	**Jake and the Fatman** (R)		The Equalizer (R)		**Wiseguy** (R)	
NBC	Fall	Highway to Heaven		**A Year in the Life**		St. Elsewhere	
NBC	Winter	Highway to Heaven		**A Year in the Life**		St. Elsewhere	
NBC	Mid-winter	**Aaron's Way** (30/16.0)		Highway to Heaven		**A Year in the Life**	
NBC	Spring	**Aaron's Way** (30/16.0)		**A Year in the Life**		The Bronx Zoo	
NBC	Mid-spring	**Aaron's Way** (30/16.0)		Highway to Heaven		St. Elsewhere	
NBC	Summer	Highway to Heaven (R)		The Days and Nights of Molly Dodd	Sara (R)	The Bronx Zoo	
NBC	Mid-summer	Special programming		**George Schlatter's Funny People**		St. Elsewhere (R)	
NBC	Late summer	**George Schlatter's Funny People**		The NBC Wednesday Night Movie			

Note:

- Sara consisted entirely of reruns of the 1985 series.

=== Thursday ===
Network		8:00 p.m.	8:30 p.m.	9:00 p.m.	9:30 p.m.	10:00 p.m.	10:30 p.m.
ABC	Fall	Sledge Hammer!	The Charmings	The ABC Thursday Night Movie			
ABC	Winter	The Charmings	The ABC Thursday Night Movie				
ABC	Spring	**Probe**		Hotel		**Buck James**	
ABC	Mid-spring	Max Headroom		Hotel		**Buck James**	
ABC	Summer	The ABC Thursday Night Movie				**Hothouse**	
CBS	Fall	**Tour of Duty**		**Wiseguy**		Knots Landing	
CBS	Winter	**Tour of Duty**		Simon & Simon		Knots Landing	
CBS	Spring	**48 Hours**		Simon & Simon		Knots Landing	
CBS	Summer	**48 Hours**		Simon & Simon		Cagney & Lacey (R)	
NBC	Fall	The Cosby Show (1/27.8)	**A Different World** (2/25.0)	Cheers (3/23.4)	Night Court (7/20.8)	L.A. Law (12/18.3) (Tied with Moonlighting)	
NBC	Winter	The Cosby Show (1/27.8)	**A Different World** (2/25.0)	Cheers (3/23.4)	Night Court (7/20.8)	L.A. Law (12/18.3) (Tied with Moonlighting)	
NBC	Spring	The Cosby Show (1/27.8)	**A Different World** (2/25.0)	Cheers (3/23.4)	The Days and Nights of Molly Dodd	L.A. Law (12/18.3) (Tied with Moonlighting)	
NBC	Mid-spring	The Cosby Show (1/27.8)	**A Different World** (2/25.0)	Cheers (3/23.4)	Night Court (7/20.8)	L.A. Law (12/18.3) (Tied with Moonlighting)	
NBC	Summer	The Cosby Show (1/27.8)	**A Different World** (2/25.0)	Cheers (3/23.4)	Night Court (7/20.8)	L.A. Law (12/18.3) (Tied with Moonlighting)	

=== Friday ===
Network		8:00 p.m.	8:30 p.m.	9:00 p.m.	9:30 p.m.	10:00 p.m.	10:30 p.m.
ABC	Fall	**Full House**	**I Married Dora**	Max Headroom		20/20	
ABC	Mid-fall	**Full House**	**I Married Dora**	Mr. Belvedere	**Pursuit of Happiness**	20/20	
ABC	Winter	**Full House**	Mr. Belvedere	**The Thorns**	Sledge Hammer!	20/20	
ABC	Late winter	Perfect Strangers	**Full House**	Mr. Belvedere	**The Thorns**	20/20	
ABC	Spring	Perfect Strangers	**Full House**	Mr. Belvedere	**Family Man**	20/20	
ABC	Summer	Perfect Strangers	**Full House**	Mr. Belvedere	**I Married Dora** (R)	20/20	
CBS	Fall	**Beauty and the Beast**		Dallas (22/16.8)		Falcon Crest	
CBS	Winter	**Beauty and the Beast**		Dallas (22/16.8)		Falcon Crest	
CBS	Spring	**Beauty and the Beast**		Dallas (22/16.8)		Falcon Crest	
CBS	Summer	**Beauty and the Beast**		CBS Friday Movie			
NBC	Fall	Rags to Riches		Miami Vice		**Private Eye**	
NBC	Winter	Special programming		Miami Vice		**Sonny Spoon**	
NBC	Late winter	**The Highwayman**		Miami Vice		**Sonny Spoon**	
NBC	Spring	**The Highwayman**		Night Court (7/20.8)	**Beverly Hills Buntz**	Miami Vice	
NBC	Mid-spring	TV's Bloopers & Practical Jokes (R)		**The Highwayman**		Miami Vice	
NBC	Summer	TV's Bloopers & Practical Jokes (R)		**Sonny Spoon** (R)		Miami Vice	
NBC	Mid-summer	TV's Bloopers & Practical Jokes (R)		Blacke's Magic (R)		Miami Vice	

Notes:

- TV's Bloopers and Practical Jokes consisted on reruns of the 1984–86 series.
- Blacke's Magic consisted on reruns of the 1986 series.

=== Saturday ===
Network		8:00 p.m.	8:30 p.m.	9:00 p.m.	9:30 p.m.	10:00 p.m.	10:30 p.m.
ABC	Fall	**Once a Hero**		Ohara		Hotel	
ABC	Mid-fall	**Sable**		Ohara		Hotel	
ABC	Late fall	Ohara		**Sable**		Hotel	
ABC	Winter	**Dolly**		Ohara		Spenser: For Hire	
ABC	Spring	**Dolly**		Ohara		Spenser: For Hire	
ABC	Late spring	**Probe** (R)		Ohara		Spenser: For Hire	
ABC	Summer	**Probe** (R)		Ohara		Hotel (R)	
ABC	Mid-summer	**Supercarrier** (R)		Ohara		Hotel (R)	
ABC	Late summer	**Supercarrier** (R)		Various programming		Spenser: For Hire (R)	
CBS	Fall	My Sister Sam	**Everything's Relative**	**Leg Work**		West 57th	
CBS	Mid-fall	The CBS Saturday Night Movie				West 57th	
CBS	Winter	**High Mountain Rangers**		Houston Knights		West 57th	
CBS	Mid-winter	**High Mountain Rangers**		**Tour of Duty**		West 57th	
CBS	Spring	**High Mountain Rangers**		**Tour of Duty**		West 57th	
CBS	Summer	Kate & Allie (R)	**Frank's Place** (R)	**Tour of Duty**		West 57th	
CBS	Late summer	**First Impressions**	**Frank's Place** (R)	**Tour of Duty**		West 57th	
Fox	Fall	Werewolf	The New Adventures of Beans Baxter	**Second Chance**	Duet	Local programming	
Fox	Mid-fall	Mr. President	**Women in Prison**	The New Adventures of Beans Baxter	**Second Chance**	Local programming	
Fox	Winter	**Boys Will Be Boys**	**Women in Prison**	The New Adventures of Beans Baxter	Mr. President	Local programming	
Fox	Spring	**Family Double Dare**	**Boys Will Be Boys**	Werewolf	Werewolf (R)	Local programming	
Fox	Mid-spring	**Family Double Dare**	**Boys Will Be Boys**	**Dirty Dozen: The Series**		Local programming	
Fox	Summer	**Family Double Dare**	**Family Double Dare**	**Dirty Dozen: The Series**		Local programming	
Fox	Late summer	**The Reporters**		Special programming		Local programming	
NBC	Fall	The Facts of Life	227 (27/16.3)	The Golden Girls (4/21.8)	Amen (15/17.5)	Hunter (29/16.1)	
NBC	Late fall	The Facts of Life	227 (27/16.3)	The Golden Girls (4/21.8)	Amen (15/17.5)	**J.J. Starbuck**	
NBC	Winter	The Facts of Life	227 (27/16.3)	The Golden Girls (4/21.8)	Amen (15/17.5)	**J.J. Starbuck**	
NBC	Spring	The Facts of Life	227 (27/16.3)	The Golden Girls (4/21.8)	Amen (15/17.5)	Hunter (28/16.1)	
NBC	Summer	The Facts of Life	227 (27/16.3)	The Golden Girls (4/21.8)	Amen (15/17.5)	Hunter (28/16.1)	

Note:

- **Second Chance** was retooled into **Boys Will Be Boys**.

== By network ==
=== ABC ===
**Returning Series**

- 20/20
- The ABC Monday Night Movie
- The ABC Sunday Night Movie
- The ABC Thursday Night Movie
- The Charmings
- The Disney Sunday Movie
- Dynasty
- Growing Pains
- Head of the Class
- Hotel
- MacGyver
- Max Headroom
- Mr. Belvedere +
- Monday Night Baseball
- Monday Night Football
- Moonlighting
- Ohara
- Perfect Strangers
- Sledge Hammer!
- Spenser: For Hire
- Who's the Boss?

**New Series**

- **Buck James**
- **China Beach** *
- **Dolly**
- **Family Man** *
- **Full House**
- **HeartBeat** *
- **Hooperman**
- **Hothouse** *
- **I Married Dora**
- **Just in Time** *
- **Just the Ten of Us** *
- **Once a Hero**
- **Probe** *
- **Pursuit of Happiness**
- **Sable**
- **The "Slap" Maxwell Story**
- **Supercarrier** *
- **The Thorns** *
- **The Wonder Years** *
- **thirtysomething**

Not returning from 1986–87:

- The ABC Friday Night Movie
- The ABC Saturday Night Movie
- The Colbys
- Dads
- The Ellen Burstyn Show
- Gung Ho
- Harry
- Heart of the City
- Jack & Mike
- Life with Lucy
- Mariah
- Our World
- Sidekicks
- Starman
- Webster ^

An ^ indicates a show that came back in first-run syndication after a network cancellation.

=== CBS ===
**Returning Series**

- 60 Minutes
- Cagney & Lacey
- Candid Camera
- The Cavanaughs +
- CBS Summer Playhouse
- CBS Sunday Movie
- Dallas
- Designing Women
- The Equalizer
- Falcon Crest
- Houston Knights
- Kate & Allie
- Knots Landing
- Magnum, P.I.
- Murder, She Wrote
- My Sister Sam
- Newhart
- Simon & Simon +
- West 57th

**New Series**

- **48 Hours** *
- **Beauty and the Beast**
- **Blue Skies**
- **Coming of Age** *
- **Eisenhower and Lutz** *
- **Everything's Relative**
- **Frank's Place**
- **High Mountain Rangers** *
- **Jake and the Fatman**
- **The Law & Harry McGraw**
- **The Oldest Rookie**
- **The Smothers Brothers Comedy Hour** *
- **Tour of Duty**
- **Trial and Error** *
- **Wiseguy**

Not returning from 1986–87:

- Better Days
- Downtown
- Hard Copy
- Kay O'Brien
- The New Mike Hammer
- Outlaws
- The Popcorn Kid
- Roxie
- Scarecrow and Mrs. King
- Shell Game
- Spies
- Take Five
- Together We Stand/Nothing Is Easy
- The Twilight Zone
- The Wizard

=== Fox ===
**Returning Series**

- 21 Jump Street
- Duet
- Married... with Children
- Mr. President
- The New Adventures of Beans Baxter
- The Tracey Ullman Show
- Werewolf

**New Series**

- **America's Most Wanted** *
- **Dirty Dozen: The Series** *
- **Family Double Dare** *
- **It's Garry Shandling's Show** * (reruns)
- **Second Chance/Boys Will Be Boys**
- **The Reporters**
- **Women in Prison**

Not returning from 1986–87:

- Down and Out in Beverly Hills
- Karen's Song

=== NBC ===
**Returning Series**

- 227
- ALF
- Amen
- The Bronx Zoo +
- Cheers
- The Cosby Show
- Crime Story
- The Days and Nights of Molly Dodd +
- The Facts of Life
- Family Ties
- The Golden Girls
- Highway to Heaven
- Hunter
- L.A. Law
- Matlock
- Miami Vice
- NBC Sunday Night Movie
- NBC Monday Night at the Movies
- Night Court
- Our House
- Rags to Riches
- St. Elsewhere
- Valerie's Family @

**New Series**

- **Aaron's Way** *
- **Beverly Hills Buntz**
- **Day by Day** *
- **A Different World**
- **George Schlatter's Funny People** *
- **The Highwayman** *
- **In the Heat of the Night** *
- **J.J. Starbuck**
- **Mama's Boy**
- **My Two Dads**
- **Private Eye**
- **Sonny Spoon** *
- **A Year in the Life**

Not returning from 1986–87:

- 1986
- The A-Team
- Amazing Stories
- Easy Street
- Gimme a Break!
- Hill Street Blues
- Me & Mrs. C
- Nothing in Common
- Remington Steele
- Roomies
- Stingray
- Sweet Surrender
- The Tortellis
- You Again?

Note: The * indicates that the program was introduced in midseason.

+ These shows returned as "backup" programming in midseason

@ Formerly Valerie.
