= 1988 in American television =

In 1988, television in the United States saw a number of significant events, including the debuts, finales, and cancellations of television shows; the launch, closure, and rebranding of channels; changes and additions to network affiliations by stations; controversies, business transactions, and carriage disputes; and the deaths of individuals who had made notable contributions to the medium.

== Events ==
| Date | Event |
|---|---|
| January 1 | The season finale of the original Teenage Mutant Ninja Turtles animated series airs in syndication with "Shredder & Splintered". The series will return for a second season in fall. |
| January 1 | Australia Live, a 4-hour TV special about Australia's Bicentennial, airs on A&E. |
| January 1 | NBC broadcasts the Rose Bowl Game for the final time, ending a 37-year partnership. ABC Sports picked up rights to broadcast the game the following year. |
| January 3 | WFYF in Watertown, New York begins broadcasting, giving the Watertown market its first full-time ABC affiliate. |
| January 4 | Nick Jr. begins as a block of Nickelodeon programming for younger children. |
| January 4 | Blackout, hosted by Bob Goen, premieres on CBS. The game show runs for only thirteen weeks, after which The $25,000 Pyramid, the show it replaced, returns to the air on April 4 while CBS develops a revival of Family Feud. |
| January 8 | The ABC sitcom I Married Dora had low ratings and was canceled halfway into its only season. The final episode ended with a scene, known as "breaking the fourth wall," that ranked number 49 on TV Land's list of The 100 Most Unexpected TV Moments. The cameras pulled back to show the entire stage as the cast and crew waved goodbye and performed curtain calls. |
| January 16 | Due to comments he made about breeding practices during slavery leading to blacks becoming superior athletes, CBS fires Jimmy "The Greek" Snyder, who had been a regular on NFL Today since 1976. |
| January 22 | KYMA in Yuma, Arizona signs-on the air, returning ABC programming to the Yuma market for the first time since KECY-TV dropped its affiliation to rejoin CBS in 1985. |
| January 24 | The inaugural Royal Rumble event airs live on the USA Network. The main event saw The Islanders defeat The Young Stallions in a 2 out of 3 falls match. The titular match was won by "Hacksaw" Jim Duggan. |
| January 25 | During that night's edition of the CBS Evening News; anchor Dan Rather enters a nearly 10-minute confrontation with Vice President George H. W. Bush over what Bush knew about the Iran-Contra scandal. |
| January 29 | The Peanuts musical television special Snoopy! The Musical, based on the musical comedy of the same name, premiered on CBS. |
| January 31 | The pilot for The Wonder Years airs following ABC's coverage of Super Bowl XXII. |
| February 5 | Wrestlers Hulk Hogan and André the Giant compete on The Main Event on NBC, marking the return of professional wrestling to network prime-time for the first time since 1955. |
| February 6 | UK animated television series for children Count Duckula (a spinoff of Danger Mouse) begins on Nickelodeon prior to airing in its homeland which will start on September 6 of the same year. |
| February 6 | The writers of The Facts of Life create a controversial storyline in which Natalie (Mindy Cohn) becomes the first of the girls to lose her virginity. Lisa Whelchel (Blair) refused this particular storyline that would have made her character, not Natalie, the first among the four young women in the show to lose her virginity. Having become a Christian when she was 10, Whelchel refused because of her religious convictions. Whelchel appeared in every episode but asked to be written out of "The First Time". The episode ran a parental advisory before starting and placed 22nd in the ratings for the week. |
| February 13 | ABC broadcasts the Opening Ceremonies for the Winter Olympic Games from Calgary. This is ABC's tenth and final Olympic Games that they would broadcast to date. |
| February 21 | Televangelist Jimmy Swaggart, involved with a sex scandal, admits to being with prostitutes and temporarily ends his television ministry. |
| February 22 | The Nickelodeon game show Double Dare begins its third season, airing simultaneously on Nickelodeon and Fox affiliates. Besides the presence of a new network, another big change was the stage left team now wearing blue (the stage right team would continue to wear red) so viewers and crew members could tell the teams apart more easily. Previously, both teams wore red. |
| February 23 | Future Grammy Award-winning recording artist Lauryn Hill (The Fugees frontwoman) makes her television debut on Showtime at the Apollo as a contestant of Amateur Night, where the 13-year-old Hill performed "Who's Lovin' You" by Motown Records singer Smokey Robinson, and gets booed by the audience. |
| February 25 | Totally Minnie, a 45-minute live-action/animated special, premiers on NBC. This marks the first time Russi Taylor voiced Minnie Mouse. |
| February 26 | Tom Hardy marries Simone Ravelle on the ABC soap opera General Hospital, the first interracial wedding on American daytime television. |
| February 29 | CBS airs a special (produced by Lorne Michaels and hosted by Dana Carvey) celebrating the 50th anniversary of comic book superhero Superman's debut. Later in September of this same year, CBS will begin airing a Ruby-Spears produced Superman animated series, which will ultimately last for a single, 13 episode long season. |
| March 2 | Michael Jackson performs a live, extended version of the song "Man in the Mirror" at the 30th Annual Grammy Awards on CBS, having Siedah Garrett, the Winans, and the Andraé Crouch choir perform with him. |
| March 18 | In what would turn out to be her final television appearance, Gilda Radner guest stars on Showtime's It's Garry Shandling's Show. |
| March 19 | "I Heard It Through the Grapevine" experiences a surge of popularity caused by television commercials featuring claymation raisin figures. The California Raisins' version of the song peaks at No. 84 on the Billboard Hot 100. |
| March 20 | Top Cat and the Beverly Hills Cats, the fifth installment of the Hanna-Barbera Superstars 10 telefilm series, is broadcast in syndication. |
| March 27 | The first edition of Clash of the Champions airs on TBS opposite WrestleMania IV on pay-per-view. The main event would be Ric Flair and Sting wrestling to a time limit draw. |
| April 3 | In Jacksonville, Florida, NBC affiliate WJKS (now CW affiliate WCWJ) and ABC affiliate WTLV swap affiliations, reversing a swap that took place in 1980. NBC will later dub this swap one of its most successful affiliation switches ever. |
| April 4 | James Brown appears on CNN after allegedly assaulting his wife with a lead pipe and shooting at her car. During the interview with Sonya Friedman, Brown shouted song titles of his own songs instead of answering questions. |
| April 8 | Ana Alicia's character, Melissa Agretti, dies in a house fire on the CBS drama Falcon Crest. |
| April 11 | WYED-TV, an independent station, serving both Goldsboro, Raleigh, Durham and Fayetteville launches. |
| April 11 | Fox affiliate WVAH-TV moves to channel 11, one of the last remaining channel allocations in the U.S., from UHF channel 23. |
| April 13 | Geraldo Rivera's live special Murder: Live from Death Row is broadcast in syndication; a highlight is Rivera's pre-taped interview with Charles Manson. |
| April 18 | The Disney Channel celebrates its fifth anniversary. |
| April 18 | Nickelodeon debuts the first Kids Choice Awards ceremony. |
| April 25 | Lieutenant Tasha Yar is killed off in an episode of Star Trek: The Next Generation after actress Denise Crosby asked to be released from her contract. |
| May 1 | Magnum, P.I. broadcasts its 2-hour series finale on CBS. It is the fifth highest-rated primetime special of the 1987-88 season with a 32.0 rating and 48% share of the audience. |
| May 6 | The Good, the Bad, and Huckleberry Hound, the sixth installment of the Hanna-Barbera Superstars 10 telefilm series, is broadcast in syndication as part of the 30th anniversary of the character Huckleberry Hound. This film marks the final time Daws Butler voiced Huck, Quick Draw McGraw and Baba Looey, Snagglepuss, Hokey Wolf, and Peter Potamus, as he died two and a half weeks after its telecast from a heart attack. |
| May 7 | The series finale of The Facts of Life airs on NBC. In the two-part episode, Blair buys Eastland to prevent its closing. Blair finds that the school is in such dire financial straits that she is forced to make the school co-ed. Blair then essentially adopts the Mrs. Garrett role as she presides over the school and is forced to deal with the trouble-making students in a plot line that is highly reminiscent of the season two premiere. The new Eastland students included Seth Green, Mayim Bialik, future Oscar-nominee Juliette Lewis, and Meredith Scott Lynn. |
| May 13 | In the season finale of the CBS drama Dallas, character J.R. Ewing pushes over the railing of his high-rise office building the character Nicholas Pierce, and Sue Ellen is so enraged that she fires three shots at Ewing. |
| May 15 | Beverly Hills Cop makes its broadcast network television debut on ABC and is the highest-rated film of the 1987-88 season with a 20.3 rating and 32% share of the audience. |
| May 18 | The Late Show on Fox hosts a reunion of the entire cast of Gilligan's Island. This would prove to be the last time that all of the regular cast members appeared together as Jim Backus, who was suffering from Parkinson's disease at the time, died the following year. |
| May 18–26 | The Stanley Cup Finals between the Edmonton Oilers and Boston Bruins is broadcast on ESPN. This was the final year under ESPN national three-year deal with the National Hockey League. Under the U.S. TV contracts that would take effect beginning next season, SportsChannel America would take over as the NHL's American television partner. ESPN's coverage of the 1988 Cup Finals is blacked out locally in the Boston area due to WSBK and NESN's local rights to Bruins games. |
| May 22 | NBC broadcasts The Incredible Hulk Returns, a continuation of the TV series that aired on CBS from 1978 to 1982. The film also serves as a backdoor pilot for a potential series centering on the Marvel Comics superhero Thor. |
| May 24 | CBS wins the broadcasting rights to the 1992 Winter Olympics after bidding around $243 million. |
| May 28 | The series finale of NBC's St. Elsewhere reveals that the entire series was the product of an autistic boy's imagination. |
| May 30 | After rejecting an offer to join CBS News, Peter Mansbridge replaces Knowlton Nash as anchorman of CBC Television's series The National. |
| June 4 | The Universal Pictures Debut Network broadcasts a special edition of the 1984 film Dune as a two-night event, with additional footage not included in the film's original release. This version totalled at 186 minutes, including a "What happened last night" recap and second credit roll. Director David Lynch disavowed this version and had his name removed from the credits, Alan Smithee being credited instead. |
| June 14 | The CBS soap opera The Young and the Restless tops the daytime ratings (deposing longtime winner General Hospital). |
| June 21 | Game 7 of the NBA Finals between the Los Angeles Lakers and the Detroit Pistons airs on CBS. With a 21.2 rating / 37 share, it would prove to be the highest-rated NBA game in the 17 years that CBS broadcast the NBA (1973-1990). It's also the only NBA game that scored more than 20 ratings points for the network. |
| July 4 | Three years after its cancellation by ABC, CBS resurrects Family Feud for its daytime lineup, featuring new host Ray Combs. A syndicated nighttime version would premiere later in the autumn. |
| July 11 | The day before the Major League Baseball All-Star Game from Cincinnati, TBS televised the annual All-Star Gala from the Cincinnati Zoo. Larry King hosted the broadcast with Craig Sager and Pete Van Wieren handling interviews. The broadcast's big draw would've been the Home Run Derby, which TBS intended on taping during the afternoon, and later airing it in prime time during the Gala coverage. The Gala coverage also had some canned features such as highlights from previous All-Star Games, a segment on Cincinnati's baseball history, a video recap of the season's first half and, a slow-motion highlight montage set to "This Is the Time" by Styx frontman Dennis DeYoung. Unfortunately, the derby and a skills competition were canceled due to rain. As a result, TBS scrambled to try to fill nearly an hour of now-open airtime. For example, the Gatlin Brothers, the event's musical guests, who had already played a full concert, were asked to come back out and play some more. |
| July 12 | The Major League Baseball All-Star Game is broadcast on ABC. This would be the last time that ABC would televise the Midsummer's Classic until the 1995 game from Arlington, Texas. |
| July 14 | The first ever edition of "Shark Week" airs on Discovery Channel. |
| August 1 | The word "Family" is incorporated into the CBN Cable Network's name to better reflect its programming format, rebranding as The CBN Family Channel; shortly after the new name was adopted, however, references to CBN within its name began to be excised in on-air continuity announcements and print promotions for its programs (with the exception of the initialized reference to its parent ministry featured within its logo), referring to it as simply "The Family Channel". |
| August 9 | As a special prime time edition of the Game of the Week, NBC broadcasts the first official night game at Chicago's Wrigley Field between the Cubs and New York Mets. |
| August 27 | Fox affiliate WWPC-TV in Altoona, Pennsylvania (a satellite of WWCP-TV in Johnstown) breaks from its simulcast with WWCP-TV to become an ABC affiliate, returning ABC to Altoona/State College (and giving Johnstown its first full-time ABC affiliate) after Altoona/State College's previous ABC affiliate WOPC-TV went dark in 1982. |
| August 29 | Some of the stations in markets WAXA in Greenville, South Carolina, KMSP in Minneapolis/St. Paul, and KPTV in Portland, Oregon left Fox due to disappointments with the weak network's offerings. The replacement affiliates were WHNS in Greenville, South Carolina, WFTC in Minneapolis/St. Paul, and KPDX in Portland, Oregon. In addition, WTOG already quit Fox on August 8, with WFTS being the network's new affiliate in Tampa Bay, Florida. |
| August 29 | The World Wrestling Federation (now WWE) telecasts the inaugural SummerSlam event on pay-per-view. |
| September 2 | Dick Clark hosts his final episode of the game show Pyramid, ending his 15-year run as host of the program. Clark would make guest appearances on both the 1991 revival hosted by John Davidson and the 2002 revival hosted by Donny Osmond. |
| September 5 | WABC's The Morning Show makes its national syndication debut under its new title Live with Regis and Kathie Lee. |
| September 10 | In Knoxville, Tennessee, CBS affiliate WBIR-TV swaps affiliations with NBC affiliate WTVK in time for NBC Sports' coverage of the 1988 Summer Olympic Games. Shortly after the switch, WTVK moves to channel 8, one of the last remaining VHF channel allocations in the U.S., and becomes WKXT-TV (now WVLT-TV). |
| September 18 | Rockin' with Judy Jetson, the seventh installment of the Hanna-Barbera Superstars 10 series, is broadcast in syndication. This film marks the final time Daws Butler voiced Elroy Jetson, as it was telecast posthumously. |
| September 25 | George H. W. Bush and Michael Dukakis participate in the first of the 1988 presidential debates. |
| September 28 | Univision broadcasts the final of the 11th National OTI Festival live from the Fontainebleau Hilton Hotel in Miami Beach. |
| October 3 | TNT, the fourth cable network owned by Turner Broadcasting, commences programming with a broadcast of the movie Gone with the Wind. |
| October 3 | The Bonus Round in Wheel of Fortune now adopts a Three-and-a-vowel format, which was used till this day, with letters "R", "S", "T", "L", "N" and "E" provided immediately, and the time limit was reduced from 15 seconds to 10. |
| October 4 | As did Cher, actress Shirley MacLaine calls David Letterman an "asshole" during a taping of the NBC talk show Late Night. |
| October 4 | As part of a television special hosted by Patrick Stewart, called The Star Trek Saga: From One Generation to the Next, the first pilot episode of Star Trek: The Original Series, called "The Cage" is broadcast in its entirety for the first time. In some markets, the airing of this special was delayed until October 15, 1988. Prior to this, footage of "The Cage" was incorporated into the Season 1 two-parter episode "The Menagerie". |
| October 4 | ABC under the guidance of new executive producer Geoffrey Mason, debuts fatter and wider graphics that gave off a cleaner, sharper look complete with a black border for their Major League Baseball coverage. ABC also debuts a new energetic, symphonic-pop styled musical theme, composed by Kurt Bestor, which would become an all-compassing theme of sorts for ABC Sports during this time period. |
| October 5 | Senators Dan Quayle and Lloyd Bentsen participate in the 1988 vice presidential debate with the line "Senator, you're no Jack Kennedy" becoming popular. |
| October 5 | Game 2 of the National League Championship Series between the Los Angeles Dodgers and New York Mets is broadcast on ABC. The scheduled start time is approximately 10 p.m. Eastern Time. This is due to ABC's prior commitment to broadcasting the vice presidential debate between Dan Quayle and Lloyd Bentsen. This is the latest ever scheduled start for a League Championship Series baseball game. |
| October 8 | A young Countess Vaughn (winner of Star Search) joins the cast of the NBC comedy 227 as Alexandria DeWitt, a young 11-year-old talented college student, whom the Jenkins' have as a houseguest for a year. |
| October 11 | Turner Broadcasting purchases Jim Crockett Promotions and subsequently rebrands it as World Championship Wrestling. The sale would be completed on November 2, 1988. Three days later, on NWA World Championship Wrestling, "Nature Boy" Ric Flair cut a promo and pointed out a large group of Turner executives in the crowd. This was a subtle nod to Ted Turner purchasing Jim Crockett Promotions. |
| October 13 | Bernard Shaw of CNN asks Michael Dukakis during the second presidential debate a question about his wife and the death penalty that garners controversy. |
| October 15 | Kirk Gibson hits his now iconic walk-off home run off of Dennis Eckersley in Game 1 of the World Series between the Los Angeles Dodgers and Oakland Athletics. Vin Scully and Joe Garagiola are in the broadcast booth for NBC Sports. During the same game at the second inning, NBC affiliate WMGT-TV in Macon, Georgia was hijacked after a technician spliced ten seconds of coverage with a black-and-white pornographic movie. The technician was later fired, and WMGT Production Manager L. A. Sturdivant reported to The Atlanta Constitution at the hijack was reported as an accident. |
| October 15 | CBS airs a highly anticipated college football game between the Notre Dame Fighting Irish and the Miami Hurricanes, colloquially known as "Catholics vs. Convicts". |
| October 16 | Scooby-Doo and the Ghoul School, the eighth installment of the Hanna-Barbera Superstars 10 telefilm series, is broadcast in syndication. It is also part of the Scooby-Doo animated film series. |
| October 18 | The pilot episode for Roseanne is broadcast on ABC. |
| October 21 | Lori Loughlin makes her first appearance as Rebecca Donaldson on ABC's Full House. |
| October 27 | The last of Harding Lemay's "comeback" episodes are broadcast on the NBC soap opera Another World. In the final minutes of the episode, Australian actress Carmen Duncan assumed the role of the legendary bitch Iris Cory Wheeler, after the role had been vacated for many years by Beverlee McKinsey. |
| November 3 | Talk show host Geraldo Rivera's nose is broken during a taping of his show when a fight begins on the set between guests. The theme of the episode was "Young Hate Mongers," and the fight originated between white supremacist Tom Metzger and liberal activist Roy Innis. |
| November 3 | Australian-made 1986 cartoon television movie of King Solomon's Mines by Warwick Gilbert debuts on American television after multiple weeks of promotion and is one of the most-watched children's television shows of the year. |
| November 10 | Milwaukee television station WDJT-TV goes on the air. |
| November 12 | Australian-made 1986 cartoon television movie of King Solomon's Mines by Warwick Gilbert airs for a second time and is the most watched program for children for the second Saturday in a row. |
| November 13 | Mickey's 60th Birthday, which as the title suggests, was a television special produced for the 60th anniversary of the Mickey Mouse character, airs on NBC. |
| November 13 | Back to the Future makes its broadcast network television premiere on NBC. |
| November 13 | Scooby-Doo and the Reluctant Werewolf, the ninth installment of the Hanna-Barbera Superstars 10 telefilm series, is broadcast in syndication. It is also part of the Scooby-Doo animated film series. This is also the last Scooby-Doo production to feature Scrappy-Doo (who debuted as a character in 1979's Scooby-Doo and Scrappy-Doo) as a main protagonist. |
| November 20 | Yogi and the Invasion of the Space Bears, the tenth and final installment of the Hanna-Barbera Superstars 10 series, is broadcast in syndication. This film marks the final time Daws Butler voiced Yogi Bear, as it was telecast posthumously. |
| November 21 | CBS broadcasts Inside the Sexes, a documentary produced by The Body Human's Alfred R. Kelman that features explicit content about human sexuality (including detailed visuals inside human reproductive organs), which prompts several CBS affiliates to broadcast the program with a parental warning at the beginning of the program, at a later time of the day. Some affiliates canceled their broadcast of the program. |
| November 24 | Mystery Science Theater 3000 airs for the first time on KTMA-TV in Minneapolis, Minnesota. |
| November 30 | Good Morning, Miss Bliss, starring Hayley Mills as the titular character, premieres on Disney Channel. Produced by NBC, it marks the first time that a major American television network produced a series specifically for cable television. After one season on the air, the show is soon retooled as Saved by the Bell, which would instead air on NBC's Saturday morning line–up. |
| December 2 | NBC wins the rights to broadcast the 1992 Summer Olympics from Barcelona, Spain, bidding over $401 million. |
| December 8 | Tichina Arnold (later of Martin and Everybody Hates Chris fame) joins the cast of the ABC soap opera Ryan's Hope for what will prove to be its final season. |
| December 11 | Roots: The Gift, the third installment of the Roots series is broadcast on ABC. |
| December 13 | The American Wrestling Association airs its first and only pay-per-view card, SuperClash III. |
| December 14 | CBS pays Major League Baseball approximately US$1.8 billion for exclusive over-the-air television rights for over four years (beginning in 1990). CBS paid about $265 million each year for the World Series, League Championship Series, All-Star Game, and the Saturday Game of the Week. CBS replaces ABC (which had broadcast Monday and later Thursday night baseball games from 1976 to 1989) and NBC (which had broadcast Major League Baseball in some shape or form since 1947 and the Game of the Week exclusively since 1966) as the national broadcast network television home of Major League Baseball. It was one of the largest agreements (to date) between the sport of baseball and the business of broadcasting. The cost of the deal between CBS and Major League Baseball was about 25% more than in the previous television contract with ABC and NBC. The deal with CBS was also intended to pay each team (26 in 1990 and then, 28 by 1993) $10 million a year. |
| December 18 | A Very Brady Christmas airs on CBS and with a 25.1 rating and a 39 share, becomes the second highest rated television film of the year. Its success would soon lead to the creation of a new Brady Bunch series called The Bradys, which only lasts for six episodes. |
| December 26 | CBS' The Young and the Restless becomes the number 1 daytime drama on television, where it remains to this very day. |

== Programs ==
=== Debuting this year ===
The following is a list of shows that premiered in 1988.

| Date | Title | Network |
|---|---|---|
| January 2 | High Mountain Rangers | CBS |
| January 4 | Blackout | CBS |
| January 4 | The World of David the Gnome | Nick Jr. |
| January 11 | T. and T. | Syndication |
| January 15 | The Thorns | ABC |
| January 17 | The New Adventures of Winnie the Pooh | The Disney Channel and ABC |
| January 18 | Home | ABC |
| January 19 | 48 Hours | CBS |
| January 31 | The Wonder Years | ABC |
| February 6 | Count Duckula | Nickelodeon |
| February 7 | America's Most Wanted | Fox |
| February 29 | Day by Day | NBC |
| March 6 | In the Heat of the Night | NBC |
| March 6 | Supercarrier | ABC |
| March 7 | Probe | ABC |
| March 9 | Aaron's Way | NBC |
| March 14 | Eisenhower and Lutz | CBS |
| March 15 | Coming of Age | CBS |
| March 15 | Trial and Error | CBS |
| March 23 | HeartBeat | ABC |
| April 1 | Denver, the Last Dinosaur | Syndication |
| April 6 | Just in Time | ABC |
| April 26 | China Beach | ABC |
| April 26 | Just the Ten of Us | ABC |
| May 8 | Something Is Out There | NBC |
| June 13 | Blue Skies | CBS |
| June 30 | Hothouse | ABC |
| July 1 | Don't Just Sit There | Nickelodeon |
| August 6 | Yo! MTV Raps | MTV |
| August 22 | Later with Bob Costas | NBC |
| August 27 | Chip 'n Dale Rescue Rangers | Disney Channel |
| September 3 | Kids' Court | Nickelodeon |
| September 5 | Fun House | Syndication |
| September 5 | Relatively Speaking | Syndication |
| September 10 | A Pup Named Scooby-Doo | ABC |
| September 10 | The New Adventures of Beany and Cecil | ABC |
| September 10 | ALF Tales | NBC |
| September 10 | Baby Boom | NBC |
| September 10 | The Completely Mental Misadventures of Ed Grimley | NBC |
| September 10 | Beyond Tomorrow | Fox |
| September 10 | Police Academy | Syndication |
| September 12 | Sweethearts | Syndication |
| September 12 | USA Today: The Television Series | Syndication |
| September 12 | Wipeout | Syndication |
| September 17 | Rin Tin Tin: K-9 Cop | CBN Family Channel |
| September 17 | Garfield and Friends | CBS |
| September 17 | Hey Vern, It's Ernest! | CBS |
| September 17 | Superman | CBS |
| September 17 | Fantastic Max | Syndication |
| September 19 | C.O.P.S. | Syndication |
| October 1 | Monsters | Syndication |
| October 2 | Marvel Action Universe | Syndication |
| October 4 | The American Experience | PBS |
| October 4 | High Risk | CBS |
| October 6 | Dear John | NBC |
| October 8 | Empty Nest | NBC |
| October 8 | Freddy's Nightmares | Syndication |
| October 8 | The Munsters Today | Syndication |
| October 8 | Superboy | Syndication |
| October 10 | War of the Worlds | Syndication |
| October 15 | Capital Gang | CNN |
| October 18 | Roseanne | ABC |
| October 23 | Mission: Impossible | ABC |
| October 25 | Midnight Caller | NBC |
| October 26 | Tattingers | NBC |
| October 26 | Annie McGuire | CBS |
| October 26 | The Van Dyke Show | CBS |
| October 27 | Paradise | CBS |
| October 29 | Dirty Dancing | CBS |
| November 2 | Murphy's Law | ABC |
| November 5 | Raising Miranda | CBS |
| November 11 | Knightwatch | ABC |
| November 14 | Murphy Brown | CBS |
| November 24 | Mystery Science Theater 3000 | KTMA-TV |
| November 27 | Almost Grown | CBS |
| November 29 | TV 101 | CBS |
| November 30 | Good Morning, Miss Bliss | Disney Channel |

=== Resuming this year ===
| Title | Final aired | Previous network | Returning network | Date of return |
|---|---|---|---|---|
| Family Feud | 1985 | ABC | CBS | July 4 |
| The Gong Show | 1980 | Syndication | Same | September 12 |
| Gumby | 1968 | NBC | Syndication | Fall 1988 |

=== Changing networks ===
| Show | Moved from | Moved to |
|---|---|---|
| Family Feud | ABC | CBS |
| The New Adventures of Winnie the Pooh | Disney Channel | ABC |
| Double Dare | Nickelodeon | Fox/Syndication |
| Finders Keepers | Nickelodeon | First-run syndication |
| Snorks | NBC | USA Network / First-run syndication |
| Heathcliff | Syndication | Nickelodeon |

=== Entering syndication ===
A list of programs (current or canceled) that have accumulated enough episodes (between 65 and 100) or seasons (3 or more) to be eligible for off-network syndication and/or basic cable runs.

| Show | Seasons |
|---|---|
| The Cosby Show | 4 |
| Kate & Allie | 4 |
| Night Court | 4 |

=== Ending this year ===
| Date | Title | Debut |
|---|---|---|
| January 2 | Sable | 1987 |
| January 8 | I Married Dora | 1987 |
| January 15 | Rags to Riches | 1987 |
| February 10 | The Law & Harry McGraw | 1987 |
| February 11 | The Charmings | 1987 |
| February 12 | Sledge Hammer! | 1986 |
| February 13 | Mr. President | 1987 |
| February 20 | Women in Prison | 1987 |
| March 8 | I'm Telling! | 1987 |
| March 22 | Frank's Place | 1987 |
| March 25 | Lingo (returned in 2002) | 1987 |
| March 26 | 9 to 5 | 1982 |
| March 26 | Dennis the Menace | 1986 |
| March 26 | What's Happening Now!! | 1985 |
| March 28 | Yogi's Treasure Hunt | 1985 |
| March 29 | Trial and Error | 1988 |
| March 30 | We Got It Made | 1983 |
| April 1 | Blackout | 1988 |
| April 9 | High Mountain Rangers | 1988 |
| April 12 | My Sister Sam | 1986 |
| April 14 | Probe | 1988 |
| April 22 | Beverly Hills Buntz | 1987 |
| May 1 | Magnum, P.I. (original series) (Rebooted in 2018) | 1980 |
| May 1 | Truth or Consequences | 1950 |
| May 2 | Jem | 1985 |
| May 3 | Hotel | 1983 |
| May 7 | The Facts of Life | 1979 |
| May 7 | Spenser: For Hire | 1985 |
| May 7 | Ohara | 1987 |
| May 6 | The Highwayman | 1987 |
| May 8 | Our House | 1986 |
| May 10 | Crime Story | 1986 |
| May 10 | Dolly | 1987 |
| May 12 | Max Headroom | 1987 |
| May 14 | Second Chance (aka Boys Will Be Boys) | 1987 |
| May 16 | Cagney and Lacey | 1982 |
| May 25 | St. Elsewhere | 1982 |
| May 25 | Aaron's Way | 1988 |
| May 27 | Punky Brewster (returned in 2021) | 1984 |
| May 28 | Marblehead Manor | 1987 |
| June 3 | The Wind in the Willows | 1986 |
| June 8 | The Slap Maxwell Story | 1987 |
| June 10 | Houston Knights | 1987 |
| June 20 | Eisenhower and Lutz | 1988 |
| June 28 | J.J. Starbuck | 1987 |
| June 29 | The Bronx Zoo | 1987 |
| July 16 | The Little Clowns of Happytown | 1987 |
| July 23 | Solid Gold | 1980 |
| July 24 | Tales from the Darkside | 1984 |
| August 21 | Werewolf | 1987 |
| August 25 | Hothouse | 1988 |
| September 2 | Pyramid (returned in 1991) | 1973 |
| September 3 | Dennis the Menace | 1986 |
| September 3 | The Flintstone Kids | 1986 |
| September 9 | High Rollers | 1974 |
| October 22 | Mighty Mouse: The New Adventures | 1987 |
| October 28 | The Late Show | 1986 |
| November 18 | 3-2-1 Contact | 1980 |
| November 22 | Denver, the Last Dinosaur | 1988 |
| December 3 | The Completely Mental Misadventures of Ed Grimley | 1988 |
| December 7 | The Van Dyke Show | 1988 |
| December 9 | Something Is Out There | 1988 |
| December 17 | Superman | 1988 |
| December 24 | Hey Vern, It's Ernest! | 1988 |
| December 25 | The Care Bears | 1985 |
| December 28 | Annie McGuire | 1988 |
| December 31 | Raising Miranda | 1988 |

=== Made-for-TV movies and miniseries ===
| Title | Network | Premiere date | Notes |
|---|---|---|---|
| Addicted to His Love | ABC | March 28 | |
| Alone in the Neon Jungle | CBS | January 17 | |
| The Ann Jillian Story | NBC | April 1 | Emmy Award nominee for Outstanding Drama or Comedy Special; Highest-rated made-for-TV movie for the 1987-88 season with a 23.8 rating and a 35% share of the audience (excluding the finale of Magnum, P.I. and the Elvis and Me miniseries). |
| April Morning | CBS | April 24 | |
| The Attic: The Hiding of Anne Frank | CBS | April 17 | Emmy Award nominee for Outstanding Drama or Comedy Special |
| Baby M | ABC | May 22 | Emmy Award nominee for Outstanding Miniseries |
| Beryl Markham: A Shadow on the Sun | CBS | May 15 | |
| Bluegrass | CBS | February 28 | |
| Body of Evidence | CBS | January 24 | |
| Bonanza: The Next Generation | Syndication | March 23 | Sequel to Bonanza |
| The Bourne Identity | ABC | May 8 | Emmy Award nominee for Outstanding Miniseries |
| Bring Me the Head of Dobie Gillis | CBS | February 21 | |
| Broken Angel | ABC | March 14 | |
| C.A.T. Squad: Python Wolf | NBC | May 23 | |
| The Caine Mutiny Court-Martial | CBS | May 8 | Based on the 1954 Herman Wouk play directed by Robert Altman |
| Case Closed | CBS | April 9 | |
| Crash Course | NBC | January 1 | |
| David | ABC | October 28 | |
| Desperado: Avalanche at Devil's Ridge | NBC | May 24 | |
| The Dirty Dozen: The Fatal Mission | NBC | February 14 | |
| Earth Star Voyager | ABC | January 17 | |
| Drop-Out Mother | CBS | January 1 | |
| Elvis and Me | ABC | February 7 | Highest-rated miniseries for the 1987-88 season with a 24.4 rating and 36% share of the audience. |
| Evil in Clear River | ABC | January 11 | |
| A Father's Homecoming | NBC | June 19 | |
| A Father's Revenge | ABC | January 24 | |
| Mario Puzo's The Fortunate Pilgrim | NBC | April 3 | Based on Mario Puzo's 1965 novel |
| 14 Going on 30 | ABC | March 6 | |
| Goddess of Love | NBC | November 20 | |
| Hostage | CBS | February 14 | |
| Hot Paint | CBS | March 20 | |
| I Saw What You Did | CBS | May 20 | |
| The Incredible Hulk Returns | NBC | May 22 | |
| Inherit the Wind | NBC | March 20 | Emmy Award winner for Outstanding Drama or Comedy Special |
| Internal Affairs | CBS | November 6 | |
| Jack the Ripper | CBS | October 21 | |
| Justin Case | ABC | May 15 | |
| Laura Lansing Slept Here | NBC | March 7 | |
| Gore Vidal's Lincoln | NBC | March 27 | Based on Gore Vidal's 1984 novel; Emmy Award nominee for Outstanding Miniseries |
| Little Girl Lost | ABC | April 25 | |
| Longarm | ABC | March 6 | |
| Man Against the Mob | NBC | January 10 | |
| Meet the Munceys | ABC | May 22 | |
| Moving Target | NBC | February 8 | |
| The Murder of Mary Phagan | NBC | January 24 | Emmy Award winner for Outstanding Miniseries |
| My Father, My Son | CBS | May 22 | |
| Necessity | CBS | May 3 | |
| Nightingales | NBC | June 27 | Pilot to TV show which debuted the following year |
| Nightmare at Bittercreek | CBS | May 24 | |
| Nitti: The Enforcer | ABC | April 17 | |
| James Clavell's Noble House | NBC | February 21 | |
| Onassis: The Richest Man in the World | ABC | May 1 | |
| Once Upon a Texas Train | CBS | January 3 | |
| Out of Time | NBC | July 17 | |
| Perfect People | ABC | February 29 | |
| Perry Mason The Case of the Avenging Ace | NBC | February 2 | |
| Perry Mason The Case of the Lady in the Lake | NBC | May 5 | |
| Promised a Miracle | CBS | May 19 | |
| Red River | CBS | April 10 | Remake of Red River (1948) |
| The Red Spider | CBS | April 21 | Features characters from One Police Plaza |
| The Return of Desperado | NBC | February 15 | |
| Rock 'n' Roll Mom | ABC | February 7 | |
| Scandal in a Small Town | NBC | April 10 | |
| Shakedown on the Sunset Strip | CBS | April 22 | |
| Sharing Richard | CBS | April 26 | |
| Shattered Innocence | CBS | March 9 | |
| Side by Side | CBS | March 6 | |
| Something Is Out There | NBC | May 8 | |
| Splash, Too | ABC | May 1 | |
| Stone for Ibarra | CBS | January 29 | |
| Stranger on My Land | ABC | January 17 | |
| The Taking of Flight 847: The Uli Derickson Story | NBC | May 2 | Emmy Award nominee for Outstanding Drama or Comedy Special |
| Terrorist on Trial: The United States vs. Salim Ajami | CBS | January 1 | |
| To Heal a Nation | NBC | May 29 | |
| Too Young the Hero | CBS | March 27 | |
| The Tracker | HBO | March 26 | |
| War and Remembrance | ABC | November 13 | 12 part miniseries; sequel to The Winds of War; Emmy Award winner for Outstanding Miniseries |
| Weekend War | ABC | February 1 | |
| What Price Victory | ABC | January 18 | |
| Where the Hell's That Gold? | CBS | November 13 | |
| Who Gets the Friends? | CBS | May 10 | |
| A Whisper Kills | ABC | May 16 | |
| Sidney Sheldon's Windmills of the Gods | CBS | February 7 | Based on Sidney Sheldon's 1987 novel |

== Networks and services ==
=== Launches ===
| Network | Type | Launch date | Notes | Source |
|---|---|---|---|---|
| Channel America | Cable and satellite | Unknown | | |
| The Prayer Channel | Cable television | Unknown | | |
| Vision Interfaith Satellite Network | Cable television | July 1 | | |
| Turner Network Television | Cable television | October 3 | | |

=== Conversions and rebrandings ===
| Old network name | New network name | Type | Conversion Date | Notes | Source |
|---|---|---|---|---|---|
| CBN Cable Network | CBN Family Channel | Cable television | August 1 | | |

=== Closures ===
| Network | Type | Closure date | Notes | Source |
|---|---|---|---|---|
| Festival | Cable television | December 31 | | |
| Harmony Premiere Network | Cable television | Unknown | | |

== Television stations ==
=== Station launches ===
| Date | Market | Station | Channel | Affiliation | Notes/Ref. |
|---|---|---|---|---|---|
| January | Owensboro, Kentucky | WROZ-TV | 61 | Independent | |
| January 1 | Murray/Paducah, Kentucky | W46BE | 46 | Independent | |
| January 1 | Tequesta/West Palm Beach, Florida | WPBF | 25 | ABC | |
| January 1 | Utica, New York | W11BS | 11 | Independent | |
| January 4 | New York City | W57BC | 57 | Independent | LPTV translator of WLIG |
| January 6 | Burlington, Iowa (Quad Cities, Illinois-Iowa) | KJMH | 26 | Fox | |
| January 11 | Lebanon/Nashville, Tennessee | WJFB | 66 | Independent | |
| January 15 | Fort Smith, Arkansas | K46BZ | 46 | Fox | |
| January 22 | Yuma, Arizona (El Centro, California) | KYMA-DT | 11 | ABC | |
| January 27 | Tuscaloosa/Birmingham, Alabama | W52AI | 52 | TBN | |
| January 29 | Indianapolis, Indiana | W11BV | 11 | Independent | |
| February 1 | Cedar Rapids, Iowa | KOCR-TV | 28 | Fox Broadcasting Company | |
| February 8 | Honolulu, Hawaii | KFVE | 9 | Independent | |
| February 8 | Jamestown/Valley City, North Dakota | KJRR | 7 | Fox | |
| February 8 | Orlando, Florida | WCEU | 15 | PBS | |
| February 13 | Kansas City, Missouri | KMCI-TV | 38 | HSN | |
| February 22 | Kingman, Arizona | KMOH-TV | 6 | Independent | |
| March | Heiskell/Knoxville, Tennessee | W12BU | 12 | Independent | |
| March 1 | Brainerd, Minnesota | KAWB | 22 | PBS | |
| March 7 | Greensboro, North Carolina | W14AU | 14 | Independent | |
| March 11 | Charlotte, North Carolina | W53AO | 53 | Independent | |
| March 13 | Waco, Texas | KXXV | 25 | NBC | |
| March 28 | Indianapolis, Indiana | W27AR | 27 | Independent | |
| April 3 | Wichita, Kansas | KAAS-TV | 17 | Fox | |
| April 11 | Raleigh, North Carolina | WYED | 17 | Independent | |
| May 18 | Houston, Texas | KUYA | 22 | TBN | |
| May 20 | Panama City, Florida | WPGX | 28 | Fox | |
| May 25 | Washington, D.C. | W14AA | 14 | Univision | |
| June 1 | Kenosha/Milwaukee, Wisconsin | WHKE | | Religious ind. | |
| June 8 | Indianapolis, Indiana | WBUU | 69 | Educational ind. | |
| July 22 | Panama City, Florida | WFSG-TV | 56 | PBS | |
| July 22 | South Bend, Indiana | W12BK | 12 | Independent | LPTV translator of WCIU-TV |
| August 19 | Phoenix, Arizona | K69HJ | 69 | Independent | |
| August 20 | Denver, Colorado | KWBI-TV | 41 | Religious ind. | |
| August 29 | Amarillo, Texas | KACV-TV | 2 | PBS | |
| September 1 | Dallas/Fort Worth, Texas | KFWD | 52 | Telemundo | |
| September 1 | Denton, Texas (Dallas/Fort Worth, Texas) | KDTN | 2 | PBS | |
| September 24 | Buffalo, New York | WTJA-TV | 26 | Independent (Note: WTJA was previously on the air from 1966 to 1969 as WNYP-TV.) | |
| October 3 | Oklahoma City, Oklahoma | KSBI | 52 | Independent | |
| October 15 | Lexington, Kentucky | WLKT-TV | 62 | Independent | |
| October 18 | Odessa/Midland, Texas | KMLM-TV | 42 | God's Learning Channel | |
| November 1 | Milwaukee, Wisconsin | WDJT-TV | | Independent | |
| November 28 | Rapid City, South Dakota | K15AC | 15 | CBS | |
| December | Orlando, Florida | WKCF | 18 | Independent | |
| December | Washington, D.C. | W42AJ | 43 | Telemundo | |
| December 1 | Denver, Colorado | KTVD | 20 | Independent | |
| December 1 | Pine Bluff/Little Rock, Arkansas | KVTN-TV | 25 | Religious ind. | |
| December 9 | Brooklyn/New York City, New York | W54AY | 54 | unknown | |
| December 17 | Riverside, California (Los Angeles) | KSLD | 62 | Asian independent | |
| December 23 | Cheyenne, Wyoming | KLWY | 27 | Fox | |
| December 27 | Bloomington, Indiana | WIIB | 63 | HSN | |
| December 30 | Williamsport, Pennsylvania (Scranton/Wilkes-Barre, Pennsylvania) | WDZA | 53 | Fox | |
| December 31 | Lebanon, Kentucky | K06AY | 6 | Independent | |
| Unknown date | Buffalo, New York | W58AV | 58 | Channel America | |
| Unknown date | Key West, Florida | WETV | 13 | Educational independent | |
| Unknown date | Kona, Hawaii | KSHQ | 6 | Independent | |
| Unknown date | Manchester, New Hampshire | W13BG | 13 | FamilyNet | |
| Unknown date | Morehead City, North Carolina | WFXI | 8 | Fox | |
| Unknown date | Springfield, Massachusetts | W42AU | 42 | TBN | |
| Unknown date | Tampa, Florida | WBHS | 62 | Home Shopping Network | |
| Unknown date | West Palm Beach, Florida | W19AQ | 19 | Independent | |
| Unknown date | Wichita Falls, Texas | K35BO | 35 | Independent | |

=== Stations changing network affiliation ===
| Market | Date | Station | Channel | Prior affiliation | New affiliation |
|---|---|---|---|---|---|
| Columbia, South Carolina | June 11 | WACH | 57 | Independent | Fox |
| Concord, New Hampshire | February 1 | WNHT | 21 | Independent | CBS |
| Davenport, Iowa | January 6 | KLJB-TV | 18 | Fox | Independent |
| Erie, Pennsylvania | May 23 | WETG | 66 | Independent | Fox |
| Greenville/Spartanburg, South Carolina (Anderson, South Carolina) | August 29 | WHNS | 21 | Independent | Fox |
| Greenville/Spartanburg, South Carolina (Anderson, South Carolina) | August 29 | WAXA | 40 | Fox | Independent |
| Jacksonville, Florida | April 3 | WTLV | 12 | ABC | NBC |
| Jacksonville, Florida | April 3 | WJKS-TV | 17 | NBC | ABC |
| Johnstown/Altoona, Pennsylvania | August 27 | WATM-TV | 23 | Fox | ABC |
| Omaha, Nebraska | August 28 | KPTM | 42 | Independent | Fox |
| Knoxville, Tennessee | September 10 | WBIR-TV | 10 | CBS | NBC |
| Knoxville, Tennessee | September 10 | WTVK | 26 | NBC | CBS |
| Laredo, Texas | October 31 | KLDO-TV | 27 | ABC | Univision |
| Minneapolis/St. Paul, Minnesota | August 29 | KMSP-TV | 9 | Fox | Independent |
| Minneapolis/St. Paul, Minnesota | August 29 | KITN-TV | 29 | Independent | Fox |
| Portland, Oregon (Vancouver, Washington) | August 29 | KPTV | 12 | Fox | Independent |
| Portland, Oregon (Vancouver, Washington) | August 29 | KPDX | 49 | Independent | Fox |
| Tampa/St. Petersburg, Florida | August 8 | WFTS-TV | 28 | Independent | Fox |
| Tampa/St. Petersburg, Florida | August 8 | WTOG | 44 | Fox | Independent |

=== Station closures ===
| Date | City of license/Market | Station | Channel | Affiliation | Sign-on date | Notes |
|---|---|---|---|---|---|---|
| April 8 | Natchez, Mississippi | WNTZ-TV | 33 | Independent | November 16, 1985 | Would return to the air in 1991 as a Fox affiliate |
| May 31 | Hot Springs, Arkansas | KRZB-TV | 26 | Independent | February 7, 1986 | |

== Births ==
| Date | Name | Notability |
|---|---|---|
| January 3 | Karl Glusman | Actor |
| January 7 | Haley Bennett | Actress and singer |
| January 7 | Robert Sheehan | Actor |
| January 8 | Lily Nicksay | Actress (Boy Meets World) |
| January 12 | Andrew Lawrence | Actor (Brotherly Love, Oliver Beene, Hawaii Five-0, voice of T.J. Detweiler on Recess (1998–2001)) |
| January 18 | Ashleigh Murray | Actress (Riverdale) |
| January 21 | John Early | Actor |
| January 22 | Nick Palatas | Actor |
| January 28 | Alexandra Krosney | Actress (Last Man Standing) |
| January 30 | Rob Pinkston | Actor (Ned's Declassified School Survival Guide) |
| February 2 | Zosia Mamet | Actress |
| February 4 | Charlie Barnett | Actor (Chicago Fire) |
| February 6 | Bailey Hanks | Actress and singer |
| February 6 | David Boyd | Singer |
| February 6 | Anna Diop | Senegalese-American actress (Titans) |
| February 8 | Ryan Pinkston | Actor (Quintuplets, Tower Prep) |
| February 11 | Jazz Raycole | Actress (My Wife and Kids) |
| February 15 | Jessica De Gouw | Australian actress (Dracula) |
| February 18 | Maiara Walsh | Actress (Desperate Housewives, Cory in the House) |
| February 18 | Sarah Sutherland | Actress (Veep) |
| February 18 | Shane Lyons | Actor (All That) |
| February 19 | Stacie Chan | Voice actress (Jackie Chan Adventures) |
| February 20 | Rihanna | Singer and actress (Bates Motel) |
| February 20 | Tracy Spiridakos | Actress |
| February 22 | Marieve Herington | Actress |
| February 24 | Alexander Koch | Actor (Under the Dome) |
| February 29 | Reilly Dolman | Actor |
| February 29 | Joel Kim Booster | Actor |
| March 1 | Katija Pevec | Actress (Just for Kicks) |
| March 3 | Josh Duggar | Actor (19 Kids and Counting) and television personality |
| March 8 | Kendrick Sampson | Actor |
| March 10 | Ego Nwodim | Actress |
| March 22 | Tania Raymonde | Actress (Malcolm in the Middle, Lost, Death Valley) |
| March 24 | Finn Jones | English actor (Game of Thrones) |
| March 24 | Nick Lashaway | American actor (died 2016) |
| March 25 | Ryan Lewis | Rapper |
| March 25 | Erik Knudsen | Actor |
| March 27 | Brenda Song | Actress (100 Deeds for Eddie McDowd, The Suite Life of Zack & Cody, The Suite Life on Deck, Scandal, New Girl, Dads, Pure Genius), voice actress (Miles from Tomorrowland, Amphibia) |
| March 27 | Holliday Grainger | English actress (Where the Heart Is, The Borgias) |
| April 2 | Francesca Catalano | Actress (Just for Kicks) |
| April 2 | Jesse Plemons | Actor |
| April 4 | Maggie Geha | Actress (Gotham) |
| April 7 | Ed Speleers | Actor |
| April 10 | Haley Joel Osment | Actor (Thunder Alley, The Jeff Foxworthy Show) |
| April 10 | Molly Bernard | Actress |
| April 13 | Allison Williams | Actress (Girls) and singer |
| April 13 | Katie Lucas | Actress |
| April 14 | Chris Wood | Actor (The Vampire Diaries, Containment) |
| April 15 | Benedict Samuel | Actor |
| April 18 | Kayleigh McEnany | Political commentator and former White House Press Secretary (CNN, Fox News) |
| April 18 | Nicolette Robinson | Actress |
| April 21 | Christoph Sanders | Actor (Ghost Whisperer, Last Man Standing) |
| April 21 | Robbie Amell | Canadian actor (True Jackson, VP, The Tomorrow People, The Flash) |
| April 23 | Carla Quevedo | Argentine actress (Show Me a Hero) |
| April 25 | Sara Paxton | Actress (SpongeBob SquarePants, Greetings from Tucson, Summerland, Darcy's Wild Life) and singer |
| April 27 | Austin Amelio | Actor |
| April 30 | Ana de Armas | Cuban actress (The Boarding School) |
| May 1 | Nicholas Braun | Actor (10 Things I Hate About You) |
| May 3 | Remington Hoffman | Actor (Days of Our Lives, Zatima) |
| May 4 | LaRoyce Hawkins | Actor |
| May 5 | Brooke Hogan | Actress (Hogan Knows Best) |
| May 5 | Adele | Singer |
| May 8 | Trisha Paytas | Singer |
| May 11 | Danielle Pinnock | Actress |
| May 16 | Behati Prinsloo | Model |
| May 17 | Nikki Reed | Actress |
| May 19 | Zack Pearlman | Actor |
| May 22 | Heida Reed | Actress |
| May 24 | Kimberley Crossman | New Zealand-born actress |
| May 24 | Callie Hernandez | Actress |
| June 2 | Amber Marshall | Canadian actress |
| June 2 | Zuri Hall | Actress |
| June 6 | Kristen Gutoskie | Canadian actress |
| June 7 | Michael Cera | Canadian actor (Arrested Development) |
| June 9 | Mae Whitman | Actress (Arrested Development, Parenthood, Good Girls), voice actress (Johnny Bravo, Teacher's Pet, American Dragon: Jake Long, Avatar: The Last Airbender, Family Guy, Teenage Mutant Ninja Turtles, DC Super Hero Girls) |
| June 11 | Claire Holt | Actress (H_{2}O: Just Add Water, The Vampire Diaries, The Originals, Aquarius) |
| June 12 | Cody Horn | Actress |
| June 13 | Cody Walker | Actor |
| June 14 | Kara Kilmer | Actress (Chicago Fire) |
| June 14 | Kevin McHale | Actor (Glee) and singer |
| June 20 | Shefali Chowdhury | Actress (Harry Potter) |
| June 22 | Portia Doubleday | Actress (Mr. Sunshine, Mr. Robot) |
| June 22 | Karla Crome | Actress |
| June 24 | Candice Patton | Actress (The Game, The Flash) |
| June 27 | Alanna Masterson | Actress (The Young and the Restless, First Day, The Walking Dead) |
| June 30 | Sean Marquette | Actor (Titus, The Goldbergs), voice actor (Johnny Bravo, Rocket Power, Foster's Home for Imaginary Friends) |
| July 1 | Evan Ellingson | Actor (Complete Savages CSI: Miami) |
| July 6 | Brittany Underwood | Actress (One Life to Live, Hollywood Heights) and singer |
| July 6 | Cody Fern | Actor |
| July 10 | Heather Hemmens | Actress |
| July 10 | Katie Pavlich | American conservative commentator |
| July 12 | Ta'Rhonda Jones | Actress (Empire) and rapper |
| July 13 | Colton Haynes | Actor (Teen Wolf, Arrow) |
| July 13 | Steven R. McQueen | Actor (The Vampire Diaries, Chicago Fire) |
| July 14 | Conor McGregor | Irish mixed martial artist and actor |
| July 15 | Aimee Carrero | Dominican actress (Level Up, Young & Hungry, Elena of Avalor, She-Ra and the Princesses of Power) |
| July 20 | Julianne Hough | Singer and actress (Dancing with the Stars) |
| July 20 | Chloe Fineman | Actress |
| July 24 | Joe Pera | Actor |
| July 26 | Francia Raisa | Actress (The Secret Life of the American Teenager) |
| July 30 | Nico Tortorella | Actor (Make It or Break It, Younger) |
| July 31 | Charlie Carver | Actor (Teen Wolf) |
| August 1 | Max Carver | Actor (Desperate Housewives, Teen Wolf) |
| August 1 | Sasha Jackson | British actress |
| August 3 | Christine Ko | Actress |
| August 12 | Leah Pipes | Actress (Life is Wild, The Deep End, The Originals) and singer |
| August 16 | Kevin Schmidt | Actor (The Young and the Restless, Unnatural History) |
| August 16 | Rumer Willis | Actress (Dancing with the Stars season 20 [winner]) and daughter of Bruce Willis and Demi Moore |
| August 16 | Parker Young | Actor |
| August 17 | Brady Corbet | Actor |
| August 19 | Cody Ross Pitts | Actor |
| August 23 | Kim Matula | Actress (The Bold and the Beautiful) |
| August 26 | Danielle Savre | Actress (Summerland, Heroes, Kaya, Too Close to Home) |
| August 26 | Evan Ross | Actor |
| August 27 | Alexa PenaVega | Actress (Life's Work, Ladies Man, Ruby & The Rockits) and singer |
| August 28 | Shalita Grant | Actress (NCIS: New Orleans, Mercy Street) |
| September 1 | Angus McLaren | Australian actress (H_{2}O: Just Add Water) |
| September 1 | Vaneza Pitynski | Actress (The Brothers García) |
| September 6 | Max George | British actor (The Wanted) and singer |
| September 15 | Chloe Dykstra | Actress |
| September 15 | Chelsea Kane | Actress (Jonas, Fish Hooks, Baby Daddy) and singer |
| September 19 | Katrina Bowden | Actress (30 Rock, Public Morals) |
| September 20 | Clark James Gable | Actor (died 2019) |
| September 23 | Bryan Hearne | Actor (All That) |
| September 24 | Kyle Sullivan | Actor (Malcolm in the Middle, Whatever Happened to Robot Jones?, Fillmore!, All That, The War at Home) |
| September 26 | James Blake | Singer |
| September 28 | Olivia Jordan | Actress, model, television host, Miss USA 2015 |
| September 28 | Hana Mae Lee | Actress |
| October 1 | Cariba Heine | Actress (H_{2}O: Just Add Water) |
| October 2 | Laura Rutledge | Reporter and host for ESPN |
| October 3 | Alicia Vikander | Actress (Second Avenue) |
| October 4 | Melissa Benoist | Actress (Glee, Supergirl) and singer |
| October 5 | Bobby Edner | Actor |
| October 10 | Rose McIver | Actress (iZombie) |
| October 14 | MacKenzie Mauzy | Actress (Guiding Light, The Bold and the Beautiful, Forever) |
| October 14 | Max Thieriot | Actor |
| October 17 | Dee Jay Daniels | Actor (The Hughleys) |
| October 19 | Parveen Kaur | Actress |
| October 21 | Glen Powell | Actor (Scream Queens) |
| October 21 | Mark Rendall | Canadian voice actor (Arthur, The Save-Ums!, Time Warp Trio, Wayside) |
| October 28 | Devon Murray | Actor (Harry Potter) |
| October 29 | Cherilyn Wilson | Actress (I Heart Vampires, Greetings from Home) |
| October 30 | Janel Parrish | Actress (Pretty Little Liars) |
| November 2 | Lindze Letherman | Actress (General Hospital) |
| November 3 | Angus McLaren | Australian actor (Neighbours, H_{2}O: Just Add Water) |
| November 6 | Emma Stone | Actress (Drive) |
| November 7 | Reid Ewing | Actor (Modern Family) |
| November 8 | Jessica Lowndes | Actress (90210) and singer |
| November 9 | Nikki Blonsky | Actress (Huge) and singer |
| November 11 | Alexandra Kyle | Actress |
| November 22 | Jamie Campbell Bower | Actor |
| November 25 | Abby Phillip | American journalist |
| November 26 | Tamsin Egerton | English actress (Camelot) |
| November 28 | Scarlett Pomers | Actress (Reba) |
| November 29 | Russell Wilson | Football quarterback |
| November 30 | Rebecca Rittenhouse | Actress (Red Band Society, Blood & Oil) |
| December 1 | Ashley Monique Clark | Actress (The Hughleys) |
| December 1 | Zoë Kravitz | Actress |
| December 1 | Nadia Hilker | Actress |
| December 2 | Alfred Enoch | Actor (Harry Potter, How to Get Away With Murder) |
| December 3 | Jamie Erdahl | Reporter |
| December 5 | Ross Bagley | Actor |
| December 8 | Tru Valentino | Actor |
| December 11 | Ashley Hinshaw | Actress and model |
| December 11 | Allie LaForce | Model |
| December 14 | Vanessa Hudgens | Actress (High School Musical, The Suite Life of Zack & Cody) and singer |
| December 15 | Emily Head | English actress (The Inbetweeners) |
| December 16 | Anna Popplewell | English actress (Reign) |
| December 21 | Teresa Ruiz | Actress |
| December 21 | Shelley Regner | Actress |

== Deaths ==
| Date | Name | Age | Notability |
|---|---|---|---|
| January 3 | William Cagney | 82 | Actor |
| February 1 | Heather O'Rourke | 12 | Actress (Poltergeist, Happy Days) |
| February 17 | Alexander Bashlachev | 27 | Soviet singer |
| March 10 | Andy Gibb | 30 | Singer (Solid Gold) |
| April 5 | Alf Kjellin | 68 | Actor and director |
| April 25 | Carolyn Franklin | 43 | Singer |
| April 27 | David Scarboro | 20 | English actor (EastEnders) |
| May 15 | Andrew Duggan | 64 | Character actor (Lancer) |
| May 21 | Sammy Davis Sr. | 87 | Dancer |
| May 18 | Daws Butler | 71 | Voice actor (The Yogi Bear Show, The Jetsons, several animated commercials) |
| May 27 | Florida Friebus | 78 | Actress (The Bob Newhart Show, Dobie Gillis) |
| June 25 | Hillel Slovak | 26 | Israeli-American musician (Red Hot Chili Peppers) |
| July 21 | Jack Clark | 62 | Game show announcer (Wheel of Fortune) |
| July 25 | Judith Barsi | 10 | Child actress |
| July 31 | Trinidad Silva | 38 | Actor (Jesus Martinez on Hill Street Blues), in a car accident |
| September 11 | John Sylvester White | 68 | Actor (Welcome Back, Kotter) |
| September 29 | Charles Addams | 76 | Cartoonist whose drawings inspired (The Addams Family) |
| October 11 | Wayland Flowers | 48 | Puppeteer (Madame's Place) |
| October 31 | John Houseman | 86 | Actor (The Paper Chase, Silver Spoons) |
| December 6 | Timothy Patrick Murphy | 29 | Actor (Dallas) |
| December 12 | Dick Clair | 57 | Comedy writer (The Carol Burnett Show, The Facts of Life) |
| December 20 | Max Robinson | 49 | ABC World News correspondent |
| December 27 | Jess Oppenheimer | 75 | Comedy writer who created (I Love Lucy) |

== See also ==
- 1988 in the United States
- List of American films of 1988
