= Aerodrome Pictures =

American Mass Media Company

- Type: Private company
- Industry: Animation; Live-action broadcast design commercials main titles
- Founded: 1985
- Founder: R. Scott Miller
- Headquarters: Los Angeles, California, United States
- Products: Broadcast design Logos; Print design Network ID's; Film & show titles
- Website: www.aerodrome.com

Aerodrome Pictures is an American design studio that has provided branding for many television channels worldwide. The company was originally formed in 1985 by R. Scott Miller.

Over the next three decades, the studio produced graphics for many channels, including HBO Family, Fox Broadcasting Company, Sci-Fi Channel among others. The studio also produced various film & show titles.

== History ==
R. Scott Miller set up Scott Miller & Associates Inc. in 1985 and designed the original graphics for the Discovery Channel and Turner Network Television. In 1992, as Scott Miller & Associates was working on the network identity for Sci-Fi Channel, it renamed itself as Aerodrome Pictures. Aerodrome hired more people to work at the studio as the company began winning more awards, including nine Emmy awards, at this time. In the late-2000s, the company started to fall in popularity, but afterward, they continued to grow slowly.

== List of re-brands and titles by the studio ==
=== Scott Miller & Associates Inc. ===
- Discovery Channel (1985)
- Telemundo (1987)
- Fox (1988)
- Turner Network Television (1988)
- Monday Night Football (1988)
- The Reporters (1988)
- Sci-Fi Channel (1992)

=== Aerodrome Pictures ===
- HBO Family (1996)
- STS (1997)
- FX (1997)
- Discovery Channel (1997)
- FitTV (1998)
- ABC Sports (2001)
- South Park (2001)
- Fox (2002)
- FitTV (2003)
- Fox Sports Net (2003)
- National Geographic Channel (2004)
- Universal Channel (2004)
- American Idol (2005)
- Paramedia (2005)
- America's Got Talent (2006)
- TF1 (2006)
- Unbeatable Banzuke (2008)
- Beyond Twisted (2009)
- American Ninja Warrior (2009)
- Let's Ask America (2012)
- The Arsenio Hall Show (2013)
- TMZ on TV (2013)
