= Andrew D. Weyman =

American television director and producer

- Born: Brooklyn, New York
- Occupation(s): Television director, television producer
- Years active: 1980–present

Andrew D. Weyman is an American television director and producer.

== Life and career ==
He was born and raised in Brooklyn, New York and educated at Kingsborough Community College and Brooklyn College.

His directing and producing credits include:

The King of Queens, The Ellen Show, The Big Bang Theory, Cybill, Two and a Half Men, Yes, Dear, Bette, Lucky Louie, The Gregory Hines Show, Work with Me, Still Standing, Listen Up, The Brian Benben Show, Joey, Life on a Stick, The Martin Short Show, Roseanne, Trial and Error, Ellen, All-American Girl, The Jackie Thomas Show, Bob, The Fanelli Boys, Carol & Company, My Two Dads, Head of the Class, Santa Barbara, Joe's Life, The Cavanaughs, Loving, Texas, Another World, As the World Turns, The Edge of Night, Guiding Light, Search for Tomorrow and Ned & Stacey.

== Awards and nominations ==
Nominated for a 1980 Daytime Emmy Award for Outstanding Direction For A Daytime Drama Series: Another World. He shared this nomination with Ira Cirker, Melvin Bernhardt, Robert Calhoun, Barnet Kellman and Jack Hofsiss.
