= Raising Miranda =

Television series

- Genre: Sitcom
- Created by: Jane Anderson
- Starring: James Naughton; Royana Black; Steve Vinovich; Miriam Flynn; Bryan Cranston
- Country of origin: United States
- Original language: English
- No. of seasons: 1
- No. of episodes: 9 (2 unaired)

Production
- Running time: 30 minutes
- Production company: GTG Entertainment

Original release
- Network: CBS
- Release: November 5 – December 31, 1988

Royana Black and James Naughton in a publicity photo for Raising Miranda.

Raising Miranda is an American sitcom that aired on CBS in 1988 as part of its fall lineup. Starring James Naughton and Royana Black, it depicted the struggles of a father and his teenage daughter to adjust to their circumstances after their wife and mother abandons their family.

== Premise ==
Donald Marshak, a building contractor in Racine, Wisconsin, suddenly finds himself a single parent when his wife Bonnie attends a self-improvement class and abruptly abandons him and their smart, sensitive 15-year-old daughter Miranda, in order to go "find herself." The un-domestic Donald is forced to serve as both father and mother to a distressed teenage girl.

Marcine Lundquist is Miranda's lifelong best friend and confidante and Jack Miller is a new transfer student Miranda has befriended at school. Joan and Bob Hoodenpyle are the Marshaks' noodly neighbors and friends. Miranda's wacky, unemployed Uncle Russell is Donald's brother-in-law and buddy and lives in a van permanently parked in the Marshaks' driveway.

== Cast ==
- James Naughton as Donald Marshack
- Royana Black as Miranda Marshack
- Miriam Flynn as Joan Hoodenpyle
- Steve Vinovich as Bob Hoodenpyle
- Amy Lynne as Marcine Lundquist
- Michael Manasseri as Jack Miller
- Bryan Cranston as Russell

== Production ==
Despite its rather grim premise — a wife and mother abandoning her family — the show was billed as a situation comedy, the humor being derived from Donald Marshak's challenges in parenting after the departure of his wife.

Portraying Donald's brother-in-law and Miranda's uncle Russell, Bryan Cranston appeared in his first regular primetime television role in Raising Miranda.

== Reception ==
Raising Miranda received generally poor reviews from critics.

== Broadcast history ==
Raising Miranda aired on CBS on Saturday nights at 8:30 p.m. Eastern Time, up against NBC's hit sitcom Amen. It premiered on November 5, 1988. After seven episodes averaged a poor 6.0 rating, CBS cancelled the series. Its last episode was broadcast on December 31, 1988, leaving two of its nine episodes unaired.

Black never starred in another TV series, although she did guest spots in shows such as The Cosby Show and Touched by an Angel later in her career. She died in July 2020 of leukaemia aged 47.

== Episodes ==
No.	Title	Directed by	Written by	Original release date	U.S. viewers (millions)	Rating/share (households)
1	"Black Monday"	John Whitesell	Jane Anderson	November 5, 1988	9.9	6.8/12
After Bonnie abandons the family to "find herself," Donald and Miranda are left to make it on their own — and are besieged by well-meaning friends and co-workers offering comfort and casseroles.
2	"Grounded"	John Whitesell	Martha Williamson	November 12, 1988	8.6	6.0/10
After Miranda goes on a road trip without his permission, Donald grounds her for the first time — but neither of them is sure what being "grounded" means or how it works.
3	"Man in the Middle"	John Whitsell	Jule Selbo	November 19, 1988	9.8	6.8/12
When Miranda starts spending most of her time with Jack, Marcine feels left out, and wonders if her friendship with Miranda will survive.
4	"Miranda's Date"	James Widdoes	Martha Williamson	November 26, 1988	9.0	6.0/11
A boy from another school asks Miranda out on her first date. She accepts, but is terrified. Marcine tries to help by giving advice she has gleaned from teen romance novels, while Donald, who is happy that Miranda is beginning to date, tries to balance his excitement with the requisite parental concern for Miranda's well-being. Donald and the boy's father — a rude man who wants to make a business deal with Donald — agree to let the young couple go to a movie together, and the date ends on Miranda's front porch with her first big kiss.
5	"All Through the Night"	John Whitesell	Julia Newton	December 3, 1988	8.1	5.1/9
While Miranda is home sick with a high fever, she has strange dreams, including a hot dance number with Jack and an ironing nightmare.
6	"Home for the Holidays"	James Widdoes	Jane Anderson	December 10, 1988	8.4	5.5/10
Miranda and Donald try to spend Christmas away from home to avoid painful memories of spending the holidays with Bonnie, but a snowstorm changes their plans. They do their best to have a merry Christmas at home with the Hoodenpyles, but memories of Bonnie interfere.
7	"Marcine Shoplifts"	John Pasquin	Bob Colleary	December 31, 1988	7.9	5.6/11
Marcine gets caught shoplifting after an argument with her mother — and gets Miranda in trouble too.
8	"Russell's Broken Heart"	James Widdoes	Martha Williamson	Unaired	N/A	N/A
Russell announces his engagement, thrilling Miranda and stunning Donald.
9	"One Night Stand"	James Widdoes	Martha Williamson	Unaired	N/A	N/A

== Bibliography ==
- Tim Brooks and Earle Marsh, The Complete Directory to Prime Time Network and Cable TV Shows 1946–Present, Ninth edition (New York: Ballantine Books, 2007) ISBN 978-0-345-49773-4
