= Everything's Relative (1987 TV series) =

- Series premiere print advertisement
- Created by: Marshall Karp
- Starring: Jason Alexander; John Bolger; Gina Hecht; Tony Deacon Nittoli; Anne Jackson
- Composer: David Horowitz
- Country of origin: United States
- Original language: English
- No. of seasons: 1
- No. of episodes: 10 (4 unaired)

Production
- Executive producer: Maurice Duke
- Camera setup: Multi-camera
- Running time: 30 minutes
- Production companies: Fredde Productions; Embassy Communications

Original release
- Network: CBS
- Release: October 3 – November 7, 1987

Everything's Relative is an American sitcom starring Jason Alexander, John Bolger, Gina Hecht, Tony Deacon Nittoli and Anne Jackson which aired on CBS from October 3 to November 7, 1987.

== Summary ==
The series centered around the Beeby brothers – Julian (Alexander), a divorced, hard-working 33-year-old businessman and Scott (Bolger), a single 25-year-old womanizing construction worker – who shared a loft apartment in the SoHo section of lower Manhattan despite their different lifestyles, values, careers, and social lives. Despite Julian being the older of the two brothers, in reality, Alexander was 28 and Bolger was 33 respectively at the time.

Other characters included Emily Cabot (Hecht), Julian's business partner and friend; Mickey Murphy (Nittoli), a young man who ran errands for both brothers; and Rae (Jackson), the boys' meddling and opinionated mother.

== Episodes ==
No.	Title	Directed by	Written by	Original release date
1	"Meet the Brothers Beeby"	Ellen Falcon	Marshall Karp	October 3, 1987
Starring June Stein and Kim Morgan Greene
2	"Taking Stock"	Andrew D. Weyman	Alan Kirschenbaum	October 10, 1987
Starring Margaret Reed and A. Bobby Fields
3	"The Post Graduate"	John Bowab	Trish Vradenburg	October 17, 1987
Starring Nick Wyman and Cynthia Harris
4	"The Mom Who Came to Dinner"	Andrew D. Weyman	Marshall Karp	October 24, 1987
Starring Josie Bell, Dawn Ann Billings, Jamie Tirelli and Rob Morrow
5	"Hit the Road, Jack"	John Bowab	Marshall Karp	October 31, 1987
Starring Anne Lange, Jane White, Alan North and Peggy Cass
6	"It's a Business Doing Pleasure with You"	Valentine Mayer	Trish Vradenburg	November 7, 1987
Starring Anne Twomey and Rita Gardner
7	"Forgotten, But Not Gone"	Matthew Diamond	Larry Levin	Unaired
Starring Dan Frazer
8	"It Had to Be You and You"	Steven Robman	David Crane; Marta Kauffman	Unaired
Starring Mary D'Arcy
9	"Brother's Keeper"	David Trainer	Larry Levin	Unaired
Starring Ann McDonough and Dion Anderson
10	"Emily's Turn"	Valentine Mayer	Trish Vradenburg	Unaired
Starring Ronald Guttman
