= High Risk (TV series) =

- Genre: Reality television
- Country of origin: United States
- Original language: English
- No. of seasons: 1

Production
- Running time: 45 minutes

Original release
- Network: CBS
- Release: October 4 – October 4, 1988

High Risk is an American reality television series that premiered on CBS on October 4, 1988. The series features high-risk stunts and jobs such as United States Border Patrol agents, automobile repossessors, cave explorers, and roller coaster testers. The show was quickly put together for a two-year "union-breaker" commitment as a result of the 1988 Writers Guild of America strike. It received unanimous condemnations and was canceled after one night. CBS had to fill the time slot with specials until TV 101 was ready to air.
