= Family Man (American TV series) =

- Family Man opening title
- Genre: Sitcom
- Created by: Earl Pomerantz
- Starring: Richard Libertini; Mimi Kennedy; Alison Sweeney; Whitby Hertford; Keeley Mari Gallagher
- Theme music composer: Roger Steinman
- Opening theme: "Family Man" performed by Kipp Lennon
- Composer: Roger Steinman
- Country of origin: United States
- Original language: English
- No. of seasons: 1
- No. of episodes: 7

Production
- Camera setup: Videotape; Multi-camera
- Running time: 30 mins. (approx)
- Production companies: S.B.B Productions; Universal Television

Original release
- Network: ABC
- Release: March 18 – April 29, 1988

Family Man is an American sitcom which aired on ABC from March 18 to April 29, 1988. It starred Richard Libertini as a middle-aged comedy writer married to a much younger wife (Mimi Kennedy), and focused on the trials and tribulations he faced raising two stepchildren and one biological child. The series was created by Earl Pomerantz.

== Synopsis ==
Shelly Tobin (Libertini) was a balding, good-natured comedy writer in his fifties who found that his personal life provided just as much witty fodder as his professional. He had married later in life to his wife, Andrea (Kennedy), who was fifteen years his junior. Shelly had experienced instant fatherhood upon their union, with Andrea having brought in two kids from her previous marriage, the now-teenage Rosie (Alison Sweeney) and nine-year-old Josh (Whitby Hertford); eventually, Shelly and Andrea produced a child together, three-year-old Sara (Keeley Mari Gallagher). With children in all different age groups, with Rosie and Josh in their (respectively) adolescent and mischievous stages especially, Shelly continued to navigate through the basics of parenting the best he could. He faced the real challenges with a combination of bewilderment and intelligent humor as he tried to make sense of the process. Andrea provided the calm voice of reason, and despite her longer tenure as a parent, would continually remind Shelly that she, too, would still deal with the unknown.

== Production ==
The living room set was a reproduction of the Pomerantz's own living room in Pacific Palisades, California. The facade of the house in the show opening was that of his house and the backdrop of a view of the Pacific Ocean was based on the view from his home. Every story of the eleven episodes written was based on something that had happened to Pomerantz as a child or as an adult. Because Pomerantz wanted more than the usual 3 sets used for a multi-camera show with a live audience, the show was shot on seven sets as a multi-camera show but without a live audience. The program was titled "Our House" while it was under development but changed when NBC declined to pick it up. When interviewed on the Hollywood and Levine podcast in 2018 Pomerantz said that he had videotapes of the seven episodes that were produced stored in his garage but that he had no interest in seeing them digitized and shared.

== Cast ==
- Richard Libertini as Shelly Tobin
- Mimi Kennedy as Andrea Tobin
- Alison Sweeney as Rosie Tobin
- Whitby Hertford as Josh Tobin
- Keeley Mari Gallagher as Sara Tobin

== Episodes ==
No.	Title	Directed by	Written by	Original release date	Prod. code
1	"A Night Out"	David Steinberg	Earl Pomerantz	March 18, 1988	78201
2	"Dad"	Unknown	Unknown	March 25, 1988	78205
3	"Above the Fruited Plain"	Unknown	Unknown	April 1, 1988	78204
4	"Valentine's Day"	Unknown	Unknown	April 8, 1988	78203
5	"Hmmmm"	David Steinberg	Earl Pomerantz	April 15, 1988	78206
6	"Preferred List"	Unknown	Unknown	April 22, 1988	78208
7	"Weekend"	Unknown	Unknown	April 29, 1988	78202

== Broadcast ==
Family Man cast. Clockwise, from top left: Sweeney, Kennedy, Hertford, Gallagher and Libertini.

Family Man was a midseason replacement on ABC's Friday night lineup for the spring of 1988, airing at 9:30/8:30c following Mr. Belvedere. It was one of many ABC comedies that were either moved to, or tried out on, Friday nights during the 1987-88 TV season. It replaced The Thorns in the timeslot. With only seven episodes ordered, the series aired until April 29, 1988, and was not picked up for another season.
