= The Slap Maxwell Story =

- Created by: Jay Tarses
- Developed by: Bob Brush
- Starring: Dabney Coleman; Megan Gallagher
- Composer: Patrick Williams
- Country of origin: United States
- Original language: English
- No. of seasons: 1
- No. of episodes: 22

Production
- Camera setup: Multi-camera
- Running time: 30 minutes
- Production company: Slap Happy Productions

Original release
- Network: ABC
- Release: September 23, 1987 – June 8, 1988

The Slap Maxwell Story (sometimes seen in print as The "Slap" Maxwell Story) is an American sitcom broadcast by ABC as part of its 1987–88 lineup.

It starred Dabney Coleman as "Slap" Maxwell, an egocentric sportswriter for a newspaper called The Ledger, somewhere in the American Southwest. The Ledger is an old-fashioned newspaper, and Slap is an old-fashioned man, who composes his "Slap Shots" column on a typewriter. Despite the newly litigious environment of journalism, Slap insists on filling his column with rumor and innuendo, which draws lawsuits and frequently results in Slap's termination. After each termination, Slap makes groveling apologies and is rehired.

The title character's nickname comes from the fact that someone else always ends up hitting him in every episode.

Slap has an on-again, off-again relationship with Judy (Megan Gallagher), one of the paper's secretaries. The series also featured Annie (Susan Anspach) as Slap's ex-wife, who retains a soft spot for him.

The show was created by Jay Tarses, who in 1983 was co-creator of Buffalo Bill, an NBC sitcom in which Coleman starred as an off-putting talk show host.

== Cast ==
- Dabney Coleman as "Slap" Maxwell
- Megan Gallagher as Judy
- Brian Smiar as Nelson Kruger
- Bill Cobbs as The Dutchman
- Bill Calvert as Charlie Wilson
- Susan Anspach as Annie

== Bilbliography ==
- Tim Brooks and Earle Marsh, The Complete Directory to Prime Time Network and Cable TV Shows 1946–Present, Ninth edition (New York: Ballantine Books, 2007) ISBN 978-0-345-49773-4
