= Coming of Age (American TV series) =

- Genre: Sitcom
- Created by: Emily Marshall
- Written by: Miriam Trogdon; Michael Zinberg
- Directed by: James Gardner
- Starring: Paul Dooley; Phyllis Newman; Alan Young; Glynis Johns
- Theme music composer: Louis Prima
- Opening theme: "Sing, Sing, Sing" performed by Doc Severinsen
- Composer: Tim Truman
- Country of origin: United States
- Original language: English
- No. of seasons: 2
- No. of episodes: 15 (4 unaired)

Production
- Executive producer: Barry Kemp
- Camera setup: Multi-camera
- Running time: 30 minutes
- Production companies: Bungalow 78 Productions; Universal Television

Original release
- Network: CBS
- Release: March 15, 1988 – July 27, 1989

Coming of Age is an American sitcom that aired on CBS in the United States for two seasons from 1988 to 1989.

== Premise ==
Coming of Age features Paul Dooley and Phyllis Newman as Dick and Ginny Hale, who lived in a retirement community in Arizona. Dick resented his retirement – a former airline pilot, he had been forced to retire by a Federal Aviation Administration rule that requires all U.S. commercial pilots to retire by age 60. Dick hated almost everything about his retirement, including his surroundings. He was appalled by the hot climate, the thin walls separating the Hale's apartment from that of their neighbors (Alan Young and Glynis Johns), and mostly by the contented attitude of the other residents including Pauline Spencer (Ruta Lee). Kevin Pollak played Brian Brinker, who ran the community but was very inept at his job, with Lenore Woodward playing his elderly and very nosy secretary Wilma Salzgaber. Brinker would also be a love interest to Dick and Ginny's daughter, another wrinkle about The Dunes which raised the ire of Dick.

This program was first aired as a midseason replacement in March 1988. It was not well received and was pulled from the schedule after only three episodes were aired. Nevertheless, it was added to the CBS 1988 fall lineup. It failed again, and was quickly pulled from the schedule. The airing of more episodes in June and July 1989 was a "burn-off", an attempt to recoup at least some of the investment in the show by using it as filler during the traditionally low-rated summer months.

== Cast ==
- Paul Dooley as Dick Hale
- Phyllis Newman as Ginny Hale
- Alan Young as Ed Pepper
- Glynis Johns as Trudie Pepper
- Kevin Pollak as Brian Brinker
- Lenore Woodward as Wilma Salzgaber
- Ruta Lee as Pauline Spencer

== Episodes ==
=== Series overview ===
Season	Episodes	Originally released	
Season	Episodes	First released	Last released
1	3	March 15, 1988	March 29, 1988
2	12	October 24, 1988	July 27, 1989

=== Season 1 (1988) ===
No. overall	No. in season	Title	Directed by	Written by	Original release date	Prod. code	Rating/share (households)
1	1	"Pilot"	Tony Mordente	Emily Marshall	March 15, 1988	63601	11.0/17
Dick and Ginny, due to Dick's forced retirement from the Federal Aviation Administration, settle in to the retirement community The Dunes, and meet all the new inhabitants, despite Dick's constant consternation.
2	2	"The Sopwith Pup"	Unknown	Unknown	March 22, 1988	63604	7.6/12
3	3	"The Kids Are Coming, The Kids Are Coming"	Unknown	Unknown	March 29, 1988	63610	10.1/16

=== Season 2 (1988–89) ===
No. overall	No. in season	Title	Directed by	Written by	Original release date	Prod. code	U.S. viewers (millions)	Rating/share (households)
4	1	"All I Wanted Was a New Car: Part 1"	Michael Zinberg	Sheldon Bull	October 24, 1988	64601	15.9	11.6/17
Dick is unable to get a loan towards the purchase of a new car because he's considered in an untrustworthy category due to being retired, so he gets a part-time job. Meanwhile, Ed, Trudie, and Ginny decide to compete in a square dancing competition.
5	2	"All I Wanted Was a New Car: Part 2"	Unknown	Unknown	October 31, 1988	64602	16.0	11.7/18
6	3	"Hale to the Chief"	Tony Mordente	Jeffrey Duteil	November 14, 1988	63603	14.9	11.5/17
Dick campaigns to get cable installed at The Dunes after him and Ed's attempts to install a satellite dish are futile. Bob and Ray (in their final appearance as a duo) guest star as a bullying elderly brother duo who get in the way of Dick and use underhanded tactics to intimidate the rest of the inhabitants of The Dunes.
7	4	"Cindy Flies the Coop"	Unknown	Unknown	November 21, 1988	64603	13.3	9.6/14
8	5	"Todd is My Co-Pilot"	Unknown	Unknown	June 29, 1989	64606	7.4	5.6/10
9	6	"A Wife in the Theatre"	Unknown	Unknown	July 6, 1989	64607	7.4	5.5/10
10	7	"Pauline et Rouge"	James Gardner	Sheldon Bull & Emily Marshall	July 20, 1989	63608	7.4	5.4/10
Ed's brother, Red (Van Johnson), visits The Dunes and gets romantically involved with Pauline.
11	8	"Boy Meets Girl"	Unknown	Unknown	July 27, 1989	64604	8.3	6.2/11
12	9	"Fever"	N/A	N/A	Unaired	63609	N/A	N/A
13	10	"Christmas at the Dunes"	N/A	N/A	Unaired	64608	N/A	N/A
Dick and Ginny celebrate Christmas, the one holiday that Dick loves so much that it puts him in a happy enough mood to tolerate everyone at The Dunes. Their daughter and grandkids make plans to visit Dick and Ginny for the holidays, but for Dick nothing goes exactly as planned.
14	11	"Daddy's Girl"	N/A	N/A	Unaired	64610	N/A	N/A
15	12	"Dick's Back"	N/A	N/A	Unaired	64611	N/A	N/A
