= First Impressions (TV series) =

American sitcom

- Genre: Sitcom
- Created by: Lawrence J. Cohen; Fred Freeman
- Starring: Brad Garrett; Thom Sharp; Brandy Gold; James Noble; Ruth Kobart
- Theme music composer: Harry Nilsson
- Country of origin: United States
- Original language: English
- No. of seasons: 1
- No. of episodes: 8 (3 unaired)

Production
- Running time: 30 minutes

Original release
- Network: CBS
- Release: August 27 – October 1, 1988

First Impressions is an American sitcom that aired on CBS from August 27, 1988 to October 1, 1988.

== Overview ==
Brad Garrett stars as Frank Dutton, the owner of an advertising agency in Omaha, Nebraska who does impressions to sell his commercials. The show also focuses on Frank's social life as a divorcée starting to date again, and as a father to his nine-year-old daughter, Lindsay.

Eight episodes were filmed, but due to the show accumulating low ratings, the show was cancelled by CBS after airing the first five.

== Cast ==
- Brad Garrett as Frank Dutton
- Thom Sharp as Dave Poole
- Brandy Gold as Lindsay Dutton
- Sarah Abrell as Donna Patterson
- James Noble as Raymond Voss
- Ruth Kobart as Mrs. Madison

== Episodes ==
No.	Title	Directed by	Written by	Original release date	U.S. viewers (millions)
1	"Pilot"	Terry Hughes & Phil Ramuno	Unknown	August 27, 1988	7.4
2	"Frank's Date"	Alan Rafkin	Unknown	September 3, 1988	6.0
3	"Raymond vs. the Computer"	Howard Storm	Lawrence J. Cohen & Fred Freeman	September 10, 1988	6.8
4	"The Public Trust"	Phil Ramuno	Unknown	September 24, 1988	6.5
5	"On His Own"	Jack Shea	Unknown	October 1, 1988	7.2
6	"Poor Clara"	N/A	N/A	Unaired	N/A
7	"The Audition"	N/A	N/A	Unaired	N/A
8	"The Selling of Frank"	N/A	N/A	Unaired	N/A
