= The Oldest Rookie =

American crime drama television series

- Created by: Gil Grant; Richard Chapman
- Starring: Paul Sorvino; D. W. Moffett; Raymond J. Barry; Marshall Bell
- Composer: Steve Dorff
- Country of origin: United States
- Original language: English
- No. of seasons: 1
- No. of episodes: 14

Production
- Running time: 60 minutes
- Production companies: Gil Grant Productions; Chapman Productions; Touchstone Television

Original release
- Network: CBS
- Release: September 16, 1987 – January 13, 1988

The Oldest Rookie is an American crime drama that aired from September 16, 1987, until January 13, 1988.

== Premise ==
A police veteran with a desk job wants to become a street cop again, this means he will get assigned a rookie partner.

== Cast ==
- Paul Sorvino as Officer Ike Porter
- D. W. Moffett as Detective Tony Jonas
- Raymond J. Barry as Lieutenant Marco Zaga
- Marshall Bell as Detective Gordon Lane
- Patrick Cronin as Chief Black

== Episodes ==
No.	Title	Directed by	Written by	Original release date
1	"Pilot (a.k.a. At the End of the Long Arm is a Glad Hand)"	Donald Petrie	Gil Grant	September 16, 1987
Porter and Jonas investigate a murder, against the wishes of their boss.
2	"A Game Effort"	Harry Harris	Tom Chehak	September 23, 1987
A friend of Ike is dead following a mugging. Porter and Jonas is assigned to a group of Korean athletes preparing for the 1988 Seoul Olympics.
3	"Heartbreakers"	Ric Rondell	Bill Luetscher	September 30, 1987
Ike gets a visit from her niece who becomes a witness to a mugging.
4	"The Cereal Killer"	Vincent McEveety	Daniel Freudenberger	October 7, 1987
Ike and Tony looks for a killer who only kills at breakfast. A psychic starts having visions about the murders.
5	"Blue Flu"	Kim Manners	Steve Johnson	October 14, 1987
Tony arrests a friend for murder.
6	"Coming from Behind"	Ric Rondell	Elliot Stern	October 21, 1987
Ike and Tony gets paired with two female detectives after they botch a homicide case.
7	"Grand Theft Avocado"	Allen Reisner	Jo & Thomas Perry	October 28, 1987
A rich developer is suspected of murder.
8	"Expert Witness"	Harry Harris & Donald Petrie	Daniel Freudenberger	November 4, 1987
A secretary starts receiving anonymous threats. Lane prepares Ike to be an expert witness.
9	"Ike and Son"	Frank P. Flynn	Tom Chehak	November 11, 1987
Porter and Jonas go undercover as father and son in order to catch thieves at a pawn shop.
10	"An Internal Affairs Affair"	Paul Krasny	Larry Nesbitt	November 25, 1987
Zaga's daughter asks Ike and Tony for help, when Zaga is arrested for being a coke dealer.
11	"Come Fly with Me"	Ric Rondell	Gil Grant & Richard Chapman	December 16, 1987
Ike's ex-wife wants him to save her second marriage. Ike and Tony discover a gang of drug smugglers.
12	"Best Men"	Judith Vogelsang	Tom Chehak	December 23, 1987
Ike and Tony investigate a perfume laboratory where a new scent causes amnesia.
13	"Yessir, That's My Baby"	Frank P. Flynn	Richard Chapman & Gil Grant	January 6, 1988
Tony's ex-girlfriend leaves her baby with him.
14	"Luck, Be a Lady"	Roger Duchowny	Gil Grant & Richard Chapman	January 13, 1988
Ike and Tony is in danger of suspension when they let a suspect loose.
