= The Thorns (TV series) =

American sitcom

- Created by: Allan Leicht
- Starring: Tony Roberts; Kelly Bishop; Marilyn Cooper; Mary Louise Wilson; Lori Petty; Adam Biesk; Lisa Rieffel; Jesse Tendler
- Opening theme: "We're All Right", by John Kander & Fred Ebb, performed by Dorothy Loudon
- Country of origin: United States
- Original language: English
- No. of seasons: 1
- No. of episodes: 12 (5 unaired) (list of episodes)

Production
- Camera setup: Multi-camera
- Running time: 30 minutes
- Production company: Reeves Entertainment Group

Original release
- Network: ABC
- Release: January 15 – March 11, 1988

The Thorns is an American sitcom that originally aired on ABC from January 15 to March 11, 1988.

== Premise ==
The Thorns are a dysfunctional married couple trying to climb their way up the social ladder in New York while dealing with their children and a grandmother moving in.

== Cast ==
=== Main ===
- Tony Roberts as Sloan Thorn
- Kelly Bishop as Ginger Thorn
- Marilyn Cooper as Rose Thorn
- Mary Louise Wilson as Toinette
- Lori Petty as Cricket
- Adam Biesk as Chad Thorn
- Lisa Rieffel as Joey Thorn
- Jesse Tendler as Edmund Thorn

=== Recurring ===
- Maureen Stapleton as Mrs. Hamilton
- Kathreen Marcopulos as Katina Pappas

== Episodes ==
No.	Title	Directed by	Written by	Original release date
1	"Death and Transfiguration"	John Bowab	Unknown	January 15, 1988
The Thorns' 6-year-old son reacts badly to the death of his dog. Sloan's mother moves in after her apartment burns down.
2	"Nothing Happened"	J.D. Lobue	Unknown	January 22, 1988
Chad would rather go out on a date than go on a trip with his father.
3	"The Girlfriend"	Valentine Mayer	Unknown	January 29, 1988
Chad falls in love with Katina, but his parents are trying to evict her parents.
4	"Condolence Call"	Valentine Mayer	Unknown	February 5, 1988
A friend of Tony dies.
5	"The Maid"	Valentine Mayer	Unknown	February 12, 1988
6	"The Other Maid"	Peter Bonerz	Alan Kirschenbaum	March 4, 1988
Peggy's true identity is discovered.
7	"The Thief"	Peter Bonerz	Unknown	March 11, 1988
Someone has stolen Edmund's bookbag.
8	"The First Date (or The Extended Family)"	Valentine Mayer	N/A	Unaired
Ginger wants her uncle to go out on a date with Mrs. Hamilton.
9	"The Rage"	Peter Bonerz	N/A	Unaired
The Thorns want to become more friendly, so they try psychotherapy.
10	"The Horse"	Peter Bonerz	N/A	Unaired
11	"The Prodigal Son"	Peter Bonerz	N/A	Unaired
12	"Dream House"	Peter Bonerz	N/A	Unaired
