= Just in Time (TV series) =

- Created by: Fred Barron
- Starring: Tim Matheson; Patricia Kalember; Alan Blumenfeld
- Composer: Lee Holdridge
- Country of origin: United States
- Original language: English
- No. of seasons: 1
- No. of episodes: 6

Production
- Executive producers: Fred Barron; Tim Matheson
- Camera setup: Single-camera
- Running time: 30 minutes
- Production companies: Tim Matheson Productions; Fat Dog Productions; Warner Bros. Television

Original release
- Network: ABC
- Release: April 6 – May 11, 1988

Just in Time is an American sitcom that aired on ABC from April 6 until May 11, 1988. Tim Matheson, who plays the lead character, was also the show's producer.

== Premise ==
Harry Stadlin (Tim Matheson) is the new editor of West Coast Review, a magazine in California. Episodes explore the complicated personal and professional lives of the magazine's eccentric staff.

== Cast ==
- Tim Matheson as Harry Stadlin
- Patricia Kalember as Joanna Farrell
- Alan Blumenfeld as Steven Birnbaum
- Kevin Scannell as Jack Manning
- Nada Despotovich as Isabel Miller
- Ronnie Claire Edwards as Carly Hightower
- Patrick Breen as Nick Thompson

== Episodes ==
No.	Title	Directed by	Written by	Original release date
1	"Nothing Sacred"	Peter Sasdy	Fred Barron	April 6, 1988
Joanna writes an article about Harry's personal life.
2	"All the Editor's Men"	Mimi Leder	John Wells	April 13, 1988
Joanna's boyfriend tries to get her to switch magazines.
3	"2 Rms, No Vu"	Barnet Kellman	Wendy Goldman and Judy Toll	April 20, 1988
Steven admits to being a sensitive man. Harry moves into Joanna's building.
4	"Mixed Doubles"	Barnet Kellman	Fred Barron and Alan Mandel	April 27, 1988
Harry and a hot tennis star go on a double date with Joanna and her boyfriend.
5	"The Boys in the Boardroom"	Unknown	Unknown	May 4, 1988
Harry plays golf with a financial adviser who wants to sink the magazine.
6	"Unnatural Phenomena, Supernatural Acts"	Tom Cherones	Wendy Goldman	May 11, 1988
Harry and Joanna are in the running for the same award.
