= Blue Skies (1988 TV series) =

American drama television series

- Genre: Drama
- Created by: Carol Evan McKeand; Nigel Evan McKeand
- Starring: Tom Wopat; Season Hubley; Kim Hauser
- Composers: Joel McNeely; Angela Morley
- Country of origin: United States
- Original language: English
- No. of seasons: 1
- No. of episodes: 8 (list of episodes)

Production
- Running time: 60 minutes
- Production companies: McKeand Productions; CBS Entertainment Productions

Original release
- Network: CBS
- Release: June 13 – August 1, 1988

Blue Skies is an American drama television series created by Carol and Nigel Evan McKeand, that aired on CBS from June 13 until August 1, 1988.

== Premise ==
A divorced ad executive moves to Oregon with his new wife and blended family to run a sawmill.

== Cast ==
- Tom Wopat as Frank Cobb
- Season Hubley as Annie Pfeiffer Cobb
- Kim Hauser as Zoe Pfeiffer
- Alyson Croft as Sarah Cobb
- Danny Gerard as Charley Cobb
- Pat Hingle as Henry Cobb
- Lois Foraker as Claire Ordway

== Episodes ==
No.	Title	Directed by	Written by	Original release date
1	"A Bend in the River"	Lee Philips	Carol Evan McKeand and Nigel Evan McKeand	June 13, 1988
12-year-old Sarah has a problem with her new blended family. Frank wants his father involved with the sawmill.
2	"I am the Moon"	Gwen Arner	Linda Salzman	June 20, 1988
Charley becomes friends with a Vietnam War veteran. Sarah thinks Zoe invades her privacy.
3	"The Visitor"	Ralph Senensky	Peter Orton	June 27, 1988
Sarah hits it off with a friend of Anne and Sophie. A pilot comes for a visit.
4	"Something Old, Something New"	Peter Crane	John Gray	July 4, 1988
Frank is the last to find out that Henry has got engaged. Sarah has a crush on a guy who loves someone else.
5	"White Horse"	Alexander Singer	Ann Hamilton	July 11, 1988
Zoe pulls a prank. Henry and Frank has an argument.
6	"Fathers"	Bill Duke	Valerie West	July 18, 1988
Zoe's biological father comes for a visit and he wants her to come with him on the trip back to New York City.
7	"Written in the Stars"	Charlie Correll	Linda Salzman	July 25, 1988
Annie finds out that her elder sibling has a drinking problem.
8	"Changes"	Peter Crane	John Gray and Linda Salzman	August 1, 1988
Annie reveals that she is pregnant.
