= The Reporters (1988 TV program) =

American newsmagazine television program aired on Fox (1988–1990)

The Reporters is an American newsmagazine television program that aired on Fox from July 30, 1988 to March 31, 1990.

== Format ==
The Reporters was structured much in the style of the syndicated program A Current Affair, except that there was no regular "host" role. As A Current Affair was produced for syndication by Fox, there was a considerable overlap in subject matter and some reporters even appeared on both programs.

Some segments from the program have since been seen in the present day in a historical context on Fox News as part of their compilation series, From the Fox Files.
