= Trial and Error (TV series) =

- Created by: Don Seigel; Jerry Perzigian
- Starring: Paul Rodriguez; Eddie Velez
- Composer: Ray Colcord
- Country of origin: United States
- Original language: English
- No. of seasons: 1
- No. of episodes: 8 (5 unaired)

Production
- Executive producers: Donald L. Seigel; Jerry Perzigian; Howard Brown; Tommy Chong
- Producer: Al Aidekman
- Camera setup: Multi-camera
- Running time: 30 minutes
- Production companies: ELP Communications; Columbia Pictures Television

Original release
- Network: CBS
- Release: March 15 – March 29, 1988

Eddie Velez (left) as John Hernandez and Paul Rodriguez as Tony Rivera in the opening credits for Trial and Error.

Trial and Error is an American sitcom that was broadcast on CBS from March 15 to March 29, 1988. It was canceled after the third episode, leaving the remaining five episodes unaired.

== Development ==
Trial and Error evolved from a pilot entitled The Family Martinez created by comedian Tommy Chong, about a reformed Latino gang member who became a trial lawyer and moved back in with his family in East Los Angeles, California. CBS liked the concept, but wanted to change it from a family sitcom to a buddy comedy, and it was subsequently reworked as Amigos by Don Seigel and Jerry Perzigian. Chong remained on board as a producer, but "never showed up" to any of the writing sessions. Paul Rodriguez objected to the title Amigos, saying it was too stereotypical, and the title was changed to Trial and Error.

Brad Pitt was cast as the bellboy in the second episode, written by Steven Kunes, entitled "Bon Appetit." According to executive producer Jerry Perzigian, this was Pitt's first paid Hollywood job. Pitt had arrived from Springfield, Missouri, only three days before the shoot, which took place on November 17, 1987. The episode aired on CBS on March 22, 1988.

== Premise ==
The series is about two Latino roommates – John Hernandez and Tony Rivera – living in Los Angeles. John is an attorney and Tony is a T-shirt salesman.

== Cast ==
- Eddie Velez as John Hernandez
- Paul Rodriguez as Tony Rivera
- John de Lancie as Bob Adams
- Debbie Shapiro as Rhonda
- Stephen Elliott as Edmund Kittie
- Susan Saldivar as Lisa

== Episodes ==
No.	Title	Directed by	Written by	Original release date
1	"Pilot"	Andrew D. Weyman	Unknown	March 15, 1988
John has an embarrassing first day at a prestigious law firm.
2	"Bon Appetit"	Andrew D. Weyman	Steven Kunes	March 22, 1988
John invites his boss over for dinner. Guest star: Brad Pitt as the bellboy.
3	"Man's Best Friend"	Andrew D. Weyman	Al Aidekman	March 29, 1988
Tony wants John to testify against the canine movie star that bit him.
4	"Deride and Conquer"	Andrew D. Weyman	N/A	Unaired
5	"Ring of Truth"	Andrew D. Weyman	N/A	Unaired
6	"Casino Night"	Andrew D. Weyman	N/A	Unaired
7	"Strike Three, You're Out"	Andrew D. Weyman	N/A	Unaired
8	"Born to Squirm"	Andrew D. Weyman	N/A	Unaired
