= The Cavanaughs (TV series) =

American TV series (1986–1989)

- Genre: Sitcom
- Created by: Robert Moloney
- Starring: Barnard Hughes; Christine Ebersole; Peter Michael Goetz; Mary Tanner Bailey; Danny Cooksey; John Short; Parker Jacobs
- Composers: Paul Pilger; Dennis Polen; William Moloney
- Country of origin: United States
- Original language: English
- No. of seasons: 2
- No. of episodes: 26

Production
- Executive producers: Leonard Goldberg; Robert Moloney
- Producer: Seth Pearlman
- Running time: 30 minutes
- Production companies: Mandy Films; Paramount Television

Original release
- Network: CBS
- Release: December 1, 1986 – July 27, 1989

The Cavanaughs is an American sitcom that aired on CBS from December 1, 1986, to July 27, 1989.

The series revolved around Francis "Pop" Cavanaugh, a 71-year-old, blue-collar Irish Catholic man living in South Boston with his daughter Kit and son Chuck, as well as Chuck's sons (one of whom was a Catholic priest) and daughter. Much of the show's humor stemmed from conflicts between the cantankerous, opinionated Pop and his grown children.

After airing during the 1986–87 television season, the show went on hiatus and returned in the summer of 1988.

== Cast ==
- Barnard Hughes as Francis "Pop" Cavanaugh
- Christine Ebersole as Kit Cavanaugh
- Peter Michael Goetz as Chuck Cavanaugh
- John Short as Father Chuck Cavanaugh, Jr.
- Mary Tanner Bailey as Mary Margaret Cavanaugh
- Parker Jacobs as John Cavanaugh
- Danny Cooksey as Kevin Cavanaugh
- Art Carney appeared in three episodes as Pop's younger brother, Jimmy "The Weasel" Cavanaugh.

== Episodes ==
=== Series overview ===
| Season | Episodes | Originally released | |
| Season | Episodes | First released | Last released |
|---|---|---|---|
| 1 | 13 | December 1, 1986 | March 9, 1987 |
| 2 | 13 | August 8, 1988 | July 27, 1989 |

=== Season 1 (1986–87) ===
| No. overall | No. in season | Title | Directed by | Written by | Original release date | Rating/share (households) |
|---|---|---|---|---|---|---|
| 1 | 1 | "Member of the Wake-ing" | Unknown | Unknown | December 1, 1986 | 19.9/29 |
| 2 | 2 | "Not So Gently Into the Night" | Unknown | Unknown | December 8, 1986 | 16.4/24 |
| 3 | 3 | "Love with an Improper Stranger" | Unknown | Unknown | December 15, 1986 | 17.8/26 |
| 4 | 4 | "Yes, Virginia, There Is a Pop" | Unknown | Unknown | December 22, 1986 | 14.2/21 |
| 5 | 5 | "The Bishop's Back" | Unknown | Unknown | December 29, 1986 | 14.9/24 |
| 6 | 6 | "Angst a Lot" | Unknown | Unknown | January 12, 1987 | 16.9/25 |
| 7 | 7 | "Strike Too" | Unknown | Unknown | January 19, 1987 | 17.8/25 |
| 8 | 8 | "The Arrangement" | Unknown | Unknown | January 26, 1987 | 17.1/24 |
| 9 | 9 | "The Eyes Have Had It" | Unknown | Unknown | February 2, 1987 | 17.4/26 |
| 10 | 10 | "A Chorus Malign" | Unknown | Unknown | February 9, 1987 | 14.4/21 |
| 11 | 11 | "Banned in Boston" | Unknown | Unknown | February 16, 1987 | 15.0/21 |
| 12 | 12 | "He Ain't Heavy, Father..." | John Pasquin | Robert Moloney | February 23, 1987 | 15.8/24 |
| 13 | 13 | "Aunt Mom" | Unknown | Unknown | March 9, 1987 | 13.5/19 |

=== Season 2 (1988–89) ===
| No. overall | No. in season | Title | Directed by | Written by | Original release date | U.S. viewers (millions) | Rating/share (households) |
|---|---|---|---|---|---|---|---|
| 14 | 1 | "Weasel Waltz" | Unknown | Unknown | August 8, 1988 | 9.4 | 7.5/14 |
| 15 | 2 | "Coastal Disturbance" | Unknown | Unknown | August 15, 1988 | 7.7 | 5.8/11 |
| 16 | 3 | "Careers" | Unknown | Unknown | August 22, 1988 | 10.2 | 8.0/14 |
| 17 | 4 | "Monk's the Word" | Unknown | Unknown | August 29, 1988 | 14.0 | 10.6/18 |
| 18 | 5 | "Suggestive Dancing" | Unknown | Unknown | September 5, 1988 | 13.3 | 9.5/16 |
| 19 | 6 | "Many Happy Returns" | Unknown | Unknown | September 12, 1988 | 13.0 | 9.7/16 |
| 20 | 7 | "Smoke Gets in Your Eyes and Up Your Nose" | Unknown | Unknown | September 19, 1988 | 16.9 | 12.3/19 |
| 21 | 8 | "Strange Bedfellows" | Unknown | Unknown | September 26, 1988 | 15.1 | 11.2/17 |
| 22 | 9 | "Gimme Shelter" | Andrew D. Weyman | Mark Masuoka | October 3, 1988 | 10.7 | 7.9/12 |
| 23 | 10 | "Fair Weather Friend" | Unknown | Unknown | June 29, 1989 | 7.7 | 5.8/11 |
| 24 | 11 | "The Last Temptation of Chuck" | Unknown | Unknown | July 6, 1989 | 8.3 | 6.1/11 |
| 25 | 12 | "The Cavanaugh Curse" | Unknown | Unknown | July 20, 1989 | 7.5 | 5.6/10 |
| 26 | 13 | "Just Weaseled" | Unknown | Unknown | July 27, 1989 | 9.4 | 6.9/13 |
