= A Picture of You =

A Picture of You may refer to:

- A Picture of You (film), a 2014 American drama film
- "A Picture of You" (Joe Brown song), 1962
- A Picture of You, a 2013 album by Daniel O'Donnell, or its title track
- A Picture of You, a 1981 album by Alvin Stardust, or its title track
- "A Picture of You", a song performed by country music singer Charlie Rich on the 1969 album The Fabulous Charlie Rich
- "A Picture of You", a song performed by Rick Wakeman on the 1971 album Piano Vibrations
- "A Picture of You", a 1991 song by Great Plains on the eponymous debut album Great Plains
- "A Picture of You", a song performed by Johnny Reid on the 2015 album What Love Is All About

== See also ==
- Picture of You (disambiguation)
- Pictures of You (disambiguation)
