= Kiel Martin =

American actor (1944–1990)

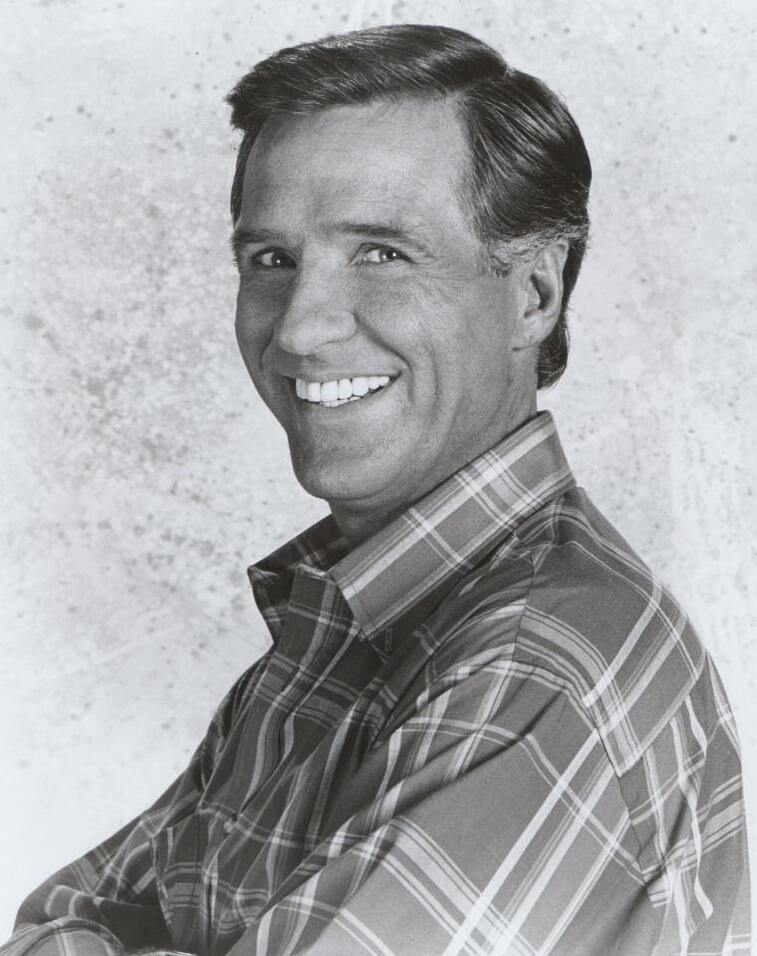
- Martin as Charles Russell on Second Chance, c. 1987
- Born: Kiel Urban Mueller; July 26, 1944; Pittsburgh, Pennsylvania, U.S.
- Died: December 28, 1990 (aged 46); Rancho Mirage, California, U.S.
- Occupation: Actor
- Years active: 1960–1990
- Spouses: Claudia Martin (m. 1969; div. 1971) Christina Montoya (m. 1978; div. 1980) Joanne La Pomaroa (m. 1982; div. 1984)
- Children: 1 (with Claudia Martin)

Kiel Urban Mueller (July 26, 1944 – December 28, 1990), known professionally as Kiel Martin, was an American actor best known for his role as Detective John "J. D." LaRue on the 1980s television police drama Hill Street Blues.

== Early years ==
Martin was born in Pittsburgh, Pennsylvania, and raised in the city of Hialeah, Florida, in Miami-Dade County. He was named after the city of Kiel, Germany, in honor of his family's German ancestry.

A 1962 graduate of Hialeah High School, Martin considered dropping out when he reached the age of 16. To prevent this, his father arranged for him to audition for a minor role in the school's production of the musical Finian's Rainbow. Martin was instead offered the lead. When he was 18, he made $90 a day dubbing voices for "Mexican fairy-tale movies imported by K. Gordon Murray."

Martin briefly served in the Army, where he played the leading role of Alan Baker in a production of Neil Simon's Come Blow Your Horn. He was discharged in 1964. He was then a drama student at Miami-Dade Junior College, the University of Miami, and Trinity University in San Antonio, Texas, later saying, "I went to whatever college that was doing a play I wanted to be in. And I left whenever they ran out of plays. I was not a serious college-goer."

== Career ==
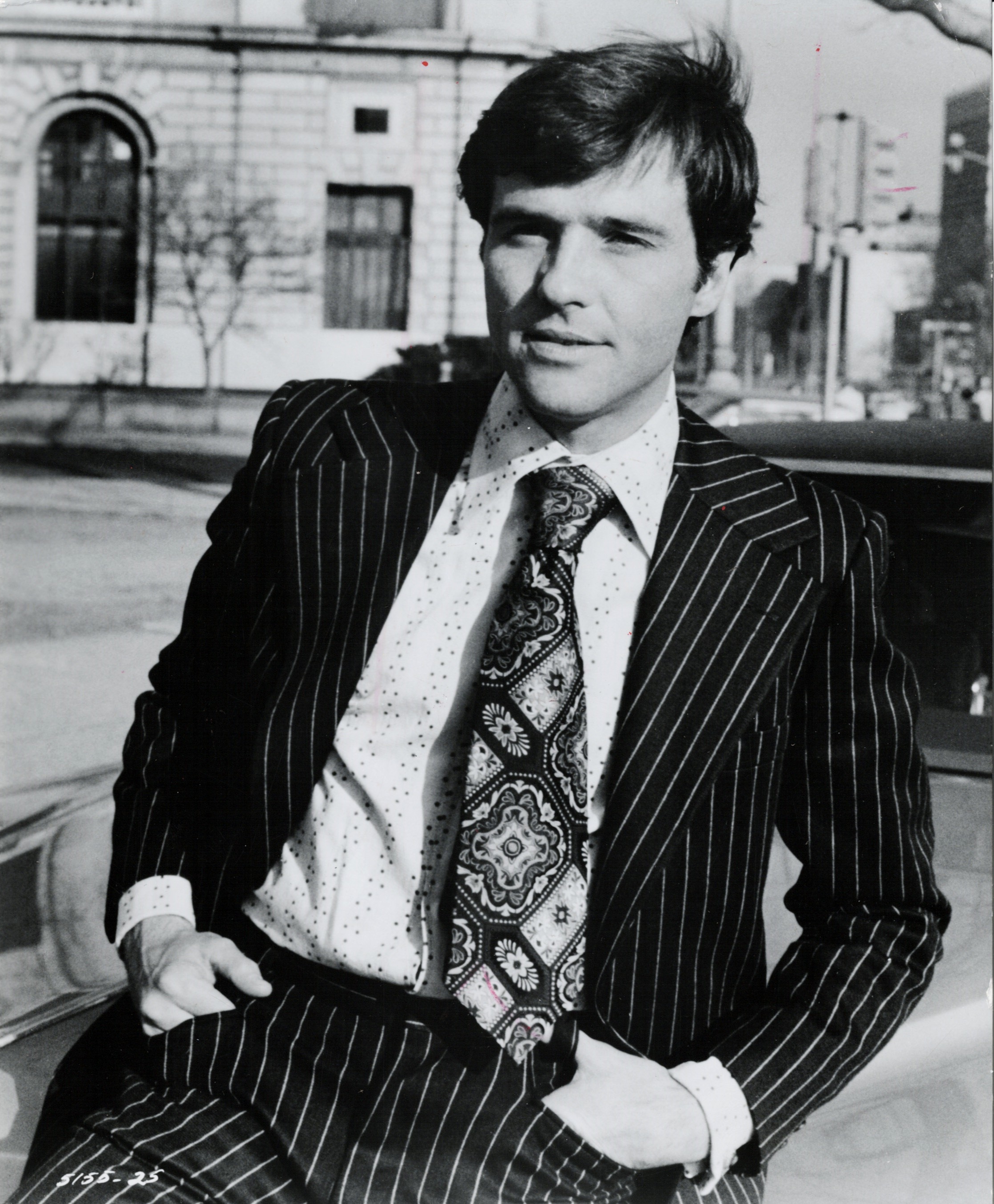
Martin as White Folks in Trick Baby

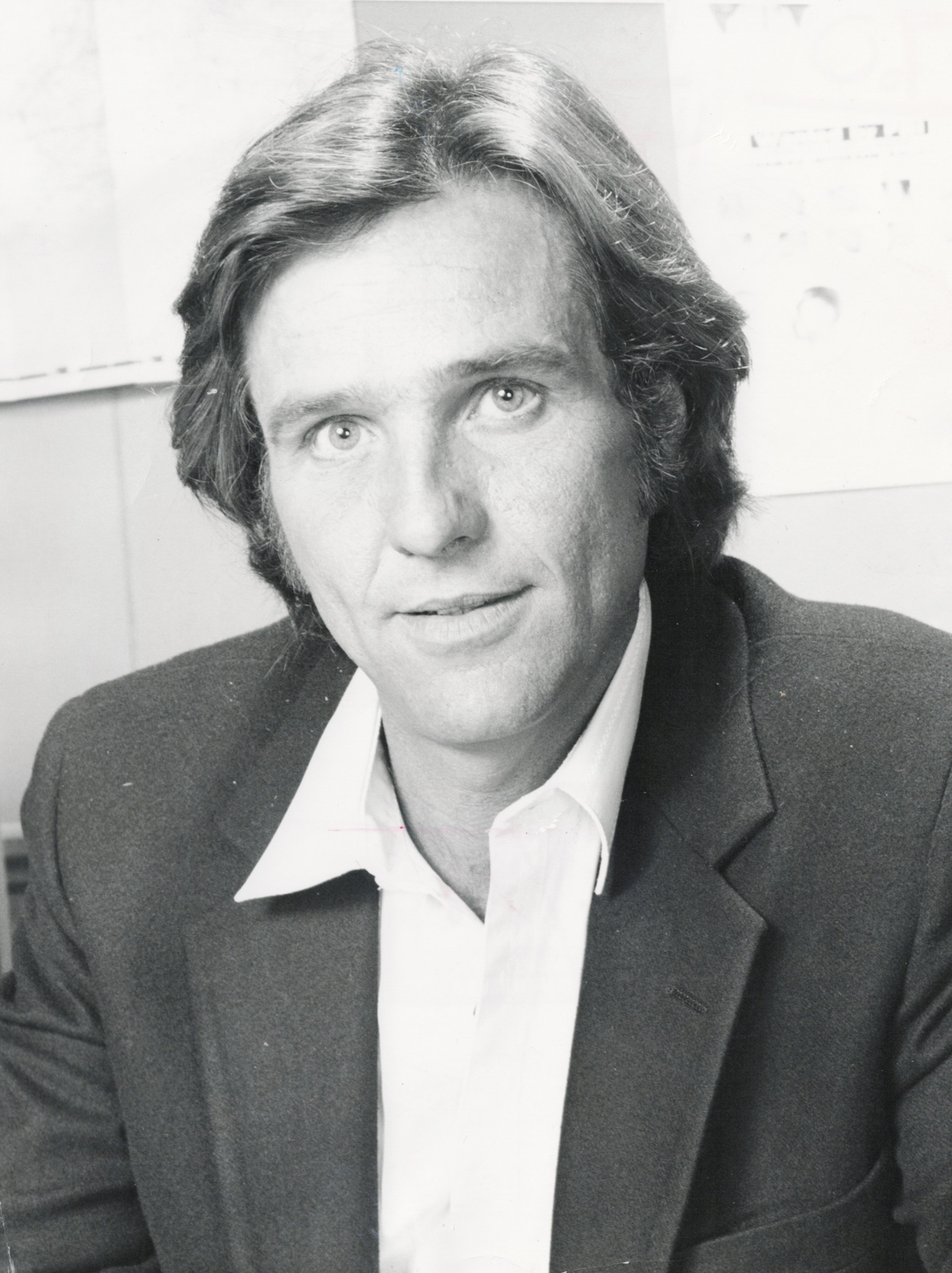
Martin as J. D. LaRue on Hill Street Blues

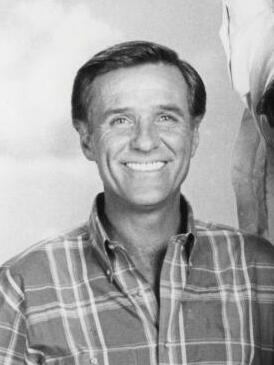
Martin as Charles Russell on Second Chance

Martin's debut as a professional actor came in repertory theatre in Florida. After an attempt at stand-up comedy in Miami, he learned to play the guitar, working for two years in New York as a musician and a dockworker. He also performed with the National Shakespeare Company at San Diego's Old Globe Theatre and worked as a repertory actor in New York and New Orleans before becoming a client of the William Morris Agency.

In 1967, Martin was signed as a contract player at Universal Studios after being recommended by June Havoc, who saw him perform when they were both working at the New Orleans Repertory Company. However, in August of that year, he broke 15 bones in a motorcycle accident after crashing into an oak tree. He spent four days in a coma and required two years of recuperation, during which he lost 40 pounds.

Following his recovery, Martin starred as the title character in the Blaxploitation film Trick Baby (1972) based on the novel by Iceberg Slim. He appeared in The Panic in Needle Park (1971) featuring Al Pacino and Lolly-Madonna XXX (1973) along with a young Jeff Bridges. He also costarred in the 1975 film Moonrunners, which was the basis for the television series The Dukes of Hazzard. He was, with Jon Voight and Michael Sarrazin, among the final three actors considered for the role of Joe Buck in Midnight Cowboy.

Martin made guest appearances on various television shows throughout the late 1960s and the 1970s, including Dragnet, Ironside, The Virginian, and Gunsmoke. He was also a regular on the soap opera The Edge of Night, playing the part of Raney Cooper. He considered himself to have been typecast as a villain, saying that Hill Street Blues "was the first time in my career I played a part where I wasn't some terrible creep. I'd killed every goddamned thing in America, including nuns and babies. I did soap for a year and a half, and I axed five people because their contracts were up."

Martin was also cast in roles that required his musical skills. He wrote and performed the song "Not for Long" for the 1972 made-for-TV movie The Catcher, also co-writing the film's title track with Jackie DeShannon, who sang it. He had earlier sung the blues song "Alberta" on The Virginian and Tom Paxton's "I'm Bound for the Mountains and the Sea" for the soundtrack of Then Came Bronson, accompanying himself on acoustic guitar. His Moonrunners character Bobby Lee Hagg is also a guitar player.

=== Hill Street Blues ===
In 1980, Martin was cast in his most famous role as Detective John "J. D." LaRue, a skilled yet morally questionable plainclothes detective whom he played on all seven seasons of the police procedural Hill Street Blues (1980–1987). Martin had earlier come to the attention of Steven Bochco, co-creator of Hill Street with Michael Kozoll. Martin had guest-starred on Bochco's The Bold Ones: The New Doctors and two of Bochco's earlier and short-lived police shows, Delvecchio and Paris, along with many other future Hill Street Blues regulars. To prepare for the role, Martin rode the "Skid Row Beat" with cops in Los Angeles, and he later visited and honored officers injured in the line of duty or with a terminal illness. In 1985, he was made an honorary detective sergeant by the Macon, Georgia police department.

Martin described LaRue as "a total opportunist, totally impetuous and quite unrealistic in his attitude toward advancement and success. But he's a very good cop, which is something that not many people mention." Though LaRue boasts of "two medals of valor, three citations for bravery" and "a higher arrest tally than any clown in this room," his many vices often threaten to derail his police career. In the final episodes of the first season, "Rites of Spring" and "Jungle Madness," each two hours long, Hill Street precinct captain Frank Furillo (Daniel J. Travanti) gives LaRue an ultimatum to either face his drinking problem or leave the force. A later scene in which LaRue attends a meeting of Alcoholics Anonymous and is warmly greeted by Furillo, revealed also to be an alcoholic, is often cited as the most memorable of the series.

During the second season, he falls off the wagon and is reassigned to the motor pool by Furillo, who later forgives LaRue and reinstates him as a detective. LaRue remains sober for the remainder of the series. "Grin and Bear It," the last episode of the fifth season, and the final one that aired before Steven Bochco's firing from the show, ends with a callback to "Jungle Madness." In the closing scene, Furillo, having now slipped himself, attends an AA meeting where LaRue is already present.

Though LaRue, at last, conquers his addiction, for the rest of the series he remains a womanizer and a frequent orchestrator of scams, get-rich-quick schemes, and sometimes dangerous practical jokes. Martin believed that "J. D. is close to being the kind of person he arrests. He pulls back just at the brink." He objected to a storyline about LaRue having a sexual relationship with a teenage girl, believing it would make his character "unredeemable." In response to his concerns, the script was changed so that LaRue rejects her.

He often appears onscreen paired with his partner and best friend, Detective Neil Washington (Taurean Blacque), who alternates between being LaRue's conscience and co-conspirator. It was one of two interracial partnerships on the show, Martin commenting, "My character is involved in enough screwups and career-shortening attitudes that he doesn't need to be a racist on top of it."

=== During and after Hill Street ===
In 1984, Martin starred as Max in a University of Alabama at Birmingham production of Martin Sherman's Bent, a controversial play about the persecution of gay men in Nazi Germany. He continued to be a frequent television guest star, appearing on The Love Boat, Father Dowling Mysteries, Miami Vice, Murder, She Wrote, and two episodes of Steven Bochco's LA Law. He also played Eckels in an episode of The Ray Bradbury Theatre in an adaptation of the science fiction short story "A Sound of Thunder." Martin starred in the short-lived 1987 Fox sitcom Second Chance with a young Matthew Perry until its revamping as Boys Will Be Boys resulted in his character being dropped. He starred as Daniel in the 1989 Spanish film Lluvia de otoño (Autumn Rain) in his only non-English-speaking role.

== Personal life ==
Martin was married three times. In 1969, he married Claudia Martin, who was actor and crooner Dean Martin's daughter. They had a daughter named Jesse. The marriage ended in 1971. He was married to Christina Montoya from 1978 to 1980. His final marriage was to Joanne La Pomaroa from 1982 to 1984.

Martin, like his character J. D. LaRue, struggled with an alcohol addiction that negatively affected his work. In 1984, at the insistence of Hill Street Blues' producers, Martin completed an alcohol rehabilitation program. LaRue was written out of four episodes of the fourth season, the only of the series in which he did not appear. Martin returned for the season finale, having achieved sobriety two years after his character. In 1986, Martin revealed that Steven Bochco had crafted LaRue's first season plotline with the goal of encouraging Martin to seek help for his real-life alcoholism. He explained that the episodes "Rites of Spring" and "Jungle Madness," where LaRue confronts his worsening addiction and eventually joins AA, "were written as a message of love to me. Steven Bochco loved me and cared for me. It was a message I failed to heed."

Martin's friend Ron Herbinger later said that Bochco was responsible for Martin entering rehabilitation and emerging "super clean." Bochco himself would say on the audio commentary for the DVD release of Hill Street Blues that Martin, "an amazing guy," had been an addict since his teenage years and that "I basically sat him down and said you're going into rehab today" or he would ensure that the actor would never work in Hollywood again. However, Martin "came out two weeks later and he never had another drink or took another drug for the rest of his life," which he described as "tragically short." After Martin's death, Daniel J. Travanti said that, "He had tried to do himself in through liquor, but he recovered and had been on a honeymoon with life for the past five years."

Martin worked with charities, including the Better Hearing Institute and United Cerebral Palsy, appearing in the latter's annual telethon. He was also an avid golfer and took part in many celebrity golf tournaments for charitable causes. Martin contributed a short essay to the Los Angeles Times about his lifelong love of fishing. A guitarist and composer, he continued to play and write songs as a hobby.

Martin's Hill Street Blues co-star Travanti remembered him as a "dynamo" whom he assumed at their first meeting was also being considered for the lead role. Charles Haid said that Martin was "the funniest guy on the set," and that he had been in "absolute awe" of Martin's talent. Bruce Weitz described him as "a character" and "a very, very good actor."

== Death ==
In January 1990, Martin was performing the role of Sgt. Merwin J. Toomey in a Calgary production of Neil Simon's Biloxi Blues when he was forced to leave the play following chest pains. A biopsy revealed that he was suffering from lung cancer and he soon began chemotherapy. Friends would later describe him as displaying "courage" and "a positive attitude" during this time.

Martin died of cardiovascular collapse caused by lung cancer, aged 46, at his home in Rancho Mirage, California. Though most obituaries reported that no funeral services were held for Martin, friend Ron Herbinger explained that "in Kiel's will he set aside some money for a party in some park in Palm Springs for close friends. He then was cremated and his ashes were flown over the gathering and spread from the sky."

== Filmography ==
Film
| Year | Title | Role | Notes | Source |
|---|---|---|---|---|
| 1960 | La caperucita roja | The Ferocious Wolf | English version, Voice, Uncredited | |
| 1961 | Caperucita y sus tres amigos | The Ferocious Wolf | English version, Voice, Uncredited | |
| 1962 | Caperucita y Pulgarcito contra los monstruos | The Ferocious Wolf | English version, Voice, Uncredited | |
| 1969 | The Undefeated | Union Runner | | |
| 1971 | The Panic in Needle Park | Chico | | |
| 1972 | Trick Baby | White Folks | | |
| 1973 | Lolly-Madonna XXX | Ludie Gutshall | | |
| 1975 | Moonrunners | Bobby Lee Hagg | | |
| 1975 | Requiem for a Nun | Red's Brother | | |
| 1982 | Human Highway | Construction Worker | | |
| 1989 | Lluvia de otoño | Daniel | | |
Television
| Year | Title | Role | Notes | Source |
| 1968 | Dragnet | Walter Marshall | Season 2, Episode 22, "The Little Victim" | |
| 1968 | Ironside | Billy Meeker | Season 1, Episode 23, "Barbara Who" | |
| 1968 | The Virginian | Tony Barnes | Season 6, Episode 4, "Star Crossed" | |
| 1968 | The Virginian | Cal Dorsey | Season 6, Episode 21, "The Hell Wind" | |
| 1969 | The Virginian | Trooper Rankin | Season 7, Episode 22, "Incident at Diablo Crossing" | |
| 1970 | Then Came Bronson | Soundtrack | Season 1, Episode 18, "That Undiscovered Country" (sings "Wonderin' Where I'm Wanderin'" and "I'm Bound for the Mountains and the Sea") | |
| 1971 | The Bold Ones: The New Doctors | Dr. Martin Thomas | Season 2, Episode 8, "Tender Predator" | |
| 1971 | The Psychiatrist | Jo Jo Poole | Season 1, Episode 5, "Ex-Sgt. Randell File, U.S.A." | |
| 1972 | The Catcher | Wes Watkins | TV movie | |
| 1972 | Gunsmoke | Ike Daggett | Season 18, Episode 5, "The Drummer" | |
| 1973 | Kung Fu | Marshal | Season 1, Episode 13, "The Stone" | |
| 1974 | Kodiak | Ty Spencer | Season 1, Episode 8, "Captured" | |
| 1975 | The Log of the Black Pearl | Christopher Sand | TV movie | |
| 1975 | Requiem for a Nun | Pete | TV movie | |
| 1976 | The Blue Knight | Hank Meyer | Season 1, Episode 7, "The Candy Man" | |
| 1976 | Joe Forrester | Marty Singer | Season 1, Episode 19, "Girl on a String" | |
| 1976 | Harry O | Ed Wilkie | Season 2, Episode 22, "Death Certificate" | |
| 1976 | Delvecchio | Billy Yates | Season 1, Episode 11, "Red Is the Color of My True Love's Hair" | |
| 1977-1978 | The Edge of Night | Raney Cooper | TV soap opera | |
| 1979 | Paris | Bo Manning | Season 1, Episode 1, "Pilot" | |
| 1981-1987 | Hill Street Blues | John "J. D." LaRue | 140 episodes | |
| 1981 | Child Bride of Short Creek | Bob Kalish | TV movie | |
| 1982 | Matt Houston | Bill Claudius | Season 1, Episode 5, "Who Would Kill Ramona?" | |
| 1982 | The Love Boat | Joe Novak | Season 6, Episode 7, "The Spoonmaker Diamond/Papa Doc/The Role Model/Julie's Tycoon: Part 1" | |
| 1982 | The Love Boat | Joe Novak | Season 6, Episode 8, "The Spoonmaker Diamond/Papa Doc/The Role Model/Julie's Tycoon: Part 2" | |
| 1987 | Convicted: A Mother's Story | Van | TV movie | |
| 1987 | If It's Tuesday, It Still Must Be Belgium | Zane Drinkwater | TV movie | |
| 1987 | Second Chance | Charles Russell | 9 episodes | |
| 1989 | Father Dowling Mysteries | Parker | Season 1, Episode 1, "The Missing Body Mystery. Part 1" | |
| 1989 | LA Law | Frank Weiland | Season 3, Episode 15, "The Unbearable Lightness of Boring" | |
| 1989 | LA Law | Frank Weiland | Season 3, Episode 16, "His Suit Is Hirsute" | |
| 1989 | Miami Vice | Paul Cutter | Season 5, Episode 20, "Leap of Faith" | |
| 1989 | The Ray Bradbury Theater | Eckels | Season 3, Episode 6, "A Sound of Thunder" | |
| 1990 | Perry Mason: The Case of the Poisoned Pen | Max Mulgrew | TV movie | |
| 1990 | Murder, She Wrote | Danny Snow | Season 6, Episode 13, "If the Shoe Fits" (final appearance) | |
