= Café Americain =

American television sitcom

- Main cast
- Genre: Sitcom
- Created by: Peter Noah
- Starring: Valerie Bertinelli; Lila Kaye; Sofia Milos; Maurice Godin; Jodi Long; Graham Beckel
- Music by: Roger Bellon
- Country of origin: United States
- Original language: English
- No. of seasons: 1
- No. of episodes: 18

Production
- Executive producer: Jack Grossbart
- Producers: Pamela Grant; Peter Noah
- Running time: 30 minutes
- Production companies: Peter Noah Productions; Warner Bros. Television

Original release
- Network: NBC
- Release: September 18, 1993 – May 28, 1994

Café Americain is an American television sitcom starring Valerie Bertinelli that aired on NBC from September 18, 1993, to February 8, 1994, with two leftover episodes shown on May 28, 1994. It was filmed at Warner Bros. Studios in Burbank, California.

== Overview ==
Bertinelli played a young American woman, Holly Aldridge, who finds a job working as a waitress in a small café in Paris. The cast consisted of an assortment of eccentric characters from around the world who regularly visited the café, interacting in many hilarious circumstances. Madame Ybarra, a former dictator's wife, was a thinly veiled spoof of Imelda Marcos. Fabiana Borelli, the tempestuous Italian model, and her perpetually jealous Italian lover Carlo, regularly sparred and reconciled, with Carlo declaring of any real or imagined rival, "I kill him! I kill him bad! I kill him two times!" Marcel's on and off relationship with Holly set the stage for comedic interference by several guest star suitors.

== Cast ==
=== Main cast ===
- Valerie Bertinelli as Holly Aldrige
- Lila Kaye as Margaret Hunt
- Sofia Milos as Fabiana Borelli
- Maurice Godin as Marcel
- Jodi Long as Madame Ybarra
- Graham Beckel as Steve Sullivan

=== Recurring ===
- Luigi Amodeo as Carlo Benini

== Production and casting ==
The series was originated in 1992 by creator/showrunner Peter Noah for 20th Television and pitched to pilot to NBC. As NBC decided not to move forward in 1992, the pilot was repicked up by Lorimar Television, whose company was later absorbed into Warner Bros. Television before its premiere. The series was picked up in May 1993.

Although Lila Kaye played the role of Margaret in the series pilot, the role was re-cast with Happy Days actress Marion Ross when the series was picked up. Within a month, Ross was gone and Kaye agreed to reprise the role. The role of Margaret Hunt was also offered to Rue McClanahan, but she turned it down.

At the time of filming, Valerie Bertinelli was married to guitarist Eddie Van Halen, who appeared in the 7th episode, "Home Alone," as a street musician that Bertinelli's character Holly Aldridge chases out of the cafe. Van Halen spoke one line, "Praat je tegen mij?" The line is Dutch for "Are you talking to me?"

== Episodes ==
No.	Title	Directed by	Written by	Original release date	Prod. code	Viewers (millions)
1	"Pilot"	James Burrows	Peter Noah	September 18, 1993	475070	N/A
2	"Le Confidence Game"	Robert Berlinger	Peter Noah	September 25, 1993	455801	12.8
3	"Weekend at Holly's"	James Burrows	Sarit Catz & Gloria Ketterer	October 2, 1993	455802	10.8
4	"The Language of Really Good Friends"	Robert Berlinger	Bruce Rasmussen	October 9, 1993	455804	13.9
5	"Happy Birthday to Moi"	James Burrows	Eric Cohen	October 16, 1993	455803	12.1
6	"Every Picture Tells a Story...Don't It?"	Robert Berlinger	Bill Barol	October 23, 1993	455805	11.2
7	"Home Alone"	Robert Berlinger	Bruce Rasmussen	November 6, 1993	455806	11.3
8	"There's No Business Like Show Business"	Robert Berlinger	Sarit Catz & Gloria Ketterer	November 13, 1993	455808	10.0
9	"...And Giblets for All"	Robert Berlinger	Bill Barol	November 20, 1993	455807	10.0
10	"Toast of the Town"	Robert Berlinger	Bruce Rasmussen	November 27, 1993	455810	10.1
11	"Mommy Dearest"	Robert Berlinger	Sarit Catz & Gloria Ketterer	December 11, 1993	455809	9.0
12	"Deck the Halls with Boughs of Holly"	Robert Berlinger	Eric Cohen	December 18, 1993	455812	9.0
13	"The Dating Game"	Robert Berlinger	Sarit Catz, David Silverman, Gloria Ketterer & Marcy Gray Rubin	January 4, 1994	455811	9.8
14	"Le Date"	Robert Berlinger	Peter Noah	January 11, 1994	455813	8.3
15	"All About Kelly"	Robert Berlinger	Sarit Catz & Gloria Ketterer	January 18, 1994	455814	10.0
16	"Love the One You're With"	Matthew Diamond	Bruce Rasmussen	February 8, 1994	455816	9.0
17	"Oh, Brother"	Pamela Fryman	Sarit Catz & Gloria Ketterer	May 28, 1994	455817	6.6
18	"The Fashion Show"	Robert Berlinger	Eric Cohen	May 28, 1994	455815	6.8
