= Maris Curran =

American filmmaker

- Born: U.S.
- Occupation(s): Director, writer, producer
- Years active: 2015–present

Maris Curran is an American filmmaker. She is best known for directing the films Five Nights in Maine (2015) and Jeannette (2022).

== Career ==
Maris earned her BA from Smith College and an MFA from the School of the Art Institute of Chicago. She participated in the Whitney Independent Study Program at the Whitney Museum of American Art and won a Fulbright Scholarship to Mexico City. In 2015, she directed her debut feature film, Five Nights in Maine, starring David Oyelowo, Teyonah Parris, Rosie Perez and Dianne Wiest, which premiered at the Toronto International Film Festival and was released theatrically. In 2016, she directed the documentary short, The Man Is the Music, about the artist and musician Lonnie Holley. In 2018, her short documentary film, While I Yet Live, about five quilters and freedom fighters from Gee's Bend, Alabama premiered at the Berlinale.

In 2022, Maris directed the feature documentary, Jeannette, about Jeannette Feliciano, a survivor of the Orlando Pulse nightclub massacre. The film provides an intimate window into the aftermath of trauma. She was awarded a Guggenheim Fellowship in 2023.

== Filmography ==
| Year | Title | Contribution | Note |
|---|---|---|---|
| 2015 | Five Nights in Maine | Director, writer and producer | Feature film |
| 2016 | The Man Is the Music | Director and producer | Short Documentary |
| 2018 | While I yet Live | Director and producer | Short Documentary |
| 2022 | Jeannette | Director and producer | Documentary |

== Awards and nominations ==
| Year | Result | Award | Category | Work | Ref. |
|---|---|---|---|---|---|
| 2016 | Nominated | Cleveland International Film Festival | Best American Independent Feature Film | Five Nights in Maine | |
| 2016 | Nominated | Nashville Film Festival | Bridgestone Narrative Feature Competition | Five Nights in Maine | |
| 2016 | Nominated | Palm Springs International Film Festival | New Visions Grand Jury Prize | Five Nights in Maine | |
| 2016 | Nominated | Vail Film Festival | Narrative Feature | Five Nights in Maine | |
| 2016 | Won | Ashland Independent Film Festival | Best Ensemble Acting | Five Nights in Maine | |
| 2017 | Won | Indie Memphis | Audience Award | The Man Is The Music | |
| 2018 | Nominated | LA Film Festival | Best Documentary Short | While I yet Live | |
| 2018 | Nominated | Berlin International Film Festival | Best Short Film | While I yet Live | |
| 2018 | Won | Nashville Film Festival | Special Jury Prize | While I yet Live | |
| 2018 | Won | RiverRun International Film Festival | Best Documentary Short | While I yet Live | |
| 2018 | Won | Frameline Film Festival | Frameline Completion Fund | Jeannette | |
| 2022 | Won | San Francisco International Film Festival | Best Documentary Feature | Jeannette | |
| 2022 | Won | Outfest | Best Documentary Feature | Jeannette | |
