= Second Chance (1987 TV series) =

American sitcom (1987–88)

- Also known as: Boys Will Be Boys
- Genre: Sitcom
- Created by: David W. Duclon; Gary Menteer
- Starring: Kiel Martin; Matthew Perry; William Gallo; Demian Slade; Randee Heller; Joseph Maher; Terri Ivens; Adam Sadowsky
- Opening theme: "I Gotta Go Back"
- Composers: Rik Howard; Bob Wirth
- Country of origin: United States
- Original language: English
- No. of seasons: 1
- No. of episodes: 21

Production
- Camera setup: Multi-camera
- Running time: 30 minutes
- Production companies: Lightkeeper Productions; 20th Century Fox Television

Original release
- Network: Fox
- Release: September 26, 1987 – May 14, 1988

Second Chance is an American sitcom, created by David W. Duclon and Gary Menteer, which aired on Fox from September 26 to November 28, 1987. The series was then revamped under the new title Boys Will Be Boys, and ran in the new format from January 16 to May 14, 1988.

== Second Chance ==
In its original format, the show starred Kiel Martin as Charles Russell, a deceased man, and Matthew Perry as his younger self, who is nicknamed Chazz. On July 29, 2011, Charles dies in a hovercraft accident, and his soul is promptly sent to the high spiritual palace of Saint Peter (Joseph Maher). It is there that Saint Peter determines that Charles is too good for hell but not good enough to get into heaven; therefore, Charles is sent back to Earth in the year 1987, to re-join his life during the teenage years in order to help himself, through the younger Chazz, make more moral choices.

Charles showed up at his childhood home with a different last name, Time, which he assumed from the magazine of the same name; it was also symbolic of his travel back through time and the extra amount of it he was awarded by Saint Peter. He came to rent out an apartment over the Russell garage when his feisty, sensible mother Helen (Randee Heller) needed a boarder to help make ends meet. Charles was a convenience store proprietor by day in between his efforts to reconnect with Chazz, who from the start had no idea that the new tenant hanging around and becoming buddy-like was in fact his older self. The two did form an instant friendship, and Chazz, who was in dire need of a resident father figure, often found himself turning to Charles (either directly or not) when life's dilemmas got too out of hand. Chazz's two best friends were tough, supercool Francis "Booch" Lottabucci (William Gallo) and awkward, geeky Eugene Blooberman (Demian Slade), the latter of whom was tolerated by Chazz but always regularly put down by Booch. As the boys cooked up schemes, encountered teenage romance and got into trouble, Charles was there to be the voice of reason, even if Booch and Eugene didn't understand why he was involved. In turn, Saint Peter, grading Charles's progress in his effort to grow into a new man the second time around, watched over him like a hawk. Saint Peter, however, could only be seen or heard by Charles.

The early episodes focused on the Russells' efforts to keep the family home, in wake of Helen's ex-husband (played in guest appearances by Richard Kline) becoming six months behind on his alimony. In the pilot episode, Booch talks Chazz into disguising themselves as older men to purchase lottery tickets, with the idea of eventually stealing from the convenience store if they didn't win the jackpot. It just happened to be the older Charles' convenience store they came to; Charles watched himself (Chazz) and Booch attempt to get away with their plan. He then stepped in and began gently manipulating them with sage advice in order to get the boys (namely himself) to do the right thing. Despite nearly everyone in the picture not catching on to the fact that Charles Time was really the older Chazz Russell, it was Helen who always exclaimed the similarities that both Charles and Chazz had in their behavior (i.e., synchronizing their movements of picking up utensils and drinking milk at the kitchen table, at the same time) and even in their looks.

By the end of November sweeps, ratings were unsatisfactory even by the standards of the young Fox network, which had yet to rival the established broadcast networks in audience size. Second Chance left the air briefly, as Duclon, Menteer, and company set out to retool the show. Second Chance would end up being the final series in which Martin would have a starring role before his death of lung cancer in 1990.

=== Colonel Gaddafi "prediction" ===
In the opening scene for the pilot, as a throwaway joke, Colonel Muammar Gaddafi is shown being judged after his death, with the date given as July 29, 2011. In the year after the Berlin discotheque bombing and the U.S. response, the 1987 pilot was playing off Gaddafi's prominent negative perception by the American public. Twenty-four years later, by coincidence, Gaddafi's death (on October 20, 2011) occurred within three months of the "predicted" date and was from the same cause (multiple gunshot wounds).

== Boys Will Be Boys ==
After a little over a month off the air, the series was retooled and returned in January 1988 under a new title, Boys Will Be Boys. In this revamp, the supernatural element was dropped, causing Kiel Martin and Joseph Maher to exit the cast. As the new title implied, the format now revolved solely around the antics of Chazz, Booch and Eugene. Helen was by now in a much better financial situation, and was able to keep the family home. This was also evidenced by a three-part excursion the cast took to Las Vegas as the retooled series began. Booch, whose alcoholic father had just died, had moved in with the Russells—but not into the main house itself. With the apartment over the garage now tenantless, Chazz and Booch decided to move in there together, getting a taste of independence and the roommate experience already in high school. Eugene, of course, always dropped by to share in their escapades and to annoy Booch (and Chazz to a lesser extent).

Two new characters were added to the show, who had previously made guest appearances on Second Chance. Debbie Miller (Terri Ivens), Chazz's main love interest since first grade, had broken up with Chazz during her early guest shot on the show, but, now on full-time, began to romantically drift back to Chazz—only after dating others first. The two soon resumed being an item. Also joining the cast was Alex (Adam Sadowsky), who, in his Second Chance guest appearances, made friends with Chazz and revealed to the older Charles Russell that he was also on a mission for God. This character history was disregarded for Boys Will Be Boys, as Alex was now a classmate/friend to Booch and Eugene as well as Chazz.

Although the format was tweaked, the series was moved around Fox's Saturday night schedule a few more times, and was then cancelled at the end of the season. After the last original episode of Boys Will Be Boys aired on May 14, 1988, repeats aired through July 2 of that year.

== Cast ==
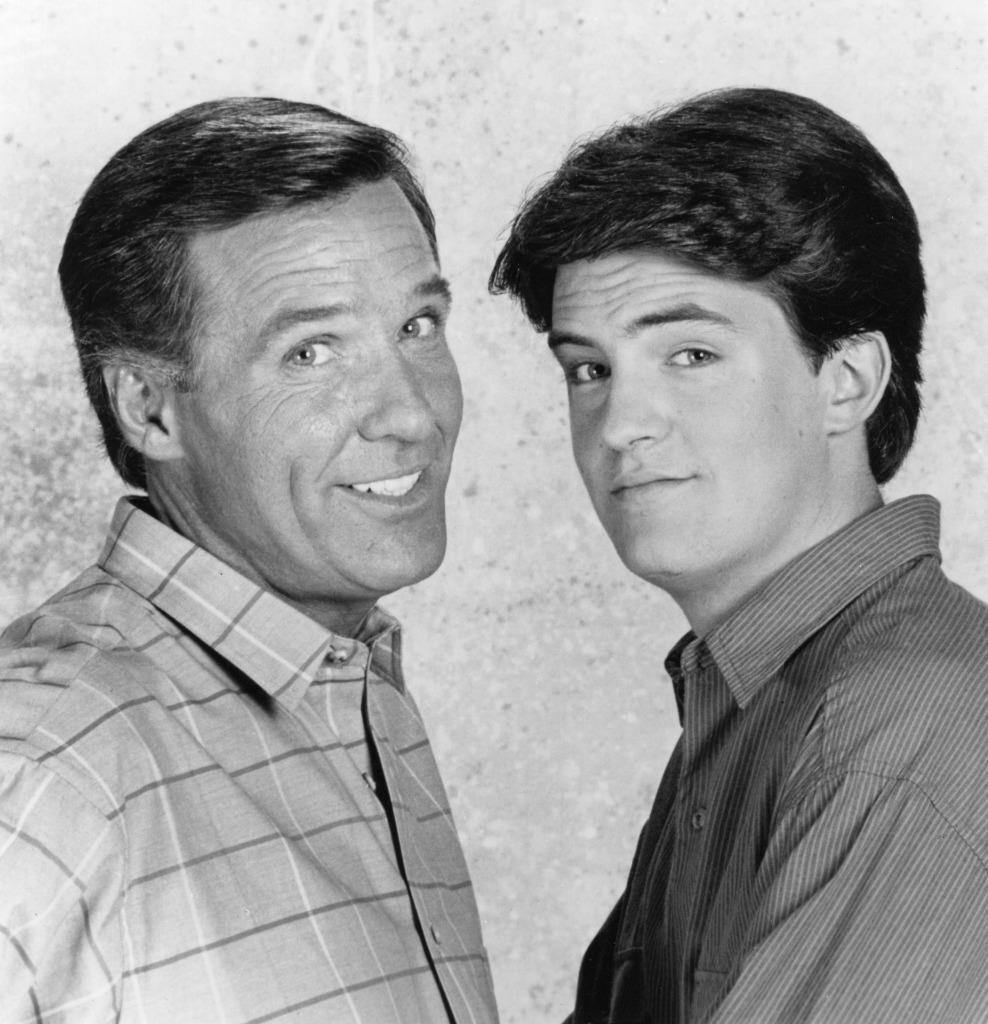
Kiel Martin and Matthew Perry in 1987

- Kiel Martin as Charles Russell/Charles Time (1987)
- Matthew Perry as Chazz Russell
- Randee Heller as Helen
- William Gallo as Francis "Booch" Lottabucci
- Demian Slade as Eugene Blooberman
- Joseph Maher as St. Peter (1987)
- Terri Ivens as Debbie Miller (1988)
- Adam Sadowsky as Alex (1988)

== Episodes ==
=== Second Chance (1987) ===
No. overall	No. in season	Title	Directed by	Written by	Original release date
1	1	"The End"	Jim Drake	David W. Duclon & Gary Menteer	September 26, 1987
2	2	"Moving In"	Jim Drake	Deborah Serra & Cheryl Alu	October 3, 1987
3	3	"Plain Jane"	Jim Drake	Mike Marmer	October 10, 1987
4	4	"Life Without Father"	Jim Drake	Jim Geoghan	October 17, 1987
5	5	"Oedipus Russell"	Jim Drake	Jim Mayer	October 24, 1987
6	6	"Handy Boy"	Jim Drake	Deborah Serra & Cheryl Alu	November 7, 1987
7	7	"To Have Loved and Lost"	Jim Drake	Jim Geoghan	November 14, 1987
8	8	"Mid-Term Blues"	Jim Drake	Stephen Langford	November 21, 1987
9	9	"A Hunting We Will Go"	Jim Cox	Jim Geoghan	November 28, 1987

=== Boys Will Be Boys (1988) ===
No. overall	No. in season	Title	Directed by	Written by	Original release date
10	1	"Hot Wheels"	Jim Cox	Lang Elliott	January 16, 1988
11	2	"Viva Las Vegas: Part 1"	Jim Cox	Jim Geoghan	January 23, 1988
12	3	"Viva Las Vegas: Part 2"	Unknown	Manny Basanese & Stephen Langford	January 30, 1988
13	4	"Changes: Part 1"	Marc Gass	Mady Julian	February 6, 1988
14	5	"Changes: Part 2"	Unknown	Jim Geoghan	February 14, 1988
15	6	"The Girl Next Door"	Jack Shea	Unknown	February 20, 1988
16	7	"South of the Border"	Jack Shea	Stephen Langford	February 27, 1988
17	8	"The Gang"	Unknown	Manny Basanese	March 5, 1988
18	9	"The Secret of Their Success"	Gerren Keith	Nick Gore & Jerry Jacobius	March 12, 1988
19	10	"The Front"	Gerren Keith	John Antoniou & Tom Johnstone	March 19, 1988
20	11	"Two Men and a Baby"	Gerren Keith	Mady Julian	April 9, 1988
21	12	"The Triangle"	Jim Drake	Jim Geoghan	May 7, 1988

== Production ==
As created and produced by the team of David W. Duclon and Gary Menteer, Second Chance initially had many similarities to another one of their programs, Punky Brewster. Both shows had surrogate father figure leads as co-stars (Martin's Charles Russell on Second Chance and George Gaynes's Henry Warnimont, adoptive father of the title character of Punky). The Second Chance theme song, a warm rock ballad titled "I Gotta Go Back", was composed by Bob Wirth and Rik Howard, who had been the composers on most Duclon/Menteer shows, including Punky Brewster. The theme music, in fact, used the same instrumentation and pitch as the Punky theme.

During the episodes of the series that ran under the title Second Chance, yellow Optima font was used for the credits, which was then currently seen on Punky Brewster. Also, Punky Brewster featured a "tough kid" character in Season 1 named Scotty Lottabucci - a surname recycled in Second Chance. In yet another similarity, the reference of Time magazine was used on both shows. In a Season 2 Punky Brewster episode, Henry, Punky, and their dog Brandon have a family photo taken in Henry's new photography studio, which is superimposed into an actual shell cover of Time with the fictional headline "Father of the Year". It appears that Duclon and Menteer were fans of the publication.

Once the series became Boys Will Be Boys, the theme song was revamped so that it was in a slightly higher pitch, but now as an instrumental, jazzy version dominated by saxophone and electric guitar. The newer version of the theme, and the musical cues that also changed, came to be a forerunner of the hipper, more irreverent sound that would soon permeate through other Fox shows. The credit font also changed, but otherwise the familiar production traits of Duclon and Menteer remained.

Adam Sadowsky was hired to become a regular on Boys Will Be Boys after having worked under Duclon's past creative partner, Michael G. Moye, on It's Your Move (NBC, 1984–85). Before It's Your Move, Duclon and Moye had been producers on NBC's Silver Spoons. By 1987, both Moye and Duclon had development deals with the fledgling Fox network, with Moye being a co-creator of one of Fox's most popular freshman series, Married... with Children.

Perry's father John Bennett Perry auditioned for Charles Russell hoping father and son would play the same role.
