= Living Other Lives =

1995 novel by Caroline Leavitt

- First edition
- Author: Caroline Leavitt
- Language: English
- Genre: Novel
- Publisher: Warner Books
- Publication date: 1995
- Publication place: United States
- Media type: Print (hardback)
- Pages: 327 pp
- ISBN: 0-446-51705-4
- OCLC: 30671235
- Dewey Decimal: 813/.54 20
- LC Class: PS3562.E2617 L56 1995

Living Other Lives is a novel by the American writer Caroline Leavitt set in 1990s New York City and Pittsburgh, Pennsylvania.

It tells the story of Lilly Bloom, who after her fiancé's accidental death just before their marriage, drives his unruly daughter, Dinah, 15, from Manhattan to the Pittsburgh home of her deceased fiancé's mother.
