= 1000 Airplanes on the Roof =

1988 melodrama by Philip Glass

- melodrama by Philip Glass
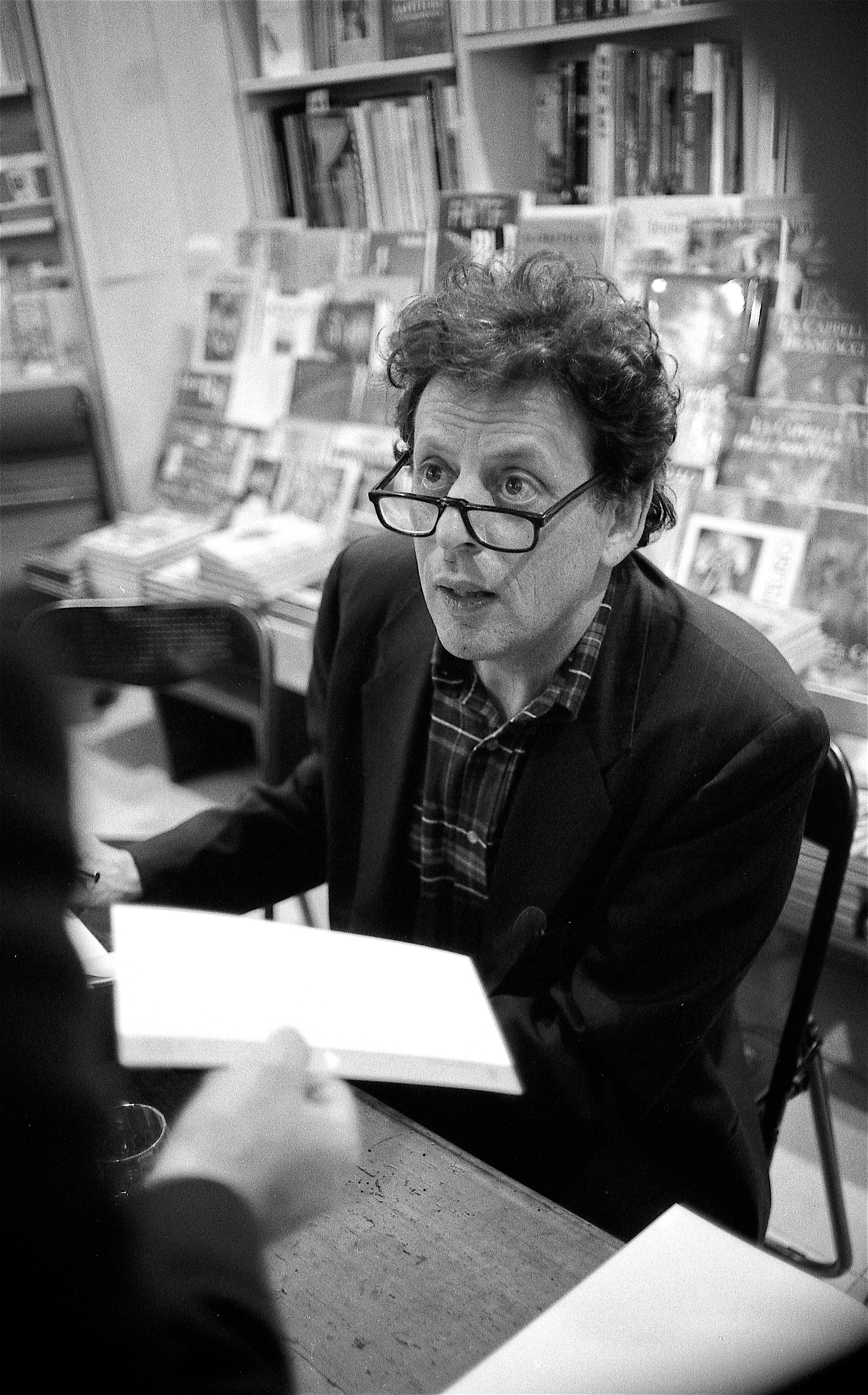
- Glass in Florence, 1993
- Premiere: July 15, 1988; Vienna International Airport

1000 Airplanes on the Roof is a melodrama in one act with music by Philip Glass, text by David Henry Hwang, and projections by Jerome Sirlin. Glass described it as "a science fiction music drama".

The work was commissioned by the Donau Festival, Krems an der Donau, the American Music Theater Festival, Philadelphia, and West Berlin City Council in 1988. It premiered on July 15 of that year at the Vienna Airport in Hangar #3. The performance featured vocals by Linda Ronstadt and was conducted by Michael Riesman. The US premiere took place in September 1988 at the American Music Theater Festival in Philadelphia and went on to play in 40 North American cities, including New York, Boston, Chicago and Toronto, as well as Glasgow during that city's celebration as European City of Culture.

== Synopsis ==
The drama is set in New York City with a sole character, "M", who recalls encounters with extraterrestrial life forms, including their message:

It is better to forget, it is pointless to remember. No one will believe you. You will have spoken a heresy. You will be outcast.

In the staged production, "M" performs in the midst of a three-dimensional, holographic set. In the classic sense of the word melodrama, the role is performed by an actor in a spoken monologue over music. In the world premiere, "M" was played by a male actor; in many of the US performances, the character was played alternately by female actor Jodi Long and male actor Patrick O'Connell.

== Discography ==
- Philip Glass: 1000 Airplanes on the Roof (The Philip Glass Ensemble and Linda Ronstadt; Martin Goldray, Music Direction), 1989. Virgin 86106-2

== Book ==
The libretto and images of the original set are published in:

- Philip Glass, David Henry Hwang and Jerome Sirlin (Introduction by John Howell), 1000 Airplanes on the Roof, Salt Lake City: Peregrine Smith Book, 1989 ISBN 0-87905-343-7
