= The Last Fling =

- Genre: Comedy; Romance
- Written by: Mitchel Katlin
- Directed by: Corey Allen
- Starring: John Ritter; Connie Sellecca
- Theme music composer: Charles Bernstein
- Country of origin: United States
- Original language: English

Production
- Executive producer: Leonard Hill
- Producer: Ronald H. Gilbert
- Production location: Los Angeles
- Cinematography: Peter Stein
- Editor: Daniel T. Cahn
- Running time: 95 minutes
- Production company: Leonard Hill Films

Original release
- Network: ABC
- Release: February 9, 1987

The Last Fling is a 1987 American made-for-television romantic comedy film directed by Corey Allen, written by Mitchel Katlin, and starring John Ritter and Connie Sellecca.

== Plot ==
Divorce attorney Phillip Reed is tired of one-night stands, like Joanne. He commiserates to happy couple, Linda and Jack, the lack of romance in his life.

At a Los Angeles Memorial Coliseum football game, Gloria Franklin, marrying in two weeks, finds out her fiancé Jason is going to Vegas for a bachelor party weekend. She is unhappy that he has avoided mentioning it and that he is dismissive of a one last fling by her.

At the Los Angeles Zoo Gloria meets Phillip, but calls herself Marsha Lyons, seeing and hearing a lion. They get acquainted, and Gloria/Marsha promises to call Phillip. She tries to tells him she's engaged, but doesn't.

At work Phillip listens to Fields describe his marriage failure. Phillip leaves the office with his workmate Drew and talks about Gloria/Marsha. Phillip bumps into Joanne, a woman he saw casually, and breaks it off.

Gloria/Marsha's friend Mimi encourages her to call Phillip. After her call to Jason in Las Vegas is answered by another woman, (shown topless without evidence of clothing, then Phillip rushing out of his hotel shower), Gloria/Marsha, feeling betrayed, calls Phillip and asks him to her family's beach house in Acapulco, leaving early Saturday morning.

After Phillip and Gloria/Marsha's Acapulco rental car catches fire, they hitch a ride with in a flat bed truck with others, dancing to Bob Seger's Katmandu, and arrive at the beach house. They dine, dance, and bed together. On Sunday morning, Phillip finds Gloria/Marsha's videotape that reveals she is marrying the next week.

On Monday, Phillip goes to work, telling Drew and Beverly what happened. Drew points how difficult it could be to locate her in only a week. Gloria is with Mimi, who is gushing over the wedding dress. Gloria is distraught, and when pressed as to why, instead of mentioning Phillip laments over how predictable and dull their life will be.

That evening, when Jason asks what she did over the weekend, Gloria tells him, but so sarcastically, that he believes she's joking. He later scolds her for loading the dishwasher 'incorrectly' and she is enraged.

Late to the courthouse, Phillip is feeding pigeons on a bench when Walt from his newsstand comes by, with his wife of 30 years. When he asks how he knew Sophia was the one, he said he just knew. Walt wishes Phillip luck in finding his love in time. Inspired, Phillip goes to the courthouse and asks the judge to put off the Fields's hearing to give them time to reconsider.

Then, Phillip breaks into the Acapulco beach house, finding a name on a Nalfon pill bottle, before he's arrested. Drew "bails" him out of jail. Back in Los Angeles Phillip locates Gloria/Marsha's mother, but she has her son toss him out.

Knowing Gloria/Marsha's last name is Franklin, Phillip sends roses to every possible Franklin residence, with cards to Marsha, asking her to not get married. Gloria/Marsha calls him and he insists they meet. At the zoo, he talks down from an skyway and she talks up from an underpass bus stop, insisting it's too late, listing all the impediments to cancelling, but doesn't say she doesn't love him, and then leaves on a bus.

Phillip knows her fiancé's name is Jason Elliot, and finds his address in the phone book but just misses her. Jason mentions her name as Gloria and the wedding is in a downtown hotel. Phillip mentions his name, which Gloria said with whom she spent his bachelor party weekend. He gets Linda and Jack to drive to downtown hotels, finding it on the third stop. Then he tries to stop the wedding and convince Gloria that they belong together. After chases, chance meetings (Fields and his wife embracing...) and slapstick, Phillip leaves.

In her bridal gown, Gloria finds Phillip at the zoo where they first met, and kiss.

== Cast ==
- John Ritter as Phillip Reed
- Connie Sellecca as Gloria Franklin
- Randee Heller as Mimi
- John Bennett Perry as Jason Elliot
- Paul Sand as Jack
- Scott Bakula as Drew
- Deena Freeman as Beverly
- Kate Zentall as Lynda
- Shannon Tweed as Joanne Preston
- Larry Gelman as Walt
- Gretchen Wyler as Mrs. Franklin
- Andrew Masset as Doug
- Janet Wood as Nancy
- Steve Kahan as Amigo de Jason
- Bea Silvern as Sophia
- Michael Alldredge as Larry Fields
- Paddi Edwards as Mrs. Reed
- Julie Parrish as Marge Fields
- Jamie Bozian as Andrea
- H.B. Haggerty as Hotel Porter
- Lillian Lehman as Hotel Receptionist
- Mario Lopez as Car Rental Clerk

== Production ==
An exterior setting features Salmon Run (sculpture, 1982, Christopher Keene) at Manulife Plaza on the southwest corner of Figueroa Street and Fifth Street, Bunker Hill, Los Angeles, California. and another setting features the Los Angeles Sheraton Grande Hotel.

Running themes include: black bears, cats on mouths, Phillip and Gloria near-meetings, and Phillip tripping.

== Reception ==
John J. O'Connor of The New York Times wrote that the film "tries hard, and often rather amiably, to be what used to be known as a romantic romp" but "gives us silliness that keeps toppling into stupidity."
