= Mama Malone =

- Created by: Terrence McNally
- Starring: Lila Kaye; Randee Heller; Evan Richards; Don Amendolia
- Country of origin: United States
- Original language: English
- No. of seasons: 1
- No. of episodes: 13

Production
- Executive producers: Paul Bogart; Richard Lewis
- Running time: 30 minutes
- Production companies: Jack Barry-Dan Enright Productions; Richard Lewis Productions; Columbia Pictures Television

Original release
- Network: CBS
- Release: March 7 – July 21, 1984

Mama Malone is an American sitcom that aired on CBS from March 7 to July 21, 1984. It was created by playwright Terrence McNally, featured a theme song by Kander and Ebb, and starred Lila Kaye in the title role as a New Yorker with a cooking show.

== Premise ==
The series' main character was Renate Malone (surname rhymed with "baloney"), Italian-American widow of an Irish-American policeman, thus the unusual pronunciation of her married name. She was the hostess of a home cooking show called Cooking with Mama Malone that was telecast live from her fourth-floor apartment in a Brooklyn tenement. Each episode began with her instructing her viewers on a recipe that was never completed because a parade of family members, friends, and acquaintances kept popping in to interrupt her and eat up the show's running time. Family problems and moral and social issues were discussed, and each episode played out in real-time.

== Production ==
Terrence McNally knew that there was money in television and aspired to give up life as a playwright and have a cushy life as a TV writer in Malibu. There was snobbery in theatre groups over TV writers, so McNally hitched his star to the wagon of Norman Lear, who was an uncredited producer and assembled a crew of veterans of All in the Family, including Paul Bogart, who directed all 13 episodes. Not knowing how television worked, McNally initially insisted on writing all of scripts himself, but he ultimately penned seven of the teleplays, with the others knocked out by established TV writers, as well as fellow playwright Leonard Melfi.

Although the series is uncannily reminiscent of another ethnically based radio/TV series, The Goldbergs, McNally claimed that he was inspired by TV's French Chef, Julia Child.

Initially, the show was slated to premiere in the fall of 1982, but it was dropped from the schedule to make a slot for Filthy Rich, which was an unexpected hit when its pilot episodes were burned off that summer. It was rescheduled four times over the next year-and-a-half, before ultimately debuting in the spring of 1984, two years after the pilot was produced. By the time it premiered in the USA, it had already concluded its run in 17 other countries. CBS paid to keep the cast under contract, and there were concerns that Frankie would jump from age 12 to 14 if the show returned that fall, but these proved to be unwarranted since the show debuted near the bottom of the Nielsen ratings and remained there for the entirety of its run. The series originally aired between One Day at a Time, which was wrapping up its nine-season run, and the CBS Wednesday Night Movie. After six episodes were broadcast, it was officially canceled. Additional episodes and a few reruns were broadcast that summer on Saturday nights.

== Cast ==
- Lila Kaye as 'Mama' Renate Malone - The widow of an alcoholic policeman and the child of Italian immigrants, Renate is referred to as 'Mama' by most everyone (except her priest, who calls her 'The Godmother'). She can be brash (frequently asking, "Who else is gonna tell you these things?"), but she's the glue that holds her community together, and her loving nature tends to win everyone over. She has a bizarre obsession with actor James Garner.
- Randee Heller as Connie Malone Karamkopoulos - Mama's headstrong daughter, who works at Paulo's Pizza Patio. She was briefly married to a Greek man, but she left him when she discovered he was cheating on her. Has a crush on Father Jose.
- Evan Richards as Frankie Karamkopoulos - Connie's 12-year-old son.
- Don Amendolia as Dino Forresti - Mama's brother, a lounge singer who likes to create the illusion that he's more famous than he actually is. He drives an ostentatious car with a horn that plays the theme from The Godfather, has a mirrored ceiling in his apartment, and wears a toupee to disguise his bald head. He frequently stares into the camera and exclaims, "I didn't know that! Did you know that?"
- Sam Anderson as Stanley - The show's announcer, who has a master's degree in drama from Yale and feels his talents are being wasted.
- Raymond Singer as Austin - The show's director, who tries in vain to ensure Mama Malone completes a recipe.
- Pendleton Brown as Ken - The show's associate director.
- Joey Jupiter-Levin as Jackie - The show's production assistant.

=== Recurring ===
- Ralph Manza as Padre Guardiano - The senile priest has so much difficulty climbing the stairs to Mama's apartment that he's too winded to communicate.
- Richard Yniguez as Father Jose Silva - The hip new Puerto Rican priest is the opposite of the decrepit padre; he insists on being called Jose rather than Father, wears short-shorts to play basketball with the local youth, and even sports a T-shirt with the poster art from The Exorcist.
- Alice Ghostley as Nedda Cavalli - Mama Malone's gloomy best friend; the two have a catty love/hate relationship.
- Paul Benedict as Calvin Klinger - The building's newest resident, who's initially repulsed by Mama Malone's media circus, although he's ultimately seduced by her charms.

Note: Manza and Yniguez both received star billing, but they only appeared in a handful of episodes.

== US television ratings ==
Season	Episodes	Start date	End date	Nielsen rank	Nielsen rating
1983-84	13	March 14, 1984	July 21, 1984	81	11.4 (Note: Tied with "Whiz Kids")

Note: The rating presented here comes from the TV ratings guide website and may not be completely accurate.

== Episodes ==
No.	Title	Directed by	Written by	Original release date	Prod. code
1	"Pilot"	Paul Bogart	Terrence McNally	March 7, 1984	7658
Father Silva reveals that Frankie stole his classmate's lunch money. Rank: 54 Rating/Share: 12.1/20
2	"The Commitment"	Paul Bogart	Bernard Dilbert & Leonard Melfi	March 14, 1984	82-104
Mama Malone freaks out when she finds out Dino is living with and dating a stripper (Stephanie Faracy). Rank: 59 Rating/Share: 11.3/17
3	"Connie's Old Flame"	Paul Bogart	Terrence McNally	March 21, 1984	82-102
Connie's been sneaking around with her old boyfriend because she knows her mother will disapprove. Rank: 66 Rating/Share: 11.5/18
4	"Father Romeo"	Paul Bogart	Robert Van Scoyk	April 4, 1984	82-106
After Mama Malone's niece (Candice Azzara) seeks marital advice from Father Silva, her jealous husband (Robert Costanzo) causes a scene on the show. Rank: 62 Rating/Share: 9.7/15
5	"The Education of Frankie"	Paul Bogart	Lynn Lathem & Bernard Lechowick	April 18, 1984	82-112
When Frankie brings home a more mature girl (Melora Hardin), his family wonders if it's time to have the sex talk with him.
6	"Karamakopoulos and Son"	Paul Bogart	Harvey Weitzman & Sid Dorfman	April 25, 1984	82-107
Frankie's father is coming to visit for the first time in 8 years, but the boy's reaction is anger rather than happiness. Meanwhile, Stanley decides to change up his narration.
7	"A New Neighbor"	Paul Bogart	Terrence McNally	June 9, 1984	82-105
New neighbor Calvin (Paul Benedict) hits the roof when he finds a bag of garbage in the hallway, and the situation escalates until Mama's dish is ruined and he's accused of being gay. Rank:64 Rating/Share: 4.6/11
8	"Shall We Dance?"	Paul Bogart	Terrence McNally	June 16, 1984	82-108
Calvin asks Mama Malone to a dance, but when she declines, Nedda steps in. Meanwhile, Connie takes football quarterback Johnny Jupiter to the dance, Dino auditions for an opera, and Frankie gets a job at a bowling alley. Rank: 66 Rating/Share: 5.1/12
9	"Even Dino Gets the Blues"	Paul Bogart	Terrence McNally	June 23, 1984	82-103
Dino says he's suicidal because he was booed off of the stage, but a deeper probe reveals that he suffered from erectile dysfunction. Meanwhile, Austin threatens to move the show to a studio if Mama can't complete her recipe. Rank: 62 Rating/Share: 4.5/10
10	"Connie's Move"	Paul Bogart	Richard Freiman	June 30, 1984	82-109
Everyone flips out when they learn that the school's stern nun, Sister Philomena (Sudie Bond), is on her way over, but it's only to encourage Connie to transfer Frankie into a prestigious Manhattan school. Rank: 62 Rating/Share: 6.1/14
11	"Dino's Fan"	Paul Bogart	Harriett Weiss & Patt Shea	July 7, 1984	82-111
A deranged fan (Beverly Archer) shows up claiming to be Dino's girlfriend. Rank: 64 Rating/Share: 4.7/11
12	"A Call from the Vatican"	Paul Bogart	Terrence McNally	July 14, 1984	82-110
Mama orchestrates an 80th birthday party for Padre Guardiano that she hopes will include a phone call from the Pope. Rank: 60 Rating/Share: 3.7/9
13	"Back to Basics"	Paul Bogart	Terrence McNally	July 21, 1984	82-113
After learning that they're being awarded Brooklyn's Outstanding American Family of the Year, Mama Malone attempts to shoot a focused show with her family, but when a food fight erupts, she loses her cool. Rank: 56 Rating/Share: 4.9/11

== Reception ==
Reviews were mixed. Both McNally and producer Richard Lewis claimed that the early notices were glowing, with Lewis claiming that CBS president Harvey Shephard was so impressed that he showed it at his class reunion, and that a Hong Kong critic wrote that he felt "happily compelled to stand up and salute" the show. However, it was speculated that it sat on the shelf so long due to a poor critical reaction, and one viewer at an ad-buyer's convention was quoted as saying, "It doesn't belong on the air." Critic William Beamon wrote, "I didn't like Mama Malone way back when it was supposed to join the network's schedule during the 1982 fall season. Nearly a year and a half later, I still don't."

On the flipside, The New York Times' John J. O'Connor gave it a favorable review, stating, "Miss Kaye is a marvel." Associated Press critic Fred Rothenberg remarked that it's "not an especially funny sitcom, but it is worth a look anyway because of its innovative format, family warmth (though exaggerated), and the dynamic performance of its star."
