= Five Nights in Maine =

2015 film

- Film poster
- Directed by: Maris Curran
- Written by: Maris Curran
- Starring: David Oyelowo
- Distributed by: FilmRise
- Release dates: September 13, 2015 (TIFF); August 5, 2016 (United States)
- Running time: 82 minutes
- Country: United States
- Language: English

Five Nights in Maine is a 2015 American drama film written and directed by Maris Curran. It was screened in the Discovery section of the 2015 Toronto International Film Festival.

== Plot ==
After his dearest wife Fiona is suddenly killed in a car accident due to a traffic jam, Sherwin Owens goes to Maine to stay with his terminally ill mother-in-law, Lucinda, so they can grieve together. However, Lucinda is resentful and distant, and Sherwin later discovers that she herself feels confronting guilt and grief over her daughter's death.

== Cast ==
- David Oyelowo as Sherwin Owens
- Teyonah Parris as Penelope
- Dianne Wiest as Lucinda
- Rosie Perez as Ann
- Bill Raymond as George
- Hani Furstenberg as Fiona Owens
- Neal Lerner as John
- Youness Zakaria as Jamal
- Bobby Moreno as Juan (voice)
- Graham Hults as Cop (voice)

== Reception ==
The A V Club says it is "admirable in its avoidance of easy sentiment", but concludes "the less-is-more approach doesn’t entirely work here". Observer calls Five Nights in Maine "inconsequential" and "disappointing". The Wrap notes the detachment in the film, saying "'Five Nights in Maine' is as frustrating as it is mannered; we never see these characters truly engaging the pain they clearly feel." A review in Maine Today says "The film is like a short story, in that we are presented with this snapshot of two lives and are left to fill in much of the meaning and the context. Processed that way, what can seem inconsequential or thin in traditional movie terms sticks with you." Variety describes it as a "tasteful, challenging yet ultimately inscrutable debut feature [that] never quite lives up to the caliber of her fine cast."
