= Picture of You =

Picture of You may refer to:

- Picture of You (album), a 2007 album by Ben Mills, or its title track
- "Picture of You" (Boyzone song), 1997
- "Picture of You", a song by Diesel on the 1992 album Hepfidelity
- "Picture of You", a song by My Morning Jacket on the 1999 album The Tennessee Fire
- "Picture of You", a song by Elwood
- "Picture of You", a song by Mr Hudson and The Library on the 2007 album A Tale of Two Cities

== See also ==
- A Picture of You (disambiguation)
- Pictures of You (disambiguation)
