= Trick Baby =

1972 film

- Directed by: Larry Yust
- Written by: Novel: Iceberg Slim; Screenplay: A. Neuberg; T. Raewyn; Larry Yust
- Produced by: Marshal Backlar; James Levitt
- Starring: Kiel Martin; Mel Stewart
- Production company: Cinema Entertainment
- Distributed by: Universal Pictures
- Release date: December 1972
- Running time: 89 minutes
- Country: United States
- Language: English

Trick Baby is a 1972 Blaxploitation film directed by Larry Yust and starring Kiel Martin and Mel Stewart. This crime-drama is based and named after a novel by Iceberg Slim written in 1967. The film was produced by Marshal Backlar and James Levitt. The film first premiered at the DeMille Theater, Seventh Avenue and 47th Street theatre, Juliet 2 Theater, and Third Avenue and 83 Street theatre in New York. This film is distributed by Universal Studios.

== Plot ==
"Blue" Howard (Mel Stewart) and "White Folks" (Kiel Martin) are two con men in Philadelphia. Blue is an older black hustler who raised "White Folks” and taught him "the con". White Folks is the son of a black mother who is a prostitute and a white father. White Folks has a complexion light enough for him to pass as a white man which gives him an advantage in the con. The duo exploit the dynamics between whites and blacks to achieve their cons. Blue usually plays a vulnerable black man being exploited by White Folks which allows Folks to gain the credibility needed to pull off the con.

== Cast ==
- Kiel Martin as "White Folks"
- Mel Stewart as "Blue" Howard
- Vernee Watson-Johnson as Cleo Howard
- Beverly Ballard as Susan
- Clebert Ford as Josephus
- David Thomas as Frascatti
- Jim King as "Duke"
- Ted Lange as Melvin, The Pimp
- Jan Leighton as Carlson
- Dallas Edwards Hayes as Dot Murray
- Tony Mazzadra as Nino Parelli
- Don Symington as Morrison
- Don Fellows as Phillips
- Tom Anderson as Felix "The Fixer"
- Charles Weldon as Tough

== Background and production ==
Trick Baby is adapted from a book by Iceberg Slim. Slim, born Robert Lee Maupin, was a pimp in his early life before becoming a popular author for African American audiences. His novels reflect his personal experiences and provides an insider look into the world of black pimps. Trick Baby, his second novel published by Holloway House in 1967, was not a direct look into the life of pimps but was still heavily influenced by pimping (remember a trick baby is the product of pimping). Slim became one of the best-selling authors of his time selling over six million books.

This is the first one of Slim's novels to be turned into a film. The script was adapted from the book by A. Neuberg, T. Raewyn, and Larry Yust. The film was also directed by Yust. The movie was produced with a $600,000 budget and was produced independently. Universal Pictures bought the film for 1,000,000 dollars and the movie grossed $11,000,000 at the US box office. The cast was not well known before the movie's release.

An adaptation of Pimp, his first novel, has been in the works for some time, since the early 1990s, but have never come to fruition. Another one of his novels, Mama Black Widow, is in development with the screenplay being adapted by Marshall Tyler who is also set to direct the piece.

== Reception ==
Critic Rossi Jackson of the New Pittsburgh Courier calls this adaption a "bastardized version of Iceberg Slim's novel…they have watered down, misadapted and ultimately messed up Iceberg Slim's original work". While Jackson claims that the film is well acted, he believes that the film lacks the ferociousness and passion with which Slim writes about the "places and the pains of the black ghetto experience". The black ghetto life is largely absent from the movie and many of the exciting characters, such as Cleo, are lost.

Jackson praises the performance of Dallas Edward Hayes (the corrupt cop) and Mel Stewart (Blue Howard), but states that Kiel Martin's performance falls short. Left to our own imaginations in the book, Folks' black identity is not questioned. However, in the movie, Martin plays the white man well, but lacks the soul needed to play a black man. Jackson states "since the credibility of the whole film rests on the actor's performance in the title role, this film falls flat on its face. Even if the leading actor were really black, one would still question his ability as an actor to credibly project black masculinity on the screen".

In a 1973 review in the New York Times, Roger Greenspun wrote "Trick Baby seems most interesting in its understanding of race relations…relations between Folks and Blue are absolutely normal, not very competitive, resilient, and rich in a kind of mutual professional appreciation."

== See also ==
- List of American films of 1972
