= Jeff Tamarkin =

American music writer

Jeff Tamarkin is an American editor, author and historian specializing in music and popular culture.

== Career ==
For 15 years Tamarkin was editor of Goldmine, a magazine for record and CD collectors. Prior to that, he served as the first editor of CMJ (College Media Journal) and as editor of Relix. He was also the first editor of Grateful Dead Comix, and has written for many other publications, including Billboard, Pulse, Boston Phoenix, Newsweek Japan, Playbill, Creem, BAM Magazine, Tidal (service), Spirit, Mojo, M: Music & Musicians, East Bay Express, The Aquarian Weekly, Newsday, Sing Out, Tracks, Harp, The New York Daily News and ICE. He has contributed to the Guinness Encyclopedia of Popular Music and Allmusic and has written program notes for Carnegie Hall and Jazz at Lincoln Center.

Tamarkin has interviewed more than 1,000 musicians and other entertainment figures.

Tamarkin has written the liner notes for more than 75 CDs, for such artists as The Beach Boys, Tom Jones, Jefferson Airplane, Dick Clark, The J. Geils Band, Chubby Checker, Merle Haggard, Dean Martin, Charlie Gracie, Steve Earle, Commander Cody and His Lost Planet Airmen, Bob Lind and many others, including ABKCO Records' Cameo-Parkway label reissue series. He has also served on the Nominating Committee of the Rock and Roll Hall of Fame and as a consultant to the Grammys.

As a consultant to the Music Club CD label, he assisted in releasing over 180 reissues and compilations, in styles including rock, jazz, country, world music and pop.

After writing short books on Billy Joel and Bruce Springsteen, his first full-length book, Got a Revolution! The Turbulent Flight of Jefferson Airplane (Atria Books), was published in June 2003. The first biography of the San Francisco band, it was written with the cooperation of all of the band members and placed the Airplane into the context of their times, the volatile 1960s. Got a Revolution was named one of the best books of 2003 by the San Francisco Chronicle and the Boston Phoenix, and received very positive reviews from, among others, Publishers Weekly, Kirkus Reviews, Austin Chronicle, New York Daily News, and The Onion. It was published in paperback in July 2005. Tamarkin collaborated with Howard Kaylan, the lead vocalist of '60s/'70s groups the Turtles, The Mothers of Invention and Flo & Eddie, on Kaylan's autobiography, "Shell Shocked: My Life with the Turtles, Flo and Eddie, and Frank Zappa, etc." It was published in March 2013 by Backbeat Books.

From 2002-2006, Tamarkin was editor-in-chief of Global Rhythm, the leading magazine for world music and global culture, in which he also wrote about music, film, cuisine, politics and other topics. In 2007 Tamarkin was named Associate Editor of JazzTimes magazine, a position he held until 2016 while simultaneously freelancing for many outlets. He was named editor of the BestClassicBands.com website in July 2016.

Tamarkin's most recent book is "Carlos Santana: Love, Devotion, Surrender: The Illustrated Story of Santana's Musical Journey," published in May 2025 by Insight Editions.

== Personal life ==
He lives in Hoboken, New Jersey, with his wife, the novelist, editor and book reviewer Caroline Leavitt. Their son, Max, is a manager at Brooklyn Academy of Music (BAM) in Brooklyn.
