= Randee Heller =

American actress (born 1947)

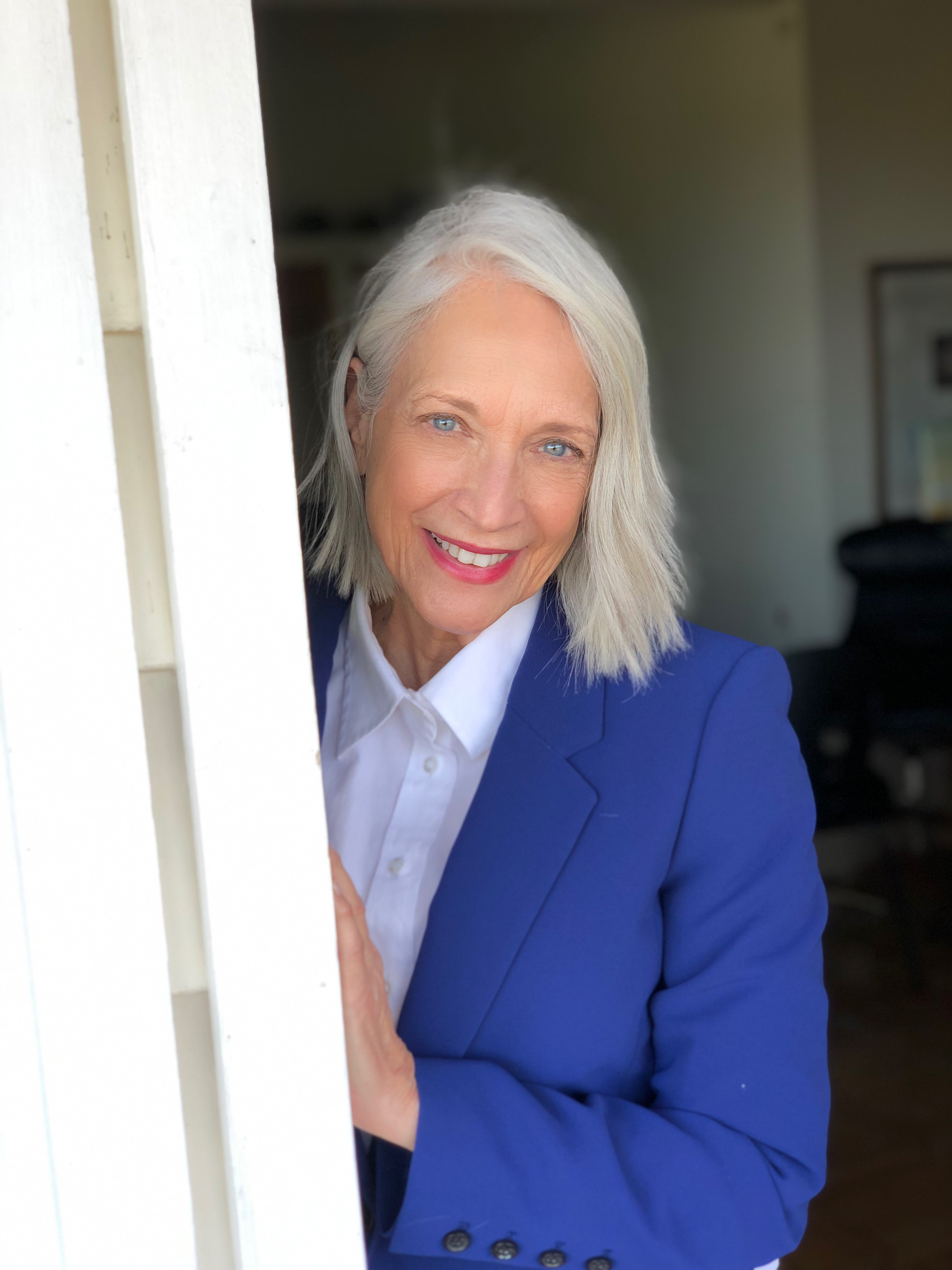
- Heller in 2018
- Born: Randee Antzis; June 10, 1947 (age 79); Brooklyn, New York, U.S.
- Education: Emerson College; Adelphi University
- Occupation: Actress
- Years active: 1971–present
- Partner: Robert Griffard
- Children: 2

Randee Heller (born Randee Antzis; June 10, 1947) is an American television and film actress. Her first high-profile role was as Alice in the 1970s sitcom Soap, portraying one of television's first lesbian characters.

Heller is also known for her portrayal of Lucille LaRusso in the films The Karate Kid and The Karate Kid Part III and in the streaming series Cobra Kai, as well as her appearances as Bert Cooper's and Don Draper's elderly secretary Ida Blankenship on the series Mad Men, for which she was nominated for Primetime Emmy Award for Outstanding Guest Actress in a Drama Series.

== Early life ==
Heller was born on June 10, 1947, in Brooklyn, New York City, and grew up in West Hempstead, New York, on Long Island, of Russian Jewish heritage. After initially attending Emerson College in Boston, she returned to Long Island to graduate in 1969 from Adelphi University, where she studied theater.

== Career ==
The summer after graduation, Heller was cast in an Off-Broadway production of Godspell. She assumed the role of Rizzo in the Broadway musical production of Grease. In 1978, Heller moved from New York to California to pursue film and television work.

Heller's role as Alice, one of the television's first lesbian characters, on the TV series Soap received mixed reviews, with criticism primarily directed not at her acting but at the stereotyping of her character. The Boston Herald said that the characterization shows how "the networks have generally depicted lesbians either as suicidal losers or sexual predators." For example, it identifies Alice as "TV's first recurring lesbian character," noting that she "first tries to throw herself off a bridge, then falls for Jodie (Billy Crystal), a confused gay man, and finally runs off." Ahead of filming, producers ordered Heller's newly permed hair straightened at the network's insistence. Of a later episode in which Alice introduces her girlfriend, Heller said, "I went to kiss her in rehearsals and they said, 'No no no … you can’t do that.' I said, 'But she’s my girlfriend!' 'No, no no no, we can’t do that, we just cannot do that.' So it was so careful, it was so delicate in those days that you couldn’t really do your thing. … They wanted me to be a heterosexual homosexual." Heller would appear as a lesbian character again in a 2010 episode of Grey's Anatomy "Almost Grown," playing the partner of a female patient with a brain tumor.

=== Film career ===
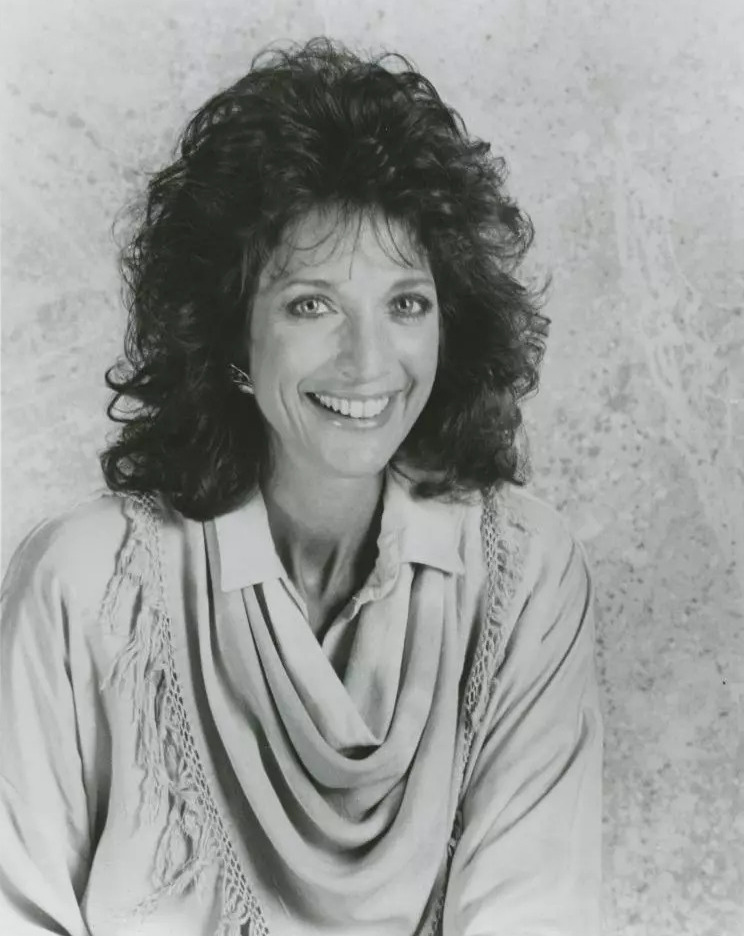
Heller as Helen Russell in Second Chance in 1987

After leaving Soap, Heller gained the role of Lucille LaRusso, the mother of Daniel LaRusso (Ralph Macchio), in the Karate Kid movie series, appearing in the first and, as a cameo, third installments, to positive notices from critics. Reviewer Gene Siskel of the Chicago Tribune noted her absence from the second film, "Heller's honest portrayal of a single parent trying to raise an adolescent was one of the genuine pleasures of the original film." Ralph Macchio also "argued for her [inclusion]. Those scenes with her were some of my favorites in the original – they had some real emotion – and I honestly don't know why she isn't there." Heller was also the voice that says "Hey Rock, you're a bum" in the first Rocky movie.

Other films include Fast Break (1979), Bulworth (1998), Monster-in-Law (2005), and Crazylove (2005).

=== Television guest appearances ===
Heller had a starring role as Carol in the 1979 TV movie Can You Hear the Laughter? The Story of Freddie Prinze. She has made guest appearances in television series including Murder, She Wrote, Less Than Perfect, ALF, Nip/Tuck, Judging Amy, Felicity, the children's series Drake & Josh, Night Court, Fame, and The White Shadow. Heller was a regular on the one-season program Husbands, Wives & Lovers (1978). She played leading roles in three short-lived sitcoms: Mama Malone (1984), 1986's Better Days (TV series), and Second Chance (1987). Heller's TV-movie appearances include Can You Hear the Laughter? The Story of Freddie Prinze and And Your Name is Jonah (both 1979). She had a recurring role in the fourth season (2010) of AMC's Mad Men as Bert Cooper's and Don Draper's elderly secretary Ida Blankenship. For this role, Heller received an Emmy nomination for Outstanding Guest Actress in a Drama Series. Additionally, she played the recurring role of Ryan's neighbor Margot on the American version of Wilfred in the 2010s.

Since 2018, Heller has reprised the role of Lucille LaRusso in the streaming show Cobra Kai.

=== Stage career ===
Heller has appeared in such theater productions as Bermuda Avenue Triangle, The Tale of the Allergist's Wife, and Cabaret. Of her role in Cabaret, with one reviewer remarked that:

...she proved in her first five minutes that she knows how to develop a character, command a stage and deliver a song. Heller made a role that seems peripheral in some productions into a central part of the story. When her engagement to her Jewish beau, Herr Schultz, is called off, it symbolizes many of the small human tragedies brought about by Nazi hate.

Heller also played the role of Barbra Streisand's mother in the stage performances of Streisand's Timeless concerts in 2000. She performed the role after having been diagnosed with breast cancer the year before and undergoing a double mastectomy and chemotherapy and radiation treatments.

== Personal life ==
Heller has been in a long-term relationship with TV writer-producer and former mime Robert Griffard and has two daughters.

== Filmography ==
=== Film ===
Year	Title	Role	Directed by	Notes
1979	Fast Break	Jan	Jack Smight	Film debut
1984	The Karate Kid	Lucille LaRusso	John G. Avildsen	
1986	The Ladies Club	Harriet	Janet Greek	
1989	The Karate Kid Part III	Lucille LaRusso	John G. Avildsen	
1993	The Baby Doll Murders	Mrs. Maglia	Paul Leder	
1994	Frame-Up II: The Cover-Up	Ruth Epstein	Paul Leder	Alternatively titled "Deadly Conspiracy"
1997	Matter of Trust	Stoddard	Joey Travolta	
1998	Bulworth	Mrs. Tannenbaum	Warren Beatty	
2005	Monster-in-Law	Beverly Hills Dog Owner	Robert Luketic	
2005	Better Days	Harriet Winners	Raul Ingils	
2005	Crazylove	Principal Gail	Ellie Kanner	
2009	Coma	Doug's Mother	Drew Antzis	Voice Role
2017	A Crooked Somebody	Phylis	Trevor White	
2024	Destroy All Neighbors	Eleanor Prescott	Josh Forbes	
2024	Murder at Hollow Creek	Glenda	David Lipper	

=== Television ===
Year	Title	Role	Notes
1977	Husbands and Wives	Rita Bell	TV Movie
1978	Husbands, Wives & Lovers	Rita DeLatorre	Season 1 (10 episodes)
1979	...and Your Name Is Jonah	Connie	TV Movie
1979	Supertrain	Tammie Tyler	Season 1, episode 5: "Superstar"
1979	240-Robert	Joan Laurent	Season 1, episode 3: "Bathysphere"
1979	Soap	Alice	Recurring role • Seasons 2 & 3 (9 episodes)
1979	Can You Hear the Laughter? The Story of Freddie Prinze	Carol	TV Movie
1980	The White Shadow	Susan	Season 2, episode 17: "The Stripper"
1980	Number 96	Marion Quintzel	Unknown episode(s) • adaptation of the Australian soap opera
1981	Quincy, M.E.	Iris	Season 7, episode 5: "D.U.I"
1982	Today's FBI	Vivian	Season 1, episode 9: "A Woman's Story"
1983	Amanda's	Barbara Mehrin	Season 1, episode 7: "Last of the Red Hot Brothers"
1984	Oh Madeline	Faye Rollins	Season 1, episode 16: "Ladies' Night Out"
1984	Mama Malone	Connie Malone Karamkopoulos	Main role • Season 1 (13 episodes)
1984	Night Court	Anita Fries	Season 2, episode 1: "The Nun"
1985	Obsessed With A Married Woman	Rita	TV Movie
1985	Hunter	Peg Sullivan	Season 2, episode 5: "Killer in a Halloween Mask"
1985	Night Court	Renee	Season 3, episode 11: "Walk Away, Renee"
1985–86	Fame	Peggy Persky	Recurring role • season 5 (3 episodes)
1986	Better Days	Harriet Winners	Main role • season 1 (11 episodes)
1987	The Last Fling	Mimi	TV Movie
1987	The Bronx Zoo	Jeannie	Recurring role • season 1 (2 episodes)
1987–88	Second Chance	Helen Russell	Main role • season 1 (21 episodes)
1989	ALF	Elaine Ochmonek	Season 3, episode 23: "Have You Seen Your Mother, Baby, Standing in the Shadow?"
1989–90	Who's the Boss	Carol	Recurring role • season 6 (2 episodes)
1990	Major Dad	Lt. Colonel Maggie Connell	Season 1, episode 15: "That Connell Woman"
1990	Midnight Caller	Katie McGill	Recurring role • season 2 (2 episodes)
1990	His & Hers	Lynn	Season 1, episode 1: "Pilot"
1990	The Fanelli Boys	Viva Fontaine	Season 1, episode 6: "Take My Ex-Wife, Please"
1990	WIOU	Janet Harper	Season 1, episode 3: "The Inquisition"
1991	Changes	Carol Kellerman	TV Movie
1991	Pacific Station	Charlotte	Season 1, episode 4: "Love and Death"
1991	Murder, She Wrote	Lt. Cynthia Devereaux	Season 8, episode 5: "Lines of Excellence"
1993	Camp Wilder	Mom	Season 1, episode 15: "Bringing Up Brody"
1993	Melrose Place	Police Detective Altman	Season 2, episode 2: "A Long Night's Journey"
1994	The Mommies	Gary / Mary	Season 1, episode 20: "Valentine's Day"
1994	Love & War	Marjorie	Season 3, episode 5: "A New York Yankee in Queen Dana's Court"
1994	ER	Mrs. Goldberg	Season 1, episode 11: "The Gift"
1996	High Incident	Unknown / unnamed role	Season 2, episode 5: "The Godfather"
1996	Family Matters	Judge Jennifer Mooney	Season 8, episode 12: "The Jury"
1997	Ink	Woman	Season 1, episode 14: "Life Without Mikey"
1997	Crisis Center	Grocer's Mother	Season 1, episode 1: "The Center"
1997	Coach	Kathi	Season 9, episode 20: "The Neighbor Hood"
1997	Fired Up	Tina	Recurring role • season 2 (3 episodes)
1999	Clueless	Judge Geyser	Season 3, episode 18: "Big Sissies"
1999	Chicago Hope	Pam Miller	Season 6, episode 2: "Y'Gotta Have Heart"
2000	Family Law	Jessica Bronson	Season 1, episode 18: "Necessity"
2001	Jack & Jill	Mrs. Weyman	Season 2, episode 6: "Pressure Points"
2001	Popular	Judy Julian	Recurring role • season 2 (2 episodes)
2001	Judging Amy	Ms. Pankow (uncredited)	Season 3, episode 4: "The Right Thing To Do"
2002	Felicity	Psychiatrist	Season 4, episode 21: "Felicity, Interrupted"
2002	Judging Amy	Ms. Madsen (uncredited)	Season 4, episode 10: "People of the Lie"
2003	Less Than Perfect	Mrs. Ross	Season 2, episode 3: "It Takes a Pillage"
2003	Judging Amy	Paige Lange's Attorney	Season 5, episode 8: "The Long Goodbye"
2004	Drake & Josh	Grammy Nichols	Season 1, episode 6: "Grammy"
2004	The Stones	Lila	Season 1, episode 3: "The Lawyer Trap"
2004	The Division	Paul's Attorney	Season 4, episode 20: "Be Careful What You Wish For"
2004	Clubhouse	Interviewer	Season 1, episode 4: "Trade Talks"
2005	Judging Amy	Evelyn Pankow	Season 6, episode 13: "Dream a Little Dream"
2005	Crossing Jordan	Julie Harvey	Season 4, episode 14: "Gray Murders"
2006	Nip/Tuck	Saleswoman	Season 4, episode 5: "Dawn Budge"
2009	Brothers & Sisters	Karin	Season 3, episode 24: "Mexico"
2009	Hawthorne	Shirley Riddle	Season 1, episode 9: "Mother's Day"
2010	Mad Men	Ida Blankenship	Recurring role • season 4 (5 episodes)
2010	Grey's Anatomy	Joanne Ratigan	Season 7, episode 5: "Almost Grown"
2011	Honey and Joy	Dottie	Television short
2011	In Plain Sight	Dora Alpert	Recurring role • season 4 (3 episodes)
2011	Desperate Housewives	Karen	Season 8, episode 5: "The Art of Making Art"
2011	Prime Suspect	Mrs. Minoff	Season 1, episode 7: "Wednesday's Child" • adaptation of the British TV series
2011	Generator Rex	Additional voices	Season 3, episode 5: "Phantom of the Soap Opera"
2012	The Mentalist	Marta Roman	Season 5, episode 8: "Red Sails in the Sunset"
2013	Emily Owens, M.D.	Maggie	Season 1, episode 13: "Emily and... the Leap"
2013	Modern Family	Rita	Season 5, episode 8: "ClosetCon '13
2013–14	Wilfred	Margot	Recurring role • seasons 3 & 4 (4 episodes) • adaptation of the Australian TV series
2014	Partners	Judge Miller	Season 1, episode 1: "They Come Together"
2016	Mary + Jane	Aunt Grace	Season 1, episode 3: "Sn**chelorette"
2017	Major Crimes	Julia	Season 6, episode 11: "By Any Means: Part 2"
2018–2025	Cobra Kai	Lucille LaRusso	Guest role (seasons 1–2, 4 6)
2018	The Resident	Yvonne	Season 1, episode 13: "Run, Doctor, Run"
2019	Station 19	Maria	Season 2, episode 17: "Into The Wildfire"
2019	The Edge of Sleep	Additional voices	2 Episodes

=== Additional credits ===
Television film

- Husbands and Wives ... as Rita Bell (1977)
- ...And Your Name is Jonah ... as Connie (1979)
- Can You Hear the Laughter? The Story of Freddie Prinze ... as Carol (1979)
- Obsessed with a Married Woman ... as Rita (1985)
- The Last Fling ... as Mimi (1987)
- Changes ... as Carol Kellerman (1991)

Short film

- Coma ... as Doug's Mother (2009)
- Haunted with a View ... unknown / unnamed role (2011)

Selected theatre credits

- Grease ... as Betty Rizzo (replacement) (February 14, 1972 – April 13, 1980)
- Hurry Harry ... as Helena / writer / Native No. 4 / Not-So-Grand Lama / Gypsy (October 12, 1972 – October 13, 1972)
