= Pictures of You =

Pictures of You may refer to:

- "Pictures of You" (The Cure song), 1990
- "Pictures of You" (The Last Goodnight song), 2007
- "Pictures of You", a 2013 song by Bon Jovi on the album What About Now
- "Pictures of You", a 2008 song by Bad Boys Blue on the album Heart & Soul
- "Pictures of You", a 1983 song by Oingo Boingo on the album Good for Your Soul
- "Pictures of You" (One Tree Hill), an episode of One Tree Hill
- Pictures of You, a novel by Caroline Leavitt
- Pictures of You (TV series), an Australian television series

== See also ==
- Picture of You (disambiguation)
