= Jodi Long =

American actress

- Long in 2026
- Born: January 7, 1954 (age 72); New York City, New York, U.S.
- Education: State University of New York at Purchase (BFA)
- Occupation: Actress
- Years active: 1962–present

Jodi Long (born January 7, 1954) is an American film, stage, and television actress. She is best known for her roles as Madame Ybarra on Café Americain (1993–1994), Mrs. Kim on the Margaret Cho sitcom All-American Girl (1994-1995), Ok Cha on Sullivan & Son (2012–2014), as well as her portrayal of Wendy Yoshimura in Paul Schrader's biographical thriller film Patty Hearst (1988). She won Best Supporting Actress at the Daytime Emmy Awards for her role in the Netflix series Dash & Lily (2020).

== Early life, family and education ==
Long is a native of New York City: born in 1954 in Manhattan and raised in Queens, the daughter of Kimiye "Trudie" Long (née Tsunemitsu; died 2014) and Australian former vaudevillian Lawrence K. Long (stage name Larry Leung). Her mother was born and raised in Portland, Oregon, the daughter of Japanese immigrant parents; despite her brother's service in the U.S. Military during World War II, the Tsunemitsu family was relocated to the Minidoka Internment Camp in Idaho, where Trudie resided for one year before moving to New York City. In New York, Trudie found employment at the American Bible Society and as a dancer at The China Doll night club. Long's father was of mixed Cantonese and Scottish descent, and began his career performing in Australia's vaudeville circuit. After immigrating to the United States, he performed as half of an act called the Wing Brothers in San Francisco. He also had a career as a tap-dancer and later as a PGA golf professional.

Her parents appeared on The Ed Sullivan Show on May 7, 1950, as the singing, dancing, comedy act Larry and Trudie Leung. Long's parents divorced during her childhood. They later reunited for a documentary film, Long Story Short, which was written by their daughter and directed by Christine Choy, an Academy Award-nominated director. The documentary won the 2008 Los Angeles Asian Pacific Film Festival's Grand Jury's Honorable Mention for a Documentary Award as well as the Audience Award.

Jodi Long graduated from Manhattan's High School of Performing Arts, and then earned a BFA in drama from the State University of New York at Purchase, graduating in 1976.

== Career ==
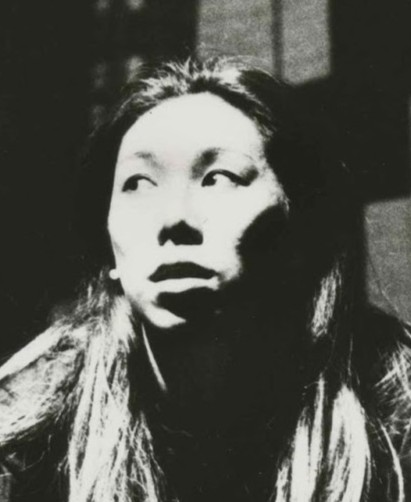
Long in a 1988 production of 1000 Airplanes on the Roof

=== Early stage and film roles ===
Long began acting as a child, appearing in a Sidney Lumet-directed Broadway production of Nowhere to Go but Up in 1962.

In 1979, she appeared again on Broadway as Selina in Loose Ends, followed by The Bacchae (1980), both staged at the Circle in the Square Theatre.

She made her feature film debut in Alan J. Pakula's thriller film Rollover (1981). Towards the end of the music video for the 1986 song "Bizarre Love Triangle" by the English rock band New Order, Long makes a cameo appearance arguing with E. Max Frye about reincarnation.

After minor appearances in Splash (1984) and The Bedroom Window (1987), Long was cast as Wendy Yoshimura, a member of the Symbionese Liberation Army, in Paul Schrader's thriller Patty Hearst (1988), about the abduction of Patricia Hearst. The same year, she starred in Mike Newell's Soursweet. On stage, she toured internationally in 1988 performing the role of M in the drama 1000 Airplanes on the Roof.

=== Later film, television, and theater ===
Long had subsequent roles in The Exorcist III (1990), RoboCop 3 (1993), and Striking Distance (also 1993). On television, she appeared as a regular on such series as Café Americain (1993–1994) and All-American Girl (1994). In 1996, Long returned to Broadway, appearing as Nam-Jun Vuong in Stephen Sondheim and George Furth's comedy thriller play Getting Away with Murder.

On television, played a therapist in Desperate Housewives, a "power lesbian" Patty in Sex and the City and a bar owner, Ok Cha, on the TBS series Sullivan & Son, which was cancelled after three seasons on November 20, 2014.

She appeared in the 2002 Broadway revival of Flower Drum Song, winning an Ovation Award for her performance during the Los Angeles tryout. Long also had a supporting role in the comedy film The Hot Chick (2003). In 2010, Long appeared in Mike Mills' comedy film Beginners.

In 2018, she had a supporting role in HBO Films' drama The Tale, starring Laura Dern, Ellen Burstyn, and Jason Ritter. In 2021, Long had a role in Shang-Chi and the Legend of the Ten Rings, and subsequently played the role of Madame Armfeldt in the 2023 revival of A Little Night Music at the Pasadena Playhouse. In early 2026, Long starred in the play Chinese Republicans for the Roundabout Theatre Company.

== Filmography ==
=== Film ===
Year	Title	Role	Notes	Ref.
1980	Nurse	Gail	Television film	
1981	Rollover	Betsy Okamoto		
1984	Splash	Reporter		
1984	How to Be a Perfect Person in Just Three Days	Mrs. Yamata	Television film	
1987	The Bedroom Window	Cocktail Waitress		
1988	Patty Hearst	Wendy Yoshimura		
1988	Soursweet	Mui		
1989	New York Stories	T.V. Interviewer		
1989	Born on the Fourth of July	Reporter #1		
1990	The Exorcist III	First Dream Woman		
1990	How to Murder a Millionaire	Check Cashing Teller	Television film	
1993	Amos & Andrew	Wendy Wong		
1993	The Pickle	Yakimoto Yakimura		
1993	RoboCop 3	Nikko's Mom		
1993	Striking Distance	Kim Lee		
1993	Firestorm: 72 Hours in Oakland	Linda Chong	Television film	
1997	His & Hers	Corey Chang		
1997	Murder in Mind	Helen		
1998	Celebrity	Father Gladden's Fan		
2002	New Suit	Feng Shui Woman		
2002	The Hot Chick	Mrs. Jackson		
2008	Mask of the Ninja	Kumioko	Television film	
2010	Beginners	Dr. Long		
2013	A Picture of You	Mother		
2016	5 Doctors	Dr. Suzuki		
2018	The Tale	Rebecca		
2021	Shang-Chi and the Legend of the Ten Rings	Mrs. Chen		
2023	The Monkey King	Wangmu	Voice role	
2024	Night Swim	Lucy Summers		

=== Television ===
Year	Title	Role	Notes	Ref.
1982	Another World	Officer Noguchi	Episode #1.4498	
1985	The Equalizer	Mrs. Lin	Episode: "China Rain"	
1986	Scarecrow and Mrs. King	Jin Sung	Episode: "Three Little Spies"	
1988, 1990	The Cosby Show	Joann	2 episodes	
1990	Mancuso, F.B.I.	Beth Kurland	Episode: "Daryl Ross & the Supremes"	
1990	Roseanne	Woman in Line	Episode: "April Fool's Day"	
1991	L.A. Law	Christina Leong	Episode: "Speak, Lawyers, for Me"	
1992	Designing Women	Eileen Arata	Episode: "Trial and Error"	
1993–1994	Café Americain	Madame Ybarra	Main role	
1994–1995	All-American Girl	Katherine Kim	Main role	
1995	The Wayans Bros.	Angelique	Episode: "Blood Is Thicker Than Watercolor"	
1997	Michael Hayes	Joan	Recurring role	
1999	Sex and the City	Patty Aston	Episode: "The Cheating Curve"	
2000	Chicken Soup for the Soul	Rhonda	Episode: "Destiny in a Bottle"	
2001	So Little Time	Neptune's Net Owner	Episode: "Manuelo in the Middle: Part 2"	
2002	The Division	Polly Seager	Episode: "Unfamiliar Territory"	
2003	Law & Order: Special Victims Unit	Center Director	Episode: "Tortured"	
2003	Miss Match	Claire	Main role	
2005	Without a Trace	Mrs. Kim	Episode: "Honor Bound"	
2005, 2009	American Dad!	Woman (voice)	2 episodes	
2006	House	Judge	Episode: "Finding Judas"	
2008	Cashmere Mafia	Susan Mason	Episode: "The Deciders"	
2008–2009	Eli Stone	Judge Marcia Phelps	Recurring role	
2009	The Beast	May Nan Nhung	Episode: "Bitsy Big-Boy"	
2009	Eastwick	Mrs. Yang	Episode: "Madams and Madames"	
2010–2011	Law & Order: LA	Judge Sonya Cruz	3 episodes	
2011	Desperate Housewives	Dr. Lunt	Episode: "Assassins"	
2012	Franklin & Bash	Judge Noreen Poggi	Episode: "Jango and Rossi"	
2012	Made in Jersey	Judge Meisner	Episode: "Payday"	
2012–2014	Sullivan & Son	Ok Cha Sullivan	Main role	
2015	Young & Hungry	Mrs. Park	Episode: "Young and Unemployed"	
2016	The Blacklist	Col. Wright	Episode: "Dr. Adrian Shaw (No. 98)"	
2016–2018	Falling Water	Kumiko	Recurring role	
2019	Elementary	Mrs. Tseng	Episode: "Unfriended"	
2020	Curb Your Enthusiasm	Dr. Bahn	Episode: "Side Sitting"	
2020	Dash & Lily	Mrs. Basil E	3 episodes	
2023	The Mandalorian	Warlord	Episode: "Chapter 23: The Spies"	

=== Music videos ===
Year	Song	Artist	Ref.
1986	"Bizarre Love Triangle"	New Order	

== Selected stage credits ==
Year	Title	Role	Notes	Ref.
1962	Nowhere to Go But Up	Hop Family Member	Winter Garden Theatre	
1978	Hamlet	Ophelia	Everyman Company, Brooklyn	
1979	Loose Ends	Selina	Circle in the Square Theatre	
1980	The Bacchae	Chorus of Bacchae	Circle in the Square Theatre	
1983	A Midsummer Night's Dream	Titania	Pan Asian Repertory Theatre	
1985	A Midsummer Night's Dream	Helena	Musical Theater Works	
1988	1000 Airplanes on the Roof	M	Touring production	
1989	Nothing Sacred	Anna Odintsov	Hartford Stage	
1996	Getting Away with Murder	Nam-Jun Vuong	Broadhurst Theatre	
2002	Flower Drum Song	Madam Liang	Virginia Theatre	
2019	Fern Hill	Michiko	59E59 Theaters	
2023	A Little Night Music	Madame Armfeldt	Pasadena Playhouse	
2026	Chinese Republicans	Phyllis	Roundabout Theatre Company	

== Accolades ==
Award/association	Year	Category	Nominated work	Result	Ref.
Daytime Emmy Awards	2021	Outstanding Supporting Actress in a Daytime Fiction Program	Dash & Lily	Won	
Ovation Awards	2002	Featured Actress in a Musical	Flower Drum Song	Won	
