= Better Days (TV series) =

American sitcom

- Genre: Sitcom
- Created by: Jeff Freilich; Arthur Silver; Stuart Sheslow
- Starring: Raphael Sbarge; Chip McAllister; Guy Killum; Randall Batinkoff; Randee Heller; Dick O'Neill
- Composers: Jesse Frederick; Bennett Salvay
- Country of origin: United States
- Original language: English
- No. of seasons: 1
- No. of episodes: 11 (7 unaired)

Production
- Executive producers: Jeff Freilich; Stuart Sheslow
- Camera setup: Multi-camera
- Running time: 30 minutes
- Production companies: Magnum/Thunder Road Productions; Lorimar-Telepictures

Original release
- Network: CBS
- Release: October 1 – October 29, 1986

Better Days is an American sitcom that aired on CBS from October 1 to October 29, 1986.

== Summary ==
Brian McGuire is a California teenager who moves in with his grandfather, Harry in Brooklyn, New York to ease his parents' financial problems. Helping Brian adjust to his new surroundings were Luther Cain and Anthony "The Snake" Johnson, two of his street-smart teammates on the Broxton High School basketball team. Miss Winners was their cynical, no-nonsense high school English teacher. Terrance Dean was their yuppie classmate.

== Cancellation ==
Better Days was the first show of the 1986-1987 television season to be canceled. It lasted only four weeks. People magazine was highly critical of the series during its short run on CBS; in its year-end review, Jeff Jarvis, then the TV critic for the magazine, described it as "a shockingly racist sitcom that looked as if it had been produced by South African TV."

== Cast ==
- Raphael Sbarge as Brian McGuire
- Chip McAllister as Luther Cain
- Guy Killum as Anthony "The Snake" Johnson
- Randall Batinkoff as Terrance Dean
- Randee Heller as Miss Harriet Winners
- Dick O'Neill as Harry Clooney

== Episodes ==
No.	Title	Directed by	Written by	Original release date
1	"Squad R"	Joel Zwick	Story by : Jeff Freilich & Arthur Silver & Stuart Sheslow; Teleplay by : Arthur Silver	October 1, 1986
2	"Cheaters Never Win"	Bill Bixby	Rob Edwards	October 8, 1986
3	"Wendell and the Three Sure Things"	Howard Storm	David Nichols	October 15, 1986
4	"Double-D"	Stan Lathan	Ralph Farquhar	October 29, 1986
5	"Never Blow Up the World"	Bill Bixby	Ronald Rubin	Unaired
6	"A Car is Not a Home"	Mel Ferber	N/A	Unaired
7	"Ground Rules"	Bill Bixby	N/A	Unaired
8	"West Coast Girl"	Howard Storm	Marty Nadler	Unaired
9	"Wooly Bully"	Stan Lathan	Eric Blakeney & Gene Miller	Unaired
10	"29 Minutes"	Stan Lathan	Phil Kellard & Tom Moore	Unaired
11	"All Rapped Up"	Stan Lathan	Ralph Farquahar	Unaired
