= Lila Kaye =

English actress (1929–2012)

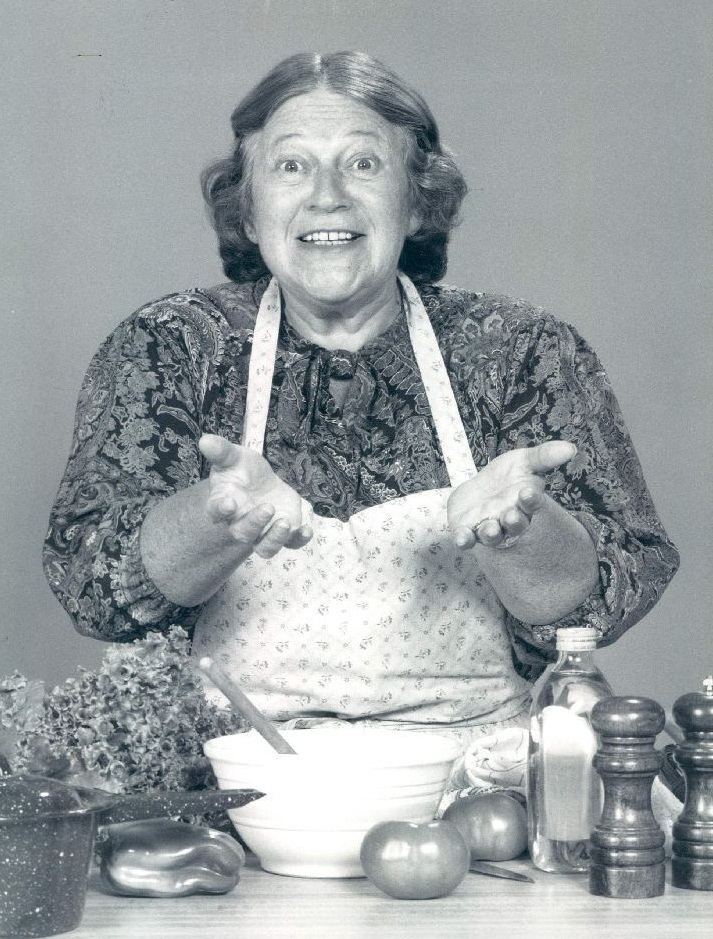
- Kaye in Mama Malone in 1984
- Born: 7 November 1929
- Died: 10 January 2012 (aged 82); Worthing, Sussex, England
- Occupation: Actress
- Children: 1

Lila Kaye (7 November 1929 – 10 January 2012) was an English actress. She spent a number of years working in the United States, on Broadway and in television, before returning to England.

She often played motherly and/or comedic characters, mostly on television, including Cathy Come Home (1966) as a staff member at a homeless shelter, and My Son Reuben (1975), co-starring Bernard Spear, as a Jewish mother and her bachelor son who jointly run a dry-cleaning business. She also appeared in films including Blind Terror (1971), The Black Panther (1977) and Quincy's Quest (1979), and found film success in later years for her performances in An American Werewolf in London (1981) as the conflicted rural barmaid trying to warn off the two doomed American backpackers, in Nuns on the Run (1990) as a formidable nun, and in Reason for Living: The Jill Ireland Story (1991; an American television film), in which she played Dorothy Ireland, the real-life mother of cancer-stricken actress Jill Ireland (played by Jill Clayburgh). Kaye appeared in Bert Rigby, You're a Fool (1989) as Mrs. Pennington, and in Dragonworld (1994) as Mrs. Cosgrove.

In 1991, Lila played headmistress Mrs. Daphne Trout in series two and the first half of series three of the children's BBC television series Bodger & Badger.

She appeared as a nurse in a notable Royal Shakespeare Company production of John Vanbrugh's play, The Relapse, at the Aldwych Theatre in London in 1967, alongside, among others, Donald Sinden, Patrick Stewart and Ben Kingsley. She debuted the role of Serafima Ilinitchna in Nikolai Erdman's The Suicide (1979). She was part of the cast of the Royal Shakespeare Company's epic stage production of Nicholas Nickleby on Broadway in 1981.

Kaye starred in the title role of the short-lived U.S. television series Mama Malone a year later. She made guest appearances on several U.S. television series, such as Murder, She Wrote, Cheers and Dear John (reuniting her with An American Werewolf In London co-star Jenny Agutter). She resided in Florida before returning to Britain. Her last role was in the British television serial Julia Jekyll and Harriet Hyde in 1998, in which she appeared as "Granny Jekyll". After this role she announced her retirement.

== Death ==
She died in Worthing, Sussex, on 10 January 2012, aged 82, following a long illness.
