= A Picture of You (film) =

- Directed by: J.P. Chan
- Written by: J.P. Chan
- Produced by: Yasmine Gomez; J.P. Chan; Robert M. Chang
- Starring: Jo Mei; Andrew Pang; Teyonah Parris; Lucas Dixon; Jodi Long
- Cinematography: Andrew Reed
- Edited by: Kevin Barker
- Music by: Yea-Ming Chen
- Release date: June 20, 2014 (Manhattan)
- Running time: 82 minutes 83 minutes
- Country: United States
- Language: English

A Picture of You is a 2014 American drama film written and directed by J.P. Chan and starring Jo Mei, Andrew Pang, Teyonah Parris, Lucas Dixon and Jodi Long.

== Cast ==
- Jo Mei as Jen
- Andrew Pang as Kyle
- Teyonah Parris as Mika
- Lucas Dixon as Doug
- Jodi Long as Mother

== Release ==
The film was released in Manhattan on June 20, 2014.

== Reception ==
The film has a 100% rating on Rotten Tomatoes based on nine reviews. Brian Tallerico of RogerEbert.com awarded the film two and a half stars.

Ronnie Scheib of Variety gave the film a positive review and wrote, "A curiously likable, entertainingly laid-back Asian-American take on all-too-familiar dysfunctional family tropes, this Kickstarter-enabled effort boldly mines farce along with sentiment."

Ben Kenigsberg of The New York Times also gave the film a positive review and wrote, "Mr. Chan’s skill with actors — particularly with Ms. Mei and Mr. Pang’s persuasive, easygoing banter — compensates for the story’s limitations."

Sheri Linden of the Los Angeles Times also gave the film a positive review and wrote, "Nimbly avoiding the excesses of melodrama and the recessiveness of mumblecore, Chan and his likably low-key cast navigate hairpin turns from drama to comedy to outright farce with an impressive sense of proportion."

Justin Lowe of The Hollywood Reporter also gave the film a positive review and wrote, "This disarmingly low-key genre-hybrid delivers both dramatically and comedically."
