= Teyonah Parris =

American actress (born 1987)

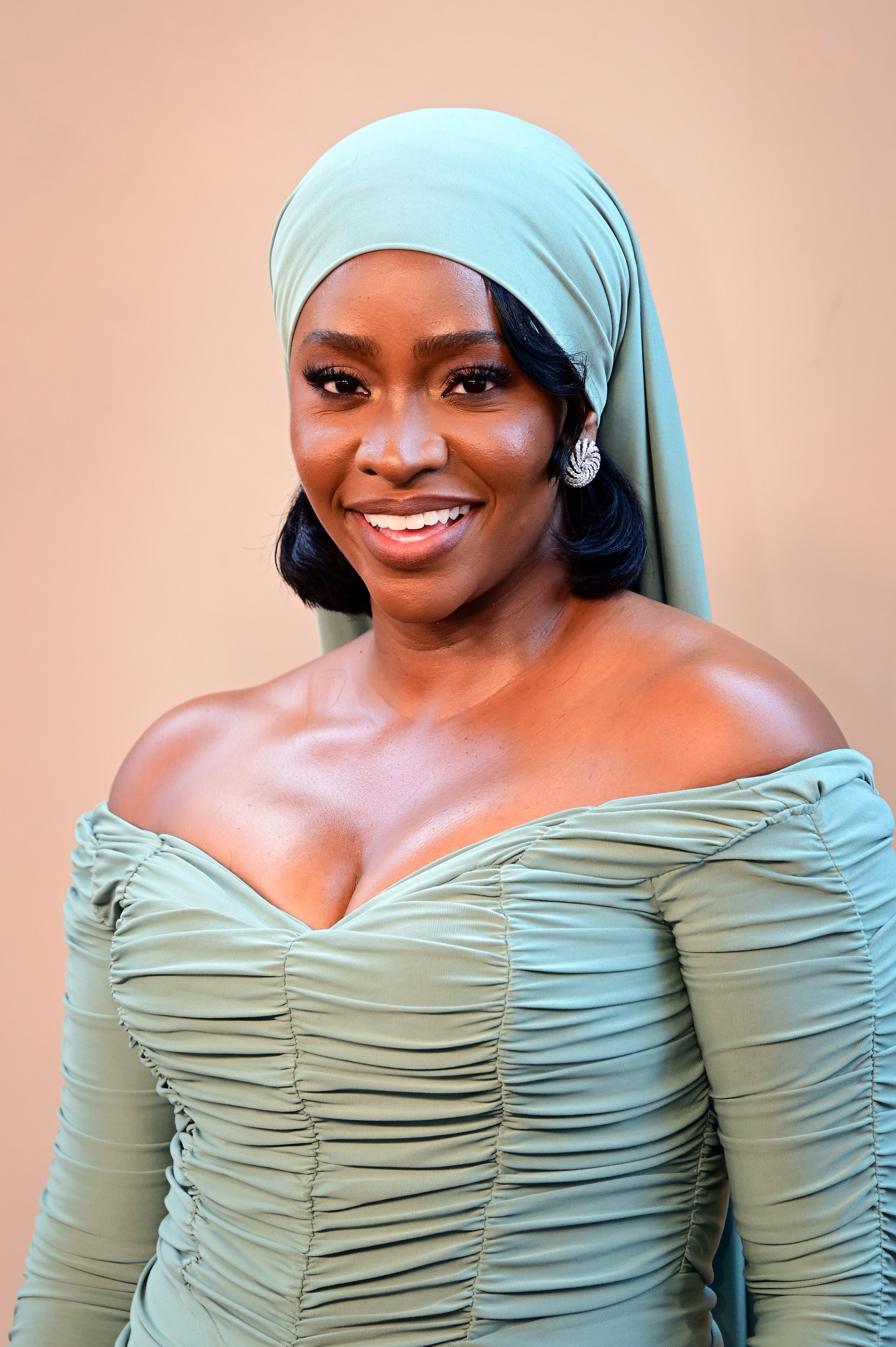
- Parris in 2026
- Born: September 22, 1987 (age 39); Hopkins, South Carolina, U.S.
- Education: Juilliard School (BFA)
- Occupation: Actress
- Years active: 2010–present
- Spouse: James Parris
- Children: 1

Teyonah Parris (/tiˈɒnə/ tee-ON-ə; born September 22, 1987) is an American actress. A graduate of Juilliard School, she began acting in 2010. Her first prominent roles were in the drama series Mad Men (2012–2015) and in the independent film Dear White People (2014). She then appeared in the drama series Empire (2014), Spike Lee's crime comedy Chi-Raq (2015), and the drama film If Beale Street Could Talk (2018).

In 2021, Parris starred in the horror film Candyman, and began portraying Monica Rambeau in the Marvel Cinematic Universe, starting with the Disney+ series WandaVision. She has since featured in the black comedy series No Good Deed (2024).

== Early life and education ==
Parris was born on September 22, 1987, and raised in Hopkins, South Carolina. She attended Lower Richland High School until her sophomore year. She was accepted into the South Carolina Governor's School for the Arts & Humanities where she finished 11th and 12th grades, before attending and graduating from the Juilliard School.

== Career ==
She made her television debut in 2010, with a guest-starring role on The Good Wife. In 2012, she was cast in a recurring role as Dawn Chambers in the AMC drama series, Mad Men. She played the first major African American character on Mad Men.

In 2014, Parris had her breakthrough role in the independent film Dear White People. Later in that year, Parris began starring in the Starz comedy series, Survivor's Remorse. In 2015, Parris went to star in the satirical drama film Chi-Raq directed by Spike Lee. She received her first NAACP Image Award for Outstanding Actress in a Motion Picture nomination for this film. She played the leading role in Where Children Play directed by Leila Djansi, and starred alongside David Oyelowo in Five Nights in Maine. Later in 2015, she played R&B/Jazz singer Miki Howard in the biopic Love Under New Management: The Miki Howard Story.

In 2016, Parris was cast as lead character in the period drama film Buffalo Soldier Girl about a woman who, disguised as a man, enlisted and fought with the African American Post Civil War era as a Buffalo Soldier. In 2017, she had a recurring role on the Fox prime time soap opera Empire playing Detective Pamela Rose. In early 2018, Parris was cast in a leading role on the CBS drama pilot Murder. Also that year, she co-starred in If Beale Street Could Talk, a drama film written and directed by Barry Jenkins and based on James Baldwin's novel of the same name. She played the lead role of Kaneisha in the 2018 Off-Broadway production of Slave Play at the New York Theatre Workshop.

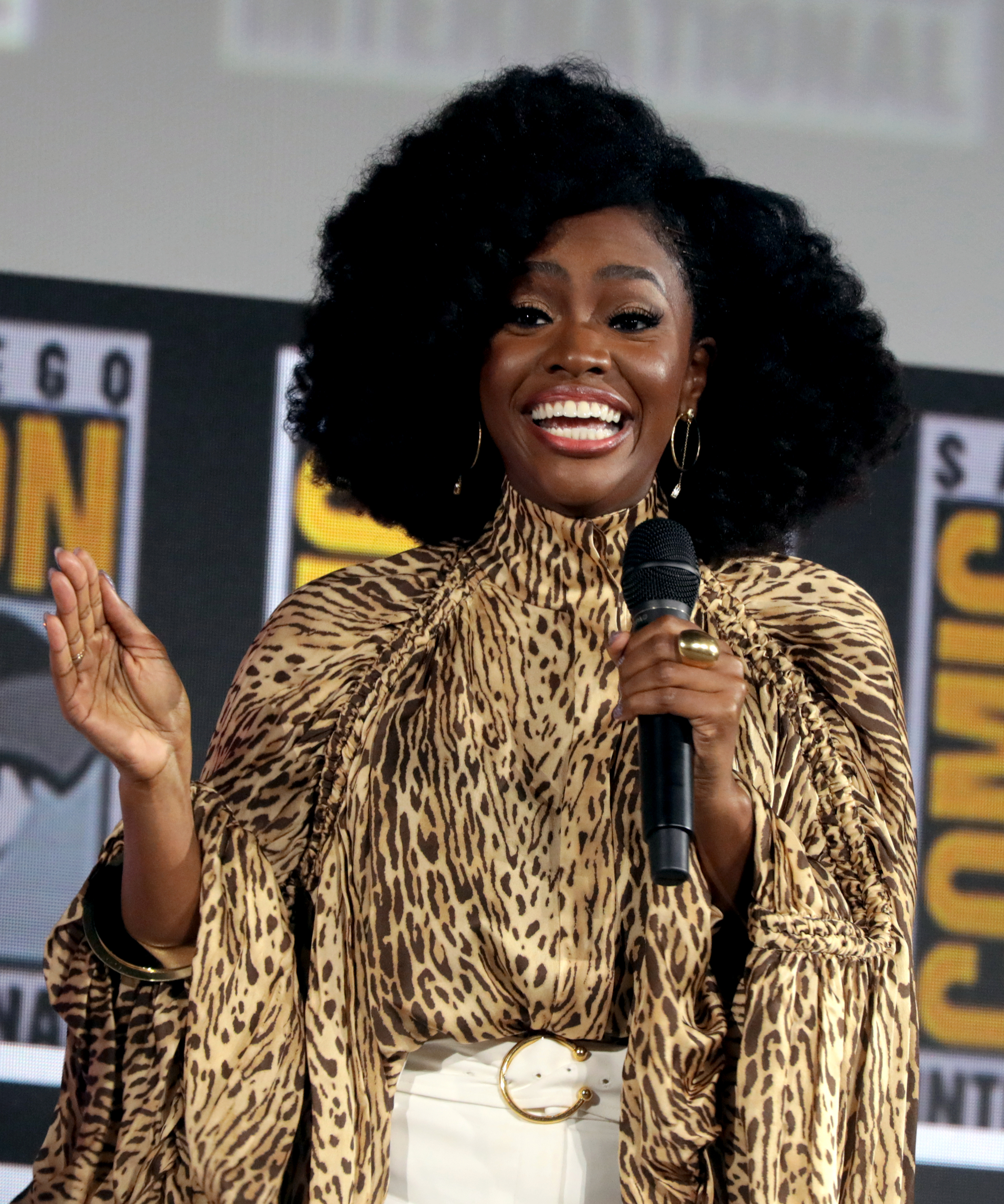
Parris in 2019

Parris plays the adult version of Monica Rambeau (introduced in the Marvel Cinematic Universe film Captain Marvel) in the Disney+ series WandaVision. She reprised the role in The Marvels released in November 2023.

== Personal life ==
In September 2022, Parris and her husband James announced that they were expecting their first child; their daughter was born in early 2023.

On August 22, 2024, Teyonah launched her hair extensions line blūm by Teyonah.

== Filmography ==
=== Film ===
Year	Title	Role	Notes
2010	How Do You Know	Riva	
2013	A Picture of You	Mika	
2014	Dear White People	Colandrea "Coco" Conners	
2014	They Came Together	Wanda	
2015	Five Nights in Maine	Penelope	
2015	Where Children Play	Bellissima Mccain	
2015	Chi-Raq	Lysistrata	
2016	Love Under New Management: The Miki Howard Story	Miki Howard	Also producer
2016	90 Days	Jessica	Short
2018	If Beale Street Could Talk	Ernestine Rivers	
2019	Point Blank	Taryn	
2020	Charm City Kings	Terri	
2020	The Photograph	Asia	
2021	Candyman	Brianna Cartwright	
2023	They Cloned Tyrone	Yo-Yo	
2023	The Marvels	Monica Rambeau	
2023	Dashing Through the Snow	Allison Garrick	
2026	Matchbox: The Movie	Charmaine	
TBA	Running †	TBA	Filming

=== Television ===
Year	Title	Role	Notes
2010	The Good Wife	Melinda Gossett	Episode: "Double Jeopardy"
2012–2015	Mad Men	Dawn Chambers	Recurring cast: season 5-7a, guest: season 7b
2013	CSI: Crime Scene Investigation	Karen Branston	Episode: "Take the Money and Run"
2014–2017	Survivor's Remorse	Missy Vaughn	Main cast
2017	Placeholders	Marla	2 episodes
2017	Empire	Detective Pamela Rose	Recurring cast: season 4
2018	Murder	Det. Ayana Lake	TV movie
2021	WandaVision	Monica Rambeau / "Geraldine"	Main cast
2021–2024	Marvel Studios: Assembled	Herself	2 episodes
2024	What If...?	Monica Rambeau (voice)	Episode: "What If... the Hulk Fought the Mech Avengers?"
2024	No Good Deed	Carla Owens	Main cast

== Awards and nominations ==
Association	Year	Work	Category	Result	Ref.
AAFCA Awards	2015	Chi-Raq	Best Actress	Won	
Black Reel Awards	2015	Dear White People	Outstanding Breakthrough Performance, Female	Won	
Black Reel Awards	2015	Dear White People	Outstanding Supporting Actress, Motion Picture	Nominated	
Black Reel Awards	2016	Chi-Raq	Outstanding Actress, Motion Picture	Won	
Black Reel Awards	2017	Love Under New Management: The Miki Howard Story	Outstanding TV Movie or Limited Series (as producer)	Nominated	
Black Reel Awards	2017	Love Under New Management: The Miki Howard Story	Outstanding Actress in a TV Movie or Limited Series	Nominated	
Black Reel Awards	2021	WandaVision	Outstanding Actress in a TV Movie or Limited Series	Nominated	
Hollywood Critics Association TV Awards	2021	WandaVision	Best Supporting Actress in a Limited Series, Anthology Series, or Television Movie	Nominated	
Hollywood Film Festival	2017	90 Days	Exceptional Emerging Artist - Acting	Won	
MTV Movie & TV Awards	2021	WandaVision	Best Hero	Nominated	
NAACP Image Awards	2016	Chi-Raq	Outstanding Actress in a Motion Picture	Nominated	
Screen Actors Guild Awards	2013	Mad Men	Outstanding Performance by an Ensemble in a Drama Series	Nominated	
Seattle Film Critics Society	2018	If Beale Street Could Talk	Best Ensemble Cast	Nominated	
Washington D.C. Area Film Critics Association	2018	If Beale Street Could Talk	Best Acting Ensemble	Nominated	
