= Iceberg Slim =

American writer and pimp (1918–1992)

Robert Beck
- Born: Robert Lee Maupin; August 4, 1918; Chicago, Illinois, U.S.
- Died: April 28, 1992 (aged 73); Los Angeles, California, U.S.
- Occupations: Pimp, author
- Spouse(s): Betty Shue (common law, 1960s); Diane Millman (1982 onwards)
- Children: 4

Robert Beck (born Robert Lee Maupin or Robert Moppins Jr.; August 4, 1918 – April 28, 1992), better known as Iceberg Slim, was an American pimp who later became a writer. Beck's 1967 memoir, Pimp: The Story of My Life, sold very well, mainly among black audiences. By 1973, it had been reprinted 19 times and had sold nearly 2 million copies. He also wrote novels such as Trick Baby.

== Early life ==
Maupin was born in Chicago, Illinois. He spent his childhood in Milwaukee, Wisconsin, and Rockford, Illinois, until he returned to Chicago. When his mother was abandoned by his father, she established a beauty shop and worked as a domestic hairstylist to support both of them in Milwaukee. In his autobiography, Maupin expressed gratitude to his mother for not also abandoning him. She earned enough money working in her salon to give her son the privileges of a middle-class life such as a college education, which at that time was difficult for the average person.

Slim attended Tuskegee University in Tuskegee, Alabama, but having spent time in street culture, he soon began bootlegging and was expelled as a result.

== Pimp activity ==
According to his memoir, Pimp, Slim started pimping at 18 and continued until age 42. The book claims that during his career he had over 400 women, both black and white, working for him. He said he was known for his frosty temperament and for staying calm in emergencies, which, combined with his slim build, earned him the street name Iceberg Slim. When verbal instruction and psychological manipulation failed to keep the women compliant, he beat them with wire hangers; in his autobiography he concedes he was a ruthless, vicious man.

Slim had been connected with several other well-known pimps, one of them Albert "Baby" Bell, a man born in 1899 who had been pimping for decades and had a Duesenberg and a bejeweled pet ocelot. Another pimp, who had got Slim hooked on cocaine, went by the name of "Satin" and was a major drug figure in the eastern part of the country.

Throughout his pimping career, Slim, who was known as Cavanaugh Slim, was noted for being able to effectively conceal his emotions, something he said he learned from Baby Bell: "A pimp has gotta know his whores, but not let them know him; he's gotta be god all the way."

Iceberg Slim retired from pimping at the age of 42 because he could no longer handle the physical and mental stress of the job, particularly when it came to managing his prostitutes, whom he said tended to have difficult personalities. In his words: "I did not want to be teased, tormented, and brutalized by young whores."

== Prison stints ==
At age 17, Slim convinced a girlfriend named in his memoir as "June" to work as a prostitute for him. His second customer recognized the girl and informed her father, and the father in turn contacted the police. Slim was sentenced to 12 to 18 months in prison for "carnal knowledge and abuse". June's father used his influence to prevent Slim from being charged with "pandering" because he did not want his daughter to be labelled a prostitute. Slim served his sentence in Wisconsin Green Bay Reformatory.

Slim returned to Milwaukee after being released. Four and a half months after he was paroled, a man named "Weeping" paid Slim $500 to have sex with a woman named "Pepper" at her house with the intent to secretly take photographs of the couple in bed and blackmail Pepper. But after Slim did the deed and was paid, he was arrested by police and accused of stealing the money from Pepper's house. Pepper testified against Slim at his trial, and Slim was convicted of burglary and sentenced to two years in prison, which he served in Waupun State Prison. He was released three months early for good behavior. Slim stated he never found out why Weeping and Pepper framed him.

== Writing ==
In 1961, after serving 10 months of solitary confinement in a Cook County jail, Maupin decided he was too old for a life of pimping at the age of 42 and was unable to compete with younger, more ruthless pimps.

In 1961, Maupin moved to Los Angeles and changed his name to Robert Beck, taking the last name of the man his mother was married to at the time. He met Betty Shue, who became his common-law wife and the mother of his three daughters, while he was working as an insecticide salesman. Betty encouraged Beck to write the story of his life as a novel, and they began sporadically writing some draft chapters. According to her, a white writer, whom Beck would later only refer to as "the Professor", became interested in writing Beck's life story; Beck became convinced that the man was trying to steal their idea for himself, so they cut him out of the deal and finished it without him. Bentley Morris of Holloway House recognized the merit of Pimp, and it was published in 1967.

The hip-hop writer Mark Skillz wrote that when Beck began work on Pimp, "he made two promises to himself: no glamorizing his former life and no snitching." Hip hop artist Fab 5 Freddy, a friend of Beck's, claimed that "Many of Bob's friends were still alive when he wrote that book. So he changed all of their names and descriptions. 'Baby' Bell became 'Sweet' Jones, his best friend 'Satin' became 'Glass Top', and he created composite characters of some of his former 'employees.'"

Reviews of Pimp were mixed. Beck's vision was considerably bleaker than most other black writers of the time: his work tended to be based on his personal experiences in the criminal underworld and revealed a world of seemingly bottomless brutality and viciousness. His was the first insider look into the world of black pimps, to be followed by a half-dozen pimp memoirs by other writers.

In 1973, Hollie West questioned in The Washington Post whether societal changes and the women's movement would soon render the outlook expressed in Pimp obsolete: "The Iceberg Slim of yesteryear is considered an anachronism to the young dudes now out there on the block trying to hustle. They say he is crude and violent, overlooking his tremendous gift of the gab. Iceberg acknowledges that pimping has changed because 'women have changed.' The advent of women's lib, changing sexual mores, general affluence in this society and widespread use of drugs by pimps to control prostitutes have made an impact."

Pimp sold very well, mainly among Black audiences. By 1973, it had been reprinted 19 times and had sold nearly 2 million copies. Pimp was eventually translated into German, French, Italian, Portuguese, Spanish, Dutch, Swedish, Finnish, and Greek.

Following Pimp, Beck wrote several more novels, an autobiography, and a story collection. He sold over six million books before his death in 1992, making him one of the best-selling African-American writers.

=== Recordings ===
In 1976, Iceberg Slim released the album Reflections, in which he recited passages from his autobiography over a funky musical backing supplied by the Red Holloway Quartet. The album, produced by David Drozen, was initially released on ALA records. It was reissued by Infinite Zero in 1994, then by Uproar Entertainment in 2008. Reviewing the album for AllMusic, Victor W. Valdivia wrote "For those who aren't easily offended, this album will be spellbinding. Slim's skills as a storyteller cannot be overstated; even at his crudest, he still spins riveting yarns." Valdivia praised the record for "the mixture of street smarts and the intellectual and emotional depth shown here", which, he said, was often lacking in Iceberg Slim's followers.

An audiobook adaptation of his autobiography Pimp: The Story of My Life, narrated by Cary Hite, was released by Urban Audiobooks in 2011. Hite went on to voice other works of Iceberg Slim, including Long White Con, Trick Baby, and Airtight Willie and Me.

=== Film adaptations ===
Slim's first novel, Trick Baby, was adapted as an eponymous 1972 movie directed by Larry Yust and produced independently for $600,000, with a cast of unknowns. Universal Pictures acquired the film for $1,000,000 and released it in 1973 to a considerable amount of Iceberg Slim fanfare; the movie grossed $11,000,000 at the US box office. The New York Times praised the film for its depiction of race relations and the friendship between two con men, set "in the grimier reaches of Philadelphia".

In 2006, independent film producers Dave Mortell and David Harb acquired the film rights to produce a film adaptation of Mama Black Widow. In 2008 Mos Def was contacted to play the character of Papa Tilson alongside Rihanna (in what would have been her acting debut in a feature film at the time), Kerry Washington and Macy Gray.

In 2009, television executive producer Rob Weiss, of the HBO show Entourage, and Mitch Davis purchased the film rights to produce a screen adaptation of Pimp.

== Personal life ==
After his release from prison in 1961, Beck met Betty Shue, who became his common-law wife and the mother of his three daughters and one son while he was working as an insecticide salesman. Shue encouraged Beck to write his life story and helped him write drafts.

Beck married Diane Millman Beck in 1982.

== Death ==
According to Beck's widow, Diane Millman Beck, Beck's final years were plagued by financial worries and deteriorating health. Beck suffered from diabetes and became increasingly reclusive. He died from liver failure in April 1992, aged 73. In 2005, Diane Millman Beck and Beck's three daughters from his previous relationship, filed suit against Holloway House for back payment of royalties. They claimed in their suit that Robert Beck died penniless.

== Influence ==
Scottish author Irvine Welsh said: "Iceberg Slim did for the pimp what Jean Genet did for the homosexual and thief and William Burroughs did for the junkie: he articulated the thoughts and feelings of someone who had been there."

=== Academia ===
Welsh adds that a course at Harvard University featured Pimp as a "transgressive novel".

=== Comedy ===
- In his special The Bird Revelation, comedian Dave Chappelle used the life of Iceberg Slim and the world of his book Pimp as a parable for his experience in show business.
- Eddie Murphy's character Velvet Jones, from Saturday Night Live, has been described as a spoof of Iceberg Slim.

=== Films ===
- In 1970, incarcerated Bay Area pimp Robert Poole was influenced by Beck's Pimp while writing a screenplay about his life, The Mack and His Pack. The film was released under the title The Mack (1973), starring Max Julien and Richard Pryor.
- Ice-T produced the documentary Iceberg Slim: Portrait of a Pimp (2012), told through talking-head admirers, including Chris Rock, Snoop Dogg, Ice-T, Henry Rollins, Quincy Jones, and others. The film was directed by Jorge Hinojosa and premiered at the Toronto International Film Festival on September 8, 2012.
- The character of Alamo in Season 3 of Euphoria was inspired by Iceberg Slim.

=== Literature ===
- Author Donald Goines acknowledged the strong influence of Beck's Pimp when he created his urban fiction set in a black milieu. Goines was also published by Bentley Morris of Holloway House.
- Peter A. Muckley published Iceberg Slim: The Life as Art (2003), a critical study of the fiction of Iceberg Slim.

=== Music ===
Slim is an important influence on hip-hop artists. For example:

- Many of the current musical references to pimp culture, for example in the work of Snoop Dogg and Too Short, can be traced back to Iceberg Slim.
- Iceberg Slim's last book, Doom Fox (written in 1978 but not published until 1998), contains an introduction written by Ice-T.
- Spiceberg Slim is a moniker and the eighth studio album (released in 2002) by American rapper Spice 1.
- On Xiu Xiu's album Fabulous Muscles, the title track is subtitled "(Mama Black Widow Version)".
- Australian rock band Doomfoxx adopted their name from the novel Doom Fox.
- Southern hip hop artist Killer Mike mentions having read Robert Beck on a 2024 track Bussin Bricks Intro.

== Bibliography ==
Iceberg Slim's writings include both fiction and nonfiction:

- Pimp: The Story of My Life (1967, Holloway House), memoir
- Trick Baby: The Biography of a Con Man (1967, Holloway House), novel
- Mama Black Widow: A Story of the South's Black Underworld (1969, Holloway House), novel
- The Naked Soul of Iceberg Slim: Robert Beck's Real Story (1971, Holloway House), autobiography
- Long White Con: The Biggest Score of His Life (1977, Holloway House), novel
- Death Wish: A Story of the Mafia (1977, Holloway House), novel
- Airtight Willie & Me (1985, Holloway House), story collection
- Doom Fox (written 1978, published posthumously 1998), novel
- Shetani's Sister (published posthumously 2015), novel
- Night Train to Sugar Hill (Contra Mundum Press, 2019), Slim's final novel

== See also ==
- African-American literature
- Transgressive fiction
