= Caroline Leavitt =

American novelist

Caroline Leavitt is an American novelist.

== Biography ==
Leavitt is the New York Times bestselling author of Is This Tomorrow and Pictures of You, as well as 8 other novels, including Cruel Beautiful World and With or Without You.

Leavitt is the recipient of a New York Foundation for the Arts Fellowship in Fiction, and an honorable mention for the Goldenberg Fiction Prize. In 2025, she was long-listed for the Joyce Carol Oates Literary Fiction Prize.() and She was also a National Magazine Award Nominee in Personal Essay, a finalist in the Nickelodeon Screenwriting Awards, and a finalist in the Sundance Screenwriters Lab. A former book critic for The Boston Globe, The San Francisco Chronicle , she now reviews for People, and she has also published in New York Magazine, Psychology Today, More, Redbook, Parenting, and more. Days of Wonder was one of three novels selected for CBS Club Calvi Book club. Cruel Beautiful World was named one of the Best Books of the Year by BlogCritics and by The Pulpwood Queens. Pictures of You was named one of the Best Books of the year by the San Francisco Chronicle, The Providence Journal, Bookmarks, and one of the top five books by Kirkus Reviews. Is This Tomorrow was named one of the Best Books of the Year by January magazine, and was long-listed for the Maine Prize, as well as being a Jewish Book Council BookClub Pick. She lives in Hoboken, New Jersey with the music journalist and author Jeff Tamarkin and has a grown actor/writer son.

== Select notable works ==
- Days of Wonder
- With or Without You
- Cruel Beautiful World
- Is This Tomorrow
- Pictures of You
- Girls In Trouble
- Coming Back To Me
- Living Other Lives
- Into Thin Air
- Family
- Jealousies
- Lifelines
- Meeting Rozzy Halfway
- The Wrong Sister
