= List of presidents of Fox Entertainment =

The following is a list of presidents of the entertainment division for the Fox Broadcasting Company (Fox).

Name	Years	Notes
Garth Ancier	1986–1989	In 1986, Barry Diller, Jamie Kellner and Rupert Murdoch tapped the then 28-year-old Ancier to be the founding Entertainment President for the new Fox Broadcasting Company, where he put 21 Jump Street, Married... with Children, The Simpsons and In Living Color on the air.
Peter Chernin	1989–1992	From 1989 to 1992, Chernin was president of entertainment for the Fox Broadcasting Company, while programming grew from two to seven nights a week during that span.
Sandy Grushow	1992–1995	In 1992, at the age of 32, Grushow assumed the presidency of the Fox Entertainment Group entire network division, making him the youngest executive to ever hold the title of network president. In that leadership role, Grushow oversaw the development and launch of The X-Files, Melrose Place, Party of Five, Living Single and MADtv while also expanding the network from four to seven nights of primetime programming.
John Matoian	1995–1996	He was a vice-president of the CBS Entertainment division. He later became the president of Entertainment at Fox Broadcasting in September 1995.
Peter Roth	1996–1998	Between 1996 and 1999, he was president of Fox, and then moved over to Warner Bros. Television, where he was president until 2021.
Doug Herzog	1999–2000	He has held senior positions with USA Network, where he helped launch Monk, and at Fox, launching Malcolm in the Middle.
Gail Berman	2000–2005	Network shows under Berman's tenure included American Idol, 24, House, Arrested Development, Bones, and Family Guy.
Peter Liguori	2005–2007	Before joining Discovery in 2009, Liguori served as Chairman of entertainment for Fox, credited with helping the channel FX grow in prominence. Prior to assuming that position in 2005, Liguori was president and CEO of News Corp.’s FX Networks since 1998, overseeing business and programming operations for FX and Fox Movie Channel. Liguori joined Fox/Liberty Networks in 1996 as senior vice president of marketing, for a new joint venture, which now includes Fox Sports Net, FX, Fox Sports World, SPEED and National Geographic Channel. Before joining Fox, Liguori was vice president, consumer marketing, at HBO.
Kevin Reilly	2007–2014	Less than two months after leaving NBC, Reilly was hired as president of entertainment at Fox. He also oversaw the development of the shows Gotham, The Last Man on Earth, and Empire, and launched the series Glee, Brooklyn Nine-Nine and New Girl. In 2008-2009, Reilly developed and launched the J.J. Abrams thriller Fringe and Seth MacFarlane's The Cleveland Show. He launched Glee, which won the Golden Globe for Best Series – Musical or Comedy in 2010. He is generally credited with creating Jane Lynch’s character, Sue Sylvester, on the show. In 2011, Reilly also championed New Girl, the network’s highest-rated fall sitcom debut in 10 years. Reilly was named chairman of entertainment for Fox in August 2012. He later introduced the shows Sleepy Hollow, Brooklyn Nine-Nine, The Following, and The Mindy Project. During his time at the network from 2007-2014, the network had a seven-year run as televisions top-rated network for adults aged 18–49. Reilly also bolstered Fox’s leadership and investment in digital and social media. He is credited as 'the architect' behind the Animation Domination High-Def, an independent digital animation subsidiary generating alternative animation for digital channels and a late-night block on Fox. Reilly also initiated a "no pilot season" strategy (designed to nurture fewer new Fox shows with more investment). He left Fox in May 2014.
David Madden	2014–2017	Madden became president of Fox Television Studios in 2010 and signed a new contract in April 2014. He helped develop shows like The Shield and The Americans. In August 2014, he became president of Fox Entertainment Group. In August 2017, Madden left Fox and was succeeded by Michael Thorn, moving on in the following month to be head of original programming for AMC Networks' AMC, Sundance TV and AMC Studios.
Michael Thorn	2017–present	
