= Fox Broadcasting Company =

American commercial broadcast television network

Fox Broadcasting Company, LLC
- Type: Television network
- Country: United States
- Broadcast area: United States, reaching bordering regions via overspill of the American terrestrial network
- Affiliates: List
- Headquarters: 1211 Avenue of the Americas; New York City, New York, 10036; U.S.

Programming
- Language: English
- Picture format: 720p HDTV; 1080p via ATSC 3.0 in some markets

Ownership
- Owner: News Corporation (1986–2013); 21st Century Fox (2013–2019); Fox Corporation (2019–present)
- Parent: Fox Entertainment
- Key people: Rob Wade (President and CEO, Fox Entertainment); Michael Thorn (President, Fox Broadcasting Company Entertainment)
- Sister channels: Fox News; Fox Business; Fox Weather; Fox Local; LiveNow from Fox; Fox Soul; MyNetworkTV

History
- Founded: May 22, 1986; 40 years ago
- Launched: October 9, 1986
- Founder: Rupert Murdoch; Barry Diller
- Former names: FBC (1986–1987)

Links
- Website: fox.com

Availability

Streaming media
- Affiliated Streaming Service(s): Fox One; Tubi; Hulu
- DirecTV Stream: Channel 398 (Fox HD East) Channel 399 (Fox HD West)
- Service(s): DirecTV Stream, Fox One, FuboTV, Hulu + Live TV, Sling TV (owned-and-operated stations only), YouTube TV

Fox Broadcasting Company, LLC (stylized in all caps as FOX) is an American commercial broadcast television network serving as the flagship namesake property of Fox Corporation and operated through Fox Entertainment. The channel was launched by News Corporation on October 9, 1986, as a competitor to the Big Three television networks, ABC, CBS and NBC.

Fox has gone on to become the most successful attempt at a fourth television network; it was also the highest-rated free-to-air network in the 18–49 demographic from 2004 to 2012 and 2020 to 2021 and was the most-watched American television network in total viewership during the 2007–08 season. It is a member of the North American Broadcasters Association and the National Association of Broadcasters. Unlike other major commercial broadcast networks, Fox does not have a newscast of its own due to its lack of a news division, and instead relies on its own 24-hour news channels, Fox News, Fox Business Network and Fox Weather to supply news programming for the network.

Fox and its affiliated companies operate many entertainment channels in international markets, but these do not necessarily air the same programming as the American network. Most viewers in Canada have access to at least one American-based Fox affiliate, either over the air or through a pay television provider, although Fox's National Football League broadcasts and most of its prime time programming are subject to simultaneous substitution regulations for pay television providers imposed by the Canadian Radio-television and Telecommunications Commission (CRTC) to protect rights held by domestically based networks.

Fox is based at Fox Corporation's corporate headquarters at 1211 Avenue of the Americas in Midtown Manhattan, New York City, and it hosts additional offices at the Fox Network Center in Los Angeles and at the Fox Media Center in Tempe, Arizona.

== History ==
=== Origins ===
20th Century Fox (now 20th Century Studios) had been involved in television production as early as 1948. Its television arm was called TCF Television Productions up until 1958, which produced several syndicated programs. Following the closure of the DuMont Television Network in August 1956, after it became mired in severe financial problems, the NTA Film Network was launched as a new "fourth network". 20th would also produce original content for the NTA network. The film network effort would fail after a few years, but 20th continued to dabble in television through its production arm, such as Perry Mason, Batman and M*A*S*H for the Big Three television networks ABC, NBC, and CBS.

=== 1980s: Establishment of the network ===
==== Foundations ====
While running Paramount Pictures, Barry Diller attempted to create a fourth television network. The Paramount Television Service of 1977 was canceled before its first broadcast. Paramount produced many programs for the Big Three but catering to their demands "just wore us down", he said in 1983: "I want to make our own things and put them on the air". Diller hoped to create a "mini-network" of independent television stations airing Paramount programs. Unable to achieve his goal at Paramount, Diller joined film studio 20th Century Fox.

In March 1985, News Corporation, a media company owned by Australian publishing magnate Rupert Murdoch that had mainly served as a newspaper publisher, paid $255 million for a 50% interest in TCF Holdings, the parent company of the 20th Century Fox film studio. In May 1985, News agreed to pay $2.55 billion to acquire independent stations in six major U.S. cities from the John Kluge-run broadcasting company Metromedia: WNEW-TV in New York City, WTTG in Washington, D.C., KTTV in Los Angeles, KRIV-TV in Houston, WFLD-TV in Chicago, and KRLD-TV in Dallas. A seventh station, ABC affiliate WCVB-TV in Boston, was part of the original transaction but was spun off to the Hearst Broadcasting subsidiary of the Hearst Communications in a separate, concurrent deal as part of a right of first refusal related to that station's 1982 sale to Metromedia. (Two years later, News Corporation acquired WXNE-TV in that market from the Christian Broadcasting Network and changed its call letters to WFXT.)

Radio personality Clarke Ingram suggested that the Fox network is a revival or at least a linear descendant of DuMont, since Metromedia was founded when DuMont spun off its two remaining owned-and-operated stations, WNEW-TV (formerly WABD) and WTTG, as DuMont Broadcasting (it later changed its name to Metropolitan Broadcasting before becoming Metromedia). Additionally, the former base of DuMont's operations, the DuMont Tele-Centre in Manhattan, eventually became the present-day Fox Television Center. Also, it is believed that Fox could be a "spiritual successor" to the proposed, but ultimately never-launched, Paramount Television Service, since both were the brainchild of Diller.

==== Beginning of the network ====
Logo used from 1987 to 1993

In 1985, 20th Century Fox announced its intentions to form a fourth television network that would compete with the "big three" of ABC, CBS, and NBC. The plans were to use the combination of the Fox studios and the former Metromedia stations to both produce and distribute programming. Organizational plans for the network were held off until the Metromedia acquisitions cleared regulatory hurdles. Then, in December 1985, Rupert Murdoch agreed to pay $325 million to acquire the remaining equity in TCF Holdings from his original partner, Marvin Davis. The purchase of the Metromedia stations was approved by the Federal Communications Commission (FCC) in March 1986; the call letters of the New York City and Dallas outlets were subsequently changed respectively to WNYW and KDAF. These first six stations, then broadcasting to a combined reach of 22% of the nation's households, became known as the Fox Television Stations group. With the sole exception of KDAF (which was sold to Renaissance Broadcasting in 1995, at which time it became an affiliate of The WB), all of the original owned-and-operated stations ("O&Os") are still part of the Fox network today. Like the core O&O group, Fox's affiliate body initially consisted of independent stations (a few of which had maintained affiliations with ABC, NBC, CBS, or DuMont earlier in their existences). The local charter affiliate was, in most cases, that market's top-rated independent; however, Fox opted to affiliate with a second-tier independent station in markets where a more established independent declined the affiliation (such as Denver, Phoenix and St. Louis). Largely because of both these factors, Fox in a situation very similar to what DuMont had experienced four decades before had little choice but to affiliate with UHF stations in all except a few (mainly larger) markets where the network gained clearance. Then-Fox Inc. head Barry Diller was acknowledged to have been the one who created the network, with the New York Times noting in October 1986 that Diller's "current obsession is creating a television network to compete each evening with NBC, CBS and ABC."

According to historical reports, executives with the proposed Fox network were so intent on competing with the "big three" that, for the initial branding, the network was set on copying the naming trend of the "big three" by using the "FBC" initialism (copying "NBC", "CBS, & "ABC") of the network's corporate name. Other proposed names for Fox were "Universal Broadcasting System" (UBS) and "International Broadcasting System" (IBS).

The Fox television network officially debuted with a soft launch at 11:00 p.m. Eastern and Pacific Time on Thursday, October 9, 1986. Its inaugural program was a late-night talk show, The Late Show, which was hosted by comedian Joan Rivers. After a strong start, The Late Show quickly eroded in the ratings; it was never able to overtake NBC stalwart The Tonight Show. By early 1987, Rivers (and her then-husband Edgar Rosenberg, the show's original executive producer) quit The Late Show after disagreements with the network over the show's creative direction, the program then began to be hosted by a succession of guest hosts. After that point, some stations that affiliated with FBC in the weeks before the April 1987 launch of its prime time lineup (such as WCGV-TV in Milwaukee and WDRB-TV in Louisville) signed affiliation agreements with the network on the condition that they would not have to carry The Late Show due to the program's weak ratings.

Shortly before the official launch of FBC on April 5, 1987, under original Fox Entertainment President Garth Ancier, the network underwent a re-branding to the much shorter "Fox". According to an interview Ancier gave at that time, it was ad man Jay Chiat who suggested to network executives that, rather than create a brand from scratch, the network ought to use the "Fox" heritage of the previous 80 years and the "searchlight" iconography to link Fox Broadcasting to 20th Century Fox. Until late in the game during the 1980s, several station groups like Media Central and Pappas Telecasting had avoided Fox when the network launched, but joined the network later on.

The network had its "grand opening" when it expanded its programming into prime time on April 5, 1987, inaugurating its Sunday night lineup with the premieres of the sitcom Married... with Children and the sketch comedy series The Tracey Ullman Show. The premieres of both series were rebroadcast twice following their initial airings (at 7:00 p.m. and 7:30 pm. Eastern/Pacific, respectively) that night, which Jamie Kellner, who served as the network's president and chief operating officer until his resignation in January 1993, stated would allow viewers to "sample FBC programming without missing 60 Minutes, Murder, She Wrote, or the 8 o'clock movies". Fox added one new show per week over the next several weeks, with the drama 21 Jump Street and comedies Mr. President and Duet completing its Sunday schedule. On July 11, 1987, the network rolled out its Saturday night schedule with the premiere of the supernatural drama series Werewolf, which began with a two-hour pilot movie event. Three other series were added to the Saturday lineup over the next three weeks: comedies The New Adventures of Beans Baxter, Karen's Song, and Down and Out in Beverly Hills (the latter being an adaptation of the film of the same name). Both Karen's Song and Down and Out in Beverly Hills were canceled by the start of the 1987–88 television season, the network's first fall launch, and were replaced by the sitcoms Second Chance and Women in Prison, both of which would be cancelled by mid 1988.

In regard to its late night lineup, Fox had already decided to cancel The Late Show, and had a replacement series in development, The Wilton North Report, when the former series began a ratings resurgence under its final guest host, comedian Arsenio Hall. Wilton North lasted just a few weeks, however, and the network was unable to reach a deal with Hall to return as host when it hurriedly revived The Late Show in early 1988. The Late Show went back to featuring guest hosts, eventually selecting Ross Shafer as its permanent host, only for it to be canceled for good by October 1988, while Hall signed a deal with Paramount Television to develop his own syndicated late night talk show, The Arsenio Hall Show. Fox aired the 39th Primetime Emmy Awards and would air the next five editions.

Although the network had modest successes in Married... with Children and The Tracy Ullman Show, several affiliates were disappointed with Fox's largely underperforming programming lineup during the network's first three years; KMSP-TV in Minneapolis and KPTV in Portland, Oregon, both owned at the time by Chris-Craft Television, disaffiliated from Fox in 1988 (with KITN (now WFTC) and KPDX respectively replacing those stations as Fox affiliates), citing that the network's weaker program offerings were hampering viewership of their stronger syndicated slate.

At the start of the 1989–90 television season, Fox added a third night of programming, on Mondays. The season heralded the start of a turnaround for Fox. It saw the debut of a midseason replacement series, The Simpsons, an animated series that originated as a series of shorts on The Tracey Ullman Show. Ranked at a three-way tie for 29th place in the Nielsen ratings, it became a breakout hit and was the first Fox series to break the Top 30. The Simpsons, at 37 years as of 2026, is the longest-running American sitcom, the longest-running American animated program, and the longest-running American scripted primetime television series.

In 1989, Fox also first introduced the documentary series Cops and crime-focused magazine program America's Most Wanted (the latter of which debuted as a half-hour series as part of the network's mainly comedy-based Sunday lineup for its first season, before expanding to an hour and moving to Fridays for the 1990–91 season). These two series, which would become staples on the network for just over two decades, would eventually be paired to form the nucleus of Fox's Saturday night schedule beginning in the 1994–95 season. Meanwhile, Married... with Children, which differentiated itself from other family sitcoms of the period as it centered on a dysfunctional lower-middle-class family, saw viewer interest substantially increase beginning in its third season after Michigan homemaker Terry Rakolta began a boycott to force Fox to cancel the series after objecting to risqué humor and sexual content featured in a 1989 episode. Married...'s newfound success led it to become the network's longest-running live-action sitcom, airing for 11 seasons.

=== 1990s: Rise into mainstream success and beginnings of rivalry with the Big Three ===
Fox survived where DuMont and other attempts to start a fourth network had failed because it programmed just under the number of hours defined by the FCC to legally be considered a network. This allowed Fox to make revenue in ways forbidden to the established networks (for instance, it did not have to adhere to the Financial Interest and Syndication Rules that were in effect at the time), since during its first years it was considered to be merely a large group of stations. By comparison, DuMont had been saddled by numerous regulatory barriers that hampered its potential to grow, most notably a ban on acquiring additional stations, during an era when the FCC had much tighter ownership limits for television stations (limiting broadcasters to a maximum of five stations nationwide) than it did when Fox launched. In addition, Murdoch was more than willing to open his wallet to get and keep programming and talent. DuMont, in contrast, operated on a shoestring budget and was unable to keep the programs and stars it had.

Most of the other startup networks that launched in later years (such as UPN and The WB) followed Fox's model as well. Furthermore, DuMont operated during a time when the FCC did not require television manufacturers to include UHF capability. To see DuMont's UHF stations, most people had to buy an expensive converter. Even then, the signal quality was marginal at best compared to the signals of VHF stations. By the time Fox launched, cable allowed UHF stations to generally be on an equal footing with VHF stations.

Although Fox was growing rapidly as a network and had established itself as a presence, it was still not considered a major competitor to the established "Big Three" broadcast networks, ABC, CBS, and NBC. From its launch, Fox had the advantage of offering programs intended to appeal toward a younger demographic – adults between 18 and 34 years of age – and that were edgier in content, whereas some programs that were carried by the "Big Three" networks attracted an older-skewing audience. Until the early 1990s, when Fox expanded its programming to additional nights and outside prime time, most Fox stations were still essentially formatted as independent stations – filling their schedules with mainly first-run and acquired programming, and, during prime time, running either syndicated programs or, more commonly, movies on nights when the network did not provide programming. Few Fox stations carried local newscasts during the network's early years, unlike the owned-and-operated stations and affiliates of its established rivals. Those that did were mostly based in larger markets (including some of the network's O&Os) and retained newscasts that had aired for decades. Even then, these news operations were limited to one newscast per day, following the network's prime time lineup.

On September 6, 1990, Fox reached an agreement with TCI (the nation's largest cable company at the time) in which TCI systems in markets that were not served by an over-the-air Fox affiliate at the time would become charter affiliates of a cable-only national feed of the network called Foxnet. The cable-only network launched on June 6, 1991, bringing Fox programming to smaller markets that did not carry a default Fox affiliate at the time; it would manage to reach a total of 1.3 million subscribers by 1992.

As Fox gradually headed towards carrying a full week's worth of programming in prime time through the addition of programming on Thursday and Friday nights at the start of the 1990–91 season, the network's added offerings included the scheduling of The Simpsons opposite veteran NBC sitcom The Cosby Show as part of Fox's initial Thursday night lineup that fall (along with future hit Beverly Hills, 90210, which would become the network's longest-running drama, airing for ten seasons) after only a half-season of success on Sunday nights. The show performed well in its new Thursday slot, spending four seasons there and helping to launch Martin, starring Martin Lawrence and Tisha Campbell was another Fox comedy that became a hit when it debuted in August 1992. The Simpsons returned to Sunday nights in the fall of 1994, and has remained there ever since.

The sketch comedy series In Living Color, (created by Keenen Ivory Wayans), debuted in April 1990, created many memorable characters and launched the careers of future movie stars Jim Carrey, Kim Coles, Tommy Davidson, Jamie Foxx, David Alan Grier, Damon Wayans, Shawn Wayans, Marlon Wayans, guest stars Chris Rock and Tim Meadows, Reggie McFadden and Rosie Perez and Jennifer Lopez, both members of the show's dance troupe, the "Fly Girls". The series also gained international prominence after Fox aired a special live episode in January 1992 as an alternative to the halftime show during Super Bowl XXVI, which was broadcast on CBS, marking the start of Fox's rivalry with the "Big Three" networks while popularizing the counterprogramming strategy against the Super Bowl telecast.

The early and mid-1990s saw the debuts of several soap opera-style prime time dramas aimed at younger audiences that became quick hits, which, in addition to Beverly Hills, 90210, included its adult-focused spin-off Melrose Place (which initially had a mediocre ratings performance, before viewership rose significantly midway through its first season following Heather Locklear's addition to the cast), its own short lived spin-off Models Inc., and family drama Party of Five. The early and mid-1990s also saw the network launch several series aimed at a black audience, which, in addition to Martin, included the succsesful sitcoms Living Single starring Queen Latifah, Kim Fields and Erika Alexander, Roc starring Charles S. Dutton and police procedural New York Undercover.

==== Luring the NFL and affiliation switches ====
Despite having a few successful shows like the science fiction drama The X-Files, Fox still lacked credibility among viewers. Even those working in television thought of Fox as "the one that has that cartoon show" (The Simpsons). More than 85% of affiliates in 1993 were UHF stations. Fox became a viable competitor to the older networks when it won broadcast television rights to the National Football League (NFL) away from CBS. In December 1993, Fox signed a contract with the NFL to televise games from the National Football Conference (NFC)—which had been airing its games on CBS since 1956—starting with the 1994 season. The initial four-year contract, which Fox bid $1.58 billion to obtain—while CBS offered $295 million per year to retain the rights—also included the exclusive U.S. television rights to Super Bowl XXXI in 1997. The network also lured Pat Summerall, John Madden, Dick Stockton, Matt Millen, James Brown, Terry Bradshaw, and behind-the-scenes production personnel, from CBS Sports to staff its NFL coverage.

Shortly afterward, News Corporation began striking affiliation deals with, and later purchasing, more television station groups. On May 23, 1994, Fox agreed to purchase a 20% stake in New World Communications, a television and film production company controlled by investor Ronald Perelman that had just recently entered into broadcasting through its 1993 purchase of seven stations owned by SCI Television. As a result of Fox acquiring a 20% minority interest in the company, New World signed an agreement to switch the affiliations of twelve stations (eight CBS affiliates, three ABC affiliates [ two of which were subsequently placed in a blind trust and then sold directly to Fox due to conflicts with FCC ownership rules ], and one NBC affiliate) that it had either already owned outright or was in the process of acquiring from Citicasters and Argyle Communications at the time to Fox starting in September 1994 and continuing as existing affiliation contracts with their existing major network partners expired.

That summer, SF Broadcasting, a joint venture between Fox and Savoy Pictures that was founded in March 1994, purchased four stations from Burnham Broadcasting (three NBC affiliates and one ABC affiliate); through a separate agreement, those stations would also switch to Fox between September 1995 and January 1996 as existing affiliation agreements lapsed. These two deals were not the first instances in which a longtime "Big Three" station affiliated with Fox: in Miami, the affiliation moved from WCIX (channel 6) to NBC affiliate WSVN in January 1989 as the result of a complicated six-station affiliation swap in two South Florida markets spurred by NBC's purchase of CBS affiliate WTVJ (channel 4) and CBS's purchase of WCIX. WSVN immediately attracted industry notice for featuring a news-intensive tabloid format uncharacteristic of any Fox affiliate or independent station heretofore, with then-Fox network president Lucie Salhany calling WSVN "the future of television" in May 1994. WSVN remains the largest Fox affiliate in terms of market size to have entirely eschewed any prominent on-air branding with the network name.

The NFC contract, in fact, was the impetus for the affiliation deal with New World and SF Broadcasting's purchase of the Burnham stations, as Fox sought to improve local coverage of its new NFL package by aligning the network with stations that had more established histories and advertiser value than its charter affiliates. The deals spurred a series of affiliation realignments between all four U.S. television networks involving individual stations and various broadcasting groups such as those between CBS and Group W (whose corporate parent later bought the network in August 1995), and ABC and the E. W. Scripps Company (which owned three Fox affiliates that switched to either ABC or NBC as a result of the New World deal) affecting 30 television markets between September 1994 and September 1996. The two deals also had the side benefit of increasing local news programming on the new Fox affiliates, mirroring the programming format adopted by WSVN upon that station's switch to the network (as well as expanding the number of news-producing stations in Fox's portfolio beyond mainly charter stations in certain large and mid-sized markets).

With significant market share for the first time ever and the rights to the NFL, Fox firmly established itself as the nation's fourth major network. Fox Television Stations would acquire New World outright on July 17, 1996, in a $2.48 billion stock purchase, making the latter's twelve Fox affiliates owned-and-operated stations of the network; the deal was completed on January 22, 1997. Later, in August 2000, Fox bought several stations owned by Chris-Craft Industries and its subsidiaries BHC Communications and United Television for $5.5 billion (most of these stations were UPN affiliates, although its Minneapolis station KMSP-TV would rejoin Fox in September 2002 as an owned-and-operated station). These purchases, for a time, made Fox Television Stations the largest owner of television stations in the U.S. (a title that has since been assumed by the Sinclair Broadcast Group, one of the network's largest affiliate groups).

==== Evolving programming ====
Fox completed its prime time expansion to all seven nights on January 19, 1993, with the launch of two additional nights of programming on Tuesdays and Wednesdays (The method of gradually adding nights to the programming schedule that began with the network's April 1987 prime time launch was replicated by The WB and UPN when those networks debuted in January 1995), making it the fifth broadcast network (behind the Dumont network) to air programming on a nightly basis. September 1993 saw the heavy promotion and debut of a short-lived western series that incorporated science-fiction elements, The Adventures of Brisco County, Jr. However, it was the supernatural investigative drama that debuted immediately following it on Friday nights, The X-Files, that would find long-lasting success, and would become Fox's first series to crack Nielsen's year-end Top 20 most-watched network programs. After several other failed attempts at late night programming following the cancellation of The Late Show (most notably, the quick failure of The Chevy Chase Show in 1993), Fox finally found success in that time period with the debut of MADtv on October 14, 1995; the sketch comedy series became a solid competitor to NBC's Saturday Night Live for over a decade and was Fox's most successful late night program as well as one of its most successful Saturday night shows, running for 14 seasons until 2009. Fox temporarily returned to late night in 2026 by producing FIFA World Cup on FOX After Hours with James Corden, a comedic daily recap of the 2026 FIFA World Cup with James Corden, the former host of CBS' Late Late Show with James Corden.

An attempt to make a larger effort to program Saturday nights by moving Married... with Children from its longtime Sunday slot and adding a new but short-lived sitcom (Love and Marriage) to the night at the beginning of the 1996–97 season backfired with the public, as it resulted in a brief cancellation of America's Most Wanted that was criticized by law enforcement and public officials, and was roundly rejected by viewers, which brought swift cancellation to the newer series. Married... quickly returned to Sundays (before moving again to Mondays two months later); both it and Martin would end their runs at the end of that season. The Saturday schedule was revised in November 1996, to feature one new and one encore episode of Cops, and the revived America's Most Wanted: America Fights Back. Cops and AMW remained the anchors of Fox's Saturday lineup, making it the most stable night in American broadcast television for over 14 years; both shows eventually were among the few first-run programs remaining on Saturday evenings across the four major networks after decreasing prime time viewership – as more people opted to engage in leisure activities away from home rather than watch television on that night of the week led ABC, NBC and CBS to largely abandon first-run series on Saturdays (outside newsmagazines, sports and burned off prime time shows that failed on other nights) in favor of reruns and movies by the mid-2000s. America's Most Wanted ended its 22-year run on Fox in June 2011, and was subsequently picked up by Lifetime (before being cancelled for good in 2013); Cops, in turn, would move its first-run episodes to Spike in 2013 after 23 seasons (ending its original run on Fox as the network's longest-running prime time program), leaving sports and repeats of reality and drama series as the only programs airing on Fox on Saturday evenings.

During the 1997–98 season, Fox had three shows in the Nielsen Top 20 (in terms of total viewers); The X-Files (which ranked 11th), King of the Hill (which ranked 15th) and The Simpsons (which ranked 18th), all of which aired on Sunday nights. Building around its flagship animated comedy The Simpsons, Fox would experience relative success with animated sitcoms in prime time, beginning with the debut of the Mike Judge-produced King of the Hill in 1997. Family Guy (the first of three adult-oriented animated series from Seth MacFarlane to air on the network) and Futurama (from Simpsons creator Matt Groening) would make their debuts in 1999; however, they were canceled in 2002 and 2003 respectively. Due to strong DVD sales and highly rated cable reruns on Cartoon Network's Adult Swim, Fox later decided to order new episodes of Family Guy, which began airing in 2005. Futurama would be revived with four direct-to-DVD films between 2007 and 2009 and would return as a first-run series on Comedy Central, where it ran from 2010 to 2013. Less successful efforts included The Critic, starring Saturday Night Live alumnus Jon Lovitz (which Fox picked up in 1994 after it was cancelled by ABC, only for the series to be cancelled again after its second season), and The PJs (starring Eddie Murphy and Loretta Devine) (which moved to The WB in 2000, after Fox cancelled that series after its second season). Other notable shows that debuted in the late 1990s included the quirky David E. Kelley-produced live-action dramedy Ally McBeal, the short-lived game show Greed, and the period comedy That '70s Show, the latter of which became Fox's second-longest-running live-action sitcom, airing for eight seasons.

Throughout the 1990s and into the next decade, Fox launched a slate of cable channels beginning with the 1994 debuts of general entertainment network FX and movie channel FXM: Movies from Fox (now FX Movie Channel), followed by the debut of Fox News Channel in August 1996. Its sports operations expanded with the acquisition of controlling interests in several regional sports networks (including the Prime Network and SportsChannel) between 1996 and 2000 to form Fox Sports Net (which launched in November 1996), its 2000 purchase of Speedvision (later Speed Channel, which was replaced in the United States by Fox Sports 1 in August 2013; however, it continues to exist in other North American and Caribbean countries as Fox Sports Racing), and the launches of Fox Sports World (later Fox Soccer, which was replaced by FXX in September 2013) and Fox Sports en Español (now Fox Deportes) in the early 2000s.

=== 2000s: Rise to ratings leadership, the American Idol effect, and fierce rivalry with CBS ===
By 2000, many staple Fox shows of the 1990s had ended their runs. During the late 1990s and carrying over into the early 2000s, Fox put much of its efforts into producing reality shows many of which were considered to be sensationalistic and controversial in nature – such as Who Wants to Marry a Multi-Millionaire?, Temptation Island, Married by America, and Joe Millionaire (which became the first Fox program to crack the Nielsen Top 10), as well as video clip shows such as World's Wildest Police Videos and When Animals Attack!. After shedding most of these programs, Fox gradually filled its lineup with acclaimed dramas such as 24, The O.C., House, Prison Break and Bones, and comedies such as The Bernie Mac Show, Malcolm in the Middle, and Arrested Development.

As the decade wore on, Fox began surpassing ABC and NBC in the ratings, first in age demographics, then in overall viewership, and placed second behind a resurgent CBS in total viewership, beginning in 2002. Fox hit a major milestone in 2005 when it emerged as the most-watched U.S. broadcast network in the lucrative 18–49 demographic for the first time, largely boosted by the strength of the reality singing competition series American Idol. Regarded as the single most dominant program on 21st-century U.S. television, as well as the first Fox show to lead the Nielsen seasonal ratings, American Idol had peak audiences of up to 38 million viewers during the 2003 season finale and double-season average audiences of around 31 million viewers in 2006 and 2007. Subsequently, it leapfrogged over Fox's Big Three competition to become the highest-rated U.S. television program overall starting with the 2003–04 season, becoming the first reality singing competition series in the country to reach first place in the seasonal ratings.

American Idol remains the most recent American television program to date to lead the national prime time ratings and attract at least 30 million viewers for multiple and consecutive television seasons. It is the most-watched program on American television by seasonal average viewership in the 2000s decade, as well as the most recent program scheduled to have successfully established a graveyard slot on American television since the end of NBC's Friends in 2004 and the subsequent decline of NBC's previously dominant "Must See TV" Thursday timeblock. By 2005, reality television succeeded sitcoms as the most popular form of entertainment in the United States as a result of Fox's rise with American Idol and NBC's network declines. House, which aired as American Idol's lead-out program on Tuesday nights, earned international prominence in the 21st century and became Fox's first prime time drama series (and the network's third program overall) to reach the Nielsen Top 10 beginning 2006.

Beginning 2004, CBS and Fox, which ranked as the two most-watched broadcast networks in the U.S. during the 2000s, have tended to equal one another in demographic ratings among general viewership, with both networks winning certain demographics by narrow margins; however, while Fox has the youngest-skewing viewer base, CBS is consistently regarded to have the oldest audience demographics among the major broadcast networks. Fox hit a milestone in February 2005 by scoring its first sweeps victory in total viewership and demographic ratings, boosted largely by its broadcast of Super Bowl XXXIX and the strengths of American Idol, 24, House, and The O.C.

In September 2006, as a result of the increasing number of over-the-air Fox affiliates and the increased availability of digital subchannels carrying Fox in certain markets, Foxnet was discontinued. Then, a sweeping milestone came by the conclusion of the 2007–08 season on May 21, 2008, shortly after the widely acclaimed seventh-season finale of American Idol, when Fox outranked longtime leader CBS as the most-watched television network overall in the United States, attributed to the strengths of Super Bowl XLII and its NFL game coverages, Idol and House during that season. To date, Fox is the only non-Big Three network to top the overall Nielsen ratings since its inception in the 1950–51 season.

In the late 2000s, Fox launched a few series that proved to be powerful hits in different respects. In 2007, the network began production on the game shows Are You Smarter than a 5th Grader? and Don't Forget the Lyrics!; both shows ran for a total of three seasons each, making them the longest-running game shows in Fox's history. In 2008, the supernatural mystery series Fringe debuted to moderate ratings but earned critical acclaim during its first season on Tuesdays. Throughout its run, the series developed a large loyal fanbase that turned the show into a cult favorite. In 2009, Glee premiered to average ratings when its pilot aired as a lead-out program of the eighth-season finale of American Idol, but earned positive reviews from critics. The cast of the series has been acknowledged by Barack Obama and Oprah Winfrey, who have each asked the cast to perform live for various national events.

=== 2010–2017: Network's ratings collapse and revamp in network programming ===
At the beginning of the 2010s, new comedies Raising Hope and New Girl gave Fox its first live-action comedy successes in years. The second season of Glee delivered that series' highest ratings during the 2010–11 season, with viewership peaking during its Super Bowl lead-out episode in February 2011 (marking the most expensive post-Super Bowl episode ever produced on U.S. television). The said show has continuously attracted worldwide media attention that it formed a large, loyal international fanbase. At the same time, Fox's live telecast of the Super Bowl XLV helped Fox emerge as the first U.S. television network to earn an average single-night prime time audience of at least 100 million viewers.

American Idol lost its first place standing among all network prime time programs during the 2011–12 finale (falling to second that season behind NBC Sunday Night Football), ending the longest streak at#1 for a prime-time broadcast network series in American television history, through its eight-year ratings domination in both the Adults 18–49 demographic and total viewership. Idol also remained in the Nielsen Top 10 for eleven years from 2003 to 2013, and became the highest-rated non-sports prime time television program as well as the highest-rated reality series in the United States from 2003 to 2012. these records marked the longest Nielsen ratings streaks of any Fox program in these categories.

The 2012 season finale of American Idol marked the end of the season-long 25th anniversary of the establishment of Fox network, helping it win in the 18–49 demographic for the eighth consecutive season, the longest such streak according to Nielsen measurement records (and still standing as of 2026). However, Fox suffered a collapse in viewership during the 2012–13 season; American Idol and Glee suffered steep ratings declines, while the network as a whole fell to third place (suffering an overall decrease by 22%) in total viewership and to second place in the 18–49 demographic (where it remained as of 2014) by the end of the season.

The decline in ratings continued into the 2013–14 season, with Fox placing fourth among the major networks in total viewership for the first time since 2001. Subsequently, on January 13, 2014, Fox announced that it would abandon its use of the standard concept of greenlighting shows through the initial order of pilot episodes during the designated "pilot season" (running from January through April), instead opting to pick up shows directly to series.

Fox scored renewed ratings successes with its February 2014 live telecast of Super Bowl XLVIII, which became the second most-watched television broadcast (by average) in U.S. history, and the lead-out programs that followed this event – New Girl and Brooklyn Nine-Nine. Later, in May 2014, Kevin Reilly announced that he would resign as chairman of Fox Entertainment. On July 15, 2014, then-corporate parent 21st Century Fox announced that it would merge the operations of the network and 20th Century Fox Television into the newly created Fox Television Group, with 20th Century Fox Television co-chairpersons Dana Walden and Gary Newman appointed to head the division.

The 2014–15 season saw the series finale of Glee and debut of hits in the freshmen dramas Gotham (based on the Batman mythos) and the Lee Daniels-produced Empire. Ratings for Empire, in particular, increased week-to-week throughout its first season, becoming the network's first successful American Idol lead-out since House, as well as the first American television program to consistently increase its episode-to-episode viewership during its first five weeks since the 1992 feat set by ABC's Roseanne. Empire ended its inaugural season as the first American television show ever to increase its episodic viewership on a consistent basis throughout the course of a single season, as well as Fox's fourth program overall (and the first since the 2013 finale of American Idol) to enter the Nielsen Top 10 by the end of the 2014–15 season.

The 2015–16 season marked a notable turnaround for Fox, as it jumped ahead of ABC to third place in nationwide ratings (both in overall viewership and in the 18–49 demo) and posted several firsts for the network and on American television. Its improvement was boosted by the transfer of the Miss Universe and Miss USA pageants from NBC, as well as shows such as Grease: Live, Empire and the return of The X-Files after its most recent season ending in 2002. Grease: Live became the first live American television musical special of the 21st century to be broadcast in front of a live studio audience (as well as the first ever live musical special aired by a non-Big Three network on primetime).

By 2016, Empire and The X-Files ranked in the Nielsen Top 10 for the season, the first season with 2 Fox programs entering the top rankings since the American Idol-House tandem of the 2007–2008 season (and the first ever season that Fox achieved such rankings without American Idol or any other reality television show from Fox in the Top 10). The same year also marked the finale of American Idol in its original run on Fox after airing for fifteen seasons, ending an era of one of the most successful shows in American television history.

In February 2017, Fox broadcast Super Bowl LI, which attracted an average 111.3 million viewers—ranking among the top five most-watched Super Bowl games, and the second-highest audience in network history behind Super Bowl XLVIII.

In March 2017, Rob Wade was named Fox's new president of alternative entertainment and specials Rob Wade; he had previously worked as a showrunner for Dancing with the Stars, as head of entertainment for BBC Worldwide, and as executive producer of America's Got Talent and The X Factor.

=== 2018–present: Sale of studios to Disney, focus on non-scripted and sports programming ===
On July 27, 2018, in a deal first announced December 2017, and completed March 20, 2019, 21st Century Fox shareholders agreed to sell most of its key assets (including 20th Century Fox and FX Networks) to The Walt Disney Company for $71.3 billion, following the spin-off of certain businesses. The sale did not include the Fox Broadcasting Company and television stations or the Fox Sports, Fox News, and Fox Business cable channels, which were to be maintained under a company tentatively referred to as "New Fox". Because Disney already owns the American Broadcasting Company (ABC), the acquisition of the Fox network by Disney would have been illegal under the Federal Communications Commission (FCC)'s rules prohibiting a merger between any of the four major broadcast networks. As a result of the Disney/Fox deal, and with the merger of CBS and Viacom on December 4, 2019, Fox has become the only major American broadcast network without attachment to any film studio.

It was acknowledged that Fox had placed a larger emphasis on its sports programming in its first upfronts since the deal was announced, including the acquisitions of the NFL's Thursday Night Football package and rights to the FIFA World Cup. It was also noted that Fox had been increasingly pivoting towards programs that could generate large audiences, as opposed to ones that become successful primarily through critical acclaim. On June 27, 2018, WWE announced that SmackDown would move to Fox on Friday nights beginning October 4, 2019, following its run on USA Network, under a five-year contract valued at $205 million per-year. The network also began to increase its non-scripted output, announcing the new celebrity music competition series The Masked Singer (based on the South Korean format King of Mask Singer), and the new game shows Mental Samurai and Spin the Wheel for the 2018–19 season.

In August 2018, Fox Television Group CEO Dana Walden stated that the network planned to commission and acquire more series from "independent" studios not co-owned with the Big Three networks, explaining that the vertical integration of the major broadcast networks (including Fox itself) with associated studios had limited opportunities for outside studios, and cited several top programs that were distributed by third-parties, such as The Big Bang Theory and This Is Us (produced by Warner Bros. Television and 20th Television for CBS and NBC respectively). There were also plans for Fox to acquire new pitches directly from their writers, and offer them to outside producers. As part of the transition, Fox aimed to gradually reduce the amount of scripted programming development coming from 20th Television, although stalwarts such as The Simpsons would remain with the network.

Following the completion of the sale, network head Dana Walden became chairwoman of Disney Television Studios and ABC Entertainment. AMC president Charlie Collier succeeded Gary Newman as chairman and CEO of Fox on November 1, 2018. Newman was expected to temporarily remain with Fox in a transitional role, to oversee the corporate transition. The start of 2019 saw The Masked Singer premiere to Fox's highest ratings for a non-scripted premiere without an NFL lead-in since 2011, and record the largest-ever Nielsen ratings gain for a non-scripted series after three days of delayed viewership. On January 30, 2019, Fox ordered a second season, while the first-season finale saw an average audience of 11.5 million viewers.

With the completion of Disney's purchase the next day, the "New Fox" entity, officially named Fox Corporation, formally began trading on March 19, 2019. At its 2019–20 upfronts, Fox announced 10 new scripted series for the upcoming season, with three (Almost Family, Bless the Harts, and Prodigal Son) slated for the fall lineup, as well as the second and third seasons of The Masked Singer — scheduled for October 2019 and February 2020 respectively (with the latter premiering after Super Bowl LIV). Fox also established a new in-house studio, Fox Alternative Entertainment, for investments in non-scripted formats. It is led by Rob Wade, while its first production was the second season of The Masked Singer (after season 1 was produced by Endemol Shine North America).

Thursday Night Football finished as the second highest-rated series of the 2018–19 television season in the key demographic, behind only Sunday Night Football, while The Masked Singer finished tied for third with The Big Bang Theory and This Is Us. In the 2019–20, Thursday Night Football and The Masked Singer once again finished as the second and third highest-rated programs in the key demographic, and Fox finished the season as the highest-rated network among viewers 18–49 (with CBS leading in overall viewers). Fox repeated this victory in the 2020–21 season, but was narrowly beaten by NBC for 2021–22 by a tenth of a ratings share. In October 2022, Collier stepped down to join Roku, with Rob Wade promoted to president and CEO of Fox Entertainment. That season, Fox would lose Thursday Night Football to Amazon Prime Video.

In May 2023, Fox dropped its procedural drama 9-1-1 after six seasons. It had been the network's scripted tentpole since 2018. As a 20th Television production, ABC would subsequently pick up the series for a seventh season. Its spin-off 9-1-1: Lone Star would remain on Fox for the time being, with a renewal for a fifth season. In September 2024, it was announced that 9-1-1: Lone Star would conclude after its fifth season; it was the last 20th Television-produced drama airing on the network. Fox would also lose SmackDown to USA Network in September 2024; as a replacement, Fox would begin a strategy of regular sports programming on Friday nights, beginning with a package of primetime college football games. The new package would leverage Fox's contract extension with the Big Ten Conference, which included options for the network to carry Friday-night games after the addition of west coast teams to the conference.

== Programming ==
As of 2015, Fox currently provides 17 hours of regularly scheduled network programming each week. The network provides fifteen hours of prime time programming to its owned-and-operated and affiliated stations on Monday through Saturdays from 8:00 to 10:00 p.m. and Sundays from 7:00 p.m. to 10:00 p.m. (all times Eastern and Pacific). An hour of late night programming is also offered on Saturdays from 11:00 p.m. to 12:00 am. Eastern and Pacific Time, a former hour of original comedy, but currently a repeat hour for primetime series (though scheduling for that hour varies depending on the market due to late local newscasts airing in the traditional 11:00 p.m./10:00 p.m. timeslot on some Fox stations), and the hour-long Sunday morning political discussion show – and the network's only regular national news program – Fox News Sunday with Shannon Bream (airing from 9:00 a.m. to 10:00 am. Eastern and Pacific, although the timeslot also varies by market due to local news or public affairs programming).

Sports programming is also provided; usually on weekends, with notable exceptions (albeit not every weekend year-round), and most commonly airing between 11:00 a.m. and 11:30 pm. ET (often airing for longer hours during football season in the fall, slightly less during NASCAR and college basketball season in the winter and barely any in the spring and summer afternoons), The Saturday prime time block (along with the Friday prime time block beginning in 2024) is mainly scheduled for sports programming, with encores of shows airing when no sports programming is airing on a given week.

=== Adult animation ===
Except for The Critic, The PJs and Futurama, which were respectively cancelled in 1995, 2000 and 2003, typically every Sunday night during prime time (unless preempted, usually by sports telecasts), Fox airs a lineup incorporating original adult animation sitcoms, all being produced (or co-produced with Fox for post-2019 works) by the network's original sister company, 20th Television. This block of adult cartoons became a staple of the network airing under the brand Animation Domination from May 1, 2005, to September 14, 2014, when the network rebranded the block as Sunday Funday as a result of the re-incorporation of live-action comedy series on the Sunday night lineup after ten years (aside from occasional burn-offs of series aired on other nights during the 7:00 pm. Eastern/Pacific hour), although animated series remain an integral part of that night's schedule.

The first programs to air as part of the Animation Domination lineup were American Dad! (which also had its beginnings in the lineup, and moved to TBS in October 2014, until its eventual return to the network in early-2026), Family Guy (which returned to the network after a three-year cancellation when Animation Domination began), The Simpsons (the longest-running cartoon on Fox, predating the lineup by 16 years), and King of the Hill (which also predated the lineup by eight years). Once King of the Hill was cancelled, Family Guy's spinoff The Cleveland Show would air from 2009 to 2013 and Loren Bouchard's next series, Bob's Burgers would air starting in 2011. Animated shows currently airing as part of the lineup include The Simpsons, Family Guy, Bob's Burgers, Krapopolis, Grimsburg, and Universal Basic Guys, with American Dad! to return to the network in early-2026 after over a full decade of airing original episodes on TBS. Other shows in the lineup include Sit Down, Shut Up, Allen Gregory, Napoleon Dynamite, Bordertown, Bless the Harts, Duncanville, The Great North, Housebroken, and the live-action/animated hybrid Son of Zorn.

An extension of the Sunday prime-time block called "Animation Domination High-Def" launched on Saturday late nights in July 2013 (marking the return of first-run programming in that time period since the 2010 cancellation of The Wanda Sykes Show), with ADHD Shorts, Axe Cop and High School USA!. Due to low ratings, Fox announced on April 17, 2014, that it would discontinue "Animation Domination High-Def"; although the block was slated to end on June 28, 2014, it continued to air in encore form until the start of the 2016–17 season, when the hour returned to airing encores of comedies or reality series.

=== Children's programming ===
Fox began airing children's programming on September 8, 1990, with the debut of the Fox Children's Network (rebranded as the Fox Kids Network in 1991, and then to simply Fox Kids in 1998), a programming block that aired on Saturday mornings and weekday afternoons. Programming within the Fox Kids block consisted mainly of animated series, although it also featured some live-action series as part of the lineup. Shows featured in the block included Bobby's World, Eek! The Cat, X-Men, Spider-Man, The Tick, Fun House, Goosebumps, Casper, Dragon Ball Z (the Ocean English dub) and Digimon; it also aired select shows from Warner Bros. Animation including the popular animated series Tiny Toon Adventures, Animaniacs and Batman: The Animated Series (Warner Bros. pulled Batman and Animaniacs from the Fox Kids lineup in September 1995, moving both shows, as well as Tiny Toons – which had already ended its run – to the newly launched Kids' WB block on The WB). Fox Kids' most successful series, however, was Mighty Morphin Power Rangers (from eventual sister company and Fox Kids co-parent Saban Entertainment), which debuted in 1993 and became the block's flagship program until it moved to ABC and Toon Disney in 2002.

In October 2001, Fox sold its children's division, Saban Entertainment and Fox Family Worldwide (the parent subsidiary of cable network Fox Family Channel, now Freeform) to The Walt Disney Company for $5.3 billion. The network relegated the Fox Kids block to Saturdays in January 2002 (turning over the two-hour timeslot held by the weekday block to its owned-and-operated and affiliated stations, rather than retaining the slots and filling them with adult-oriented daytime shows); then on September 14, 2002, as part of a time-lease agreement with 4Kids Entertainment to program the remaining four-hour Saturday morning lineup, Fox Kids was replaced by a new children's program block called FoxBox (which was renamed 4Kids TV in January 2005). Notable programs in that block include Yu-Gi-Oh!, Kirby: Right Back at Ya!, Sonic X, Teenage Mutant Ninja Turtles (2003), Shaman King and One Piece.

Fox discontinued the 4Kids TV block on December 27, 2008, due to conflicts between the network and 4Kids Entertainment that were later settled, regarding 4Kids' failure to pay Fox for the programming lease rights, and the network's inability to fulfill a promise guaranteeing clearance on 90% of its stations and to get other stations to carry the block in certain markets where a Fox station declined it (an issue that plagued Fox's children's program blocks since the start of its affiliation deal with New World Communications). Fox had earlier announced, on November 23, that it would no longer carry children's programming in the time period, citing stiff competition from cable channels aimed at the demographic; the network instead turned over two of the four vacant Saturday morning hours to its affiliates to allow them to air local newscasts or educational programs purchased from the syndication market, while it retained the remaining two hours to run a network-managed paid programming block, Weekend Marketplace, which debuted on January 3, 2009.

On September 13, 2014, Xploration Station, a two-hour syndicated block produced by Steve Rotfeld Productions, began airing on Fox stations owned by several affiliate groups including Fox Television Stations and Tribune Broadcasting. The block, which complies with guidelines defined by the Children's Television Act, features programs focused on the STEM fields. Stations can choose to either carry Xploration Station, continue to air Weekend Marketplace (as the Sinclair Broadcast Group chose to do, since it already carries syndicated E/I programming purchased by the company across its Fox affiliates, although Sinclair added the block on most of its Fox affiliates in September 2016) or in case of Birmingham, not at all (since Gray Television carried E/I programs through existing contracts with syndicators of educational program content instead).

=== News ===
Unlike ABC, CBS, and NBC, Fox does not currently air national news programs (morning, evening or overnight, like ABC News, CBS News, and NBC News) or newsmagazines choosing to focus solely on its prime time schedule, sports and other ancillary network programming. The absence of a national news program on the Fox network is despite the fact that Fox Corporation owns the Fox News Channel, which launched in October 1996 and currently maintains near-universal distribution within the United States via pay television providers. Fox News is not structured as a news division of the Fox network, and operates as a technically separate entity within Fox Corporation through the company's Fox News Media subsidiary. However, it does produce some content that is carried by the broadcast network, which is usually separate from the news coverage aired by the cable channel; in particular, FNC anchor Bill Hemmer anchors most prime time news presentations on the Fox network, especially during political news events (which are anchored by Bret Baier on Fox News Channel).

Specifically, the Fox network airs coverage of the State of the Union address, presidential debates, national election coverage, as well as live breaking news coverage currently branded as a "Fox News Special Report" (also branded as a "Fox News Alert" or sometimes a "Fox News Red Alert"); carriage of such special coverage of a breaking news story may vary from station to station, and is often limited to events that occur during the network's usual prime time block (for example, unlike the Big Three, Fox does not often provide coverage of major political convention speeches, which usually occur during the 10:00 p.m. (Eastern Time) hour during which most of its affiliates air local newscasts; however, the majority of Fox's owned-and-operated stations and affiliate groups do carry weekday breaking news briefs). The political discussion show Fox News Sunday also airs on the Fox network on Sunday mornings and is rebroadcast later in the day on FNC. Fox also operates an affiliate news service called Fox NewsEdge, which launched with Fox News Channel in 1996, and provides national and international news reports, and feature stories for Fox stations to use in their own local newscasts.

Since February 23, 2026, Fox News Media produces the 90-second daily news bulletin called Fox News Report anchored by Fox News correspondent Bill Melugin; the bulletin is currently airing on most Fox-owned stations as well as affiliate stations.

Fox first tried its hand at a national news program in prime time with the hour-long weekly newsmagazine The Reporters, which was produced by the same team behind the Fox Television Stations-distributed syndicated tabloid program A Current Affair; the program ran from 1988 to 1990, when it was cancelled due to low ratings. From 1987 until about 1996, Fox also aired news capsules that aired within its prime time schedule, branded first as Fox News Extra, and later as Fox News Updates, which were produced at New York City O&O WNYW and used their anchors. Another failed attempt occurred in 1993, when Fox launched Front Page (which included among its five hosts, Ron Reagan and Josh Mankiewicz), in an attempt to capture a younger demographic for a newsmagazine program.

The network tried its hand at a newsmagazine again in 1998 with Fox Files, hosted by Fox News Channel anchors Catherine Crier and Jon Scott, as well as a team of correspondents; it lasted a little over a year before being cancelled. Its last attempt at a newsmagazine series occurred during the 2002–03 Sweeps period, with The Pulse, hosted by Fox News Channel anchor Shepard Smith. On May 17, 2016, the network aired an interview special with then Fox News primetime anchor Megyn Kelly, Megyn Kelly Presents.

Fox also attempted national morning programs, only the first of which aired on the network itself. Its first venture at such a program was Fox After Breakfast, an hour-long morning news and lifestyle show, hosted by Tom Bergeron, Laurie Hibberd, and Vicki Lawrence, that ran on the network from 1996 to 1998 (Fox aired the program at 9:00 a.m. – as opposed to the 7:00 a.m. to 9:00 a.m. time slot that NBC, CBS, and ABC air their national morning shows – to accommodate local morning newscasts that ran in the latter slot on some of its stations); the program originated as Breakfast Time in 1994 on sister cable channel FX. Fox tried again in 2002 with Good Day Live, a heavily entertainment-focused syndicated offshoot of Good Day L.A., a news/entertainment/lifestyle program that debuted in 1993 on Los Angeles owned-and-operated station KTTV; the national version of the program was cancelled in 2005. On January 22, 2007, Fox premiered The Morning Show with Mike and Juliet on its owned-and-operated stations; hosted by Mike Jerrick and Juliet Huddy (then-anchors of Fox News Channel's DaySide), the show was lighter in format and more entertainment-oriented, though its focus often changed when a major news story occurred. In February 2007, the program was syndicated to other stations including many affiliated with ABC, NBC and CBS in markets where it was not carried by a Fox or MyNetworkTV affiliate; The Morning Show was cancelled in June 2009.

=== Sports ===
When the network launched, Fox management, having seen the critical role that sports programming, soccer events, in particular had played in the growth of the British satellite service BSkyB, believed that sports – and specifically, professional football would be the engine that would make Fox a major network the quickest. In 1987, after ABC initially hedged on renewing its contract to broadcast Monday Night Football, Fox made an offer to the National Football League (NFL) to acquire the rights for the same amount that ABC had been paying, about $13 million per game at the time. However, partly due to the fact that Fox had not yet established itself as a major network, the NFL chose to renew its contract with ABC (where Monday Night Football remained until its move to sister cable channel ESPN in September 2006).

Six years later, when the league entered contract negotiations with its television partners, Fox placed a $1.58 billion bid to obtain broadcast rights to the National Football Conference – covering four seasons of games, beginning with the 1994 NFL season. The NFL selected the Fox bid on December 18, 1993, stripping CBS of football telecasts for the first time since 1955. The event placed Fox on par with the "Big Three" television networks and ushered in an era of growth for the NFL. Fox's acquisition of the NFL rights also quickly led toward the network reaching an affiliation deal with New World Communications to change the affiliations of twelve of its stations to Fox (see above). The rights gave Fox many new viewers and a platform for advertising its other programs.

With a sports division now established with the arrival of the NFL, Fox acquired broadcast television rights to the National Hockey League (1994–99), Major League Baseball (since 1996) and NASCAR auto racing (since 2001, initially as part of a deal that also involved NBC and TNT).

From 2007 to 2010, Fox aired the Bowl Championship Series—a group of college football bowl games held around New Year's Day, and the BCS National Championship Game (with the exception of any event held at the Rose Bowl Stadium, including the Rose Bowl Game and the Rose Bowl-hosted 2010 BCS National Championship Game, as their organizer maintained a separate contract with ABC). Following the conclusion of the deal, Fox acquired rights to the Big Ten Conference and Pac-12 Conference's newly established football championship games (the latter alternating yearly with ESPN). In 2017, Fox acquired tier 1 rights to the Big Ten Conference.

In August 2011, Fox and mixed martial arts promotion Ultimate Fighting Championship (UFC) reached a multi-year agreement, which included the rights to broadcast four live events in prime time or late night annually, marking the first time that the UFC aired its events on broadcast television. Its first UFC on Fox event, Velasquez vs. Dos Santos, aired on November 12, 2011. This deal ended at the end of 2018, with UFC events moving to ESPN and ESPN+.

The network's 2023 telecast of Super Bowl LVII remains the highest-rated U.S. television program on average of all time. Meanwhile, its 2017 telecast of Super Bowl LI remains the record holder for the largest overall audience ever tallied in U.S. television history.

On June 13, 2024, Fox announced a multi-year deal to be the sole broadcaster of the IndyCar Series and its subsidiary series Indy NXT with all IndyCar Series races to be broadcast on the network.

== Stations ==
Fox has 18 owned-and-operated stations, and current and pending affiliation agreements with 226 additional television stations encompassing 50 states, the District of Columbia and three U.S. possessions; through its Fox Television Stations subsidiary, Fox has the most owned-and-operated stations of the major American commercial broadcast networks. The network has a national reach of 95.77% of all households in the United States (or 299,268,292 Americans with at least one television set). Currently, New Hampshire, New Jersey and Delaware are the only U.S. states where Fox does not have a locally licensed affiliate (New Hampshire is served by Boston affiliate WFXT, New Jersey is split between New York City O&O WNYW and Philadelphia O&O WTXF, while Delaware is served by WTXF and Salisbury, Maryland affiliate WBOC-DT2).

Fox largely discontinued analog broadcasts on June 12, 2009, as part of the transition to digital television. As a newer broadcast network, Fox still has a few low-power affiliates, covering markets like Youngstown, Ohio (WYFX-LD). In some markets, including both of the ones mentioned, these stations also maintain simulcasts on a subchannel of a co-owned/managed full-power television station. Fox also maintains a sizeable number of subchannel-only affiliations in cities located outside the 50 largest Nielsen-designated markets that do not have enough full-power stations to support a standalone affiliation or have a low-power station as the only other option as an affiliate, though a couple have appeared in the top 50; the largest subchannel-only Fox affiliate by market size is WSYX-DT3 in Columbus, Ohio, No. 34 by Nielsen.

Nexstar Media Group is Fox's largest affiliate group in terms of overall market and numerical reach, with 42 stations (including some former Fox O&Os that were spun off in 2008 to Local TV, which Tribune Media later acquired in 2013, to finance former Fox parent News Corporation's purchase of The Wall Street Journal; Nexstar purchased Tribune in the fall of 2019); the Sinclair Broadcast Group is the second largest operator of Fox stations by numerical total, owning or providing services to 26 Fox-affiliated stations.

Fox previously distributed its programming in markets that did not have enough stations to support an affiliate via Foxnet, a cable channel acting as an alternate national feed for small and certain mid-sized U.S. markets (generally those within the bottom 110 Nielsen media markets) that launched in 1991 and operated until its shutdown on September 12, 2006; the channel featured a master schedule of programs acquired from the syndication market and some brokered programming to fill time slots not occupied by Fox network programming. The concept behind Foxnet served as the basis for The WB 100+ Station Group (launched in September 1998 as the cable-only feed of The WB) and The CW Plus (the immediate successor of The WB 100+, which launched in September 2006 as a cable-only/digital multicast feed of The CW), which both allow the customization of localized branding (which Foxnet did not allow its cable partners to do) in addition to allowing affiliates to sell local advertising.

For a period in the late 1980s, Fox had an affiliate in Canada, CHCH-TV in Hamilton, Ontario.

== Differences between Fox and the "Big Three" networks ==
=== Network programming ===
Fox's programming schedule differs from the "Big Three" networks in several significant ways: the network airs its prime time programming for only two hours on Monday through Saturday evenings and three hours on Sundays, compared to the three hours on Monday through Saturdays (from 8:00 to 11:00 p.m.) and four hours on Sunday nights (from 7:00 to 11:00 p.m. Eastern and Pacific Time) programmed by the three longer-established networks, ABC, CBS and NBC. This scheduling is termed as "common prime", referring to the programming of prime time content across all of the conventional broadcast networks during the early- and mid-evening hours, while the 10:00 p.m. (Eastern/Pacific)/9:00 p.m. (Central/Mountain) hour is programmed only by the three older networks.

Fox has traditionally avoided programming the 10:00 p.m. hour, choosing to cede the time period to its local affiliates for them to program, many of which air local newscasts during that hour; however, some exceptions do exist for select special film presentations, which by virtue of their running time (depending on whether the film's original length, combined with commercial breaks that would be included in the television cut, would exceed a traditional two-hour broadcast timeslot) must spill over into the 10:00 p.m. hour, overruns from live sports telecasts scheduled to air during prime time and new primetime entertainment programming after primetime (6:30 pm ET) NFL playoff games. However, the network did regularly schedule programming in the 10:00 p.m. hour on Sunday nights from September 1989 to September 1993 (when that specific time period was turned back over to its affiliates), although it never added programming at that hour on any other night. Fox's original reason for the reduced number of prime time hours was to avoid fulfilling FCC requirements in effect at the time to be considered a network, and to be free of resulting regulations, although these rules have since been relaxed.

Despite being a major network, in addition to not carrying national morning and evening newscasts, Fox also does not air any network daytime programming (such as soap operas, game shows or talk shows). Because of this, the network's owned-and-operated stations and affiliates handle the responsibility of programming daytime hours with syndicated or locally produced programming (then corporate sister 20th Television distributes several syndicated daytime programs carried by many Fox stations, such as Divorce Court and The Wendy Williams Show; Fox Television Stations also test markets certain series from 20th Television and other syndicators such as Warner Bros. Television Distribution that are proposed for national distribution on some of its stations). The network also does not carry network-supplied children's programming on Saturday mornings or late-night programming on Monday through Friday nights. Local affiliates either produce their own programming or run syndicated programs during these time periods. Because of the erratic scheduling of the network's sports programming, many Fox stations choose to run a mix of syndicated programming, infomercials and especially movies to fill weekend afternoon timeslots when a sports event is not scheduled to air.

In addition, from the network's inception, Fox has produced two versions of its program promotions for distribution to the network's stations: a standard version incorporating airtimes based on their broadcast in the Eastern/Central or Pacific/Mountain time zones, depending on the feed used by the station (as those seen during network commercial breaks), and versions with "clean" end tags to allow stations to include local airtime and station information through graphical insertion and verbal continuity by station promotional announcers during the program logo graphic or prime time menu. This practice—which differs from that long used by ABC, NBC and CBS, which only allow their stations to insert logos within their network promotions—was also later adopted by The WB and UPN (and their successors The CW, and to a lesser extent, MyNetworkTV) for use by their affiliated stations. A third cut of these promos exists for national program advertising carried by cable networks (including Fox's sister cable networks), where the wording "check local listings" is placed in the end tag.

Fox is the only broadcast network that currently carries adult animated comedies. This started with The Simpsons in 1989. This is followed up by King of the Hill in 1997 (until 2009, with the last remaining four episodes airing on syndication, but is set to return to Hulu for new episodes in 2025), Family Guy (which was cancelled twice until being picked up by Adult Swim for reruns and was brought back by the network in 2005 thanks to home video sales) and Futurama in 1999 (until 2003 when it was also picked up by Adult Swim only to be purchased by Comedy Central for new episodes between 2008 and 2013 and returned for new episodes on Hulu in 2023), American Dad! in 2005 (until 2014 when TBS picked up the series that lasted until March 2025 with the show returning to Fox the following year), The Cleveland Show in 2009 (a Family Guy spinoff that lasted until 2013), Bob's Burgers in 2011, The Great North in 2021 (until 2025), Krapopolis in 2023, Grimsburg and Universal Basic Guys in 2024. Although the network has aired other adult animated shows like The Critic, The PJs, Sit Down, Shut Up, Allen Gregory, Napoleon Dynamite, Bordertown, Son of Zorn (the network's only live-action/animated hybrid sitcom) Bless the Harts, Duncanville, and Housebroken, none had success and were short-lived. While other big-name networks–ABC, CBS, and NBC–have tried to copy the success of Fox with adult animated shows, none were successful.

=== News programming ===
Within Fox's station body, the quantity of locally produced news programming varies considerably compared to the owned-and-operated and affiliated stations of ABC, NBC, and CBS (which typically carry at least 4½ hours of local newscasts on weekdays and one hour on weekends, which are usually spread across morning, midday, early or late evening timeslots). At minimum, most Fox stations run a late-evening newscast following the network's prime time lineup (at 10:00 p.m. in the Eastern and Pacific, and 9:00 p.m. in the Central and Mountain Time Zones), which typically run 30 minutes to one hour in length; besides the fact that the network's stations have more latitude to air an earlier late-evening newscast since Fox does not program that hour, this stems from the fact that several of its charter stations were already airing prime time newscasts as independent stations prior to the network's launch (such as New York City O&O WNYW, which debuted its 10:00 p.m. newscast in March 1967). Most Fox stations also carry a weekday morning newscast of one to three hours in length at 7:00 am, as a local alternative to the national morning news programs provided by the "Big Three" networks (though mainly in the case of Fox stations that have a news operation and in a few cases, via simulcasts with ABC-, NBC- and CBS-affiliated stations that operate a Fox affiliate, this is often part of a morning news block that runs for four to six hours on average).

Fox has fewer stations that have an independent news operation than those of ABC, NBC and CBS; as of October 2015, 70 of Fox's 236 stations (including all 18 owned-and-operated stations) maintain in-house news departments (compared to roughly 5/8–7/8 of the stations of each of the three other major broadcast networks, whose newscasts are either produced in-house or in conjunction with another station). KVVU (channel 5) in Las Vegas has the highest weekly total of news programming hours among Fox's stations, at 78½ hours.

Most Fox stations that run a news operation use a newscast-intensive scheduling format that is very similar to an ABC-, NBC-, or CBS-affiliated station which in many cases, may incorporate midday or early-evening newscasts, the latter of which is often extended by a half-hour to compete with the national evening newscasts provided by the "Big Three" networks; some Fox stations except for those owned by Fox Television Stations and those formerly owned by Tribune Broadcasting air their early-evening newscasts only on Monday through Friday nights, due to frequent sports event overruns into that daypart on weekends. The first Fox station to adopt such a scheduling format was WSVN in Miami; upon affiliating with the network in January 1989, WSVN retained its existing morning, midday and early evening newscasts, while moving its late newscast from 11:00 p.m. to 10:00 p.m. and expanding it to one hour (the station later relaunched an 11:00 p.m. newscast in 1995), and expanding its weekday morning newscast by two hours. This type of format was later adopted by the former major network stations that switched to Fox between 1994 and 1996, especially those affected by New World and Burnham Broadcasting affiliation deals. Many Fox stations with upstart news departments often do not run a full slate of newscasts initially, usually carrying only a prime time newscast at first, before gradually adding other newscasts over time.

In many small to mid-sized markets (largely those ranked outside the 50 largest Nielsen-designated television markets), production of the local Fox affiliate's newscasts is outsourced to an NBC, ABC, or CBS station – either due to insufficient funds or studio space for a news department or in most cases, as a byproduct of the station being operated through a legal duopoly or a management agreement with a major network affiliate (such as with Cunningham Broadcasting-owned WEMT (channel 39) in Greeneville, Tennessee, which has its newscasts produced by NBC affiliate WCYB-TV (channel 5) through a local marketing agreement with Sinclair Broadcast Group). Fox affiliates that outsource their news production to a major-network affiliate often carry a lesser amount of news programming than is possible with an affiliate with a standalone news department due to the contracting station's preference to avoid having the Fox station's newscasts compete against their own in common timeslots (differing from outsourcing agreements between two same-market ABC, CBS, or NBC affiliates in certain areas, in which both stations may simulcast newscasts in the same timeslots). The lone exceptions to this rule currently are El Paso, Texas affiliate KFOX-TV (channel 14) and WXIN, which respectively began producing newscasts for their CBS-affiliated duopoly partners using resources from their existing news departments in September 2014 (when new sister stations KFOX and KDBC-TV (channel 4) consolidated their operations into a single facility) and January 2015 (when WXIN sister WTTV (channel 4) affiliated with CBS), with the Fox stations maintaining the same amount of news programming that they did beforehand. Another exception is KNPN-LD (channel 26) in St. Joseph, Missouri, which has been the smallest Fox affiliate by market size with an in-house news operation since the station's July 2012 sign-on; News-Press & Gazette Company expanded production of KNPN's newscasts to its sister flagship stations, KNPG-LD (channel 21) and KCJO-LD (channel 30), when they respectively joined NBC and CBS in November 2016 and June 2017, though the former also maintained roughly the same amount of news programming before the conversions (KNPN airs morning, midday and early evening newscasts on weekdays and a nightly late evening newscast; all three stations simulcast the first 90 minutes of the morning newscast, while the remainder of KNPN's newscasts air in separate time slots from those seen on KNPG and KCJO).

WPGH-TV (channel 53) in Pittsburgh is the largest Fox station by Nielsen market ranking (at #23) that outsources its news programming; NBC affiliate WPXI (channel 11; owned by Cox Media Group) has produced the station's 10:00 p.m. newscast since 2006, when WPGH shut down its news department following the closure of owner Sinclair Broadcast Group's News Central division. A few Fox affiliates only air syndicated programming in time periods where newscasts would air on other major network stations. The largest Fox station by market size that does not carry news programming is WSYT (channel 68) in Syracuse, New York (which discontinued a 10:00 p.m. newscast produced by CBS affiliate WTVH (channel 5) in 2006). In Dayton, Ohio, Sinclair Broadcast Group took the unusual step in August 2015 of adopting Fox 45 News as its universal brand for its news operation in that market, making it appear as if the news department was operated by WRGT-TV, even though it actually belongs to WRGT's virtual duopoly partner, ABC affiliate WKEF, which Sinclair owns outright (newscasts on WKEF would be branded as "Fox 45 News on ABC22"); Sinclair used WRGT over WKEF due to the latter's perennial "also-ran" reputation in the market in regard to their newscast ratings. WRGT and WKEF have since switched to a new branding model in the summer of 2019 involving a 24/7 web news service called "Dayton 24/7 Now", and in 2021, WRGT's Fox affiliation moved to WKEF's second subchannel (along with a number of other Sinclair or related companies in several other markets), as Sinclair consolidated its network affiliations onto one station in a market to address regulatory concerns.

== Related services ==
=== Video-on-demand services ===
Fox maintains several video on demand venues for viewers to watch the network's programming, including a traditional VOD service called Fox on Demand, which is carried on most traditional cable, satellite, streaming, and telecom providers. Fox also streams most of its programming on the streaming video service Hulu, along with traditional streaming via the network's Full Episode portal on Fox.com. The network's mobile and digital media player app was branded as "Fox Now", and featured access to a live stream of the network's primetime and sports programming (though not local and syndicated programming for affiliates not owned by the network), along with full-time live streams of their owned cable networks with TV Everywhere authentication through authorized television providers.

The most recent episodes of the network's shows are usually made available on the Fox on Demand television service the day after their original broadcast. In addition, fast forwarding capabilities are disabled while viewing content (a commonality for video-on-demand television services provided by the American broadcast networks) and the program's original advertisements that aired during the initial broadcast are included for a week after becoming available on the service, before being replaced by direct response advertising thereafter. Due to restrictions put in place by the network in January 2012 to encourage live or same-week DVR viewing via traditional and cable on demand methods, Hulu and Fox.com both impose an eight-day delay for most viewers to access the most recent episode of any Fox program, restricting day-after-air streaming of its shows on both services to subscribers of certain pay television providers (such as Dish Network and Verizon FiOS) using an ISP account through agreements made with Fox, along with Hulu's free service with advertisements on Yahoo! Stream; however, Hulu offers newer episodes of Fox programs the day after their original broadcast to paid subscribers requiring only a user-determined login.

In March 2020, Fox began to stream the full schedule of all of their owned Fox Television Stations through Fox Now. The following month, Fox acquired the ad-supported streaming service Tubi. The service primarily offers content and channels licensed from third-party studios, but later began to add episodes of Fox Entertainment original series (such as The Masked Singer) a week after their television premiere.

Fox discontinued the Fox Now app in July 2023; streaming of the network's programming would continue on other apps instead, such as Hulu, Fox Local, or Tubi. Fox would effectively relaunch Fox Now as Fox One two years later.

=== Fox HD ===
Fox HD logo used from 2004 to 2013; the final version featured the "HD" characters against the "X".

Fox began broadcasting its programming in 720p high definition on September 12, 2004, with that day's slate of NFC football games during week one of the 2004 NFL season. Until March 14, 2016, the network did not display an on-screen logo graphic on the bottom-right corner of the screen, outside a ten-second sweep of a "Fox HD" promotional logo (which until the end of 2010, also featured a sponsor tag for DirecTV); instead a trigger in Fox's program delivery system at each station displayed the logo bug of an owned-and-operated or affiliate station in the right-hand corner of the 16:9 screen frame, which disappeared during commercial breaks (the station logo bug would still be triggered even if Fox programming was pre-empted locally due to breaking news, severe weather coverage or special programming, though some stations, such as WGGB-DT2 in Springfield, Massachusetts, did not display a logo or substitute only the "FOX" logo alone). However, network or affiliate bugs are not displayed during Fox Sports programming. During some high-profile or live programs such as American Idol and So You Think You Can Dance, however, Fox forwent the affiliate's logo and displayed its network logo instead, mainly for promotional consideration due to fair use of clips from each series by other media outlets (such as news programs, talk shows, and review and satirical programs that rely on clip content); until 2014, the bug was placed in the 4:3 safe area. The Sunday political talk program Fox News Sunday displayed the "Fox HD" logo at all times for both that reason and because of many stations airing the program on tape delay later in the morning. Beginning on March 14, 2016, the standard Fox logo with hashtag is now used on all programming, with the station bug flashed for a few moments at the start of a program or coming out of commercial, as is traditionally done with ABC, CBS and NBC stations. In addition, the Fox HD bug was discontinued; although it was still used on Fox News Sunday until around late 2019-early 2020.

On some Fox programs, a hashtag rests above the affiliate's logo (for example, #newgirl or #bones) to provide viewers reference to the network's official Twitter search tag to find or start discussions during the program being broadcast. In April 2012, additional tags relating to plot points in a given episode (for instance, the #saturdaynightGLEEver tag for an April 2012 episode of Glee of that same title) began to also be promoted in this space to both add additional trending topics and spread out more conversations on Twitter. In cases where the Fox bug appears instead of the station's logo bug, the Twitter hashtag is directly above the Fox logo in the safe area. Fox's coverage of the World Series started broadcasting in HD with Game 1 of the 2002 World Series.

During the transitional period from analog to digital television, Fox was the only commercial television network in the United States to air programs in widescreen that were not available in HD (which were identified as being presented in "Fox High Resolution Widescreen" from 2001 to 2006). Prior to the launch of its HD feed, some sitcoms and drama series were presented in widescreen standard-definition, with reality, talk and game shows (American Idol being the first major exception, as it began to be presented in high definition in 2008) later being presented only in widescreen enhanced definition. The children's sports program This Week in Baseball began airing in widescreen in 2009, while Fox News Sunday converted to HD when Fox News Channel began operating from its new high-definition facilities in November 2008 (prior to Fox News Channel's conversion to a unified widescreen presentation on both its high-definition and standard-definition feeds in September 2010, it was the final Fox News program to structure its graphics and camera positions for the 4:3 safe area). MADtv was produced to air only in 4:3 until September 2008, likely due to a combination of stations tape-delaying the program and therefore being unable to offer it via the live network feed in 16:9, and the show's producers not making the switch to the format. The final Fox show to convert to HD was Family Guy beginning with its September 26, 2010, episode; all programming provided by Fox is now broadcast in widescreen and in high definition as of 2013, and in Dolby Digital 5.1 surround sound.

Fox is unique among American broadcasters as it distributes its HD feed over satellite to the network's affiliates as an MPEG transport stream intended to be delivered bit-for-bit for broadcast transmission. During network programming hours, local commercials are inserted over the feed using a transport stream splicer. Affiliates of most other networks decode compressed satellite network video feeds and then re-encode them for final over-the-air transmission.

After Fox began broadcasting its sports programming with graphics optimized for 16:9 displays rather than the 4:3 safe area in late July 2010, the network asked cable and satellite providers to comply and use the No. 10 Active Format Description flag it now disseminates over Fox programming, which displays content natively broadcast in 16:9 in a letterboxed format suitable for 4:3 television screens to allow any optimized graphical elements to be displayed in full. Subsequently, a number of Fox O&Os and affiliates also began disseminating the AFD No. 10 flag over local news and syndicated programs that the stations broadcast in HD, and have incorporated graphical elements seen during local programs and on-air promos (as well as logo bugs) optimized for the letter boxed presentation.

== Branding ==
=== Station standardization ===
During the early 1990s, Fox began having its stations use a branding structure using a combination of the "Fox" name and the station's channel number, often followed by the licensed call letters (for instance, WNYW in New York City, WTTG in Washington, D.C. and WAGA-TV in Atlanta, Georgia, are all branded as "Fox 5"). By the mid-to-late 1990s, stations minimized their call letters to be just barely readable while still in compliance with FCC identification requirements. This marked the start of the trend for other networks to apply such naming schemes.

The branding scheme has varied in some markets, with some Fox stations using a city or regional name within the branding instead of the channel number (for example, Chicago owned-and-operated station WFLD branded as "Fox Chicago" from 1997 to 2012 and Philadelphia O&O WTXF-TV branded as "Fox Philadelphia" from 1995 to 2003); a few of the network's stations also minimized use of the "Fox" name, opting to use their call letters or a more generic branding (WSVN in Miami, which has branded as "WSVN 7" for general use and "(Channel) 7 News" for its newscasts since it joined the network in January 1989; KHON-TV (channel 2) in Honolulu, which changed its general branding from "Fox 2" to "KHON 2" in 2003; WDRB in Louisville, Kentucky, which dropped its "Fox 41" brand in favor of branding by its call letters in September 2011; and KVRR (channel 15) in Fargo, North Dakota, which dropped the generic "Fox" branding it used in part due to its network of repeater stations throughout eastern North Dakota in favor of branding by its calls in May 2015). Similarly, most of the stations that switched to Fox as a result of its 1994 affiliation deal with New World Communications retained their Big Three-era branding for general or news purposes (with a few exceptions such as WJW in Cleveland, which dropped its CBS-era "TV8" and "Newscenter 8" brands in 1995, in favor of "Fox is ei_{8}ht" as a general brand and ei_{8}ht is News as the title for its newscasts; likewise that same year, KDFW in Dallas/Fort Worth re-branded itself as "Fox 4 Texas" after its newscast name of "News 4 Texas" before shortening its ID to simply "Fox 4" in 1996 and changing its newscast name to "Fox 4 News", both in use since then), before conforming to Fox's station branding conventions when Fox Television Stations acquired New World in 1997.

A particularly unique situation was with KTVU (channel 2) in Oakland-San Francisco, which as a Fox affiliate under longtime owner Cox Media Group, retained its perennial "Channel 2" brand (with limited references as "Fox Channel 2" by the early 1990s). In 1996, the station rebranded as "KTVU Fox 2" for general purposes (adding the Fox logo on the underside of the top line of its heritage "Circle Laser 2" logo as well), while retaining "(KTVU) Channel 2 News" as the branding for its newscasts. Fox Television Stations (which traded WFXT in Boston and WHBQ-TV (channel 13) in Memphis station to Cox in 2014, in exchange for KTVU and sister station KICU-TV) instituted the "KTVU Fox 2" branding full-time in February 2015, retaining the "Circle Laser 2" both within the group's standardized "boxkite" logo and in an alternate version (which would become the primary logo through its de-emphasis of the O&O standardization later that year) placed next to a prominent Fox wordmark. Another situation also includes another Fox station KCPQ in Seattle, Washington, which as a Fox affiliate under Tribune Media and Nexstar Media Group, also retained the "Q13 Fox" name as well as the "Q13 News" name for its newscast until KCPQ dropped the Q13 moniker and rebranded itself to "Fox 13" in September 2021, conforming with the branding of other Fox O&O stations after its acquisition by Fox.

Starting in 2006, more standardization of the O&Os began to take place both on-air and online. All of the network's O&Os began adopting an on-air look more closely aligned with the Fox News Channel, which included a standardized red, white, and blue boxkite-style logo augmented by red pillars (which rotated on air, particularly in the logo bugs seen during newscasts). After News Corporation's acquisition of the social networking site Myspace (which it sold in June 2011 to a consortium that included singer Justin Timberlake among its backers), some Fox O&Os launched websites with identical layouts and similar URL domains under the "MyFox" scheme (such as MyFoxDC.com for WTTG). On-air usage of the FNC-inspired logos was reduced in August 2012 (when a new standardized graphics package was implemented, with wordmark bugs being used during newscasts and other programming), while several of the O&Os ceased using the "MyFox" domains in 2015; the use of the Fox News Channel boxkite logos in all elements, along with explicit connections with the latter, was drastically reduced since the July 2016 resignation of Roger Ailes from Fox for a more traditional and simpler 'call-channel number' horizontal wordmark style which is more flexible with both traditional television and smaller mobile screens. In 2017, Fox's local newscast music composer, Stephen Arnold Music, released a new news music package, "Beyond", that uses none of the Fox News Channel sonic elements associated with the previous Fox O&O music package, and it has rolled out across all Fox O&O local news operations.

As of 2017, Fox O&Os with a sister MyNetworkTV station in that market have also begun to play down that network, with many MyNetworkTV O&Os now taking on the branding of "Fox (channel number) Plus/Xtra/More", etc., suggesting them as an extension of their higher-profile sister Fox station. Several of these stations now also carry extended newscasts or rebroadcasts of earlier newscasts from their sister stations during primetime, pushing MyNetworkTV's schedule to a late-night offering.

=== Logos ===
When Fox launched on October 9, 1986, as Fox Broadcasting Company, it used a logo with three squares containing the network's initials (FBC) in Friz Quadrata font, similar to the BBC's current logo from 1997–present in the UK, while using colors similar to ITV's old logo from 1998-2006. Below it was a rectangle with the network's full name in the same font. This logo was used during the network's first six months in existence and was primarily featured as a network identification slide at the beginning of The Late Show with Joan Rivers. On April 5, 1987, when the network inaugurated its prime time programming, a more familiar logo based on 20th Century Fox's signature logo design was introduced, featuring just the capitalized "FOX" name alongside the familiar trademark searchlights and double-pane platform (Fox's owned-and-operated stations used a variant for station identifications from 1987 to 1989, which incorporated both an "O" and searchlight in negative space, the latter of which intersected the "X" and panes within the otherwise translucent yellow/gold logo; until as late as the mid-1990s, some Fox affiliates that did not license the regulation network logo, or which used CGI to output their station logos with local production houses which tried to emulate the parent network's logo as close as possible, used those that imitated the 20th Century Fox-inspired design in their station logos).

In September 1993, the familiar logo was given a more "hip" makeover, with the "FOX" wordmark overhauled into its current proprietary logotype and the angle changed, removing the tilting (the 1987 logo remained in use during the 1993–94 season in print advertisements featured in TV Guide and other television listings magazines). Starting with the introduction of this logo, the network began displaying an on-screen bug within its programs on the lower right-hand corner of the screen (initially for one minute at the start of each program segment or act, eventually being displayed throughout the program outside commercial breaks, before reverting to the former display format regularly upon the 2009 digital transition). The "O" character also underwent a makeover, acquiring its trademark pillar-like bowl, which has since become a major focal point for the logo and Fox advertising in lieu of the searchlight motif. The "O" is alternately used as a zero character in the station logo of several Fox affiliates which have a tens channel location, including Phoenix's channel 10, KSAZ-TV, and Sacramento affiliate KTXL-TV, channel 40.

Another revised logo was introduced for the 1995–96 television season, removing the searchlights, but retaining the two lower panes and adding a third pane atop the logotype. A variant of the original 1993 design was implemented in 1996, excluding the panes underneath the network name, but restoring the searchlights placed behind the "F" and "X" in the Fox wordmark.

The current version of the logo was introduced in 1999, removing the searchlights completely and switching the logo exclusively to a wordmark design. Despite this, the searchlight theme remained an integral part of 21st Century Fox's branding efforts; they are still incorporated into Fox News Channel's logo, and the universal station logo introduced in 2006 by Fox's owned-and-operated stations – which were retained by the seven former O&Os that Fox Television Stations sold in 2008 to Local TV and had spread to several Fox stations owned by Tribune Broadcasting (including those it acquired through the company's 2013 merger with Local TV; the logo introduced by the O&Os was modified for Tribune's Fox affiliates in 2012 to feature only one searchlight as part of the company's graphical standardizations for those stations) and certain other Fox affiliates not owned or operated by either company. The 1996–99 searchlight logo is still used within the logos of a small number of Fox affiliates; the searchlights continued to be featured in the logo of sister channel FX until a rebranding effort in 2008. The screen bug may have been used from 1999 to 2014; when the network upgraded to high-definition, the watermark placement remained at the 480i format. Until March 14, 2016, they did not display the on-screen bug, just the hashtag missing the Fox bug, used on some affiliates.

For the 2019–20 season, Fox implemented branding elements by Trollbäck + Company with the logo mark slightly thickened, along with animations of the mark with its shapes incorporated into advertising and on-air branding elements (including an animation of the abstract shapes morphing into the main Fox logo).

== Controversy ==
Controversy surrounded the network in 2002 and 2003 over profanity, expressed respectively by Cher and Nicole Richie, aired live during Fox's broadcast of the Billboard Music Awards on its affiliates in the Eastern and Central Time Zones despite the use of five-second audio delays; the indecent material was edited out when the program was broadcast in other time zones from the Mountain Time Zone westward. Both of the obscene instances were condemned by the Parents Television Council, and named by them among the worst instances on television from 2001 to 2004. PTC members filed tens of thousands of complaints to the Federal Communications Commission regarding the broadcasts. A subsequent apology made by Fox representatives was labeled a "sham" by PTC president L. Brent Bozell III, who argued that the network could have easily used an audio delay to edit out the obscene language. As the FCC was investigating the broadcasts, in 2004, Fox announced that it would begin extending live broadcast delays to five minutes from its standard five or ten seconds to more easily be able to edit out obscenities uttered over the air. In June 2007, in the case Federal Communications Commission v. Fox Television Stations, the U.S. Second Circuit Court of Appeals ruled that the FCC could not issue indecency fines against Fox because it does not have the authority to fine broadcasters for fleeting expletives, such as in the case of the Billboard Awards. The FCC eventually decided to appeal the Second Circuit Court's finding. The U.S. Supreme Court granted certiorari and oral arguments in FCC v. Fox, et al., began November 4, 2008.

The Parents Television Council has also criticized many popular Fox shows for perceived indecent content, such as Family Guy, The Simpsons, American Dad!, Futurama, Cops, Hell's Kitchen, 24, House, Married... with Children, Bones, Arrested Development, Prison Break, 'Til Death, Malcolm in the Middle, The O.C., and That '70s Show. The Council sometimes has gone even as far as to file complaints with the Federal Communications Commission regarding indecent content within Fox programming, having done so for That '70s Show and Married by America, having successfully been able to get the FCC to fine the network nearly $1 million for its airing of the latter program. That fine was reduced to $91,000 in January 2009 after an appeal of the fine by Fox was granted as a result of its earlier discovery that the FCC originally claimed to have received 159 complaints regarding the content in Married by America; it later admitted to only receiving 90, which came from only 23 people. A study of the complaints by blogger Jeff Jarvis deduced that all but two were virtually identical to each other, meaning that the $1.2 million judgment was based on original complaints written by a total of only three people. On September 21, 2012, the United States Department of Justice dismissed the lawsuit.

== Presidents of Fox Broadcasting Company Entertainment ==
Executive	Term	Position
Garth Ancier	1986–1989	In 1986, Barry Diller, Jamie Kellner and Rupert Murdoch tapped the then 28-year-old Ancier to be the first Entertainment President for the Fox Broadcasting Company, where he put The Tracey Ullman Show, Married... with Children, 21 Jump Street, Cops, In Living Color, and The Simpsons on the air. Ancier ultimately went from Fox (resigning March 1, 1989) to Disney as president of network television for Walt Disney Studios on April 18, 1989.
Peter Chernin	1989–1992	During Chernin's tenure as president of entertainment for the Fox Broadcasting Company, programming grew from two to seven nights a week. Beverly Hills, 90210 and Herman's Head were launched under Chernin's watch. Fox Kids (originally Fox Children's Network) was also launched under Chernin's watch by its division's president Margaret Loesch.
Sandy Grushow	1992–1995	In this particular leadership role, Grushow oversaw the development and launch of Martin, The X-Files, Melrose Place, New York Undercover, Party of Five and Living Single while also expanding the network from four to seven nights of primetime programming. He also brought Fox Sports to air, including obtaining rights to National Football League (NFL) for the 1994 season.
John Matoian	1995–1996	He officially became the president of Entertainment at Fox Broadcasting in September 1995. However, in 1996, Matoian left Fox and soon he became the president of HBO. Before he left, both MADtv and Millennium were aired under Matoian's tenure, and both Ally McBeal and King of the Hill were greenlit also under his tenure.
Peter Roth	1996–1998	He appeared in a short cameo in the Ally McBeal episode, "Silver Bells". It was first broadcast December 15, 1997. Network shows under Roth's tenure included Ally McBeal, King of the Hill, Buffy the Vampire Slayer, That '70s Show and the game show Guinness World Records Primetime. That '70s Show, The PJs, Futurama, and Family Guy were also greenlit under Roth's tenure.
Doug Herzog	1998–2000	The PJs, Futurama, Family Guy, Malcolm in the Middle, Boston Public, and both reality shows When Animals Attack! and World's Wildest Police Videos were launched under Herzog's watch.
Gail Berman	2000–2005	Network shows under Berman's tenure included American Idol, The Simple Life, Hell's Kitchen, Nanny 911, Arrested Development, The Bernie Mac Show, The War at Home, 24, House, Bones, Prison Break, The O.C., American Dad!, and Family Guy (although the latter debuted during Herzog's era, it was still brought back to Fox under Berman's watch thanks to an overnight success from Adult Swim reruns and its DVD sales).
Peter Liguori	2005–2007	Liguori has been credited with helping the channel FX grow in prominence. Prior to assuming that position in 2005, Liguori was president and CEO of News Corp.'s FX Networks since 1998, overseeing business and programming operations for FX and Fox Movie Channel. 'Til Death and Talkshow with Spike Feresten debuted under Liguori's watch.
Kevin Reilly	2007–2014	Reilly introduced or championed Sleepy Hollow and Brooklyn Nine-Nine, as well as The Following, Fringe, The Cleveland Show, Bob's Burgers, Glee, The Mindy Project, Raising Hope, and New Girl. Reilly also championed a "no pilot season" strategy (designed to nurture fewer new Fox shows with more investment), during which he was responsible for greenlighting hit shows Gotham, The Last Man on Earth, and Empire. He left Fox in May 2014.
David Madden	2014–2017	The NFL coverage of Super Bowl LI would be the second highest viewed Super Bowl coverage during that time. Gotham, The Last Man on Earth, Empire, Lucifer and Lethal Weapon were launched under Madden's tenure, and The X-Files and 24 also returned to the network.
Michael Thorn	2017–present	The Orville, The Gifted, 9–1–1, The Resident, The Great North, Krapopolis, Grimsburg, Universal Basic Guys, The Masked Singer, Lego Masters, Beat Shazam, Name that Tune, and The Floor, as well as the return of American Dad!, among others, were launched under Thorn.

== See also ==
- Foxtel
- Fox Broadcasting Co. v. Dish Network, LLC
- List of United States over-the-air television networks
- Lists of Fox television affiliates
- Lists of United States network television schedules
