= Peter Roth (executive) =

American television producer (born 1950)

Peter Roth (born 1950) is an American television producer, who served as the chairman & chief executive officer of Warner Bros. Television Studios starting in 1999. In 2020, it was announced that Roth would leave the studio in 2021.

== Career ==
Roth graduated from Tufts University in 1972 and began his television career in 1976 as manager and later director of children's programs and VP of current programming for ABC. He then worked as president of Stephen J. Cannell Productions for six years, before joining 20th Television in 1992.

Between 1996 and 1999, he was president of Fox. He then left to become president at Warner Bros. Television. At Fox Broadcasting, he was responsible for bringing America's Most Wanted back from cancellation. He began his overall deal at Warner Bros. with Will & Grace writers David Kohan and Max Mutchnick. He is also a member of the Peabody Awards board of directors, which is presented by the University of Georgia's Henry W. Grady College of Journalism and Mass Communication.

While at Warner Bros. TV, Roth oversaw the development and production of such hits as Two and a Half Men, The Mentalist, ER, The West Wing, Without A Trace, and Friends.

He appeared in a short cameo in the Ally McBeal episode "Silver Bells." It was first broadcast December 15, 1997.

On October 16, 2020, Roth announced he would leave his position as chairman of Warner Bros. Television Group in early 2021.

In October 2021 Batwoman star Ruby Rose cited Roth's behavior on set and treatment of her as part of what she claimed was an abusive and dangerous working environment on the production.

On October 14, 2021, Roth received the 2705th star on the Hollywood Walk of Fame.

Business positions
Preceded by John Matoian	President of FOX; 1996-1998	Succeeded by Doug Herzog
