= The Morning Show with Mike and Juliet =

- Genre: Talk show
- Presented by: Mike Jerrick; Juliet Huddy
- Country of origin: United States

Production
- Running time: 60 minutes
- Production company: 20th Television

Original release
- Network: Syndicated
- Release: January 22, 2007 – June 12, 2009

The Morning Show with Mike and Juliet is an American syndicated morning talk show. Produced by Fox, the show first aired on January 22, 2007, to a number of markets originally through Fox and MyNetworkTV, most in the Fox Television Stations Group. Hosted by Mike Jerrick and Juliet Huddy, the program consisted of celebrity interviews, audience participation, and segments relating to viewers. The last live show aired on June 12, 2009, with reruns continuing through until September 2009.

== Overview ==
Jerrick and Huddy had hosted other news shows in the past, notably DaySide and Fox & Friends Weekend, a weekend morning show, both on the Fox News Channel.

In February 2007, the show was syndicated to many ABC, NBC, CBS and The CW affiliates where a MyNetworkTV or Fox station didn't carry it.

== Ratings and cancellation ==
On January 8, 2009, Bob Cook, president and CEO of 20th Television, announced The Morning Show was cancelled, with new episodes continuing to air until June and reruns following until September.

== Social critiques of hosts ==
Television critics have noted that the program was unique in having two single hosts, who openly play up their marital status, seemingly abandoning traditional dictates that television morning hours be limited to "family values and sanctimony."

== "Spaghetti Cat" incident ==
In August 2008, The Morning Show became known for a seemingly bizarre variation of the bleep censor, censoring dialogue in a segment on binge drinking by cutting to a photograph of a cat eating spaghetti. The occurrence was pointed out on an episode of The Soup on August 15, where even host Joel McHale acknowledged the absurdity of the image, proclaiming the occurrence "for lack of a better word, art", and pointed out that it was not an edited clip (as the show has often done for comedic intent). A spokesperson dubbed it a "bleep photo", stating that "you're gonna see a lot more of those in the future." The Spaghetti Cat (impersonated by a crude puppet) made several cameo appearances in later episodes of The Soup.
