= Michael Thorn =

Michael Thorn (born 1969 or 1970) is an American television producer and media executive.

== Career ==
Thorn was a producer on Teen Wolf (2011–2017) for MTV, since its pilot. He was an executive at Lost Marbles Television, the production company behind the series. He was head of drama development for NBC's studio and network.

Thorn joined 21st Century Fox's television studio in 2010, becoming executive vice president of program development. He oversaw This Is Us, which was broadcast on NBC to high audiences.

In August 2017, Thorn replaced David Madden as president of Fox Broadcasting Company's entertainment division. Two years later, in charge of Fox Entertainment which had separated from its parent after the Acquisition of 21st Century Fox by Disney, he enlisted Teen Wolf creator Jeff Davis on a contract to develop broadcast-only drama series.

In 2023, Thorn told The Hollywood Reporter that his company was different to rivals who were making cuts after expanding into streaming; "Because we’re not high volume, we try to offer the best process possible that’s not bogged down by layers." In March 2024, CEO Rob Wade promoted Thorn to president of Fox Television Network, overseeing unscripted series such as The Masked Singer in addition to his previous work with scripted television.
