= Juliet Huddy =

American radio host and former news anchor (born 1969)

- Born: Juliet AnnMarie Huddy; September 27, 1969 (age 57); Miami Beach, Florida, U.S.
- Occupations: Talk radio host Podcaster; Television news anchor
- Spouse: John Fattoruso

Juliet AnnMarie Huddy (born September 27, 1969) is an American talk radio host, podcaster and former news anchor. From January 2021 until Winter 2022 she co-hosted the 5 a.m. to 6:00 a.m. Early News show with Frank Morano on WABC 770 in New York City. She previously co-hosted the mid-day 12-3pm show with Curtis Sliwa on 770 WABC. She also hosts a podcast on the OG Podcast Network called "Juliet: UNEXPECTED". Prior to that, she had been the news and entertainment anchor for the Bernie and Sid Show in morning drive, also airing on WABC in New York City. Earlier, she was a co-anchor of Good Day Wake Up on Fox 5 NY WNYW, alongside Ben Simmoneau. She was formerly the host of The Morning Show with Mike and Juliet on Fox News. She also was an anchor for the Fox News Channel.

== Early life and career ==
Huddy was born in Miami Beach, Florida, the daughter of John, a television producer, and Erica Huddy, a singer/performer. She graduated from Langley High School (McLean, Virginia) in 1987 and earned a degree in political science with a minor in sociology at the University of Missouri.

After completing her formal education, she began her news journalism career at age 23 as a reporter/producer for KARO-FM's morning newscast in Columbia, Missouri. She later relocated to Ventura, California to join KADY-TV — a station owned by her mother and father – where she initially worked as the station's promotions director and executive producer but later turned to reporting at the Ventura County News Network. As promotions director, she won numerous ADDY awards.

She was executive producer of "Armed Response", a finalist for the IRIS award given by the National Association of Television Program Executives (NATPE).

After more than five years working in California, Huddy relocated to Jacksonville, Florida to work for WAWS as a general-assignment reporter for the station's nightly newscast. She also worked as a news anchor for WFYV-FM's morning radio program The Lex and Terry Show and a regular on The KiddChris Show, at WYSP/Philadelphia.

== Fox News ==
She joined Fox News in March 1998 as a reporter at the Miami bureau, but later on moved to the New York studios where she presented a variety of news programs including Entertainment Coast to Coast, and occasionally filled in for E. D. Hill on Fox & Friends. She also was a rotating co-host of Fox and Friends First, later becoming a permanent co-host of Fox & Friends Weekend alongside Mike Jerrick and Julian Phillips. In the summer of 2005, Huddy began co-hosting DaySide with Jerrick. She started a blog on the DaySide homepage, called Juliet's DaySide Dish.

== History with Verizon ==
In 2000, Huddy became a Verizon employee doing voices for the operator service platform and the error messages for Verizon landlines, She became the voice on Verizon Wireless messages as well in 2006 after James Earl Jones failed to renew his contract with the telecommunications company. She also worked with Bell Atlantic (soon to become Verizon).

== Move to syndication ==
During the summer of 2006, Fox News announced that the network would cease production of Dayside, in addition to the news that Fox Broadcasting was planning to produce a new breakfast television show for syndication, beginning with television stations owned by the Fox Television Stations. The new program, akin to DaySide, would be hosted by Jerrick and Huddy, requiring them to leave Fox News for the syndicated program. The program was initially promoted to feature elements of both programs the hosts have been a part of, DaySide and Fox & Friends. When officially launched on January 22, 2007, The Morning Show with Mike and Juliet aired with both hosts, Huddy producing a video blog for the program. The show was not renewed and stopped taping new episodes in June 2009.

After the show's cancellation in 2009, Huddy returned to Fox News and worked as a newscaster. She was a frequent guest on Red Eye w/ Greg Gutfeld, Fox News' late night satire program and was featured in a weekly segment "Did You See That" on The O'Reilly Factor.

She was the anchor of WNYW Fox 5's Good Day Wake Up, with Co-Anchor Ben Simmoneau and a fill-in Reporter for Good Day New York in New York City, until September 2016, announcing her departure.

== Personal life ==
Huddy is married to musician John Fattoruso. This is her fourth marriage. In 2026 she left the US for The Hague, The Netherlands.

Her brother, John Huddy, is a former Fox News journalist who was based in Jerusalem. He was terminated by Fox on October 23, 2017, the same day that Juliet Huddy appeared on Megyn Kelly Today to discuss her sexual harassment claims against former Fox News host Bill O'Reilly.

== Sexual harassment lawsuit ==
In January 2017, Huddy settled a suit with Fox News alleging sexual harassment from long-time Fox anchor Bill O'Reilly and co-president Jack Abernethy.

Huddy is portrayed in the movie Bombshell by Jennifer Morrison.

== See also ==
- New Yorkers in journalism
