= Sandy Grushow =

American businessman

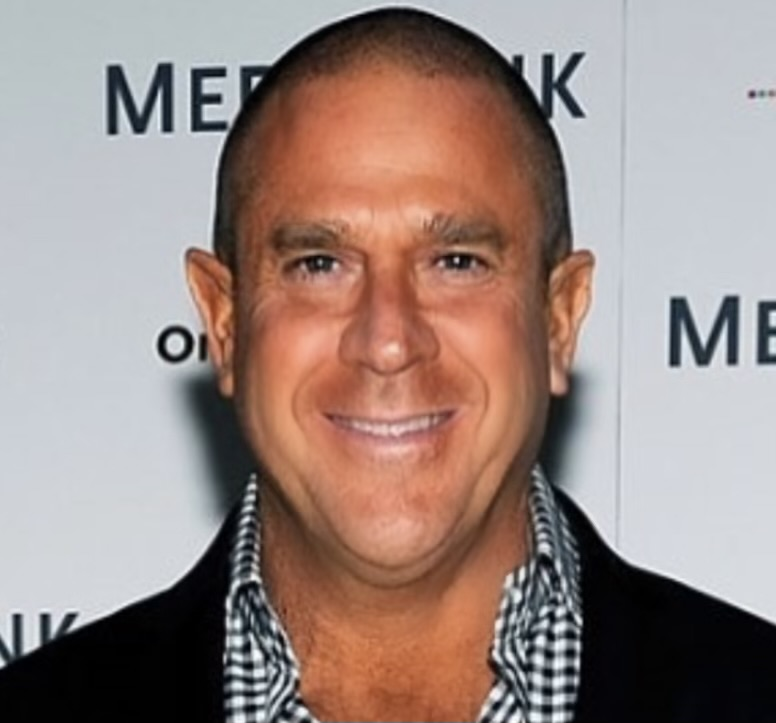
- Born: April 3, 1960 (age 66); New York City, New York, U.S.
- Education: University of California, Los Angeles (B.A.)
- Occupations: Chief Executive Officer, Phase 2 Media

Sandy Grushow (born April 3, 1960) is an American businessman, and the CEO of Phase 2 Media, a board member for The Weather Company (parent company of The Weather Channel) and works with MediaLink in the role of senior media advisor.

He is the former chairman of the Fox Television Entertainment Group and former chief creative officer of MediaLink, a multimedia advisory firm that provides counsel to clients in the marketing, media, entertainment, and technology industries.

== Early life and education ==
Grushow was born to a Jewish family on April 3, 1960, in New York City. He graduated summa cum laude/Phi Beta Kappa from the University of California at Los Angeles, with a B.A. in communications.

== Fox ==
Grushow spent nearly 25 years at the Fox Entertainment Group, where he helped to create the Fox Broadcasting Company as it appears today. Grushow began his career in the feature film marketing department of 20th Century Fox, overseeing creative campaigns for movies such as Big, Die Hard and Broadcast News. In 1988, Grushow was asked by then chairman Barry Diller to invigorate Fox's new broadcast TV network as he had the motion picture studio. Grushow built the network's advertising and promotions department from the ground up between 1988 and 1990, launching signature FOX hits The Simpsons, In Living Color, Cops and 90210. In addition to marketing, Grushow added programming and scheduling responsibilities to his purview in 1990 when he was named executive vice president of the Fos entertainment division. In 1992, at the age of 32, Grushow assumed the presidency of the Fox Entertainment Group entire network division, making him the youngest executive to ever hold the title of network president. In that leadership role, Grushow oversaw the development and launch of The X-Files, Melrose Place, Party of Five, Living Single and MADtv while also expanding the network from four to seven nights of primetime programming and acquiring broadcast rights to NFL football games in December 1993. He was fired in September of 1994 after Fox's prime time ratings remained stagnant despite the NFL addition, but he returned in 1996 to build Fox's television studio division, 20th Century Fox Television Grushow inherited an eighth-place studio with five shows on the air. With Grushow at the helm as president, the studio's output ballooned to 22 shows; surpassing Warner Bros. Television to become the top ranked studio. In 1999, Grushow was tapped by Rupert Murdoch and Peter Chernin to return to the network he helped build. In a new role as chairman of the Fox Television Entertainment Group, Grushow oversaw both the television studio and the network. Over the next five years, his group helped develop and launch broadcast stalwarts Malcolm in the Middle, Titus, Boston Public, Dark Angel, American Idol, 24, The O.C., The Bernie Mac Show, and finally, House.

Business positions
Preceded by Peter Chernin	President of Fox Entertainment; 1992-1994	Succeeded by John Matoian
Preceded by	Chairman of Fox Entertainment; 1999-2004	Succeeded by

== Filmaka ==
After restarting the network's scripted and non-scripted programming, Grushow set out to focus on the nascent digital content arena. While leading Filmaka, an online community of more than 20,000 writers and directors spread across over 150 countries creating digital shorts and branded entertainment, Grushow guided some of the earliest relationships between new technology digital creatives and blue-chip marketers such as DirecTV and Ford. The company's projects helped establish the practice of major brands using user-generated content competitions to engage audiences across multiple media platforms including the web, broadcast, and mobile.

== Medialink ==
In 2010, Grushow joined MediaLink as Chief Content Officer, counseling clients in the marketing, media, entertainment, and technology industries. In this role, Grushow has advised on brand/content/distribution partnerships involving numerous Fortune 100 brands in the CPG, automotive, and beverage categories, and major digital distribution players.

== Personal life ==
His wife is Barbara Grushow. They live in Los Angeles.
