= Mike Jerrick =

American television host (born 1950)

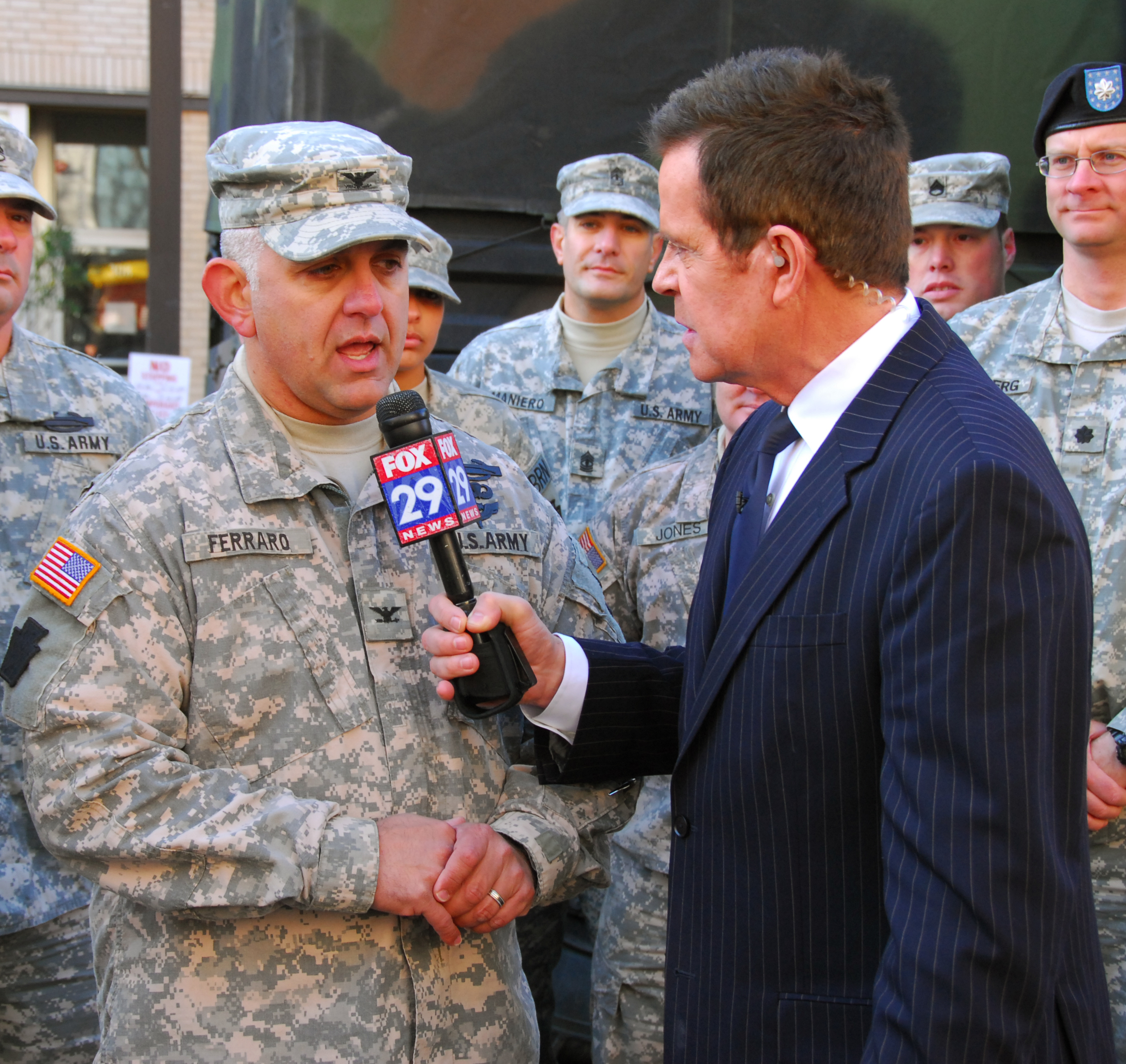
- Jerrick (right) in 2009
- Born: July 3, 1950 (age 76); Wichita, Kansas, US
- Education: University of Kansas (BS)
- Occupations: Morning Anchor, Talk Show Host
- Notable credit(s): PM Magazine, The Morning Show with Mike and Juliet, DaySide, Fox & Friends
- Children: 2
- Website: Fox 29 Philadelphia

Michael Eugene Joseph Jerrick (born July 3, 1950) is a news anchor and late night talk host and former co-host with Juliet Huddy of the morning program The Morning Show with Mike and Juliet, which began in January 2007. The last live episode of the show aired in June 2009. Jerrick joined WTXF in Philadelphia as a co-host of Good Day Philadelphia in 1999. He left the station in October 2002 to join Fox News Channel, where he served as a weekend co-host of Fox & Friends. He later co-hosted DaySide and appeared as a recurring guest co-anchor on WNYW's Good Day New York. He returned to WTXF and Good Day Philadelphia in July 2009.

In September 2025, Jerrick began hosting MIKE, a locally produced late-night talk show on WTXF. The half-hour program airs weeknights at 11:30 p.m. and features interviews, comedy sketches and musical performances. Jerrick continued simultaneously as co-host of Good Day Philadelphia.

== Life and career ==
Jerrick was raised in Wichita. He attended Chaplain Kapaun Memorial High School, a Jesuit-run boys' school, which later merged to become Kapaun Mount Carmel Catholic High School. The Wichita native started his career at Topeka's WIBW-TV in Kansas, when future colleague Steve Doocy was at WIBW's crosstown rival, KSNT-TV. Jerrick later worked at WNYW in New York as a producer and later host, before moving to San Francisco's KPIX-TV.

During the mid-80s, Jerrick served as co-host for the USA Network afternoon talk show Alive and Well. He hosted two unsold game show pilots, What Are My True Colors in 1987 and Perfect Match in 1991. He also appeared on HBO's World Entertainment Report, before moving to the Sci-Fi Channel's Sci-Fi Buzz and later hosting What's News on America's Talking, a short-lived cable news channel. Soon after, he hosted CNBC's America After Hours, and moved to WTXF as the morning host on Good Day Philadelphia. He came to the Fox News Channel in 2002.

After his daytime talk show, The Morning Show with Mike & Juliet, was cancelled, Jerrick returned to Philadelphia, and now co-hosts Fox 29's Good Day Philadelphia. He is occasionally called back to New York as a substitute on Fox & Friends Weekend.

On Wednesday April 1, 2015, Jerrick announced his candidacy for Mayor of Philadelphia for the 2015 elections. This announcement was made on Good Day Philadelphia, and Jerrick received multiple messages of support. It was revealed to have been an April Fools' joke.

In January 2017 Jerrick was suspended for a week by Fox 29. On the 23rd, Jerrick, co-host Alex Holley, and guests were discussing Trump advisor Kellyanne Conway's now infamous 'alternative facts' claim when he said that she was 'good at bullshit'. Holley immediately responded 'We're sorry for that', and Jerrick apologized as well. Management immediately suspended Jerrick for the rest of the week for using a word considered to be offensive on live television. He returned to the air on January 30 with an apology to Holley and viewers, who had shown support for him on the station's social media during his absence.

In May 2024, Jerrick was diagnosed with prostate cancer. He underwent surgery to remove his prostate and was absent from Good Day Philadelphia for several weeks while recovering, returning to the program in July. He subsequently underwent radiation treatment, which he completed in May 2025.
