= David Madden (executive) =

American media executive

David Madden is an American media executive.

== Career ==
Madden graduated from Harvard University in 1976. He took part in theater at university, and was an aspiring novelist, but at age 23 his novel was rejected by publishers. He dropped out of the University of California, Los Angeles shortly before attaining a master's degree in English Literature, and started in the film industry.

Madden was one half of the Cort/Madden Company with Robert W. Cort. Among their production credits was 2004's HBO television film Something the Lord Made, which won the Primetime Emmy Award for Outstanding Television Movie. He also had executive roles at Interscope Communications, which he had joined in 1987, Paramount Pictures and 20th Century Fox.

In 2000, Madden became executive vice president of Fox TV Pictures. He became president of Fox Television Studios in 2010 and signed a new contract in April 2014. He helped develop shows like The Shield and The Americans. In August 2014, he became president of Fox Entertainment Group.

In August 2017, Madden left Fox and was succeeded by Michael Thorn, moving on in the following month to be head of original programming for AMC Networks' AMC, Sundance TV and AMC Studios. He left two years later when network president Sarah Barnett folded the studios into AMC Entertainment.

In February 2020, Madden was hired as president of Greg Berlanti's Berlanti Productions. He left at the end of his contract in April 2022, after working on series such as Superman & Lois and All American: Homecoming for The CW. That July, he was hired as head of global entertainment at Wattpad Webtoon Studios.
