= John Matoian =

Television industry executive from the USA

- Born: 1948; Fresno, California
- Occupations: Teacher and television industry executive

John Matoian (born 1948) is a former teacher and television industry executive. He was a vice-president of the CBS Entertainment division. He later became the president of Entertainment at Fox Broadcasting in September 1995. He was president at HBO from 1996 to 1999. He received his B.A. from Stanford University.

Matoian is a native of Fresno and is of Armenian descent.

In the 2012 United States Presidential election, John Matoian had made $83,800 worth of contributions to Barack Obama's successful presidential campaign.

In his book Springfield Confidential, Mike Reiss mentions Matoian by name as the Fox executive whose intense hatred of his and Al Jean's animated series The Critic led to its cancellation after a single season on the network.
