= Columbia Pictures Television =

American television studio (1974–2001)

Columbia Pictures Television, Inc.
- Final logo, used from 1992 to 2001
- Type: Division
- Industry: Television production Television syndication
- Predecessors: Screen Gems; Tri-Star Television (first incarnation)
- Founded: May 6, 1974; 52 years ago Burbank, California, United States
- Defunct: January 1, 2001; 25 years ago
- Fate: Folded into Columbia TriStar Television
- Successor: Columbia TriStar Television
- Headquarters: 10202 West Washington Boulevard, Culver City, California, United States
- Area served: Worldwide
- Owner: The Coca-Cola Company (1982–1988); Sony Corporation of America (1989–2001)
- Parent: Columbia Pictures Industries (1974–1983); Columbia Pictures Entertainment (1987–1991); Sony Pictures Entertainment (1991–2001)

Columbia Pictures Television, Inc. (abbreviated as CPT) was an American television production and distribution company owned by Sony Pictures Entertainment. It was the third name of Columbia Pictures's television division, itself formerly known as Screen Gems and Pioneer Telefilms. The company was active until January 1, 2001, when it was folded into Columbia TriStar Television, a merger between Columbia Pictures Television and TriStar Television (which is currently known as Sony Pictures Television). A separate entity, which uses the initials of CPT, still exists as an in-name-only unit, called "CPT Holdings, Inc.", which holds copyrights to the television series The Young and the Restless, as well as older properties such as What's Happening!!.

== History ==
=== Screen Gems (1948–1974) ===
Screen Gems was the name of Columbia Pictures' television studio from November 1948 to May 6, 1974 and during that time, produced shows such as Bewitched, The Flying Nun, The Partridge Family, I Dream of Jeannie and The Monkees. It was one of the largest television producers in history, and it was around that time, one of the few television subsidiaries of a major movie studio that didn't carry the film studio's name. It was highly profitable until 1974, when its name was changed to Columbia Pictures Television.

=== Reincorporation as CPT and early years (1974–1982) ===
The studio changed its name from Screen Gems to Columbia Pictures Television on May 6, 1974. This reincorporation was suggested by David Gerber, who was executive vice president of the studio, displacing Art Frankel when he was at Screen Gems. He announced plans to launch a separate unit to concentrate on movie-of-the-week titles. John H. Mitchell, who had been president of the studio since 1958 when the studio was Screen Gems, said that they would take the division more closely to the parent company and to help achieve an interrelationship among all of its divisions.

As the successor in interest to Screen Gems, it assumed productions of the daytime soap operas Days of Our Lives and The Young and the Restless, as well as the NBC police show Police Story. The first series produced under the CPT name was the sitcom That's My Mama, which was slated to be a Screen Gems production. Other new series that were slated to be Screen Gems productions were Nakia, Born Free and Police Woman.

By the summer of 1974, Columbia Pictures Television planned to syndicate ten one-hour musical specials that were set to be taped in Las Vegas nightclubs, and the programs were simulcasted on FM Radio to be set up by Yuri Zabran to premiere as early as 1975. In September 1974, Columbia had signed Abby Mann to develop long-form television projects, and the first project to came out of the deal was Medical Story.

In 1975, Carl Reiner joined Columbia Pictures Television to serve as executive producer and host of the show Good Heavens, which was for the ABC television network. Also, on July 1, 1975, former NBC vice president Larry White had set up his own production company Larry White Productions with a deal at Columbia Pictures Television. On May 10, 1976, White then joined the studio to displace Gerber as his program chief, who subsequently restarted plans to launch its own CPT-based production company.

In early June 1977, CPT acquired worldwide distribution rights to Barney Miller and Fish from Danny Arnold, Barnaby Jones from Quinn Martin, and Soap from Witt/Thomas Productions. In mid-June, CPT acquired domestic distribution rights to four series from Spelling-Goldberg Productions such as S.W.A.T., Starsky & Hutch, Charlie's Angels, and Family. Later on in 1977, former MGM Television president Harris Katleman and Universal Television producer Harve Bennett joined forces to form Bennett/Katleman Productions with a deal at the studio. Also in 1978, Larry White was promoted to president of the studio.

In mid-February 1979, CPT acquired TOY Productions, whose output included What's Happening!! and Carter Country. In 1981, Richard Dawson signed a joint development contract with Rastar Television and Columbia Pictures Television to produce television shows. On August 13, 1981, CPT acquired the television assets of Time Life. A year later, Columbia partnered with HBO and CBS to form TriStar Pictures.

On May 7, 1982, Columbia Pictures acquired Spelling-Goldberg Productions for more than $40 million. Around the same time, former ABC executive Barbara Corday started a new CPT-affiliated production company, Can't Sing Can't Dance Productions.

=== The Coca-Cola years (1982–1987) ===
The 1980s brought significant changes to CPT. In mid-June 1982, beverage company The Coca-Cola Company bought Columbia Pictures for $750 million. By mid-November 1982, CPT agreed to license domestic distribution rights to Spelling-Goldberg's Family to Lexington Broadcast Services Company.

In mid-February 1983, producer Roy Huggins signed a deal with the studio, and in mid-May, Columbia Pictures Television secured an agreement with Centerpoint to co-produce miniseries such as Sadat and The Last Days of Pompeii. By early September, actress Suzanne Somers (via Hamel/Somers Productions) signed a deal with the studio.

By December 1983, Coca-Cola formed CPT Holdings, Inc. in the process of splitting CPT from Columbia Pictures Industries. As a result, CPT immediately became the core division of this new entity. By late January 1984, CPT and LBS formed a joint venture for barter syndication, called Colex Enterprises, which would distribute several properties from CPT's library such as Father Knows Best and The Monkees, while throughout the 1980s and 1990s, other shows such as Bewitched, I Dream of Jeannie, and The Partridge Family were licensed to The Program Exchange. The same year, CPT acquired distribution rights to Benson. In late 1984, Barbara Corday took over as president of the studio. Another high-profile deal at CPT arrived in August 1984 when North Ave. Productions (backed by Michael S. Baser and Kim Weiskopf) signed with CPT after leaving 20th Century Fox Television (now 20th Television), while George Schenck and Frank Cardea (via Schenck/Cardea Productions) reupped their contract with CPT.

By mid-June 1985, Norman Lear and Jerry Perenchio sold their company, Embassy Communications, Inc. (whose divisions consisted of Embassy Pictures, Embassy Television, Tandem Productions, and Embassy Home Entertainment) to Coca-Cola, resulting in Coca-Cola gaining the rights to such shows as All in the Family, Sanford and Son, The Jeffersons, Good Times, Maude, Diff'rent Strokes, Archie Bunker's Place, The Facts of Life, One Day at a Time, Who's the Boss?, and Silver Spoons, among others. AITF, however, was still distributed by Viacom Enterprises at the time. Coke also made plans to spin off Embassy Pictures and Embassy Home Entertainment. Under Coca-Cola's ownership, Embassy saw success with 227 and Married... with Children. The same year, CPT and LBS launched What's Happening Now!! in first-run syndication. The show was a sequel to the 1970s ABC sitcom What's Happening!!. Also that year, Barney Rosenzweig (via The Rosenzweig Company) had signed a three-year distribution deal with the studio to distribute their own projects. During that year, CPT revived the previous Screen Gems brand name to market classic television shows for syndication.

By mid-September 1985, CPT acquired domestic distribution rights to three series from Stephen J. Cannell Productions, such as Hardcastle and McCormick, Riptide and The Rousters. At the time the acquisition was announced, the latter of the three series was cancelled but no plans were made yet to put it in syndication, hence it not being mentioned. The former was subsequently put in syndication by the above mentioned Colex Enterprises.

Major changes took place in 1986. By early May, Coke acquired Merv Griffin Enterprises, producer of the popular series, Dance Fever, The Merv Griffin Show, and the two game shows, Jeopardy! and Wheel of Fortune; (the nighttime versions were distributed by King World and later, CBS Media Ventures). However, Sony Pictures Television holds off-net syndication rights to these shows, mainly broadcasting them on Game Show Network, while sister company Sony Pictures Home Entertainment holds home video rights. By mid-May 1986, Joe Indelli, president of Columbia Pictures Television Distribution, resigned in order to launch a new company that was owned by MTM Enterprises to syndicate its own programs and Robert King, who was partner of The Television Program Source, would replace him.

Also in 1986, Embassy Television, Embassy Telecommunications, and Tandem Productions were all merged into Embassy Communications; the Tandem unit ceased production to be used after the cancellation of Diff'rent Strokes but remained in-name-only, while the Columbia and Embassy units continued to exist separately. Also on the same year on August 28, CPT acquired Danny Arnold's Four D Productions, Inc. for $50 million. On November 24, 1986, Coca-Cola regrouped CPT, Embassy Communications, and Merv Griffin Enterprises, forming a new subsidiary, Coca-Cola Television and a first-run syndication unit, Coca-Cola Telecommunications, from a merger between two units of CPT: its first-run syndication branch and The Television Program Source (a joint venture with Alan Bennett and former King World president Robert King that was created on October 15, 1984, which Coca-Cola had a small investment in originally, and notably distributed the 1985–1986 nighttime syndicated version of The Price Is Right and was slated to distribute a new version of Match Game for syndication beginning in 1987). It was headed by Gary Rosenthal, who was leading Embassy Telecommunications, and also inserted was a new subsidiary Coca-Cola Television Operations. On September 9, 1986, Columbia Pictures Television's European division expanded its branch, producing programming for ITV franchisee holders, such as HTV, and added new co-productions from other ITV franchisees such as Anglia Television and Yorkshire Television.

Distribution of some programs, such as What's Happening Now!!, The Real Ghostbusters, Punky Brewster and Dinosaucers, was also shifted to Coca-Cola Telecommunications. The former two were previously distributed by CPT, while the latter two were slated to be distributed by CPT. CPT acquired the rights to Punky, a former NBC in-house production, because Financial Interest and Syndication Rules prevented the network from producing more episodes for syndication after they cancelled it. During the fall of 1986, the sitcom Designing Women began a successful seven-year run on CBS. The same year, Tri-Star Pictures formed Tri-Star Television, which produced the short-lived series Downtown. More series from Tri-Star Television debuted in 1987, such as Take Five, Nothing in Common, My Two Dads, Werewolf, and Buck James. Also that same year, Clyde Phillips joined the studio as an independent television producer.

In 1987, a major reorganization shook up at Columbia/Embassy Television, whereas Embassy employee Glenn Patrick resigned to start his own film and television production company, and Barbara Corday was appointed as president at the studio. The Columbia name would now be used for dramatic shows, while the Embassy name would be used for comedic output. Owing to the association with Castle Rock Entertainment, CPT signed on to handle international distribution and off-net syndication of Castle Rock's properties, because Columbia had a 40% interest in the studio.

=== Columbia Pictures Entertainment (1987–1989) ===
On December 18, 1987, following the notoriously critical and financial failure of the film Ishtar, Coca-Cola spun off its entertainment holdings, selling them to Tri-Star Pictures, Inc. (which it partially owned at the time) for $3.1 billion. Tri-Star was then immediately renamed as Columbia Pictures Entertainment. CPT Holdings then became a standalone entity separate from CPT. As a result, Columbia/Embassy Television and Tri-Star Television were merged to create a new Columbia Pictures Television. Embassy Communications was immediately reduced to an in-name-only unit and renamed as ELP Communications, which would primarily be active as the copyright holder for shows produced by Embassy. Meanwhile, Coca-Cola Telecommunications and the distribution arm of Embassy Communications were merged, becoming Columbia Pictures Television Distribution.

As a result, many of the staff, including Barbara Corday, who had been president of the studio since 1984, as well as former presidents Herman Rush and Peter Seale, were laid off and replaced mostly by Tri-Star alumnus, such as Scott Siegler, who was president of the studio, and former Columbia/Embassy Television executives were assigned to the new unit, namely Gary Lieberthal and Barry Thurston. Other executives retained by CPE included Arnold Mesnser, who was previously president of Tri-Star Telecommunications. Mesnser immediately took over the responsibilities of Rush and Seale and still had an unspecified corporate operation at CPE's headquarters for the New York area. Rush and Seale had plans to set up a new syndication company to handle some product previously handled by CCT. On February 2, 1988, former Columbia/Embassy Television vice president Barry Thurston became president of Columbia Pictures Television Distribution. On December 26, 1988, writer Pamela Pettler signed a deal with the studio.

On February 2, 1989, Columbia Pictures Television formed a joint venture with Norman Lear's Act III Communications, called Act III Television, which would produce television series, with no management planned for them.

=== The Sony years to the end (1989–2001) ===
On November 8, 1989, Sony bought Columbia Pictures Entertainment for $3.4 billion, and the next day, Sony acquired The Guber-Peters Entertainment Company (formerly game show production company Barris Industries with the library of game shows including The Newlywed Game, The Dating Game, and The Gong Show) for $200 million after hiring film producers Peter Guber and Jon Peters to run the company. On November 5, 1990, CPE folded its first-run syndication unit Guber-Peters Television into Columbia Pictures Television Distribution. On August 7, 1991, CPE changed its name to Sony Pictures Entertainment and TriStar Television was relaunched on October 10. That year, the company signed a deal with Brillstein-Grey Entertainment to distribute its programming.

Throughout the 1990s, the studio launched such successful shows for Columbia such as Beakman's World on TLC and CBS in 1992, Ricki Lake in syndication which lasted 11 years, Party of Five on Fox, NewsRadio on NBC, and the short-lived cult following animated series The Critic on ABC and Fox in 1994, and for TriStar such as Mad About You on NBC in 1992, Forever Knight on CBS, first-run syndication, and USA in 1992, The Nanny on CBS in 1993, Malcolm & Eddie on UPN in 1996, and Early Edition on CBS in 1996. One of the most successful by far was Seinfeld, a Castle Rock Entertainment production which Columbia began distributing in off-net syndication years later.

In early 1992, CPT had the potential to license the off-net syndication rights to future series to a company backed by a joint venture between RHI Entertainment and Trilogy Entertainment Group. On August 21, 1992, Columbia's subsidiary CAT Holdings, Inc. (Columbia Act III Television) and Franklin/Waterman Entertainment created a joint venture called Franklin/Waterman 2. On December 7, 1992, SPE acquired the game show library of Barry & Enright Productions. Later that year, director Jonathan Lynn had signed a deal with the studio to develop their own television projects, including an NBC series commitment.

By the beginning of May 1993, CPT and MCA TV formed their barter divisions. CPT's barter division was called Columbia Pictures Television Advertising Sales (a.k.a. "Columbia Television Advertising Sales"). This division handled series by TriStar Television and Merv Griffin Enterprises, as well as off-net series by Castle Rock Entertainment, HBO Independent Productions, and Brillstein-Grey Entertainment. CPT used other companies such as Group W Productions for Beakman's World, MTV's One World Entertainment for Married... with Children, and Tribune Entertainment for Designing Women. From 1994 until March 1996, the company distributed programming made by the CapCities/ABC-Brillstein-Grey joint venture Brillstein-Grey Communications until MCA purchased an investment made by the parent company.

==== Merger with TriStar Television, restructuring, and expansion (1994–2001) ====
On February 21, 1994, a few years after takeover by Sony Pictures Entertainment, Columbia Pictures Television and TriStar Television merged under the leadership of Jon Feltheimer and the two combined studios became Columbia TriStar Television. After the merger, Columbia Pictures Television Distribution was renamed as Columbia TriStar Television Distribution.

During that year, SPE inherited a vast back catalog of independently produced game shows through the acquisition of Stewart Television. Along with the Merv Griffin, Chuck Barris, Barry & Enright, and CPT game shows they had already owned, these were part of the basis of the Game Show Network, launched on December 1, 1994. In 1998, ELP Communications stopped producing all of its remaining programs, rendering it now reduced to holding copyrights to its library, with its remaining operations completely folded. By 1997, most new shows, as well as some existing CPT shows like Party of Five, were produced by CTT, and Sony Television Entertainment was reorganized as Columbia TriStar Television Group.

On July 1, 2000, Barry Thurston stepped down as president of Columbia TriStar Television Distribution after 17 years and was succeeded by then-current president, Steve Mosko. On January 1, 2001, Columbia Pictures Television was officially folded into Columbia TriStar Television, with Days of Our Lives and Walker Texas Ranger being the last known shows to feature the separate CPT logo, just in time when NBC started using split-screen credits. On October 25, 2001, CTT and CTTD merged to form Columbia TriStar Domestic Television.

On September 16, 2002, Sony Pictures changed the name of its television division to Sony Pictures Television.

== See also ==
- List of Sony Pictures Television programs
- Sony Pictures Television
- Columbia TriStar Television
- TriStar Television
- Screen Gems (1948–1974)
- Columbia Pictures
- TriStar Pictures
- Triumph Films

== Notes and references ==
=== Bibliography ===
- Perry, Jeb H. (1991). Screen Gems: A History of Columbia Pictures Television from Cohn to Coke, 1948-1983. ISBN 0-8108-2487-6.
