= American Dream (TV series) =

1981 American drama television series

- Genre: Drama
- Created by: Ronald M. Cohen; Barbara Corday; Ken Hecht
- Developed by: Barney Rosenzweig
- Starring: George Barrow; Stephen Macht; Karen Carlson; Hans Conried; Michael Hershewe; Timothy Owen Waldrip; Andrea Smith
- Opening theme: "Chasin' the American Dream" performed by Jim Gilstrap
- Composers: David Spear; Artie Butler
- Country of origin: United States
- Original language: English
- No. of seasons: 1
- No. of episodes: 8 (3 unaired)

Production
- Executive producers: William Blinn; Jerry Thorpe; Mace Neufeld
- Producers: Barney Rosenzweig; Ronald M. Cohen
- Running time: 42 minutes
- Production companies: Blinn/Thorpe Productions; Viacom Productions; Mace Neufeld Productions

Original release
- Network: ABC
- Release: April 26 – June 10, 1981

American Dream is an American drama television series created by Ronald M. Cohen. The series stars George Barrow, Stephen Macht, Karen Carlson, Hans Conried, Michael Hershewe, Timothy Owen Waldrip and Andrea Smith. The series aired on ABC from April 26, 1981, to June 10, 1981.

The series concerned a father (Macht) who worried that his children were learning bigotry and superficial values in the suburbs. So moved his wife, Donna, and three children (teenage Casey and pre-teens Todd and Jenny) to multiracial urban Chicago. There, Donna's father, Sam, moved in.

Although ABC said the show would continue as a 1981-82 midseason replacement, it was pulled from the schedule with two of its initial seven episodes unaired.

The series was developed by Barney Rosenzweig and co-created by Barbara Corday. Both would go on to produce (Rosenzweig) and co-create (Corday) Cagney & Lacey for CBS the following season.

== Cast ==
- Stephen Macht as Danny Novak
- Karen Carlson as Donna Novak
- Hans Conried as Abe Berlowitz
- George Barrow as Bill Swartz
- Michael Hershewe as Todd Novak
- Timothy Owen Waldrip as Casey Novak
- Andrea Smith as Jenny Novak
- John McIntire as Sam Whittier

== Episodes ==
| No. | Title | Directed by | Written by | Original release date |
|---|---|---|---|---|
| 1 | "Pilot" | Mel Damski | Ronald M. Cohen and Barbara Corday & Ken Hecht | April 26, 1981 |
| 2 | "Crossing Patterns" | Ray Danton | William Blinn | April 27, 1981 |
| 3 | "Casey's Romance" | Larry Elikann | Teleplay by : Max Jack & William Blinn; Story by : Max Jack | May 6, 1981 |
| 4 | "The Robbery" | Jerry Thorpe | Peter Lefcourt | June 3, 1981 |
| 5 | "Winners" | Jack Bender | Linda Elstad | June 10, 1981 |
| 6 | "A Blessing from Berlowitz" | N/A | William Blinn | Unaired |
| 7 | "The Bottom Line" | N/A | Peter Lefcourt | Unaired |
| 8 | "California Dreaming" | N/A | Ronald M. Cohen | Unaired |
