= List of Cagney & Lacey episodes =

The following is an episode list for the American television series Cagney & Lacey. A total of 125 episodes were produced, as well as five television movies (the 1981 pilot and four reunion movies from 1994 to 1996).

== Series overview ==
Season	Episodes	Originally released	
Season	Episodes	First released	Last released
Pilot		October 8, 1981	
1	6	March 25, 1982	June 28, 1982
2	22	October 25, 1982	May 9, 1983
3	7	March 19, 1984	May 14, 1984
4	22	October 15, 1984	April 8, 1985
5	24	September 30, 1985	May 26, 1986
6	22	September 29, 1986	March 30, 1987
7	22	September 21, 1987	May 16, 1988
TV movies (1994–96)		November 6, 1994	January 29, 1996

== Episodes ==
=== Pilot (1981) ===
- Loretta Swit played Det. Christine Cagney (TV movie pilot only)

Title	Directed by	Written by	Original release date
Cagney & Lacey	Ted Post	Story by : Barbara Avedon & Barbara Corday; Teleplay by : Barbara Avedon	October 8, 1981
Christine Cagney and Mary Beth Lacey, two female New York City policewomen working in a male-dominated police department, are promoted to detectives after uncovering a major heroin dealer, only to be patronized by being assigned as decoys on an undercover prostitute detail.

=== Season 1 (1982) ===
- Meg Foster played Det. Christine Cagney (season 1 only)

No. overall	No. in season	Title	Directed by	Written by	Original release date
1	1	"You Call This Plain Clothes?" "Bang, Bang, You're Dead"	Georg Stanford Brown	Barbara Avedon and Barbara Corday	March 25, 1982
A series of prostitute murders brings Cagney and Lacey to the rescue as undercover decoys.
2	2	"Pop Used to Work Chinatown"	Georg Stanford Brown	Brian McKay	April 1, 1982
A Chinatown robbery brings Cagney's father (Dick O'Neill) out of retirement to show his daughter and Lacey how an investigation should be conducted.
3	3	"Beyond the Golden Door"	Reza Badiyi	Marshall Goldberg	April 8, 1982
Cagney and Lacey go undercover in the garment industry to help an illegal alien from Guatemala track down her sister's murderers.
4	4	"Street Scene"	Ray Danton	Claudia Adams	April 18, 1982
An elderly man (George Petrie) is accused of murdering a member of a street gang, and Cagney and Lacey eventually prove his innocence through the victim's brother.
5	5	"Suffer the Children"	Ray Danton	Paul Ehrmann	April 25, 1982
In rescuing a four-year-old girl from a seventh floor window ledge, Cagney and Lacey discover she's a victim of parental abuse in a family whose older daughter has disappeared.
6	6	"Better Than Equal"	Ray Danton	Bud Freeman	June 28, 1982
Cagney and Lacey are assigned to protect Helen Granger (Julie Adams), an anti-feminist who is being harassed by an obscene phone caller bent on killing her.

=== Season 2 (1982–83) ===
- Sharon Gless played Det. (later Sgt.) Christine Cagney (seasons 2–7 and post-series TV movies)

No. overall	No. in season	Title	Directed by	Written by	Original release date
7	1	"Witness to An Incident"	Alexander Singer	Story by : Paul Ehrmann; Teleplay by : Paul Ehrmann and April Smith & Robert Crais & Jeffrey Lane & Frank Abatemarco	October 25, 1982
A young policeman's career hangs in the balance when Cagney and Lacey can't agree on the circumstances surrounding the fatal shooting of a civilian.
8	2	"One of Our Own"	Reza Badiyi	Robert Crais & April Smith	November 1, 1982
A case of mistaken identity leads to a police officer's shooting at a restaurant; meanwhile, Isbecki does all he can to keep Cagney and Lacey off the precinct's softball team.
9	3	"Beauty Burglars"	Ray Danton	Story by : Patt Shea & Robert K. Weiss; Teleplay by : Robert Crais & April Smith	November 8, 1982
Cagney and Lacey lead an investigation into a series of robberies at exclusive beauty salons committed by assailants posing as the police.
10	4	"High Steel"	Reza Badiyi	Rogers Turrentine	November 15, 1982
After a former co-worker falls to his death at a construction site, Harvey disagrees with the conclusion that his death is accidental and joins Lacey to investigate.
11	5	"Hotline"	Leo Penn	Frank Abatemarco	November 22, 1982
Cagney and Lacey investigate a series of stranglings involving women who worked for the telephone sex trade.
12	6	"Internal Affairs"	Alexander Singer	Story by : Joanne Pagliaro; Teleplay by : Aubrey Soloman & Steven Greenburg	November 29, 1982
Assigned to Internal Affairs, Cagney and Lacey reluctantly spy on their colleagues to uncover a deadly information leak in the 14th precinct.
13	7	"Mr. Lonelyhearts"	James Sheldon	Jeffrey Lane	December 6, 1982
When an elderly man comes looking for his missing wife, the case evolves into a major probe of bigamy and fraud; meanwhile, Cagney deals with an ardent suitor (Steven Keats).
14	8	"Conduct Unbecoming"	Alexander Singer	Rogers Turrentine	December 13, 1982
Cagney and Lacey's working with a third detective (Christopher Allport) to investigate illegal weaponry suffers from his overexposure in a gay magazine.
15	9	"I'll Be Home for Christmas"	Alexander Singer	Robert Crais	December 20, 1982
The detectives are looking forward to a quick getaway on Christmas Eve until a fake "Santa Claus" (Richard Masur) arrested for a charity fraud manages to escape from his cell; meanwhile, Det. Petrie's daughter is born.
16	10	"Recreational Use"	Alexander Singer	April Smith	December 27, 1982
A shady landlord attempting to turn his building co-op is a prime suspect in a murder, but the investigation becomes more complicated when Cagney and Lacey have to work with Sgt. Dory McKenna (Barry Primus), Cagney's boyfriend and a heavy cocaine user. Follow up of this episode is "Choices" (S03E07).
17	11	"Hopes and Dreams"	Peter Levin	Frank Abatemarco	January 10, 1983
Cagney and Lacey investigate a rash of burglaries committed while the occupants are away at funerals, with a handicapped girl among the victims.
18	12	"The Grandest Jewel Thief of Them All"	Victor Lobl	Michael Piller	January 17, 1983
Albert Grand (Ferdy Mayne), never convicted of all the hotel safe robberies the police are sure he committed, is now 70 years-old, released from jail, and back into his old habits. Follow up of this episode is "Two Grand" (S04E19).
19	13	"Affirmative Action"	Peter Levin	Jeffrey Lane	January 24, 1983
When the 14th precinct is assigned a talented, young female detective (Talia Balsam), Cagney and Lacey don't agree on whether she's qualified to be there or not.
20	14	"Open and Shut Case"	Nicholas Sgarro	Terry Louise Fisher and Steve Brown	January 31, 1983
Lt. Samuels hands Cagney and Lacey a seemingly open and shut case – a matter of a man being murdered in front of dozens of witnesses.
21	15	"Jane Doe #37"	Stan Lathan	Peter Lefcourt	February 14, 1983
When a Jane Doe homeless lady is murdered, Cagney vows to find her killer and her identity; meanwhile, Cagney and Lacey shoot a recruiting commercial for the NYPD.
22	16	"Date Rape"	John Tiffin Patterson	Story by : Terry Louise Fisher & Steve Brown; Teleplay by : Terry Louise Fisher	February 21, 1983
A rape victim (Kathleen Lloyd) suffers further when male detectives think her report is a vengeful lie, and the investigation also divides Cagney and Lacey.
23	17	"Burn Out"	Don Weis	Del Reisman & Chelsea Nickerson	March 7, 1983
Cagney poses as a nun as part of an investigation into missing drugs from a hospital; meanwhile, Lacey vanishes after a last-minute vacation cancellation.
24	18	"Chop Shop"	Bill Duke	Kevin Sullivan	March 14, 1983
Isbecki becomes a hostage after Cagney and Lacey fail to back him up properly; meanwhile, Petrie tries to sort out his confused feelings after accidentally shooting a black youth.
25	19	"Let Them Eat Pretzels"	Harry Harris	Peter Lefcourt	March 21, 1983
Cagney and Lacey try to find a way to arrest the son of a immunized diplomat who's using his nation's embassy to avoid justice after hitting a poor man with his car.
26	20	"The Gang's All Here"	Christian I. Nyby II	Lee Sheldon	March 28, 1983
The detectives from the 14th precinct are robbed of their guns, shields and possessions at a celebration for Petrie's promotion at a bar and set out to bring the perpetrators to justice before they become the laughing stock of the NYPD.
27	21	"A Cry for Help"	Barbara Peters	Terry Louise Fisher & Chris Abbott	May 2, 1983
A con man (Daniel Pilon) has to be let go because he had nothing on him when arrested, so Cagney and Lacey have to find a way to get him with the goods; meanwhile, a fellow police academy graduate of Lacey's (Greg Mullavey) is a wife-beater.
28	22	"The Informant"	Michael Vejar	Larry Konner & Ronnie Wenker-Konner	May 9, 1983
Cagney and Lacey have a high school drug case blow up in their faces when it turns out their teenage informant is a drug pusher himself.

=== Season 3 (1984) ===
No. overall	No. in season	Title	Directed by	Written by	Original release date
29	1	"Matinée"	Karen Arthur	Chris Abbott-Fish	March 19, 1984
A housewife from Cagney's hometown in Westchester County winds up dead in New York City, and the investigation offers a glimpse into Cagney's past.
30	2	"A Killer's Dozen"	John Tiffin Patterson	Peter Lefcourt	March 26, 1984
Cagney and Lacey are removed from an important homicide investigation when a patrolman's strike forces them back into uniform and onto the streets.
31	3	"Victimless Crime"	James Frawley	Peter Lefcourt	April 16, 1984
Cagney and Lacey investigate the death of a man at a pornographic filming site; meanwhile, Lacey dodges advances of a visiting French detective (Paul Freeman).
32	4	"The Bounty Hunter"	Bill Duke	Steve Brown	April 23, 1984
While looking for a criminal wanted for bail jumping, Cagney and Lacey encounter a bounty hunter named MacGruder (Brian Dennehy) who is also looking for the same person.
33	5	"Baby Broker"	John Tiffin Patterson	Terry Louise Fisher	April 30, 1984
An abandoned baby sets Cagney and Lacey on the trail of a baby broker, and Lacey decides to offer temporary housing for the deaf child.
34	6	"Partners"	Joel Oliansky	Patricia Green	May 7, 1984
Cagney lands in the hospital after being shot by a fleeing liquor store hold-up suspect; Lacey must try to find him with the help of her new temporary partner.
35	7	"Choices"	Karen Arthur	Terry Louise Fisher	May 14, 1984
After the key witness in the upcoming trial of a shady landlord dies, Cagney and Lacey must re-canvas his building in search of new witnesses before he gets set free; meanwhile, a false pregnancy forces Cagney to face her biological clock and realize that her options in life, as to when to marry and when to have a family, have diminished. Follow up of episode "Recreational Use" (S02E10).

=== Season 4 (1984–85) ===
No. overall	No. in season	Title	Directed by	Written by	Original release date
36	1	"Child Witness"	Karen Arthur	Deborah Arakelian	October 15, 1984
Cagney and Lacey are called by a school principal who has reason to believe that a six-year-old girl (Natalie Gregory) has been sexually abused; the child accuses her 22 year-old babysitter, who denies the allegation, and she later tells Cagney and Lacey (after coaching from her father) that she lied but they don't believe her.
37	2	"Heat"	Karen Arthur	Leo E. Arthur	October 22, 1984
While Cagney and Lacey investigate vandalism at a railroad yard, Lacey is abducted by a young armed thug (Michael Madsen) who keeps her locked in a railroad car.
38	3	"Insubordination"	John Tiffin Patterson	Peter Lefcourt	October 29, 1984
When Cagney and Lacey are assigned to a cocaine dealing case, they discover that their commanding officer is Dory McKenna, Cagney's ex-boyfriend and cocaine addict.
39	4	"Old Debts"	John Tiffin Patterson	Judy Merl & Paul Eric Myers	November 5, 1984
Cagney and Lacey are assigned to guard a cop killer on parole at a hotel until he can get new identity and be moved out of the city.
40	5	"Fathers and Daughters"	Karen Arthur	Steve Brown	November 12, 1984
Cagney and Lacey investigate a suicide which turns into a murder case involving a sordid relationship between the victim and his daughter (Dinah Manoff).
41	6	"Taxicab Murders"	Karen Arthur	Ronni Wenker-Konner	November 19, 1984
Cagney and Lacey, undercover driving cabs, are in search of a murderer who has been killing taxi cab drivers with a mountain-climbing pick.
42	7	"Unusual Occurrence"	Alexander Singer	Georgia Jeffries	November 26, 1984
Cagney finds a young, wild-eyed Puerto Rican boy swinging a baseball bat in an alley; after he ignores her commands to stop and keeps coming at her, Cagney shoots him.
43	8	"Thank God It's Monday"	Victor Lobl	Peter Lefcourt	December 3, 1984
An unsolved case nearing the statute of limitations sends Cagney and Lacey on a hurried search for the culprit during a weekend spent clearing up precinct paperwork.
44	9	"Hooked"	Karen Arthur	Patricia Green	December 10, 1984
When the man who sponsored Dory McKenna through the drug rehab program is arrested for cocaine possession sale, Dory tells Cagney it's a case of mistaken identity.
45	10	"Lady Luck"	Gabrielle Beaumont	Story by : Daniel S. Preniszni; Teleplay by : Lisa Seidman	December 17, 1984
Lacey thwarts a career woman's suicide attempt, but then feels a sense of responsibility for her life when the woman winds up murdered shortly thereafter.
46	11	"Out of Control"	Karen Arthur	Judy Merl & Paul Eric Myers	December 31, 1984
A man is shot to death during an attempted cat burglary; upon further investigation, Cagney and Lacey learn he was accidentally shot with the gun which he and his wife had purchased illegally in order to protect themselves from intruders.
47	12	"American Dream"	Sharron Miller	Story by : Steve Brown & Harvey Brenner; Teleplay by : Harvey Brenner	January 7, 1985
Cagney and Lacey suspect the owner of a trucking company of arson after a series of garment businesses are destroyed.
48	13	"Happily Ever After"	Alexander Singer	Terry Louise Fisher	January 14, 1985
A stray bullet leads Cagney and Lacey to the solution of 32,000 petty thefts committed by an ingenious credit department employee; meanwhile, Dory proposes to Cagney causing her to wonder what will happen if she doesn't accept.
49	14	"Rules of the Game"	Sharron Miller	Georgia Jeffries	January 28, 1985
Capt. Hennessey (Edward Winter), an officer in command, retains Cagney as his investigative partner while relegating Lacey to desk duty; his interest in Cagney becomes more personal than professional, and when she refuses to trade sexual favors for professional ones, he threatens her with a poor job evaluation.
50	15	"Stress"	Alexander Singer	Debra Frank & Scott Rubenstein	February 4, 1985
Cagney witnesses a stabbing and successfully apprehends the vicious perp, who then threatens her life.
51	16	"Who Says It's Fair?: Part 1"	Ray Danton	Story by : Barbara Avedon & Barbara Corday & Claudia Adams and Patricia Green; Teleplay by : Patricia Green	February 11, 1985
Cagney and Lacey respond to a call from a worried mother (Lynn Whitfield), who fears her young son (Bumper Robinson) is missing; meanwhile, Lacey may have breast cancer but is unwilling to go to a doctor.
52	17	"Who Says It's Fair?: Part 2"	Ray Danton	Patricia Green	February 18, 1985
Lacey must confront her own mortality with Harvey and the kids; the 14th precinct is psyching up for the Sergeant's exam, and Lacey is forced to miss it because of her operation.
53	18	"Lost and Found"	Al Waxman	Story by : Georgia Jeffries & Les Carter; Teleplay by : Georgia Jeffries	February 25, 1985
Cagney's yellow Corvette is stolen and the only clue is a graffiti signature; meanwhile, Lacey is recovering from surgery and tries to decide whether she should retire from the force.
54	19	"Two Grand"	Alexander Singer	Steve Johnson	March 4, 1985
Albert Grand, a jewel thief extraordinaire and Cagney's past nemesis, reappears on the scene when the clues from a major jewel theft lead to members of the 14th precinct. Follow up of episode "The Grandest Jewel Thief of Them All" (S02E12).
55	20	"Con Games"	Alexander Singer	Terry Louise Fisher & Steve Brown	March 11, 1985
Cagney ignores both advice and threats as she presses charges of sexual harassment against Capt. Hennessey; meanwhile, Lacey looks into fraud against the elderly.
56	21	"Violation"	Allen Baron	Les Carter	March 18, 1985
Cagney and Lacey investigate when a teenager, who is accidentally sent to a violent prison for shoplifting, is brutally assaulted and his parents file a $7 million lawsuit.
57	22	"Organized Crime"	Ralph S. Singleton	Terry Louise Fisher & Steve Brown	April 8, 1985
Cagney and Lacey investigate a rash of poorbox robberies in the city's Catholic churches and a murdered nun; meanwhile, Cagney gets the promotion to Sergeant.

=== Season 5 (1985–86) ===
No. overall	No. in season	Title	Directed by	Written by	Original release date
58	1	"On the Street"	Alexander Singer	Cynthia Darnell	September 30, 1985
Cagney and Lacey try to convince a teenage runaway (Kristy Swanson), who's shunned her family's wealth and privilege for a life on the streets, to help them convict her pimp.
59	2	"Ordinary Hero"	Reza Badiyi	Robert Eisele	October 7, 1985
Cagney and Lacey feel for the key witness in an upcoming trial – an undocumented worker whose reward for his help will be deportation upon the trial's conclusion.
60	3	"The Psychic"	Ray Danton	Debra Frank & Scott Rubenstein	October 21, 1985
Cagney doubts the abilities of a psychic (Elizabeth Ashley) who's been hired to locate a missing woman by her family.
61	4	"Lottery"	James Frawley	Steve Johnson	October 28, 1985
When a lottery jackpot has one more claimant than there should be, Cagney and Lacey try to find out who's got the counterfeit ticket.
62	5	"Entrapment"	Al Waxman	Steve Johnson	November 4, 1985
Lacey faces an ethical dilemma when she has to choose between supporting Cagney's claims against a known drug dealer, or admitting she knows nothing about it.
63	6	"The Clinic"	Alexander Singer	Judy Merl & Paul Eric Myers	November 11, 1985
When a firebomb at an abortion clinic kills a patient, it ignites a debate over whether the death of a fetus constitutes a second murder.
64	7	"Mothers & Sons"	Ray Danton	Frank South	November 25, 1985
A mother's alibi for her son stands in the way of criminal charges, despite other compelling evidence; meanwhile, Lacey's son gets on the wrong side of the law himself.
65	8	"Filial Duty"	Sharron Miller	Richard Gollance	December 2, 1985
Years of drinking finally put Cagney's father into the hospital; meanwhile, Lacey's pregnancy forces her to make changes to her work routine.
66	9	"Old Ghosts"	Georg Stanford Brown	Georgia Jeffries	December 9, 1985
Cagney is accused of being a coward when a robbery suspect eludes her in a chase; meanwhile, her brother Brian (David Ackroyd) comes from California to check on their father.
67	10	"Power"	James Frawley	Patricia Green	December 16, 1985
Cagney gets to fill in for Lt. Samuels as watch commander, but dislikes that one of her first assignments is to force Lacey to go on maternity leave.
68	11	"Play It Again, Santa"	Charlotte Brown	Judy Merl & Paul Eric Myers	December 23, 1985
Cagney and Det. Newman (Dan Shor) work a case involving music rights issues.
69	12	"The Rapist"	James Frawley	Judy Merl & Paul Eric Myers	January 6, 1986
Sara Jones (Julie Fulton), Lacey's energetic replacement, turns vigilante when she angers over the time it's taking to get to arrest a suspected rapist.
70	13	"Act of Conscience"	Jan Eliasberg	Frederick Rappaport	January 13, 1986
The new replacement for Lacey comes with a history the 14th precinct doesn't like – he broke the blue wall of silence when other police were taking bribes.
71	14	"DWI"	Al Waxman	Les Carter & Susan Sisko	January 20, 1986
While running the night shift, a case of DWI begins to make Cagney confront her own demons with the bottle.
72	15	"The Gimp"	Sharron Miller	Story by : Norm Chandler Fox; Teleplay by : Cynthia Darnell	January 27, 1986
An advocate for the handicapped demands something be done about a rash of robberies against the disabled.
73	16	"Family Connections"	James Frawley	Georgia Jeffries	February 10, 1986
Cagney races to get a labouring Lacey to the hospital before the baby comes out; meanwhile, she also has to deal with her father's new girlfriend.
74	17	"Post Partum"	Georg Stanford Brown	Liz Coe & Steve Brown	February 17, 1986
Cagney investigates a West Point cadet accused of cocaine possession; meanwhile, Lacey receives a visit from her father (Richard Bradford), who abandoned her 30 years ago.
75	18	"The Man Who Shot Trotsky"	Alexander Singer	Peter Lefcourt & Kathryn Ford	March 3, 1986
With Lacey back from maternity leave, she and Cagney again go after drug dealer Mansfield (John Harkins) with the help of a young Hispanic informant.
76	19	"Exit Stage Centre"	James Frawley	Story by : Steve Johnson & Jeff Nelson; Teleplay by : Steve Johnson	March 10, 1986
The apparent suicide of a stage actress starts to look like murder when Cagney and Lacey discover everyone involved in the play seems to have a motive.
77	20	"Capitalism"	Alexander Singer	Frederick Rappaport	April 7, 1986
When a lawyer who has made a living helping his fellow Cambodians winds up murdered, Cagney and Lacey learn he may have been profiting from misfortunes too much.
78	21	"Extradition"	Charles S. Dubin	Story by : Bob Rosenfarb; Teleplay by : Kathryn Ford	May 5, 1986
Cagney and Lacey go to California to bring back a defendant who skipped on his bail; meanwhile, Cagney visits her brother Brian and his family for the first time in twelve years.
79	22	"A Safe Place"	Alexander Singer	Georgia Jeffries	May 12, 1986
Cagney and Lacey race against time to catch a thief, whose latest haul included plutonium, before his radiation sickness becomes terminal.
80	23	"Model Citizen"	Jeffrey Hayden	Hannah Louise Shearer and Patricia Green	May 19, 1986
To find the murderer of a labour leader, Cagney and Lacey must first find out why anyone would want the apparently squeaky-clean man dead.
81	24	"Parting Shots"	Georg Stanford Brown	Liz Coe	May 26, 1986
The 14th precinct suffers the loss of one of their own, as Cagney and Lacey work to find out who shot and killed Det. Newman.

=== Season 6 (1986–87) ===
No. overall	No. in season	Title	Directed by	Written by	Original release date
82	1	"Schedule One"	Alexander Singer	Robert Eisele	September 29, 1986
A suspect has an intriguing deal for leniency – he'll reveal who in the precinct is involved with heroin possession; meanwhile, the Laceys move into a new home.
83	2	"Culture Clash"	Ray Danton	Frank South	October 6, 1986
When a girl who wants to break away from her traditionally Islamic upbringing is murdered, Cagney and Lacey must confront her family.
84	3	"Sorry, Right Number"	Alexander Singer	Bill Taub	October 20, 1986
A sweltering day leads to an elevator failure with Lacey and a claustrophobic Isbecki trapped inside.
85	4	"Disenfranchised (aka Incest)"	James Frawley	Daniel Freudenberger	October 27, 1986
After a girl accuses her father of molesting her younger sister, Cagney and Lacey are forced to take action to keep the girls safe.
86	5	"Role Call"	James Frawley	Marcey Vosburg and Sandy Sprung	November 3, 1986
The female star (Shannon Tweed) of a TV police series visits the 14th precinct and tags along with Cagney and Lacey to learn about the work of real-life detectives.
87	6	"The Zealot"	Francine Parker	Kathryn Ford	November 17, 1986
An attorney who had been building a case against child exploitation for years is brutally murdered and pornographers come under suspicion.
88	7	"The Marathon"	Ralph S. Singleton	Josef Anderson	November 24, 1986
Cagney and Lacey are charged with protecting a white South African runner in town for the New York City Marathon.
89	8	"Rites of Passage"	Reza Badiyi	Georgia Jeffries	December 1, 1986
When hazing is suspected to have caused a girl to fall off a roof while rushing a sorority, the sisters close ranks, impeding the investigation.
90	9	"Revenge"	Reza Badiyi	Frederick Rappaport	December 8, 1986
Petrie falls under suspicion when someone he was squabbling with is murdered; Cagney finds out a reporter she's dating isn't just interested in her romantically.
91	10	"To Thine Own Self Be True (aka The Rapist: Part 2)"	Helaine Head	Patricia Green	December 15, 1986
When Sara Jones (one of Lacey's maternity replacements) goes to trial for her act of vigilante justice against a rapist, Cagney refuses to lie to save her.
92	11	"Cost of Living"	Al Waxman	Frank South and Joe Viola	January 12, 1987
When drug dealer Mansfield goes on trial, he surprises everyone by hiring David Keeler (Stephen Macht) to represent him, especially upsetting Cagney.
93	12	"Waste Deep"	Claudia Weill	Michael Berlin and Eric Estrin	January 19, 1987
An environmental champion (Didi Conn) begs Cagney and Lacey to investigate a toy manufacturer's unlawful disposal of toxic wastes.
94	13	"Favors"	Al Waxman	Frederick Rappaport	January 26, 1987
Cagney and Lacey investigate a judge (Robert Cornthwaite) who is a friend of Cagney's father; Lacey is surprised at the results of her performance review from Cagney.
95	14	"Ahead of the Game"	Joel Rosenzweig	Allison Hock	February 2, 1987
Lacey has egg on her face when the Laceys' home is robbed, and it is revealed she doesn't follow the same home safeguarding tips she gives to civilians.
96	15	"Easy Does It"	Helaine Head	Les Carter and Susan Sisko	February 9, 1987
Cagney and Lacey, undercover as alcoholics, investigate a string of robberies at AA meetings; meanwhile, at a co-dependents' meeting, Cagney is surprised to see Donna (Carole Cook), her father's girlfriend.
97	16	"To Sir, With Love"	Ray Danton	Sandy Sprung and Marcy Vosburgh	February 16, 1987
Cagney and Lacey get placed in charge of planning a banquet to award Lt. Samuels with the Distinguished Service Award.
98	17	"Divine Couriers"	Sharron Miller	Frederick Rappaport	February 23, 1987
Cagney and Lacey try to bring down a scam artist (Lois Nettleton) who promises to get messages to the departed by giving them to the terminally ill.
99	18	"Right to Remain Silent"	Sharron Miller	David Abramowitz	March 9, 1987
Cagney and Lacey question if a deaf girl could have committed the murder of which she's accused; David Keeler wants Cagney to forgive him for representing Mansfield.
100	19	"Special Treatment"	Jackie Cooper	Allison Hock	March 16, 1987
Lacey is arrested at a nuclear weapons protest, finding herself in the custody of Queens' Det. Dupnick (Dan Lauria).
101	20	"Happiness is a Warm Gun"	James Frawley	Joe Viola	March 23, 1987
After Lacey is shot, but saved by a bulletproof vest, she and Cagney deal with the stress by seeing the police psychiatrist.
102	21	"Turn, Turn, Turn: Part 1"	Sharron Miller	Georgia Jeffries	May 4, 1987
After years of drinking finally cost Charlie Cagney his life, Cagney and her brother Brian must deal with the aftermath.
103	22	"Turn, Turn, Turn: Part 2"	Sharron Miller	Shelley List and Jonathan Estrin	May 11, 1987
As Cagney turns to the bottle herself to deal with her father's death, Lacey tries to save her by getting her back to AA.

=== Season 7 (1987–88) ===
No. overall	No. in season	Title	Directed by	Written by	Original release date
104	1	"No Vacancy"	James Frawley	Eric Blakeney and Gene Miller	September 21, 1987
Cagney and Lacey's guarding of a mentally ill witness (Joe Regalbuto) is complicated by his refusal to take his medication.
105	2	"The City is Burning"	Helaine Head	Samm-Art Williams	September 28, 1987
When Det. Corassa's gun is linked to the slaying of a black youth in a white section of town, the black community suspects a cover-up.
106	3	"Loves Me Not"	Jonathan Estrin	Frank South	October 5, 1987
David Keeler defends Lacey after the community demands a Civilian Review Board investigate her role in a neighborhood dispute; Det. Petrie is promoted to Sergeant.
107	4	"Different Drummer"	Sharron Miller	Allison Hock	October 19, 1987
An eccentric, older woman (Jeanette Nolan) who claims she's a witch is getting in the way of a lucrative real estate deal.
108	5	"You've Come a Long Way, Baby"	Joel Rosenzweig	Frederick Rappaport	October 26, 1987
Cagney and Lacey go undercover on street corners to investigate a rash of middle-aged prostitute murders.
109	6	"Video Verité"	Jackie Cooper	Eric Estrin and Michael Berlin	November 9, 1987
A missing music video may be linked to drugs; Cagney's niece Bridget (Amanda Wyss) visits with aspirations of becoming an actress in New York City.
110	7	"Greed"	Nessa Hyams	Douglas Steinberg	November 16, 1987
Cagney and Lacey go undercover as game show contestants to investigate a rigging accusation.
111	8	"Secrets"	Reza Badiyi	Joe Viola	November 23, 1987
Cagney finally gets to work on the Major Task Force and immediately is faced with finding out who the turncoat is in their midst.
112	9	"Don't I Know You?"	Sharron Miller	Kathryn Ford	January 5, 1988
When Cagney claims to have been date-raped by a well-respected businessman (Jack Bannon), he claims the sex was consensual and she must prove that it actually happened.
113	10	"Old Flames"	Reza Badiyi	Robert Bielak	January 12, 1988
Cagney and Lacey investigate the apparent suicide of an elderly man in a retirement home and the disappearance of his wife; meanwhile, Harvey Lacey Jr. stuns his parents on his 18th birthday by announcing he's enlisting with the Marines.
114	11	"Trading Places"	James Frawley	Wayne Powers and Donna Dottley Powers	January 19, 1988
Cagney is disappointed when she's passed over to fill in during Lt. Samuels' vacation; Harvey assists in a case involving kickbacks at a construction site.
115	12	"Shadow of a Doubt"	Jackie Cooper	Larry and Paul Barber	January 26, 1988
Cagney and Lacey pose as factory workers to expose an employee's theft of microchips but the undercover operation is jeopardized when Cagney fails the company's random drug test.
116	13	"Hello Goodbye"	Janet Davidson	P.K. Knelman	February 2, 1988
A rash of bogus 911 calls leads Lacey to a pair of abused children; meanwhile, David Keeler proposes marriage to Cagney.
117	14	"School Daze"	Jackie Cooper	Allison Hock	February 16, 1988
Cagney and Lacey have very different attitudes at a mandatory refresher course in interrogation procedures for their precinct at the police academy.
118	15	"Land of the Free"	Stephen Macht	Sharon Elizabeth Doyle	February 23, 1988
When a refugee from El Salvador is slain, different people give wildly different opinions of the life he led to Cagney and Lacey during their investigation.
119	16	"A Class Act"	James Frawley	Wayne Powers and Donna Dottley Powers	March 15, 1988
Cagney and Lacey pose as art collectors to solve the theft of a painter's (Peter Boyle) valued work.
120	17	"Button, Button"	Al Waxman	Michelle Ashford	March 22, 1988
The girlfriend of a murdered federal witness asks for help finding his killer; meanwhile, one of Alice Lacey's classmates has AIDS.
121	18	"Amends"	Michael Caffey	Larry and Paul Barber	March 29, 1988
In a case of friendly fire, an officer is accidentally shot by Thornton (James Stephens); meanwhile, Cagney makes amends with Donna while sponsoring a new AA member.
122	19	"Friendly Smoke"	Reza Badiyi	Shelley List and Jonathan Estrin	April 5, 1988
Cagney's date-rape case against Brad Potter goes to trial; meanwhile, Harvey Lacey Jr. disappears from his Marine training.
123	20	"Yup"	Nancy Malone	Sharon Elizabeth Doyle	May 2, 1988
A Wall Street success with friends high on the police command chain is robbed, creating additional pressure to solve the case quickly.
124	21	"A Fair Shake: Part 1"	Reza Badiyi	Barney Rosenzweig	May 9, 1988
A plea bargain over a missing $100,000 from a bank sends Cagney and Lacey upstate in search of its president and of another $100 million.
125	22	"A Fair Shake: Part 2"	Reza Badiyi	Max Jack	May 16, 1988
Cagney and Lacey wrap up the investigation into the stolen $100 million by narrowly escaping a shootout and they get offered a promotion to Major Case Squad at its conclusion.

=== TV movies (1994–96) ===
Title	Directed by	Written by	Original release date
Cagney & Lacey: The Return	James Frawley	Terry Louise Fisher and Steve Brown	November 6, 1994
Mary Beth Lacey has retired from the police force and Christine Cagney-Burton is now a lieutenant working as a senior investigator for the District Attorney's office and married to lawyer James Burton (James Naughton); the women have lost touch over the years, but circumstances bring them back together again when they search for a cache of missing firearms.
Cagney & Lacey: Together Again	Reza Badiyi	Terry Louise Fisher and Steve Brown	May 2, 1995
Cagney and Lacey re-team to solve the murder of a homeless transient who had been terrorizing the residents of a posh apartment building with screaming threats, insults and physical intimidation; although the cops think the culprit is another street person, Cagney and Lacey believe the real killer is one of the tenants; meanwhile, Cagney's divorce is finalized and she ends up single again.
Cagney & Lacey: The View Through the Glass Ceiling	John Patterson	Michele Gallery	October 25, 1995
Cagney and Lacey must investigate a local precinct when a murder leads to suspicion of police corruption; when the findings of the DA's police corruption investigation turn out to be useful to Cagney's political ambitions, she makes a choice that will have a lasting impact on her life, Lacey's and the twenty-year friendship between them; meanwhile, Lacey has to deal with the return of her estranged, aging father Martin (Richard Bradford) who is in the hospital.
Cagney & Lacey: True Convictions	Lynne Littman	Michele Gallery	January 29, 1996
After the girlfriend of a murder victim from her building commits suicide, Cagney gets romantically involved with the girl's still-married father (Michael Moriarty); Cagney and Lacey are assigned to work New York's first capital murder case in a decade and everyone seems to have an opinion on capital punishment.
