= Cagney & Lacey =

American police procedural television series (1982–1988)

- Genre: Police crime drama; Buddy cop; Mystery; Thriller
- Created by: Barbara Avedon; Barbara Corday
- Starring: Tyne Daly; Loretta Swit; Meg Foster; Sharon Gless; Al Waxman; John Karlen; Carl Lumbly; Martin Kove; Sidney Clute; Barry Primus; Harvey Atkin; Dan Shor; Paul Mantee; Robert Hegyes
- Theme music composer: Bill Conti
- Composer: Dana Kaproff
- Country of origin: United States
- Original language: English
- No. of seasons: 7
- No. of episodes: 125 (+ pilot and 4 TV movies) (list of episodes)

Production
- Executive producer: Barney Rosenzweig
- Producers: Steve Brown; Terry Louise Fisher; Georgia Jeffries; Peter Lefcourt; Richard M. Rosenbloom; Harry R. Sherman; Ralph S. Singleton; April Smith; Joseph Stern
- Camera setup: Single-camera
- Running time: 48–49 minutes
- Production companies: Mace Neufeld Productions; Filmways Television (1982; season 1); Orion Television (1982–1988; seasons 2–7)

Original release
- Network: CBS
- Release: March 25, 1982 – May 16, 1988

Cagney & Lacey is an American police procedural drama television series that aired on the CBS television network for seven seasons from March 25, 1982, to May 16, 1988. The show is about two New York City police detectives who lead very different lives: Christine Cagney (Sharon Gless) is a career-minded single woman, while Mary Beth Lacey (Tyne Daly) is a married working mother. The series is set in a fictionalized version of Manhattan's 14th Precinct (known as "Midtown South").

The pilot movie had Loretta Swit in the role of Cagney, while the first six episodes had Meg Foster in the role. When the show was revived for a full-season run, Gless took over the role and remained in the part for the rest of the show's run and later television movies. Each year during that time, one of the two lead actresses won the Emmy for Best Lead Actress in a Drama (four wins for Daly in 1983, 1984, 1985 and 1988; and two wins for Gless in 1986 and 1987), a winning streak matched only once since in any major category by a show. John Karlen also won the Emmy for Best Supporting Actor in a Drama in 1986 for his role as Harvey Lacey Sr., and the Cagney & Lacey series itself won the Emmy for Outstanding Drama in 1985 and 1986.

== Development ==
Producer Barney Rosenzweig was influenced by the feminist movement through his then-girlfriend Barbara Corday, who recommended to him Molly Haskell's book From Reverence to Rape which analyses depictions of women in film. Haskell's book claimed there had never been a female buddy film, and Rosenzweig sought to make one, a comedy initially titled Newman & Redford (before changing the title for legal reasons). Corday and Barbara Avedon wrote the script. No studio wanted to make the film, so Corday considered taking it to television. Rosenzweig took the script, removed the main plot (leaving only the character development), and took it to all networks, but only CBS was interested.

== Cast ==
Actress Loretta Swit played the role of Christine Cagney in the original television movie (October 1981), but was forced to decline the role in the series when the producers of M*A*S*H refused to let her out of her contract. When the movie was picked up as a series, first airing with six episodes as a midseason replacement in the spring of 1982, Meg Foster portrayed the character. When the show was picked up for a regular season in 1982, Foster was replaced with Sharon Gless because CBS deemed Foster too aggressive and too likely to be perceived as a lesbian by the viewers.

CBS executives hoped Gless would portray Cagney as more feminine and attempted to pressure the producers to remake Christine into a more "high-class", snobbish woman from wealthy parents. Ironically, Gless' casting increased the lesbian viewership.

The pilot had portrayed Cagney as an ex-glamour model. Barney Rosenzweig and Barbara Corday initially refused to change Cagney from a tough, witty, working-class woman. Shortly into Gless's tenure on the program, Rosenzweig and Corday compromised with network leadership. They further developed Cagney's background, explaining gradually in a loose storyline that she may have been born to a somewhat well-to-do professional mother, Maureen, who had a relationship with police officer Charles Cagney (Dick O'Neill), who came from working-class roots. They separated soon after Christine and her brother Brian (David Ackroyd) were born. She was partially raised in an uptown Westchester world, which she appreciated; however, the trappings of the upper-middle social strata sometimes drove her to miss her father's lifestyle, and she and her father therefore established a special bond.

Cagney was a bit quieter and more reserved than her more vivacious and talkative partner Lacey, but could still relate to the world, often with attitudes that could be shared by many.

Character	Portrayed by	Series								TV Movies			
Character	Portrayed by	Pilot	1	2	3	4	5	6	7	1	2	3	4
Detective Mary Beth Lacey	Tyne Daly	Main	Main	Main	Main	Main	Main	Main	Main	Starring	Starring	Starring	Starring
Detective/Sergeant Christine Cagney	Sharon Gless (Note: Played by Loretta Swit in the pilot movie and Meg Foster in season 1.)	Main	Main	Main	Main	Main	Main	Main	Main	Starring	Starring	Starring	Starring
Lieutenant Albert Samuels	Al Waxman	Main	Main	Main	Main	Main	Main	Main	Main	Supporting			
Harvey Lacey, Sr.	John Karlen (Note: Played by Ronald Hunter in the pilot movie.)	Main	Main	Main	Main	Main	Main	Main	Main	Starring	Starring	Starring	Starring
Detective/Sergeant Marcus Petrie	Carl Lumbly	Recurring	Main (Note: Credited through the third episode of season seven.)	Main	Main	Main	Main	Main	Main	Supporting			
Detective Victor Isbecki	Martin Kove (Note: Played by Jefferson Mappin in the pilot movie.)	Recurring	Recurring	Main	Main	Main	Main	Main	Main	Supporting			
Detective Paul LaGuardia	Sidney Clute		Recurring	Main	Main	Main	Main (Note: Clute passed away and did not appear in seasons five through seven, although he was still credited as a tribute to the actor.)	Main	Main				
Sergeant Dory McKenna	Barry Primus			Guest		Main (Note: Primus is only credited among the main cast in the episodes in which he appears.)							
Desk Sergeant Ronald Coleman	Harvey Atkin	Recurring	Recurring	Recurring	Recurring	Recurring	Main	Main	Main				
Detective Jonah Newman	Dan Shor						Main (Note: Shor is credited as a main cast member for episode four, then six onwards.)						
Detective Manny Esposito	Robert Hegyes							Main (Note: Hegyes is credited as a main cast member for episode three of season six, then five onwards.)	Main	Supporting			
Mrs. Friedlander	Joan Copeland	Main											
Female Hudson	Yvette Hawkins	Main											
James Burton	James Naughton									Starring	Starring		
D.A. Feldberg	David Paymer									Starring	Starring		
Deborah Nelson	Susan Anspach									Starring			
Douglas Trayne	Chip Zien											Starring	Starring
Dan Broadbent	George Coe											Starring	
Gigi Cardenas	Lynne Thigpen											Starring	
Angela Lum	Sandra Oh											Starring	
Tom Cornell	Mark Melymick											Starring	
Martin Zibiski	Richard Bradford						Guest		Guest			Starring	
Matthew Wylie	Michael Moriarty												Starring
Jan Kaplovitz	Sam Coppola												Starring
Mike Foy	Beau Starr			Guest (Note: Starr was credited for a guest role as a different character during season two.)									Starring
Lee Moyer	Darryl Theirse												Starring
Darcy Wylie	Natalie Radford												Starring

== Synopsis ==
Season	Episodes	Originally released	
Season	Episodes	First released	Last released
Pilot		October 8, 1981	
1	6	March 25, 1982	June 28, 1982
2	22	October 25, 1982	May 9, 1983
3	7	March 19, 1984	May 14, 1984
4	22	October 15, 1984	April 8, 1985
5	24	September 30, 1985	May 26, 1986
6	22	September 29, 1986	March 30, 1987
7	22	September 21, 1987	May 16, 1988
TV movies (1994–96)		November 6, 1994	January 29, 1996

Al Waxman co-starred as Cagney and Lacey's good-natured and sometimes blustery supervisor, Lt. Bert Samuels. Carl Lumbly and Martin Kove played fellow detectives Marcus Petrie and Victor Isbecki. Sidney Clute played veteran detective Paul LaGuardia. John Karlen co-starred as Mary Beth's husband, Harvey Lacey, and Tony La Torre and Troy Slaten played their sons Harvey Lacey Jr. and Michael Lacey. Harvey Atkin played desk sergeant Ronald Coleman. Jason Bernard had the recurring role of Deputy Inspector Marquette during the first two seasons. When the show was brought back in March 1984, Marquette had been replaced by Dep. Inspector Knelman (Michael Fairman), who lasted the rest of the series. In the fourth season, Christine entered a relationship with Sgt. Dory McKenna (Barry Primus), who battled drug addiction. After a tumultuous courtship, Christine left him and soon after took up with a more stable suitor, attorney David Keeler (Stephen Macht).

On October 2, 1985, Clute died of cancer at age 69. He had completed filming a few episodes of the 1985–86 season. Det. LaGuardia's disappearance from the show was explained by saying he had retired from the 14th Precinct and moved to New Jersey with a new female companion less than half his age. To honor Clute, the producers kept his name in the opening credits for the rest of the series.

LaGuardia was replaced in the fifth season with Det. Jonah Newman (Dan Shor), a boyish ingenu with an elevated sense of himself. Newman, while popular with the guys, was not above stepping on anyone in order to get the coveted promotion of Detective Second Grade. As a result, Chris and Mary Beth had a strained relationship with him. Newman developed a crush on Chris but she never knew. Eventually, Newman was partnered with veteran Al Corassa (Paul Mantee), who became a regular midway through season five (Mantee had made three guest appearances in late 1985, in which his character's name was Det. Thomas in the first two episodes, and Corassa in the third) and took up the role of experienced cop that LaGuardia had vacated. Their partnership met a sad end in May 1986, when Newman was killed by a random gunshot outside of the local district court, just after receiving his promotion to Second Grade.

The beginning of the sixth season saw the arrival of Manny Esposito (Robert Hegyes), a young, street-savvy detective who became Corassa's new partner. There was quite a clash between the two, as Esposito's freewheeling lifestyle (represented by his casual dress on the job, the desire to make a quick buck, and three ex-wives) put him in contrast with Corassa, the older, more conservative family man with a heightened sense of professionalism. Supporting characters added to the precinct at this time were rookie Officer Tom Basil (Barry Laws) and Officer Beverley Faverty (Beverley Faverty). The following year, Petrie was promoted to sergeant and then departed the 14th Precinct (Carl Lumbly had decided to leave the series). In his place, singer Merry Clayton joined the cast as Verna Dee Jordan, the first new female detective at the precinct since the additions of Cagney and Lacey. Jordan had joined law enforcement in middle age to better herself, after having been a single mother raising four children (now grown) on welfare.

Dick O'Neill played a recurring role as Cagney's alcoholic father, Charlie Cagney, a former NYPD officer who regaled her with stories of the old days; Christine later fought alcoholism as well. In the fourth season, Mary Beth becomes pregnant; she and Harvey welcome in a baby daughter, Alice Christine, in the fall of 1985. Alice Lacey was played by alternating twins Dana & Paige Bardolph from 1985 to 1987, with toddler Michelle Sepe taking over for the seventh season.

== Cancellation and return ==
Cagney & Lacey premiered in March 1982 with high hopes from the industry, in the wake of the TV movie. Reviews of the series, however, with Meg Foster in place of Loretta Swit, were mixed. Critics praised the level of storytelling, but put emphasis on the aggressiveness that both Daly and Foster expressed with their characters. As soon as the six-episode order was finished in late April, CBS canceled the program due to poor ratings. Executive producer Barney Rosenzweig was determined to reverse the network's decision. Sharon Gless had been initially unavailable for the movie and series, which were produced by Orion, because of her long-running contract to Universal Television (she was the last actress ever to be signed to a long-term contract with a studio, in 1972). Gless was even actively utilizing her Universal contract at the time the series went into production, having taken over as female lead (from Lynn Redgrave who left the series in a dispute with producers) on the CBS sitcom House Calls. Rumors were also rampant that House Calls was getting the axe that spring.

Before the unveiling of that year's network upfronts, a CBS executive told the press that the network had cancelled Cagney & Lacey because of low ratings but also the jarringly tough nature of the female leads, saying, "We've perceived them as dykes". This remark drew wide protest, and put Rosenzweig into high gear in his dealings with CBS. The cancellation of House Calls was announced among insider circles just before upfronts, and Rosenzweig pressured CBS executives to relaunch Cagney & Lacey in the fall with Gless replacing Foster. Gless met with Cagney & Lacey producers again to consider the role, but while always having taken to the character, had doubts about joining for the fall of 1982 because, after House Calls, she "didn't want to make a career of replacing actresses".

Ratings were still low during the first year Daly and Gless co-starred on the series. Cagney & Lacey was canceled by CBS a second time in May 1983, but after almost a year of decreased buzz about the show, an ever-larger public outcry exploded upon the series's axing. Fans of the show, organized by Rosenzweig, staged a letter-writing campaign. At the same time, CBS switched its time slot for what was to have been its final three months on the air during summer reruns. This relocation resulted in the ratings suddenly rising. The viewer protest, coupled with the post-cancellation improvement in the Nielsens and the Emmy nomination that year (which Tyne Daly won in September), resulted in success for the public. That fall, CBS announced the return of Cagney & Lacey as a mid-season entry. The network would have wanted to return it sooner, but not long after the second cancelation came to pass, the sets at Orion had already been destroyed, and the cast had been let out of their contracts. One cast member, Tony La Torre, had already joined another series, the ABC sitcom 9 to 5. When nearly all of the Cagney & Lacey cast received new contracts in late 1983, La Torre returned as well after 9 to 5 was canceled by ABC just weeks into the 1983–84 season. Cagney & Lacey went back into production in January 1984 and returned to air on March 19 of that year.

TV Guide celebrated the show's return with the cover reading "Welcome Back, Cagney & Lacey – You want them! You've got them!". The show finished in the top 10 for the 1983–84 season, and went on to earn 36 Emmy Award nominations and 14 wins throughout its run until 1988, including six nominations each for stars Daly and Gless: four wins for Daly and two for Gless. The series itself won two consecutive Emmy Awards for Best Drama Series in 1985 and 1986. The show's ratings leveled out to where it hovered around 30th place in the Nielsens during seasons four to six, a period where many state the show to have been in its creative peak.

The series continued to air Monday nights at 10:00 p.m. EST/9:00 p.m. CST until the middle of the 1987–88 season, holding its own against ABC's Monday Night Football and NBC Monday Night at the Movies. Midway through its seventh season, Cagney & Lacey was moved to Tuesdays at 10:00 p.m. EST/9:00 p.m. CST, where it began to compete against Thirtysomething (ABC) and Crime Story (NBC). Cagney & Lacey lost viewers to the first-year critical success of thirtysomething, which, despite being the time slot winner, only ranked No. 45 overall. CBS' reason for relocating Cagney & Lacey was because it was believed that its Monday slot would further build an audience for Wiseguy, another new critical hit of the season that had average ratings at best. By the end of the season, Cagney & Lacey was left at 53rd place, and the 20-point drop from the previous season was enough for CBS to have doubts about renewing the show. With the final episode of the seventh season ending on a cliffhanger, CBS was considering bringing the show back, but when May 1988 upfronts were released, Cagney & Lacey's cancellation was confirmed. For the summer of 1988, the series moved one last time, not back to its familiar Monday time slot, but to Thursdays at 10 pm EST/9 CST. The series garnered considerable popularity internationally. It was originally shown in the UK on BBC1, where it regularly made the top 10.

== Theme music ==
The main titles for the first season are accompanied by the theme song "Ain't That the Way" by Michael Stull, sung by Marie Cain, and shows the two lead characters being promoted to plainclothes detectives and later disguised as prostitutes. This was replaced the following season by an instrumental theme composed by Bill Conti set to a collage of action and comical scenes featuring the characters from the series.

== Reception ==
=== Nielsen ratings ===
Season	Rank	Rating
1) 1981–1982	#64	N/A
2) 1982–1983	#55	N/A
3) 1983–1984	#10	20.9
4) 1984–1985	#28	16.9
5) 1985–1986	#31	16.7
6) 1986–1987	#37	15.1
7) 1987–1988	#52	13.0

=== Awards and nominations ===
==== Primetime Emmy Awards ====
- 1983 Nomination for Outstanding Drama Series
- 1983 Award for Outstanding Lead Actress in a Drama Series (Tyne Daly)
- 1983 Nomination for Outstanding Lead Actress in a Drama Series (Sharon Gless)
- 1984 Nomination for Outstanding Drama Series
- 1984 Award for Outstanding Lead Actress in a Drama Series (Tyne Daly)
- 1984 Nomination for Outstanding Lead Actress in a Drama Series (Sharon Gless)
- 1985 Award for Outstanding Drama Series
- 1985 Award for Outstanding Lead Actress in a Drama Series (Tyne Daly)
- 1985 Award for Outstanding Directing in a Drama Series (Karen Arthur)
- 1985 Nomination for Outstanding Lead Actress in a Drama Series (Sharon Gless)
- 1985 Nomination for Outstanding Supporting Actor in a Drama Series (John Karlen)
- 1986 Award for Outstanding Drama Series
- 1986 Nomination for Outstanding Lead Actress in a Drama Series (Tyne Daly)
- 1986 Award for Outstanding Lead Actress in a Drama Series (Sharon Gless)
- 1986 Award for Outstanding Supporting Actor in a Drama Series (John Karlen)
- 1986 Award for Outstanding Directing in a Drama Series (Georg Stanford Brown)
- 1987 Nomination for Outstanding Drama Series
- 1987 Nomination for Outstanding Directing in a Drama Series (Sharron Miller)
- 1987 Nomination for Outstanding Lead Actress in a Drama Series (Tyne Daly)
- 1987 Award for Outstanding Lead Actress in a Drama Series (Sharon Gless)
- 1987 Nomination for Outstanding Supporting Actor in a Drama Series (John Karlen)
- 1988 Award for Outstanding Lead Actress in a Drama Series (Tyne Daly)
- 1988 Nomination for Outstanding Lead Actress in a Drama Series (Sharon Gless)

==== Golden Globe Awards ====
- 1983 Nomination for Best Actress in a Drama Series (Tyne Daly)
- 1983 Nomination for Best Drama Series
- 1984 Nomination for Best Actress in a Drama Series (Tyne Daly)
- 1984 Nomination for Best Actress in a Drama Series (Sharon Gless)
- 1984 Nomination for Best Drama Series
- 1985 Nomination for Best Actress in a Drama Series (Tyne Daly)
- 1985 Award for Best Actress in a Drama Series (Sharon Gless)
- 1985 Nomination for Best Drama Series
- 1986 Nomination for Best Actress in a Drama Series (Tyne Daly)
- 1986 Nomination for Best Actress in a Drama Series (Sharon Gless)
- 1986 Nomination for Best Drama Series
- 1987 Nomination for Best Actress in a Drama Series (Sharon Gless)
- 1988 Nomination for Best Actress in a Drama Series (Sharon Gless)

==== Directors Guild Awards ====
- 1987 Nomination for Best Director in a Drama Series (Sharron Miller)

== After the series ==
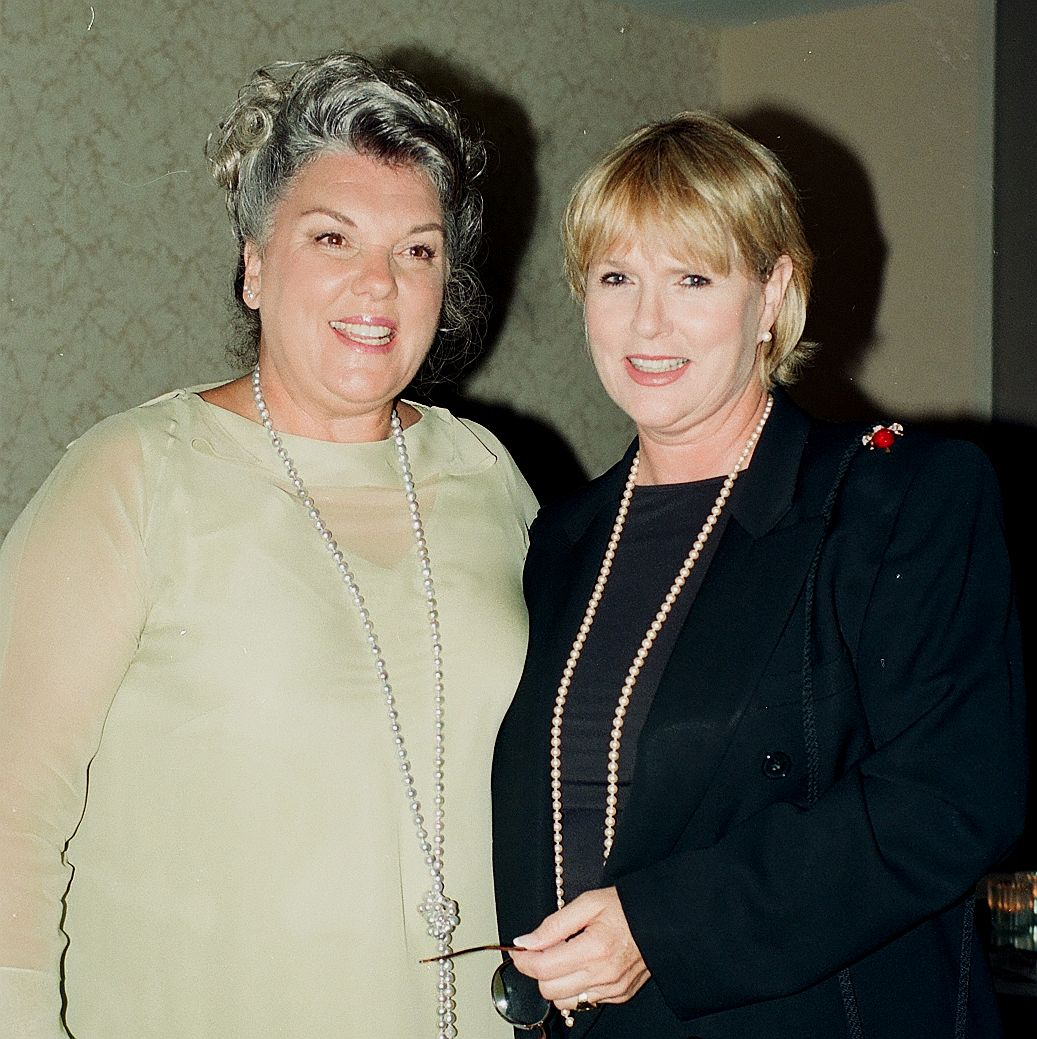
Daly and Gless in 1999.

The series was followed by four television films which reunite the characters Christine Cagney and Mary Beth Lacey. In the storyline, Cagney has been promoted to Lieutenant, and is now working at the District Attorney's office as a special investigator. Lacey, meanwhile, has retired from the police force. However, at Cagney's urging (and partly due to Mary Beth's strained financial circumstances), Mary Beth agrees to work for the D.A.'s office as well, thereby reuniting the old partnership.

John Karlen appears in all four movies as Harvey Lacey, as does Molly Orr playing Harvey and Mary Beth's school-age daughter Alice (who was seen as an infant in various series episodes). Making cameos in the first movie only are series regulars Martin Kove as Isbecki, Al Waxman as Lt. Samuels, Carl Lumbly as Marcus Petrie, Vonetta McGee as Claudia Petrie, Robert Hegyes as Esposito, and Paul Mantee as Corassa. Also seen in the first two films are James Naughton as Christine's husband James Burton (they soon were divorced), and David Paymer as Deputy D.A. Feldberg.

- Cagney & Lacey: The Return (1994)
- Cagney & Lacey: Together Again (1995)
- Cagney & Lacey: The View Through the Glass Ceiling (1995)
- Cagney & Lacey: True Convictions (1996)

Following the conclusion of Cagney & Lacey, Tyne Daly and Sharon Gless have reunited onscreen three times: all three times playing different characters. Daly guest-starred in an episode of Gless's 1990 series The Trials of Rosie O'Neill; Gless then guest-starred in 2003 on an episode of Daly's TV series Judging Amy, while Daly appeared in 2010 in an episode of Gless's series Burn Notice.

=== In popular culture ===
In the television show Brooklyn Nine-Nine, Lieutenant Terry Jeffords' twin daughters are named Cagney and Lacey.

=== Home media ===
On May 8, 2007, MGM Home Entertainment and 20th Century Fox Home Entertainment released Season 1 of Cagney & Lacey on DVD in Region 1. The release coincided with the 25th anniversary of the series and it features the first full season of the show (which is actually the second season of the series) when Sharon Gless joined the cast as Cagney.

The quartet of TV movies entitled The Menopause Years was released in 2009 by S'more Entertainment. The deluxe set contains the complete collection of post-series TV movies. In addition, one of the features, Cagney & Lacey: The Return, was released separately on the same day. As of 2012, these releases have been discontinued and are out of print.

In November 2012, Visual Entertainment released Cagney & Lacey – The Complete Series on DVD in Region 1. The 32-disc set contains all episodes of the series featuring Tyne Daly and Sharon Gless (seasons 2–7). They also released a separate season 2 release on the same day.

A separate collection only available to purchase online, entitled Cagney & Lacey – 30th Anniversary Limited Edition was released on November 27, 2012. This 38-disc set contains all the content from the Complete Series set as well as the pilot episode, the complete first season with Meg Foster as Cagney and Tyne Daly as Lacey, all four post-series Cagney & Lacey: The Menopause Years made-for-TV movies and special bonus features exclusive to this collection, such as an autographed photo from Sharon Gless and Tyne Daly, an audiobook of Barney Rosenzweig's "Cagney & Lacey ... and Me" An Inside Hollywood Story OR How I Learned to Stop Worrying and Love the Blonde, and footage of the British Film Institute's Cagney & Lacey 30th Anniversary Event from London. The Limited Edition DVD set is available through the official Cagney & Lacey website.

DVD name	Ep #	Release date	Additional information
The Complete First Season	22	May 8, 2007	"Breaking The Laws of TV" featurette
The Menopause Years	4	September 29, 2009	Includes all four post-series tele-films
The Complete Second Season	22	November 13, 2012	
30th Anniversary – The Complete Series	119	November 13, 2012	Includes all Cagney & Lacey season 2–7 episodes
30th Anniversary – The Complete Series Limited Edition with bonus features	125	November 27, 2012	Includes all Cagney & Lacey season 1–7 episodes, the original made-for-TV movie starring Loretta Swit plus extra features
30th Anniversary – The Best of Cagney & Lacey	8	July 15, 2014	A best-of collection of Cagney & Lacey season 3–7 episodes

=== Downloads ===
Since October 2009, all 125 episodes of Cagney & Lacey have been available as a digital download on iTunes in the UK and North America and were also licensed to Netflix for American viewers via the streaming option, which expired in April 2012, and is no longer available. In 2011, the four post-series telefilms were also added to the streaming option after they were licensed to Netflix partner Starz. That partnership ended in February 2012, and the telefilms ceased to run on Netflix streaming.

- Cagney & Lacey: The Lost Episodes — 6 episodes from Season 1
- Cagney & Lacey: The True Beginning — 22 episodes from Season 2
- Season 3 — 7 episodes from Season 3
- Season 4 — 22 episodes from Season 4
- Season 5 — all 24 episodes from Season 5
- Season 6 — all 22 episodes from Season 6
- Season 7 — all 22 episodes from Season 7

=== Aborted reboot ===
In January 2018, CBS ordered a pilot for a reboot of the series. In March, Sarah Drew and Michelle Hurd were cast as Cagney and Lacey, respectively, with Bridget Carpenter writing the pilot and Rosemary Rodriguez directing. Ving Rhames was cast in the role of police Captain Stark. CBS passed on the pilot on May 11.

== See also ==
- Rizzoli & Isles
- Scott & Bailey, a British TV series with a similar premise
