= Karen Carlson =

American retired actress (born 1945)

- Born: January 15, 1945 (age 81); Shreveport, Louisiana, U.S.
- Education: C.E. Byrd High School; University of Arkansas
- Occupations: Actress; director; producer; writer
- Years active: 1967–present
- Known for: The Candidate; The Octagon
- Spouses: David Soul (m. 1968; div. 1977) Devin Payne (m. 1983; div. 1996)
- Children: 3
- Website: karencarlson.org

Karen Carlson (born January 15, 1945) is an American retired actress. She is also a director, producer and writer.

== Early life ==
Carlson was born in Shreveport, Louisiana, the daughter of Mr. and Mrs. M.W. Carlson. She was educated at C.E. Byrd High School and the University of Arkansas, Fayetteville, where she was a member of Kappa Kappa Gamma. She represented the university and the state of Arkansas in the 1964 Miss America Pageant, finishing as the first runner-up to Vonda Kay Van Dyke.

Carlson started her career in Bob Hope and Phyllis Diller variety shows, Laugh In, and The Hollywood Palace. She also appeared in television series, films, and game shows including The Dating Game in 1966. She chose Bachelor number 3, future co star Robert Vaughn. Also, The Candidate (1972) with Robert Redford and The Octagon (1980) with Chuck Norris. On television, Carlson played Nancy Scotfield in ten episodes of the soap opera Dallas (1986) and Sarah Hallisey in twelve episodes of In the Heat of the Night. She was also a series regular in American Dream with Stephen Macht, The Yellow Rose with her first husband, David Soul, and Cybill Shepherd, and Two Marriages with Michael Murphy.

She was later cast as Mary Ellen in ABC's Here Come the Brides. She guest-starred in The Man from U.N.C.L.E. (1967), Mission: Impossible (1971), Bonanza (1973), Starsky and Hutch (1976–77) with David Soul, Centennial (1978), The Misadventures of Sheriff Lobo (1979), Hart to Hart (1980), Hill Street Blues (1983), and Hotel (1987). Her last appearance was a small part in the film Out of Ashes (2013).

== Personal life ==
Carlson is divorced from actor David Soul and musician Devin Payne. She has one child by Soul and two children with Payne.

== Filmography ==
Year	Title	Role	Notes
1968	The Man from U.N.C.L.E.	Helene	Episode: "The THRUSH Roulette Affair"
1968	Here Come the Brides	Girl	Episode: "Here Come the Brides"
1968–1969	Here Come the Brides	Mary Ellen	3 episodes
1969	I Dream of Jeannie	Betty	Episode: "Jeannie-Go-Round"
1969	The F.B.I.	Susan	Episode: "Boomerang"
1969	Shame, Shame, Everybody Knows Her Name	Susan Barton	
1970	Death Valley Days	Sarah Ewing	Episode: "The Mezcla Man"
1970	Death Valley Days	Annabelle Colvin	Episode: "Pioneer Pluck"
1970	Bracken's World	Katy	Episode: "One, Two, Three... Cry"
1970	The Student Nurses	Phred	
1970	Night Chase	Vico's wife	TV movie
1971	Mission: Impossible	Doris Gordon	Episode: "The Missile"
1971	My Three Sons	Sherry Cross	Episode: "After the Honeymoon"
1971	Getting Together	Connie	Episode: "Beep, Beep"
1971	The Smith Family	Elsa Martine	Episode: "Rumpus Room"
1971	Days of Our Lives	Sheila Hammond	1 episode
1971	McCloud	Receptionist	Episode: "A Little Plot at Tranquil Valley"
1971	Ironside	Gracie Atkins	Episode: "And Then There Was One"
1972	Love, American Style	(segment "Love and the Advice Column)	Episode: "Love and the Advice Column / Love and the Bathtub / Love and the Fullback / Love and the Guru / Love and the Physical"
1972	The Candidate	Nancy McKay	
1972	The F.B.I.	Dana Evans	Episode: "Edge of Desperation"
1972	Banyon	Juanita	Episode: "Sally Overman is Missing"
1972	Bonanza	Theodora Duffy	Episode: "The Marriage of Theodora Duffy:
1973	Mannix	Jennifer Holt	Episode: ‘’Search for a Whisper’’
1973	The Streets of San Francisco	Cathy Cullen	Episode: "Legion of the Lost"
1973	Shaft	Nancy Williamson	Episode: "The Kidnapping"
1974	Firehouse	Diane Harding	Episode: "Trapped"
1974	Police Woman	Gloria	Episode: "Seven Ellen"
1975	Movin' On	Janet Kingman	Episode: "Ransom"
1975	Archer	Judith Foster	Episode: "The Vanished Man"
1975	Cage Without a Key	Betty Holian	TV movie
1975	Barnaby Jones	Mrs. Jennings	Episode: "Jeopardy for Two"
1975	The First 36 Hours of Dr. Durant	Nurse Clive Olin	ABC Movie of the Week
1975	Matt Helm	Janet Larson	Episode: "Murder on Ice"
1975	Medical Story	Sheila Barringer	Episode: "Woman in White"
1976	S.W.A.T.	Laurie Wendell	Episode: "Dragons and Owls"
1976	Starsky and Hutch	Gillian Ingram	Episode: "Gillian"
1977	Tail Gunner Joe	Jean Kerr	TV movie
1977	Black Oak Conspiracy	Lucy Metcalf	
1977	Starsky and Hutch	Christine D. Phelps	Episode: "The Heroes"
1977	It Happened One Christmas	Violet	TV movie
1977	The Mask of Alexander Cross	Samantha	TV movie
1978	Matilda	Kathleen Smith	
1978	Centennial	Lisette Mercy	3 episodes
1978	CHiPs	Sheila Marin	Episode: "Supercycle"
1979	Buck Rogers in the 25th Century	Stella Warden	Episode: "Planet of the Slave Girls"
1979	The Misadventures of Sheriff Lobo	Lani	Episode: "The Mob Comes to Orly"
1980	The Incredible Hulk	Lorraine	Episode: "Broken Image"
1980	The Octagon	Justine	
1980	Hart to Hart	Marcie	Episode: "Murder, Murder On The Wall"
1981	American Dream	Donna Novak	7 episodes
1982	Lou Grant	Meredith Hall-Sutton	Episode: "Review"
1982	Dangerous Company	Janet Brody	TV movie
1982	T.J. Hooker	Tracy Hill	Episode: "The Streets"
1982	In Love with an Older Woman	Isobel	TV movie
1983	Hill Street Blues	Nancy McCoy	Episodes: "Moon Over Uranus", "Moon Over Uranus: The Sequel"
1983	Two Marriages	Ann Daley	Episodes: "Pilot", "Relativity"
1983	Lottery!		Episode: "Portland: Treasure Hunt"
1983–1984	The Yellow Rose	Marlene	Episodes: "The Yellow Rose", "Hell Hath No Fury", "Deadline"
1984	Fleshburn	Shirley Pinter	
1984	Finder of Lost Loves	Lorna Hodges	Episode: "White Lies"
1985	Brotherly Love	Donna Ryder	TV movie
1985	Wild Horses	Ann Cooper	TV movie
1986	Spenser: For Hire	Lanore Freemont	1 episode
1986	On Wings of Eagles	Ruth Chiapparone	Miniseries
1986	Shattered...If Your Kid's on Drugs	Eileen Wilson	Direct-to-video
1986–1987	Dallas	Nancy Scotfield	Recurring role (Season 10)
1985	Hotel	Diana Renard	Episode: "Identities"
1987	Hotel	Mrs. Harper	Episode: "Born to Run"
1989	Teen Vamp	Mrs. Murphy	
1992	Where the Red Fern Grows: Part Two		Direct-to-video
1993	I'll Fly Away	Jeanette Foster	Episode: "What's in a Name?"
1994	XXX's & OOO's		TV movie
1990–1994	In the Heat of the Night	Atty. Sarah Hallisey	12 episodes
1995	A Horse for Danny	Mrs. Slauson	TV movie
1997	The Man Next Door	Grace	
2008	A Father's Rights	Ms. Little	
2013	Shuffleton's Barbershop	Leslie Anne Cameron	Voice role
2018	Sparky & Butch	Cora	Short film
2024	In a Quiet Room	Julia	Short film

== Awards and nominations ==
Year	Award	Category	Nominated work	Result
1999	Heartland International Film Festival Crystal Heart Award		Climb Against the Odds	Won
1999	Rehoboth Beach Independent Film Festival Audience Award	Best Documentary	Climb Against the Odds	Won

Awards and achievements
Preceded by Pam Jackson	Miss Arkansas; 1964	Succeeded by Rhonda Oglesby
