= Barbara Avedon =

American screenwriter (1925–1994)

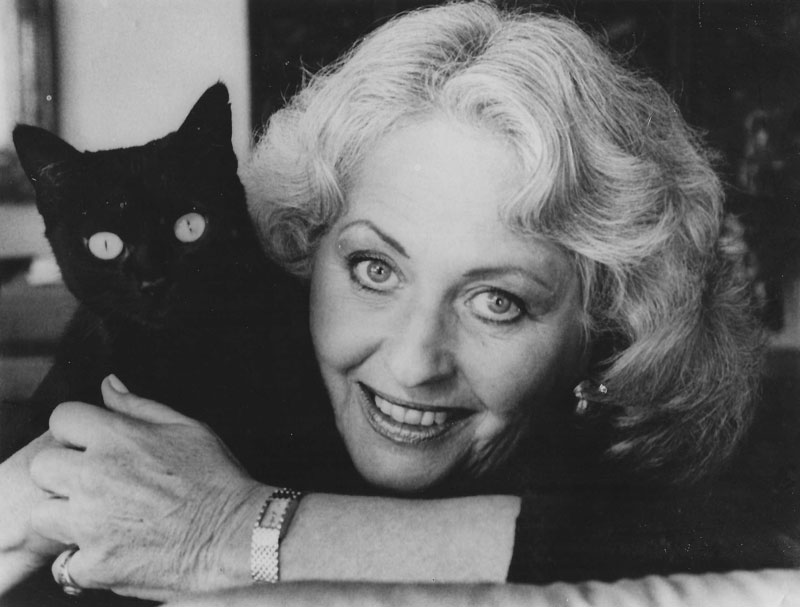
- Barbara Hammer Avedon and a black cat
- Born: June 29, 1930; Brooklyn, New York, USA
- Died: August 31, 1994 (aged 64); Palm Springs, California, USA
- Occupation: Television writer
- Known for: Creator of Cagney & Lacey with Barbara Corday; Founder of Another Mother for Peace
- Spouses: Irwin Gielgud (divorced) Phil Sharp (divorced) Mel Avedon (divorced)
- Children: Joshua Avedon

Barbara Hammer Avedon (June 29, 1930 – August 31, 1994) was an American television writer, political activist, and feminist. She founded the anti-war organization Another Mother for Peace.

== Biography ==
She was one of the writers for the television series Bewitched, and helped a group of Jefferson High School students write the episode "Sisters at Heart". She also wrote for Executive Suite and Fish, a 1977–78 spin-off from Barney Miller. With Barbara Corday, Avedon created Cagney & Lacey, the world's first dramatic television series to place women in both of its starring roles. They came up with the idea for this television series after having read Molly Haskell's book From Reverence to Rape which stated that there had never been a female buddy film. Avedon and Corday initially intended Cagney & Lacey to be a film. While they were writing the series together, Avedon was more experienced and proficient in screenwriting than Corday, and Avedon mentored Corday in this area throughout the series. They were best friends for nearly a decade.

== Personal life ==
Avedon married three times. Her first husband was screenwriter Irwin Gielgud. Her second was television writer Phil Sharp. Her third husband was oncologist Dr. Melvin Avedon; they had one child before the marriage was dissolved. Her son Joshua is a co-founder of Jumpstart, a not-for-profit that focused on transforming the broader Jewish community through spirituality, learning, social activism, and culture. Joshua is also one of the founders of the Jewish congregation IKAR.
