= Scott Merrill Siegler =

American TV executive (born 1947)

Scott Merrill Siegler (born February 15, 1947) is an American television executive and media investor who participated in the startup of TriStar Television studio, Netscape Communications, Pandora Media, and Granada America, and was one of the first Hollywood broadcast executives to anticipate the entertainment potential in digital media. In 1993 he formed a partnership with James H. Clark, a.k.a. Jim Clark, departing CEO of Silicon Graphics and founder of Mosaic Communications, the forerunner of Netscape Communications.

== Early life and education ==
Siegler was born in Columbus, Ohio. The family moved to a number of cities, including Boston, Washington, DC, and Memphis due to his father's medical training. In 1952 the family moved to Cleveland, Ohio, and Siegler was a graduate of Shaker Heights High School and Union College, 1969. He majored in English Literature and Philosophy, was elected to Phi Beta Kappa, and graduated summa cum laude.

He entered graduate school in 1969 at the University of Toronto, where he met and studied under the influential media theorist Marshall McLuhan, famous for the phrase "The medium is the message". McLuhan's predictions about an always-on, wired "global village" predated the internet by 30 years.

After earning an M.A. from the University of Toronto, Siegler attended Brandeis University, where he studied cinema and documentary film production and received an M.F.A. in 1973. He began writing and producing independent documentary films including "With Intent to Harm" and "Patriotism, Inc," and in 1976 went to work at WKYC-TV, the NBC-owned station in Cleveland, Ohio. He produced seven documentaries there, including the Emmy Award-winning "They Shall Take up Serpents." He moved to Los Angeles in 1978 to attend the American Film Institute's Center for Advanced Film Studies.

== Career ==
In 1978 Brandon Tartikoff hired Siegler as a current program executive at NBC Television network. The two remained friends until Tartikoff's death in 1997, a relationship described in Tartikoff's 1992 autobiography, The Last Great Ride.

Siegler moved to CBS in 1980, first as vice president of drama development at CBS television network (1980) and then as vice president of comedy, where he developed programs such as Simon & Simon, Falcon Crest, and Magnum, P.I. Following his tenure at CBS he became senior vice president of Warner Bros television, and there developed series such as Head of the Class, Growing Pains, V, and Night Court. He left Warner Bros in 1986 to found the television studio of the new TriStar Pictures, a venture partially owned by Coca-Cola and HBO. Within a year TriStar merged with the larger and older Columbia Pictures Television (now called Sony Pictures Television) and Siegler became president of the merged entity, displacing Barbara Corday, who has been with the studio since 1984. That studio was responsible for television series, movies, soap operas and mini-series, including Married... With Children and The Young and the Restless.

In 1993 Siegler left Columbia to invest time and money in "new media" ventures. He joined the boards of Tsunami Media (with CEO Ed Heinbockel and board member Steve Bannon), an early online game company, and American Cybercast, the first online entertainment company to produce episodic, advertiser-supported series ("The Spot", "The Pyramid") for the internet. He partnered with Jim Clark, the computer scientist who had previously founded Silicon Graphics in 1981, in an interactive video game television channel to be produced in conjunction with Nintendo, but the project never went beyond the planning stage.

During this time Clark, who had begun pondering the World Wide Web and the commercial possibilities of the internet, invited University of Illinois graduate student Marc Andreessen to his home in Atherton, California, in late 1993 to explain the internet and Andreessen's innovative navigator ("a yellow pages for the internet") that he called a browser. The University of Illinois internet navigation project had been called Mosaic, and that was the name adopted by Clark for its commercial application, Mosaic Communications. Siegler was a seed investor in that company, shortly renamed Netscape Communications. Netscape was sold to AOL in 2002 for $4.2B.

Other investments followed, including Savage Beast Technologies, later renamed Pandora Music, where Siegler served as board Chairman from 1998 to 2001. In 2002 Siegler joined Strauss Zelnick as a partner in ZelnickMedia, a private equity firm focused on the media and communications companies which employed revenue models different from those being employed by broadcast television. ZelnickMedia currently has a controlling interest in Take Two Media, the company behind the "Grand Theft Auto" online game series. Siegler ended his association with ZelnickMedia in 2009 and formed Mediasiegler, LLC as a vehicle for his continued media investing.

== Personal life ==
In 1990 Siegler competed on the United States team in the Ninth Annual World Championships of Elephant Polo, held at an airstrip near Royal Chitwan National Park, Nepal. The event was chronicled in Mad Dogs and Pachyderms in the December 16, 1991 issue of Sports Illustrated.

Siegler has been married three times and has had a son and a daughter. His daughter died in 2010 at the age of 13.
