= Fleshburn =

- Theatrical release poster
- Directed by: George Gage
- Written by: George Gage; Beth Gage
- Based on: Fear in a Handful of Dust by Brian Garfield (writing as John Ives)
- Produced by: Beth Gage
- Starring: Steve Kanaly; Karen Carlson
- Cinematography: Bill Pecchi
- Music by: Arthur Kempel
- Production company: Amritraj Productions
- Distributed by: Crown International Pictures (theatrical); Media Home Entertainment (VHS); Rhino Films (Re-release)
- Release dates: May 25, 1984; December 8, 2000 ((Re-release))
- Language: English

Fleshburn is a 1984 American thriller film written and directed by George Gage and starring Steve Kanaly, Karen Carlson and Sonny Landham.

== Cast ==
- Steve Kanaly as Dr. Sam MacKenzie
- Karen Carlson as Shirley Pinter
- Macon McCalman as Earl Dana
- Robert Chimento as Jay Pinter
- Sonny Landham as Calvin Duggai
- Robert Alan Browne as Jim Brody
- Duke Stroud as Smyley
- Larry Vigus as Marine Sergeant
- Newton John Skinner as Chris
