= Columbia TriStar Television =

American television production and distribution company (1994–2002)

Columbia TriStar Television, Inc.
- Type: Division
- Industry: Television
- Predecessors: Columbia Pictures Television; TriStar Television (second incarnation); Merv Griffin Enterprises
- Founded: February 21, 1994; 32 years ago
- Defunct: September 16, 2002; 24 years ago
- Fate: Renamed as Sony Pictures Television
- Successor: Sony Pictures Television
- Headquarters: 10202 West Washington Boulevard, Culver City, California, United States
- Area served: Worldwide
- Key people: Steve Mosko (president)
- Services: Television production; Broadcast syndication
- Parent: Sony Pictures Entertainment
- Divisions: Adelaide Productions; Trackdown Productions; Columbia TriStar International Television
- Subsidiaries: ELP Communications; Califon Productions; Jeopardy Productions; Rastar Television
- Website: spe.sony.com/tv at the Wayback Machine (archived 2001-12-11)

Columbia TriStar Television, Inc. (abbreviated as CTT), later known as Columbia TriStar Domestic Television (abbreviated as CTDT), was an American television production and distribution company, which was active from February 21, 1994, until its reincorporation as Sony Pictures Television on September 16, 2002. It was the third iteration of what had originated as Columbia Pictures' television studio, Screen Gems.

== History ==
Columbia TriStar Television was launched on February 21, 1994, from the merger of Columbia Pictures Television and TriStar Television, under the leadership of Jon Feltheimer, who was president of TriStar Television from 1991 to 1994 and of New World Television until 1991. After the merger, Columbia Pictures Television Distribution was renamed Columbia TriStar Television Distribution, although most traces of the former name were not removed in full until the start of the 1995 television season. It officially subsumed Merv Griffin Enterprises on June 4, 1994, and took over the role of production of Jeopardy! and Wheel of Fortune starting in September 1994, with both shows continuing to utilize King World for distribution, an arrangement that continued until 2025 under successor company CBS Media Ventures. In 1994, SPE acquired Stewart Television, which was known for the Pyramid franchise, to burnish the library for Sony's Game Show Network, which would launch on December 1, 1994.

Its global subsidiary, Columbia TriStar International Television, distributed Sony's programs outside North America, and was formed from Columbia Pictures International Television with TriStar International Television's merger into one unit in 1992.

In November 1995, Columbia TriStar Television established its kids and family entertainment division, Columbia TriStar Television Children's Programming, with Sander Schwartz named as senior vice president of the unit.

In July 1996, Sony merged their production units of Columbia Pictures Television and TriStar Television into the new Columbia TriStar Television production unit, led by Eric Tannenbaum, who was the head of TriStar Television, and around the same time partnered with CBS and 3 Arts Entertainment to start the new 3 Arts Television unit.

On January 30, 1997, Sony streamlined its American domestic operations. On March 12, 1997, Columbia TriStar Television signed a deal with Procter & Gamble Productions (P&G) to launch shows that P&G products sponsor, after the original agreement with Paramount Television expired. On August 26, 1997, Addis-Wechsler inked a five-year joint venture agreement with the studio to produce all forms of its own television programming. In 1999, Tannenbaum left CTT to head the new Artists Television Group, with CTT serving as distributor on all ATG productions.

On July 1, 2000, Barry Thurston stepped down as president of Columbia TriStar Television Distribution after 17 years and was succeeded by then-current president, Steve Mosko. Thurston was originally president of Embassy Telecommunications in 1983.

On October 25, 2001, Sony combined the domestic network and syndication divisions (Columbia TriStar Television and Columbia TriStar Television Distribution, respectively) into one unit known as Columbia TriStar Domestic Television.

During the beginning of the 2002–2003 television season, Sony Pictures Entertainment retired the "Columbia TriStar" name from its television divisions, and the television divisions became Sony Pictures Television and Sony Pictures Television International officially on September 16, 2002.

== See also ==
- List of Sony Pictures Television programs
- Screen Gems (1948–1974)
- Columbia Pictures Television
- TriStar Television
- Merv Griffin Enterprises
- Sony Pictures Television
