= TriStar Television =

Production label for Sony Pictures Television

TriStar Television, Inc.
- Logo used from 1992 to 1999
- Formerly: Tri-Star Television (1986–1988)
- Type: Division
- Industry: Television production
- Founded: March 1986; 40 years ago (first incarnation); October 1991; 35 years ago (second incarnation); May 28, 2015; 11 years ago (third incarnation)
- Defunct: January 4, 1988; 38 years ago (first iteration); June 1999; 27 years ago (second iteration); May 31, 2024; 2 years ago (third iteration)
- Fate: Merged with Columbia/Embassy Television (first incarnation); Folded into Columbia TriStar Television (second incarnation); Folded into Sony Pictures Television (third incaration)
- Successor: Columbia Pictures Television (first incarnation); Columbia TriStar Television (second incarnation); Sony Pictures Television (third incarnation)
- Headquarters: 10202 West Washington Boulevard, Culver City, California, United States
- Area served: Worldwide
- Parent: Tri-Star Pictures (1986–1988); Sony Pictures Entertainment (1991–1994); Columbia TriStar Television (1994–1999); Sony Pictures Television (2015–2024)

TriStar Television, Inc. (first spelled Tri-Star, and abbreviated as TT) was an American television production studio that was a division of Sony Pictures Television, a Sony Pictures Entertainment company. TriStar Television was launched in March 1986 by TriStar Pictures, and remained a joint-venture between Columbia Pictures, CBS, and HBO until it was acquired by Sony, the parent of both Columbia and TriStar. After a purchase by Sony Pictures Entertainment, both companies Columbia Pictures Television and TriStar Television merged and formed Columbia TriStar Television on February 21, 1994. The television studio was relaunched twice, most recently as a specialty label for Sony Pictures Television. The entity was originally a sister company of Columbia Pictures Television, which was shut down in 2001.

== History ==
=== From formation to merger with Columbia/Embassy Television (1986–1988) ===
The studio was formed when Tri-Star Pictures joined forces with Stephen J. Cannell Productions and Witt/Thomas Productions and created a television distribution company called TeleVentures. Scott Siegler was immediately hired as president of the studio. As the Tri-Star Television studio rolled around, the company inked overall deals with various personnel, like Ron Samuels, Richard Leder, Michael Jacobs, Larry Tucker, Donald P. Bellisario, Jim Green and Larry Epstein to help develop projects for the studio and decided that they would be involved in various television movies.

By December 1987, Coca-Cola owned 80% of Columbia Pictures Entertainment until January 1988, when it was reduced down to 49% and Tri-Star Television was then merged with Columbia/Embassy Television into the reorganized Columbia Pictures Television (CPT), although TeleVentures was retained to handle sales of the existing Tri-Star programs that were inherited under contract to CPT, which would continue as a separate sales and distribution company from the CPT unit. Scott remained president of the studio until he left in 1993. Columbia Pictures Entertainment was sold in November 1989 to Sony of Japan.

In late 1988, Witt/Thomas Productions withdrew from the TeleVentures venture, ceding it to Walt Disney Television, and sold its shares to Cannell. On July 11, 1990, both Tri-Star and Cannell dissolved the TeleVentures joint venture and Tri-Star sold its shares to Stephen J. Cannell Productions and TeleVentures became Cannell Distribution Co. Most of the series and the Tri-Star film packages that were distributed by TeleVentures were taken over by Columbia Pictures Television Distribution.

=== The first relaunch to the merger with Columbia TriStar Television (1991–1999) ===
CPT would continue on under Sony Pictures Entertainment (SPE), but TriStar Television was reestablished in October 1991 after CPT acquired some of the assets of New World Television. Jon Feltheimer, who was president of New World Television became the new president of TriStar Television. On March 15, 1993, star Larry Hagman had signed a deal with the studio to develop projects for the 1993–1994 television season. On February 21, 1994, TriStar Television merged with Columbia Pictures Television and formed Columbia TriStar Television (CTT). In 1997, most new shows, and some existing TriStar shows like Early Edition, shifted from TriStar Television to CTT, and also in January 1997, changed monikers from Sony Television Entertainment to Columbia TriStar Television Group.

When TriStar Television's productions were folded into Columbia TriStar Television in 1999, Early Edition (a joint production with CBS) retained the TriStar copyright until 2000. The final season of Malcolm & Eddie was later produced by CTT and TriStar Television operated in-name-only. On October 25, 2001, Columbia TriStar Television and Columbia TriStar Television Distribution merged to become Columbia TriStar Domestic Television. On September 16, 2002, SPE retired the Columbia and TriStar names from television, renaming CTDT as Sony Pictures Television.

=== The second relaunch to the shutdown (2015–2024) ===
On May 28, 2015, TriStar Television was re-launched as a boutique production label for Sony Pictures Television. Until her death in March 2018, TriStar Television was run by Suzanne Patmore-Gibbs after being in-name-only for 15 years. The first new series was Good Girls Revolt and was piloted for Amazon Prime Video on November 5, 2015.

On May 31, 2024, Sony announced they would shut down its TriStar Television boutique label, folding it into its drama department. The move was announced after the departures of Nicole Norwood and Jennifer Turner. Newer projects in development were taken over by Sony Pictures Television.

== Filmography ==
=== Television series ===
Title	Years	Network	Notes
Downtown	1986–1987	CBS	Co-production with Ron Samuels Productions
Take Five	1987	CBS	Co-production with Imagine Television and Empire City Presentations
Nothing in Common	1987	NBC	Co-production with Rastar Television; Based on the 1986 film of the same name by Tri-Star Pictures
Werewolf	1987–1988	Fox	Produced by Columbia Pictures Television in 1988
My Two Dads	1987–1990	NBC	Co-production with Michael Jacobs Productions; Produced by Columbia Pictures Television from 1988 to 1990
Buck James	1987–1988	ABC	Co-production with Robert E. Fuisz-William F. Storke Productions; Produced by Columbia Pictures Television in 1988
Get a Life	1990–1992	Fox	Co-production with Elliottland Productions and Mirkinvision; Produced by New World Television from 1990 to 1991
The Adventures of Mark & Brian	1991–1992	NBC	Co-production with Don Mischer Productions, Frontier Pictures and New World Television
Charlie Hoover	1991	Fox	Co-production with Ian Gurvitz Productions and Brillstein-Grey Entertainment
The Fifth Corner	1992	NBC	Co-production with Jon Herzfield Productions and Adelson-Baumgarten Productions
The Boys of Twilight	1992	CBS	Co-production with Echo Cove Productions
Forever Knight	1992–1996	CBS (season 1); Syndication (season 2); USA Network (season 3)	Co-production with Glen-Warren Great Entertainment (season 1), Paragon Entertainment Corporation and Tele-München
The Edge	1992–1993	Fox	Co-production with Mirkinvision
Mad About You	1992–1999	NBC	Co-production with In Front Productions and Nuance Productions; Produced by Sony Pictures Television in 2019
Tribeca	1993	Fox	Co-production with Montana Beach Productions and TriBeCa Productions
Good Advice	1993–1994	CBS	Co-production with In Front Productions and Itzbinso Long Productions
The Nanny	1993–1999	CBS	Co-production with Sternin & Fraser Ink Inc. and Highschool Sweethearts (1995–1999)
The Mighty Jungle	1994	The Family Channel	Co-production with Le Sabre, Goodman/Rosen Productions and Alliance Communications
TV Nation	1994–1995	NBC (season 1); Fox (season 2); BBC2	Co-production with Dog Eat Dog Films and BBC
Women of the House	1995	CBS (episodes 1–8); Lifetime (episodes 9–13)	Co-production with Bloodworth-Thomason Mozark Productions and Perseverance Inc.
Simon	1995–1996	The WB	Co-production with In Front Productions
Ned and Stacey	1995–1997	Fox	Co-production with Hanley Productions
Can't Hurry Love	1995–1996	CBS	Co-production with The Producers Entertainment Group Ltd., Axelrod-Widdoes Productions and CBS Productions
Hudson Street	1995–1996	ABC	Co-production with Katie Face Productions
Dead By Sunset	1995	NBC	Co-production with Craig Anderson Productions; Miniseries
Matt Waters	1996	CBS	Co-production with Christmas Tree Entertainment and James D. Pariott Productions
Malcolm & Eddie	1996–1999	UPN	Co-production with Jeff Franklin Productions; Produced by Columbia TriStar Television from 1999 to 2000
Moloney	1996–1997	CBS	Co-production with Predawn Productions and CBS Productions
Love and Marriage	1996	Fox	Co-production with Dorothy Parker Drank Here Productions
Early Edition	1996–1997	CBS	Co-production with Three Characters Productions (seasons 1 and 2), Angelica Films (seasons 1 and 2) and CBS Productions; Produced by Columbia TriStar Television from 1997 to 2000
Life... and Stuff	1997	CBS	Co-production with Sommers-Teitelbaum-David and Perrgood Productions
Good Girls Revolt	2015–2016	Amazon Prime Video	Co-production with Lynda Obst Productions, Annabelita Films, Farm Kid and Amazon Studios
Shut Eye	2016–2017	Hulu	Co-production with Peg + Les and Gran Via Productions
The Last Tycoon	2016–2017	Amazon Prime Video	Co-production with Kippster Entertainment, City Entertainment, Brady American Productions, Home Run Productions, Inc. and Amazon Studios
On Becoming a God in Central Florida	2019	Showtime	Co-production with Smokehouse Pictures, Pali Eyes Pictures and Showtime Networks
The Afterparty	2022–2023	Apple TV+	Co-production with Lord Miller Productions and Sony Pictures Television Studios
Lucky Hank	2023	AMC	Co-production with Afternoon Nap Productions, Ponyboy Productions, Gran Via Productions, Le Foole Inc. and AMC Studios
