= Barbara Corday =

American screenwriter (born 1944)

- Born: October 15, 1944 (age 81); Brooklyn, New York
- Occupations: Television producer, writer, studio executive
- Spouses: Michael Gershman (m. 1966; div. 1969) Noah Keen (m. 1972; div. 1974) Barney Rosenzweig (m. 1979; div. 1990) Roger Lowenstein (m. 1992)
- Children: 1

Barbara Sue Corday (born October 15, 1944) is an American television executive, writer and producer known for co-creating the television series Cagney & Lacey.

== Early life and education ==
Corday was born to a Jewish family in Brooklyn, New York City on October 15, 1944, the only child of Josephine "Josie" (née Rich) and Leo Corday. Her parents were both worked in the entertainment business: her mother was a professional singer and dancer, and her father wrote songs and jingles and was an editor of the Jewish Daily Forward.

Her parents divorced when she was a teenager. She then moved to Miami with her mother where they had family and attended North Miami High School. After high school, at the age of 16, she moved back to New York City and worked as a receptionist for the Max Richards Theatrical agency which acted as an employment agency for actors.

== Work ==
After a year working as a receptionist, a family friend got her a job as a publicist at Mo Braveman Associates that represented nightclubs, singers, performers; she later went to work for Dorothy Ross Associates which represented Broadway shows. She credits her publicist background with learning how to write on demand. She moved to Los Angeles in the late 1960s after Henry C. Rogers approached her and her husband Michael Gershman (who was also a publicist) and asked them to start a music department for Rogers & Cowan particularly in representing Rock bands. She had to step down from the role because she became pregnant with her daughter. In 1972, Corday joined and worked as a publicist for the anti-war organization Another Mother for Peace where she met its founder, Barbara Avedon who was also a new mother. Avedon got their foot in the door with their projects because she had prior experience working on TV series like The Donna Reed Show, Father Knows Best, The Danny Thomas Show, The Ann Sothern Show, Margie, Gidget, Medical Center and That Girl. Danny Arnold hired them to write a script for a Barbara Eden pilot (which never went to development). They worked so well together, they officially became writing partners. From 1972 to 1979, they wrote several episodes for television series and a few pilots as free-lance writers including 19 episodes of Fish, 4 episodes of Sons and Daughters, Executive Suite, Wonder Woman, Maude, and Turnabout (where they met Sharon Gless). In 1974, they started working on Cagney and Lacey and tried to sell the script but were unsuccessful despite having support from Ed Feldman, executive in charge of film development at Filmways and from Sherry Lansing at MGM.

After giving up writing, Corday worked at several networks and made a career as top executive. In 1979, she dissolved her writing partnership with Barbara Avedon but they would team up again for a short time in 1981. Corday was scouted by Marcy Carsey who was then senior vice president of prime-time series at ABC. She took a position developing comedies for ABC in 1979 developing the comedies Bosom Buddies and Reggie. Over the next ten years, she moved up the executive ladder. In 1981, the script for Cagney and Lacey was finally accepted by CBS who made a movie followed by a TV series which aired from 1982 to 1988. After she left ABC, she started a Columbia Pictures-affiliated production company Can't Sing Can't Dance Productions. In 1984, Columbia exec, Herman Rush, recommended that she take over his position as a president of Columbia Pictures which made her the first female senior executive at Coca-Cola which then owned Columbia Pictures. In 1987, she was named president and chief operating officer of Columbia/Embassy Television, a now defunct division of Coca-Cola Television that produced TV series and TV movies. Shortly after the formation of Columbia Pictures Entertainment, she was displaced as president by then-Tri-Star Television executive Scott Siegler. In 1988, Larry Tisch and Howard Stringer hired her as executive vice president of Primetime Programming at CBS Entertainment; she left in 1990 after her boss, network entertainment president Kim LeMasters resigned in 1990. In 1992, Corday signed a deal with Lorimar Television to be co-executive producer of the popular prime-time television series Knots Landing and from 1993 to 1994, she served as president of New World Television.

== Personal life ==
In 1966, she married her first husband Michael Gershman and they divorced in 1969; they had one daughter.

On April 8, 1972, Corday married actor Noah Keen, who was 23 years her senior. They divorced in 1974; he died March 24, 2019, at the age of 98.

On June 3, 1979, Corday married Barney Rosenzweig and became stepmother to his three children by his first wife, Jo Anne Lang. They divorced in 1990. The following year, Rosenzweig married actress Sharon Gless, co-star of Cagney & Lacey, a series that he produced, created by Corday and her writing partner, Barbara Avedon (1925-1994).

In 1992, Corday married Roger Lowenstein, a lawyer who practiced in the entertainment industry.

On November 8, 2007 she became a grandmother to Riley Noah & Greyson J

== Political activities ==
Corday was a founding member of the Hollywood Women's Political Committee, which operated from 1984 to 1997.

== Sources ==
- biography at mbc
- biography on The Paley Center For Media
