= Downtown (1986 TV series) =

- Genre: Crime drama
- Created by: Marc Norman
- Starring: Michael Nouri; Robert Englund; Milicent Martin; Blair Underwood; Mariska Hargitay
- Opening theme: "Money (That's What I Want)" performed by Ronnie Milsap
- Composer: Johnny Harris
- Country of origin: United States
- Original language: English
- No. of seasons: 1
- No. of episodes: 13

Production
- Executive producers: Ron Samuels; Reuben Leder
- Production companies: Ron Samuels Productions; Tri-Star Television

Original release
- Network: CBS
- Release: September 27, 1986 – August 22, 1987

Downtown is an American crime drama television series produced by Ron Samuels Productions and Tri-Star Television that aired on CBS from September 27, 1986 until August 22, 1987. The name in Brazil was Linha Dura.

== Premise ==
An LAPD veteran is assigned with supervising four parolees (a kleptomaniac dowager; a con artist; a young karate expert with attitude and a wise-mouthed pickpocket) who help him solve crimes while trying to keep them out of jail at the same time.

== Cast ==
- Michael Nouri as Detective John Forney
- Robert Englund as Dennis Shotoffer
- Milicent Martin as Harriet Conover
- Blair Underwood as Terry Corsaro
- Mariska Hargitay as Jesse Smith
- Virginia Capers as Delia Bonner
- David Paymer as Captain David Kiner

== Episodes ==
| No. | Title | Directed by | Written by | Original release date |
|---|---|---|---|---|
| 1 | "Stan, the Man" | Unknown | Reuben Leder | September 27, 1986 |
Foley chases a robbery suspect.
| 2 | "Colors" | Unknown | Phil Combest | October 4, 1986 |
A friend of Terry is killed in a holdup.
| 3 | "The Spring Line" | Victor Lobl | Marianne Clarkson | October 11, 1986 |
Someone is planning to sabotage the fall line of a clothing designer.
| 4 | "Since I Don't Have You" | Unknown | Christopher Beaumont | October 18, 1986 |
Harriet has romantic feelings for a man who is suspected of selling government secrets.
| 5 | "Out of the Tombs" | Unknown | Unknown | October 25, 1986 |
Dennis helps a newsman go after a vanished criminal.
| 6 | "When Dinosaurs Drove the Earth" | Unknown | Unknown | November 1, 1986 |
During a bank robbery, Harriet is taken hostage.
| 7 | "Saturday Night" | Noel Nosseck | Marianne Clarkson | November 11, 1986 |
Dennis becomes a suspect in a serial-murder case.
| 8 | "Outlaws" | Unknown | Downtown | November 29, 1986 |
Forney is suspended when he goes after a brutal gang.
| 9 | "Goin' to California" | Unknown | Phil Combest | December 6, 1986 |
Jesse's marine brother comes home from Beirut.
| 10 | "Tracks of My Tears" | Unknown | Christopher Beaumont | December 13, 1986 |
Kiner wants to prove that the murder of a senator friend was set up to look like a suicide.
| 11 | "Flowers" | Unknown | Unknown | December 20, 1986 |
The daughter of a blind street vendor is targeted by a recently released convict.
| 12 | "Rock 'n' Roll Will Never Die" | Unknown | Christopher Beaumount | December 27, 1986 |
A rock singer is attacked by a mysterious man.
| 13 | TBA | Unknown | Unknown | August 22, 1987 |
