= Jon Feltheimer =

American film producer

- Born: September 2, 1951 (age 75); New York City, US
- Education: Washington University in St. Louis
- Occupation: Media executive
- Known for: CEO, Lionsgate Studios; CEO, Lions Gate Entertainment, (2000–2024)
- Spouse: Laurie Demarest
- Children: 4

Jon Feltheimer (born September 2, 1951) is the CEO of Lionsgate Studios. Prior to its formation, he led Canadian independent film studio Lions Gate Entertainment, since 2000.

== Early life ==
Feltheimer received a BA in economics with honors from Washington University in St. Louis.

== Career ==
TriStar Television, Sony Pictures

Feltheimer helped engineer the creation of TriStar Television for Sony Pictures Entertainment (SPE), where he became the head of the Columbia TriStar Television Group and executive vice president of SPE. At SPE, he oversaw the development of Forever Knight, Mad About You, The Nanny, Walker, Texas Ranger, Early Edition, Dawson's Creek, Party of Five, and The King of Queens.

Lions Gate Entertainment

Feltheimer was named the CEO of Lions Gate Entertainment in March 2000. Under his leadership, Lionsgate received 25 Academy Award nominations and seven Oscar wins including for Crash (film), the Best Picture of 2006. In 2024, Lionsgate announced the extension of Jon Feltheimer's contract through August 2029.

Feltheimer also was an advisor of ZeniMax Media and a member of Telltale Games board of directors.

== Personal life ==
Feltheimer is married to Laurie Demarest; and has 4 children. He and his wife are supporting members of Kehillat Israel, a Reconstructionist congregation in Pacific Palisades, Los Angeles.

In 2010, he received the MIPCOM Personality of the Year award.

In April 2016, Feltheimer received the Simon Wiesenthal Center Humanitarian Award.
