= From Reverence to Rape =

1974 cinema history book by Molly Haskell

From Reverence to Rape: The Treatment of Women in the Movies
- The University of Chicago Press revised edition
- Author: Molly Haskell
- Language: English
- Publisher: New English Library (Reprint by University of Chicago Press)
- Publication date: 1974 (revised 1987 and 2016)
- Publication place: United States
- Media type: Print (paperback, hardback)
- ISBN: 0-226-31885-0

From Reverence to Rape: The Treatment of Women in the Movies is a 1974 book (revised and reissued in 1987 and 2016) by feminist film critic Molly Haskell (born 1939). It was one of the first books to chronicle and analyze the "image of woman" in film. Along with Marjorie Rosen's Popcorn Venus and Joan Mellen's Women and Their Sexuality in the New Film, Haskell's book typified the second-wave feminist explorations of film history. She compared the depictions of women on-screen to real-life women off-screen to determine if the representations of women in Hollywood were accurate.

The book's title conveys Haskell's view that women in film had moved from one unrealistic extreme to another. In the silents and early talkies, women were often idealized and put on a pedestal according to Victorian values. But in the mid-1970s cinema, Haskell saw "a general deterioration in the way their sex has been portrayed":

Here we are today, with an unparalleled freedom of expression, and a record number of women performing, achieving, choosing to fulfill themselves, and we are insulted with the worst—the most abused, neglected, and dehumanized—screen heroines in film history.

== "The Big Lie" ==
Haskell makes it clear in the first chapter that she believes cinema, like other cultural products, serves "the big lie perpetrated on Western society", specifically, "the idea of women's inferiority, a lie so deeply ingrained in our social behavior that merely to recognize it is to risk unraveling the entire fabric of civilization." She writes:

The anomaly that women are the majority of the human race, half of its brains, half of its procreative power, most of its nurturing power, and yet are its servants and romantic slaves was brought home with peculiar force in the Hollywood film.

== The Twenties and Thirties ==
In the book's next hundred pages, Haskell analyzes dozens of films and actresses from the 1920s and '30s. She identifies a series of recurring female stereotypes: "virgin-heroines", "vamps", "party girls", etc. She notes how Lillian Gish and Janet Gaynor sometimes portrayed women who were "feminine" and demure on the outside, but steely on the inside, calling it the "women-rule-the-world-but-don't-tell-anybody" school because these female characters made a point of concealing their strength.

== "The Woman's Film" ==
In a chapter about "the woman's film" of the 1930s and '40s, Haskell says the genre was by its very nature demeaning:

As a term of critical opprobrium, "woman's film" carries the implication that women, and therefore women's emotional problems, are of minor significance. A film that focuses on male relationships is not pejoratively dubbed a "man's film" ... but a "psychological drama."

She adds that the "woman's film" emerged perhaps as compensation for "all the male-dominated universes from which she has been excluded: the gangster film, the Western, the war film, the policier, the rodeo film, the adventure film." Haskell suggests that women's films were no more maudlin or self-pitying than male adventure films, which British critic Raymond Durgnat labeled "male weepies". The man's film celebrates the times before settling down, when men were battling nature or the enemy. Marriage becomes the killjoy: "All the excitement of life—the passion, the risk—occurs outside marriage rather than within it." At a soap opera level, which Haskell considers the lowest level, a woman's film "fills a masturbatory need, it is soft-core emotional porn for the frustrated housewife." These "weepies" are focused on "self-pity and tears, to accept, rather than reject, their lot."

=== Woman's film characters ===
According to Haskell's taxonomy, three types of women characters appeared in the woman's film:

1. The Extraordinary woman
  - Strong, emancipated characters played, for example, by Bette Davis and Rosalind Russell.
2. The Ordinary woman
  - These women are common, passive, and often victims. They are precursors to soap opera characters.
3. The Ordinary woman who becomes extraordinary
  - The victims who rise, or endure.

=== Woman's film themes ===
Here are the four prevalent themes Haskell identifies in the woman's film:

(1) Sacrifice. The female protagonist must either sacrifice:

- Herself for her children.
- Her children for their own welfare.
- Her marriage for her lover.
- Her lover for marriage or for his own welfare.
- Her career for love.
- Her love for her career.

Her martyrdom is proportionate to the level of guilt she carries. The 1930s and '40s films involving a woman's sacrifice usually had a tragic ending.

(2) Affliction:

- The woman holds a terrible secret about her past, or is concealing a fatal disease.

(3) Choice:

- The heroine is pursued by two or more suitors. Their future happiness depends on her decision.

At least one of the suitors—a confirmed bachelor or clergyman—is cynical about women, and can only be "cured" by her.

(4) Competition:

- The heroine must do battle with another woman whose husband, fiancé, etc. she loves.

== Later chapters ==
In the book's concluding chapters, Haskell surveys the film scene in the 1970s and is troubled by "the great women's roles of the decade":

Whores, quasi-whores, jilted mistresses, emotional cripples, drunks, Daffy ingenues, Lolitas, kooks, sex-starved spinsters, psychotics. Icebergs, zombies, and ballbreakers.

What Haskell wants at the cinema is attention to "a subtle, vital detail", namely, "the degree to which a woman, however small her part, is seen to have an interior life: a continuum which precedes and succeeds her relationship with men and by which she, too, defeats time temporarily and transcends her biological fate." The films which best meet Haskell's criteria were illustrated by the relationships between Lauren Bacall and Humphrey Bogart in To Have and Have Not (1944), and between Katharine Hepburn and Spencer Tracy in Adam's Rib (1949) and Pat and Mike (1952).

== Reception ==
In a review of From Reverence to Rape in Diacritics, David Grossvogel wrote that Haskell's book struggles with "definitional problems" because the target of her discussion is often shifting around:

Haskell speaks sometimes about the movies as if they were accurate sociological documents—correct representations of the American woman between 1920 and the present. Sometimes, her very argument requires her to acknowledge that the motion pictures distorted the image of the American woman. And at still other times, she finds herself speaking of an actual person, the woman as movie actress, whose private life is variously given as an evidence that is reflected in her role, that transcends her role, or that is in deliberate contradiction to that role. It is especially Haskell's admiration for certain screen personalities that blurs the distinctions between the public (fictional) image and the private person. When she notes, for example, that "Garbo herself was not without traces of self-mockery. The raised eyebrow indicated infinite knowledge of the world including a playful regard for her own image", Haskell allows the contamination of two discrete worlds.

In a New York Times review of the book, Jane Wilson noted how Haskell occasionally becomes "extraordinarily angry—and her fury breaks through repeatedly to sour the proceedings and muddle her thinking." But Wilson praises the way the author gathers and presents evidence to prove her points:

This she does very well, first organizing her material by decades, from the twenties to the fifties, adding chapters on "The Europeans" and "The Woman's Film," and then tying the whole sorry story together with a survey of the past ten years.
