= Molly Haskell =

American film and theatre critic

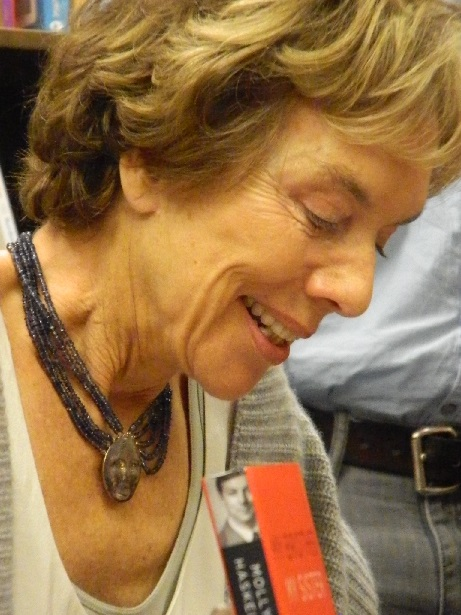
- Haskell in 2013
- Born: Molly Clark Haskell; September 29, 1939 (age 87); Charlotte, North Carolina, U.S.
- Education: St. Catherine's School; Sweet Briar College; University of London; University of Paris
- Occupation: Film critic
- Spouse: Andrew Sarris (m. 1969; died 2012)
- Website: www.mollyhaskell.com

Molly Clark Haskell (born September 29, 1939) is an American film critic and author. She contributed to The Village Voice—first as a theatre critic, then as a movie reviewer—and from there moved on to New York magazine and Vogue. Her most influential book is From Reverence to Rape: The Treatment of Women in the Movies (1974; revised and reissued in 1987). She co-hosted Turner Classic Movies' The Essentials with Robert Osborne in 2006 for one season.

== Early life and education ==
Molly Haskell was born in Charlotte, North Carolina, and grew up in a house on Pocahontas Avenue in Richmond, Virginia. She was the daughter of Mary Haskell, who studied at the Art Students League in New York City, was a member of the Richmond Artists Association, and regularly exhibited her paintings in group and solo shows.

Haskell attended St. Catherine's School, Sweet Briar College, the University of London and the Collège de Sorbonne before settling in New York. She was presented as a debutante at the Bal du Bois. In the 1960s, she worked for the French Film Office, where she wrote a newsletter about that country's films for the New York press and served as an interpreter for French film directors attending openings of their movies in New York.

== Career ==
Haskell then worked at The Village Voice, and became a movie reviewer. Haskell also wrote for New York magazine and Vogue.

In the documentary For the Love of Movies: The Story of American Film Criticism (2009), Haskell discusses her time at Village Voice in the 1960s when she looked at film dually, "both as a film lover and as a feminist" and of how, at a young age, she was affected by the French film, Les Diaboliques (1955). She is one of the main contributors to the 2013 documentary "In Search of the Ideal Male: Made in Hollywood" where she explores the evolution of gender roles in Hollywood.

The publications Haskell has written for include The New York Times, The Guardian, Esquire, The Nation, Town and Country Magazine, the New York Observer, The New York Review of Books, and Film Comment. She was Artistic Director of the Sarasota French Film Festival, has served on the selection committee of the New York Film Festival, and been associate Professor of Film at Barnard College and Adjunct Professor of Film at Columbia University.

Haskell participated in the 2012 Sight & Sound critics' poll, where she listed her ten favorite films as follows: À Nos Amours, Au hasard Balthazar, The Awful Truth, Chinatown, Claire's Knee, I Know Where I'm Going!, Madame de..., The Shop Around the Corner, Sunrise: A Song of Two Humans, and Vertigo.

== Personal life ==
Haskell was married to fellow film critic Andrew Sarris, who died on June 20, 2012.

Haskell's sibling later came out as a transgender woman and was the subject of her memoir My Brother, My Sister.

== Honors and awards ==
In 2013, Haskell received an Athena Film Festival Award for her leadership, creativity and the extraordinary example she sets for other women in the field. She was American Academy of Arts and Sciences Fellow of 2019.

== Works ==
- From Reverence to Rape: The Treatment of Women in the Movies (1974; revised and reissued in 1987); ISBN 0-226-31885-0.
- Love and Other Infectious Diseases: A Memoir. New York: William Morrow, 1990, ISBN 978-0-688-07006-9.
- Holding My Own in No Man's Land: Women and Men and Films and Feminists. New York: Oxford University Press, 1997, ISBN 978-0-19-505309-8.
- Frankly, My Dear: "Gone with the Wind" Revisited. New Haven, Conn.: Yale University Press, 2009, ISBN 978-0-300-11752-3.
- Mary Pickford: Queen of the Movies. Lexington, Kentucky: University Press of Kentucky, 2012. ISBN 9780813136479
- My Brother My Sister: A Story of Transformation. New York: Viking, 2013, ISBN 978-0-670-02552-7.
- Steven Spielberg: A Life in Films (Jewish Lives). Yale University Press, 2017. ISBN 978-0300186932
