= Peter Lefcourt =

American novelist

- Born: 1946 (age 79–80)
- Occupations: Television producer; screenwriter; novelist
- Spouse: Terri
- Website: peterlefcourt.com

Peter Lefcourt (born 1946) is an American television producer, a film and television screenwriter, and a novelist.

Lefcourt's early career involved writing teleplays for primetime series such as Cagney and Lacey, Scarecrow and Mrs. King (both of which he also produced), Eight is Enough, and Remington Steele, among others. He penned the scripts for the television movies Monte Carlo, Cracked Up, Danielle Steel's Fine Things, and The Women of Windsor. In more recent years he executive-produced and wrote for Beggars and Choosers and Karen Sisco.

Lefcourt was nominated for a 1984 Emmy Award for Outstanding Drama Series for Cagney and Lacey and won the following year.

Much of Lefcourt's fiction has been inspired by his true-life experiences working behind-the-scenes in Hollywood. His first novel, The Deal, was adapted for the screen by William H. Macy and debuted at the 2008 Sundance Film Festival. Several others of his books are under option or in various stages of development for feature films.

His other novels are The Dreyfus Affair (1992), Di & I (1994), Abbreviating Ernie (1997), The Woody (1998), Eleven Karens (2003), The Manhattan Beach Project (2005), Le Jet Lag (2007), An American Family (2010) and Purgatory Gardens (2015).

Lefcourt lives with his wife Terri in Santa Monica, California.

In a 2012 interview with Larry Mantle on KPCC's Airtalk, Lefcourt stated he signed with Amazon.com to publish and distribute his most recent book "with some trepidation". He said friends told him he was 'joining the enemy', but his backlist is selling better electronically on Amazon.com than in it did at traditional booksellers while in print.

== Bibliography ==
- The Deal, about a down-and-out movie producer whose leading man is kidnapped from the set during filming
- The Dreyfus Affair, a comic look at homophobia in baseball with many allusions to the historical event
- Di & I, a fictionalized account of Lefcourt's love affair with Diana, Princess of Wales
- Abbreviating Ernie, about a Prozac-popping Schenectady housewife accused of murdering her urologist husband
- Le Jet Lag, Charlie Berns returns along with 4 hapless Americans at the Cannes Film Festival
- The Woody, inspired by his research for an HBO film about the 1995 Bob Packwood scandal
- Eleven Karens, an erotic memoir of his love affairs with eleven women named Karen
- The Manhattan Beach Project, a spoof of reality television featuring the lead character in The Deal
- An American Family, A sprawling narrative of five siblings, born in the 1940s, beginning on the day John F. Kennedy was shot and ending on 9/11.
