= Barney Rosenzweig =

American television producer (born 1937)

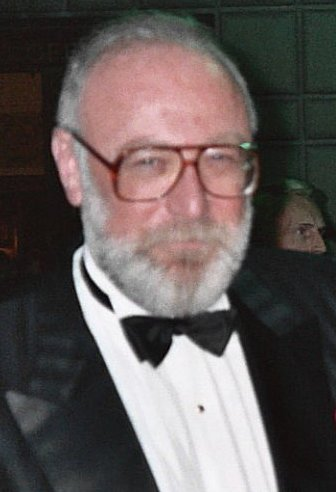
- Rosenzweig at the Governor's Ball following the 1991 Emmy Awards
- Born: December 23, 1937 (age 88); Los Angeles, California, U.S.
- Education: Montebello High School; University of Southern California (B.A.)
- Occupation: Television producer
- Spouses: JoAnne Lang (m. 1959; div. 1969) Barbara Corday (m. 1979; div. 1990) Sharon Gless (after 1991)
- Children: 3

Barney Rosenzweig (born December 23, 1937) is an American television producer.

== Biography ==
Rosenzweig was born to a Jewish family in Los Angeles and graduated from Montebello High School in 1955. His father was a schoolteacher and his mother a civil servant. Rosenzweig graduated from University of Southern California.

His first job was in the mailroom at MGM although he soon became a publicist, a position he disliked. With the aid of his father-in-law, Aaron Rosenberg, he secured a position as a producer. Before concentrating exclusively on television, he produced an unsuccessful independent film, The Legend of Hillbilly John (1972). He produced the 1980s television series Cagney & Lacey written by his then wife Barbara Corday and Barbara Avedon. He also produced the 1960s series Daniel Boone, as well as a dozen episodes of Charlie's Angels. He subsequently created and produced The Trials of Rosie O'Neill, which starred his third wife Sharon Gless and ran for two seasons in the early 1990s.

In 1985, he set up The Rosenzweig Company to launch their first TV project Fortune Dane, and received a three-year distribution deal with Columbia Pictures Television.

== Personal life ==
While attending Montebello high school he was cheerleader. While a senior in college, he married JoAnne Lang, the stepdaughter of producer Aaron Rosenberg; they had three daughters before divorcing in 1978.

In 1979, Rosenzweig married Barbara Corday, a producer and writer for Cagney & Lacey; they divorced in 1990.

In 1991, he married actress Sharon Gless, star of Cagney & Lacey.
