= 1987 Laurence Olivier Awards =

Edition of London theatre awards

The 1987 Laurence Olivier Awards were held in 1987 in London celebrating excellence in West End theatre by the Society of London Theatre.

== Winners and nominees ==
Details of winners (in bold) and nominees, in each award category, per the Society of London Theatre.

Play of the Year	Musical of the Year
**Serious Money by Caryl Churchill – Royal Court**; A Lie of the Mind by Sam Shepard – Royal Court; Lettice and Lovage by Peter Shaffer – Globe; Sarcophagus by Vladimir Gubaryev – RSC at The Pit	**Follies – Shaftesbury**; Blues in the Night – Donmar Warehouse; Kiss Me, Kate – Old Vic; Up on the Roof – Donmar Warehouse
Comedy of the Year
**Three Men on a Horse by George Abbott and John Cecil Holm – National Theatre Cottesloe**; A Midsummer Night's Dream by William Shakespeare – Open Air; Groucho: A Life in Revue by Robert Fisher and Arthur Marx – Comedy; Twelfth Night by William Shakespeare – Donmar Warehouse
Actor of the Year	Actress of the Year
**Michael Gambon as Eddie Carbone in A View from the Bridge – National Theatre Cottesloe**; Tokusaburo Arashi as Medea in Medea – National Theatre Olivier; Hugh Quarshie as Jack Jefferson in The Great White Hope, as Belville in The Rover and as Arcite in The Two Noble Kinsmen – RSC at the Mermaid; Nicholas Woodeson as Mike Levine in Flight and as Bessmertny in Sarcophagus – RSC at the Barbican Pit	**Judi Dench as Cleopatra in Antony and Cleopatra – National Theatre Olivier**; Miranda Richardson as Beth in A Lie of the Mind – Royal Court; Maggie Smith as Halina Rodziewiczowna in Coming into Land – National Theatre Lyttelton and as Lettice Douffet in Lettice and Lovage – Globe; Juliet Stevenson as Yerma in Yerma – National Theatre Cottesloe
Outstanding Performance of the Year by an Actor in a Musical	Outstanding Performance of the Year by an Actress in a Musical
**John Bardon and Emil Wolk as First Gangster and Second Gangster in Kiss Me, Kate – Old Vic**; Bernard Alane as Pierre Fontaine in Bless the Bride – Sadler's Wells; Mark McGann as Scott in Up on the Roof – Donmar Warehouse; Gary Olsen as Keith in Up on the Roof – Donmar Warehouse	**Nichola McAuliffe as Lilli Vanessi/Kate Minola in Kiss Me, Kate – Old Vic**; Dee Dee Bridgewater as Billie Holiday in Lady Day – Donmar Warehouse; Julia McKenzie as Sally Durant Plummer in Follies – Shaftesbury; Carol Woods as Performer in Blues in the Night – Donmar Warehouse
Comedy Performance of the Year
**John Woodvine as Sir John Falstaff in The Henrys – Old Vic**; Frank Ferrante as Groucho Marx in Groucho: A Life in Revue – Comedy; Geoffrey Hutchings as Irwin in Three Men on a Horse – National Theatre Cottesloe; Les Marsden as Harpo Marx in Groucho: A Life in Revue – Comedy
Outstanding Performance of the Year in a Supporting Role	Most Promising Newcomer of the Year in Theatre
**Michael Bryant as Enobarbus in Antony and Cleopatra and as The Fool King Lear – National Theatre Olivier**; Robin Bailey as Vassily Ivanyich Bazarov in Fathers and Sons – National Theatre Lyttelton; Diane Bull as Louise Allington in Tons of Money – National Theatre Lyttelton; Sheila Reid as Morag in When I Was a Girl I Used to Scream and Shout – Whitehall	**Suzan Sylvester as Catherine in A View from the Bridge – National Theatre Cottesloe**; Rudi Davies as Sally in A Lie of the Mind – Royal Court and as Dorcas Bellboys A Penny for a Song – RSC at the Barbican; Nick Dear for writing The Art of Success – RSC at the Barbican Pit; Imogen Stubbs as Helena in The Rover and as the Gaoler's Daughter The Two Noble Kinsmen – RSC at the Mermaid
Director of the Year
**Declan Donnellan for Macbeth, The Cid and Twelfth Night – Donmar Warehouse**; Alan Ayckbourn for A View from the Bridge – National Theatre Cottesloe; Yukio Ninagawa for Macbeth – National Theatre Lyttelton and Medea – National Theatre Olivier; Peter Stein for The Hairy Ape – National Theatre Lyttelton
Designer of the Year
**Lucio Fanti for The Hairy Ape – National Theatre Lyttelton**; Bob Crowley for A Penny for a Song and Macbeth – RSC at the Barbican; William Dudley for Girlfriends – Playhouse, Kiss Me, Kate – Old Vic and Richard II – RSC at the Barbican; Kappa Senoh for Macbeth – National Theatre Lyttelton
Outstanding Achievement of the Year in Dance	Outstanding Achievement in Opera
**Trisha Brown for her season – Sadler's Wells**; The ensemble for their season, London Contemporary Dance Theatre – Sadler's Wells; Richard Alston for choreographing Dutiful Ducks and Pulcinella, Ballet Rambert – Sadler's Wells; Ichikawa Ennosuke in The Thousand Cherries of Yoshitsune – Sadler's Wells; Shards, Merce Cunningham Dance Company – Sadler's Wells	**Lady Macbeth of Mtsensk by English National Opera – London Coliseum**; Della Jones in The Barber of Seville, English National Opera – London Coliseum; Carlos Kleiber for conducting Otello, The Royal Opera – Royal Opera House; Marie McLaughlin in Le nozze di Figaro, The Royal Opera – Royal Opera House; Eva Randová in Jenůfa, The Royal Opera – Royal Opera House; Yuri Temirkanov for artistic directing, Kirov Opera Orchestra – Royal Opera House
Award for Outstanding Achievement
**Thelma Holt for producing, International Festival – National**; Ghosts, Young Vic – Wyndham's; Hampstead Theatre for overall high standard of work in 1987; Barry Humphries in Back with a Vengeance – Strand

== Productions with multiple nominations and awards ==
The following 17 productions received multiple nominations:

- 4: Kiss Me, Kate
- 3: A Lie of the Mind, A View from the Bridge, Groucho: A Life in Revue and Up on the Roof
- 2: A Penny for a Song, Antony and Cleopatra, Blues in the Night, Follies, Lettice and Lovage, Macbeth (Lyttelton), Medea, Sarcophagus, The Rover, The Two Noble Kinsmen, Three Men on a Horse and Twelfth Night

The following three productions received multiple awards:

- 2: A View from the Bridge, Antony and Cleopatra and Kiss Me, Kate

== See also ==
- 41st Tony Awards
