= Claude Allen (disambiguation) =

Claude Allen may refer to:

- Claude Allen (born 1960), American attorney and government official
- Claude Allen (athlete) (1885–1979), American track and field athlete and basketball coach

== See also ==
- Claude Allen Porter Turner (1869–1955), American structural engineer
- Claudia Allen (born 1954), American playwright
