= Nina Cortlandt =

- All My Children character
- Portrayed by: Taylor Miller (1979–84, 1986–2010); Heather Stanford (1984–85); Barbara Kearns (1985–86)
- Duration: 1979–89, 1995–96, 2010
- First appearance: 1979
- Last appearance: April 20, 2010
- Created by: Agnes Nixon
In-universe information
- Family: Cortlandt/Cooney
- Parents: Palmer Cortlandt; Daisy Murdoch
- Half-brothers: Ross Chandler; Andrew Cortlandt (adoptive); Peter Cortlandt
- Spouse: Cliff Warner (1980–83, 1986–87, 1989–); Matt Connolly (1987–89)
- Sons: Mickey Warner
- Adoptive sons: Bobby Warner
- Grandsons: Sam Grey (adoptive)
- Grandmothers: Myra Murdoch Sloane
- Aunts: Bess Cooney
- Nieces: Julie Rand Chandler (adoptive)
- First cousins: Will Cortlandt; Dixie Cooney; Lanie Cortlandt Rampal; Caleb Cortlandt
- Other relatives: JR Chandler; Kathy Martin; Asher Pike; AJ Chandler

Nina Cortlandt is a fictional character and one half of the Cliff and Nina supercouple on the long running ABC soap opera, All My Children. She has been most notably played by Taylor Miller who exited the role in 1996. Miller returned for a special cameo in 2010, following the death of her father Palmer Cortlandt. The character of Nina Cortlandt has been described as "troubled" and "beloved".

== Storylines ==
Nina Cortlandt was raised by her over-protective and controlling single father, Palmer. Palmer lied to Nina and told her that her mother died in childbirth. Palmer used Nina’s frail health and Juvenile-onset Diabetes as excuses for his “helicopter parenting.” He also concealed the fact that his housekeeper, Myra Murdock, was in fact her grandmother.

Nina was stressed by their move to Pine Valley and neglected her diabetic treatment regimen. At a party hosted in honor of the Cortlandts at the Tyler Estate, Nina fainted and was rushed to the hospital with acute appendicitis.

Nina woke up to see the handsome face of her doctor, Cliff Warner. It was love at first sight. They began dating despite Palmer’s disapproval of Cliff. Palmer considered Cliff unworthy of his precious daughter and was jealous of Nina’s love for him.

Palmer threw Nina a lavish 18th birthday party at Cortlandt Manor, with all Pine Valley’s elite society as guests.

Myra Murdock had phoned Nina's mother, Daisy, and informed her about the party. Daisy had fled Palmer's wrath when he discovered she was having an affair. Daisy grieved the loss of her daughter and stayed informed about her welfare via Myra. When Myra called to tell her Palmer was trying to interfere with Cliff and Nina, Daisy secretly moved to Pine Valley as “Monique Jonvil” to defend Nina’s romance. Myra conducted a seance where Nina was able to communicate with her "dead mother" who encouraged Nina to follow her heart. Daisy dressed up in a beautiful dress and mask for the costume ball and was able to see her daughter in person for the first time in years. Palmer sensed Daisy’s presence, pursued her to the stables and tried to flush her from hiding with his doberman guard dogs.

Nina and Cliff's love grew despite Palmer’s jealous plots against them. When Nina was diagnosed with diabetic retinopathy he lied and told her no treatment could stop her from going blind. Palmer convinced Nina she would only burden Cliff and she broke their engagement. Cliff, heartbroken, got drunk and was seduced by nurse Sybil Thorne, who was secretly in love with Cliff and seized this opportunity to try and make him forget Nina and fall for her.

Nina began to spend time with Palmer's employee, Sean Cudahy. They were taken hostage together in a sudden bank robbery. Deprived of her insulin, Nina fell into a diabetic coma. Sean and Brooke English's efforts helped foil the robbery and save Nina’s life.

Nina became friends with the “new stable hand” Monique Jonvil, who was of course her disguised mother, and Brooke English.

Nina learned her eye condition was treatable with laser surgery. She traveled to Baltimore with Palmer to save her sight. Her surgery was successful and she reunited with Cliff and resumed their engagement. Daisy/Monique helped her with wedding plans and had a secret Mother-of-the Bride moment when Nina shopped for her wedding gown. Nina and Cliff married in a lavish horse-and-carriage ceremony on the grounds of Cortland Manor with her best friends Brooke and Monique in her bridal party.

Married bliss was disrupted when Nurse Sybil Thorne revealed she was pregnant from Cliff’s drunken one night stand with her. Heartbroken, betrayed and angry, Nina fled back to Cortlandt Manor and filed for divorce.

Nina believed she stood no chance for happiness while Sybil held her unborn child as a bargaining chip. Monique convinced Nina to give Cliff another chance. Nina fell back into his arms. They planned to announce their reconciliation at a dinner party in Cortlandt Manor.

Sybil arrived and disrupted the happy party. After a heated argument with Nina, she went into labor. Cliff helped Sybil give birth to their son, Bobby Warner.

Nina watched Sybil fumble with life as a single mother. She went to Sybil and tried to convince her to allow them to adopt her child and provide him with the privileged life Sybil could never give him. Sybil threatened Nina and declared she would give her child away to a stranger if Nina refused to leave Cliff. Enraged by her demands, Cliff stormed off to Sybil's apartment. Instead Sybil was found dead.

Nina watched as Cliff fought for his innocence in court. His chances of acquittal seemed bleak until Monique entered the courtroom as an unexpected witness. Monique implicated Sean in Sybil's murder. When the prosecutor demanded her relationship to Cliff and Nina, Monique stunned the court with her revelation that she was Nina's mother. Nina stood up and fainted in the center aisle, shocked to know her mother had been alive all those years.

In prison, Sean implicated Palmer as mastermind of the entire plot. Palmer had been paying him and Sybil to keep Nina and Cliff apart. Nina rejected her father and hoped to build a relationship with the mother he had exiled from her life. When Palmer went missing in Center City, Nina realized she could not cut her father from her life forever.

Palmer was found alive as an amnesiac. Nina hoped for his recovery. At the end of the year, Nina reconciled with Cliff, called off the divorce, and they formally adopted Bobby.

While her father was away on his honeymoon with the much younger Donna Beck, Nina got a frantic call from the Cortlandt Electronics Board of Directors. She used part of her trust fund to solve their fiscal problem. When Palmer returned, he recognized his daughter's acumen for business and gave her an executive position in his company. Cliff did not want Nina working the long hours necessary for the job. He felt she was beginning to neglect Bobby.

Nina's coworker Steve Jacobi did not seem to understand that Nina was a married woman. At her Anniversary party, he planted a kiss on her. As much as Nina wanted to keep her relationship with Steve strictly business, things spiraled out of control. She began to fantasize about Steve while having sex with Cliff.

A storm hit Pine Valley while Steve and Nina were working at Cortlandt Manor. They were alone in the dark by the roaring fireplace. Nina succumbed to temptation and had sex with Steve.

Nina continued her torrid affair with Steve. Cliff went by his apartment one day to speak to Nina only to discover the lovers in a passionate embrace. Cliff filed for a quickie divorce. This time the divorce was finalized. Nina continued her life with Steve, but it was obvious his interest was waning. Nina wanted to talk marriage, while Steve was content with his life as is. Nina and Cliff continued their conflict and argued over Bobby's welfare. Cliff’s antagonism and resentment vanished when he believed that Nina had been killed in a helicopter crash. Cliff rejoiced in her survival, but was now entangled in a relationship with Devon Shepherd. Nina knew she did not love Steve. She moved back in with her father at Cortlandt Manor. Devon stepped aside and left town.

Nina and Cliff reconciled and were remarried by a justice of the peace.

Nina was mesmerized by the healing powers of a conman named Zach Grayson. Daisy tried to break Nina out of her trance, but her mental state weakened.

Zach drugged and raped Nina, while Cliff's sister, Linda Warner, took photos. Zach planned to blackmail Nina and threatened to show Cliff the photos. Nina turned to her mother for help. Nina was shocked when Daisy was discovered in Zach's apartment, standing over his dead body with a bloody knife.

Zach's many misdeeds were revealed during his murder trial. The strain on her mother, and the seeming end of her hopes for a future with Cliff, damaged Nina's psyche. Donna, who served as a key witness for trial, became the target for Nina’s aggression. Although Donna exonerated Daisy for Zach's murder, Nina focused hatred towards her. At Donna's wedding to Benny Sago, Nina came with a gun. She tried to shoot Donna, but luckily missed.

Nina finally broke from reality. She regressed to a state of adolescence, forgetting her life as a mother and Cliff's wife. It tore Palmer apart to commit his daughter to an asylum, but at least it kept her away from Cliff. Their second marriage ended in divorce.

Nina tried to re-piece her shattered life. She found solace in Benny's arms. Benny was still very much married to Donna. Nina was convinced she was in love. Before things got out of hand, Daisy and Nina left on a long cruise.

When Nina returned to Pine Valley, she began dating Matt Connolly. The couple ran into Cliff on Martha's Vineyard. Cliff's new fiancée, Dr. Amy Stone, was delayed in her arrival. Nina decided to keep Cliff company until Amy's train arrived. It was like no time had passed between the couple. When Nina saw Matt again, she knew their relationship was over.

Waiting for her train to take her back to Pine Valley, Nina was plagued with thoughts of Cliff, but she was not about to break up an engagement. At that very moment, she heard her name being called. Cliff was running on the platform, professing his love. Matt had told him that Nina still loved him. Nina got off the train as soon as she could, and the couple reunited.

That Christmas, in front of family and friends, Nina and Cliff married for the third time at the Tavern on the Green in New York City.

Nina anxiously awaited Cliff's return from a humanitarian mission in Hong Kong. But her world was turned upside down when news came that Cliff had gone to South America and was killed by rebels. Nina returned to Martha's Vineyard to mourne her husband. Matt followed her, afraid that she would have another break from reality. Nina wanted to be alone, but Matt refused to leave. In her moment of weakness, Nina and Matt shared a night of passionate sex. As Nina lay next to Matt, she realized she did not want to be alone. She proposed to Matt and they married the next morning.

Returning to Pine Valley, Nina got word that Cliff was alive. They had an emotional reunion where Cliff promised to never leave Nina again. Nina spent the night with Cliff. But, when Cliff learned about Nina's marriage to Matt, he rejected her. He wanted nothing to do with Nina anymore. She turned to Matt, hoping he would take her back.

Nina found out she pregnant. She realized both Matt and Cliff could have been the child's father. Still recovering from Cliff's rejection, Nina told Matt the child was his. Matt got a new job in Chicago, and the Connolly's left Pine Valley. Because Cliff had been declared dead, Nina's marriage to him was dissolved.

Nina returned to Pine Valley with a medical emergency. Her youngest son, Mikey Connolly, had fallen ill with a mysterious disease. She could not trust anyone else's diagnosis but Cliff's. Cliff was able to save Mikey, but in the process he uncovered something that Nina had feared all along: Mikey was Cliff's son, not Matt's. Upon learning the truth, Matt returned to Chicago without Nina.

Nina and Cliff were drawn to each other again. Only, Cliff was now in a relationship with Angie Hubbard. When Nina admitted to Angie that she still loved Cliff, Angie stepped aside. Nina and Cliff married for the fourth and final time on the Cortlandt Manor grounds. The Warners then left for Denver to start their lives anew.

Nina returns to Pine Valley for the Martin family housewarming. She had something important to talk about with her father, but decided to hold off after catching him in a heated argument with her mother.

Nina sent Bobby to live with Palmer. He had grown up to be quiet the handful. Nina hoped that Palmer could instill the discipline that he was lacking.

Upon learning that Bobby had impregnated Kesley Jefferson, Nina comes back to Pine Valley. Palmer was ready to kick Bobby out of Cortlandt Manor. But Nina did not want Palmer to lose his relationship with his grandson because of one bad decision. Nina reminded Bobby how much she loved him, and that she would always support any decision he made.

Nina returns in 2010 to mourn the death of her father, Palmer.
