= Groucho (disambiguation) =

Groucho Marx (1890–1977) was an American comedian

Groucho could also refer to:

- Groucho: A Life in Revue, a musical revue about the life of the comedian
- Groucho Club, a private arts club in London
- Groucho, a supporting character in the comic book series Dylan Dog
- Groucho, a transcription-inhibiting factor in genetics
- Groucho is an enemy which resembles Groucho Marx's face from the Japanese game Mother
- groucho-, a facetious 1993 proposal for an SI unit prefix standing for 10^{−30}

== See also ==
- Oscar the Grouch, Muppet character on Sesame Street TV program
