= List of Owen Marshall, Counselor at Law episodes =

This is a list of all episodes of the television series Owen Marshall, Counselor at Law.

== Series overview ==
Season	Episodes	Originally released	
Season	Episodes	First released	Last released
Television film		September 12, 1971	
1	23	September 16, 1971	March 2, 1972
2	23	September 14, 1972	March 14, 1973
3	23	September 12, 1973	April 6, 1974

== Television film (1971) ==
Title	Directed by	Written by	Original release date
A Pattern of Morality	Buzz Kulik	Story : David Victor; Story & teleplay : Jerry McNeely	September 12, 1971
Successful attorney Owen Marshall defends a hippie accused of murdering a housewife. Stars Vera Miles, William Shatner, Joseph Campanella, Tim Matheson, Dana Wynter and Bruce Davison.

== Episodes ==
=== Season 1 (1971–72) ===
No. overall	No. in season	Title	Directed by	Written by	Original release date
1	1	"Legacy of Fear"	David Lowell Rich	Michael Gleason	September 16, 1971
Marshall tries to help a friend whose reputation is on the line when an incident from twenty years ago results in a prison sentence. Lee Majors guest stars.
2	2	"A Lonely Stretch of Beach"	Unknown	Paul Schneider, Margaret Schneider	September 23, 1971
A respected sixth-grade teacher is accused of molesting one of his students. Cindy Eilbacher, Michael Tolan, Lorraine Gary and Anne Seymour guest star.
3	3	"Eulogy for a Wide Receiver"	Steven Spielberg	Richard M. Bluel	September 30, 1971
A football coach is accused of murder after one of his players dies from a drug overdose. Brad David, David Soul and John David Carson guest star.
4	4	"The Forest and the Trees"	Unknown	David Victor	October 7, 1971
A woman commits a crime to ensure her husband's success. Janet Margolin guest stars.
5	5	"Make No Mistake"	Unknown	Unknown	October 14, 1971
A doctor goes insane upon realizing he is not perfect. DeForest Kelley, Darrell Larson and Ross Martin guest star.
6	6	"Men Who Care: Part 2"	Marc Daniels, Arnold Laven	Jerry McNeely	October 21, 1971
Marshall defends a congressman accused of murdering his daughter's boyfriend, the girl being a patient of Dr. Marcus Welby. James Brolin and Robert Young (from Marcus Welby, M.D.) guest star.
7	7	"Shadow of a Name"	Harry Falk	John Wilder	October 28, 1971
Marshall clashes with a district attorney who is determined to win at any cost. Farrah Fawcett, Ed Begley Jr, Barry Sullivan and Tim Matheson guest star.
8	8	"Eighteen Years Next April"	Unknown	David Victor	November 4, 1971
Marshall reopens a murder case he helped win when was assistant DA. Alejandro Rey, Nancy Malone and John Hoyt guest star.
9	9	"Nothing Personal"	Lou Antonio	Unknown	November 11, 1971
A sports columnist implicates Jess in an eight-year-old football scandal. Gary Collins guest stars.
10	10	"The Baby Sitter"	Unknown	Unknown	November 18, 1971
A child's testimony could determine the outcome in the case of a teenage babysitter accused of attempted rape and murder. Barry Brown guest stars.
11	11	"Burden of Proof"	Harry Falk	William Driskill	December 2, 1971
A man (Lawrence Pressman) is unable to prove he was home alone when his car killed a woman. Farrah Fawcett, Susan Sarandon and Shelley Fabares guest star.
12	12	"Until Proven Innocent"	Walter Doniger	Pat Fielder	December 9, 1971
A student is charged with shoplifting after unwittingly walking out of a store with a valuable item. Lou Frizzell, Randolph Mantooth and Lindsay Wagner guest star.
13	13	"Voice from a Nightmare"	Unknown	Unknown	December 16, 1971
An auto-accident lawsuit may be connected to a criminal assault case. Will Geer and William Schallert guest star.
14	14	"The Triangle"	David Lowell Rich	William Driskill	December 30, 1971
A cop's obsession with his work leads to tragedy for him, his wife and her lover. Stephen Brooks, Donna Mills and Russell Johnson guest star.
15	15	"Warlock at Mach 3"	Unknown	Jerome Ross, Jerry McNeely	January 6, 1972
An Air Force colonel is charged with negligence when a test pilot under his command is killed. Robert Hogan and Pat Crowley guest star.
16	16	"8 Cents' Worth of Protection"	Harry Falk	Michael Gleason	January 13, 1972
Police rush to a home after a report of a shooting and find a woman dead and her husband wounded. He is suffering a traumatic loss of memory but wants to plead guilty for his wife's murder. Vic Morrow and Dick Sargent guest star.
17	17	"Run, Carol, Run"	Unknown	Unknown	January 20, 1972
A young widow is unwilling to reveal the secret that is preventing her from keeping custody of her child. Lane Bradbury and Jeanne Crain guest star.
18	18	"Victim in Shadows"	Unknown	Unknown	January 27, 1972
A psychotic rapist victimizes the wives of three Army officers in Vietnam. Ricky Nelson and Stefanie Powers guest star.
19	19	"Shine a Light on Me"	Harry Falk	Paul Schneider, Margaret Schneider	February 3, 1972
A boxer-turned-singer is charged with beating up a heckler. Because he was a former boxer, the musician is charged with wielding a deadly weapon. He asks Owen to mount his defense. James Brolin, Sian Barbara Allen and Jackie Coogan guest star.
20	20	"The Color of Respect"	Unknown	Unknown	February 10, 1972
Frieda (Joan Darling), who has always looked up to her sister, asks Marshall to defend her when she is accused of perjury for testimony during a civil case. She is also disillusioned when her sister admits to an affair with her married employer. Richard Deacon and Edward Andrews guest star.
21	21	"Smiles from Yesterday"	Lou Antonio	John McGreevey	February 17, 1972
A singer is accused of plagiarizing the only song she ever wrote. Peggy Lee and Hoagy Carmichael guest star.
22	22	"A Question of Degree"	Unknown	Unknown	February 24, 1972
A court judge is accused of profiting from a favorable decision for a company in which he owned stock. Pat Hingle, Louise Latham and Lloyd Nolan guest star.
23	23	"Murder in the Abstract"	Unknown	Unknown	March 2, 1972
A woman is charged with complicity in the death of her boyfriend who was shot while trying to hold up a store. Pat Harrington Jr., Fritz Weaver and Karen Valentine guest star.

=== Season 2 (1972–73) ===
No. overall	No. in season	Title	Directed by	Written by	Original release date
24	1	"Words of Summer"	Harry Falk	Edward DeBlasio	September 14, 1972
A teen-age diving student accuses a champion of lesbian seduction. Barbara Rush and Meredith Baxter guest star.
25	2	"Lines from an Angry Book"	Lou Antonio	Unknown	September 21, 1972
A college professor is accused of the murder of a student she was having an affair. A key ingredient in Owen Marshall's defense: the victim's diary. Andrew Duggan and Kim Hunter guest star.
26	3	"Libel Is a Dirty Word"	Unknown	David Victor	September 28, 1972
Owen takes a controversial case when a handsome pastor decides to sue for libel. Reverend Shaw (John Davidson), finds himself the target of gossip ranging from wife swapping to skinny dipping. To save his career and reputation he needs Marshall to clear him. Sharon Gless and William Schallert guest star.
27	4	"Hour of Judgment"	Unknown	Unknown	October 5, 1972
Marshall exposes a murderer in a courtroom full of suspects. Lew Ayres, Paul Burke, Kaz Garas and Mike Farrell guest star
28	5	"Journey Through Limbo"	Unknown	Edward DeBlasio, Michael Gleason	October 12, 1972
An assistant DA's son is accused of murder. Michael Brandon and Sheila Larken guest star.
29	6	"The Trouble with Ralph"	E.W. Swackhamer	Unknown	October 19, 1972
Circumstantial evidence traps a suspect during a skyjacking. Paul Carr, Joel Fabiani and Arlene Golonka guest star.
30	7	"Five Will Get You Six"	Harry Falk	Shimon Wincelberg	October 26, 1972
An architect ends up on trial for murder after borrowing a lot of money from a loan shark. William Shatner, Sandra Smith and Sam Jaffe guest star.
31	8	"Who Saw Him Die?"	Unknown	Unknown	November 2, 1972
Twelve witnesses claim to have seen Marshall's client commit a murder, while a TV station has the whole thing on film. Dana Elcar and Ed Nelson guest star.
32	9	"Love Child"	Leon Benson	Peter S. Fischer	November 9, 1972
A malevolent woman uses her illegitimate baby to get a husband. Patty Duke, David Soul, Leif Erickson and Lynne Marta guest star.
33	10	"Charlie Gave Me Your Number"	Daniel Haller	Richard Carlson	November 16, 1972
A former actress sues gossip sheets for claims that she was once a call girl. Diana Muldaur guest stars.
34	11	"The First Day of Your Life"	Lou Antonio	Pat Fielder	November 30, 1972
A philosophy professor is charged with murder in the death of his newborn son. The infant, born with disabilities, was found with his ventilator turned off. Owen and his team must fashion a defense. Melissa Murphy, Wayne Newton and Madeleine Sherwood guest star.
35	12	"Starting Over Again"	James Sheldon	Richard E. Peck	December 7, 1972
A disc jockey murders his wife and has framed a popular sportscaster for the crime. The husband has given himself an electronic alibi leaving Owen and his team a tough defense. Tab Hunter and James Stacy guest star.
36	13	"A Piece of God"	Unknown	Unknown	December 14, 1972
A father is on trial for arson, murder and perjury to save his mentally disabled son. Joseph Bottoms and Barry Nelson guest star.
37	14	"Sigh No More, Lady"	James Sheldon	John McGreevey	December 21, 1972
Owen takes on the case of a sex researcher who is being accused of seducing one of his subjects. Roger C. Carmel, Glenn Corbett, Nancy Malone and Joan Hotchkis guest star.
38	15	"An Often and Familiar Ghost"	John Badham	Edward J. Lakso	January 4, 1973
Marshall must prove that a cop has been framed for murder. Louis Gossett Jr., Irene Tsu and John Milford guest star.
39	16	"Sometimes Tough Is Good"	Unknown	Unknown	January 17, 1973
Marshall reopens a convicted sex offender's case. Martine Bartlett, Eduard Franz, Michael Parks and Beverly Garland guest star.
40	17	"Seed of Doubt"	Lou Antonio	George F. Slavin	January 24, 1973
Owen's niece (Jess Walton) is in need of legal help—her own husband (Martin Sheen) is suing her for adultery, claiming that since she is pregnant by artificial insemination, she has in fact cheated on him.
41	18	"Requiem for Young Lovers"	Unknown	Unknown	January 31, 1973
Teenage lovers are charged with murdering the girl's mother on their elopement eve, where the boy suddenly accuses the girl in court. John David Carson, Gloria DeHaven and Celia Lovsky guest star.
42	19	"Why Is a Crooked Letter"	Unknown	Unknown	February 7, 1973
A draft dodger is accused of murdering his girl friend's father. Tim Matheson, Peter Breck and Jamie Smith-Jackson guest star.
43	20	"They've Got to Blame Somebody"	Daniel Haller	Peter S. Fischer	February 14, 1973
A camp bus driver is charged with vehicular manslaughter following a tragic crash. Don Stroud, Robert Hogan and Leslie Charleson guest star.
44	21	"Some People in a Park"	Jerry McNeely	Jerry McNeely	February 21, 1973
A meeting between lovers in a park leads to murder. Brooke Bundy and Roger Davis guest star.
45	22	"Final Semester"	Harry Falk	Robert Van Scoyk	March 7, 1973
A basketball star is accused of murdering a professor. O. J. Simpson, Diana Hyland and Jennifer Salt guest star.
46	23	"A Girl Named Tham"	Lou Antonio	Robert Malcolm Young	March 14, 1973
Owen and Jess take up the case of a Vietnam veteran accused of rape. The soldier had been discharged from the military for psychiatric disorders which the attorneys intend to use as a defense. Robert Urich, Kay Lenz and Richard Carlson guest star.

=== Season 3 (1973–74) ===
No. overall	No. in season	Title	Directed by	Written by	Original release date
47	1	"A Lesson in Loving"	Unknown	David Victor	September 12, 1973
A high school teacher is accused of murdering the teacher with whom he had an affair. Nina Foch, Diana Muldaur and Kaz Garas guest star.
48	2	"Once a Lion"	Unknown	Unknown	September 19, 1973
A retired legal wizard loses his powers as he defends a murder suspect. Ralph Bellamy and Erik Estrada guest star.
49	3	"The Pool House"	James Sheldon	Edward DeBlasio	September 26, 1973
A teenager is accused of murdering his girlfriend just because she broke up with him. Mark Hamill, Sheree North and Pat Harrington Jr. guest star
50	4	"Sweet Harvest"	Unknown	Unknown	October 3, 1973
An ex-convict and his sister-in-law engage in a bitter custody battle for his 7-year-old son. Sharon Gless, Andrew Duggan, Dack Rambo and Inga Swenson guest star.
51	5	"'N' Is for Nightmare"	Daniel Haller	Mark Weingart	October 17, 1973
A newly engaged couple in their 40s find their happiness short lived. Her teenage daughter is violated and killed, with the fiancé as the chief suspect. Owen takes on the seemingly hopeless case when a Shakespearean quote changes the investigation. Vera Miles, Reni Santoni and Eric Braeden guest star.
52	6	"The Camerons Are a Special Clan"	Jerry McNeely	Jerry McNeely	October 24, 1973
A rock-music star is accused of mercy-killing his terminally-ill mother. John Denver, Mike Farrell, Brooke Bundy, Micky Dolenz and Reni Santoni guest star.
53	7	"Poor Children of Eve"	Unknown	Unknown	October 31, 1973
Attorney Owen Marshall agrees to defend a priest who is arrested for killing a girl he once dated. Marshall believes most of the evidence is circumstantial except for an eyewitness who declares she saw the accused at the scene of the crime. Bridget Hanley, David Barton, Jeff Corey and Richard Carlson guest star.
54	8	"The Sin of Susan Gentry"	Unknown	Unknown	November 7, 1973
Marshall attempts to free a girl from a mental hospital where her parents had her committed. Martha Scott, June Dayton and Elayne Heilveil guest star.
55	9	"Child of Wednesday"	Leo Penn	Jerry McNeely	November 28, 1973
The son in a custody battle wants to live with his father, but the court may not let him when they hear the mother's vengeful accusation. Pat Boone and Nancy Malone guest star.
56	10	"Snatches of a Crazy Song"	Unknown	Unknown	December 5, 1973
A widow claims that an invasion of her husband's privacy led him to suicide. Mariette Hartley, Madlyn Rhue and Tom Selleck guest star.
57	11	"The Prowler"	Harry Falk	Edward DeBlasio	December 12, 1973
The police insist that a woman was aware that the prowler she shot was her own husband. Lawrence Pressman, Donna Mills and Michelle Phillips guest star.
58	12	"The Second Victim"	Unknown	Unknown	December 19, 1973
The mother of a convicted killer believes her son's young lawyer blew the case on purpose. Sada Thompson and Paul Comi guest star.
59	13	"Etude for a Kidnapper"	Unknown	Unknown	January 2, 1974
A young hitchhiker, after accepting a ride, agrees to deliver a briefcase for the man. But the favor leads to the young man being charged with kidnapping and murder. It doesn't add up to Owen so he agrees to take the case. Bethel Leslie and Dick Sargent guest star.
60	14	"House of Friends"	James Sheldon	Edward DeBlasio	January 19, 1974
Dr. Tannen, who runs a private clinic, is incensed when a young patient of his dies because a larger hospital wouldn't accept him, and publicly blames the other hospital for the boy's death. This makes him the defendant of a libel suit, for which he hires his friend Owen to defend him. David Hartman, Joyce Van Patten and Kathleen Quinlan guest star.
61	15	"The Attacker"	Unknown	Unknown	January 26, 1974
A mute gardener is accused of rape. Clu Gulager and Pat Harrington Jr. guest star.
62	16	"A Foreigner Among Us"	Unknown	Unknown	February 2, 1974
A small-town mayor seeks to censor a bookstore's obscene inventory. Darren McGavin, Ricky Nelson and Leslie Charleson guest star.
63	17	"A Killer with a Badge"	James Sheldon	Story by : Michael McTaggert; Teleplay by : Michael McTaggert & William Driskill	February 9, 1974
A wealthy father wants a policeman charged with murder after the officer kills the rich man's son. Lee Majors, Patricia Smith, Scott Jacoby, Reni Santoni and Tim Matheson guest star.
64	18	"The Sterilization of Judy Simpson"	Daniel Haller	William Driskill	February 16, 1974
A mentally disabled teen's mother gives legal consent to a sterilization operation, but the girl doesn't want it. David Soul and Eve Arden guest star.
65	19	"The Break-In"	Unknown	David Victor	March 2, 1974
A student is killed in his own home by a policeman looking for stolen property. Christopher George, Sheila Larken and Heather Menzies guest star.
66	20	"I've Promised You a Father: Part 2"	Leo Penn	Richard Fielder	March 9, 1974
Marshall defends Dr. Steve Kiley (James Brolin), colleague of Dr. Marcus Welby (Robert Young), in a paternity suit. Kim Darby and Lynda Day George guest star.
67	21	"To Keep and Bear Arms"	Unknown	Unknown	March 23, 1974
A passenger is left paralyzed by a bullet after a bus driver uses a gun to foil a robbery. Paul Burke and Barbara Anderson guest star.
68	22	"The Desertion of Keith Ryder"	Harry Falk	Robert Malcolm Young	March 30, 1974
An old friend of Owen's (Macdonald Carey) asks him to defend his son (Randolph Mantooth) in a military court for charges of Desertion and assault on a Non-commissioned Officer. Jane Wyman, Henry Jones and Regis Toomey guest star.
69	23	"The Ghost of Buzz Stevens"	Unknown	Unknown	April 6, 1974
A reporter is put in jail for refusing to reveal the source of a story about drugs in the record industry. Gary Crosby and Susan Strasberg guest star.
