= Christine Belford =

American actress

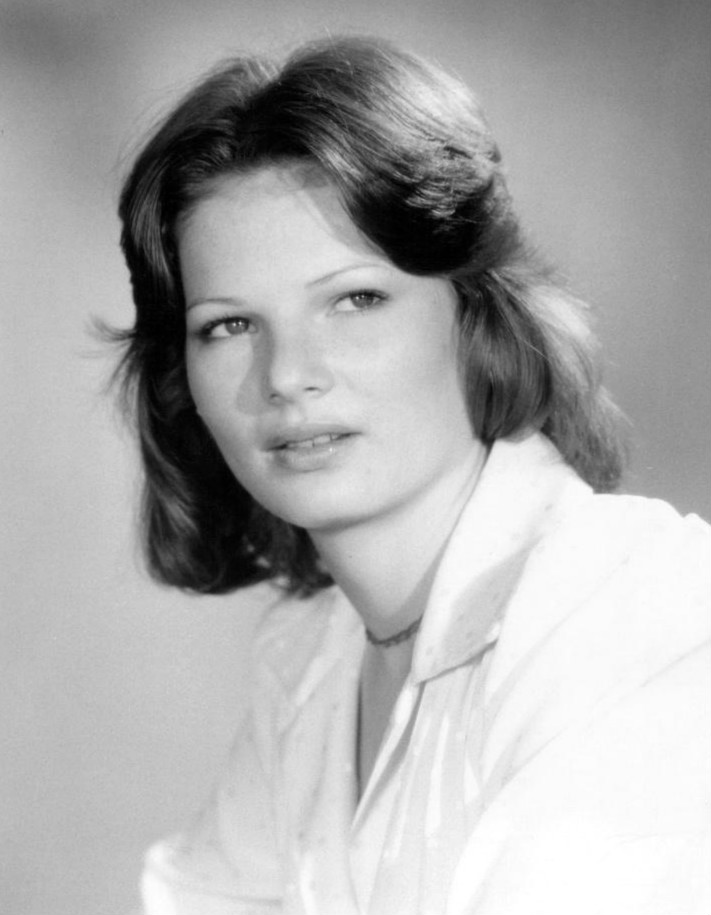
- Belford in 1973
- Born: Christine Riley; 1948 or 1949 (age 77–78); Amityville, New York, U.S.
- Other name: Christina Belford
- Education: Hofstra University
- Occupation: Actress
- Years active: 1971–2007
- Spouse: Nicholas Pryor (m. 1993; died 2024)

Christine Belford (born Christine Riley; 1948 or 1949) is an American former television and film actress. She has sometimes been credited as Christina Belford.

== Early life ==
Christine Riley was born in 1948 or 1949 in Amityville, Long Island, New York to Joseph J. Riley and Mary Belford Riley (née Wilson; later Malone), who later divorced. She has a brother, Terry, and a sister, Shawn. The family once lived at 112 Ocean Avenue, the location that later became famous as the setting of The Amityville Horror, for about five years from age 11 until age 16. As a young child and teenager on Long Island, she was active in equestrian trials and won many horsemanship awards. "She was enrolled at the best schools and joined the best swimming and yachting clubs on Long Island." After graduating from high school in 1966, she attended Hofstra University, initially interested in pursuing a career in psychiatry. However, the classwork she did with Joseph Leon, the head of the drama department, inspired her to become an actress.

In 1970, after college she moved to New York City and did some modeling work but no acting. Additionally, she said, "In order to keep a roof over my head and to eat, I took any job I could get. I was a waitress, a bar maid, and I also drove an ice truck." For both personal and professional reasons, she moved to Los Angeles near the end of 1970. There, at the suggestion of a friend, actress Carrie Snodgress, she auditioned at Universal Pictures, performing a scene from the film The Country Girl for the head of talent, Monique James. Belford then received a seven-year acting contract from Universal Pictures.

== Career ==
Her first appearance on television was as an extra on the Vince Edwards series Matt Lincoln. Her first credited appearance on television was in the NBC television movie Vanished in 1971. She played insurance investigator Carlie Kirkland in the pilot and the second season (1972–74) of Banacek. In 1978, she played a New York City policewoman in the four hour TV movie To Kill a Cop. She appeared in the 1980 TV-movie The Gambler with Kenny Rogers and also played Ricky Stratton's mother, Evelyn on Silver Spoons and Jackie on Empire.

She appeared in guest roles on many popular television shows of the 1970s, 1980s, and 1990s, including Ironside; Banacek; Mannix; Barnaby Jones; Owen Marshall, Counselor at Law; The Six Million Dollar Man; CHiPs; The Greatest American Hero; Wonder Woman; Magnum, P.I.; Hart to Hart; The Incredible Hulk; Family Ties; The Golden Girls; Blossom; Beverly Hills, 90210; Battlestar Galactica (as one of the prison-barge inmates recruited to destroy "The Gun On Ice Planet Zero"); The Paper Chase: The Television Series; My Two Dads; Night Court (the 1992 episode "Opportunity Knock Knocks", where she was credited as Christina Belford); Harry O; Murder, She Wrote; Diagnosis: Murder and Quincy, M.E. episode "Holding Pattern".

One television role was the December 21, 1980 CHiPs episode "Wheels of Justice", where she played the character Denise Holmes; an attractive, suffering, and sympathetic figure wife of an arrogant and habitual drunk driver. Denise dearly loved and would do anything to protect her husband, including lying to an officer of the law as well as under oath in court. She ultimately failed to hold him accountable for his destructive behavior until it was too late. Her husband drunkenly tried to evade a CHP pursuit, causing an accident. Denise was thrown from the Holmes' Cadillac and fatally landed on her neck.

She appeared in the episode "Devil Pack" from the 1977 series Quinn Martin's Tales of the Unexpected (known in the United Kingdom as Twist in the Tale), as well as in various television films through the years. She played on Dynasty as the nurse for Fallon's baby at the end of Season 2 and Season 3. In 1983, she co-hosted, in Los Angeles, with Steve Edwards, Cathy Kronkite, and Ruth Batchelor, an unsuccessful pilot for a daytime-magazine series, Personal & Confidential, over five days (August 1–5, 1983).

Her last feature film credit was The Ladies Club (1986), while her last television credit was the TV movie Ruffian (2007).

== Personal life ==
Belford became a vegetarian when she moved from the East Coast to Los Angeles although later added fish and poultry to her diet. She was married to actor Nicholas Pryor from July 1993 until his death in October 2024.

== Filmography ==
=== Film ===
- Pocket Money (1972) as Adelita
- The Groundstar Conspiracy (1972) as Nicole Devon
- Christine (1983) as Regina Cunningham
- The Ladies Club (1986) as Dr. Constance Lewis

=== Television ===
- 1970–74 Marcus Welby, M.D. ...Sandy / Phyllis Dalton / Lolly
- 1971 Ironside ...Sue Broderick
- 1971 Matt Lincoln
- 1971 Vanished (TV movie) as Gretchen Greer
- 1971–72 Owen Marshall, Counselor at Law ...Jeanine Michaels / Karen Slater
- 1972 Mannix ...Alison Bramante
- 1972 Alias Smith and Jones ...Ellie Alcott
- 1972 Cool Million ...Adrienne / Marcella Pascal
- 1972 The Sixth Sense ...Anna Harris
- 1972–74 Banacek ...Carlie Kirkland
- 1973 Jigsaw ...Gale Parker
- 1973 Cannon ...Anne Grainger
- 1973–79 Barnaby Jones ...Virginia Kirkland / Louise Brenner / Eleanor Devers
- 1974 The Manhunter ...Cynthia Browning
- 1974 Doc Elliot ...Joy Neimeyer
- 1974 The Six Million Dollar Man ...Lt. Colby
- 1974–82 Insight ...Karen / Kate / Kay /
- 1975 Harry O ...Karen Nesbitt
- 1975 Medical Story ...Hope
- 1975 Police Story ...Carrie
- 1975 Kate McShane ...Charlotte Randall Chase
- 1976 The Million Dollar Rip-Off (TV movie) as Lil
- 1976 Wonder Woman ...Baroness Paula Von Gunther
- 1977 Quincy, M.E. ...Sonya
- 1977 Quinn Martin's Tales of the Unexpected ...Ann Colby
- 1977 Most Wanted ...Jennifer Haron
- 1978 The White Shadow ...Dr. Evelyn Crawford
- 1978 Battlestar Galactica ...Leda
- 1978 To Kill a Cop (TV movie) as Agnes Cusack
- 1979 Hart to Hart ...Nikki Stephanos
- 1979 Dear Detective
- 1979 Married: The First Year ...Emily Gorey
- 1979 High Midnight (TV movie) as Sgt. Liz Spencer
- 1979 The Paper Chase ...Chris Carlyle
- 1979–81 The Incredible Hulk ...Leigh Gamble / Linda Calahan
- 1980 Kenny Rogers as The Gambler (TV movie) as Eliza
- 1980 Beyond Westworld ...Dianna Lionstar
- 1980 Desperate Voyage (TV movie)
- 1980 CHiPs ...Denise
- 1981 Magnum, P.I. ...Adelaide Malone
- 1981 Nero Wolfe ...Melanie Davidson
- 1981–83 The Greatest American Hero ...Dotty Parker / Sheila Redman, the Spirit
- 1982 Today's F.B.I. ...Leslie
- 1982 Cagney & Lacey ...Theresa
- 1982 The Neighborhood (TV movie) as Meg Penner
- 1982 Dynasty ...Susan Farragut
- 1982–87 Silver Spoons ...Evelyn Stratton / Evelyn Stratton Whiting
- 1983 It's Not Easy
- 1983 Sparkling Cyanide (TV movie) as Rosemary Barton
- 1983 The Love Boat Fall Preview Special ...Herself
- 1983 Hart to Hart ...Victoria Dickenson
- 1983–84 Fantasy Island ...Melanie Swan / Marion Robertson
- 1984–93 Murder, She Wrote ...Missy Stevens / Maude Paulson Winslow / Fiona Keeler
- 1984 100 Centre Street (TV movie) as Fran Felt
- 1984 Breakaway ...Herself
- 1984 Empire ...Jackie Willow
- 1984 Goodnight, Beantown ...Allison
- 1986 Mr. and Mrs. Ryan (TV movie) as Margo Slater
- 1986 The Golden Girls ...Kirsten Nylund Adams
- 1986 Family Ties ...Victoria Hurstenberg
- 1986–87 Outlaws ...Maggie Randall
- 1987 ABC Afterschool Special ...Dr. Louise Warner
- 1988 Murphy's Law ...Claudia Slocum
- 1988 My Two Dads ...Myra Young
- 1989 Freddy's Nightmares ...Dr. Weiss
- 1989 Living Dolls ...Kitty
- 1989 Empty Nest ...Fran
- 1989 L.A. Law ...Lily White
- 1990 Yes, Virginia ... (TV Short)
- 1990 Dragnet ...Jean Reynolds
- 1991 The Woman Who Sinned (TV movie) as Randy Emerson
- 1991 Who's the Boss? ...Ida Davis
- 1991–98 Beverly Hills, 90210 ...Samantha Sanders
- 1992 Mann & Machine ...Rose
- 1992 Night Court ...Clare Monroe
- 1993 Blossom ...Nancy
- 1993 Step by Step ...Eileen Donovan
- 1994 Diagnosis Murder ...Emily Bissell
- 1999 The Wild Thornberrys ...Whale (voice)
- 2007 Ruffian (TV movie) as Barbara Janney
