= Cliff Warner and Nina Cortlandt =

Cliff Warner
- All My Children character
- Portrayed by: Peter Bergman
- Duration: 1979–89
- First appearance: May 24, 1979
- Last appearance: 1989
- Created by: Agnes Nixon
In-universe information
- Occupation: Physician
- Siblings: Linda Warner
- Spouse: Nina Cortlandt (1980–1983, 1986–1987, 1989–present)
- Children: Bobby Warner; Michael Warner
- Grandchildren: Samuel Grey

Cliff and Nina Warner (Peter Bergman and Taylor Miller).

Clifford "Cliff" Warner and Nina Cortlandt are fictional characters and a supercouple from the 1980s Cliff and Nina storyline on the American daytime drama All My Children. Cliff was portrayed by Peter Bergman, and Nina was portrayed by Taylor Miller.

The two characters were in a popular on-again/off-again relationship that spanned the entire decade, becoming the soap's first ever supercouple. Within the story, although the couple split up numerous times, they end up marrying one another in four separate ceremonies, one being titled as "the most sumptuous wedding seen on daytime television up to that date". For over twenty years, the pairing held the record for the most marriages to each other on a soap opera, at four.

Nina Cortlandt Warner
- All My Children character
- Portrayed by: Taylor Miller (1979–84, 1986–2010); Heather Standford (1984–85); Barbara Kearns (1985–86)
- Duration: 1979–89, 1995–96, 2010
- First appearance: 1979
- Last appearance: April 20, 2010
- Created by: Agnes Nixon
In-universe information
- Parents: Palmer Cortlandt; Daisy Murdoch
- Siblings: Ross Chandler; Andrew Preston; Pete Cortlandt
- Spouse: Cliff Warner (1980–81, 1981–83, 1986–87, 1989—); Matt Connolly (1987–89)
- Children: Bobby Warner (adoptive); Michael Warner
- Grandchildren: Samuel Grey
- Grandparents: Myra Murdoch Sloane
- Aunts and uncles: Bess Cooney
- Nieces and nephews: Julie Rand Chandler
- First cousins: Lanie Cortlandt Rampal; Will Cortlandt; Dixie Cooney; Caleb Cortlandt
- Other relatives: J.R. Chandler; Kathy Martin; Adam Chandler III

== Storyline ==
Dr. Cliff Warner and Nina Cortlandt meet at Pine Valley Hospital where Nina is recovering from an appendectomy. They begin a fairytale romance and fall madly in love. Nina's father, Palmer Cortlandt (James Mitchell), disapproves of their relationship, and plots to break them up. Nina, who is diabetic, develops retinopathy, which will make her go blind. Palmer refuses to let her know that there is a cure. Nina break up with Cliff, who she had agreed to marry, in order to not be a burden to him. Eventually, Cliff finds out about Nina's condition, and is able to get her treatment. They reconcile and decide to go ahead with their wedding plans. In the meantime, Nina meets ne'er-do-well, Sean Cudahy (Alan Dysert), who works with Palmer to get Nina away from Cliff.

Nurse Sybil Thorne (Linda Gibboney) plots to get Cliff all to herself. Cliff is vulnerable after his split with Nina and has sex with Sybil, who ends up pregnant with his child. She alerts him to the fact just before his wedding to Nina in November 1980. Despite knowing this could tear them apart, Cliff marries Nina in a fairytale wedding. Sybil gives birth to a boy named Bobby. When Nina finds out the baby's parentage from Sybil, she files for divorce. Sybil is found murdered, and Cliff is arrested, but it is later found that Sean Cudahy is the killer. During the trial, it was revealed that Nina's friend, stable worker Monique Jonvil (Gillian Spencer), was actually the presumed-dead Daisy Cortlandt, Palmer Cortlandt's ex-wife and Nina's mother.

Cliff and Nina reconcile before the divorce is finalized. Nina happily adopts Bobby and they settle into domestic bliss. Nina starts a secretarial job with Steve Jacobi (Dack Rambo), who is smitten with her. She battles with her attraction to him in an attempt to make her marriage to Cliff work. Nina is at Cortlandt Manor working with Steve one night when a thunderstorm causes a power outage. Despite her attempts to stay true to her husband, Nina and Steve have sex that evening.

From then on, Nina becomes uninterested in Cliff and dreams about her sexual encounter with Steve, which leads to more sex between the two. One day, Cliff catches Nina, but instead of making a fuss, he sneaks away. That evening, he informs Nina of what he knows and demands that they divorce. This is their first divorce.

Before going away on an assignment, Steve persuades Nina to go away with him so they can have some time alone. Their plane crashes, and everyone in Pine Valley, including Cliff, has assumed Nina is dead. She resurfaces unscathed in 1983, but Steve is very badly injured.

Nina tells Cliff that Kim McGuire, an associate of Steve's, has died, and she blames herself because Cliff was close with Kim. When Nina says that she should have died in the plane crash, Cliff takes her in an embrace and tells her, "I just thank God you're alive!" Cliff's new girlfriend, Devon McFadden (Tricia Pursley), sees the exchange of affection and runs off. Eventually, with her mother Ellen Dalton's (Kathleen Noone) urging, she leaves town to start afresh without Cliff.

Nina and Steve separate, but instead of being involved with Nina, Cliff becomes involved with Dr. Amy Stone (Catherine Christianson). When Dr. Stone is seriously injured by a drunk driver, Cliff is the only surgeon available to operate on her. He cannot save her, and blames himself. However, Nina is there to pick up the pieces. They marry for the second time by a justice of the peace.

Taylor Miller leaves the role of Nina shortly after that. Zach Grayson befriends Nina, and Liza Colby, who is now Cliff's intern, tries to seduce Cliff. Liza does not succeed. Nina resists Zach as well, however Cliff's sister Linda plots with Zach to break up Cliff and Nina. They drug Nina and make it look like Nina is having an affair with Zach. They photograph it as well. Linda and Zach are found dead. It is believed that Zach killed Linda, but then Daisy killed Zach. Daisy is found guilty, but is later cleared when Donna remembers that it was Marion Colby who had killed Zach. The strain of all of this causes Nina to have a mental breakdown. Sometime during all of this, Cliff and Nina divorce for the second time.

Nina is released from the sanitarium. After a failed relationship with Benny Sago, she begins dating Matt Connolly (Michael Tylo). They take a vacation to Martha's Vineyard and they run into Cliff. Matt tells Cliff that Nina is still in love with him. Nina has already boarded a train back to Pine Valley. Cliff manages to get to Nina before the train departs and declares his love for her. In December 1986, they marry for the third time in a lavish ceremony in Tavern on the Green in New York City.

In 1987, Cliff becomes involved in an international rescue for a war-torn South American nation. He is reported killed while attempting to deliver medicine. Nina goes to Martha's Vineyard to grieve. Matt Connolly follows her and they end up having sex. Nina, afraid of being alone, asks Matt to marry her, which he does. Nina tries to settle into her new life with Matt, but still desperately misses her beloved Cliff.

Nina is stunned when Cliff turns up alive; it turns out he had only been held prisoner. They are overcome with emotion and have a wild night of passionate sex. When he finds out that Nina married Matt, he leaves her. When Nina finds out she is pregnant, a paternity issue arises. Believing her life with Cliff is over, Nina says Matt is the father and they move to Chicago.

Months later, Cliff is proven to be the biological father of the child, Michael. By this time, Cliff is engaged to his doctor colleague, Angie Hubbard (Debbi Morgan). Nina returns to Pine Valley and Angie instantly feels threatened. For good reason, it turned out, as in the end, Cliff and Nina realize they are meant to be. The Warners marry for a fourth time and leave town for a new life in Denver, Colorado.

Nina briefly returned to Pine Valley as part of All My Children's 25th anniversary from January 3 through January 6, 1995, also for the 40th anniversary celebration, which aired on January 5, 2010, and again on April 20, 2010, with her mother Daisy (Gillian Spencer) for Palmer's funeral.

== Reception and impact ==
Cliff and Nina's romance enthralled viewers. Chicago Sun-Times, stated, "Nina's wedding to Cliff Warner is regarded as one of daytime's most-watched moments." The pairing is considered to be one of soap opera's most notable romances. Within a year, Taylor Miller had been voted 'Most Promising Newcomer' by Soap Opera Digest magazine and enjoyed publicized attention as part of the couple. Following on the success of the Luke and Laura storyline on General Hospital, the writing staff at All My Children heavily promoted the star-crossed romance. Soap Opera Digest noted Cliff and Nina as one of daytime's classic supercouples. Soapdom.com listed Cliff and Nina's love story twice in their article The Exciting 80's.

Victory Gardens Theater, when announcing their world premiere of ensemble member Claudia Allen's play Unspoken Prayers, featuring Taylor Miller, stated that Miller "reached into the hearts of millions of viewers as Nina, and to this day, long after she is a daily presence on the show, she is constantly stopped on the street, asked how she is, and engaged in 'best friend' conversations."

Public fascination with Cliff and Nina's romance was theorized by the All American Speaker's Bureau. The bureau commented on Bergman's soap opera history

His most notable role has been his portrayal of Dr. Cliff Warner on All My Children, which he played from 1979 to 1987 and again from 1988 to 1989. His character helped form one of the serial’s first supercouples by falling in love and marrying Taylor Miller’s character, Nina Cortlandt. Soap columnists hypothesized that the two actors were so popular because they were the pinnacle of the image of the wholesome television couple, with their Nordic good looks, fair hair and blue eyes.

== See also ==
- List of supercouples
