= Mr. and Mrs. Ryan =

1986 American television film

- Written by: Bill Lamond; Jo Lamond
- Directed by: Peter H. Hunt
- Starring: Sharon Stone; Robert Desiderio
- Music by: John E. Davis
- Country of origin: United States
- Original language: English

Production
- Executive producers: Douglas S. Cramer; Aaron Spelling
- Producers: Duane Poole; Ralph Riskin; Tom Swale; E. Duke Vincent
- Cinematography: Phillip Lathrop
- Editors: Robert A. Ferretti; Robert L. Sinise
- Production companies: Aaron Spelling Productions; ABC

Original release
- Network: ABC
- Release: April 12, 1986

Mr. and Mrs. Ryan is a 1986 American TV film. It was an early starring role for Sharon Stone.

It was a pilot for a TV series that did not eventuate. The pilot aired as a stand-alone TV movie.

"Sharon read for us and we just flipped," said Aaron Spelling. "The network said she wasn't sexy enough."

Aaron Spelling's daughter Tori had a small role.

== Plot ==
A detective investigates crimes with the help of his socialite wife.

== Cast ==
- Sharon Stone as Ashley Hamilton Ryan
- Robert Desiderio as Lieutenant Michael Ryan
- Joseph Maher as Stockwell
- Christine Belford as Margo Slater
- David Fox-Brenton as Pershing
- Jay Robinson as Auctioneer
- Nicholas Worth as Kolvak
- Fred Coffin as Beckerman
- Walter Dalton as Sloan
- John H. Evans as Officer
- Garry Goodrow as Prisoner
- Frank Birney as Harlan
