= Hannah Free =

2009 film by Wendy Jo Carlton

- Directed by: Wendy Jo Carlton
- Written by: Claudia Allen
- Produced by: Claudia Allen; Tracy Baim; Wendy Jo Carlton; Martie Marro; Sharon Zurek; Sharon Gless
- Starring: Sharon Gless; Maureen Gallagher; Kelli Strickland; Ann Hagemann; Taylor Miller; Jax Jackson (as Jacqui Jackson)
- Cinematography: Gretchen Warthen
- Edited by: Sharon Zurek
- Music by: Martie Marro
- Production companies: Ripe Fruit Films, LLC
- Release date: July 10, 2009 (Outfest Film Festival)
- Country: United States

Hannah Free is a 2009 American lesbian romance film, adapted from Claudia Allen's play of the same name and starring Sharon Gless, Maureen Gallagher, Kelli Strickland, Ann Hagemann, Taylor Miller, and Jax Jackson.

== Plot ==
Set mostly in a nursing home, 70-something Hannah is kept separate from her lifelong friend and lover Rachel, who is not expected to emerge from her coma. The nurses follow the orders of Rachel's daughter Marge, who claims her mother would be upset by a visit from Hannah.

While Hannah's heart is breaking at the thought of not being able to say goodbye, her mind is full of memories of their life together, and she is frequently visited by a younger, spirit Rachel. Hannah sees, hears, and experiences her, but to anyone else, Hannah appears to be talking to herself. Frustrated by feeling like a prisoner, Hannah grumbles, pleads to see Rachel, and writes in her journal. The backstory gradually emerges.

Hannah transitioned easily from tomboy to openly gay while Rachel gave in to societal expectations, married, raised twins, and kept one foot in the closet most of her life, even though everyone knew about her relationship with Hannah. Rachel never left Michigan, but Hannah spent time in Alaska, South America, and during WWII, stationed in New Mexico as a WAC. She had affairs with other women in her travels and they remained good friends, but Rachel always was her true love. There are many flashbacks that show Hannah and Rachel in many aspects of their relationship: being in love, making love, and arguing.

In the nursing home, Hannah deals with the annoying but well-meaning staff members, a bewildered resident, a nasty evangelist, and an equally nasty Marge. The arrival of 21-year-old Greta serves as a catalyst to get Hannah out of bed and into Rachel's room. Greta poses as a random student doing an interview for class, but turns out to be Rachel's biological great-granddaughter, whom Hannah had only met as a young child. Greta has a complicated relationship with her grandmother, Marge, who has never truly accepted Hannah as any sort of important mother figure. Greta, a young lesbian, is fully committed to the rights of Hannah and Rachel, and schemes to bring the family together.

In an emotional final scene, Rachel lies comatose, while Hannah, Marge and Greta hash out their differences. Together, they say goodbye to Rachel, and lovingly set her free.

== Cast ==
- Sharon Gless as Hannah Free
- Maureen Gallagher as Older Rachel
- Kelli Strickland as Hannah 30's
- Ann Hagemann as Rachel 30's
- Taylor Miller as Marge
- Jax Jackson (as Jacqui Jackson) as Greta
- Pat Kane as the Minister
- Meg Thalken as the Mail Lady
- Les Hinderyckx as the Old Man
- Elaine Carlson as the Nurse
- Casey Tutton as Young Hannah
- Elita Ernsteen as Young Rachel

== Pre-production ==
Hannah Free was adapted by Claudia Allen from her own play. Claudia Allen is a playwright-in-residence at Victory Gardens Theater in Chicago. A hallmark of Allen's plays is the portrayal of strong, compassionate women. Author's note: “Few plays are written about elderly lesbians. Fewer plays deal with their extreme vulnerability in a system that doesn’t recognize our rights. I wanted to deal with those issues while also creating a love story about two women who loved each other for decades despite a few flaws and more than a few differences.”

== Direction ==
Wendy Jo Carlton is a filmmaker, writer, and photographer with a background in radio production, teaching, and media activism. Her award-winning narrative and experimental short films have screened internationally, including the American Film Institute, Sundance, and many other festivals. In addition to founding a media literacy program for teen girls called Chicks Make Flicks, Carlton works as a field producer for Sirius Radio and PBS Television.

== Production ==
Hannah Free was filmed in the historic Prairie Avenue District of Chicago. The Keith House was the main shooting location. The film's art department transformed rooms of the house into all the necessary sets, like the nursing home, Alaska shed, and various living spaces.

== Awards ==
- Audience Award for Best Feature Film at the Philadelphia Q-Fest.
- Audience Award for Best Narrative Feature film at the Austin Gay & Lesbian International Film Festival.
- Audience Choice Award for Favourite Feature at the Montreal International LGBT Film Festival.
- Audience Award for Best Narrative Feature film at the St. Louis Q-Fest.
- Outmusic Award for Outstanding Soundtrack in NYC (2009).
- Midwest Independent Award for Best Editor (Sharon Zurek).

== Screenings ==
- Frameline Film Festival 2009 as the closing night film.
- Los Angeles Outfest Film Festival 2009.
- Philadelphia Q-Fest 2009.
- St. Louis Q-Fest 2010.
- Austin Gay & Lesbian Film Festival 2009.
- Seattle Gay & Lesbian Film Festival 2009 as the closing night film.
- Pittsburgh Lesbian & Gay Film Festival as the opening night film.
- Outburst Queer Arts Festival 2009, Belfast, Northern Ireland.
