= Jane Prowse =

British theatre director and writer

Jane Prowse is a writer and director for theatre and television.

Her play, A Round-Heeled Woman, is a stage adaptation of Jane Juska's book A Round-Heeled Woman: My Late-Life Adventures in Sex and Romance. The play starred Sharon Gless and opened in San Francisco in January 2010; a new production, with Prowse directing ran at the GableStage Theatre in Coral Gables, Florida, starting 30 December 2010. The run was extended to 6 February 2011. A London production took place from 18 October – 20 November at Riverside Studios, also starring Gless and directed by Prowse. It transferred to the Aldwych Theatre, and closed on 14 January 2012.

Prowse co-wrote and directed Up on the Roof, which received three Olivier Award nominations, including Best Musical. She directed productions of the musical at the Alliance Theatre in Atlanta and the Long Wharf Theatre in Connecticut. Prowse wrote and directed an adaptation of John Steinbeck's The Pearl, which won her the Royal Shakespeare Company's Buzz Goodbody 'Best Director' Award. Other theatre includes Anthony Minghella's A Little Like Drowning, The Amazing Dancing Bear and Overboard.

Prowse co-wrote the screenplay for Up on the Roof, which was subsequently made into a film.

Television credits include working for Lynda La Plante, writing "Ghost Train" and "Witness" for Trial & Retribution, and "Boxers" for The Commander, which Prowse also directed. Other TV credits include The Green-Eyed Monster, The Fugitives, Between the Sheets, Rocket Man, Head Over Heels, The Tenth Kingdom, Living It, Sunny’s Ears and The Greatest Store in the World.

Prowse's first novel, Hattori Hachi: The Revenge of Praying Mantis, was published in 2009. Her second, Hattori Hachi: Stalking the Enemy was published in June 2010 and the third in the series, Hattori Hachi: Curse of the Diamond Daggers, was published in 2012.

In 2010 she wrote the script for the feature film Maya Fox, adapted from the books by Iginio Straffi and Silvia Brena.

== External sources ==
- Jane Prowse at IMDb
- A Round-Heeled Woman : the play The official site
- Hattori Hachi
