= Peter Bergman =

American actor (born 1953)

- Born: Peter Michael Bergman; June 11, 1953 (age 73); Guantanamo Bay, Cuba
- Occupation: Actor
- Years active: 1979–present
- Known for: All My Children as Cliff Warner (1979–1989); The Young and the Restless as Jack Abbott (1989–present)
- Spouses: Christine Ebersole (m. 1976; div. 1981) Mariellen Bergman (m. 1985)
- Children: 2

Peter Michael Bergman (born June 11, 1953) is an American television actor best known for his portrayals on soap operas: as Cliff Warner on All My Children (1979–89) on ABC and as Jack Abbott on The Young and the Restless (1989–present) on CBS.

== Biography ==
The son of Walter Bergman, a United States Navy officer, he was born in Guantanamo Bay, Cuba. He later graduated from Crossland High School in Camp Springs, Maryland. Bergman was married to actress and singer Christine Ebersole from 1976 to 1981. In 1985, he married Mariellen, with whom he has two children.

== Career ==
Bergman originally auditioned for the All My Children role of Dr. Jeff Martin. His first notable role was his portrayal of Dr. Cliff Warner on All My Children, which he played from May 24, 1979 to 1987 and again from 1988-89. His character, Cliff, married Nina (Taylor Miller) four times (1980, 1982, 1986 and 1989) and divorced her three times.

In a Vicks Formula 44 cough syrup advertising campaign in 1986, Bergman told the viewing audience: "I’m not a doctor, but I play one on TV". Chris Robinson, who played Dr. Rick Webber on ABC's General Hospital, was the original spokesperson in the ad campaign, which started in 1984. Bergman replaced Robinson after the latter experienced some legal difficulties.

Since November 27, 1989, Bergman has played the role of Jack Abbott on The Young and the Restless. In 1997, Bergman portrayed Jack Abbott in the episode "The Heather Biblow Story" on The Nanny, where he shared an on-screen kiss with Pamela Anderson. In 2001, he guest starred as Jack on The King of Queens in an episode of Season 3. In 2015, Bergman also portrayed Marco Annicelli, the doppelganger of Jack, on The Young and the Restless.

== Filmography ==
Television
Year	Title	Role	Notes
1976	Kojak	Bo Allen	Episode: "A Shield for Murder: Part 1"; Episode: "A Shield for Murder: Part 2"
1979–89	All My Children	Cliff Warner	Contract role
1982	Fantasies	Larry	Television film
1989	Money, Power, Murder.	Brant	Television film
1989–present	The Young and the Restless	Jack Abbott	Contract role
1989–present	The Young and the Restless	Marco Annicelli	Dual role (2015)
1991	Danielle Steel's 'Palomino'	Warren Taylor	Television film
1993	Woman on the Ledge	Bob	Television film
1994	The 5 Mrs. Buchanans	Clyde	Episode: "Clyde and Vivian and Ed and Malice"
1997	The Nanny	Jack Abbott	Episode: "The Heather Biblow Story"
1998	The Bold and the Beautiful	Jack Abbott	2 episodes (December 24 and 28, 1998)
2001	The King of Queens	Jack Abbott	Episode: "Inner Tube"
2025	Pluribus	Davis Taffler	Episode: "We Is Us"

Film
Year	Title	Role	Notes
2005	The Return of the Muskrats	Homeless man	Short film

== Awards and nominations ==
List of awards and nominations for Peter Bergman
Year	Award	Category	Work	Result	Ref.
1983	Daytime Emmy Award	Outstanding Lead Actor in a Drama Series	All My Children	Nominated	
1990	Daytime Emmy Award	Outstanding Lead Actor in a Drama Series	The Young and the Restless	Nominated	
1991	Daytime Emmy Award	Outstanding Lead Actor in a Drama Series	The Young and the Restless	Won	
1992	Daytime Emmy Award	Outstanding Lead Actor in a Drama Series	The Young and the Restless	Won	
1993	Daytime Emmy Award	Outstanding Lead Actor in a Drama Series	The Young and the Restless	Nominated	
1993	Soap Opera Digest Award	Outstanding Lead Actor	The Young and the Restless	Won	
1994	Daytime Emmy Award	Outstanding Lead Actor in a Drama Series	The Young and the Restless	Nominated	
1994	Soap Opera Digest Award	Outstanding Lead Actor	The Young and the Restless	Nominated	
1995	Daytime Emmy Award	Outstanding Lead Actor in a Drama Series	The Young and the Restless	Nominated	
1996	Daytime Emmy Award	Outstanding Lead Actor in a Drama Series	The Young and the Restless	Nominated	
1997	Daytime Emmy Award	Outstanding Lead Actor in a Drama Series	The Young and the Restless	Nominated	
1998	Daytime Emmy Award	Outstanding Lead Actor in a Drama Series	The Young and the Restless	Nominated	
1999	Daytime Emmy Award	Outstanding Lead Actor in a Drama Series	The Young and the Restless	Nominated	
2000	Daytime Emmy Award	Outstanding Lead Actor in a Drama Series	The Young and the Restless	Nominated	
2001	Daytime Emmy Award	Outstanding Lead Actor in a Drama Series	The Young and the Restless	Nominated	
2002	Daytime Emmy Award	Outstanding Lead Actor in a Drama Series	The Young and the Restless	Won	
2005	Daytime Emmy Award	Irresistible Combination (shared with Michelle Stafford)	The Young and the Restless	Nominated	
2007	Daytime Emmy Award	Outstanding Lead Actor in a Drama Series	The Young and the Restless	Nominated	
2008	Daytime Emmy Award	Outstanding Lead Actor in a Drama Series	The Young and the Restless	Nominated	
2010	Daytime Emmy Award	Outstanding Lead Actor in a Drama Series	The Young and the Restless	Nominated	
2013	Daytime Emmy Award	Outstanding Lead Actor in a Drama Series	The Young and the Restless	Nominated	
2014	Daytime Emmy Award	Outstanding Lead Actor in a Drama Series	The Young and the Restless	Nominated	
2017	Daytime Emmy Award	Outstanding Lead Actor in a Drama Series	The Young and the Restless	Nominated	
2018	Daytime Emmy Award	Outstanding Lead Actor in a Drama Series	The Young and the Restless	Nominated	
2019	Daytime Emmy Award	Outstanding Lead Actor in a Drama Series	The Young and the Restless	Nominated	
2022	Daytime Emmy Award	Outstanding Lead Actor in a Drama Series	The Young and the Restless	Nominated	
2023	Daytime Emmy Award	Outstanding Lead Actor in a Drama Series	The Young and the Restless	Nominated	
2025	Daytime Emmy Award	Outstanding Lead Actor in a Drama Series	The Young and the Restless	Nominated	

== See also ==
- Cliff Warner and Nina Cortlandt
- Supercouple
- Eric Braeden

Preceded by Terry Lester	Jack Abbott (role); 1989–present	Incumbent
