= Taylor Miller =

American soap opera actress (born 1953)

- Born: Linda Taylor Miller; August 18, 1953 (age 72); New Orleans, Louisiana, U.S.
- Education: Tulane University
- Occupation: Actress
- Years active: 1979–2011 (acting)
- Spouse: Eli Tullis Jr. (m. 1988)
- Children: 2

Linda Taylor Miller (born August 18, 1953) is an American soap opera actress.

== Early life and education ==
Miller was born in New Orleans, Louisiana. She was raised in Rochester, New York and also lived with her family in Fort Worth, Texas for a time. Miller moved frequently during her formative years due to her father's work as a pollution control specialist. She studied history at the H. Sophie Newcomb Memorial College at Tulane University from 1971 to 1975, joining the Chi Omega sorority.

== Career ==
Miller modeled in New York City for a short time before she was discovered. She had her first audition for the role of Nina Cortlandt and began appearing on All My Children only 2 1/2 months after her arrival.

She is best known for her role as Nina Cortlandt on ABC Daytime's All My Children (AMC), which she played from 1979 to 1984 and from 1986 to 1989. Miller returned in cameos in 1994, 1995, 1996, and 2010 (40th Anniversary Episode). She returned with Gillian Spencer, who played Nina's mother, on April 20, 2010, for the tribute to Palmer Cortlandt (James Mitchell). Her pairing with Peter Bergman's Dr. Cliff Warner was arguably the first supercouple on the soap.

During a break from All My Children, she played Sally Frame on Another World (1985–1986). She also appeared in the NBC series Knight Rider.

On February 2, 2017, Miller made a surprise appearance on the Hallmark Channel's Home & Family show, where she was reunited with a number of her former All My Children castmates.

== Personal life ==
In 1988, Miller married Eli Tullis Jr., also a native of New Orleans. She currently resides in Chicago, Illinois. After her two children went to college, Miller was inspired to make a career transition into the health and wellness field.

== Filmography ==
=== Film ===
Year	Title	Role	Notes
1993	Excessive Force	Devlin's Wife	Uncredited
2002	Design	Catherine Mallow	
2009	Hannah Free	Marge	

=== Television ===
Year	Title	Role	Notes
1979–2010	All My Children	Nina Cortlandt	58 episodes
1982	The Love Boat	Gail Cowler	Episode: "The Man in the Iron Shorts/The Victims/Heavens to Betsy"
1985	Knight Rider	Janet Morgan	Episode: 'Knightlines"
1985–1986	Another World	Sally Frame	12 episodes
1992	Overexposed	Gayle	Television film
2011	The Chicago Code	Liam's Mother	Episode: "Mike Royko's Revenge"

== See also ==
- Cliff Warner and Nina Cortlandt
