= Eva Randová =

Czech operatic mezzo-soprano (born 1936)

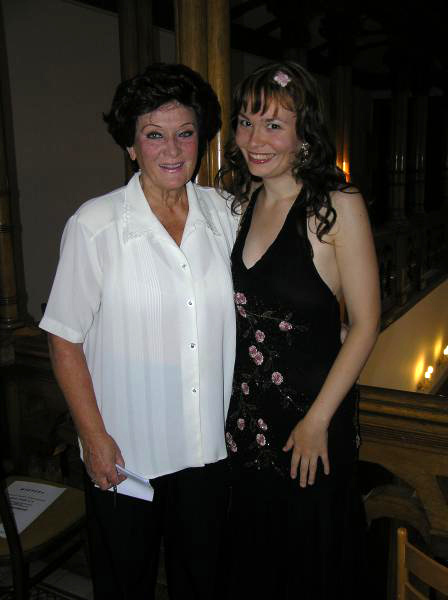
- Randová, left, with Cornelia Lanz
- Born: 31 December 1936 (age 89); Kolín, Czech Republic
- Education: Prague Conservatory
- Occupations: Operatic mezzo-soprano; Opera director
- Organizations: Staatsoper Stuttgart; State Opera, Prague
- Awards: 1987 Laurence Olivier Award

Eva Randová (born 31 December 1936) is a Czech operatic mezzo-soprano who made an international career based in Germany. She appeared at major opera houses including the Metropolitan Opera, and at festivals such as the Bayreuth Festival. She is known for performing Czech operas by Leoš Janáček and Antonín Dvořák.

== Career ==
Born in Kolín, Czech Republic, on 31 December 1936, Randová was a Czech champion in swimming several times. She first worked as a teacher of sports and math. She then studied voice at the Prague Conservatory.

She made her debut on the opera stage in 1962 in Ostrava and Prague. She joined the ensemble of the Staatsoper Stuttgart in 1971.

She appeared at the Bayreuth Festival first in 1973 as Waltraute in Wagner's Die Walküre and as Gutrune in Götterdämmerung, performing these parts also the following two years. In 1975, she also appeared as Kundry in Parsifal, singing the part also in 1976, 1977 and 1981. She appeared as Fricka in 1977 in the Jahrhundertring, the centenary production of Wagner's Der Ring des Nibelungen staged by Patrice Chéreau and conducted by Pierre Boulez.

She appeared at the Deutsche Oper Berlin as Azucena in Verdi's Il trovatore and as Laura in Ponchielli's La Gioconda. She sang at the Cologne Opera Klytämnestra in Elektra by Richard Strauss and as Ortrud in Wagner's Lohengrin. She was a guest at the Paris Opera and the Metropolitan Opera, among others. She took two parts in Dvořák's Rusalka at the Vienna State Opera in the 1980s, the mezzo part of the witch and the soprano part of the foreign princess.

Her portrayal of the Kostelnička Buryjovka in Janáček's Jenůfa at the Royal Opera House was nominated for a 1987 Laurence Olivier Award in the category Outstanding Achievement in Opera. She was the director (Intendantin) of the State Opera in Prague.

== Selected recordings ==
The German National Library holds recordings by Eva Randová, including:

- Ortrud in Wagner's Lohengrin
- Kostelnička Buryjovka in Janáček Jenufa
- Male fox in Janáček's The Cunning Little Vixen
- Witch and foreign princess in Dvořák's Rusalka
- Vlasta in Zdeněk Fibich's Šárka
- Lola in Schreker's Irrelohe
- Mahler's Second Symphony
- Janáček's Glagolitic Mass
- Plácido Domingo: Covent Garden Gala Concert

== Bibliography ==
- Karl-Josef Kutsch / Leo Riemens: Großes Sängerlexikon (Saur Verlag)
- Liner notes of the CD "Arien und Szenen aus Opern von Antonín Dvořák"
