= A Round-Heeled Woman: the play =

A Round-Heeled Woman: the play is a stage adaptation, by British playwright Jane Prowse, of Jane Juska's book A Round-Heeled Woman: my Late-life Adventures in Sex and Romance.

== Background ==
Juska placed an ad in The New York Review of Books which said "Before I turn 67 – next March – I would like to have a lot of sex with a man I like. If you want to talk first, Trollope works for me". She received 63 replies, from men aged between 32 and 84. A Round-Heeled Woman depicts some of the real-life encounters which resulted.

A workshop production ran in San Francisco from 5 January to 7 February 2010, with Sharon Gless in the lead role. A new production, directed by Prowse and also starring Gless, ran in Coral Gables, Florida, from December 30, 2010 to February 6, 2011. The play next ran at the Riverside Studios, Hammersmith, London, from 18 October 2011, again starring Gless, and then transferred to the West End.
