= Owen Marshall, Counselor at Law =

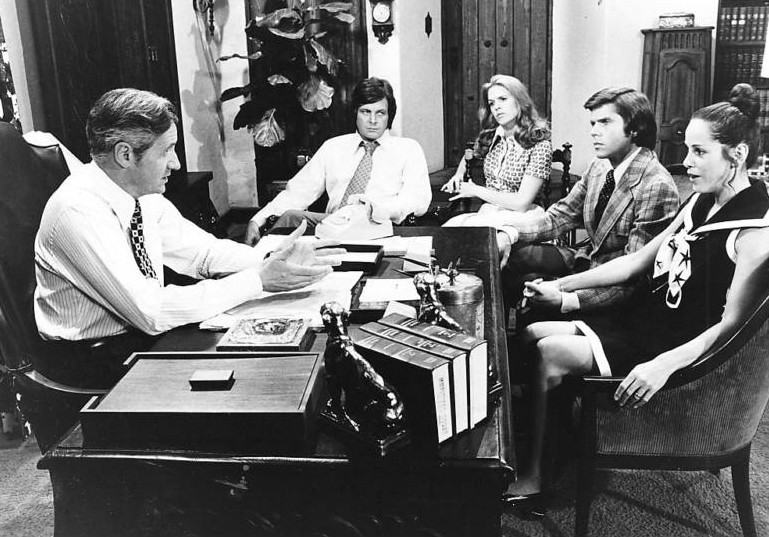
- Marshall (Arthur Hill) with clients. From left: Michael Witney, Sharon Gless, John Davidson, Louise Sorel, 1972.
- Created by: Jerry McNeely; David Victor
- Starring: Arthur Hill; Reni Santoni; David Soul; Lee Majors; Joan Darling; Christine Matchett
- Theme music composer: Elmer Bernstein
- Composer: Lyn Murray
- Country of origin: United States
- Original language: English
- No. of seasons: 3
- No. of episodes: 69 (list of episodes)

Production
- Camera setup: Single-camera
- Running time: 60 minutes
- Production companies: Groverton Productions; Universal Television

Original release
- Network: ABC
- Release: September 16, 1971 – August 24, 1974

Owen Marshall, Counselor at Law is an American legal drama, jointly created by David Victor and former speech professor Jerry McNeely, that starred Arthur Hill. The series was broadcast on ABC from 1971 to 1974; Victor and McNeely produced it under the "Groverton Productions" banner through Universal Television, then an MCA company. A two-hour pilot movie, titled "A Pattern of Morality," had aired as a 1971 ABC Movie of the Week entry prior to the beginning of the series run.

== Synopsis ==
Hill starred as Owen Marshall, a former prosecutor turned compassionate defense attorney, who defended various clients in Santa Barbara, California, with the help of his young assistants. During the series run, several actors appeared as Marshall's assistants, including Reni Santoni, David Soul, and Lee Majors.

Owen Marshall, Counselor at Law had two crossovers with Marcus Welby, M.D., another series in whose creation and production David Victor was directly involved. In the first, "Men Who Care," Welby (Robert Young) persuades Marshall to defend a man who is accused of killing his daughter's boyfriend, the daughter being one of Welby's patients. In the second, "I've Promised You a Father," Marshall defends Welby's colleague Dr. Steven Kiley (James Brolin) in a paternity suit filed by a young nurse, who claims that Kiley is the father of her child.

== Cast ==
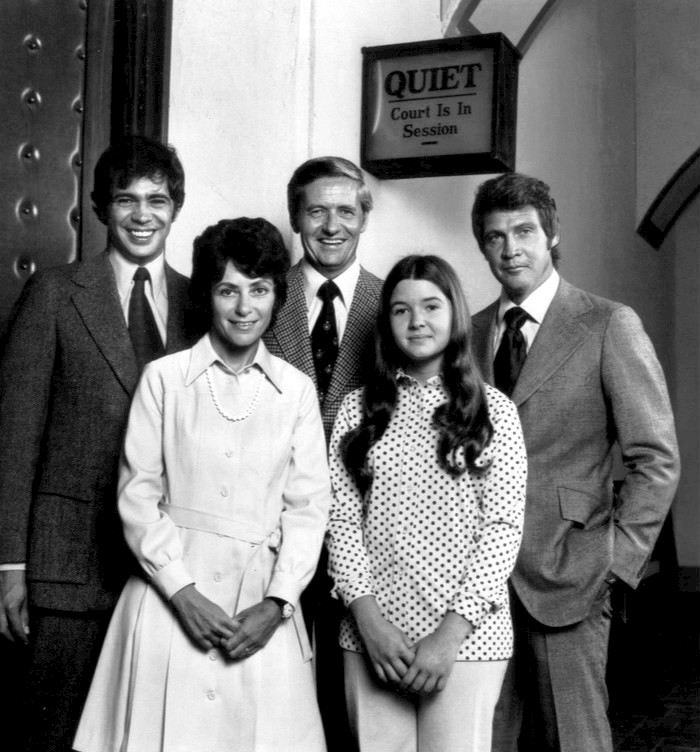
The cast in 1973.

- Arthur Hill as Owen Marshall
- David Soul as Ted Warrick
- Reni Santoni as Danny Paterno
- Lee Majors as Jess Brandon
- Joan Darling as Frieda Krause
- Christine Matchett as Melissa Marshall

=== Guest stars ===
The series marked one of director Steven Spielberg's earliest television directing stints and boasted many well-known guest stars, including:

- Christine Belford
- Lane Bradbury
- Pat Boone
- Rory Calhoun
- John David Carson
- John Davidson
- Gloria DeHaven
- John Denver
- Micky Dolenz
- Patty Duke
- Richard Eastham
- Farrah Fawcett
- Paul Fix
- Arthur Franz
- Sharon Gless
- Louis Gossett Jr.
- Mark Hamill
- Pat Harrington Jr.
- Darby Hinton
- Sam Jaffe
- Russell Johnson
- Kathleen Lloyd
- Donald Mantooth
- Randolph Mantooth
- Richard Ely
- Scott Marlowe
- Tim Matheson
- Darren McGavin
- Donna Mills
- Vic Morrow
- Ricky Nelson
- Gerald S. O'Loughlin
- Michael Parks
- Dennis Patrick
- Larry Pennell
- Edward Platt
- Michael Rupert
- Susan Sarandon
- Dick Sargent
- Tom Selleck
- William Shatner
- Martin Sheen
- O. J. Simpson
- Richard X. Slattery
- Susan Strasberg
- Joan Tompkins (thricely)
- John Travolta
- Lindsay Wagner
- Jane Wyman
- Dana Wynter

== Episodes ==
| Season | Episodes | Originally released | |
| Season | Episodes | First released | Last released |
|---|---|---|---|
| Television film | | September 12, 1971 | |
| 1 | 23 | September 16, 1971 | March 2, 1972 |
| 2 | 23 | September 14, 1972 | March 14, 1973 |
| 3 | 23 | September 12, 1973 | April 6, 1974 |
