= The Green-Eyed Monster (2001 film) =

- Genre: Crime drama
- Written by: Jane Prowse
- Directed by: Jane Prowse
- Starring: Emma Fielding; Hugo Speer; Matt Day; Fay Ripley; Rakie Ayola; Ray Stevenson; Lisa Palfrey; Gregor Truter; Tom Knight
- Composer: Francis Haines
- Country of origin: United Kingdom
- Original language: English
- No. of series: 1
- No. of episodes: 2

Production
- Executive producers: Davina Belling; Mike Dormer; Gareth Neame; Clive Parsons
- Producer: Gillian Gordon
- Cinematography: Simon Kossoff
- Editor: Ian Sutherland
- Running time: 90 minutes
- Production companies: Film and General Productions

Original release
- Network: BBC1
- Release: 9 September 2001

The Green-Eyed Monster is a two-part British television crime drama film, written and directed by Jane Prowse, that first broadcast on BBC1 on 9 September 2001. The film, which stars Emma Fielding, Matt Day and Hugo Speer in the title roles, follows the murder of Liam (Day) by his neighbour Ray (Speer), amidst accusations of infidelity and deception from fellow residents of the quiet suburban street where he and his wife Marni (Fielding) are residing.

The film attracted less than 4.9 million viewers, placing it outside of the Top 30 most watched programmes that week. The film remains unreleased on VHS or DVD.

== Plot ==
Marni and Liam are a happily married couple, both teachers at a grade school which is trying to raise money to pay for the lavish swimming pool they have installed. Their next-door neighbours are Deanna, who is taking unsuccessful swimming lessons at the pool when the story opens, and Ray. Ray works at an abattoir and has a bad drinking problem which causes him to crash through the couples’ shared fence; Deanna speaks harshly to Ray as she takes him inside.

Liam is found dying of multiple stab wounds in Deanna and Ray’s house; he dies, the school mourns him and decides to name the new swimming pool after him, and the police conclude that Ray killed him in jealousy because Liam and Deanna were having an affair. Ray accepts that he may have done it, but was so drunk he does not remember the actual deed. Marni is even more devastated at Liam’s infidelity than at his death, and embarks upon a long journey of increasing suspicion about his secret life and whether she ever knew him. She turns for comfort to her friend Alec, headmaster of the school, and they spend a night together, poisoning her friendship with fellow-teacher Leila, Alec’s current girlfriend, who had been Liam's girlfriend when he met Marni. Marni also finds a photo of another woman among Liam's things, and obsesses over who she is.

Meanwhile, Deanna is intruding on her mourning with unwanted meals and other favours, insisting that she and Liam never had sex, and showing Marni pictures of herself horribly bruised to back her story that Ray was an abusive husband. She reveals that she is pregnant, and as time goes on talks more and more about intimate talks with Liam; she has the pendant he wore, and says he wanted her to have it. She refuses for a while to testify to Ray's abusiveness at his trial, which could mean he will be convicted only of manslaughter and get a light sentence. But when she changes her mind and does testify, she says just what Marni did not want to hear: that she and Liam were having an affair, and that Ray was provoked. She claims that Marni inflicted the bruises in the photos. Ray, still bewildered on the stand as to whether he killed Liam, is convicted of manslaughter. The police accuse Marni of lying to them and suggest that she needs to move out of her house because Deanna has a restraining order against her, and the school decides not to name the swimming pool after Liam.

Marni finally talks to Ray in prison, and he reveals that Deanna’s baby cannot be his because he is impotent. She finds the woman in the photo and her husband, who reveal that Deanna wrecked their lives with false allegations so that they had to move far away; she bruised herself, took the pictures and accused the husband.

Marni confronts Deanna, and they end up at the swimming pool, where Deanna threatens Marni with a knife. They struggle for it on the diving platform, Marni stabs Deanna in her pregnant-looking belly, and red beans spill out of it. Deanna then admits, and we see in a flashback, that she killed Liam when he refused her advances. She waves his pendant at Marni. In the continuing struggle, she falls into the pool and drowns.

The swimming pool, the money fully raised, is named after Liam and has its grand opening. At the ceremony, Marni is invited to dedicate it by swimming the first length in it. When she does, she dives down to the bottom, finds Liam’s pendant, and surfaces to hold it up in triumph.

== Cast ==
- Emma Fielding as Marni
- Hugo Speer as Ray
- Matt Day as Liam
- Fay Ripley as Deanna
- Rakie Ayola as Leila
- Ray Stevenson as Alec
- Lisa Palfrey as DC Karen Carter
- Gregor Truter as DC Neil Wiley
- Tom Knight as Det Supt Frank Harrison
- Philip Wright as Peter Marshall QC
- Joseph Long as Abraham James QC
- James Greene as Donal Maguire
- Jordan Maxwell as Arfan
- Gary Pillai as Dr. Stevens
- David Nellist as Paul Mitchell
- Greg Chillingarian as Renato
- Helen Atkins as Vicky
- Ian Pirie as Dave

== See also ==
- The Green-Eyed Monster (1916 film)
- The Green Eyed Monster (1919 film)
