= Claudia Allen =

American playwright and educator (born 1954)

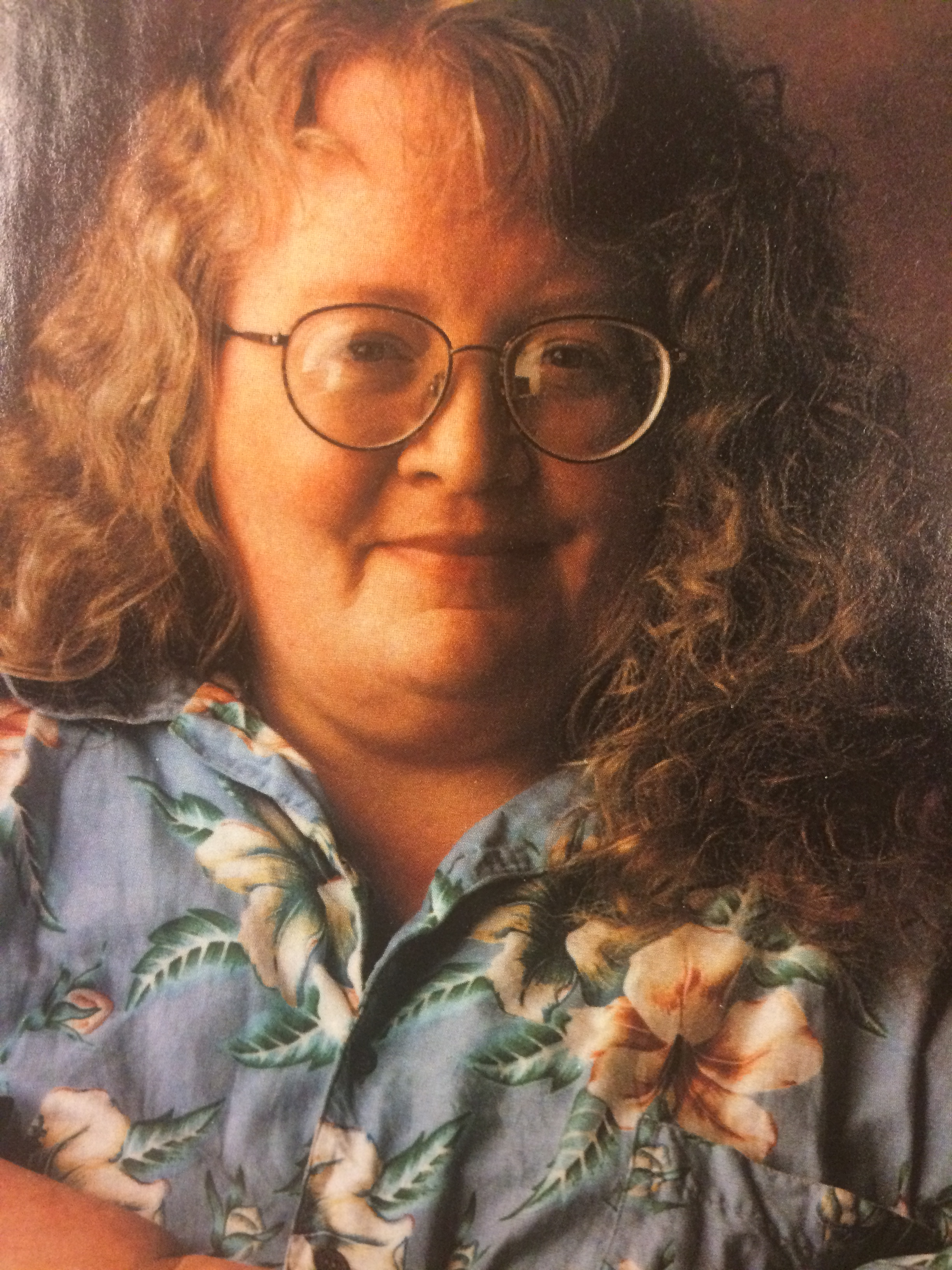
- Born: October 2, 1954 (age 71)
- Known for: Hannah Free
- Awards: Joseph Jefferson Award

Claudia Allen is an American playwright and educator based in Chicago, Illinois. She is known for writing LGBT characters in her plays, for Hannah Free, and for her association with the Victory Gardens Theater.

== Life ==
Claudia Allen was born on October 2, 1954, and grew up in Clare, Michigan. She attended the University of Michigan, graduating with a Bachelor's degree and a Master's degree in English. In 1979, Allen left Michigan for Chicago. Allen began writing, depicting the lesbian and bisexual characters she felt were absent from media. 11 of Allen's 24 produced plays (as of 2010) have lesbian themes or lesbian or bisexual main characters. Allen is "out and proud."

Allen wrote throughout the 1980s without getting produced. Her works have been featured and produced around Chicago, such as her play They Even Got the Rienzi, which was one of only two works by women in the Great Chicago Playwrights Exposition by Victory Gardens and Body Politic theaters in 1987. In the late 80s and early 90s, Allen developed a relationship with the creative team at Victory Gardens, and saw her plays produced there in number.

Allen's most produced lesbian play is Hannah Free, which premiered at Chicago's Bailiwick Repertory Theatre in 1992. Allen co-produced and wrote the screenplay of the 2009 film, Hannah Free, starring Sharon Gless. She also wrote the novelization, Hannah Free: the Novel (2010).

Allen has taught at DePaul University, Northwestern University, University of Chicago, Lake Forest College, and Western Michigan University.

Claudia Allen has collections of scripts, drafts, programs, and other documents with DePaul University Special Collections and Archives, and with the Chicago Public Library.

== Victory Gardens Theater ==
Allen is an original member of the Victory Gardens Playwrights' Ensemble, which was founded in 1996. She often partnered with Sandy Shinner, the associate artistic director of Victory Gardens. Allen premiered many works at Victory Gardens, including I Sailed with Magellan, Winter and Fossils (both starred Julie Harris), Cahoots (starring Sharon Gless), Deed of Trust, The Long Awaited and Still Waters (all starring Deanna Dunagan), Unspoken Prayers, and Hanging Fire.

== Awards ==
Allen has won two Jeff Awards for New Works, for The Long Awaited in 1989 and for Still Waters in 1991. Allen's Jeff nominations for New Works include Winter in 1999, Xena Live Episode 2: Xena Lives! The Musical in 2002, and I Sailed With Magellan in 2007. Allen's play I Sailed With Magellan is an adaptation of Stuart Dybek's book, I Sailed with Magellan.

Allen was named Best Playwright by Chicago (magazine) in 1999.

In 2000, Allen received a Trailblazer Award from Bailiwick Repertory Theatre.
