= Jane Juska =

American writer

- Born: March 7, 1933; Ann Arbor, Michigan, United States
- Died: October 24, 2017 (aged 84); Chico, California, United States
- Education: University of Michigan
- Occupation: Writer

Jane Juska (March 7, 1933 – October 24, 2017) was an American author and retired schoolteacher whose first book, A Round-Heeled Woman: My Late-Life Adventures in Sex and Romance (2003), documented her search for sex at 66 years of age by putting a personal ad in the New York Review of Books.

Sharon Gless starred in Jane Prowse's stage adaptation, A Round-Heeled Woman: the play, which had a workshop production in San Francisco in 2010. Another production, directed by Jane Prowse, ran from December 2010 to February 2011 in Florida. The play next ran at the Riverside Studios, Hammersmith, London, from 18 October 2011, again starring Gless, and then transferred to the West End.

Juska wrote a follow-up, Unaccompanied Women: Late-Life Adventures in Love, Sex, and Real Estate three years later, which continued to document her desire to find a man to keep her company. In addition, it chronicles her globe-trotting adventures, due in part to her travels surrounding her first book. As well, she wrote a novel, titled Mrs. Bennet Has Her Say (2015). She died on October 24, 2017, at the age of 84.
