= I Sailed with Magellan =

2003 novel

First edition

I Sailed with Magellan is a "novel-in-stories" by Stuart Dybek, published in 2003 by Farrar, Straus and Giroux.

== Plot ==
The volume's eleven stories are set on Chicago's Southwest Side in the 1950s and 1960s. They are connected by protagonist Perry Katzek, a Polish-American boy growing up in the city's Little Village neighborhood.

== Reception ==
Albert Mobilio of The New York Times wrote, "Dybek solidifies his reputation as the rightful heir to [James T.] Farrell's gritty realism". Donna Seaman of the Chicago Tribune wrote, "Dybek masterfully evoke the intricate, singing web of urban life" and "aligns the longings and aspirations of his empathically rendered characters with Chicago's often forbidding, sometimes radiantly beautiful cityscape." Jeff Jensen of Entertainment Weekly rated it A and wrote, "All are gems; each glistens with Dybek's spare poetry; combined, they form a vibrant mosaic about a boy's coming of age."

It was the winner of the 2003 Adult Fiction Award from the Society of Midland Authors.

== Adaptations ==
Claudia Allen adapted it into a play in 2007.
