= Gillian Spencer =

American soap opera actress and writer (born 1939)

Gillian Spencer (born December 18, 1939) is an American daytime soap opera actress and writer. She is known for originating the role of Victoria Lord on ABC's One Life to Live.

== Career ==
=== Television ===
In the early 1960s, Spencer had supporting roles on the soaps The Secret Storm and The Edge of Night playing villains. In 1965, she joined Guiding Light in 1965 in the role of the troubled heroine Robin Fletcher. Gillian was part of the original cast of One Life to Live as the original Victoria Lord from 1968 until 1970, and it was during her stint that Viki's split personality was introduced. While Erika Slezak would become famous for this part, Gillian and Lee Patterson (Joe Riley) were fan favorites and the show's first major romantic couple.

From 1972 to 1975, she played As the World Turns's Jennifer Hughes, Kim Stewart's sister, Bob's third wife and Frannie's mother who died after being hit by a motorist. However, she is probably best remembered for playing the role of Daisy Cortlandt on the ABC soap, All My Children, a role she played from 1980 through 1989, and in 1991, 1994, 1995, 1996, and on April 20, 2010 with Taylor Miller (Nina Cortlandt) for the tribute episode for James Mitchell (Palmer Cortlandt). Daisy (Palmer's first wife) was originally presumed dead and used the alias "Monique Jonvil" to befriend Nina in college.

Over the years, Nina often referred to her mother as "Monique". For her role of Daisy, Spencer received an Emmy Nomination for Best Actress. In 1997, Gillian made a guest return to "As the World Turns" where the spirit of Jennifer appeared to her ailing sister.

=== Film ===
Spencer appeared in the 1968 feature comedy What's So Bad About Feeling Good?; in the film, she plays The Sack, a melancholy young woman living in a New York City commune with a burlap sack covering her entire body except for her bare feet.

=== Writing ===
As of 2001, Spencer was a writer for General Hospital. She was co-head writer of Another World. She has also been a writer for As the World Turns, All My Children and the serial Days of Our Lives.

== Personal life ==
Spencer has two sons.

== Positions held ==
All My Children

- Script Writer (1989– 1991)
- Story Consultant (1986–1989)
- Actress: Daisy Cortlandt (1979–1989, 1994, 1995, 2010)

Another World

- Script Writer (1997–1999)

As the World Turns

- Script Writer (1993–1994)
- Actress: Jennifer Sullivan Ryan Hughes, R. N. (1972–1975, 1997)

Days of Our Lives

- Script Writer (September 3, 2001 – September 2003)

The Edge of Night

- Actress: Lyn Wilkins (1962–1963)

General Hospital

- Breakdown Writer (2000–2001)

Guiding Light

- Script Writer (March 2004 – May 13, 2005)
- Occasional Script Writer (2003)
- Actress: Robin Lang (1964–1967)

One Life to Live

- Interim Headwriter (1999 – 1999)
- Script Writer (1999)
- Breakdown Writer (1999)
- Actress: Victoria Lord (1968–1970)

The Secret Storm

- Actress: Leora Davies (1963)
