= Stuart Dybek =

American writer (born 1942)

- Born: April 10, 1942; Chicago, Illinois
- Education: St. Rita of Cascia High School; Loyola University Chicago; Iowa Writers' Workshop
- Occupations: Short fiction writer, poet
- Writing career
- Period: 1970s-
- Genres: Poetry; Novels
- Notable work: The Coast of Chicago

Stuart Dybek (born April 10, 1942) is an American writer of fiction and poetry.

== Biography ==
Dybek, a second-generation Polish American, was born in Chicago, Illinois and raised in Chicago's Little Village and Pilsen neighborhoods in the 1950s and early 1960s. He graduated from St. Rita of Cascia High School in 1959 and earned an MFA from the Iowa Writers' Workshop at the University of Iowa. He has an MA in literature from Loyola University Chicago.

Often compared to Saul Bellow and Theodore Dreiser for his unique portrayal of setting and landscapes, Dybek is "among the first writers of Polish descent (who write about the ethnic self) to receive national recognition."

After teaching for more than 30 years at Western Michigan University, where he remains an adjunct professor of English and a member of the permanent faculty of the Prague Summer Program, Dybek became the Distinguished Writer in Residence at Northwestern University where he teaches at the School of Professional Studies.

== Work ==
Dybek's two collections of poems are Brass Knuckles (1979) and Streets in Their Own Ink (2004). His fiction includes Childhood and Other Neighborhoods, The Coast of Chicago, I Sailed with Magellan, a novel-in-stories, Paper Lantern: Love Stories, and Ecstatic Cahoots: Fifty Short Stories. His work has been anthologized and has appeared in magazines such as Harper's, The New Yorker, Atlantic Monthly, Poetry, Tin House, Ploughshares, The Magazine of Fantasy and Science Fiction and TriQuarterly.

His collection, The Coast of Chicago, was selected as a New York Times Notable Book and cited as an American Library Association Notable Book of 2005. A story from I Sailed with Magellan, titled "Breasts," appears in the 2004 Best American Short Stories.

Dybek was a participant in the Michigan Writers Series at Michigan State University, where he read from his work.

== Awards ==
Dybek's awards include a Lannan Prize, a PEN/Malamud Award (1995), a Whiting Award (1985), a Guggenheim fellowship, and an O. Henry Award. Dybek was awarded a MacArthur Fellowship on September 25, 2007.

== Bibliography ==
=== Novels and short story collections ===
- Childhood and Other Neighborhoods: Stories. Viking Adult. 1980. ISBN 978-0-67021-618-5.
- The Coast of Chicago: Stories. Knopf. 1990. ISBN 978-0-39457-449-3.
- I Sailed with Magellan. Farrar, Straus and Giroux. 2003. ISBN 978-0-37417-407-1.
- Ecstatic Cahoots: Fifty Short Stories. Farrar, Straus and Giroux. 3 June 2014. ISBN 978-0-374-71055-2.
- Paper Lantern: Love Stories. Farrar, Straus and Giroux. 3 June 2014. ISBN 978-0-374-14644-3.

=== Poetry collections ===
- Brass Knuckles. University of Pittsburgh Press. 1979. ISBN 978-0-82293-399-1.
- Streets in Their Own Ink. Farrar, Straus and Giroux. 2004. ISBN 978-0-37427-095-7.

Pelligro

=== Short stories and essays ===
- "Prayer" | X-1 Experimental Fiction Project | The Smith: 1976 | 49-52
- Dybek, Stuart (Autumn 2009). "Seiche". Granta (108): 39–46.
- "Vigil". The Atlantic. Fiction Issue. 2011.
