= Up on the Roof (musical) =

Musical by Simon Moore and Jane Prowse

Up on the Roof is a musical by Simon Moore and Jane Prowse, which follows a decade in the lives of five friends who form an a cappella singing group at university.

The show was first staged in 1987 in London and starred Mark McGann and Gary Olsen, and it was nominated for an Olivier Award for Best Musical and McGann and Olsen were nominated for best actor in a musical. It was revived at the Queen's Theatre, Hornchurch, in May and June 2006.

The show was made into a 1997 UK TV film starring Adrian Lester and directed by Simon Moore. The film was broadcast on ITV on October 31, 1997. Time Out gave the TV film a negative rating.
