= Sharon Gless =

American actress (born 1943)

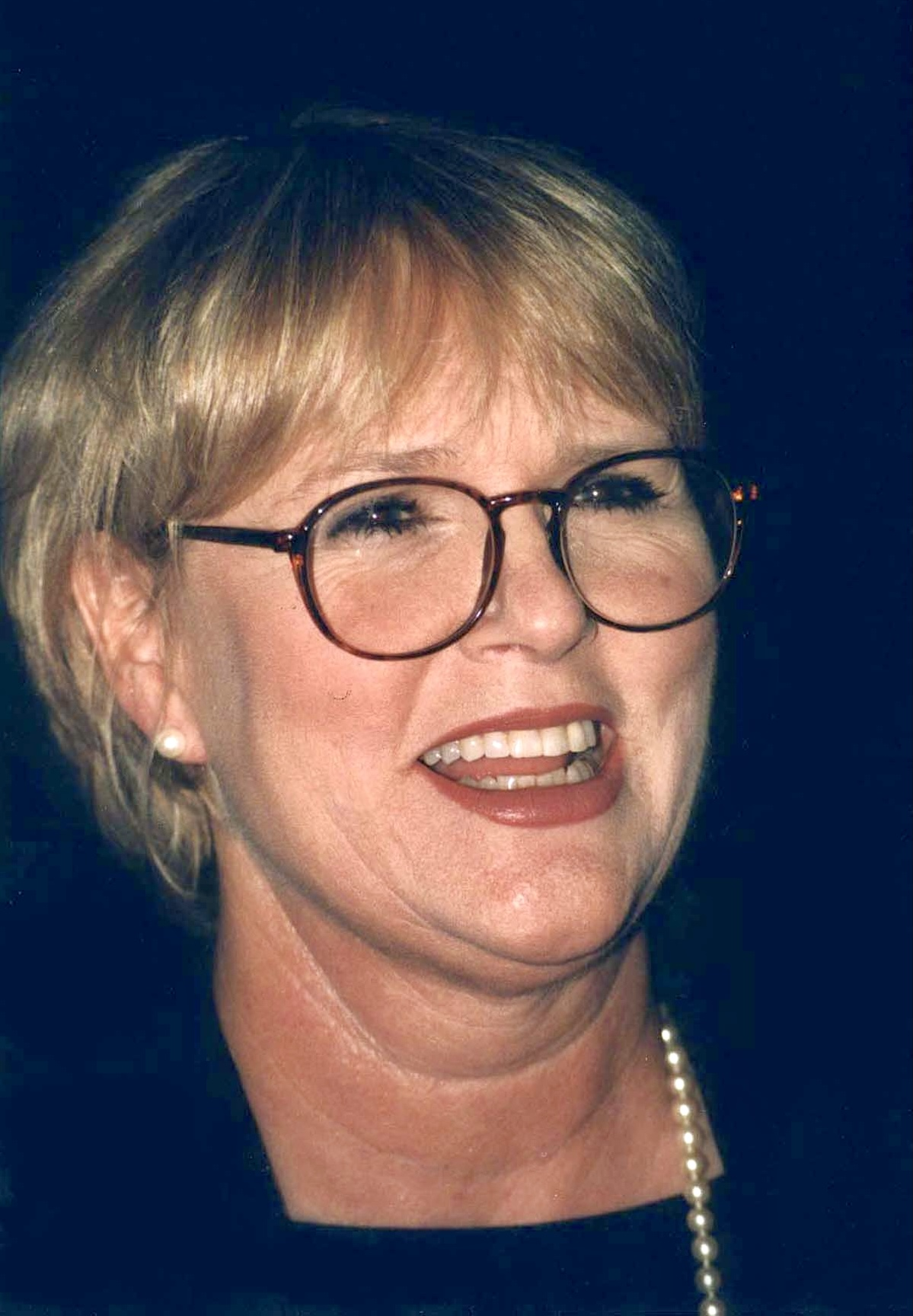
- Gless in 1998
- Born: Sharon Marguerite Gless; May 31, 1943 (age 83); Los Angeles, California, U.S.
- Occupation: Actress
- Years active: 1970–present
- Known for: Switch; Cagney & Lacey; The Trials of Rosie O'Neill; Queer as Folk; Burn Notice; Hannah Free
- Spouse: Barney Rosenzweig (m. 1991)
- Relatives: Elizabeth Baur (cousin)
- Website: sharongless.com

Sharon Marguerite Gless (born May 31, 1943) is an American actress known for her television roles. She portrayed Maggie Philbin on Switch (1975–1978), Sgt. Christine Cagney in the police procedural drama series Cagney & Lacey (1982–1988), and the title role in The Trials of Rosie O'Neill (1990–1992). She also played Debbie Novotny in the Showtime cable television series Queer as Folk (2000–2005) and Madeline Westen on Burn Notice (2007–2013).

A 10-time Emmy Award nominee and seven-time Golden Globe Award nominee, Gless won a Golden Globe in 1986 and an Emmy in 1986 and 1987 for Cagney & Lacey, as well as a second Golden Globe in 1991 for The Trials of Rosie O'Neill. She received a star on the Hollywood Walk of Fame in 1995.

== Early life and career ==
A fifth-generation Californian, Gless was born in Los Angeles, the daughter of Marjorie (McCarthy) and sportswear manufacturing executive Dennis J. Gless. She grew up Catholic. She has two brothers, Michael McCarthy Gless and Aric Dennis Gless. Her parents divorced when she was in her teens.

Her maternal grandfather was Neil McCarthy, a prominent Los Angeles attorney for Howard Hughes who had a large clientele of major film-studio executives and actors. Wanting to become an actress, she asked her grandfather's opinion. He told her, "Stay out of it, it's a filthy business!" A few years later, though, when she spoke to him again about acting, he encouraged her and gave her money for acting classes.

Gless worked as a secretary for advertising agencies Grey Advertising, and then for the independent movie production company General Film Corporation. While she worked as a production assistant, Gless studied drama with acting coach Estelle Harman. In 1972, talent agent Monique James asked Gless to prepare a short scene and perform it for her.

Soon after James offered her a 7-year contract with Universal Studios, and she remained under contract until Universal ended all contracts in 1981; James continued as her agent and mentor for another eleven years. Near the end of her contract, she was identified in the media as the last of the contract players. Universal was the last company to use the salaried, old Hollywood apprentice system.

Actress Elizabeth Baur was Gless's cousin.

== Career ==
=== Film and television ===
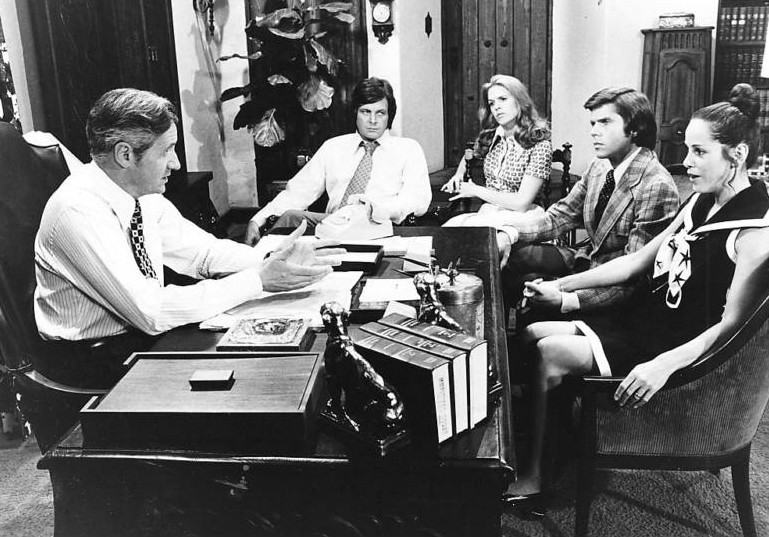
From left: Arthur Hill, Michael Witney, Gless, John Davidson and Louise Sorel on ABC's Owen Marshall, Counselor at Law (1972)

At the beginning of her career, Gless appeared in numerous television series and TV movies, such as Revenge of the Stepford Wives, Faraday & Company with Dan Dailey and James Naughton in 1973 and 1974, Adam-12 season six, episode 24, Emergency! as a sculptor in 1975, and The Rockford Files. She played small parts in Marcus Welby, M.D. (1969–1976), until being offered the role of Kathleen Faverty, which she played from 1974 to 1976. That was in addition to a variety of guest-starring roles on television, including the part of the classy young secretary, Maggie Philbin, alongside Eddie Albert and Robert Wagner on the CBS private detective/con artist series Switch (1975–1978). Although she was a newcomer on the show, she got along very well with both Albert and Wagner, both on and off screen. When the show was canceled after the third season, she thanked both Albert and Wagner for giving her career a jump start and remained close friends with them.

While under contract with Universal, she co-starred in a number of properties, including the 1979 Steven Bochco television sitcom, Turnabout (based on the Thorne Smith 1931 novel about a husband and wife who temporarily switch bodies), which failed to be a ratings blockbuster, and briefly in the sitcom House Calls (in which she replaced Lynn Redgrave, who had left due to a contract dispute).

Beginning with the series' seventh episode / first full season, Gless replaced actress Meg Foster in the role of NYPD police detective Christine Cagney on Cagney & Lacey. (The role was originated in the pilot installment, by Loretta Swit. Swit, like Foster, was chosen as Cagney because although the character of Cagney had been created with Gless herself in mind, she was unavailable for the pilot or the first seven installments of the first season.) In 1991, she married the series' executive producer, Barney Rosenzweig, who speaks in his book Cagney & Lacey...and Me about wanting Sharon Gless from the beginning and Gless being unavailable due to her contract with Universal. Rosenzweig created the 1990–1992 CBS drama series The Trials of Rosie O'Neill for Gless, and uncredited he played a psychiatrist, who was only partially seen. She has received six Emmy nominations—including two wins and a Golden Globe win for her role as Cagney—earned two additional Emmy nominations and a second Golden Globe win for the series.

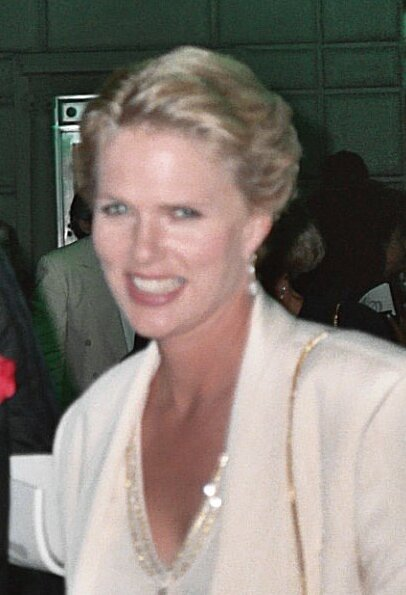
Gless at the Emmy Awards 1991

In 1993 and 1995, Gless and her television partner, Tyne Daly, recreated their title roles in four critically acclaimed as well as popular Cagney & Lacey television movies. Gless and Daly jokingly called these "The Menopause Years". In 1998, Gless narrated the documentary Ayn Rand: A Sense of Life, which received an Academy Award nomination for Best Documentary Feature.

Between 2000 and 2005, Gless appeared as Hal Sparks' mother, Debbie Novotny, in her biggest and most critically acclaimed role since Cagney & Lacey in the acclaimed Showtime cable television series Queer as Folk. In 2000, she appeared on an episode of Touched by an Angel entitled "The Perfect Game". On May 26, 2005, she was one of the mourners at Eddie Albert's funeral, along with ex-Switch co-stars Robert Wagner and Charlie Callas.

In 2006, Gless starred in the BBC television series The State Within. The next year she co-starred in the USA Network cable television series Burn Notice, playing Michael Westen's (Jeffrey Donovan) mother, Madeline Westen. In addition, Gless was a guest star on several episodes of the FX Network cable television series Nip/Tuck as an unstable agent, Colleen Rose, a role that netted her an Emmy Award nomination. In 2009, Gless starred in her first leading role as a lesbian character in the independent film Hannah Free (Ripe Fruit Films), described as a film about a lifelong love affair between an independent spirit and the woman she calls home. The film is based on a screenplay by the Jeff Award–winning playwright Claudia Allen and directed by Wendy Jo Carlton.

In 2017, Gless was announced as appearing in one episode of the BBC's Casualty, the world's longest-running medical drama, as surgeon Zsa Zsa Harper-Jenkinson. She appears in the 13th episode of the serial's 32nd series. Gless called Zsa Zsa a "wonderful character". Gless was invited to appear in the show by one of the producers, and expressed interest in reprising the role. Gless' appearance marked the first time the show has flown an American to the UK to film a role. She reprised the role on the October 13, 2018 episode.

Gless served on the advisory board of the Los Angeles Student Film Institute.

=== Theater ===
Gless made her stage debut in Lillian Hellman's Watch on the Rhine at Stage West in Springfield, Massachusetts. Gless had two appearances in London's West End, first in the fall of 1992 with Bill Paterson, when she created the role of Annie Wilkes in the stage version of Stephen King's Misery at the Criterion Theatre, and then in 1996, where she appeared opposite Tom Conti in Neil Simon's Chapter Two, at the Gielgud Theatre.

She starred at Chicago playhouse The Victory Gardens Theater in Claudia Allen's Cahoots, as well as several stints, including an evening at Madison Square Garden with the National Company of Eve Ensler's The Vagina Monologues.

Gless's most recent stage appearance was as Jane Juska in A Round-Heeled Woman, Jane Prowse's stage adaptation of Jane Juska's book A Round-Heeled Woman: My Late-life Adventures in Sex and Romance. The first production ran in San Francisco in early 2010. She starred in a new production in Miami, December 2010 - February 2011, directed by Jane Prowse. A production took place in London, transferring in November 2011 from Riverside Studios to the Aldwych Theatre, where the run closed on January 14, 2012.

== Publications ==
- 2021: Apparently There Were Complaints: A Memoir, Simon & Schuster (Autobiography)

== Personal life ==
In 1991, Gless married Barney Rosenzweig, the producer of Cagney & Lacey.

== Filmography ==
=== Film ===
Year	Title	Role	Notes
1973	Bonnie's Kids	Sharon	
1974	Airport 1975	Sharon	
1983	The Star Chamber	Emily Hardin	
1997	Ayn Rand: A Sense of Life	Narrator	
2000	Bring Him Home	Mary Daley	
2009	Hannah Free	Hannah	
2010	Once Fallen	Sue	
2023	Fast Charlie	Mavis	

=== Television ===
Year	Title	Role	Notes
1972	Ironside	Jennifer	Episode: "House of Terror"
1972	The Longest Night	Switchboard Operator	Television film
1972	The Sixth Sense	Kay	Episode: "Coffin, Coffin in the Sky"
1972	McCloud	Sgt. Maggie Clinger	Episode: "The New Mexican Connection"
1972	All My Darling Daughters	Jennifer	Television film
1972	Emergency!	Undercover Police officer	Episode: "Fuzz Lady"
1972–1976	Marcus Welby, M.D.	Kathleen Faverty	21 episodes
1973	My Darling Daughters' Anniversary	Jennifer	Television film
1973–1974	Faraday & Company	Holly Barrett	4 episodes
1974	Adam-12	Lynn Carmichael	Episode: "Clinic on 18th St."
1974	The Bob Newhart Show	Rosalie Shaeffer	Episode: "The Modernization of Emily"
1974	The Rockford Files	Susan Jameson	Episode: "This Case Is Closed"
1975	Lucas Tanner	Miss Reynolds	Episode: "Those Who Cannot, Teach"
1975	Emergency!	Sculptor	Episode: "Election"
1975–1978	Switch	Maggie Philbin	71 episodes
1976	Baa Baa Black Sheep	Navy Nurse	Episode: "The Flying Misfits"
1976	The Rockford Files	Lori Jenivan	Episode: "The Fourth Man"
1976	Kojak	Nancy Parks	Episode: "Law Dance"
1976	Richie Brockelman: The Missing 24 Hours	Darcy Davenport	Television film
1978	Crash	Lesley Fuller	Television film
1978	The Immigrants	Jean Seldon Lavetta	miniseries
1979	Centennial	Sidney Endermann	5 episodes
1979	Turnabout	Penny Alston/Sam Alston	7 episodes
1979	The Last Convertible	Kay Haddon	Television film
1980	Hardhat and Legs	Patricia Botsford	Television film
1980	The Kids Who Knew Too Much	Karen Goldner	Television film
1980	The Scarlett O'Hara War	Carole Lombard	Television film
1980	Revenge of the Stepford Wives	Kaye Foster	Television film
1981	The Miracle of Kathy Miller	Barbara Miller	Television film
1982	House Calls	Jane Jeffries	15 episodes
1982–1988	Cagney & Lacey	Det. Sgt. Christine Cagney	119 episodes Golden Globe Award for Best Actress – Television Series Drama; Primetime Emmy Award for Outstanding Lead Actress in a Drama Series (1986–1987); Viewers for Quality Television Award for Best Actress in a Quality Drama Series (1985–1988); Nominated—Golden Globe Award for Best Actress – Television Series Drama (1985, 1987–1989); Nominated—Primetime Emmy Award for Outstanding Lead Actress in a Drama Series (1983–1985, 1988)
1983	Tales of the Unexpected	Caroline Coates	Episode: "Youth from Vienna"
1983	Hobson's Choice	Maggie Hobson	Television film
1984	The Sky's No Limit	Joanna Douglas	Television film
1985	Letting Go	Kate	Television film
1989	The Outside Woman	Joyce Mattox	Television film
1990–1992	The Trials of Rosie O'Neill	Rosie O'Neill	26 episodes Golden Globe Award for Best Actress – Television Series Drama; Nominated—Golden Globe Award for Best Actress – Television Series Drama; Nominated—Primetime Emmy Award for Outstanding Lead Actress in a Drama Series (1991–1992)
1992	Honor Thy Mother	Bonnie Von Stein	Television film
1994	Separated by Murder	Various	Television film
1994	Cagney & Lacey: The Return	Christine Cagney-Burton	Television film
1995	Cagney & Lacey: Together Again	Christine Cagney-Burton	Television film
1995	Cagney & Lacey: The View Through the Glass Ceiling	Christine Cagney	Television film
1996	Cagney & Lacey: True Convictions	Christine Cagney	Television film
1997	Promised Land	Alex Tolan	2 episodes
1998	The Girl Next Door	Dr. Gayle Bennett	Television film
2000	Touched by an Angel	Ziggy	Episode: "The Perfect Game"
2000–2005	Queer as Folk	Debbie Novotny	79 episodes
2003	Judging Amy	Dr. Sally Godwin	Episode: "Maxine Interrupted"
2006	The State Within	Lynne Warner	6 episodes
2007–2013	Burn Notice	Madeline Westen	111 episodes Gracie Allen Award for Outstanding Supporting Actress in a Drama Series; Nominated—Primetime Emmy Award for Outstanding Supporting Actress in a Drama Series; Nominated—Satellite Award for Best Supporting Actress – Series, Miniseries or Television Film
2008–2009	Nip/Tuck	Colleen Rose	4 episodes Nominated—Primetime Emmy Award for Outstanding Guest Actress in a Drama Series
2016	Rizzoli & Isles	Inmate	Episode: "2M7258-100"
2016	The Exorcist	Chris MacNeil	4 episodes
2017	The Gifted	Ellen Strucker	2 episodes
2017–2020	Casualty	Zsa Zsa Harper-Jenkinson	4 episodes
2019	Constance	Raylynn	Television film
2023	Station 19	Dottie	Episode: "We Build Then We Break"

== Awards and nominations ==
Year	Award	Category	Title	Result
1983	Emmy Award	Primetime Emmy Award for Outstanding Lead Actress in a Drama Series	Cagney & Lacey	Nominated
1984	Emmy Award	Primetime Emmy Award for Outstanding Lead Actress in a Drama Series	Cagney & Lacey	Nominated
1985	Emmy Award	Primetime Emmy Award for Outstanding Lead Actress in a Drama Series	Cagney & Lacey	Nominated
1985	Golden Globe Award	Golden Globe Award for Best Actress – Television Series Drama	Cagney & Lacey	Nominated
1985	Viewers for Quality Television Awards	Best Actress in a Quality Drama Series	Cagney & Lacey	Won
1986	Emmy Award	Primetime Emmy Award for Outstanding Lead Actress in a Drama Series	Cagney & Lacey	Won
1986	Golden Globe Award	Golden Globe Award for Best Actress – Television Series Drama	Cagney & Lacey	Won
1986	Viewers for Quality Television Awards	Best Actress in a Quality Drama Series	Cagney & Lacey	Won
1987	Emmy Award	Primetime Emmy Award for Outstanding Lead Actress in a Drama Series	Cagney & Lacey	Won
1987	Viewers for Quality Television Awards	Best Actress in a Quality Drama Series	Cagney & Lacey	Won
1987	Golden Globe Award	Golden Globe Award for Best Actress – Television Series Drama	Cagney & Lacey	Nominated
1988	Emmy Award	Primetime Emmy Award for Outstanding Lead Actress in a Drama Series	Cagney & Lacey	Nominated
1988	Viewers for Quality Television Awards	Best Actress in a Quality Drama Series	Cagney & Lacey	Won
1988	Golden Globe Award	Golden Globe Award for Best Actress – Television Series Drama	Cagney & Lacey	Nominated
1989	Golden Globe Award	Golden Globe Award for Best Actress – Television Series Drama	Cagney & Lacey	Nominated
1991	Emmy Award	Primetime Emmy Award for Outstanding Lead Actress in a Drama Series	The Trials of Rosie O'Neill	Nominated
1991	Golden Globe Award	Golden Globe Award for Best Actress – Television Series Drama	The Trials of Rosie O'Neill	Won
1992	Emmy Award	Primetime Emmy Award for Outstanding Lead Actress in a Drama Series	The Trials of Rosie O'Neill	Nominated
1992	Golden Globe Award	Golden Globe Award for Best Actress – Television Series Drama	The Trials of Rosie O'Neill	Nominated
1995	Hollywood Walk of Fame	Star on the Walk of Fame at 7065 Hollywood Blvd		Won
2004	TV Land Awards	Favorite Crimestopper Duo	Cagney & Lacey	Nominated
2006	TV Land Awards	Coolest Crime Fighting Team	Cagney & Lacey	Nominated
2007	TV Land Awards	Favorite Lady Gumshoe	Cagney & Lacey	Nominated
2008	Emmy Award	Primetime Emmy Award for Outstanding Guest Actress in a Drama Series	Nip/Tuck	Nominated
2009	Madrid International Film Festival	Best Actress	Hannah Free	Won
2009	Film Out San Diego Audience Award	Best Actress in a Feature Film	Hannah Free	Won
2010	Gracie Award	Outstanding Female Actor in a Supporting Role in a Drama Series	Burn Notice	Won
2010	Satellite Award	Satellite Award for Best Supporting Actress – Series, Miniseries or Television Film	Burn Notice	Nominated
2010	Emmy Award	Primetime Emmy Award for Outstanding Supporting Actress in a Drama Series	Burn Notice	Nominated
