= Monique James =

American talent agent

Monique James (April 2, 1926 - January 18, 2001) was vice president of new talent for Universal Studios and a Hollywood talent agent who identified unknown actors and helped mentor and develop their careers in film, television, and theater.

== Early life and education ==
James was born April 2, 1926 in Paris, the daughter of New York Times managing editor Edwin L. James. She attended The Brearley School on the Upper East Side and graduated from Vassar College with a major in psychology and mathematics. She also acted on the post-war Broadway stage.

== Career ==
In 1948, she got a job with Eleanor Kilgallen in casting at CBS, although she didn't know how to type, and in 1949 she and Kilgallen formed Casting Consultants. At the time Kilgallen and James opened their business there were no programs from which Hollywood could find talent they needed. They initially mostly limited themselves to dramatic shows. When a show called Tales of Tomorrow needed some men who looked like they were from another planet, James found men no taller than five feet. When a dog was needed for a show they called actors who owned dogs to find one. They also streamlined the process for both actors and studio hiring teams by identifying a few actors who could meet the shows' needs, reducing the number of candidates casting directors had to sort through. In addition, they acted as agents for some more established actors at the time.

When MCA’s Lew Wasserman contacted her, she had clients Grace Kelly, Leslie Nielsen, and Felicia Montealegre. James and Kilgallen negotiated a deal with Wasserman, and they were later appointed vice presidents. After two years, James transferred to MCA’s Beverly Hills agency with a plan of staying for six months but never left. When MCA acquired Universal Studios, James and Kilgallen were given control of the New Talent Development Program, which was created in 1963.

In 1970, James had a contract list of 30 young actors and actresses. She said that stars young people were drawn to in the 1960s tended to be musicians, but in the 1970s they were more likely to be television and movie personalities, noting Lindsay Wagner in the ‘70s got the same kind of attention that Joan Baez did in the ‘60s. James was able to persuade most producers in Hollywood to consider one of her clients and was known for ghosting clients who didn’t listen to her advice. She would ask actors she was considering to prepare a scene and said she learned a lot about them and how they saw themselves based on what they chose. Even if people didn't have much acting experience, she could assess potential by noticing their voice and the way they moved, how they related to another person. She would read up to 17 movie and television scripts a weekend, noting she followed hunches when she chose actors to support describing them as the spark that is pure talent, part personality, part individuality, part ability to relate to an emotion or person, an ‘authority’ that tells her this person has what it takes to be noticed on screen. Some of the previously unknown actors she helped shepherd to stardom included Paul Newman, Robert Redford, Warren Beatty, Katharine Ross, Sharon Gless, and Jamie Lee Curtis.

Universal's New Talent Program was the last studio training course for young actors, and it closed in 1980. At this time James left Universal Studios and became personal manager for Gless and other performers.

== Personal life ==
James' married name was Prince, and she has one daughter Pam Prince. She died of cancer January 18, 2001.
