= Frank Ferrante =

American actor

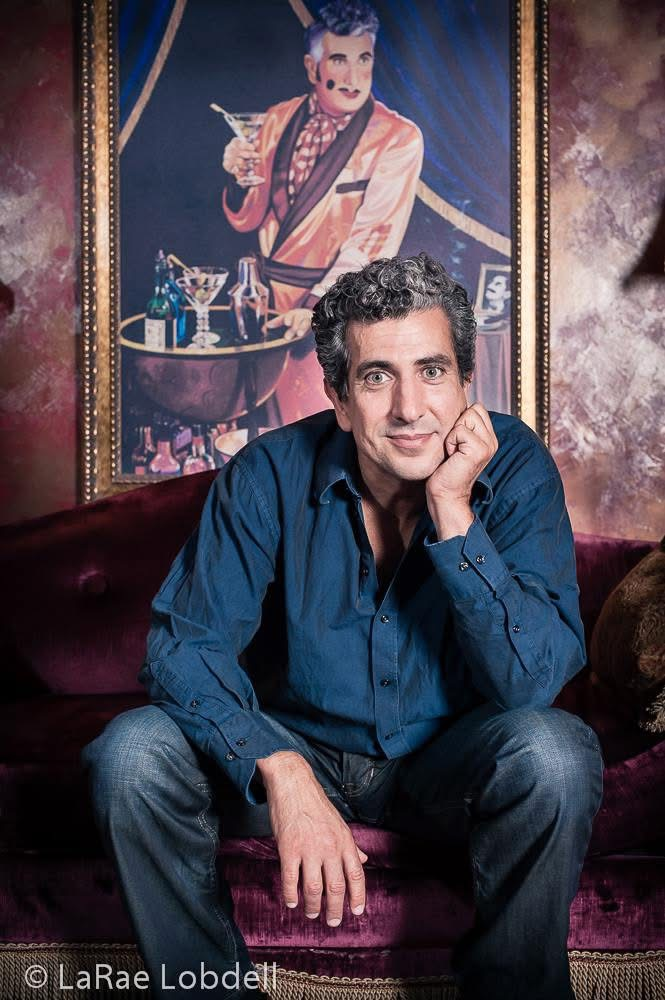
- Born: Frank Vincent Ferrante; 26 April 1963 (age 63); Los Angeles, California, U.S.
- Occupations: Actor; comedian; director

Frank Vincent Ferrante (born April 26, 1963) is an American stage actor, comedian and director known for his improvisation and audience interactive comedy. He has performed as Groucho Marx in the Arthur Marx/Robert Fisher play Groucho: A Life in Revue and in his own An Evening With Groucho. Ferrante was nominated for the Laurence Olivier Award for 'Comedy Performance of the Year' for the title role in Groucho: A Life in Revue in London's West End in 1987. He had previously won New York's 1987 Theatre World Award for 'Outstanding Debut' for the same role.

== Biography ==
Born in Los Angeles, Ferrante was raised in Sierra Madre, California by the offspring of Italian immigrants Dominic and Theresa (Torres) Ferrante. His father was a stockbroker; his mother was a housewife and preschool teacher. He attended Catholic schools including Christian Brothers-run La Salle High School in Pasadena, California where he first performed comedy. At eleven, Ferrante received his first paying theater job at the Sierra Madre Puppet Theater Workshop operating marionettes for puppeteer Virginia Austin Curtis who sculpted the ventriloquist doll Mortimer Snerd for Edgar Bergen.

== Career ==
While performing on campus in 1985, Ferrante was discovered by Groucho's son, the playwright Arthur Marx, when Ferrante was attending the University of Southern California Division of Drama. Ferrante went on to portray Groucho from age 15 to 85 in the New York City, London and PBS television versions of Arthur's play. Ferrante was 23 years old when Groucho: A Life in Revue opened off-Broadway at the Lucille Lortel Theatre in 1986.

Ferrante played the Groucho inspired roles Off-Broadway in The Cocoanuts in 1996 and regional productions of Animal Crackers at Goodspeed Opera House, The Huntington Theatre, Atlanta's Alliance Theatre, Paper Mill Playhouse and Arena Stage. In July 2018, Ferrante reprised his role in The Cocoanuts directing it for the Heritage Theatre Festival in Charlottesville.

Ferrante acts and directs throughout the regions most notably at Philadelphia's Walnut Street Theatre where he directed and developed the premiere of the Pulitzer Prize finalist Old Wicked Songs. At the Walnut, he directed Groucho: A Life in Revue playing the title role, the Sid Caesar-based character Max Prince in two productions of Neil Simon's Laughter On The 23rd Floor as well as directing Simon's Lost in Yonkers, The Sunshine Boys, Brighton Beach Memoirs, Biloxi Blues and Broadway Bound. At the Walnut in 2017, Ferrante directed and starred as Pseudolus in the Stephen Sondheim musical A Funny Thing Happened on the Way to the Forum and he was picked as a top ten performance of 2017 by The Wall Street Journal. In 2019, Ferrante returned to the Walnut Street Theatre to direct and play the lead Tito Merelli in Ken Ludwig's A Comedy of Tenors. There Ferrante also starred as playwright/director George S. Kaufman in the one-man play entitled By George written by Ferrante.

Since 2001, Ferrante has performed his improvisationally based comedy in the European style cirque show Teatro ZinZanni playing an outrageous Latin lover named Caesar. In ZinZanni, Ferrante played opposite legendary cabaret star Liliane Montevecchi, Joan Baez, Sally Kellerman and The Motels' Martha Davis. Ferrante spent years performing the role in San Francisco, Seattle, Amsterdam and Chicago. Critic Chris Jones of the Chicago Tribune chose Ferrante's performance as The Caesar at Teatro ZinZanni as one of the 'top ten' of 2019. As a voice actor in animation, Ferrante played Lyman in a 2012 special of The Garfield Show. In 2015, he played the role of Stockholder Eel in the SpongeBob SquarePants episode The Executive Treatment, in which the character references Groucho Marx. Ferrante guest starred as a talking mime in Robert Corrdry's Emmy Award-winning Adult Swim series Childrens Hospital. In 2007, he became a question on the television program Jeopardy!. Ferrante currently stars as The Caesar in the YouTube series All Hail Caesar: An American Love Story.

== Awards and nominations ==
- 1987 New York Theater World Award (For Outstanding New Talent)
- 1987 New York Outer Critics Circle Nomination (Most Striking Debut)
- 1987 Laurence Olivier Award Nomination (Comedy Performance of the Year)
- 1992 Connecticut Critics Circle Award (Best Actor in a Musical)
- 1999 Connecticut Critics Circle Award (Best Actor in a Play)
- 1999 Helen Hayes Award Nomination (Best Actor in a Musical)
