= Groucho: A Life in Revue =

1987 stage play

Groucho: A Life in Revue is a stage play written by Groucho Marx's son Arthur Marx and Robert Fisher. With musical direction by Jim Grady. It is a look at the life and career of the famous entertainer Groucho Marx of the Marx Brothers and You Bet Your Life fame. It opened off-Broadway at the Lucille Lortel Theatre on October 8, 1986, and played 254 performances closing on May 3, 1987. It starred 23-year-old actor Frank Ferrante as Groucho Marx from age 15 to 85, Les Marsden as Harpo Marx and Chico Marx, Faith Prince as The Girls, and Rusty Magee as The Citizen of Freedonia. The revue was produced by Nancy and Ronnie Horowitz, and directed by Arthur Marx.

== Versions ==
The production opened with Ferrante and Marsden in London's West End at the Comedy Theatre in 1987. Marguerite Lowell replaced Faith Prince as The Girls. In 1982, Gabe Kaplan filmed an earlier version of the play, called simply Groucho, for television co-starring Connie Danese and Michael Tucci. In 2001, Groucho aired as a national television special on PBS starring Frank Ferrante as Groucho, Roy Abramsohn as Chico and Harpo, and Marguerite Lowell as The Girls. It was directed for the stage by Ferrante and for the screen by Steve Moscovic.

== Critical reception ==
The play opened to rave reviews. The New York Times wrote, "There is laughter in abundance" and described Ferrante's performance as "artful... his timing is digital sharp." The New York Post dubbed it "hilarious...a brilliant revue."

== Awards and honours ==
Groucho was nominated for two NY Outer Critics Circle Awards - one for Best Play and one for Ferrante's performance. Ferrante won a 1987 New York Theatre World Award for 'Outstanding New Talent.' The play received more critical acclaim and garnered three Laurence Olivier Award nominations.
