= Wendy Kaplan =

American actress

- Occupation: Actress
- Years active: 1987–2017

Wendy Kaplan is a film, television, and stage actress probably best known for her role as Tina Williams in the 1989 horror movie Halloween 5: The Revenge of Michael Myers.

== Career ==
She is best known for her role in the 1989 horror movie Halloween 5: The Revenge of Michael Myers as Tina Williams. Kaplan's most recent film role is in the 2017 movie The Labyrinth. Kaplan appeared on the soap opera Guiding Light as Eleni Andros Spauding Cooper from 1994-1995. She played the wife of Brian Wilson in the 1990 TV-movie Summer Dreams: The Story of the Beach Boys. Kaplan made guest appearances on Alien Nation, Law & Order, Police Story, and My Two Dads among others. She has performed major roles in diverse regional theater productions.

In recent years, Kaplan has appeared in numerous TV commercials for a variety of products.

== Filmography ==
Film
Year	Title	Role	Notes
1989	Halloween 5: The Revenge of Michael Myers	Tina Williams	Credited as Wendy Kaplan
2005	Blood Deep	Katie's Mom	Credited as Wendy Kaplan
2011	The Mischievous Case of Cordelia Botkin	Ida Deane	Short film
2014	Homecoming	Mom	
2017	The Labyrinth	Sam's Mother	
Television
Year	Title	Role	Notes
1987	My Two Dads	Karen Spielhaus	1 episode: "The Artful Dodger"; credited as Wendy Kaplan
1988	Police Story: Monster Manor	Laurie Lee	Television film; credited as Wendy Kaplan
1989	Live-In		1 episode: "It Takes Two to Tutor"; credited as Wendy Kaplan
1989	Alien Nation	Beth Meadows	1 episode: "Fountain of Youth"; credited as Wendy Kaplan
1990	Summer Dreams: The Story of the Beach Boys	Marilyn Wilson	Television film; credited as Wendy Kaplan
1994-1995	Guiding Light	Eleni Andros Spaulding Cooper #2	
