= The Last Winter =

The Last Winter can refer to:

- The Last Winter (1960 film), a 1960 Danish film
- The Last Winter (1984 film), a 1984 film
- The Last Winter (1989 film), a 1989 Canadian film directed by Aaron Kim Johnston
- The Last Winter (2006 film), a 2006 film
