= Stephen Macht =

American television and film actor (born 1942)

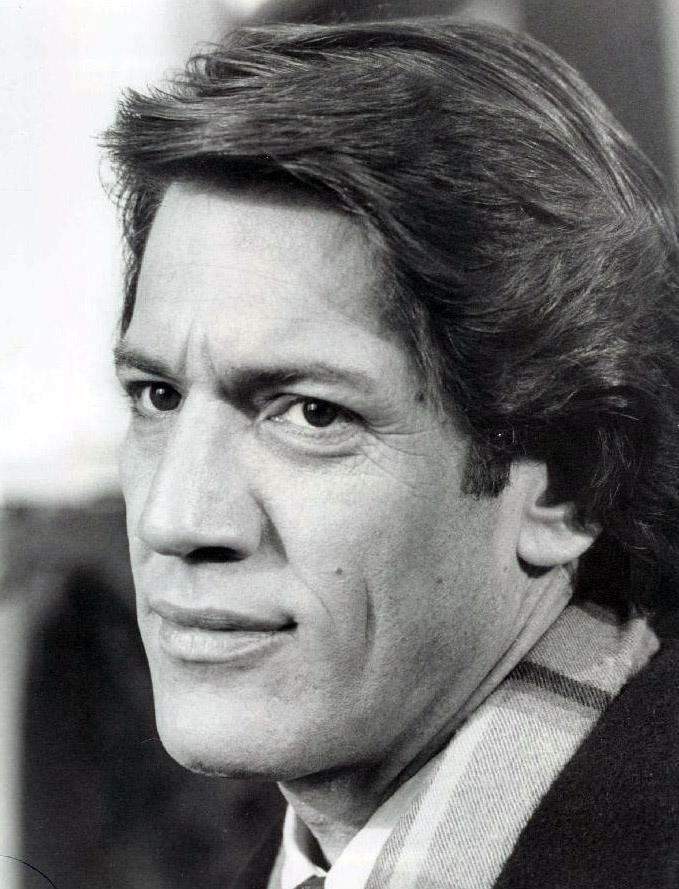
- Macht in 1981
- Born: Stephen Robert Macht; May 1, 1942 (age 84); Philadelphia, Pennsylvania, U.S.
- Occupation: Actor
- Years active: 1973–2019
- Spouse: Suzanne Pulier (m. 1964)
- Children: 4, including Gabriel
- Relatives: Jacinda Barrett (daughter-in-law)

Stephen Robert Macht (born May 1, 1942) is an American actor, rabbi, and professor.

== Early life and education ==
Macht was born in Philadelphia, Pennsylvania, to Jewish parents Janette and Jerome Irving Macht. He is of Russian Jewish descent. He was raised in Brooklyn Heights, New York until, at age nine, his father died and he moved with his mother and older brother, to live with his maternal grandfather, a haberdasher, in Mystic, Connecticut.

Macht received a bachelor's degree from Dartmouth College, a masters from Tufts University, and a doctorate in dramatic literature from Indiana University from 1965 to 1968. He attended the London Academy of Music and Dramatic Art. Macht taught at Smith College and was a tenured professor at Queens College.

In 2013, Macht earned a master's degree in Jewish Studies at the Academy for Jewish Religion and became an ordained rabbi.

== Career ==
Spotted by a Universal Studios talent scout while performing at the Stratford Shakespeare Festival in Canada in 1975, Macht was signed to a contract and by the mid-1970s had left teaching and was making frequent appearances in TV episodes and movies.

In Raid on Entebbe (1977), he portrayed Yoni Netanyahu, the Israeli officer killed in the rescue of hostages in Uganda. In 1978, he had a lead role in The Immigrants, a syndicated miniseries about the rise of the son of Italian immigrants in turn-of-the-century San Francisco and, also in 1978, the role of German boxing champion Max Schmeling alongside Bernie Casey's Joe Louis in NBC's made-for-TV movie Ring of Passion.

After his appearance in the television movie American Dream (ABC, 1981) he was cast in a short-lived series which cast Macht in the role of a family man who chucks the suburban life to set up home in the inner city of Chicago. The following season, he landed the role of Joe Cooper, brother of Karen MacKenzie (Michele Lee), on Knots Landing (CBS, 1982–83). Other notable roles included playing Nancy McKeon's father in Strange Voices (NBC, 1987). He was Benedict Arnold in the miniseries George Washington (1984) and played one of the survivors of an air crash in Flight 90: Disaster on the Potomac (NBC, 1984). He spent three seasons (1985–88) as David Keeler, love interest to Cagney (Sharon Gless), on Cagney & Lacey (CBS). During his run on the show, he moved behind the cameras to make his directorial debut. In 1993, Macht played Krim Aldos in "The Siege", an early Season 2 episode of Star Trek: Deep Space Nine. Macht had been Gene Roddenberry's first choice to play Captain Jean-Luc Picard in Star Trek: The Next Generation, but the role eventually went to Patrick Stewart in 1986.

Later credits have included playing an Austrian Jew who must be baptized along with his wife and daughter in order to escape the Nazis in A Friendship in Vienna (1988 The Disney Channel); a doctor helping Jane Seymour in the syndicated miniseries Sidney Sheldon's Memories of Midnight (1991), and as cult member Joan Van Ark's suffering husband in Moment of Truth: A Mother's Deception (1994 NBC). Macht appeared in the 1995 third season Babylon 5 episode "A Day in the Strife" as the character 'Na'Far'. Na'Far was the new official Narn representative, replacing G'Kar, after the Centauri's invasion of the Narn homeworld. In 1996 he did a six-month stint on the ABC daytime drama One Life to Live as Elliot Durban. From August 24, 2007, to February 13, 2009, he portrayed Trevor Lansing, attorney of organized crime boss Anthony Zacchara and father of attorney Ric Lansing, in the soap opera General Hospital for which Soap Opera Digest nominated him Best Villain of 2007. In 2014, 2015, 2016 and 2019, Macht guest starred opposite his son, actor Gabriel Macht, in Suits.

Macht's work in feature films has included The Choirboys (1977). He also had roles in: Nightwing (1979), The Mountain Men (1980), Galaxina (1980), The Last Winter (1984), The Monster Squad (1987), Stephen King's Graveyard Shift (1990), Amityville: It's About Time (1992), The Legend of Galgameth (1996), and Watchers Reborn (1998). Macht has also played Dr. Harris in three installments of the Trancers series of films.

== Personal life ==
Macht has been married to Suzanne Victoria Pulier, an archivist and museum curator, since 1964. They have four children: Julie, Ari Serbin, actor Gabriel and Jesse, a musician. Macht is also an ordained rabbi; and his book Moral Change: a Tragedy or a Return?: How Aristotle’s Tragic Reversal Illuminates Maimonides’ Teshuva was published on Amazon.com in October 2016.

== Filmography ==
Year	Title	Role	Notes
1977	The Choirboys	Spencer Van Moot	
1977	Raid on Entebbe	Lieutenant Colonel Yonatan "Yoni" Netanyahu	
1979	Nightwing	Walker Chee	
1980	The Mountain Men	Heavy Eagle	
1980	Galaxina	Sgt. Thor	
1980	Enola Gay: The Men, the Mission, the Atomic Bomb	Major William "Bud" Uanna	
1982	Knots Landing	Joe Cooper	Recurring guest role in Season 3 (13 episodes)
1984	The Last Winter	Eddie	
1984	CBS Schoolbreak Special	Bob Anastas	Episode: "Contract for Life: The S.A.D.D. Story"
1985	Scarecrow and Mrs. King	Paul Barnes	Episode: "We're Off to See the Wizard"
1986	Blacke's Magic	Lt. Hank Wallenstein	Episode: "Ten Tons of Trouble"
1987	The Monster Squad	Del	
1989	Columbo	David Kincaid	Episode: "Sex and the Married Detective"
1990	Graveyard Shift	Warwick	
1992	Highlander: The Series	Alexei Voshin	Episode: "The Sea Witch"
1992	Amityville: It's About Time	Jacob Sterling	
1993	Star Trek: Deep Space Nine	General Krim	Episode: "The Circle"
1993	Star Trek: Deep Space Nine	General Krim	Episode: "The Siege"
1995	Babylon 5	Na'Far	Episode: "A Day in the Strife"
1996	Galgameth	El El	
1997	Touch Me	Robert	
1998	JAG	James Gribaldi	Episode: "The Imposter"
1998	Watchers Reborn	Lem Johnson	
1999	Sliders	Krislov	Episode: "New Gods For Old"
1999	Swallows	Hank	
1999	Final Voyage	Captain Doyle	
2000	Agent Red	General Stillwell	
2002	Outside the Law	Dick Dawson	
2008	The Legend of Bloody Mary	Magistrate	
2011-2012	Femme Fatales	Leland Ryan	3 episodes
2012	Atlas Shrugged: Part II	Clem Weatherby	
2013	The Mentalist	Hollis Percy	Episode: "Red Letter Day"
2015-2019	Suits	Henry Gerard	5 episodes
