= The School for Wives =

1662 theatrical comedy by Molière

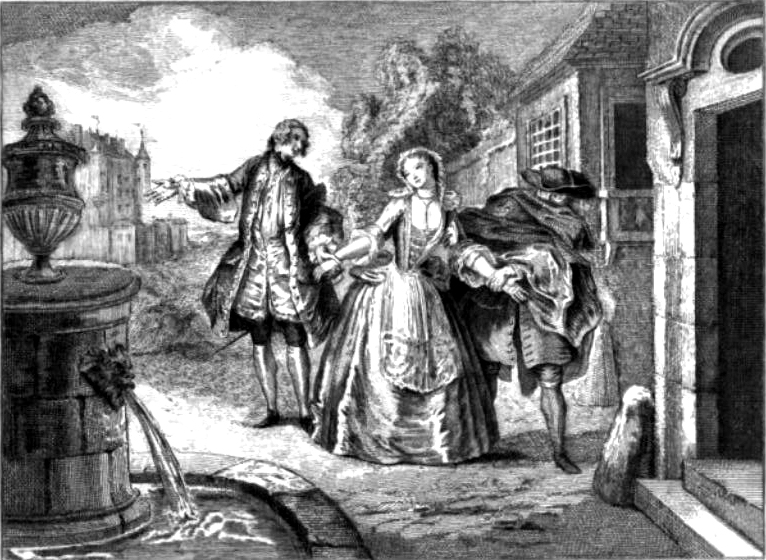
Front page of L'École des femmes—engraving from the 1719 edition

The School for Wives (French: L'école des femmes; pronounced [lekɔl de fam]) is a theatrical comedy written by the seventeenth-century French playwright Molière and considered by some critics to be one of his finest achievements. It was first staged at the Palais Royal theatre on 26 December 1662 for the brother of the King. The play depicts a character who is so intimidated by femininity that he resolves to marry his young, naïve ward and proceeds to make clumsy advances to this purpose. It raised some outcry from the public and established Molière as a bold playwright who would not be afraid to write about controversial issues. In June 1663, the playwright cunningly responded to the uproar with another piece entitled La Critique de L'École des femmes, which provided some insight into his unique style of comedy.

== Sources ==
Molière drew inspiration for the play from a Spanish novella by María de Zayas y Sotomayor titled El prevenido engañado (1637), which Paul Scarron had translated into French and adapted in 1655 under the title La Précaution inutile; the same novella was translated again the following year by Antoine Le Métel d'Ouville, under the same title. From these two translations, apart from a few phrases taken verbatim, Molière retained the general idea of the man who, believing that wit makes women frivolous and unfaithful, has a young girl raised in the most complete ignorance of the things of the world before marrying her, and who, despite this precaution, finds himself deceived by her. Another play adapted from this story, titled L'École des cocus, had already been staged in 1659.

== Characters and scene ==
The characters are:

- Arnolphe, a bachelor who also uses the noble-sounding name of Monsieur de la Souche
- Agnès, his innocent teenage ward
- Alain, a peasant who is one of his servants
- Georgette, a peasant who is another of his servants
- Chrysalde, one of his friends
- Horace, a young man in love with Agnès
- Oronte, another friend of Arnolphe's, and father of Horace
- Enrique, Chrysalde's brother-in-law, and father of Agnès

The scene is a square in a provincial town.

== Plot ==
Arnolphe, the protagonist, is a mature man who has groomed the young Agnès since she was 4 years old. Arnolphe supports Agnès living in a nunnery until the age of 17, when he moves her to one of his abodes, which he keeps under the name of Monsieur de la Souche. Arnolphe's intention is to bring up Agnès in such a manner that she will be too ignorant to be unfaithful to him and he becomes obsessed with avoiding this fate. To this end, he forbids the nuns who are instructing her from teaching her anything that might lead her astray. Right from the very first scene, a friend of his, Chrysalde, warns Arnolphe that such a scheme will likely fail, but Arnolphe takes no heed.

After Agnès moves into Arnolphe's house, Arnolphe meets by chance Horace, the young son of Arnolphe's friend Oronte, whom Arnolphe had not seen in years. Not realizing that Arnolphe and Monsieur de la Souche are the same person, Horace unwittingly confides to Arnolphe he had been visiting Agnès for the past week while the master of the house, one Monsieur de la Souche, was away. Arnolphe then schemes to outmaneuver Horace and to ensure that Agnès will marry him.

Arnolphe becomes more and more frustrated as the play goes on. Agnès continues to meet with Horace despite Arnolphe's displeasure until, finally, a misunderstanding leads Arnolphe to believe that Agnès has agreed to marry him and Agnès to believe that Arnolphe has given her permission to marry Horace. When they realize the actual situation, Arnolphe forbids Agnès from seeing Horace. Horace, in his distress, comes to Arnolphe, asking for his help in rescuing Agnès from "Monsieur de la Souche".

In the final act Oronte and Enrique arrive and announce that Horace is to marry Enrique's daughter. The daughter turns out to be Agnès, rendering all of Arnolphe's scheming useless.

== Reception and significance ==
In the small but culturally significant world of Parisian theatre, the play created a sensation. Comedy had been looked down on by the intellectual élite as a minor genre, lacking dignity and solidity, until Molière replaced its fantastical characters and plots with individuals and situations close to real life. Talking of the stage, he said:

You've achieved nothing if you don't get people of today to recognise themselves.

While his characters may have the dramatic necessity of one overriding trait, the more important ones have added complexity and even ambiguity. Supreme perhaps is the tantalising opacity of Agnès, who herself says very little in the play but has left readers and viewers intrigued ever since over how innocent she really is.

== Twentieth-century theatrical productions ==
- The Compagnie Jouvet of Paris staged the play at the first Edinburgh International Festival in 1947.
- Let Wives Tak Tent, a free translation into Scots by Robert Kemp, was first performed at the Gateway Theatre in Edinburgh in 1948.
- First produced on Broadway, performed in French, with Louis Jouvet at the ANTA Playhouse from 18 March to 3 April 1951.
- A production using the Richard Wilbur translation was staged at the Lyceum Theatre, on Broadway from 16 February to 29 May 1971, directed by Stephen Porter, with cast members Brian Bedford as Arnolphe, Joan Van Ark as Agnes, and David Dukes as Horace.
- Hustruskolan, a 1983 Swedish TV production of the play directed by Ingmar Bergman. It starred Allan Edwall as Arnolphe, Lena Nyman as Agnes, and Stellan Skarsgård as Horace.
- A nök iskolája, a 1984 Hungarian TV movie based on the play, directed by György Fehér.
- In 1995 the National Asian American Theater Company staged it, where Arloa Reston and Daniel Dae-Kim were praised for their performances as Agnes and Horace respectively.

== Audio recordings ==
- The play was adapted for audio in 1965 by Daniel Bernet, in a production directed by Bertrand Jérome, with music by Michel Puig, starring François Périer as Arnolfe, issued on the Sonores Bordas label.
- In 1971, Caedmon Records recorded and released on LP (TRS 344) a production originally performed at the Lyceum Theatre in New York City using the Richard Wilbur translation and directed by Stephen Porter. The cast included Brian Bedford as Arnolphe, Joan Van Ark as Agnes and David Dukes as Horace. This recording has not to date been re-released on CD.
- In 2009, L.A. Theatre Works recorded a production using the Richard Wilbur translation (ISBN 1-58081-384-4) featuring William Brown as Arnolphe and Judy Greer as Agnes.

== See also ==
- Iceberg (short story)
