= Iceberg (short story) =

French detective short story

- Short story by Fred Kassak
- Language: French
- Genre: Crime fiction

Publication
- Publisher: Week-end: le magazine du tiercé
- Publication date: 18 January 1964

Chronology
- Series: Classiques & Contemporains
St Valentin	Qui a tué Joris Hoorn ?

"Iceberg" is a French-language detective short story written by the French novelist Fred Kassak. The work was first published on 18 January 1964 in the magazine Week-end: le magazine du tiercé. It is now included in the book Nouvelles à chute, published by Magnard in the Classiques & Contemporains collection.

This is the story of a man (Bernard) who falls in love with a young woman (Irène) and seeks to get rid of what he considers his rival (Georges). The story reveals the true identity of this latter at the end: Georges is Irène’s son.

Recognized by critics, "Iceberg" is a reference among detective short stories and studied in French middle and high schools (collège and lycée).

== Summary ==
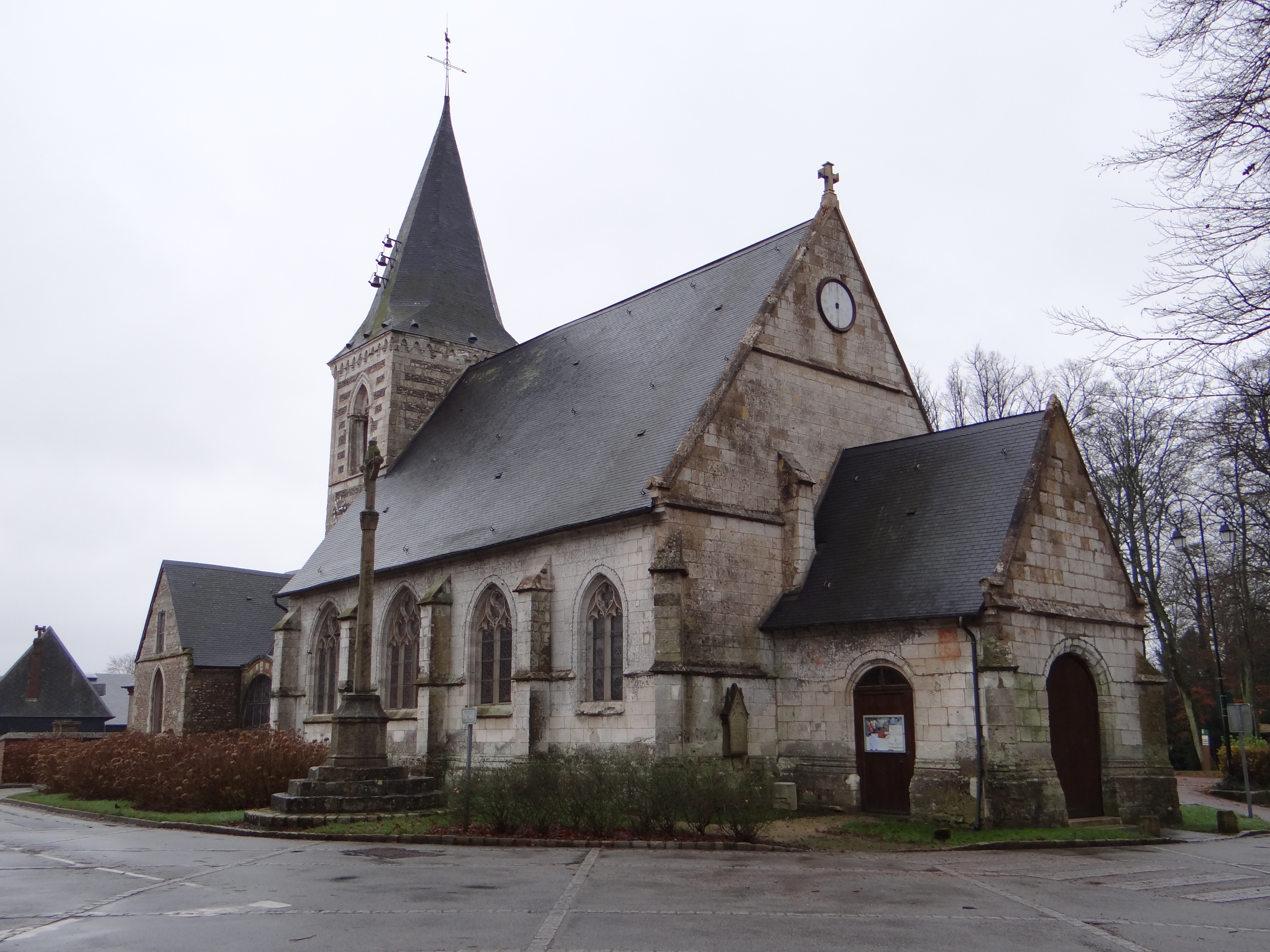
The story is set in the village of Bouville.

The story takes place in autumn on the Channel coast, in Bouville.

The narrator, Bernard, falls in love with a young woman, Irène. He remembers the day he met her in minute detail. Bernard wants to spend the rest of his with her, but the presence of a man named Georges, who lives with Irène, seems to be an obstacle to their relationship. Bernard wants to attract Irène's attention, but she only gives it to Georges.

Jealous, Bernard premeditates Georges’ murder. Like every weekend, he invites Irène to hang out and admire the landscapes of Normandy, but as expected, she agrees only on the condition that Georges comes with them. After Irène blocks the vehicle's brake to reach the toposcope they usually use, Bernard deliberately releases the brake pedal while Georges is there. The car picks up speed and heads straight for the cliff edge. Irène rushes to Georges' rescue and saves him at the last moment. While the identity of the latter remained unclear and led the reader to believe that Georges was an adult man, it is only at this moment that the reader understands that the vehicle is a pram and that Georges turns out to be, through his cries and tears, an infant and Irène's child.

== Publication ==
The short story was first published by Fred Kassak on Saturday 18 January 1964 in Week-end: le magazine du tiercé.

In 1989, Fred Kassak's work joined that of eight other writers, all published in Le Masque vous donne de ses nouvelles by Editions du Masque. Six years later, the same publisher released Qui a peur d'Ed Garpo?, a collection of ten short stories by Fred Kassak, including Iceberg.

In June 2004, "Iceberg" and five other short stories appeared in Nouvelles à chute, published by Magnard in the Classiques & Contemporains collection.

== Analysis ==
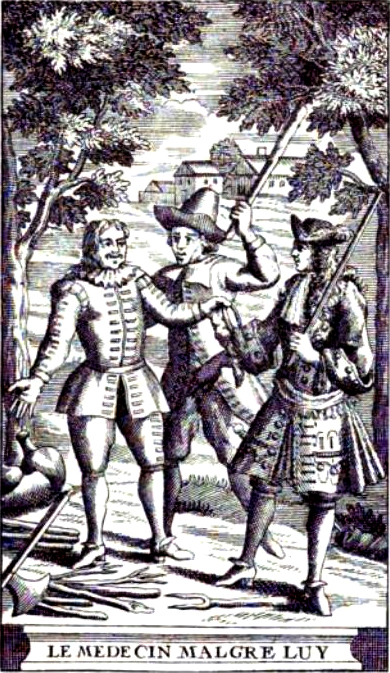
Sganarelle confronts Valère and Lucas, in Le Médecin malgré lui (act I, scene 5).

The short story belongs to the realistic and detective genres.

Its title, "Iceberg", could evoke the coldness between the two characters, Bernard and Georges.

The story is entirely written in the first person. The beginning of the story is said to be in media res (in the middle of the action), followed by regular flashbacks, which aim to blur the tracks and effectively lead to the story's climax. The reader then becomes a detective as they have to construct the story based on the information they gather. All the elements of the detective story are gathered: the reason (Bernard's jealousy), the weapon (the car), and the crime (the attempted murder).

Rhythmed with marks of humor, the impossible love between Irène and Bernard is the misunderstanding on which the short story is based. Professors Nathalie Lebailly and Matthieu Gamard compare the use of the misunderstanding device in this short story to that used by Molière. It can notably be found in The School for Wives (Act I, Scene 4) where Arnolphe, determined to marry his ward Agnès, meets Horace, who has also fallen for the same woman. Molière adopts the same practice in Le Médecin malgré lui (Act I, Scene 5) where Valère and Lucas, the servants of Géronte, are looking for a doctor for their master's daughter and Martine designates Sganarelle as an experienced doctor.

Fred Kassak increasingly sows clues about Georges' identity throughout the story: he cannot stand the sun heat; he remains silent; Bernard describes him as "a half-bald runt"; he is indifferent to everything Irène does for him; he stays inside the car and does not go to admire the sea; finally, Georges cries out and Irène rocks him to calm him down.

The short story is brief as it contains a simple plot and few characters. The vocabulary used is mostly colloquial, but Fred Kassak sometimes varies it with terms from everyday and formal language.

== Reception ==
Jean-Claude Alizet describes the short story as “a model of a twist ending." According to Delphine Lahary, "Iceberg" reveals an "atmosphere of suspense and mystery" and is a story likely to interest young readers. According to the French writer David Bellos, "Iceberg" is "a spectacular short story." For Jennifer Wagner, "Bernard's jealousy towards the relationship between Irène and Georges plays a driving role in the story."

== Pedagogical use ==
In France, "Iceberg" is the subject of readings and analyses at the middle and high school levels. From a literary standpoint, studying the short story requires attentiveness to the lexical and pronominal substitutes used. Students must make hypotheses, interpret the text, and guess its twist ending. The ambiguity of the text aims to introduce students to a new approach to literary discourse. The author himself hinted that he found this pedagogical use of his short story somewhat unflattering.

== Notes and references ==
1. Lahary 2001–2002, p. 10.
2. Kassak, Fred (1964-01-18). "Iceberg". Week-end: Le magazine du tiercé (in French) (71): 16–17.
3. "Le Masque vous donne de ses nouvelles". Livrenpoche. Archived from the original on November 4, 2016.
4. Ledur, Dominique; De Croix, Séverine (2007). Repérer et analyser les difficultés rencontrées par les élèves réputés " faibles lecteurs " au collège : propositions de tâches écrites pour l'évaluation et la formation du lecteur (PDF). Institut français de l'éducation. p. 147.
5. Wagner, Jennifer (2012). Great French Short Stories of the Twentieth Century (in French). Courier Corporation. p. 39. ISBN 978-0-486-47623-0. Archived from the original on February 2, 2021.
6. "Nouvelles à chute". Classiques et contemporains Magnard (in French). Archived from the original on November 29, 1998.
7. Lebailly & Gamard 2004, p. 18.
8. Lahary 2001–2002, p. 12.
9. Lebailly & Gamard 2004, pp. 15–16.
10. Lahary 2001–2002, p. 5.
11. Alizet, Jean-Claude (1990). "L'année 1989 du polar, de la S.F., du fantastique et de l'espionnage: bibliographie critique courante de l'autre-littérature". Encrage (in French). Travaux (8): 327. ISBN 978-2-906389-24-3.
12. Bellos, David (2004). "Le goût de la forme en littérature : écritures et lectures à contraintes: Colloque de Cerisy, 14-21 août 2001". Noésis (in French). Formules (9): 306. ISBN 978-2-914645-50-8. Archived from the original on January 26, 2023.
13. Leclair 2001.
14. Lahary 2001–2002.
15. Legeard, Emmanuel (May 6, 2018). "Hommage au regretté Fred Kassak". Causeur (in French).

=== Bibliography ===
- Lahary, Delphine (2001–2002). La lecture en classe de 2de, défi et stratégies (Document used to write the article) (in French). Académie de Montpellier.
- Lebailly, Nathalie; Gamard, Matthieu (2004). Nouvelles à chute: Livret du professeur (PDF) (Document used to write the article) (in French). Vol. Classiques & Contemporains. Magnard. Archived from the original (PDF) on February 22, 2016.
- Leclair, James (2001). "Bonnes nouvelles !… pour les troisièmes". Approches du discours littéraire au collège (Document used to write the article) (in French). Vol. Lettres ouvertes. Rennes: Centre régional de documentation pédagogique de Bretagne. pp. 65–67.
