= Jodelet astrologue =

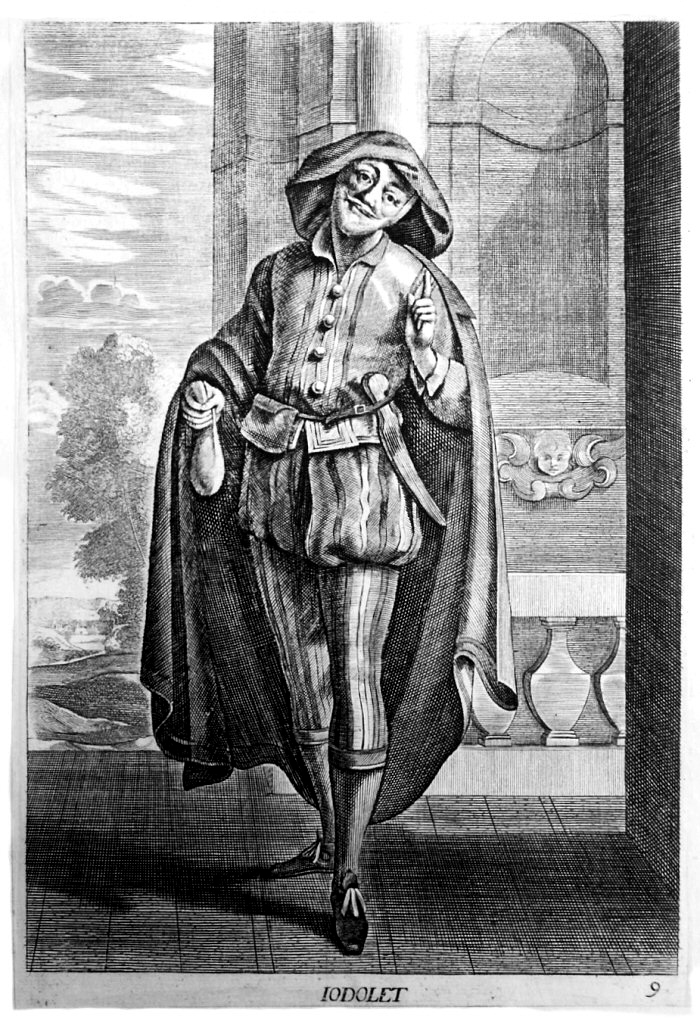
Jodelet

Jodelet astrologue is a French five-act comedy in verse by Antoine Le Metel, sieur d'Ouville, created for the 17th-century comic actor Jodelet and premiered at the Théâtre du Marais in 1646.

== Plot ==
Jodelet holds from Nise, the maid he loves, love secrets of several suitors and their beauties and since "the language of a valet is worse than a trumpet", but the secrets are soon disclosed.

The unfortunate Nise is ruthlessly hunted by her mistress, but Jodelet has more than one trick in his bag and saves the day: he says he is an astrologer and claims to hold from the revelation of the stars everything Nise told him.

The comedy becomes a satire against astrologers and soothsayers who retailed their nonsense to Parisian onlookers.

== Commentary ==
Thomas Corneille would draw inspiration from that play to write his Feint Astrologue in 1648, with the difference that Corneille gave the role of the so-called astrologer to the master instead of the servant to make all the incidents of the play more likely, and his Devineresse in 1679.
