= Matthew Walker (American actor) =

American film actor and director

Matthew D. Walker
- Born: October 12, 1968 (age 57); Santa Monica, California, U.S.
- Occupations: Actor, director
- Years active: 1986–present
- Notable work: Dinner and a Movie; Supercarrier; Halloween 5: The Revenge of Michael Myers, Child's Play 3

Matthew D. Walker (born October 12, 1968) is an American film and television actor and television director.

== Life and career ==
Walker was born in Santa Monica, California. He has been acting professionally since the age of 17, when he appeared in a Disney Movie of the Week in 1986. Since then he has made his living appearing in numerous television shows, feature films, commercials, and live venues across the country. At age 19 he was cast as a series regular on the ABC drama Supercarrier, starring Wendie Malick, Paul Gleason and Richard Jaeckel. Co-starring roles soon followed in the feature films Halloween 5: The Revenge of Michael Myers and Child's Play 3, which established Walker in the famed slasher movie sequel genre.

In Hollywood as a young actor, Walker worked with such notable actors as Kate Hudson, Melanie Griffith, John Goodman, Lea Thompson, Andy Dick, Tony Danza, Martin Mull, Haysha Deitsch, Donald Pleasence, Willford Brimley, John Ritter, and George C. Scott, and such directors as Tobe Hooper, James Burrows, and Garry Marshall. In 1995, Walker was cast as a series regular in the Fox sitcom The Preston Episodes with David Alan Grier, and as the star of a CBS pilot called Shock Treatment. The publicity from these two shows landed Walker with the William Morris Talent Agency, but acting roles began to dry up. That same year, Walker accepted a job as the director of a TBS cable television show, Dinner and a Movie. That job turned into more directing for TBS including the shows Movies For Guys Who Like Movies, The Man Made Movie, Movie & A Makeover and Big PlayStation Saturday. Six years and over 200 episodes later, Walker had worked with more of Hollywood's top shelf talent, including Kelsey Grammer, Joan Cusack, Jon Cryer, Beverly D'Angelo, John C. McGinley, John Travolta, Bridget Fonda, Danny DeVito, Morgan Freeman, Ray Liotta and Arnold Schwarzenegger.

During his stint as a director and while he was still represented by WMA, Walker decided to run away and join the circus. In 1997 he left Los Angeles and was accepted into Ringling Bros. and Barnum & Bailey's Clown College on a full scholarship. For three months, seven days a week, 14 hours a day, Walker was trained in the circus arts, including clowning, acrobatics, stilt walking, make-up, mime, dance, prop building, and juggling. This led to a contract as a clown with the Greatest Show on Earth. Traveling across the country on the circus train, Walker performed in venues including The Cotton Bowl at the Texas State Fair, The United Center in Chicago, and The L.A. Sports Arena.

After the circus, Walker was more committed than ever to bringing a purely physical, musical, and improvisational style of theater to Los Angeles. Having studied previously with Second City Improvisation, the San Francisco Mime Troupe, and renowned clown Bill Irwin, Walker assembled a multi-talented group of actors, musicians, writers and acrobats, and the Troubadour Theater Company was born. Having recently celebrated its 10th year, Troubadour has evolved into one of Los Angeles' most critically acclaimed comic troupes. Original productions include Fleetwood Macbeth, It's A Stevie Wonderful Life, Twelfth Dog Night and Christmas Carole King.

Walker's theater career includes performing in over 100 stage plays and musicals at venues such as La Mirada Theater, Grove Shakespeare, International City Theater, Pasadena Playhouse, the John Anson Ford Amphitheater, the Sarasota Opera House, the Lobero Theater, San Diego Repertory Theater, and the Dorothy Chandler Pavilion with the Los Angeles Opera.

Walker is currently an adjunct professor of Clowning and Commedia dell'arte at the University of California at San Diego for their graduate acting program, and continues as a director of television for Norsemen Productions in Valley Village, California, directing such shows as Saturday Night Solution for Court TV, and The Dude Room for the Discovery Channel.

Most recently, Walker collaborated with Universal Studios Creative on a theme park show for their Islands of Adventure Park; directed a world premiere musical, Million Dollar Quartet, at Daytona's Seaside Music Theater; and is currently serving as associate director for Garry Marshall's world premiere musical, Happy Days.

== Awards ==
His awards include:

- BackStage West
- Robbie Awards
- LA Weekly Theater Award
- Orange County Weekly
- Los Angeles Drama Critics Circle Award (Direction)
- L.A. Stage Alliance (Ovation Award)
- Silver Telly (Direction)

== Filmography ==
=== Film ===
Year	Title	Role	Notes
2016	Mother's Day	Randy	
2009	Grande Drip	Keith Glassco	
2008	Disaster!: A Major Motion Picture Ride...Starring You!	Mikey	Universal Studios Florida attraction. Also Director.
2005	Absolute Zero	Hershel	TV
2004	The Princess Diaries 2: Royal Engagement	Captain Kip Kelly	
2004	Raising Helen	Fashion Show Security	
1997	Strategic Command	Brier	
1995	Shock Treatment	The Shock	TV
1995	A Dangerous Affair	Unknown	TV
1994	Guardian Angel	Lippy	
1994	Moment of Truth: A Mother's Deception	Doctor Jaffe	TV
1994	In the Army Now	Stoner #2	
1991	Deception: A Mother's Secret	Salesman	TV
1991	Child's Play 3	Major Ellis	
1990	I'm Dangerous Tonight	Punk #2	TV
1989	Halloween 5: The Revenge of Michael Myers	Spitz	
1989	A Deadly Silence	Boy in Classroom	TV
1988	Casual Sex?	Ronny	
1988	Supercarrier	Unknown	TV

=== Television ===
Year	Title	Role	No. of episodes
2004	Judging Amy	Doctor	1 episode
2004	CSI: Crime Scene Investigation	The Mime	1 episode
1995	The Preston Episodes	Adam Green	2 episodes
1992	Life Goes On	Kingfish	1 episode
1990	Ferris Bueller	Shred	1 episode
1988–1990	Wiseguy	Devlin	2 episodes
1988	Supercarrier	Seaman Apprentice Raymond LaFitte	Unknown

=== Television director ===
Year	Title
2003	Big PlayStation Saturday
2003	Man Made Movie
2000	The Man Made Movie
