= Halloween 5: The Revenge of Michael Myers =

1989 film by Dominique Othenin-Girard

- Theatrical release poster
- Directed by: Dominique Othenin-Girard
- Written by: Michael Jacobs; Dominique Othenin-Girard; Shem Bitterman
- Based on: Characters by: John Carpenter; Debra Hill
- Produced by: Ramsey Thomas
- Starring: Donald Pleasence; Danielle Harris; Ellie Cornell; Beau Starr; Wendy Kaplan; Tamara Glynn
- Cinematography: Robert Draper
- Edited by: Charles Tetoni; Jerry Brady; Michael Westmore II
- Music by: Alan Howarth
- Production companies: Magnum Pictures; Trancas International
- Distributed by: Galaxy International Releasing
- Release date: October 13, 1989
- Running time: 96 minutes
- Country: United States
- Language: English
- Budget: $5.5 million
- Box office: $11.6 million (U.S.)

Halloween 5: The Revenge of Michael Myers (Note: Though the film's promotional materials and tertiary sources bear the title Halloween 5: The Revenge of Michael Myers, the film is credited in the opening titles simply as Halloween 5.) is a 1989 American slasher film co-written and directed by Dominique Othenin-Girard, and starring Donald Pleasence, Danielle Harris, Ellie Cornell, Beau Starr, Wendy Kaplan, and Tamara Glynn. It is the sequel to Halloween 4: The Return of Michael Myers (1988) and the fifth installment in the Halloween series. The story follows serial killer Michael Myers who again returns to the town of Haddonfield to murder his traumatized niece, Jamie Lloyd, with whom he now shares a telepathic connection.

After the success of the previous installment, Halloween 5: The Revenge of Michael Myers was rushed into production by executive producer Moustapha Akkad. The original screenplay, which was still under revision at the time filming began, introduced elements of supernatural horror, including Jamie possessing a telepathic link to Michael Myers, as well as a storied subplot in which Myers, under the influence of a cult centered around the ancient rune of Thorn, is driven to kill his bloodline. While the final cut of the film features a mysterious "Man in Black" character, the "Curse of Thorn" subplot was largely minimized, resulting in audiences and critics expressing some confusion, though it was expanded upon in the following film, Halloween: The Curse of Michael Myers (1995).

Filmed in Salt Lake City in mid-1989, Halloween 5: The Revenge of Michael Myers was released theatrically in North America in October of that year by the independent studio Galaxy Releasing. The film was a box office disappointment, only grossing $11.6 million domestically against a $5.5 million budget, becoming the lowest-grossing film in the franchise, and received generally negative reviews from critics. Common criticism was for the screenplay, acting, and story decisions, though some praised the film for its artistic and gothic visuals, which marked a stylistic shift from the previous film.

== Plot ==
On October 31, 1988, Michael Myers is shot down a mine shaft by Sheriff Ben Meeker and the Illinois state police, (Note: As depicted in Halloween 4: The Return of Michael Myers (1988).) but manages to crawl out before dynamite is dropped down to assure his death. He floats down a river and stumbles upon the shack of an elderly hermit who nurses him back to health. One year later, he awakens and kills the hermit before returning to Haddonfield to resume the hunt for his niece, Jamie Lloyd.

Jamie has been admitted to the Haddonfield Children's Clinic after attacking her foster mother. She has been rendered mute due to psychological trauma and exhibits signs of a telepathic link with her uncle. Dr. Sam Loomis learns of this connection and wants to use it to defeat Michael for good. Meanwhile, Michael kills Jamie's foster sister Rachel and begins stalking her friend, Tina Williams. Jamie senses whenever her loved ones are in danger, triggering episodes of convulsions that disturb those around her.

After unknowingly encountering Michael posing as her boyfriend that he killed, Tina attends a Halloween party at the Tower Farm with her friends, Samantha (Sammy) and Spitz. Sensing that Michael is following them, Jamie (having partially regained her ability to speak) escapes the clinic with her stuttering friend, Billy Hill, to warn Tina of the danger. As Spitz and Samantha have sex in a barn, Michael impales Spitz with a pitchfork and slices Samantha's face with a scythe, and also kills two bumbling deputies Loomis had entrusted to protect Tina. Jamie and Billy find Tina as Michael tries to run them down with a car. Tina ultimately sacrifices herself to save Jamie. With nothing left to lose, Jamie agrees to help Loomis stop Michael once and for all.

Loomis and Meeker create a set up at the abandoned Myers house to lure Michael back to his childhood home. The police receive a call saying Michael has broken into the clinic, prompting Meeker and most of the officers to leave; however, this call is merely a diversion. Michael appears and kills the remaining officers. Loomis tries to reason with him, but Michael slashes him and throws him over the stair banister. He pursues Jamie throughout the house, attacking her as she hides in a laundry chute. Michael chases Jamie up to the attic, where she finds the bodies of Rachel, her dog Max, and Tina's boyfriend. As Michael raises his knife to stab her, Jamie addresses him as "Uncle", causing him to pause. He agrees to remove his mask and let Jamie see his face, shedding a brief tear. However, when Jamie touches his face he goes into a fit of rage and chases her again. Loomis reappears and uses Jamie as live bait to lure Michael into a trap. He shoots Michael with a tranquilizer gun and beats him unconscious with a wooden plank before suffering from a stroke and collapsing on top of him. Meeker and the police return and take Michael into custody.

Michael is locked in a cell at the police station until he can be transferred to a maximum-security facility for the rest of his life, though Jamie asserts that “he'll never die”. As Jamie prepares to return to the clinic, a mysterious man in black who has been quietly observing all day arrives and attacks the police station: Jamie walks into the station to find the bodies of Meeker and his men shot and killed, as well as Michael's cell broken open and empty. Realizing he will chase her again, she sobs in horror.

== Cast ==
- Donald Pleasence as Dr. Sam Loomis
- Danielle Harris as Jamie Lloyd
- Ellie Cornell as Rachel Carruthers
- Beau Starr as Sheriff Ben Meeker
- Wendy Kaplan as Tina Williams
- Tamara Glynn as Samantha Thomas
- Jeffrey Landman as Billy Hill
- Don Shanks as Michael Myers / The Man in Black
- Jonathan Chapin as Mike
- Matthew Walker as Spitz
- Max Robinson as Dr. Max Hart
- Betty Carvalho as Nurse Patsey
- Troy Evans as Deputy Charlie Bloch
- Frank Como as Deputy Nick Ross
- David Ursin as Deputy Tom Farrah

== Production ==
=== Development ===
Development on a fifth Halloween was fast tracked to meet a pre-set release deadline of October 1989. Producer Moustapha Akkad turned to Halloween 4: The Return of Michael Myers writer and director Alan B. McElroy and Dwight H. Little to return for their respective duties on the fifth film, however both declined. Ramsey Thomas assumed producing responsibilities from the fourth film's Paul Freeman, and opted to hire playwright Shem Bitterman as screenwriter. Bitterman's script, entitled Halloween 5: The Killer Inside Me, which was written in the span of three days, featured an evil Jamie Lloyd and resurrected Michael Myers once again. However, Akkad was adamant about making Myers the sole antagonist of the film. Nevertheless, Bitterman penned a second draft by February 1989 and Jeff Burr, director of From a Whisper to a Scream, was being courted to helm the film. Burr's producing partners Darin Scott and William Burr were also in the mix to co-produce alongside Thomas. The directing job was seemingly Burr's until series co-creator Debra Hill met director Dominique Othenin-Girard at the 1989 Sundance Film Festival, and recommended him to Akkad.

After being instated as director, he infamously threw Bitterman's draft into a trashcan in front of Akkad. He brought in Robert Harders, of Home Movies, to write an entirely new draft, which saw a Frankenstein inspired story where Myers is resurrected and no longer evil but is pursued by an angry mob. Harders's pitch was rejected, leading Othenin-Girard to pitch a new concept with co-writer Michael Jacobs. The duo's initial title was Halloween 5... And Things That Go Bump In the Night. After reviewing the screenplay, director Othenin-Girard added Jamie's inability to speak to the draft, along with the supernatural plot device of her telepathic visions connected to Michael.

Another departure from previous films in the series was Othenin-Girard's attempt to persuade the audience to relate to the Michael Myers character, whom he intended to appear "more human [...] even vulnerable, with contradicting feelings inside of him." He illustrated these feelings with a scene where Michael removes his mask and sheds a tear. Girard explains, "Again, to humanize him, to give him a tear. If Evil or in this case our boogeyman knows pain, or love or demonstrate a feeling of regrets; he becomes even more scary to me if he pursues his malefic action. He shows an evil determination beyond his feelings. Dr. Loomis tries to reach his emotional side several times in [Halloween 5]. He thinks he could cure Michael through his feelings."

In the original closing scene, after Jamie finds that Michael has escaped from the police station, she is approached by a black-cloaked figure. At the time of filming, it was unknown who this figure was. It would only be expanded on and explained in the subsequent film, Halloween: The Curse of Michael Myers (1995), and the scene in question was attached to the beginning of the Producer's Cut of that film as a flashback. Though the cuts made to the beginning and ending of the film largely diminish this subplot, the "Man in Black" character still appears momentarily on several occasions in the film, which led to some confusion among audiences upon its original release. Reflecting on his creation of the character, Othenin-Girard commented:

I created the [Man in Black] character without knowing his exact origin. I considered him a soul brother to Michael who came from afar to get to him. I was conscious enough to give freedom of interpretation to the next team of creators as to who he really is. I was attentive not to lock them in too tight of a position, so they could play that card as they wished.

=== Casting ===
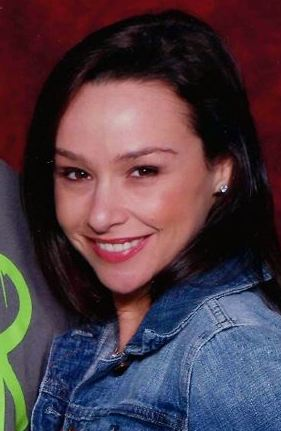
Danielle Harris reprised her role as Jamie Lloyd

Returning from Halloween 4 was Donald Pleasence as Dr. Sam Loomis, along with Danielle Harris, Ellie Cornell, and Beau Starr, as Jamie Lloyd, Rachel Carruthers, and Sheriff Ben Meeker, respectively.

Though enthusiastic of reprising her role as Rachel, Cornell was disappointed to learn that her character would be killed early in the film. In the original screenplay, her character died after Michael shoved a pair of scissors down her throat, but Cornell felt that this would be too gruesome, and requested that the writers change it; as a result, she is instead stabbed in the chest. "They sent me the script," Cornell recalled, "and I knew what was coming. I knew it was Rachel's demise. It's just formula."

Karen Alston, who portrayed Darlene Carruthers in the previous film, reprised her role in the beginning of the film showing the anonymous person in the mask stabbing her as she falls into the bathtub of water. Her voice-over was recorded by Wendy Kaplan. Kaplan won the role of Tina Williams, the loud and wily friend of Rachel's. After Rachel's demise, Tina inherits the role of Jamie's protector.

George P. Wilbur, who had portrayed Michael Myers in the previous film, did not express interest in returning to play the role, though he did serve as a stunt player on the film. Instead, Don Shanks was cast to play the role of Michael Myers. Shanks also portrayed the mysterious Man in Black character in the film. According to Shanks, Othenin-Girard requested that he not study the physicality or previous portrayals of Michael Myers, as he wanted a different visual look for the villain. Wilbur would later reprise the role of Michael Myers again in the next installment, Halloween: The Curse of Michael Myers.

Max Robinson would play Maxwell Hart, the doctor who assists Jamie when she is having one of her nightmares in the beginning of the film. Betty Carvalho appears as his assistant, Nurse Patsey, who has a "motherly" feel to Jamie. Jeffrey Landman portrayed Billy Hill, Jamie's best friend, who has a stutter. Landman worked with a coach who taught him about stuttering to help him prepare for the role.

Newcomers such as Tamara Glynn, Matthew Walker, and Jonathan Chapin appear as Samantha Thomas, Spitz, and Mike, who are friends of Tina and Rachel. Walker would later appear in another slasher film, Child's Play 3 (1991).

=== Filming ===
The film was shot using wide-angle lenses, with the Michael Myers character often being filmed from low angles to create a more imposing look for the villain

Principal photography began on May 1, 1989, in Salt Lake City, Utah, as well as the surrounding communities of Provo and Ogden. Several prior filming locations from Halloween 4: The Return of Michael Myers are featured in the film, including the Carruthers residence, as well as the local general store. At the time the shoot began, the film's screenplay was still unfinished. Unable to find a lookalike Myers house that matched the original Halloween, the filmmakers chose a bigger, more mansion-like house because they needed one that could provide wide rooms, hallways, an attic, a basement, and a laundry chute. The film's opening sequence in which Michael is carried down a river was filmed in rural Snowbird in the Rocky Mountains. Small pine trees were brought in and planted at the film's farm location for the scene in which Michael pursues Jamie in a car, mowing down the trees in the process.

The laundry-chute sequence required an elaborate series of specially constructed sets. Cinematographer Robert Draper later recalled that production designer Brent Swift created approximately 35 to 40 individual chute pieces, including sections with removable walls and horizontally mounted sections that allowed the camera to move alongside Jamie. For some shots, the camera was mounted on a skateboard and moved through the constructed chute. Draper said the filmmakers' intention was to place the audience "inside that chute" with Jamie and create a sense of claustrophobia and panic.

The film was shot entirely by Australian cinematographer Robert Draper, aside from the opening title sequence featuring flash cuts of a knife slashing the interiors of a jack-o'-lantern, which was shot by an independent film title design company. Draper initially declined the offer to shoot the film due to his wife being pregnant at the time, but the production agreed to allow her to accompany him on the shoot; the couple's second son was born in Salt Lake City during production, and as a nod to the film, Draper and his wife gave him the middle name Michael. Draper and director Othenin-Girard chose to shoot the Michael Myers character from low angles to create a heightened imposing look to the villain. Othenin-Girard requested that Draper shoot the film using wide-angle lenses to give the compositions a large scope of view, and aspired to give the film a "European flavor" in terms of visual elements and color.

According to actress Wendy Kaplan, Donald Pleasence exhibited utmost professionalism to the material, and while filming, treated it "like he was doing Shakespeare." Pleasence accidentally broke Don Shanks' nose on the set when they were filming the scene where Dr. Loomis beats The Shape with a block of wood. Shanks was also injured when he was filming the scene where The Shape crashes Mike's Camaro into the tree. Othenin-Girard had forgotten to yell "Cut!" and fire was beginning to emerge from the car (Shanks put this down to Othenin-Girard being sidetracked by seeing stunts take place during his first major directing job). Finally, stunt coordinator Don Hunt told Othenin-Girard to finally yell "cut". Wendy Kaplan was also injured in this scene, as the car almost ran over the top of her. Principal photography completed on June 11, 1989.

=== Special effects ===
The Michael Myers mask featured in Halloween 5 differed from the pasty white mask in the previous film, appearing significantly more weathered and discolored. The mask was designed by Greg Nicotero and molded from his face, though its face was expanded in order to fit actor Don Shanks, whose head was larger than Nicotero's. In addition to designing the mask, Nicotero also oversaw the film's special effects with his KNB EFX Group, alongside Robert Kurtzman, Howard Berger, and Scott Oshita. (Note: As noted during the film's closing credits.)

=== Post-production ===
The film had originally been given an X rating from the Motion Picture Association of America (MPAA) due to its graphic depiction of violence, particularly the sequence in which Jamie, hiding in the laundry chute, is stabbed in the leg by Michael. A significant sequence in the film's finale in which Michael massacres a SWAT team at the Haddonfield hospital was excised in post-production. This sequence was shot largely by second-unit director Don Pike.

==== Alternate opening ====
The film's original screenplay featured a young hermit who takes in the injured Michael at the beginning of the film, whose shack was filled with ancient runes, tablets, and other occult items used to perform necromancy. Though initially filmed as such, with Theron Read portraying the young man (known as "Dr. Death"), the sequence was later re-shot featuring an older actor, and the occult paraphernalia and theme removed. In subsequent years, the original footage featuring Read was thought to be lost. This original sequence had been intended to set the groundwork for a subplot that had Michael Myers under the "Curse of Thorn", controlled by a cult devoted to this ancient rune.

In April 2019, actor Don Shanks reported that film reels had been discovered which may contain the original lost opening scene. In August 2021, it was revealed that Scream Factory had obtained the original opening sequence of the film to be included as a bonus feature on their forthcoming UHD and Blu-ray, which was released October 5, 2021.

== Music ==
Alan Howarth returned to compose the film. Similar to previous movies in the Halloween franchise, the soundtrack contains the score and songs heard throughout the film by bands and solo artists such as White Sister and Rhythm Tribe. There are also some unknown bands and solo artists on the soundtrack such as Becca, DV8, Eileen Clark, Diggy, and Mark Chosak. The soundtrack was released to CD, vinyl, and cassette on September 11, 1989.

== Release ==
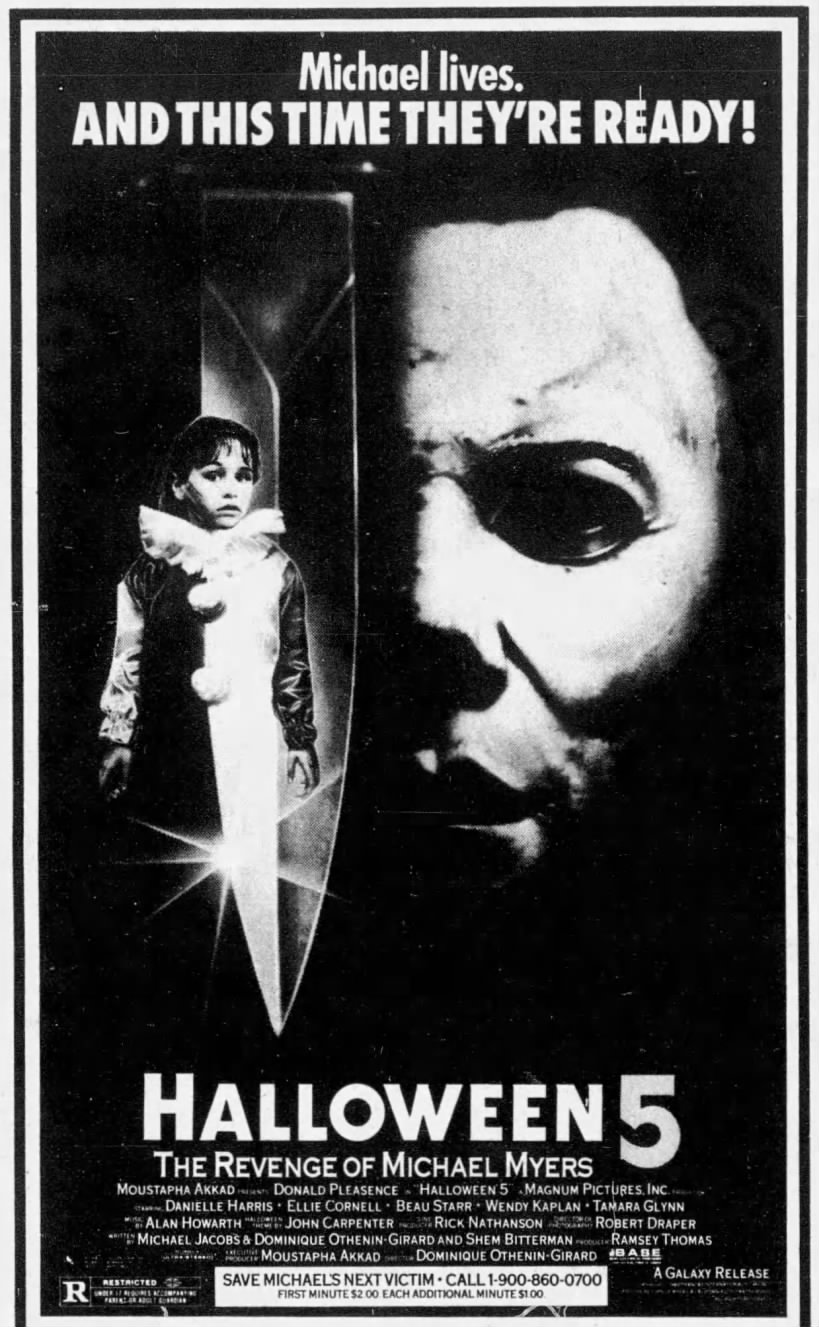
Newspaper advertisement featuring a "Save Michael's next victim" 1-900 number

Halloween 5 opened theatrically in North America on October 13, 1989, distributed by the independent Galaxy Releasing. To market the film, newspaper advertisements publicized a 1-900 hotline phone number in which callers could "save Michael's next victim."

=== Box office ===
The film earned $5.1 million in its opening weekend, ranking number two at the United States box office after Look Who's Talking. It continued to screen throughout November 1989, with a reported earning of $449,686 during the weekend of November 3, 1989, showing on 537 screens. The film's theatrical run lasted three months, concluding in December 1989, with an ultimate gross of $11.6 million domestically; the film stands as the least-attended in its franchise with approximately 2,917,858 tickets sold during its initial theatrical run, and was regarded as a box-office disappointment.

=== Home media ===
Halloween 5: The Revenge of Michael Myers was released on VHS and LaserDisc by CBS/Fox Video on March 1, 1990. In September 2000, Anchor Bay Entertainment released the film on VHS and DVD, including a limited edition DVD housed in a tin box with collectible lobby cards. Anchor Bay reissued the DVD with additional bonus materials in 2006 before releasing it on Blu-ray in 2012.

In September 2014, the film was included in a Blu-ray box set of the entire Halloween film series, released by Scream Factory, in association with Anchor Bay, in both a standard and deluxe limited edition. On October 5, 2021, Shout! Factory sub-label Scream Factory released the film in a UHD and Blu-ray combination package, featuring a new 4K scan of the original film elements, as well as newly-discovered cut footage included as a bonus feature.

== Reception ==
On the review aggregator website Rotten Tomatoes, 10% of 29 critics' reviews are positive, with an average rating of 3.7/10. The website's consensus reads: "Halloween 5: The Revenge Of Michael Myers finds the series embracing crude slasher conventions with pedestrian scares, disposable characters, and aimless plotting." Metacritic, which uses a weighted average, assigned the film a score of 28 out of 100, based on 10 critics, indicating "generally unfavorable" reviews.

Stephen Holden of The New York Times wrote that the film was "rather like taking another swing through the same all-too-familiar funhouse", but thought it was "a bit more refined in its details than the conventional horror movie". Variety called the film "pretty stupid and boring fare" and noted that the series had become "practically indistinguishable from the Friday the 13th pics". Richard Harrington of The Washington Post criticized the film as being "a prime example of the principle of diminishing reruns" and Donald Pleasence for "a flat two-note performance", though he thought Danielle Harris was "actually pretty good" in her role. Michael Wilmington, writing for the Los Angeles Times, felt the film was derivative and featured an "infinitely repeated plot" akin to that of the previous installments. The San Francisco Examiner's Joe Baltake found the film uninspired and "boring."

Some critics derided the film for its obscure appearances of the "Man in Black" character, which was not elucidated in the final cut of the film. Gary Thompson of the Philadelphia Daily News noted this in his review, commenting that "his identity is never revealed, and his actions are never explained. What does this mean? It means the series has turned into a soap opera, attempting to keep the audience interested with cheap dramatic stunts borrowed from daytime television." Kimberly Link of the Southtown Star also remarked that the film's final section is "simply devoted to setting up Halloween 6... A mysterious strange appears on the scene... The viewer sees only his boots. We have to wait until next year to see who he is. Yippee."

The Hartford Courant's Malcolm L. Johnson, however, gave the film a favorable review, deeming it the best sequel in the series and praising Othenin-Girard's "arty touch to the stalkings and killings," as well as the performance by Harris, who "quivers, shakes and screams with an intensity that makes one fear for her sanity." John Wooley of Tulsa World was also impressed by the film's visual elements, noting that its "scene composition features a lot of alternating light and dark spots, as though the scene is being viewed through the bars of a cell, and it's impressive," but simultaneously felt that the film features "the most unsatisfying ending of any horror film in recent memory." Ted Mahar of The Oregonian praised the film for Harris's lead performance, noting it as "phenomenal... Young Harris stumbles, shrieks, cries, pants, gasps, bleeds and suffers to a satirical extent and still delivers a splendid performance." Greg Jaklewicz of the Abilene Reporter-News wrote: "With Halloween just around the dark corner, is it any surprise that we take a sentimental journey to Haddonfield, Illinois, to see how many residents are not going to make it to Christmas this year?"

Later assessments have remained mixed to negative, although the film's visual style and individual suspense sequences have received some retrospective praise. In a 2013 franchise retrospective, The A.V. Club criticized the film overall but noted the conspicuously stylized use of canted angles and wide lenses. Fangoria later described the film as uneven but praised several of Othenin-Girard's suspense sequences, particularly the laundry-chute scene.

== In other media ==
In October 2026, IllFonic announced downloadable content for Halloween: The Game based on Halloween 5. The content, scheduled for release on October 27, includes a Michael Myers skin based on his appearance in the film and a free "Tower Farm" multiplayer map inspired by the film's rural settings.

== See also ==
- List of films set around Halloween

== Sources ==
- Clark, Sean; Kasch, Andrew; Wallick, Buz (2013). Dead Man's Party: The Making of Halloween 5 (Documentary short). Scream Factory; Anchor Bay Entertainment. OCLC 904440200.
- Felsher, Michael, ed. (2021). "Of Darkness And Shadows": The Cinematography of Halloween 5 (Blu-ray documentary short). Scream Factory. OCLC 1357552321.
- Harper, Jim (2004). Legacy of Blood: A Comprehensive Guide to Slasher Movies. Manchester, England: Critical Vision. ISBN 978-1-900-48639-2.
- McNeill, Dustin; Mullins, Travis (2020). Taking Shape II: The Lost Halloween Sequels. Greensboro, North Carolina: Harker Press. ISBN 978-0-578-74526-8.
- Muir, John Kenneth (2010). Horror Films of the 1980s. Jefferson, North Carolina: McFarland & Company. ISBN 978-0-786-45501-0.
- Petridis, Sotiris (2019). Anatomy of the Slasher Film: A Theoretical Analysis. Jefferson, North Carolina: McFarland & Company. ISBN 978-1-476-67431-5.
- Spiegel, Josh (2023). Timelines of Terror: The Fractured Continuities of Horror Film Sequels. Jefferson, North Carolina: McFarland & Company. ISBN 978-1-476-64923-8.
- Stanley, John (2000). Creature Features: The Science Fiction, Fantasy, and Horror Movie Guide. New York City, New York: Berkley Boulevard Books. ISBN 978-0-425-17517-0.
