= Le Médecin malgré lui =

Comedy play by Molière

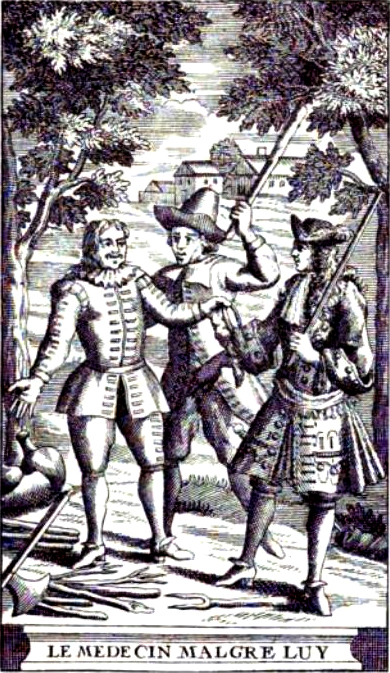
Front page of The Doctor in Spite of Himself—engraving from the 1719 edition

Le Médecin malgré lui (French pronunciation: [lə medsɛ̃ malɡʁe lɥi]; "The doctor/physician in spite of himself") is a farce by Molière first presented in 1666 (published as a manuscript in early 1667) at le théâtre du Palais-Royal by la Troupe du Roi. The play is one of several plays by Molière to center on Sganarelle, a character that Molière himself portrayed, and is a comedic satire of 17th century French medicine. The music composed by Marc-Antoine Charpentier is lost.

The play initially focuses on Sganarelle, an impoverished woodcutter (logger, timber cutter) who is both alcoholic and gluttonous. He spends his meager income on food and drink for himself. One day, he beats his wife during an argument between them. In revenge, the wife convinces the servants of a wealthy man that Sganarelle is an eccentric physician who needs beatings to admit his identity and work.

The initially unwilling Sganarelle is forced to pretend to be an educated physician. He is tasked with curing Lucinde, the wealthy man's daughter who is supposedly suffering from muteness. The patient is actually faking her illness to avoid an arranged marriage.

== Characters ==
- Sganarelle, an alcoholic, gluttonous woodcutter (The title character)
- Martine, Sganarelle's wife
- Lucinde, Sganarelle's patient; daughter of Geronte
- Léandre, Lucinde's lover
- Geronte, a wealthy bourgeois; father of Lucinde
- Valère, Geronte's educated servant
- Lucas, Geronte's non-educated servant
- Jacqueline, Lucas's wife and Geronte's non-educated feeder
- Monsieur Robert, Sganarelle's neighbor
- Thibaut, a country person
- Perrin, a country person; son of Thibaut

== Synopsis ==
Sganarelle, a poor woodcutter, makes life a living hell for his wife and family by spending what little he earns on food and drink for himself. As the play opens, he is seen arguing with and eventually beating his wife, Martine, who then decides to take revenge. As she is plotting, she hears two passing servants of a rich man mention their frustration at being unable to find a doctor who can cure their master's daughter's mysterious illness. She convinces the two that her husband is an eccentric but brilliant doctor, whom they must beat into admitting his identity. The servants find Sganarelle cutting wood and drinking in the woods nearby and beat him until he finally admits to being a doctor.

The servants take him to meet their master, Geronte, and his daughter Lucinde who has become mysteriously mute. Sganarelle spends his first session with her frantically trying to pass as a real doctor, mainly out of fear of being beaten again. When he sees how much Geronte is willing to pay him, however, he decides to give up woodcutting and remain a "doctor" for the rest of his life.

Eventually Sganarelle discovers that his patient is in fact only pretending to be ill, because she is betrothed to a rich man whom she does not love. Farcical comedy ensues, climaxing with Sganarelle being discovered and almost executed. The play ends with a classical moment of deus ex machina; with Lucinde's love, Geronte's wishes, and Sganarelle's fate being neatly and happily resolved.

== Sganarelle's monologue ==
Below is Charles Heron Wall’s 1898 translation of Sganarelle's famous speech:

No, I tell you; they made a doctor of me in spite of myself. I had never dreamt of being so learned as that, and all my studies came to an end in the lowest form. I can't imagine what put that whim into their heads; but when I saw that they were resolved to force me to be a doctor, I made up my mind to be one at the expense of those I might have to do with. Yet you would hardly believe how the error has spread abroad, and how everyone is obstinately determined to see a great doctor in me. They come to fetch me from right and left; and if things go on in that fashion, I think I had better stick to physic all my life. I find it the best of trades; for, whether we are right or wrong, we are paid equally well. We are never responsible for the bad work, and we cut away as we please in the stuff we work on. A shoe maker in making shoes can't spoil a scrap of leather without having to pay for it, but we can spoil a man without paying one farthing for the damage done. The blunders are not ours, and the fault is always that of the dead man. In short, the best part of this profession is, that there exists among the dead an honesty, a discretion that nothing can surpass; and never as yet has one been known to complain of the doctor who had killed him.

== Adaptations ==
Molière's play was adapted by Henry Fielding as The Mock Doctor, and Charles Gounod wrote an opera using a libretto by Jules Barbier and Michel Carré closely based on the play, also entitled Le médecin malgré lui and using Molière words in places.

An hour-long radio adaptation of the play by Ernest Kinoy was performed on the NBC Theatre on 25 June 1950. Another hour-long radio adaptation was broadcast on the Lux Summer Theatre on 13 July 1953.

Films

- Le Médecin malgré lui, directed by Émile Chautard, 1910
- Medico per forza, directed by Carlo Campogalliani, with Ettore Petrolini, 1931
- The Doctor in Spite of Himself, Hong Kong film starring Cheung Tat-ming, 1999
- Le Médecin malgré lui (Toubib al affia), Moroccan film by Henry Jacques

Poetry

- Le Médecin malgré lui, by William Carlos Williams

== Related articles ==
- Iceberg (short story)
