= Always Remember I Love You =

- Genre: Drama
- Written by: Vivienne Radkoff
- Directed by: Michael Miller
- Starring: Patty Duke; Stephen Dorff; Joan Van Ark; Richard Masur; David Birney
- Music by: David Shire
- Country of origin: United States
- Original language: English

Production
- Executive producer: Marcy Gross
- Producers: Bruce Golin; Diane Walsh; Ann Weston
- Production locations: Ashtabula, Ohio; Vancouver
- Cinematography: Laszlo George
- Editor: Janet Bartels
- Running time: 95 minutes
- Production companies: Gross-Weston Productions; Stephen J. Cannell Productions

Original release
- Network: CBS
- Release: December 23, 1990

Always Remember I Love You is a 1990 television film starring Patty Duke and Stephen Dorff, produced by Gross-Weston Productions in association with Stephen J. Cannell Productions. It tells the story of a teenage boy who, after finding out he was adopted, runs away from home to search for his biological family.

== Plot ==
Shortly after Robert Mendham (played by Stephen Dorff) turns 16, he finds out from his parents (David Birney and Joan Van Ark) that he was not only adopted, but stolen from his childhood home (a fact unknown by his parents until that time). He then runs away from home to search for his biological parents and ends up in a small town in Ohio where, using the public library files, he tracks down his mother Ruth Monroe (Patty Duke) and father Earl (Richard Masur). He then manages to befriend his biological brother and get taken in as a runaway by them, while trying to find out where he belongs, all the while keeping his true identity from them.

== Cast ==
- Patty Duke as Ruth Monroe
- Stephen Dorff as Robert Mendham
- Joan Van Ark as Martha "Marty" Mendham
- Richard Masur as Earl Monroe
- David Birney as Philip Mendham
- Sam Wanamaker as Grandfather Mendham
- Jarred Blancard as John Monroe
- Linda Darlow as Fran
- Kimberley Warnat as Sally Monroe

== Home video releases ==
The movie was released on VHS in the UK in 1991 by Odyssey Pictures.
