= Moment of Truth: A Mother's Deception =

- Written by: Dan Levine
- Directed by: Chuck Bowman
- Starring: Joan Van Ark; Stephen Macht; Brooke Langton
- Music by: Laura Karpman
- Country of origin: United States
- Original language: English

Production
- Executive producers: Lawrence Horowitz; Michael O'Hara
- Producer: Michelle MacLaren
- Cinematography: David Geddes
- Editor: Barbara Pokras
- Running time: 91 minutes
- Production companies: O'Hara-Horowitz Productions; New World Entertainment

Original release
- Network: NBC
- Release: October 17, 1994

Moment of Truth: A Mother's Deception (also called Moment of Truth: Cult Rescue) is a 1994 American made-for-television drama film directed by Chuck Bowman. Based on a true story, the film is an original Moment of Truth film that stars Joan Van Ark, Stephen Macht and Brooke Langton.

== Plot ==
When Nora McGill (Van Ark) is turned down for a loan officer position at the bank she works by her boss Travis (McNulty), she begins suffering from a mild depression. Her husband Harry (Macht) and teenage daughter Kim (Langton) start to become estranged from Nora as she grows more bothered by chronic pains. A visit from her doctor confuses her, as Dr. Jaffe (Walker) is not able to diagnose any medical problems. She is then contacted by psychotherapist Dr. Brian Allen, who invites her to visit one of his sessions. Little does Nora know, Brian is a fanatical member of a religious cult, and is a fraud who wants to indoctrinate her.

As Nora attends more of Brian's sessions, her pain starts to disappear. She is able to find her joy in life again, and loosens up by buying Kim a car for her birthday. She quickly becomes infatuated with her therapist and even has daydreams about him. Matters change for the worse when Brian hypnotizes Nora and convinces her that Harry has been abusing her. Nora immediately packs her bags and leaves her family behind, only to join the cult completely. Kim desperately tries to convince her mother not to go, and insists that Harry has never raised his hand against her, but Nora does not believe her and leaves.

Kim, who has recently enrolled into college, contacts her professor Ben Jacoby (Kurlander) for help. Ben has worked as a cult buster in the past, but gave up this profession because he was repeatedly sued for kidnapping. Kim and Harry convince Ben that Nora is in a bad state, and he returns for the job one more time. In a scheme, Kim takes out Nora for a ride in her new car, only to be 'arrested' by a 'police officer'. Nora is then taken to a cabin in the mountains, where she is forced to stay until she realizes that she is being brainwashed. Nora refuses to believe any of her family and Ben's claims, and does not want to be in the same room with her 'abuser'.

After a while, Kim, Harry and Ben have still not been able to get through Nora. Nora decides to sneak out of the cabin and flees the scene. Harry follows her and rescues her as she is about to get hit by a car. Soon after, Brian and his followers have located Nora and break into the cabin to take her with them. In the end, Harry and Kim finally make Nora realize that she was brainwashed and that Brian placed a false memory of abuse into her mind when she was under hypnosis. She rejects Brian and is happily reunited with her family.

== Cast ==
- Joan Van Ark as Nora McGill
- Stephen Macht as Harry McGill
- Tom Kurlander as Ben Jacoby
- Brooke Langton as Kim McGill
- Daniel Hugh Kelly as Dr. Brian Allen
- Michele Goodger as Evelyn
- Lossen Chambers as Candace
- Kevin McNulty as Mr. Travis
- Matthew Walker as Dr. Jaffe
