= Joan Van Ark =

American actress (born 1943)

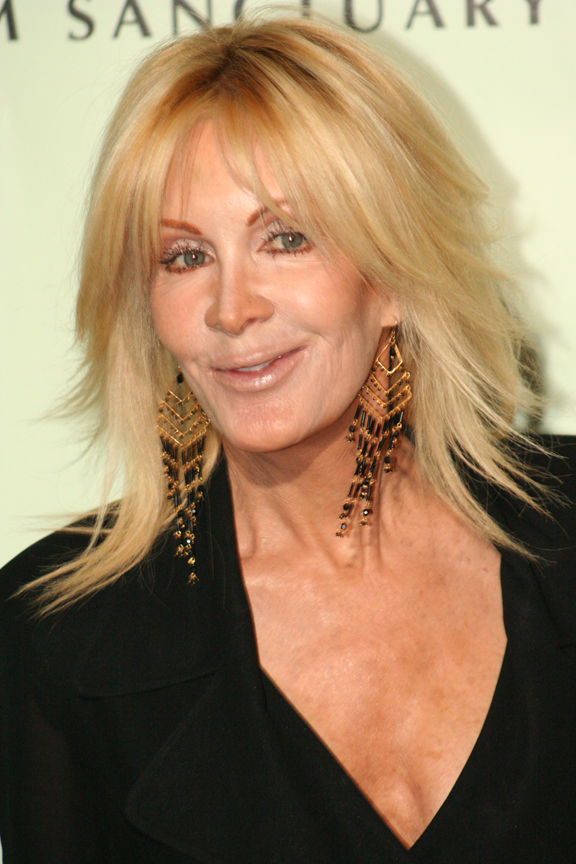
- Joan Van Ark in 2007
- Born: Joan Martha Van Ark; June 16, 1943 (age 83); New York City, U.S.
- Education: Yale University
- Occupation: Actress
- Years active: 1963–present
- Spouse: John Marshall (m. 1966)
- Children: Vanessa Marshall

Joan Martha Van Ark (born June 16, 1943) is an American actress. She is best known for her role as Valene Ewing on the primetime soap opera Knots Landing. A life member of The Actors Studio, she made her Broadway debut in 1966 in Barefoot in the Park. In 1971, she received a Theatre World Award and was nominated for the Tony Award for Best Featured Actress in a Play for the revival of The School for Wives.

In 1978, Van Ark landed her most famous role of Valene Ewing. The character first appeared on the CBS series Dallas, then was a leading character for 13 seasons on its spin-off Knots Landing (1979–92). For her performance on Knots Landing, she won the Soap Opera Digest Award for Best Actress in 1986 and 1989. She left the show in 1992, although she returned for the series' final two episodes in 1993 as well as the 1997 miniseries Knots Landing: Back to the Cul-de-Sac. In 1985, she received a Daytime Emmy Award nomination as host of the Tournament of Roses Parade on CBS. From 2004 to 2005, she starred in the soap opera The Young and the Restless. She reprised her role of Valene in an episode of the new Dallas series in 2013.

== Early life and education ==
Joan Martha Van Ark was born on June 16, 1943, in New York City to Dorothy Jean Van Ark (née Hemenway) (1917–1983) and Carroll Clement Van Ark (1897–1972). Van Ark's father was an advertiser and public relations consultant, photographer and contributor to periodicals such as Collier's and The New Yorker. Carroll Van Ark's paternal grandfather Gradus was an immigrant from The Netherlands who settled in Holland, Michigan. Both of Van Ark's parents were also writers. After 1952, Van Ark grew up in Boulder, Colorado, with three siblings: Carol, Mark and Dexter.

"My dad was in PR in Denver. When I was 16, he arranged for her (Julie Harris) to speak with me. She ended up calling the dean of the Yale School of Drama, who agreed to meet with me. I became the second woman after Julie to be admitted when it was all men." - Joan Van Ark

At age 15 as a student reporter, Van Ark met and interviewed actress Julie Harris, who recommended that Van Ark apply to the Yale School of Drama, which Harris had attended in her early twenties. Van Ark followed in Harris' footsteps and went to Yale Drama on a scholarship. In 1964, Van Ark was one of the few acceptees to attend the Yale graduate program without first having earned an undergraduate degree. Van Ark was also reportedly the only female student on campus at the time. She attended for only one year. Years later, Harris appeared on Knots Landing as Lilimae Clements, the mother of Valene Ewing, Van Ark's character.

After Harris died in 2013, Van Ark announced at a Broadway memorial service the creation of the Julie Harris Scholarship, which provides annual support to an actor studying at the Yale Drama School. Alec Baldwin, who played Harris' son and Van Ark's brother on Knots Landing, made the first contribution. In 2021, Yale Drama became tuition-free and was rebranded the David Geffen School of Drama at Yale University.

== Career ==
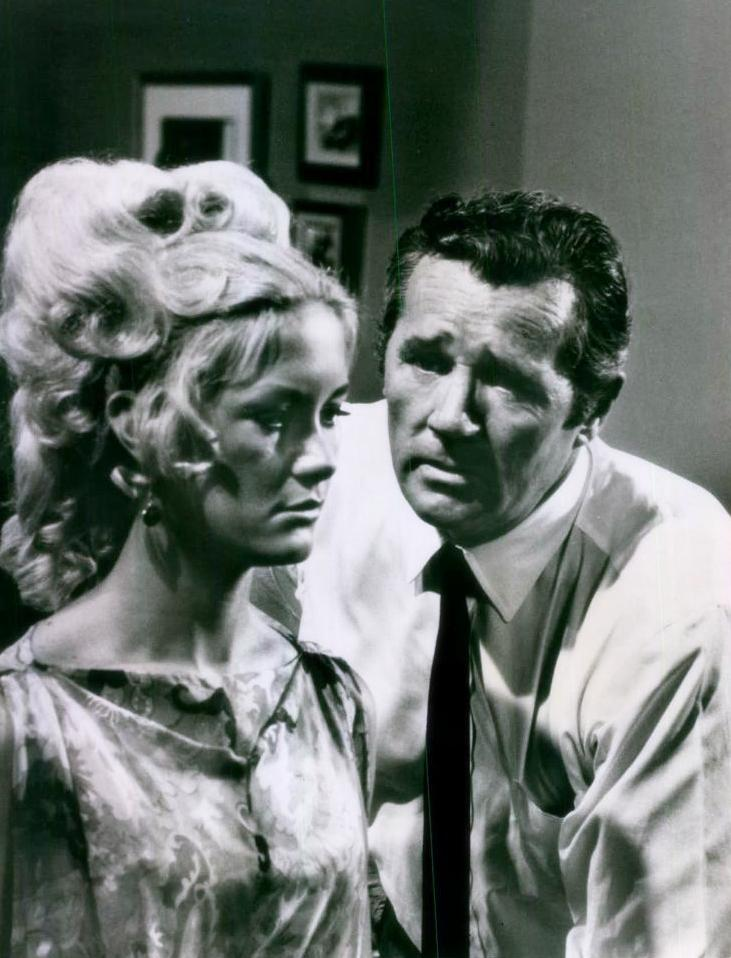
Van Ark and Howard Duff in Felony Squad (1968)

Van Ark began her professional career at the Guthrie Theater in Molière's The Miser and appeared opposite Hume Cronyn and Zoe Caldwell. That was followed by Death of a Salesman at the Guthrie with both Cronyn and Jessica Tandy. After a season at the Arena Stage in Washington, D.C., she originated the role of Corie in the national touring company of Barefoot in the Park, directed by Mike Nichols. In 1966, she recreated the role at the Piccadilly Circus in the critically acclaimed London Company when she replaced Marlo Thomas, who had pulled out due to a ligament injury; and later that same year, Van Ark made her Broadway debut as Corie at the Biltmore Theater and became one of the successors of Elizabeth Ashley, who three years earlier had appeared in the original Broadway production.

Van Ark and her new husband moved to Los Angeles, where she started garnering television credits. In 1971, she revisited Broadway, where she earned a Theatre World Award and received a Tony nomination (Best Featured Actress in a Play) for her performance as Agnès in Molière's The School for Wives, directed by Stephen Porter.

Van Ark starred opposite Ray Milland and Sam Elliott in the horror film Frogs, which was theatrically released on March 10, 1972.

After receiving a contract with Universal Studios, Van Ark co-starred with Bette Davis in The Judge and Jake Wyler, a 1972 two-hour telefilm and series pilot that failed to be picked up by NBC.Van Ark played the role of Erika in M*A*S*H in 1973 in the episode entitled "Radar's Report,” in which she rejects the prospect of marriage to Hawkeye (Alan Alda). Van Ark was also a regular cast member of the short-lived television sitcoms Temperatures Rising (1972–73) and We've Got Each Other (1977–78).

In 1974, Van Ark, tapped as a late replacement for Mary Ure, returned to Broadway as Silia Gala in a revival of Pirandello's The Rules of the Game, which was performed by the New Phoenix Repertory Co. at the Helen Hayes Theater and also featured Glenn Close, who, in addition to playing a bit part as a neighbor, served as Van Ark's understudy in the lead role of Silia. Game reunited Van Ark with School for Wives director Stephen Porter as well as Wives co-star David Dukes. In 1975, a production of Game was also broadcast on Great Performances as one of its Theatre in America selections.

Van Ark co-starred opposite Richard Boone in the science fiction outing The Last Dinosaur, which was filmed at Tsuburaya Studios in Tokyo and on location in the Japanese Alps. The picture was intended to be released theatrically but failed to find a distributor and instead aired as a TV movie in February 1977.

In addition, Van Ark performed the voice of Spider-Woman in the short-lived 1979 animated series of the same name.

After working for several years in a variety of guest roles on television, in 1978, she gained her best-known role as Valene Ewing (originally as a one-time appearance) on Dallas. Van Ark kept a tight schedule and was flying a lot the week of her Dallas debut, as Dallas was being filmed in Texas and she was simultaneously shooting an episode of The Love Boat in L.A. and doing voiceover work for Estée Lauder in New York.

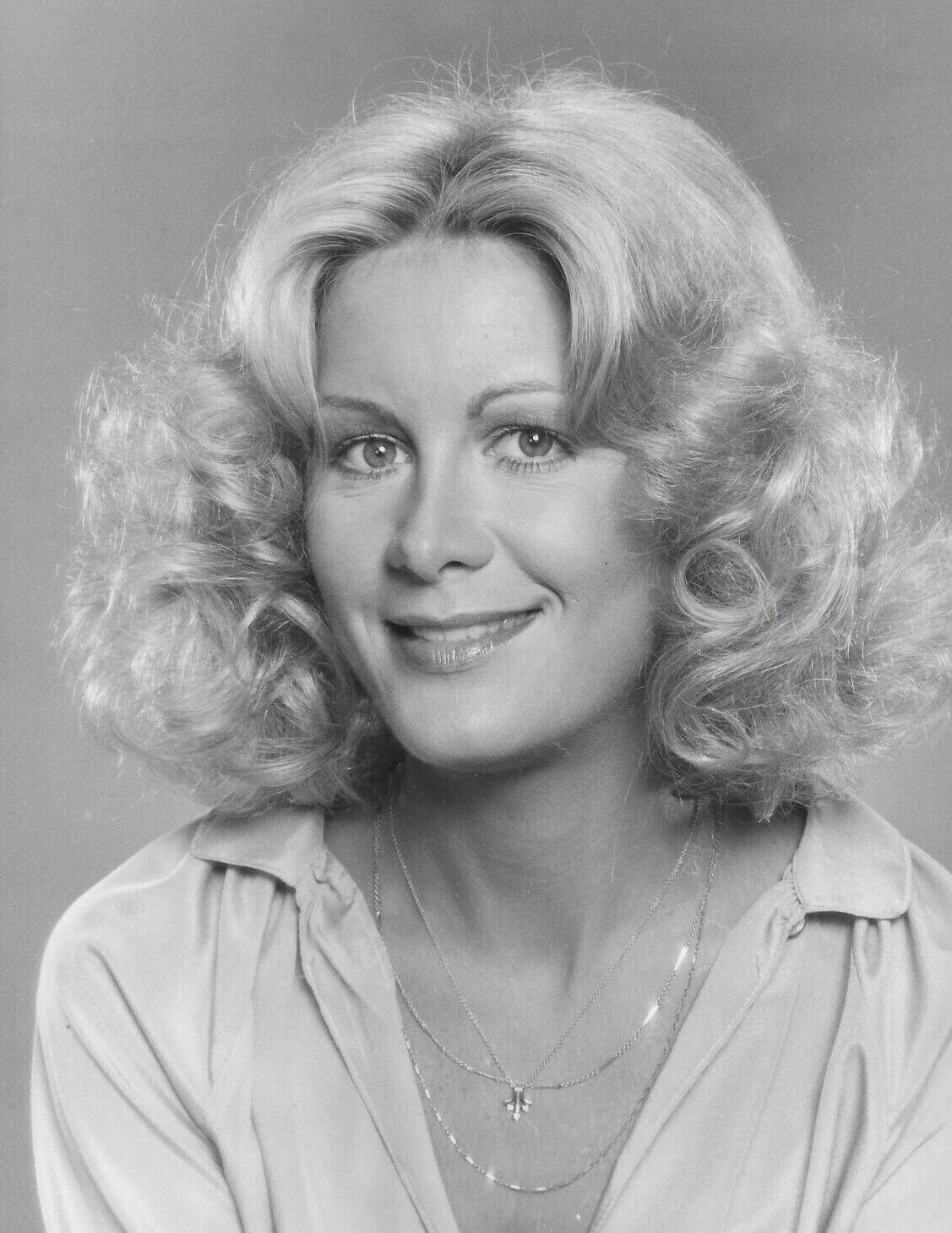
Van Ark in a 1977

However, writers later worked the character into a couple of additional episodes; and in 1979, Van Ark then carried the Valene character over into the long-running spin-off, Knots Landing, in which she co-starred for thirteen of the show's fourteen seasons. She left in 1992, although she did return for its final two episodes in May 1993. Her character was married three times to husband Gary Ewing, played in the series by Ted Shackelford; and during the show's run, also had two other marriages: to Ben Gibson (Doug Sheehan) and Danny Waleska (Sam Behrens).

During her thirteen years on Knots Landing, Van Ark earned two Soap Opera Digest Awards for Best Actress (1986, 1989) and was nominated an additional six times. Over the course of the program, Van Ark probably received her greatest recognition as an actress during the sixth year, which featured an intricate storyline involving the theft of Valene's twin babies. Their disappearance (and alleged stillborn deaths) provoked Valene to embark on a surreal spiritual journey and pilgrimage in which she left the cul-de-sac in California and morphed into the persona of a character from a novel she had written.

"The face-washing scene was an example of when I felt [a scene] couldn't have gone better. It was everything we were all after. It became a monologue where I felt Valene should change and the audience should go with her on that journey. Of all the things I've ever done, I feel that that scene where Val washed her face was the deepest one. It was so rich. There was a combination of the cameraman, the writers, the producers, the director — they all allowed me that monologue in the mirror. We saw Valene become Verna right in front of our eyes." - Joan Van Ark

This dark, harrowing story earned Knots Landing its only placement ever on Nielsen's annual Top 10 programs list. In the 1984–1985 season finale, "The Long and Winding Road," Val finds out that her babies are still alive, and this episode's original broadcast on May 23, 1985, also marked the only time Knots Landing ever reached the #1 spot in the weekly Nielsen ratings. In its edition dated June 29, 1985, TV Guide assessed of her performance: "Knots Landing has the grimmest plots but the strongest cast, headed by the incomparable Joan Van Ark as Valene." Later on, she directed two of the series' episodes, one in the last season after she was no longer a regular performer on the serial.

In 1985, she also co-hosted with Bob Barker CBS' Tournament of Roses Parade, which received a Daytime Emmy nomination for Outstanding Special Class Program.

Mirroring their characters' onscreen friendship, Van Ark and KL co-star Michele Lee became good friends while working together on the series. In May 1997, Van Ark reprised her role of Valene Ewing in the CBS mini-series Knots Landing: Back to the Cul-de-Sac; while in December 2005, she appeared in the non-fiction reunion Knots Landing Reunion: Together Again, in which she reminisced with the other cast members about the long-running CBS television show.

Shortly before leaving Knots Landing, she starred opposite Christopher Meloni in an ill-fated pilot called Spin Doctors, a sitcom for NBC that was not picked up.

An ABC Afterschool Special called Boys Will Be Boys: The Ali Cooper Story (1994), which she appeared in and directed, was nominated for a Humanitas. In 1997, Van Ark also directed a documentary short on homelessness and domestic violence for the Directors Guild of America, and the piece was nominated for an Emmy Award.

She originated the role of Gloria Fisher Abbott on CBS television's The Young and the Restless from 2004 to 2005, then decided to leave the role and was replaced by Judith Chapman.

Van Ark also appeared Off-Broadway opposite John Rubinstein in Love Letters, as well as in Edward Albee's Pulitzer Prize winning Three Tall Women at the Promenade Theatre and The Exonerated at the Bleecker Street Theatre. In 2000, she performed in Camino Real in Washington, D.C.

Her Los Angeles theater credits include: Cyrano de Bergerac as Roxanne (opposite Richard Chamberlain in the title role) as well as Ring Around the Moon, Chemin de Fer, Heartbreak House and As You Like It, for which she won a Los Angeles Drama Critics Award. Opposite David Birney, she appeared as Lady Macbeth in the Grove Shakespeare Festival's production of Macbeth, produced by Charles Johanson.

Van Ark has also starred in three Williamstown Theatre Festival productions: The Night of the Iguana (1987), the 40th anniversary presentation of Stephen Sondheim's A Little Night Music (1994) and The Legend of Oedipus (1988), which is a five-hour, two-part adaptation by Kenneth Cavander of the classic Greek tragedies and was directed by WTF co-founder Nikos Psacharopoulos, who was also Van Ark's acting professor when she was attending the Yale School of Drama.

Later stage work includes: her origination of the role of Mrs. Fenway in Escape, one of the newly discovered Tennessee Williams' shorts featured as part of the Five by Tenn collection at the Kennedy Center in 2004; the 2005 La Jolla Playhouse production of Private Fittings, directed by Des McAnuff, and a presentation of A Lovely Sunday for Creve Coeur in 2006 at the Hartford Stage.

Her TV movies include: With Harmful Intent opposite former Yale classmate Daniel J. Travanti and Rick Springfield as her husband Paul; My First Love, in which she plays the younger woman in a romantic triangle with Bea Arthur and Richard Kiley; Always Remember I Love You opposite Patty Duke; Moment of Truth: A Mother's Deception; and based on the novel by Stuart M. Kaminsky, When the Dark Man Calls, in which she portrays a radio psychologist opposite Chris Sarandon as her brother Lloyd and James Read as Detective Lieberman. Her steamy love scene with Read re-established Van Ark as a 1990s sex symbol and role model for women over 50.

Van Ark has also performed in a variety of guest roles, including on episodes of Bonanza, Hawaii Five-O, Night Gallery, M*A*S*H, The Six Million Dollar Man, Petrocelli, Quincy, Kojak, Barnaby Jones and Rhoda (in which she played the ex-wife of Rhoda's husband). She appeared in three separate episodes of Medical Center, Cannon and The Rockford Files (opposite James Garner) and four separate episodes of The Love Boat. In 1978, she also appeared in an episode of Wonder Woman with Ted Shackelford, who would later become her onscreen husband Gary Ewing on both Dallas and Knots Landing. Post-KL guest spots include appearances on The Fresh Prince of Bel-Air, Cybill and The Nanny.

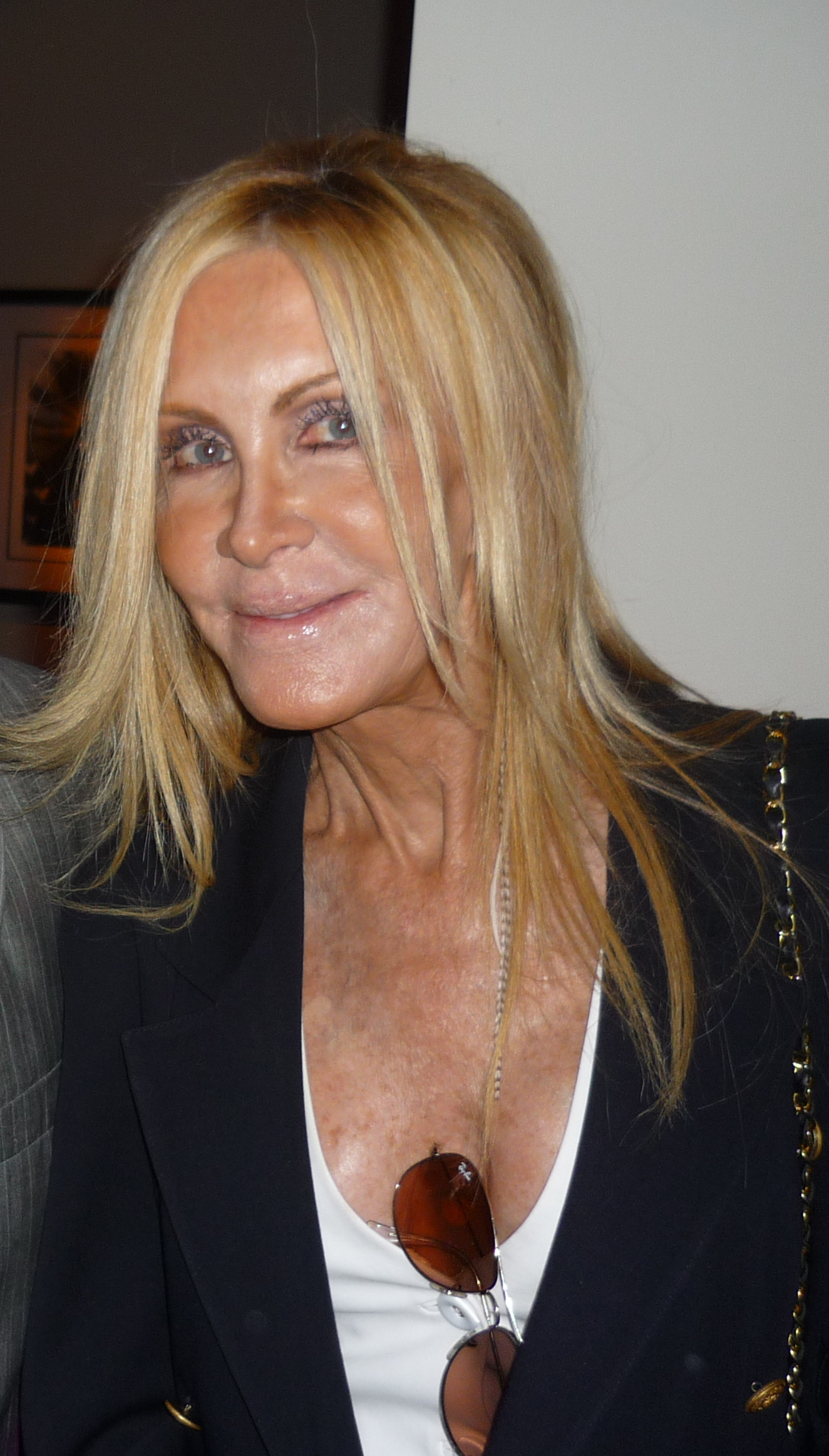
Van Ark in 2008

In April 2001, Van Ark was featured in an episode of the Howard Stern-produced show Son of the Beach as Ima Cummings, the mother of show regular BJ Cummings (played by Jaime Bergman). In 2008, she was reunited with her Knots Landing co-star Donna Mills in an episode of the FX drama series Nip/Tuck. The same year, she also played a network executive in the film Channels.

In April 2009, Van Ark appeared at the TV Land awards, where Knots Landing was being honored on its 30-year anniversary. Other Knots Landing actors who were present included Michele Lee, Donna Mills, Kevin Dobson, Ted Shackelford, Lisa Hartman Black, Constance McCashin, Don Murray and Michelle Phillips, along with Dallas/Knots Landing creator David Jacobs.

In 2011, she performed voice work in an episode of the animated comedy series Archer. In 2013, she guest-starred in an episode of the new Dallas series, in which she reprised the role of Valene Ewing. The same year, she also appeared as a guest judge on the Logo series RuPaul's Drag Race in the episode entitled "Scent of a Drag Queen."

In 2025, Van Ark reunited with KL co-stars Michele Lee and Donna Mills for the episodic podcast We're Knot Done Yet, available on streaming platforms such as Podbean, YouTube and Spotify.

== Personal life ==
On February 1, 1966, Van Ark married news reporter and later award-winning KNBC-TV correspondent John Marshall. Van Ark and Marshall were high school sweethearts in Boulder, Colorado, and wed in Trier, Germany, where Marshall was stationed at the time in the Armed Forces Television Service. For their honeymoon, they took a European tour of places made famous by her namesake, Joan of Arc.

The couple's only child is voice actress, model, and singer Vanessa Marshall. In 1997, mother and daughter appeared together in the play Star Dust at the Tiffany Theater.

Van Ark is a long-distance runner who has participated in 14 marathons and made the cover of Runner's World.

=== Health issues ===
Van Ark has been absent from several 2026 We're Knot Done Yet podcast installments due to reported health issues.

== Filmography ==
Year	Title	Role	Notes
1967	Run for Your Life	Donna Hayward	2 episodes
1968	The Felony Squad	Lynne Thackeray	Episode: "A Fashion for Dying"
1968	Peyton Place	Paula Dixon	2 episodes
1968	The Mod Squad	April Showers	Episode: "Twinkle, Twinkle, Little Starlet"
1969	The Guns of Will Sonnett	Laurie	Episode: "The Man Who Killed Jim Sonnett"
1969	Bonanza	Annie Laurie Adams	Episode: "Sweet Annie Laurie"
1969	Gunsmoke	Sarah Jean Stryker	Episode: "Stryker"
1970	Hawaii Five-O	Freda Cowan	Episode: "The Double Wall"
1970	Days of Our Lives	Janene Whitney #3	17 episodes
1970	The F.B.I.	Hanson	Episode: "The Condemned"
1970	The Silent Force	Louise Hanson	Episode: "A Deadly Game of Love"
1970	Dan August	Harrison's Secretary	Episode: "The Union Forever"
1971	The Bold Ones: The New Doctors	Evelyn Baker	Episode: "Close Up"
1971	The F.B.I.	Carla	Episode: The Deadly Gift
1970–1972	Love, American Style	Alice	2 episodes
1972	The Odd Couple	Trudy Wells	A Night to Dismember
1972	Frogs	Karen Crockett	
1972	The Judge and Jake Wyler	Alicia Dodd	TV movie and series pilot
1972	Night Gallery	Sondra Blanco	Episode: "The Ring with the Red Velvet Ropes"
1972–1973	Temperatures Rising	Annie Carlisle	26 episodes
1973	Mannix	Jennifer Crane	Episode: "The Girl in the Polka Dot Dress"
1973	M*A*S*H	Lt. Erika Johnson	Episode: S2 E3 "Radar's Report"
1974-1975	Big Rose: Double Trouble	Nina	TV movie
1974-1975	Barnaby Jones	Sheila Barner	Episode: "The Challenge"
1974-1975	The Rockford Files	Barbara Kelbaker Susan Alexander Christine Marks	Episode: S1:E9 "Find Me If You Can." Episode: S2:E4 "Resurrection in Black and White." Episode: S3 E12 "There's One in Every Port"
1974-1975	Cannon	Anna Meister // Nona	Episode: "The Man Who Couldn't Forget" /Episode:“Duel in the Desert”
1975	Great Performances	Silia Gala	
1975	Rhoda	Marian Gerard	Episode: "Rhoda Meets the Ex-Wife"
1975	The Last of the Mohicans	Cora Munro (voice)	
1977	The Last Dinosaur	Francesca 'Frankie' Banks	TV movie
1977	Kojak	Detective Jo Lang	Episode: "Lady in the Squadroom"
1977	McMillan (formerly McMillan and Wife)	Georgie	Episode: "Have You Heard About Vanessa?"
1977–1978	We've Got Each Other	Dee Dee Baldwin	13 episodes
1978	Quincy M.E.	Bert Phillips	Episode: "Gone But Not Forgotten"
1978	Quark	Princess Libido	2 episodes
1978	Wonder Woman	Cassandra	Episode: "Time Bomb"
1978–1980	Manta and Moray	Moray (voice)	
1979	Spider-Woman	Jessica Drew/Spider-Woman (voice)	
1979–1984	The Love Boat	Deborah Marshall/Kris Hayley/Mary Sue Huggins	4 episodes
1981	Red Flag: The Ultimate Game	Marie	TV movie
1988	Shakedown on the Sunset Strip	Brenda Allen	TV movie
1988	My First Love	Claire Thomas	TV movie
1990	Always Remember I Love You	Martha "Marty" Mendham	TV movie
1990	Menu for Murder	Julia Alberts	TV movie
1978–1981, 1991	Dallas	Valene Ewing	8 episodes
1979–1993	Knots Landing	Valene Ewing	327 episodes Soap Opera Digest Award for Outstanding Actress in a Leading Role: Prime Time (1986, 1989); TV Land Award – Anniversary Award (2009); Nominated – Soap Opera Digest Award for Outstanding Actress in a Leading Role: Prime Time (1988, 1991)
1993	In the Shadows, Someone's Watching (AKA With Harmful Intent)	Cinnie Merritt	TV movie
1994	Moment of Truth: A Mother's Deception	Nora McGill	TV movie
1995	When the Dark Man Calls	Julianne Kaiser	TV movie
1996	Touched by an Angel	Kim Carpenter	Episode: "'Til We Meet Again"
1996	The Fresh Prince of Bel-Air	Jewel Pemberton	Episode: "Breaking Up Is Hard to Do: Part 1"
1996	Santo Bugito	Amelia (voice)	Episode: "My Name Is Revenge"
1997	Knots Landing: Back to the Cul-de-Sac	Valene Ewing	TV mini-series
1997	Cybill	Herself	Episode: "Mother's Day"
1998	Tracey Takes On...	Self	Episode: "Hollywood"
1998	The Nanny	Margo Lange	Episode: "One False Mole and You're Dead"
1998	Loyal Opposition: Terror in the White House	Vice President Elizabeth Lane	TV movie
2000	Held for Ransom	Nancy Donavan	Direct to video film
2000	It's the Pied Piper, Charlie Brown	Secretary (voice)	TV special
2001	Twice in a Lifetime	Camilla Bianco / Anna	Episode: "Mama Mia"
2001	Son of the Beach	Ima Cummings	Episode: "Light My Firebush"
2001	Heavy Gear: The Animated Series	Commander Crusher Von Krieg (voice)	Episode: "Mercenary Gambit"
2001	UP, Michigan!	Deborah Michaels	
2001	The Weakest Link	Herself	Classic TV Stars Edition #2
2002	Tornado Warning	Mayor McAnders	TV movie
2003	Net Games	Dr. Klein	
2004	The Grim Adventures of Billy & Mandy	Wanda/Woman/Mandy #3 (voice)	Episode: "Whatever Happened to Billy Whatsisname?/Just the Two of Pus"
2004–2005	The Young and the Restless	Gloria Abbott	54 episodes
2005	Diamond Zero	The Hemingway Diamond	
2008	Channels	Megan Phillips	
2009	My Name Is Earl	Janine	Episode: "Friends with Benefits"
2008–2010	Nip/Tuck	Annette Wainwright	2 episodes
2011	Archer	Ruth (voice)	Episode: "Placebo Effect"
2011–2012	Pretty the Series	Miss Senior Someone	
2012	Watercolor Postcards	Momma	
2013	Dallas	Valene Ewing	
2014	The 636	Rose	Short
2015	Fallout 4	Bonnie Tournquist, Phyllis Daily & Roslyn Chambers	Video game
2017	Psycho Wedding Crasher	Aunt Daisy	TV movie
2019	Doom Patrol	Mrs. Franklin (voice)	Episode: "Hair Patrol"
2023	Adventures in Odyssey	Vera Trask (voice)	Episode: S37 E13 "As Far As It Depends On Me"
