= List of My Two Dads episodes =

My Two Dads is an American sitcom that was produced by Michael Jacobs Productions in association with Tri-Star Television and distributed by TeleVentures. It starred Paul Reiser, Greg Evigan and Staci Keanan. The series premiered on NBC on September 20, 1987, and aired 60 episodes over three seasons, concluding on April 30, 1990.

== Series overview ==
Season	Episodes	Originally released	
Season	Episodes	First released	Last released
1	22	September 20, 1987	August 14, 1988
2	16	January 11, 1989	July 29, 1989
3	22	September 24, 1989	April 30, 1990

== Episodes ==
=== Season 1 (1987–88) ===
No. overall	No. in season	Title	Directed by	Original release date	Prod. code	Rating/share (households)
1	1	"Pilot"	John Tracy	September 20, 1987	101	19.5/30
In 1974, Michael Taylor and Joey Harris were best friends. However, the two developed a rivalry when they both competed for the affections of a girl: Marcy Bradford, and subsequently cut ties from each other. Thirteen years later, Michael and Joey are reunited for the reading of the now deceased Marcy's will and discover they have been granted joint custody of her 12-year old daughter, Nicole. Which of the two is the father? The judge declares they both are. Although the two men initially have difficulty dealing with the newfound responsibility of fatherhood, and with each other, they agree to put their differences aside for Nicole's sake. Different opening credits, and a different theme song were used for this episode — the 1985 hit "You're a Friend of Mine," by Clarence Clemons and Jackson Browne.
2	2	"Soho's By You"	Peter Baldwin	September 27, 1987	102	18.1/28
The family realizes it is better to cohabit in one residence. When the family experiment with moving into Michael's upscale apartment, Joey has difficulty fitting into uptown life, and Nicole has no playmates in their new building. They opt to live in Joey's hip loft. An opening, similar to A-ha's "Take On Me", was used for this episode, complete with a theme song sung by Greg Evigan, called "You Can Count on Me".
3	3	"Crime and Punishment"	Peter Baldwin	October 4, 1987	103	18.6/28
The dads reach a turning point in fatherhood, where they have to put their foot down, upon learning Nicole and a friend have gone to a party in New Jersey...with boys...instead of to the movies. Guest star: Willie Garson Note: A new opening featuring narration from Staci Keanan was used for this episode. Half of the theme song's lyrics are cut.
4	4	"Nicole's First Date"	Peter Baldwin	October 18, 1987	104	18.8/27
Joey prepares Nicole for her first date. Unfortunately, his lecture didn't prepare her for being stood up. Note: Another new narration from Staci Keanan was used for this episode.
5	5	"Friends and Lovers"	Peter Baldwin	October 25, 1987	105	16.6/23
Nicole sets Michael up with a neighbor. He finds the situation confusing when he can't decide if they're dating or just friends. Note: The opening narration by Staci Keanan in this episode returns to the version first used in Episode 3.
6	6	"Who's Night is it, Anyway?"	Peter Baldwin	November 1, 1987	106	18.0/26
When both dads have dates, they decide to let Nicole stay home alone with her friends.
7	7	"Once a Son..."	Peter Baldwin	November 8, 1987	107	18.1/27
Joey makes a deal with his father. He'll join the family plumbing business if his art doesn't sell at an upcoming one-man show.
8	8	"Sex, Judge, and Rock and Roll"	J. D. Lobue	November 15, 1987	108	16.4/24
Michael gets a date with a woman that turned Joey down. Unfortunately, the woman is Judge Wilbur's engaged niece.
9	9	"The Artful Dodger"	J. D. Lobue	November 29, 1987	109	17.7/25
When Nicole has a failing grade in art, Joey rushes to her defense. He ends up dating the teacher, something that makes Nicole very unhappy.
10	10	"Quality Time"	J. D. Lobue	December 6, 1987	110	16.2/24
Michael suffers from guilt when business forces him to cancel dates with Nicole.
11	11	"Tis the Season"	Zane Buzby	December 20, 1987	111	16.4/25
Joey and Michael are excited to celebrate their first Christmas with Nicole. Unfortunately, she wants to ignore the holiday because it will be her first without her mom.
12	12	"The Only Child"	Zane Buzby	January 3, 1988	112	19.5/28
Nicole misses being the center of attention when her dads fulfill her wish for a little brother.
13	13	"Joey's Mother-in-Law"	Zane Buzby	January 10, 1988	113	22.9/33
When Michael's mom comes for a visit, she makes Joey miserable and stops Nicole from seeing Cory. Guest star: Polly Bergen as Evelyn Taylor, Michael's mother.
14	14	"Nicole in Charge"	Zane Buzby	January 17, 1988	114	18.8/27
Upset and worried when Michael ends up in the hospital after training, Nicole demands the loft's racquetball championship be cancelled.
15	15	"The Wedge"	Zane Buzby	February 7, 1988	115	14.7/21
Joey's rock star friend visits. He believes Michael has been a bad influence on Joey. Guest star: Davy Jones (of The Monkees) as Malcolm O'Dell, Joey's rock star friend.
16	16	"Advice and Consent"	Andrew D. Weyman	February 14, 1988	116	13.4/19
Cory needs kissing help, so his older brother and the dads try to give him some guidance.
17	17	"She'll Get Over It"	Zane Buzby	February 21, 1988	117	17.0/24
When Nicole's first modeling audition goes badly, Michael uses his influence to cheer her up. Guest star: Scott Baio
18	18	"Michael's Sister Comes Over and Visits"	Valentine Mayer	February 28, 1988	118	14.4/21
When Michael's sister left her medical career, she and Michael became estranged. Now she's come back to visit, and Michael is unhappy to learn that Joey is the person who convinced her to leave.
19	19	"Nicole's Big Adventure"	Zane Buzby	March 19, 1988	119	15.1/26
Nicole spends a week away at camp, and the dads need help from friends to survive the loneliness.
20	20	"My Fair Joey"	Andrew D. Weyman	March 28, 1988	120	16.7/25
Joey asks for Michael's help. He wants to be presentable when meeting his new date's father. Unfortunately, she's the woman of Michael's dreams.
21	21	"The Family in Question"	Mark Brull	May 9, 1988	121	14.4/23
When a newspaper reporter writes an article criticizing Judge Wilbur, especially her decision to put Nicole with Joey and Michael, a television reporter decides to do a feature on them by interviewing everyone involved and recording Nicole with her two fathers to see who is right. Guest stars: Dr. Joyce Brothers, Ed Koch
22	22	"A Friend of the Family"	Matthew Diamond	August 14, 1988	122	8.5/16 (Note: This episode was also watched by 11.9 million viewers)
Cory's brother must repay the damage he caused to Klawicki's front door.

=== Season 2 (1989) ===
No. overall	No. in season	Title	Directed by	Written by	Original release date	Prod. code	US viewers (millions)
23	1	"Blast From the Past"	Andrew D. Weyman	Bob Myer	January 11, 1989	7202	19.4
Nicole's first co-ed party sees Cory clash with an ex, and Joey being respected as an elder. Note: In season 2, a new opening sequence, featuring a new version of "You Can Count on Me" – still sung by Greg Evigan, and with the missing lyrics restored – but with Staci Keanan's narration taken out, debuted.
24	2	"Who's on First?"	Andrew D. Weyman	Bob Young	January 18, 1989	7204	20.9
Joey and Michael are having trouble adjusting to the fact that Nicole is starting to be interested in boys.
25	3	"Macho, Stupid Guy Time"	Andrew D. Weyman	Chuck Lorre	February 1, 1989	7209	22.1
Michael and Joey vie to date an attractive woman they went to high school with, and the attention couldn't make her happier. Guest star: Morgan Fairchild
26	4	"The Man in the Pink Slip"	Andrew D. Weyman	Bob Young	February 8, 1989	7205	17.3
A buyout leaves Michael dejected at home, and sends Joey into a new environment for him — the business world. Guest star: Russell Johnson
27	5	"Fallen Idol"	Andrew D. Weyman	David Steven Simon	February 15, 1989	7203	20.7
Joey's rocker friend visits when he needs an idea for his next album. Guest stars: Davy Jones (second appearance), Peter Noone
28	6	"Story with a Twist"	Andrew D. Weyman	David Steven Simon	February 22, 1989	7210	20.3
When Nicole comes home smelling of alcohol, Michael and Joey use an unorthodox method to teach her a lesson.
29	7	"Playing with Fire"	Mark Brull	Story by : Michael Jacobs; Teleplay by : Bob Myer & Bob Young & Chuck Lorre	March 1, 1989	7213	22.6
When an arsonist may seek revenge on Judge Wilbur, Joey and Michael hire protection for her: Bull Shannon. Guest star: Richard Moll crosses over his character Bull Shannon from Night Court in this episode.
30	8	"Dirty Dating"	Andrew D. Weyman	Story by : Mindy Glazer & Robert Schwartz; Teleplay by : Robert Schwartz	March 8, 1989	7211	22.4
Nicole cuts her nose to spite her face when she goes out with a guy she knows is bad news to get back at Joey for not following her advice.
31	9	"The God of Love"	Andrew D. Weyman	Chuck Lorre	March 15, 1989	7212	20.7
After Joey gets caught with a girl in the house, Nicole tells all of her friends, who now worships Joey like he is "The God Of Love". Is it more than Joey bargained for?
32	10	"In Her Dreams"	Andrew D. Weyman	Michael Jacobs	March 22, 1989	7201	20.8
Nicole's dreams reveal how her life might be different if her mom had married Joey or Michael. Guest star: Emma Samms (as Nicole's late mother, Marcy)
33	11	"Together We Stand"	Andrew D. Weyman	Bob Myer	March 29, 1989	7207	15.3
Joey and Michael start work at a new magazine, with Joey having the slightly better first day.
34	12	"The Courtship of Nicole's Fathers"	Florence Stanley & Patrick Maloney	Chuck Lorre	April 5, 1989	7215	19.5
Nicole happily finds that Liz, a beautiful new neighbor is keeping her dads preoccupied from pestering her. Guest star: Crystal Bernard
35	13	"Crushed"	Mark Brull	Michael Jacobs	April 12, 1989	7214	20.2
Nicole's best friend Shelby falls in love with... her dad?
36	14	"Basket Case"	Andrew D. Weyman	Michael Jacobs	April 19, 1989	7216	17.5
Joey is livid when Nicole gets cut from her school basketball team. Meanwhile, Michael is convinced that he is dying when his insurance company charges him a high premium after assessing him as a Type A personality.
37	15	"You Love Me, Right?"	Andrew D. Weyman	Martin Newman	May 7, 1989	7206	15.5
Michael's uncle, Raymond, visits, and he hopes his uncle's predilection for bailing on plans has stopped. Guest star: Jan Murray
38	16	"Getting Smart"	Andrew D. Weyman	Gina Wendkos	July 29, 1989	7208	11.9
When her dads' actions show her that men aren't attracted to smart women, Nicole opts out of her high-level English class.

=== Season 3 (1989–90) ===
No. overall	No. in season	Title	Directed by	Original release date	Prod. code	US viewers (millions)
39	1	"That's No Lady, That's My Mother"	Florence Stanley and Mark Brull	September 24, 1989	7302	18.8
Michael is out dating again; but this time, he finds himself dating Nicole's boyfriend's mother. Note: Another new opening, along with another new version of the theme song "You Can Count on Me" featuring a brassy lead, debuted in season 3.
40	2	"Say Goodnight, Gracie"	Florence Stanley and Mark Brull	October 1, 1989	7304	16.9
Joey decides to be considerate and watch his girlfriend's baby, Gracie. It turns out to be more than the two men can handle, as the baby ends up staying all night, disrupting Michael's work, and waking up Judge Wilbur in the process.
41	3	"Love and Learn"	Andy Cadiff	October 15, 1989	7305	17.8
Nicole breaks her fathers' rules by dating a college guy.
42	4	"You Can Count on Me"	Mark Brull	October 22, 1989	7301	16.0
Hearing a guy's overconfident dating scheme leaves Joey and Michael fearful of Nicole getting taken advantage of by a similar guy.
43	5	"Joey Gets Pinned"	Mark Brull	October 29, 1989	7303	21.5
Joey holds a bachelor party for a friend at his place. He ends up meeting a lady friend – a wrestler – and then ends up marrying her.
44	6	"Story in Development"	Andy Cadiff	November 1, 1989	7306	17.1
Nicole feels physically inadequate compared to a classmate, and her dads admit to feeling the same inadequacy.
45	7	"Duel"	Patrick Maloney	November 5, 1989	7307	18.6
Michael and Joey land a job chaperoning Nicole's school dance. Nicole, however, decides to sit the dance out because it's lady's choice and she can't possibly choose between Zach and Cory.
46	8	"Dad Patrol"	Madeline Cripe	November 8, 1989	7308	17.9
Joey and Michael start a neighborhood watch when a burglary costs Nicole a precious memento.
47	9	"Pop, the Question"	Michael Jacobs	November 15, 1989	7309	18.2
When a counselor feels the question of Nicole's paternity is the source of squabbling between Joey and Michael, he offers the option of a DNA test to settle the issue.
48	10	"Thanks for the Memories"	Patrick Maloney	November 22, 1989	7311	16.8
Michael and Joey are stuck in the elevator on their way to Thanksgiving dinner. As they pass the time, they reminisce over the past couple of years.
49	11	"Class"	Florence Stanley and Mark Brull	November 29, 1989	7310	18.2
Joey's final class to complete his college degree is taught by Michael.
50	12	"I'm Dreaming of a Holiday Episode"	Michael Lembeck	December 20, 1989	7312	18.4
It's the holidays, and Joey is dreaming of what holidays and life would be like if they were older... a lot older.
51	13	"Power Struggle"	Jeff Melman	January 10, 1990	7313	16.6
When the dads fear Nicole and Zach are becoming too close too quickly, they order Nicole to see other boys. Nicole devises a plan to prove to her dads that Zach is the right boy for her by bringing home the date from hell.
52	14	"Bye Bye Baby"	Jeff Melman	January 21, 1990	7314	12.9
Joey is stunned when he learns that his girlfriend Sarah, and her baby Gracie, are both moving away to San Francisco.
53	15	"Enviro-Mental Case"	Jeff Melman	March 5, 1990	7316	18.2
Joey gets thrown in jail for environmental protests, so Michael and Judge Wilbur have to bail him out.
54	16	"Party, Sweet 16: See Appendix"	Jeff Melman	March 12, 1990	7315	18.3
Nicole's sweet sixteen party gets canceled due to appendicitis.
55	17	"It's My Art, and I'll Die If I Want To"	Jeff Melman	March 19, 1990	7321	16.7
Joey finally gets himself in the paper – in the obituary section. Art galleries call offering loads of money for his artwork, and he's fine pretending to be dead.
56	18	"To Thine Own Elf, Be True"	Jeff Melman	March 26, 1990	7317	15.2
Joey's old high school flame comes back to New York, and gets attracted to Michael.
57	19	"You Only Surprise the Ones You Love"	Jeff Melman	April 2, 1990	7318	17.0
When Judge Wilbur is going to be honored, Joey, Michael, and Nicole think it would nice if some of her friends and family were there. The only problem is they don't know any of her friends and family, or if she even has any. So they do a little snooping around and find a picture of her and someone named Louis, and thinking he was a friend, invite him. Guest star: Robert Mandan
58	20	"Kind of a Drag"	Florence Stanley	April 16, 1990	7322	14.8
Nicole is devastated when she finds out she has been put on the "out list" at school. Meanwhile, Joey is dealing with a girlfriend who just won't let him break up.
59	21	"When You Wish..."	Jeff Melman	April 23, 1990	7320	12.0
Nicole enters a Rock TV music channel contest, which she wins, and she gets to go on a musical dream date of her choice. Her dads also get to live out their own fantasies in the process – Michael playing the piano live in front of a national TV audience, and Joey playing basketball... with Dr. J?!
60	22	"See You in September?"	Jeff Melman	April 30, 1990	7319	13.8
Joey's girlfriend Sarah wants to marry ... another guy. Joey stops the wedding and gets back together with Sarah, but is faced with a tough choice – move to San Francisco, or stay with Nicole in New York. Note: Although this was not the last episode to be produced, it was intended to air as the series finale.
