= Staci Keanan =

American attorney and former actress (born 1975)

- Born: Anastasia Love Sagorsky; June 6, 1975 (age 51); Devon, Pennsylvania, U.S.
- Other names: Anastasia Sagorsky; Stacy Keanan
- Education: University of California, Los Angeles (BA); Southwestern Law School (JD)
- Occupations: Actress (1987–1998, 2004–2010); Attorney (2013–present); Podcast (2024–present)
- Known for: My Two Dads; Step by Step
- Spouse: Guy Birtwhistle (m. 2017)

Anastasia Love Sagorsky (born June 6, 1975), known professionally as Staci Keanan, is an American attorney and former actress. She is best known for her television roles as Nicole Bradford on the NBC sitcom My Two Dads (1987–1990) and Dana Foster on the ABC/CBS sitcom Step by Step (1991–1998). In 2013, she was admitted to the State Bar of California, where she practices law under her birth name.

== Biography ==
=== 1975–1987: Early life and work ===
Keanan was born in Devon, Pennsylvania, the daughter of Jacqueline (née Love) and Irving Sagorsky, a car salesman. She has a sister, Pilar Sagorsky Stein.

At age five, she began modeling and appeared in print, radio, and television advertisements, including television commercials for My Little Pony, Burger King and Hershey's Kisses. As a youth, Keanan moved with her mother and sister to New York City, where she changed her name to "Staci Love" and began appearing in summer stock. She made her credited television debut in the 1987 miniseries I'll Take Manhattan.

=== 1987–2010: Acting career ===
At the age of 12, shortly after she moved with her family to Los Angeles, she was cast as Nicole Bradford in the TV series My Two Dads (1987–1990). After the end of My Two Dads, Keanan starred on the short-lived ABC sitcom Going Places (1990–1991) with Alan Ruck, Heather Locklear, and Hallie Todd. The following year, she was cast as Dana Foster in the TV series Step by Step (1991–1998). By 1997, Keanan had changed her name from Staci to Stacy.

Keanan had roles in the short Stolen Poem (2004) and the films Hidden Secrets (2006), and Death and Cremation (2010) with Brad Dourif, Jeremy Sumpter, and Daniel Baldwin. In 2009, Keanan appeared in Holyman Undercover, and in 2010, she appeared in a cameo in You Again with Step by Step castmates Christine Lakin and Patrick Duffy. She also co-starred in the 2009 film Sarah's Choice.

=== 2010–present: Transition into law and podcast ===
Keanan attended Southwestern Law School and was admitted to the State Bar of California in 2013. Leaving Hollywood behind, she practices law under her birth name, Anastasia Sagorsky, in the Los Angeles area. In 2014, Keanan worked as a Deputy District Attorney in the Riverside County District Attorney's office prosecuting felony cases involving violent crime or death. Keanan joined the Los Angeles County District Attorney's office as a Deputy District Attorney in 2016. In January 2021, she became an adjunct associate professor of law at Southwestern Law School.

She has hosted the Step by Step rewatch podcast Keanan and Lakin Give You Déjà Vu with co-star Christine Lakin since February 28, 2024.

== Personal life ==
In 2002, Keanan graduated cum laude with a Bachelor of Arts degree in Art History and a minor in French from UCLA. Her academic honors include membership in the Golden Key International Honour Society and Phi Beta Kappa honor societies.

On February 11, 2017, Keanan married actor and producer Guy Birtwhistle.

== Filmography ==
Film roles
Year	Title	Role	Notes
1990	Lisa	Lisa	Alternative title: Candlelight Killer
1994	Skooled		Short film
1995	Ski Hard	Annie Meyers	Alternative titles: Downhill Willie, Ski Nuts
1995	The Red Coat	Mary	Short film
1997	Nowhere	Ever	
2004	Stolen Poem	Jamie	Short film
2006	Hidden Secrets	Rachel Wilson	
2009	Sarah's Choice	Denise	
2010	Holyman Undercover	Carmen	
2010	You Again	Dana	
2010	Death and Cremation	Becky Weaver	

Television roles
Year	Title	Role	Notes
1987	I'll Take Manhattan	Angelica Cipriani	Television miniseries Credited as Staci Love
1987–1990	My Two Dads	Nicole Bradford	60 episodes
1990	Casey's Gift: For Love of a Child	Kathy Stilwell	Television movie
1990–1991	Going Places	Lindsay Bowen	22 episodes
1991–1998	Step by Step	Dana Foster	159 episodes
1996	Boy Meets World	Dana Foster	Episode: "The Happiest Show on Earth"
1997	Lois & Clark: The New Adventures of Superman	Becky Samms	Episode: "I've Got You Under My Skin"
1998	Cybill	Lacy	Episode: "Fine Is Not a Feeling"
1998	Diagnosis: Murder	Cindy Garrett	Episode: "Till Death Do Us Part"

== Stage ==
=== Musical theatre ===
- Miss Lulu Bett, Berkshire Theater Festival, Stockbridge, Massachusetts
- Annie, Theatre at Stagedoor Manor, Loch Sheldrake, New York
- Georgia Avenue, Goodspeed Opera House, East Haddam, Connecticut
- The King and I, Norma Terris Theatre, Chester, Connecticut
- Gypsy, Norma Terris Theatre, Chester, Connecticut

=== Plays ===
- Old Glories, two one-act plays by Elliot Shoenman, directed by Mark L. Taylor, Zephyr Theatre, Hollywood, California
  - Above the Fold (Diane), Zephyr Theatre, Hollywood, California
  - Red Flags (Janet), Zephyr Theatre, Hollywood, California
- Moment in the Sun (Diane Bellini), by Elliot Shoenman, Matrix Theatre, Hollywood, California
- Last Call at Moby Dick's (Caroline), by Ed Marill, directed by Mark L. Taylor, McCadden Place Theatre, Hollywood, California
- Sunset Park (Young Evelyn) second run, by Marley Sims and Elliot Shoenman, directed by Mark L. Taylor, Zephyr Theatre, Hollywood, California

== Awards ==
Year	Award	Category	Work	Result	Refs
1988	Young Artist Award	Best Young Actress Starring in a New Television Comedy Series	My Two Dads	Won	
