= My Two Dads =

American sitcom (1987–1990)

- Genre: Family sitcom
- Created by: Michael Jacobs; Danielle Alexandra
- Starring: Paul Reiser; Greg Evigan; Staci Keanan; Florence Stanley; Dick Butkus; Giovanni Ribisi; Chad Allen
- Theme music composer: Greg Evigan, Lenny Macaluso & Michael Jacobs
- Opening theme: "You Can Count on Me," performed by Greg Evigan
- Ending theme: "You Can Count on Me" (instrumental)
- Composers: Don Peake (1987–1988); Ray Colcord (1988–1990)
- Country of origin: United States
- Original language: English
- No. of seasons: 3
- No. of episodes: 60 (list of episodes)

Production
- Executive producer: Michael Jacobs
- Camera setup: Videotape; Multi-camera
- Running time: approx. 22 minutes
- Production companies: Michael Jacobs Productions; Tri-Star Television (1987) (season 1); Columbia Pictures Television (1988–1990) (seasons 1–3)

Original release
- Network: NBC
- Release: September 20, 1987 – April 30, 1990

My Two Dads is an American sitcom television series that was produced by Michael Jacobs Productions in association with Tri-Star Television (later Columbia Pictures Television) and distributed by TeleVentures. It stars Paul Reiser, Greg Evigan, and Staci Keanan. The series premiered on NBC on September 20, 1987, airing three seasons through to April 30, 1990.

== Synopsis ==
"This is me, Nicole Bradford. Cute, huh? This is my dad and this is my dad. How did I get two dads? They inherited me. This is the judge who brought us together. She's here to make sure we're one happy family, with one dad who's down to earth and one dad with his head in the clouds!"

— Nicole Bradford's opening narration.

The series begins in 1987, after Marcy Bradford (only seen in the second-season episode "In Her Dreams"), the mother of 12-year-old Nicole Bradford, has died. The two men who had competed for Marcy's affections in Key West during the summer of 1974 — Michael Taylor, a successful but slightly neurotic financial advisor, and Joey Harris, a struggling, but laid-back artist (former friends turned rivals over their mutual interest in Marcy) — are awarded joint custody of Nicole.

Each week, the mix-ups and trials of two single men raising a teenage daughter provide the stories. Judge Margaret V. Wilbur, a family court judge who gave custody of Nicole to Michael and Joey, frequently visits the new family. She bought the building in which Joey lived, so is now the live-in landlord. Michael originally has his own condo uptown, but in episode two of the first season, Nicole stages a sit-in at school because she feels she had no home, and the men decide it is better to all live in one home. They choose Joey's loft.

Nicole's paternity is never revealed on the show, but in the episode "Pop, the Question," Michael and Joey – after a falling out – have a DNA test to determine which of them is Nicole's biological father. The test is conducted against Nicole's wishes; she is happier not knowing who her true father is, and she destroys the results before opening them. Michael and Joey later resolve their differences and reconcile. Judge Wilbur looks at the results, but throws them away without revealing them to the audience.

The series comes to an end (in the episode called "See You in September?") when Joey reconnects with a former girlfriend named Sarah, and moves to San Francisco to live with her and her daughter, Grace. He stays in contact with Nicole, while Michael and Judge Wilbur remain in New York. Nicole writes a letter to Joey, in which she makes reference to going out to San Francisco to visit, and she ends by saying that no matter what, or where he is, or who he is with, she would always be happy with him as one of her two dads.

== Cast and characters ==
=== Cast ===
The lead cast of My Two Dads: Paul Reiser and Greg Evigan (top); Staci Keanan (bottom)

- Paul Reiser as Michael Taylor
- Greg Evigan as Joey Harris
- Staci Keanan as Nicole Bradford
- Florence Stanley as Judge Margaret V. Wilbur
- Giovanni Ribisi (credited as Vonni Ribisi) as Cory Kupkus
- Dick Butkus as Ed Klawicki (seasons 1 & 2)
- Chad Allen as Zach Nichols (seasons 2 & 3)
- Amy Hathaway as Shelby Haskell (seasons 2 & 3)

=== Characters ===
The series regularly featured Giovanni Ribisi and Chad Allen as two boys (Cory Kupkus and Zach Nichols, respectively) who competed for Nicole's affections, similar to how her two dads had done for her mother's. Florence Stanley appeared as Judge Margaret Wilbur, who was responsible for assigning Nicole's custody, and who regularly looked over the family; she was also their landlady, being the resident owner of the apartment building where the family lived. Amy Hathaway played Nicole's worldly best friend, Shelby Haskell. The cast was rounded out by former football player Dick Butkus, who managed the cafe on the building's first floor. The cafe (Klawicki's) was the second spot in the show around which a plot usually revolved; the first being the family's apartment. In the third season, when Dick Butkus left the series, the diner was then run by cook Julian (Don), but there was no explanation as to what happened to Ed Klawicki. Ownership of the diner was explained to have been taken over by Judge Wilbur at this point, and it was renamed The Judge's Court Cafe.

=== Night Court crossover ===
My Two Dads had crossovers with another NBC show, Night Court. Judge Margaret W. Wilbur, played by Florence Stanley, appeared on Night Court. In turn, Richard Moll guest starred as his Night Court character Bull Shannon in the My Two Dads episode "Playing with Fire", protecting Judge Wilbur from a recently released criminal that she had sent to prison years before.

== Episodes ==
Season	Episodes	Originally released	
Season	Episodes	First released	Last released
1	22	September 20, 1987	August 14, 1988
2	16	January 11, 1989	July 29, 1989
3	22	September 24, 1989	April 30, 1990

== Broadcast ==
In August 1990, USA Network paid Columbia Pictures Television Distribution about $250,000 an episode, for as many as 15 runs over a three-year period, a price that was the syndication record until Major Dad surpassed that price two years later. Reruns of the show aired on the USA Network through the 1990s and again in the early 2000s.

From 2017 to 2021 and since 2026, the show aired on Antenna TV. It began airing on Rewind TV in 2022.

== Home media ==
Shout! Factory (under license from Sony Pictures Home Entertainment) has released the first two seasons of My Two Dads on DVD in Region 1. Season 2 was released as a Shout! Factory Exclusives title, available exclusively through their online store.

Mill Creek Entertainment released a ten-episode best-of set entitled My Two Dads – You Can Count on Me on March 22, 2011. The single disc release features episodes from the first two seasons.

DVD name	Ep #	Release date	Special Features
The Complete First Season	22	March 3, 2009	A look back at My Two Dads with Greg Evigan and Staci Keanan.
The Complete Second Season	16	March 16, 2010	N/A

== Awards ==
Year	Award	Category	Recipient	Result	Refs
1988	Young Artist Awards	The Most Promising New Fall Television Series	My Two Dads	Won	
1988	Young Artist Awards	Best Young Actress Featured, Co-starring, Supporting, Recurring Role in a Comedy or Drama Series or Special	Staci Keanan	Won	
1988	People's Choice Awards	Favorite New TV Comedy Program	My Two Dads	Won	
1989	Young Artist Awards	Best Young Actor Guest Starring in a Drama or Comedy Series	Chad Allen	Won	
