= Antoine Le Métel d'Ouville =

Antoine Le Métel d'Ouville, (c. 1589 in Caen – 1655), was a 17th-century French engineer, geographer, poet and playwright.

== Presentation ==
The brother of François Le Métel de Boisrobert, d'Ouville had some comedies presented, less remarkable for their versification than by the plot, among others les Trahisons d'Abhiran, a tragicomedy successfully given in 1637.

He also authored les nouvelles amoureuses et exemplaires; Aymer sans sçavoir qui, comedy; La Coifeuse à la mode, comedy; les Fausses Véritez, comedy; les Morts vivants, tragicomedy; l'Esprit follet, comedy; la Fouyne de Séville, ou l'hameçon des bourses; l'Absent chez soy; l'Élite des contes; les Contes aux heures perdues ou Le recueil de tous les bons mots, réparties, équivoques du sieur d'Ouville; Jodelet astrologue, encouraged by Scarron's success.

Under his name we also have Tales (2 vol. in-12), partly drawn from Moyen de parvenir which was attributed to his brother. He translated from Spanish to French.

== Works ==
- Les Trahizons d'Arbiran, tragicomedy
- 1634: Stances a Monseigneur le Cardinal duc de Richelieu…
- 1642: L'Esprit follet, comedy (imitated from Calderón)
- 1643: L'Absent chez soy, five-act comedy, in verse
- 1643: Les contes aux heures perdues du sieur d'Ouville ou Le recueil de tous les bons mots, réparties, équivoques
- 1643: Les Fausses Infidelitez, five-act comedy
- 1645: La Dame suivante, comedy
- 1646: Jodelet astrologue, five-act comedy
- 1646: Les Morts vivants, tragicomedy
- 1647: Aymer sans sçavoir qui, comedy
- 1647: La Coifeuse à la mode, comedy
- 1650: Les Soupçons sur les apparences, héroïco-comedy
- 1680: L'Élite des contes

Translations

- La Fouyne de Séville, ou L'hameçon des bourses, Alonso de Castillo Solórzano, 1661
- Histoire de dona Rufine, dite la fameuse courtisane de Séville, Alonso de Castillo Solórzano, 1731
- Les Nouvelles amoureuses et exemplaires, María de Zayas y Sotomayor, 1656

=== Recent editions ===
- Théâtre complet, t. I, édition de Monica Pavesio, Classiques Garnier, 2013 ISBN 978-2812409332 (includes L'Esprit follet, Les Fausses Vérités, Jodelet astrologue)
- Théâtre complet, t. II, édition de Anne Teulade, Classiques Garnier, 2013 ISBN 978-2812409332 (includes L'Absent chez soi, Les Trahisons d'Arbiran, Les Soupçons sur les apparences)
