= The Last Winter (1984 film) =

- Directed by: Riki Shelach Nissimoff
- Screenplay by: John Herzfeld
- Produced by: Mota Gorfung; Avi Lerner
- Starring: Yona Elian; Kathleen Quinlan; Stephen Macht; Zipora Peled; Michael Schneider
- Cinematography: Amnon Salomon
- Edited by: Kevin Connor
- Music by: Nachum Heiman
- Production company: Lerko Productions Limited
- Distributed by: Tri-Star Pictures
- Release date: June 21, 1984
- Running time: 89 minutes
- Countries: United States, Israel
- Language: English
- Budget: $700,000

The Last Winter is a 1984 drama film directed by Riki Shelach Nissimoff and produced by Avi Lerner. The film was a joint American-Israeli venture which tells the story of two women seeking leads to their missing husbands after the end of the Yom Kippur War. A relationship builds between them when each identifies her husband in the same blurred image of a foreign newsreel.
