= Top-rated United States television programs of 1984–85 =

This table displays the top-rated primetime television series of the 1984–85 season as measured by Nielsen Media Research.

Rank	Program	Network	Rating
1	Dynasty	ABC	25.0
2	Dallas	CBS	24.7
3	The Cosby Show	NBC	24.2
4	60 Minutes	CBS	22.2
5	Family Ties	NBC	22.1
6	The A-Team	NBC	21.9
7	Simon & Simon	CBS	21.8
8	Murder, She Wrote	CBS	20.1
9	Knots Landing	CBS	20.0
10	Falcon Crest	CBS	19.9
10	Crazy Like a Fox	CBS	19.9
12	Hotel	ABC	19.7
12	Cheers	NBC	19.7
14	Riptide	NBC	19.2
15	Magnum, P.I.	CBS	19.1
16	Newhart	CBS	18.4
17	Kate & Allie	CBS	18.3
18	NBC Monday Night Movie	NBC	18.2
19	Highway to Heaven	NBC	17.7
20	Night Court	NBC	17.6
21	ABC Sunday Night Movie	ABC	17.5
22	Scarecrow & Mrs. King	CBS	17.1
22	TV's Bloopers & Practical Jokes	NBC	17.1
22	The Fall Guy	ABC	17.1
25	Monday Night Football	ABC	17.0
25	Remington Steele	NBC	17.0
25	Webster	ABC	17.0
28	Cagney & Lacey	CBS	16.9
29	Trapper John, M.D.	CBS	16.8
30	Hill Street Blues	NBC	16.6

== See also ==
Year-end ratings for TV shows (newspapers.com: lists top 75 shows for the year)
