= James Nesbitt filmography =

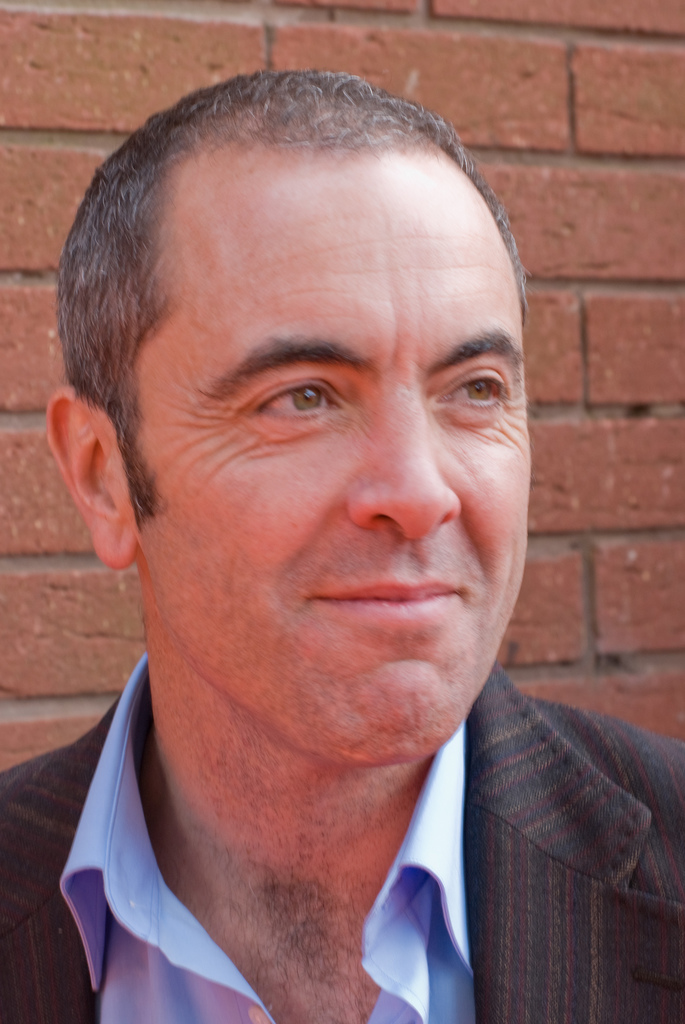
Nesbitt in 2008

James Nesbitt is an actor from Northern Ireland whose filmography encompasses both television and film roles over a 30-year period. Nesbitt's screen career began in the early 1980s with uncredited roles in episodes of the BBC Play For Today strand, which he had while attached to the Riverside Theatre's youth group. His first credited role came in 1989, as a bit player in the John Ogdon biopic Virtuoso, which was followed by his first feature film role in 1991 in Hear My Song.

As a casual actor in the early 1990s, Nesbitt mixed television and film roles; he appeared in episodes of Boon, The Young Indiana Jones Chronicles, Covington Cross, Lovejoy, and Between the Lines. He also played roles in several Michael Winterbottom films, beginning with Loves Lies Bleeding in 1993 and continuing with Go Now in 1995, Jude in 1996 and Welcome to Sarajevo in 1997.

In 1997, he secured his breakout television role as Adam Williams in Cold Feet, a character he played until 2003 and again from 2016 until 2020. In that time he also appeared in the film Waking Ned, two series of Playing the Field, Touching Evil, his feature film lead debut Lucky Break, and Paul Greengrass's controversial television film Bloody Sunday, as Ivan Cooper. After Bloody Sunday, Nesbitt started to take on more dramatic roles, appearing in five series of Murphy's Law (2003–2007), the two-part television film Passer By (2004), Steven Moffat's Jekyll (2007), and the Iraq War drama Occupation (2009). He has also furthered his feature film career by taking roles in Woody Allen's Match Point (2005), the Troubles drama Five Minutes of Heaven (2009), the thriller Outcast (2010), Nadia Tass's Matching Jack (2010), and Emilio Estevez's The Way (2010). He starred in the ITV medical drama series Monroe (2011–2012) and has a role as the dwarf Bofur in Peter Jackson's The Hobbit trilogy (2012–2014).

Nesbitt has also taken on theatrical roles throughout his career; between 1987 and 1994, he appeared in no less than five major plays, including the musical Up on the Roof, a world tour of Hamlet, and the Troubles drama Paddywack. After a break of eleven years, Nesbitt returned to the stage to make his London West End debut in Owen McCafferty's Shoot the Crow (2005).

== Filmography ==
=== Television ===
Television acting roles
Year(s)	Title	Role	Description
1982	Play for Today Too Late to Talk to Billy	Extra	Television film (Note: Uncredited extra.)
1984	Play for Today: The Cry	B Special	Television film
1985	The Ties of Blood: Out of Tune	Extra	Television film
1989	Screen Two: Virtuoso	[Bit part]	Television film (Note: Credited television debut.)
1991	Boon	Martin Mulholland	1 episode of television series: "Stamp Duty"
1992	The Young Indiana Jones Chronicles	Yuri	1 episode of television series: "Germany, Mid-August 1916"
1992	Covington Cross	Humphrey	1 episode of television series: "The Hero"
1993	Comedy Playhouse: Sailortown	Skeeball	Television film
1993	Screenplay: Love Lies Bleeding	Niall	Television film (Note: First appearance in a Michael Winterbottom production.)
1993	Lovejoy	Jerry Boyle	1 episode of television series: "The Kakiemon Tiger"
1994	Between the Lines	Sean Phellan	1 episode of television series: "Unknown Soldier"
1994	The All New Alexei Sayle Show	Various characters	2 episodes of television series: Series 1, Episode 1; Series 1, Episode 3
1995	Searching	Duncan	2 episodes of television series: Series 1, Episode 1; Series 1, Episode 6
1995	Go Now	Tony	Television film with limited theatrical release
1995	Soldier Soldier	Bryan Casey	1 episode of television series: "Sweet Revenge"
1996–1998	Ballykissangel	Leo McGarvey	5 episodes of television series: "The Power and the Gory" (1996); "I Know When I'm Not Wanted" (1998); "Personal Call" (1998); "Lost Sheep" (1998); "Amongst Friends" (1998)
1997	Common As Muck	Priest	1 episode of television series: Series 2, Episode 2
1997	Comedy Premieres: Cold Feet	Adam Williams	Television pilot
1998–1999	Playing the Field	John Dolan	2 series of television series
1998	Touching Evil II	David Laney	2 episodes of television series: "Scalping, Part 1"; "Scalping, Part 2"
1998–2003, 2016–2020	Cold Feet	Adam Williams	All 9 series
2001	Murphy's Law	DS Tommy Murphy	Television pilot
2002	Bloody Sunday	Ivan Cooper	Television film with limited theatrical release
2003	Tractor Tom	Matt (voice)	1 series of animated television series
2003–2007	Murphy's Law	DS Tommy Murphy	5 series of television series (also Creative Consultant, 2005–2007)
2003	The Canterbury Tales	Nick Zakian	1 episode of anthology television series: "The Miller's Tale"
2004	Wall of Silence	Stuart Robe	Television film
2004	Passer By	Joe Keyes	2-part television film
2004	Quite Ugly One Morning	Jack Parlabane	Television film
2005	Big Dippers	Ray	Television film
2007	Jekyll	Tom Jackman/Hyde (Note: Also plays the uncredited roles of Henry Jekyll in Episode 5, and several zombies in Episode 6.)	6-part television serial
2008	Fairy Tales	Professor Hans Michael Prince	1 episode of anthology television series: "Cinderella"
2008	The Passion	Pontius Pilate	4-part television serial
2008	Midnight Man	Max Raban	3-part television serial
2009	Five Minutes of Heaven	Joe Griffin	Television film with limited theatrical release
2009	Occupation	Colour Sergeant Mike Swift	3-part television serial
2010	The Deep	Clem Donnelly	5-part television serial
2011–2012	Monroe	Gabriel Monroe	2 series of television series
2013	James Nesbitt's Ireland	Presenter/Himself	1 series, 8 episodes
2014	Babylon	Commissioner Richard Miller	Pilot, series to resume in 2014.
2014	The Missing	Tony Hughes	1 series, 8 episode
2016–2018	Stan Lee's Lucky Man	DI Harry Clayton	3 series, 28 episodes
2016	The Secret	Colin Howell	1 series, 4 episodes
2018	James Nesbitt: Disasters That Changed Britain	Presenter/Himself	1 series, 6 episodes
2019	British Airways 24/7: Access All Areas	Narrator	1 series, 3 episodes
2021–2022	Bloodlands	DCI Tom Brannick	
2021	Line of Duty	Retired DCI Marcus Thurwell	2 episodes (uncredited)
2021	Stay Close	DS Michael Broome	Netflix original drama
2022	Suspect	Detective Danny Frater	Channel 4 drama
2023	The Heist Before Christmas	Bank Robber	Sky Max film
2024	DNA Journey With Ancestry	Himself	1 episode
2025	Missing You	Calligan	Netflix original drama
2026	Run Away	Simon Greene	Netflix original thriller series
2027	Hercule	TBA	Upcoming six-part series
TBA	Hopley Hall	TBA	Upcoming six-part comedy

=== Film ===
Film acting roles
Year	Title	Role	Description
1986	The End of the World Man	Policeman	Released as "The Bulldozer Brigade" in the US
1991	Hear My Song	Fintan O'Donnell	Based on the life of Josef Locke
1996	Jude	Uncle Joe	Based on "Jude the Obscure" by Thomas Hardy
1997	Welcome to Sarajevo	Gregg	Based on "Natasha's Story" by Michael Nicholson
1997	The James Gang	Graham Armstrong	
1997	Resurrection Man	Ryan	
1997	This Is the Sea	Constable Hubert Porter	Named after "This Is the Sea" a song by "The Waterboys" from their 1985 album "This Is the Sea"
1997	Jumpers	Gerald Clarke	
1998	Waking Ned	"Pig" Finn	Released as "Waking Ned Devine" in the US
1999	Women Talking Dirty	Stanley	
2000	The Most Fertile Man in Ireland	"Mad Dog" Billy Wilson	
2000	Wild About Harry	Walter Adair	
2000	Furry Story	Dad	
2001	Lucky Break	Jimmy Hands	
2004	Millions	Ronnie Cunningham	
2005	Match Point	Detective Banner	
2006	0.0270270 (The Story of a Gambler)	Distraught Man	
2008	Blessed	Peter	
2010	Cherrybomb	Dave	
2010	Outcast	Cathal	
2010	Matching Jack	Connor	
2010	The Way	Jack	
2011	Coriolanus	Sicinius	
2012	The Hobbit: An Unexpected Journey	Bofur	Based on "The Hobbit, or There and Back Again" by J.R.R Tolkien
2013	The Hobbit: The Desolation of Smaug	Bofur	Based on "The Hobbit, or There and Back Again" by J.R.R Tolkien
2014	The Hobbit: The Battle of the Five Armies	Bofur	Based on "The Hobbit, or There and Back Again" by J.R.R Tolkien
2014	Gold	Frank McGunn	
2024	The Unholylands	Himself	Cameo

== Theatre ==
Theatre acting roles
Year	Title	Role	Director	Performance history
1981	Pinocchio	Jiminy Cricket	— (Note: Some information relating to Nesbitt's theatrical career is not held in nationally published works, though may exist in individual theatre company archives or smaller, local publications.)	Riverside Theatre, Coleraine.
1983	The Rocky Horror Show	Brad Majors	Paddy Scully	Arts Theatre, Belfast.
1983	Godspell	Jesus	—	Grand Opera House, Belfast.
1984	Philadelphia Here I Come!	Cast member	—	Arts Theatre, Belfast.
1984	Can't Pay, Won't Pay	Luigi	Michael Poynor	Arts Theatre, Belfast.
1986	West Side Story	Cast member	Michael Poynor	3-month NI tour: Enniskillen, Belfast, Coleraine.
1987	Up on the Roof	Keith	Jane Prowse	Theatre Royal, Plymouth. 1–18 April 1987.; Donmar Warehouse, London, 27 April–16 May 1987.; Apollo Theatre, London, 8 June–22 August 1987.
1989	Up on the Roof	Keith	Jane Prowse	Regional tour. January–March 1989.
1989	As You Like It	Duke Frederick; Duke Senior	Paul Jepson	Rose Theatre Club, Kensington. June 1989.
1989–1990	Hamlet	Guildenstern; Barnardo; Second Gravedigger	Yuri Lyubimov	Haymarket Theatre, Leicester. 19 September–7 October 1989. Old Vic, London, 21 November–3 December 1989. World tour, 1990: His Majesty's Theatre, Perth. 2–3, 5–10 March 1990; Adelaide. March 1990. Tokyo. April 1990.
1991	Translations	Doalty	Gwenda Hughes	Birmingham Repertory Theatre. May–June 1991.
1992	Una Pooka	Aidan	Mark Lambert and Nicolas Kent	Tricycle Theatre. July 1992.
1994	Paddywack	Damien	Michael Latimer	Cockpit Theatre. March 1994. Long Wharf Theatre. October 1994.
1994	Darwin's Flood	Jesus	Simon Stokes	Bush Theatre. May 1994.
2005	After Sun	Jimmy	Josie Rourke	Old Vic, London. 19 June 2005. (Note: 10-minute play.)
2005	Shoot the Crow	Socrates	Robert Delamere	Trafalgar Studios (Studio 1). 11 October–10 December 2005.
2010	The Laws of War	Cast member	Jeremy Herrin	Royal Court Theatre (Downstairs). 16 May 2010. (Note: Gala performance presented by Human Rights Watch.)

== Radio ==
Radio acting and presentation roles
Year	Title	Role	Description
2006	James Nesbitt's World Cup Anthems	Presenter	Radio special
2008	Desert Island Discs	Guest	1 episode: "James Nesbitt"
2010	Staring into the Fridge	Fridge	Afternoon Play
