= Thelma Bates (character) =

- Hex character
- Jemima Rooper as Thelma Bates
- Portrayed by: Jemima Rooper

In-universe information
- Occupation: Ghost

Thelma Bates is a fictional character played by Jemima Rooper in Sky One's British horror dramedy series Hex. She appeared in every episode of the programme. After the departure and subsequent replacement of the programme's lead character of Cassie Hughes (Christina Cole), Thelma became the de facto protagonist as she was the only character who continued the series' narrative.

== Character biography ==
In the beginning of the show's run, Thelma's lesbianism was made very apparent, along with the realization she was in love with her best friend Cassie, with whom she attended Medenham Hall. At Medenham, Thelma was bullied by popular students Roxanne (Amber Sainsbury), Leon (Jamie Davis) and Troy (Joseph Morgan).

In the first episode of the first series, Thelma gave her life to save Cassie's - unwittingly becoming the sacrifice instrumental in returning Azazeal's power. Azazeal staged Thelma's death to appear to be a suicide.

Becoming a ghost, unseen by most characters, Thelma aided Cassie in understanding that she is descended from witches and later helped her new young friend, 500-year-old witch Ella Dee (Laura Pyper), battle against the demonic Nephilim.

Thelma is a unique character in modern television in that for the majority of the series, her interactions were limited to the series' few "supernatural" characters. With the death of Cassie, and their final kiss with both of them as ghosts, it was finally possible for Thelma to pursue relationships with other lesbian ghosts.

== Powers and abilities ==
As a ghost, Thelma displays the ability to enter others' dreams, doing so to make-out with Cassie, later to communicate with the living and to free comrades from Malachi's control.

While invisible to most, she seems to retain complete tangibility, bumping into things, touching everything - even frequently eating crisps. The only exception to this is that she cannot apparently touch anything that is alive.

In one episode we find that Thelma can interact with other time periods, as she is able to save Ella in the past while standing at the same location in the present - seemingly existing in two times at once. cc

== Other plot developments ==
Thelma promises Cassie she will help Ella Dee, a 500-year-old witch and assassin, in her mission. She saves Ella from Azazeal's plots, from servitude to Azazeal and Cassie's son Malachi (Joseph Beattie), and from execution several centuries in the past.

After giving the character Leon (Jamie Davis) a potion of Ella's to allow him to see the spirit world, the three form a group who fight against Malachi - the series' main antagonist in wake of Azazeal's mid-season departure.

In an effort to hinder Thelma's ability to aid Ella, Malachi causes the death of young lesbian Maya Robertson and positions her to develop a ghostly emotional and sexual relationship with Thelma. Maya's spirit bears Malachi's mark, naming her as one of his creatures - a succubus. To weaken Malachi, Ella goes about destroying these creatures, including Maya's spirit, for which she and Thelma temporarily part ways.

Malachi eventually seduces the entire student body romantically or by promising them their greatest desires, creating an army of succubi and incubi that makes him too powerful for Ella to kill. The only students who are not converted are Thelma (because the death of Maya leaves nothing for Malachi to offer her), Roxanne (who becomes a "pure soul" in her quest for forgiveness from God for seducing Jez and causing his apparent suicide), Tom (who is secretly gay, in love with Leon, and impossible to convert because Malachi cannot make the straight Leon love him back), Leon (after Thelma enters his dreams), and Ella (after Thelma enters her dreams to awaken Ella's real, 500-year-old, personality).

In the programme's conclusion, after helping Leon to save Ella's life, an indestructible Malachi sacrifices Roxanne while the entire school is burnt to the ground. Ella, Leon and Thelma escape as Malachi's ritual brings about the End of Days. The series ends unfinished, with the final fate of Thelma left unclear.
