= Let This Be Our Secret =

2011 true-crime book by Deric Henderson

- Author: Deric Henderson
- Language: English
- Genre: Crime, Fact
- Publisher: Gill & Macmillan
- Publication date: 2011
- Publication place: United Kingdom
- Media type: Print Paperback
- Pages: 256 pp
- ISBN: 978-07171-4770-0

Let This Be Our Secret is a true-crime book by award-winning British journalist Deric Henderson about how Colin Howell, aided and abetted by his mistress and fellow-Christian Hazel Buchanan (later remarried, Hazel Stewart at 2011 trial), callously killed their spouses and buried the truth for 18 years by making the deaths look like a suicide pact.

== Background ==
The pair, one the wife of a dentist the other an officer of the Royal Ulster Constabulary (R.U.C.), died in what was then believed to be a suicide pact, although they were not lovers.

The body of nurse Lesley Howell, 30, wearing Walkman earphones and clutching photos of her four children, lay on the back seat of a car. Constable Trevor Buchanan, 31, who was originally from near Omagh, lay dead in the front seat. The car was filled with exhaust fumes inside the garage of a house in the seaside town of Castlerock, County Londonderry, in Ulster in May 1991. An inquest heard that no crime was suspected, and returned verdicts of suicide.

== Howell's secret ==
Eighteen years later, in 2009, Howell's husband Colin Howell, 50, a dental implant specialist, church-goer and born-again Christian, contacted police. Colin Howell revealed that the two were murdered by their respective spouses at the time: himself and Sunday school teacher Hazel Buchanan (later, Stewart) who were in fact, lovers. Their relationship continued secretly for five years after the murders, and both later remarried.

Deric Henderson's 2011 book tells the story of dentist Howell and his lover Buchanan with coverage of both trials and interviews of family members among others. Henderson said that he conducted more than 50 interviews for the book and incorporated material that emerged during Stewart's trial. It includes the fact that, in December 2010, having pleaded guilty to the two murders the previous month, Howell was sentenced to life imprisonment, with a minimum 21-year jail term before possibility of release. It also addresses that, four months after Howell's sentencing, in March 2011, the remarried/renamed Hazel Stewart was found guilty at trial of the two murders and sentenced to life imprisonment with a minimum term of 18 years.

A publication summary reads:

A series of disasters in Howell's life – the death of his eldest son, massive losses in an investment scam and the revelation that he has been sexually assaulting female patients – lead to him declaring that he is a fraud and a godless man. He tells the elders of his Church that he and Hazel Stewart conspired together to murder their spouses nearly two decades earlier.

== TV series ==
Henderson's account became a 2016 TV miniseries titled The Secret, starring James Nesbitt as Colin Howell, with Genevieve O'Reilly as Hazel Buchanan, Laura Pyper as Lesley Howell, and Jason Watkins as Pastor John Hansford. The Secret is written by Stuart Urban, directed by Nick Murphy, and produced by Jonathan Curling; the executive producers are Hat Trick Productions' Mark Redhead and Stuart Urban.
