= Mark Pegg =

Mark Pegg may refer to:

- Mark Pegg (actor) (born 1969), British actor and film producer
- Mark Gregory Pegg (born 1963), Australian professor of medieval history
