= Demons (TV series) =

2009 British television series

- Genre: Supernatural drama Horror Action
- Created by: Johnny Capps; Julian Murphy
- Written by: Peter Tabern; Howard Overman; Lucy Watkins
- Starring: Philip Glenister; Christian Cooke; Holliday Grainger; Zoë Tapper; Saskia Wickham
- Opening theme: Starlight Mints – Eyes of the Night
- Composer: Jack C Arnold
- Country of origin: United Kingdom
- Original language: English
- No. of episodes: 6

Production
- Running time: 44 mins (exc. adverts)
- Production company: Shine TV

Original release
- Network: ITV
- Release: 3 January – 7 February 2009

Demons is a British six-part supernatural drama television series produced by Shine TV, which premiered on ITV on 3 January 2009. It was produced by the same company that made the Sky One supernatural drama Hex and the BBC One fantasy series Merlin. The DVD of the only series made was released on 6 April 2009.

== Plot ==
The plot follows the adventures of a London teenager Luke Rutherford, who learns that he is the last descendant of the Van Helsing line by the sudden arrival of his American godfather Rupert Galvin. Luke is charged with the role of smiting the gathering dark forces of the world whilst trying to live an ordinary life of exams and parties. Rupert Galvin helps train Luke with the assistance of Mina Harker, a blind vampiric concert pianist and authority on half-lives (i.e., vampires, demons, zombies, and werewolves). Luke's best friend Ruby also joins in on the action.

== Cast and characters ==
- Philip Glenister as Rupert Galvin: An American demon hunter with a sarcastic sense of humour, Rupert is Luke's godfather. His close friend was Luke's late father, whose death Rupert may have been partly responsible for. Rupert appears ruthless and cold-blooded, driven by a fanatical hatred of demons after one murdered his wife. But he is a warm-hearted individual who cares about his friends and looks upon Luke as a son. He drinks too much to drown his sorrows.
- Christian Cooke as Luke Rutherford: The main protagonist, Luke is a student who is nearing graduation when he meets his godfather, Rupert, who informs Luke that he is a descendant of Van Helsing and it is his destiny to save the world from demons. Due to this bloodline he has above average speed, strength, and skill at martial arts. Luke is reluctant to fight the demons but does so out of duty, though he often complains that he would rather be attending social functions with his friends. Luke appears to have a nihilistic outlook on life, but cares greatly about his best friend Ruby despite sometimes appearing indifferent toward her.
- Holliday Grainger as Ruby: Ruby has been Luke's best friend since childhood. She is also in love with Luke, but is afraid to admit this. She has a rivalry with Mina and insists on accompanying the group in fighting demons. Her intelligence and resourcefulness often prove a great help to Luke, Rupert, and Mina, though they often overlook her.
- Zoë Tapper as Mina Harker: A beautiful but haughty blind woman, Mina has fought Half-Lives with Rupert and Luke's father. She is the same Mina Harker who appears in Bram Stoker's Dracula, having lived over a hundred years due to her vampire blood. She curbs her vampiric tendencies through dialysis. Mina has a psychometric sixth sense that allows her to touch objects and see their history. She treats Ruby like an annoying child. It is suggested that her blindness is a result of the measures she takes to suppress her vampiric tendencies as she is shown being able to move attack after drinking some of her own blood.
- Saskia Wickham as Jenny Rutherford: Luke's mother fears that he is becoming like his father: vague and always disappearing without telling her why.

=== Notable demons ===
- Gladiolus Thrip (Mackenzie Crook): A preening, narcissistic and ruthless hit-man, Thrip is a Type 12 entity, the most powerful type of demon there is. He has a cockney accent and speaks in a very pompous, verbose manner. He possesses superhuman speed and strength and is immune to most forms of attack. Nevertheless, he possesses an arrogant belief in his invincibility which leads to his apparent destruction at the hands of Luke in the first episode. Thrip had no nose and wore an ivory beak in its place which survived the apparent destruction of his body. He later returns in the final episode, working to drive Luke and Galvin apart; however he is ultimately killed by Mina, who awakens her vampiric nature by drinking a vial of her own blood. Thanks to her vampiric sense, Mina realises that Thrip is a vampire (explaining why he did not die previously and why he was so difficult to kill). She later tears out his throat, as the only one who can kill a vampire is another vampire, causing his body to liquefy. Thrip's superhuman speed was a clue to his true nature, as vampires bear the same kind of superhuman speed as seen in 'Suckers'.
- Gilgamel (Rick English): An ancient and powerful demon with an affinity for graveyards and churches, Gilgamel is a Travesty, a demon that can impersonate an angel. He feeds on the lifeforce of children who become his slaves after he devours their souls and help lure others into Gilgamel's clutches. While hunting for fresh victims, he appears as an ethereal white light; however his true form is that of a hideous, gargoyle-like demon, complete with cloven hooves, taloned wings and a skull resembling a Romanesque helmet. Luke easily kills him with a sword belonging to St Anselm (who had previously tried- and failed- to kill Gilgamel).
- Tobias Tibbs (Kevin McNally): A psychopathic genius, part man, part rat. Tibbs is the demon responsible for the death of Rupert Galvin's wife and so Rupert hates him most of all demons and will stop at nothing to kill him. Tibbs however does not appear to be remotely afraid of Galvin and enjoys taunting him over the death of his wife.
- Quincey (Ciarán McMenamin): A power-hungry vampire and the son of Mina and her husband Jonathan, Quincey views humans as an inferior species and thus believes that vampires are perfectly justified in hunting and killing them, viewing it as no more evil than humans killing and eating chickens. He wants Mina to join him because she possesses the blood of Dracula, the most powerful vampire who ever lived, with which he seeks to make himself invincible so that he can conquer the earth. Mina is reluctant to let him die, but he is eventually killed by Luke. Like Mina, Quincey was a character in Bram Stoker's Dracula, being mentioned at the end of the novel and named after another character called Quincey Morris.
- Alice (Laura Aikman): A 3,000-year-old harpy with a taste for human flesh and a predilection for preying on young men, Alice stalks her prey by taking the form of a beautiful young woman, which she uses to hunt Luke by posing as his girlfriend. When she so desires (or if forced by an external stimulus), she takes a more bestial form, becoming a winged beast that appears and behaves more like a dragon than the harpy of classical legend. She desires to kill Luke as revenge for one of his ancestors murdering her sisters, but Luke grudgingly kills her after learning her true nature.

== Episodes ==
No.	Title	Directed by	Written by	Original release date	UK viewers (millions)
1	"They Bite"	Tom Harper	Peter Tabern	3 January 2009	6.27
Luke Rutherford is an average teenager – until his dead father's best friend, Rupert Galvin, enters his life, and a small hideous creature attacks him. Galvin has come to tell Luke that he is the great-grandson of the legendary Abraham Van Helsing. Luke's destiny is to fight against the supernatural entities swarming the earth after he fights a small demon. But half-life Gladiolus Thrip (Mackenzie Crook) has discovered Luke's secret as well. He kidnaps Ruby, imprisoning her in a tomb and gagging her with duct tape, before his apparent destruction. Guest appearances: Mackenzie Crook, Thomas Arnold, Cloudia Swann
2	"The Whole Enchilada"	Tom Harper	Peter Tabern	10 January 2009	5.58
Galvin thinks that a girl's disappearance is down to the ancient demon, Gilgamel, a fear confirmed by the priest Father Simeon (Richard Wilson). Gilgamel feasts on innocent souls, whilst masquerading as an angel. As more and more children disappear at the hands of the demon, which is impersonating the first girl who was taken, including Ruby's younger brother, Galvin and Luke decide to summon the demon in order to defeat it. Using a magic sword he defeats the demon just before it feasts. Guest appearances: Richard Wilson, Tyler Anthony
3	"Saving Grace"	Matthew Evans	Lucy Watkins	17 January 2009	4.81
The return of Galvin's wife's murderer, Tobias Tibbs (Kevin McNally), a half-life who likes to experiment on humans, sets the vampire hunter on a path of vengeance. This leads to Galvin breaking into Tibbs' lair and having to be rescued from a group of half-lives. Thirst for revenge still not quenched, he and Luke find themselves walking into a trap. Ruby finds herself in a race against time to defuse a bomb placed in the Stacks by Tibbs due to a woman he was experimenting on letting him into the Vault, and with the help of Mina, must find Luke and Galvin before they succumb to a watery fate. Guest appearances: Kevin McNally, Laura Pyper, Calvin Dean (II)
4	"Suckers"	Tom Harper	Lucy Watkins	24 January 2009	4.22
Bad boy vampire Quincey (Ciarán McMenamin) is on the scene and causing havoc around London with his band of half-life misfits. Galvin and Luke must stop him, but there is more to Quincey than meets the eye. Luke discovers that Mina is a vampire, and that Quincey is in fact her own son, who she made a vampire to cure him of a deadly disease in the 1800s. Finally she drinks blood, enabling her to briefly see and kill Quincey. Guest appearances: Ciarán McMenamin, Katrine de Candole, Peter G Reed, Eileen Essell
5	"Smitten"	Matthew Evans	Howard Overman	31 January 2009	4.04
A strange murder in the capital raises fears for Luke's safety, providing him with the opportunity to lie low and taste the life of an ordinary teenager. However, alarm bells ring when Galvin and Ruby suspect the adolescent's new love interest is an entity that can take the form of a female to stalk its prey, and she wants revenge for the death of her two sisters. Luke refuses to believe them, and tells Galvin that he should not let his feelings waiver his judgement just because his wife was killed by a half-life. However, the tables turn and Luke spots Alice hiding a body in her apartment. Confronting her as well as Galvin and the rest of the team, they defeat the harpy. Guest appearances: Laura Aikman, Sara Stewart, Michael Walter
6	"Nothing Like Nebraska"	Matthew Evans	Peter Tabern	7 February 2009	3.42 (overnight)
Luke becomes haunted by dreams about the car crash that killed his father and Galvin's connection to it. A visit to a psychic convinces him his godfather is not the man he seems and, with Gladiolus Thrip back on the scene and showing an unhealthy interest in Luke's past, even giving him a gun, the vampire-fighting duo look set to be torn apart. Finally it is revealed that Luke's father was going to hand him over to the half-lives after he began to sympathise with them, but the car crash stopped him just as he was driving to meet them. Mina again drinks blood, increasing her speed and giving her her eyesight, she reveals Thrip is a vampire and kills him. Guest appearances: Mackenzie Crook, Richard Wilson, Pauline McLynn, Thomas Arnold

== Reception ==
Demons debuted on ITV with 6.27 million viewers. Episode 1 received mixed reviews. Andrew Billen gave the show 4 stars in The Times stating that whilst it had similarities with other previous TV series, the producers "certainly know how to steal with panache." Sarah Dempster wrote in The Guardian that "The action is snappy and Philip Glenister (as ace vampire smiter Rupert Galvin) sizzles like a hot steak in his Milk Tray turtleneck, but this is thin soup for an audience weaned on the otherworldly warmth of Doctor Who and Buffy the Vampire Slayer" Charlie Brooker described the premiere episode as "a string of cutscenes from a quirky gothic videogame", stating that he was, "genuinely not sure if ITV are wheeling it out as a hit or sneaking it out as a clunker." Meanwhile, Kim Newman wrote in The Times that: "Demons is a show I'd really like to like, but it needs to free itself from the templates it's adopted to develop its own personality. The elements that intrigue all come from Stoker's still-influential novel, while the encrustations derive from more recent glosses on the great Van Helsing tradition." Kevin O'Sullivan gave Demons a more positive review describing it as, "diabolically daft...and wonderfully watchable." The second episode saw a drop in the viewing figures, achieving 5.58 million, and ratings continued to fall, plunging to 4.22 for the fourth episode and 4.04 for the fifth.

Philip Glenister's American accent has raised questions as to why he chose that voice for the series, with speculation forming that it was to distance himself from his Life on Mars and Ashes to Ashes character, Gene Hunt. Speaking at the Ashes to Ashes press launch Glenister said that: "[Rupert] was written as a Texan originally and I thought bollocks to that – I'm not playing a Texan. They said I could play him as English, but I wanted to have the challenge of playing an American."

Demons premiered in the United States on 2 January 2010, on BBC America, airing at 9:00 pm ET/PT.

On 19 June 2009 ITV confirmed it would not be making a second series of Demons.

== See also ==
- List of vampire television series
