= Mark Pegg (actor) =

British actor and film producer

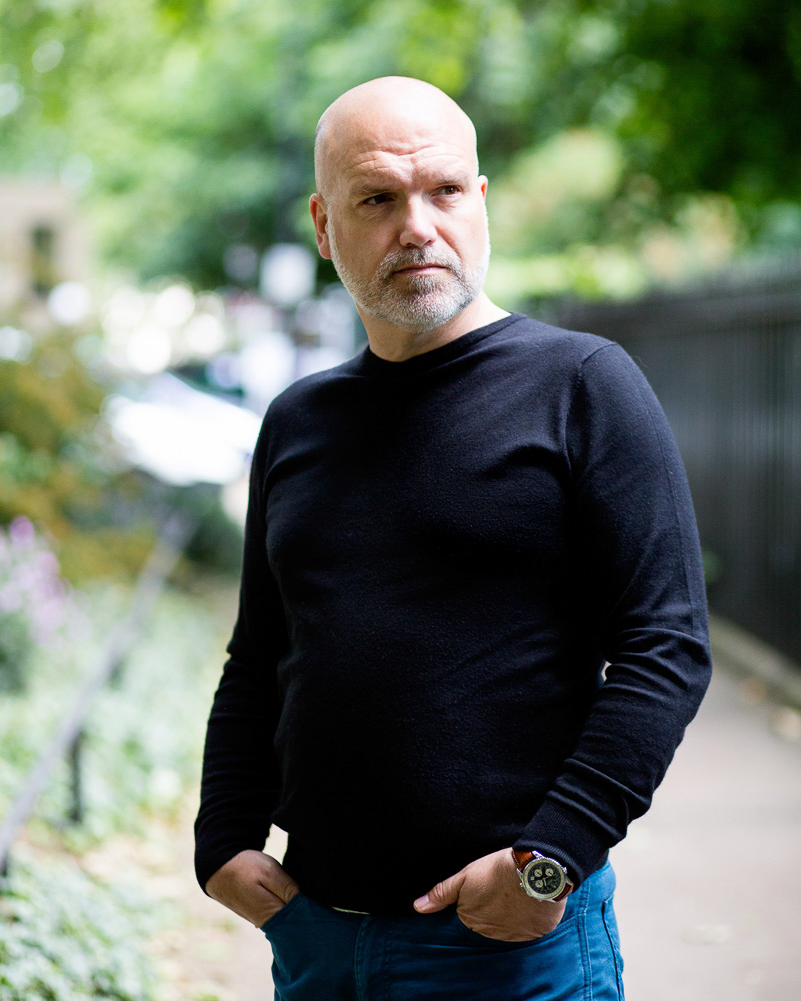
- English actor Mark Pegg
- Occupations: Actor; Film producer

Mark Pegg is a British actor and film producer.

He first came to prominence as Detective Constable Tony Weir in the BBC production Our Friends in the North and has since appeared in many television and stage productions, including Frank Hauser's Chichester Festival Theatre's 1995 production of Hobson's Choice with Leo McKern. He trained at the Academy of Live and Recorded Arts in London.

In 2006, he produced the feature film Heroes and Villains which starred James Corden and Jenny Agutter, and in 2007 he was the Executive Producer on Stuart Urban's Tovarisch, I Am Not Dead.

As of September 2012, he was developing a number of film scripts at

Mark is the patron of the Love Inspire Foundation.

In 2019, he opened an online acting school to enable students to study acting without the expense of attending drama school.

== Early life ==
Pegg grew up in Walthamstow, London.

At the age of 11 was Capital Radio's "Junior Disc Jockey" on the Sunday morning Kids' Show "Hullabaloo".

Around this time the actress Louise Jameson (who was appearing as Leela in Doctor Who) ran a drama workshop at Pegg's school "I had so much fun and it made me realise that I wanted to be an actor. Fifteen years later, I was working with her in EastEnders".

== Filmography ==
=== Film ===
Year	Title	Role	Notes
2006	Heroes and Villains	Producer	Cameo Appearance as Paying Man
2007	Tovarisch, I Am Not Dead	Executive producer	
2016	Dream On	Producer	

=== Television ===
Year	Title	Role	Notes
2001	Bad Girls	Prison Officer MacFarlane	
2000	Starhunter	Alistair McNaughton	Episode: "Trust"
2000	The 10th Kingdom	Metal Merchant	
2000	Where There's Smoke	Rob Dirkin	TV movie
1999	The Alchemists	Steve	TV movie
1999	The Waiting Time	Sergeant Hanson	TV movie
1993 - 1999	The Bill	Eric Ransome	
1993	Kavanagh QC	Eric Rhodes	Episode: "End Game"
1997 - 1998	EastEnders	Alfie Kane	
1996	Our Friends in the North	Tony Weir	Episodes: "1966" & "1967"
1994	Class Act	Pugman	
1996	Call Red	Police Partner	1 episode
