= The Secret (TV series) =

2016 Northern Irish TV miniseries

- Genre: True-life drama
- Based on: Let This Be Our Secret
- Written by: Stuart Urban
- Directed by: Nick Murphy
- Starring: James Nesbitt; Genevieve O'Reilly; Laura Pyper; Glen Wallace; Jason Watkins
- Theme music composer: Andrew Simon McAllister
- Composer: Andrew Simon McAllister
- Country of origin: Northern Ireland
- Original language: English
- No. of series: 1
- No. of episodes: 4

Production
- Executive producers: Mark Redhead; Stuart Urban
- Producer: Jonathan Curling
- Running time: 51 minutes (including adverts)
- Production company: Hat Trick Productions

Original release
- Network: ITV
- Release: 29 April – 20 May 2016

The Secret is a 2016 Northern Irish ITV mini-series based on Let This Be Our Secret, Belfast journalist Deric Henderson's account of the double murder of Lesley Howell and Constable Trevor Buchanan, whose bodies were discovered in a fume-filled car in the garage of a property in Castlerock, County Londonderry, in Northern Ireland in May 1991.

The drama stars James Nesbitt as killer dentist Colin Howell, is written by BAFTA-winning writer Stuart Urban and is directed by Nick Murphy. The producer is Jonathan Curling, and the executive producers are Hat Trick Productions' Mark Redhead and Stuart Urban.

It was broadcast from 29 April to 20 May 2016 in four episodes.

== Cast ==
- James Nesbitt as Colin Howell
- Genevieve O'Reilly as Hazel Buchanan
- Laura Pyper as Lesley Howell
- Glen Wallace as Trevor Buchanan
- Jason Watkins as Pastor John Hansford
- Jonathan Harden as DC Devine
- David Pearse as Andy Comerford
- Ali White as Hilary McAuley
- Riley Hamilton as Matthew Howell
- Nina Woods as Lauren Howell
- Murray Speers as Daniel Howell
- Jack Erdis as Andrew Buchanan
- Sophie Mellotte as Lisa Buchanan
- Patrick O'Kane as Victor Buchanan

== Plot ==
=== Episode 1 ===
In 1990, married dentist Colin meets married teacher Hazel, and they start having an affair. Colin assures her their love is a gift from God, and he wants them to act on it.

=== Episode 2 ===
Lesley (Colin's wife) receives an inheritance from her father. Colin asphyxiates Lesley and Hazel's husband Trevor whilst they sleep. He then stages a suicide pact.

=== Episode 3 ===
The coroner gives a verdict of suicide. Hazel and Colin continue their relationship, but Hazel feels guilty and can only have sex with Colin whilst heavily drugged. Eventually the relationship ends and they marry new partners. Colin's son Matthew dies. Colin concludes this is a punishment by God.

=== Episode 4 ===
Colin loses a fortune in a scam, and confesses to the murders. He and Hazel are both imprisoned.

== Howell family reaction ==
The production was criticised by Howell's daughter, Lauren Bradford, for condensing Lesley Howell's plotline to "a down-trodden housewife", missing "her ambition and drive, her wicked sense of humour, her thoughtfulness and warmth", while "exploiting a tragedy" that was very real – not "just a story" to the victim's family.

== Accolades and awards ==
The drama was nominated for the BAFTA award for Best Mini-Series, which went to National Treasure.

It won the Royal Television Society award for Best Drama, Northern Ireland. It was nominated at The Broadcast Awards as Best Drama.
