= Azazeal =

Fictional character

- Hex character
- Michael Fassbender as Azazeal from Sky One's Hex.
- Portrayed by: Michael Fassbender

In-universe information
- Species: Nephilim
- Gender: Male
- Children: Malachi

Azazeal (pronounced "ahz-azeel") is a fictional character in the British television series Hex, played by Michael Fassbender.

The character is seemingly based on the similarly spelled Azazel from The Book of Enoch. However, past the name, the similarities end. In biblical Apocrypha, the fallen angels referred to in Hex as the Nephilim were in fact called the Grigori, or "Watchers." In the Apocrypha, the Nephilim were offspring of the Grigori by mortal women. It is most likely the difference in spelling of Azazeal/Azazel and the change to Nephilim from Grigori were done for aesthetic reasons, though this has not been officially confirmed.

Azazeal seduced a series of women throughout the ages, dating from ancient Egypt to the present, but these women were usually killed by Ella Dee in order to stop the freedom of the Nephilim that his son's birth would signal.

In the second episode of Hex, Azazeal sacrifices Cassie Hughes' friend and roommate Thelma Bates, turning her into a ghost and releasing his power. Later in the series, he enters into a sexual relationship with Cassie and Cassie's teacher Jo, eventually turning her to his side. Through a series of demonic possessions, he conceives an heir, Malachi, with Cassie, and convinces the abortionist to put the child in his care at Christmas time.

In series two, after Cassie's death, Azazeal uses the mystical Stone of Belial to make Ella Dee relive her torture and execution, eventually causing her to lose her immortality and rapidly age to 500 or so years old, nearing death. He, an adult Malachi and Perie the "fairy" form a small alliance, before Azazeal is suddenly notified by higher powers that he is no longer to be Malachi's caregiver, replaced with Mephistopheles. He and Ella share a goodbye without trying to kill each other.

== See also ==
- Hex (TV series)
