= Punk Rock (play) =

British play by Simon Stephens (2009)

- Original language: English
- Written by: Simon Stephens
- Characters: William Carlisle; Lilly Cahill; Bennett Francis; Cissy Franks; Nicholas Chatman; Tanya Gleason; Chadwick Meade; Lucy Francis; Dr Richard Harvey

Premiere
- Date: 2009; Royal Exchange Theatre
- Place: England

Punk Rock is a play by the British playwright Simon Stephens which premiered at the Royal Exchange in Manchester, England, in 2009 and transferred to the Lyric Hammersmith directed by Sarah Frankcom. The play concerns a group of private school sixth formers during their A Level mocks exams.

== Plot ==
In the library of a grammar school, eight sixth-formers are preparing for their mock-A Levels and nearing the end of their school lives. There are various sub-plots detailing the various love lines or triangles that emerge through the play.

== Characters ==
Character	Original Cast, 2009	Revival Cast, 2010	Welsh Cast, 2012	New Zealand Cast, 2012	Australian Cast, 2012	Australian Cast, 2014	Spanish Cast, 2014	New York Cast, 2014	New Zealand Cast, 2015	Edinburgh Cast, 2015	Montreal Cast, 2016	Spanish National Tour Cast, 2017	New Zealand Cast, 2017	French Cast, 2019	Australian Cast, 2019
William Carlisle	Tom Sturridge	Rupert Simonian	Samuel Harris	Nathan Mudge	Sam O'Sullivan	Andrew Creer	Víctor de la Fuente	Douglas Smith	Jared Kirkwood	Oliver Matjasz	Oliver Price	Jesús Lavi / Víctor de la Fuente	Shauwn Keil	Maël Galland	Ben Walter
Bennett Francis	Henry Lloyd-Hughes	Edward Franklin	Christopher Harris	Jordan Mooney	Graeme McRae	Bevan Pfeiffer	Samy Khalil	Will Pullen	Taylor Barrett	Stefan Collins	Nicholas Lepage	Juan Frendsa	Mila Fati	Romain Tarnaud	Karl Richmond
Chadwick Meade	Harry McEntire	Mike Nobel	John Clark	Ryan Dulieu	Gabriel Dean Fancourt	Dacre Montgomery-Harvey	Álvaro Quintana	Noah Robbins	Hamish Annan	Lewis Norton	Patrick Park	Fernando Sainz de la Maza	Kasey Benge	Charles Peccia Galletto	Laurence Boxhall
Lilly Cahill	Jessica Raine	Laura Pyper	Leah Carroll	Sarah Graham	Darcie Irwin-Simpson	Jessica Paterson	María Romero	Colby Minifie	Ripeka Templeton	Jane Hogan	Rebecca Bauer	Cristina Gallego	Molly Weaver	Clara Courty Zanca	Zoe Hawkins
Cissy Franks	Sophie Wu	Ruth Milne	Jeni Lloyd	Morgan Albrecht	Madeleine Jones	Stephanie Panozzo	Carolina Yuste	Lilly Englert	Ailis Oliver-Kerby	Debbie Ashley	Madeline Harvey	Cristina Bertol / Ana Escriu	Alexandra Taylor	Manon Nobili	Ruby Duncan
Nicholas Chatman	Nicholas Banks	Nicholas Banks	Kemario Ellington	George Mason	Owen Little	Luke Fewster	Alejandro Chaparro	Pico Alexander	Andrew Coshan	Elliot Gardner	Ryan Doherty	Axel Novo / Jota Haya	Maia Diamond (Nichola Chatman)	Marc Derville	Flynn Smeaton
Tanya Gleason	Katie West	Katie West	Rebecca Ormrod	Elizabeth McMenamin	Rebecca Martin	Harriet Gordon-Anderson	Helena Mocejón	Annie Funke	Lana Walters	Josie Webster	Victoria Hall	Katia Borlado	Ashleigh Low	Jehanne Pollosson	Annie Shapero
Lucy Francis	Emma Warbuton	Juliet York	Emily Dyble	Rosie Hayden / Caitlin Roscherr / Jaimee McCann	Clementine Mills	Elle Harris	-	Sophie Shapiro	Sinead Fitzgerald	Claire Elkins	Annabella Papaioannou/Megan Roche	-	Aishani Pole	-	Natalia Saavedra-Ingram & Pippa Asome
Dr Richard Harvey	Simon Wolfe	Simon Wolfe	Liz Tustin (Dr Rachel Harvey)	Devlin Bishop	Paul Hooper	David J Rose	Ariadna Gil, Chani Martín, Eugenio Villota	David Greenspan	Ross Johnston	Chris Green	Saro Saroyan	Tana Payno	Annie Ruth (Dr Judith Harvey)	-	Jessica Clarke

== Other productions ==
- The Australian premiere was on 27 July 2012 performed by pantsguys Productions in association with the Australian Theatre for Young People
- A production of the play was done at the Oxford Playhouse.
- The New Zealand premiere was performed by The Outfit Theatre Company at The Basement Theatre in Auckland from 27 March to 7 April.
- The Welsh premiere of the play was performed at the Arad Goch theatre in Aberystwyth on 18 and 19 May 2012, directed by Rhodri Brady.
- The play made its New York premiere on 29 October 2014 in an MCC Theater production at the Lucille Lortel Theatre. The production was selected as a New York Times Critic's Pick, and earned Lucille Lortel Award nominations for Will Pullen (Outstanding Featured Actor in a Play, for his turn as Bennett Francis) and Japhy Weideman (Outstanding Lighting Design).
- The play made its Edinburgh Fringe return on 24 August 2015 by Theatre Company 'The Pigeon Collective'. The production received a five star review from 'Broadway Baby' and made it into the Top Rated Shows of 2015 at Edinburgh Fringe Punk Rock by Simon Stephens: 5 star review by Bennett Bonci
- The Fortune Theatre (Dunedin, New Zealand) produced this play, opening 27 June 2015, directed by Lara Macgregor.
- The French company Summer Lemonade produced punk rock at Avignon festival in 2019, directed by Marc Derville. It was the first time a Simon Stephens play was produced in Avignon.
- Patalog Theatre Co. premiered the play in Melbourne for the first time professionally at fortyfivedownstairs in December 2019. The play received wide critical acclaim with critics calling it "A masterful re-working. Unmissable.".

== Reception ==
The premiere received generally positive reviews with Variety saying "confirms Simon Stephens as one of the most important and exciting British playwrights working today". The play was nominated for the 2010 TMA Best New Play award. It was also well received by The Guardian, the Crikey blog, The Times and others.

Some critics have criticised Stephens for unoriginality, however. For example, Leo Benedictus, writing for The Guardian in 2009, said "The critics spot various possible influences such as The History Boys, Another Country, Lord of the Flies, Elephant, If…, Skins, and The Catcher in the Rye."

== Legacy ==
=== Identity Crisis ===
Punk Rock inspired Identity Crisis, a drama and philosophy project, exploring the play's themes with young people in London and Manchester.

=== Teaching ===
Punk Rock is frequently used in Drama education in sixth form and sometimes at GCSE level in England, as well as a few other places around the world. There have been multiple student productions of the play, some of which the play's author, Simon Stephens, has attended.
