= Stuart Urban =

British screenwriter and director

- Born: 11 September 1958 (age 67); Newport, Isle of Wight, UK
- Occupations: Film director, film producer, screenwriter
- Website: stuarturban.com

Stuart Urban (born 1958) is a British film and television director.

== Early life and education ==
Stuart Urban, whose younger brother is the journalist Mark Urban, was educated at Rokeby Preparatory School, Kingston upon Thames and King's College School, Wimbledon. He later attended Balliol College, Oxford, graduating with a first class degree in Modern History.

At the age of 13, he became the youngest director to have a film shown at the Cannes Film Festival. The 30-minute film, a short feature called The Virus of War, was later shown on television in various countries.

== Career ==
Urban began writing and directing full-time in the early 1980s, working on television drama series including Bergerac for the BBC. In 1992, his one-off television film An Ungentlemanly Act, a dramatisation of the first 36 hours of the Falklands War featured Ian Richardson and Bob Peck. The production won the British Academy Television Award for Best Single Drama in 1993.

In 1993, Urban set up his own independent production company, Cyclops Vision, which has produced the majority of his work ever since. He was also one of the directors of the acclaimed and award-winning 1996 BBC drama serial Our Friends in the North, although he left the production early after disagreements with writer Peter Flannery, and one of his episodes was entirely re-shot by another director, though not before being entirely re-written by Peter Flannery – a fact generally withheld from public knowledge at the time.

Urban went on to write, produce and direct the feature films Preaching to the Perverted (1997) and Revelation (2001), both produced by Cyclops Vision and released around the world. In 2015, the former was listed by The Guardian as one of the top 10 films about BDSM and fetish subject matter. His documentary film work includes the first polemical film against Western interventions, Against the War (BBC, Cyclops Vision; 1999) co-written with Harold Pinter, who also presented.

In 2006, Urban completed Tovarisch, I Am Not Dead, his full-length documentary film about his father Garri, a Jewish physician from Ukraine who escaped from both the Gulag and the Holocaust. It was released to UK cinemas in 2008, earning a number of nominations and awards, including a nomination at the British Independent Film Awards and Grierson Awards. In 2011 Urban wrote, produced and directed May I Kill U?, a black comedy feature film starring Kevin Bishop, Frances Barber and Rosemary Leach. The plot follows a cycling vigilante who starts a lethal campaign in the 2011 England riots: "a psychopath on the cycle path". The film was released in 2013 after premiering at FrightFest in 2012.

In 2014, Urban optioned Deric Henderson's non-fiction book, Let This Be Our Secret, which he adapted as screenwriter and executive produced for Hat Trick Productions and ITV. A four-hour drama, starring James Nesbitt as double murderer Colin Howell, it was filmed in Northern Ireland in late 2015 under the title The Secret and began transmission on 29 April 2016. Urban was nominated for a BAFTA for The Secret in the category of Best Miniseries, for the Broadcast Awards (Best Drama); it also won the Royal Television Society Northern Ireland Awards as Best Drama.

== Personal life ==
Urban is a member of Wimbledon Synagogue. He and his wife Dana live in south-west London and have two children.

== Sources ==
- The Secret nominated at Broadcast Awards 2017
- The Secret Wins Best Drama N Ireland, Royal Television Society Awards
