= May I Kill U? =

2012 British black comedy film

- Directed by: Stuart Urban
- Written by: Stuart Urban
- Produced by: Stuart Urban; Alan Jay; Rosa Russo (co-producer); Mark Vennis (executive producer); Gary Phillips (executive producer); Danica Bezanov (associate producer); Carleen Beadle (line producer)
- Starring: Kevin Bishop; Jack Doolan; Frances Barber; Hayley-Marie Axe; Kasia Koleczek; Rosemary Leach; Ali Craig; Rachael Evelyn; Israel Oba; Jessica Jackson-Smith; Margarita Nazarenko; Kimberley Drew; Bethen Thorpe
- Cinematography: Fernando Ruiz
- Edited by: Christopher C.F. Chow; Fernando Ruiz
- Music by: Haim Frank Ilfman
- Production companies: Vectis Vision; Cyclops Vision; MIKU
- Distributed by: Indie Rights (worldwide); Devolver Digital Films (worldwide); Eureka Video (United Kingdom); Fresh View Cinemas (Zambia); Russian Report (Eastern Bloc countries)
- Release date: 25 August 2012 (FrightFest)
- Country: United Kingdom
- Language: English

May I Kill U? is a 2012 British black comedy film directed by Stuart Urban. A horror-edged satire of British right-wing politics and the idea of a Broken Britain, the film follows a police constable and rogue vigilante cyclist (played by comedian Kevin Bishop) who gains social media fame serial killing "scumbags" and posting the videos on YouTube and Twitter. It debuted at the FrightFest film festival in 2012. It was theatrically released in the UK in 2013 (Note: In the US, the film's theatrical release was limited and occurred in 2014.), and received overwhelmingly negative reviews from critics.

== Critical reception ==
May I Kill U? received largely scathing reviews from critics, with only a small number of less negative reviews. The film holds a 13% approval rating on Rotten Tomatoes and a 7 out of 100 score (indicating "Overwhelming dislike") on Metacritic.

=== UK ===
Reviews from British critics were overwhelmingly negative. The Guardian's film critic Peter Bradshaw described May I Kill U? as "one of those British indie films that come nowhere near the standard of the most ordinary telly drama." A separate Guardian review from Philip French was one of the film's only positive reviews, describing the film as "funny, sharp and ruthless." Empire stated: "Setting out to be a killer-cop satire for the social media age, the result makes Paul Blart look like Taxi Driver. Unfollow immediately." Total Film described May I Kill U? as "a satire so blunt it makes an early - but compelling - case for most misguided film of 2013." The List opined that "There's little actual humour in May I Kill U?, just a grim view of police-work, deprivation, social media and modern life generally." The Daily Telegraph stated that "There may well be a worse film released this year than this unwatchable British black comedy, although it sets a terrifyingly low benchmark." The Daily Express described the film as "a tacky, low-budget film that is as blunt and obvious as the instruments Baz uses on his victims." The Evening Standard stated that "The joke barely lasts the film’s short running time, but that is mitigated by performances from Bishop, Frances Barber as his slovenly mum and Rosemary Leach as an old lady who beats him at his own game." Little White Lies described the film as "A spoof of right-wing reactionary politics that feels better suited to television than cinema" and stated: "At times, it feels like a relative of superlative Belgian serial killer comedy, Man Bites Dog, though a rather toothless distant cousin. Urban’s film trades in absurdist humour and knowing clichés but never ventures into the darker territory the material is calling out for. May I Kill U? looks very much like it was made for Channel 4 as post-pub fodder." Metro called the film "a flat-footed satire of the London riots". Contactmusic.com awarded the film 3 stars out of 5, stating: "A pitch-black sense of humour provides some strong laughs in this satirical British thriller, but the undercooked script never manages to hold onto our interest. Packed with coincidences and contrivances, the story is just too sloppy, even if there's a provocative point worth making in here somewhere." On Kermode and Mayo's Film Review, BBC film critic Mark Kermode called the film "one of the most ill-judged films of recent memory". Starburst gave the film one of its few positive reviews, saying "May I Kill U? is not at all what you might expect it to be. It’s witty, snappily directed, surprisingly dark and unexpectedly sad at times. This very English Bad Lieutenant is a Trending Topic U really should keep your eye on."

=== Internationally ===
International critics were generally no more forgiving. The Village Voice stated that "Urban's stab at black-comedy satire is hobbled by the obviousness of his characters." The Los Angeles Times opened its review of the film with "The only real response to a thuddingly unfunny vigilante satire like 'May I Kill U' is, 'Well, I hope that filmmaker got something out of his system.'" A positive review came from Film Threat, which called the film "a dark commentary on both the social media fed society at large, and a skewed, contemporary take on the superhero origin story" and stated that "the film is visually quite creative and fun to watch."
