= Ella Dee =

Fictional TV character

- Hex character
- Portrayed by: Laura Pyper

In-universe information
- Gender: Female
- Title: Last of the Anointed Ones
- Occupation: Witch
- Family: John Dee (father); Katherine Constable (mother)

Ella Dee is a fictional character and a witch in the British television series Hex, played by Ulster actress Laura Pyper.

== Plot ==
Ella Dee is the fictional daughter of real-world occultist John Dee and Katherine Constable; Ella notes that her father did not treat her mother well. Some previous encounters between Ella and Azazeal have been revealed. Perhaps their first encounter was in the pharaohs' palace where presumably Ella trapped Azazeal (he notes he still hates the sight of sand). Azazeal mentions that they encountered each other in the Civil War, calling them "good times". The main confrontation that has been shown was in the 17th century. In 1666 Azazeal captured Ella and tortured her before her trial for witchcraft. She was found guilty and almost burnt at the stake until Thelma rescued her. Little else is revealed of Ella's life before Medenham.

== Character ==
Ella Dee became the female lead in the second series of Hex following the departure of Christina Cole. Ella is a 446-year-old witch, "the last of the Anointed Ones" and daughter of the Elizabethan astrologer and occultist John Dee. As an Anointed One, Ella is sworn to prevent Azazeal from conceiving a son by the McBain line of witches. Ella and Azazeal have had many confrontations over the centuries, and Ella has always been successful in foiling Azazeal's plots. This time, however, she arrives too late. Ella's goal changes to killing Malachi, but her resolve is weakened by feelings of love. Azazeal exploits these in his battle against her.

== Powers and abilities ==
As a witch/Anointed One Ella possesses telekinetic powers. She uses these during the series. One of the most impressive examples is in the first episode of season two, where she uses her telekinesis to control strings of lights to catch a lunging Nephilim and then electrocute it to death. In some cases Ella is also able to control and maybe create fire, which may be an extension of her telekinesis (though due to trauma during her witch trial, she is left pyrophobic). As an Anointed One, Ella is immortal until she fulfills her destiny and can harness the power of lightning to kill herself, cross the realm of the dead, and be reborn. This power was only used twice, once by her father, and then by Ella when she was dying after her powers were stripped from her. She says "As an Anointed One, I can pass through the realm of the dead and be reborn," indicating that the other Anointed Ones may have this potential as well.

Her years of training and experience as an Anointed One means she is adept at casting spells and performing rituals, skilled at different forms of hand-to-hand combat and proficient with many weapons such as swords.

Ella possesses numerous objects of power to aid her, such as the Volta which harnesses the power of lightning, the Knife of Orokiah that can cleave both body and soul and the Book/Vision of Orokiah which contains information on demons, witches and spells and incantations. She also briefly possessed the Stone of Belial which allows its user to bend the laws of space and time.
