= Tovarisch, I Am Not Dead =

- Directed by: Stuart Urban
- Produced by: Frances Cook; Emily Harris; Alan Jay; Mark Pegg; Stuart Urban
- Cinematography: Ben Nicolosi-Endo; Shai Peleg
- Edited by: Emily Harris
- Music by: Dirk Campbell
- Production company: Cyclops vision
- Distributed by: Indie Rights; Vectis Vision
- Release date: 2007
- Running time: 85 minutes
- Country: United Kingdom
- Languages: English; Russian
- Box office: $2,397

Tovarisch, I Am Not Dead is a documentary film by Stuart Urban about his father Garri Urban (1916–2004), and also the title of an autobiographical book by Garri Urban describing his survival in, and escape from, Joseph Stalin's Soviet Union. The film was released in 2007. The book was originally published in 1980 by Weidenfeld & Nicolson and in paperback by Cyclops Vision in 2006. It was published in several foreign language editions.

In 1992 Stuart Urban filmed Garri's journey to the former Soviet Union as soon as the Soviet Union disintegrated.

The video diaries and interviews that were made by Stuart Urban over 14 years form the core of the film which documents the quest into Garri's KGB records and the fate of his family in the Holocaust. Contributors to the film include Pulitzer Prize-winning historian, Anne Applebaum.

The film can be categorized as an example of the growing genre of "first person" documentary.

The film was awarded the top prize, the Lancia Award, at the Biografilm Festival in June 2007. It also was nominated for the Raindance Award at the British Independent Film Awards, and won the World Silver Medal at the New York Festivals. It was furthermore shortlisted for the Grierson Awards 2008.
