= Natasha's Story =

1994 book by Michael Nicholson

- Author: Michael Nicholson
- Language: English
- Publication date: 1994
- ISBN: 0-330-33050-0

Natasha's Story is a 1994 book by war correspondent Michael Nicholson and is based on his work for the British news broadcaster, ITN. Deeply shocked about the catastrophic situation of 200 orphaned children in Bosnia and Herzegovina, Nicholson adopted a girl, Natasha, under adventurous circumstances and gave her a new home in England.

The film Welcome to Sarajevo is based on it.
