= Michael Nicholson =

English journalist (1937–2016)

Michael Nicholson OBE
- Born: 9 January 1937; Romford, England
- Died: 11 December 2016 (aged 79)
- Occupation: Journalist
- Spouse: Diana

Michael Nicholson OBE (9 January 1937 – 11 December 2016) was an English journalist and newscaster, specializing in war reporting. He was ITN's Senior Foreign Correspondent.

== Early life ==
Nicholson was born in Romford, Essex, on 9 January 1937, the son of a Royal Engineers officer. He spent part of his childhood in West Germany. He studied at Leicester University.

== Career ==
Nicholson joined ITV in 1964 and over the next forty years he reported from 18 war zones: Biafra, Israel, Vietnam, Cambodia, Congo, Cyprus, Afghanistan, Rwanda, Rhodesia/Zimbabwe, Indo-Pakistan, Northern Ireland, Falklands, Bosnia, Croatia, Kosovo, the Gulf Wars, 'Desert Storm' 1991 and 'Shock and Awe,' Baghdad 2003.

During the War of '71 he spent time in East Pakistan reporting on the civil war and military hostilities between the India and Pakistan. He interviewed President Yahya Khan of Pakistan.

During the Turkish invasion of Cyprus in July 1974, Nicholson's car broke down just as Turkish paratroopers were landing over his head onto the island. Nicholson walked up to the first of them and greeted them with 'I'm Michael Nicholson. Welcome to Cyprus'. His film was flown back to London on an RAF plane and made the evening news the following day.

In 1975, Nicholson went to South Vietnam, and reported several events followed by the Fall of Saigon, including the battle of Newport Bridge (Cầu Tân Cảng), a key passway where ARVN soldiers fighting the last stand against PAVN troops and Vietcong heading for the capital, and the US Embassy gathered around by thousands of panic Vietnamese citizens trying to leave the country by American helicopters. Nicholson got into the embassy compound in the afternoon on April 29, and took one helicopter to USS Hancock waiting in the South China Sea.

Nicholson was ITN's first bureau chief in South Africa, based in Johannesburg from 1976 to 1981 and the first television correspondent to be allowed to live in apartheid South Africa, a brief covering Africa from Cape Town to the Sahara. During this time Nicholson covered the Soweto riots, spent much time in UDI Rhodesia covering the war of independence and was the first foreign journalist to interview Robert Mugabe on his release from prison.

In 1978 he and his cameraman Tom Phillips and sound recordist Micky Doyle, were in Angola to interview the UNITA leader Jonas Savimbi. Pursued by Cuban mercenaries working for the communist MPLA government, they were trapped and spent four and a half months in the bush, walking a total of 1,500 miles, trying to escape. They were eventually airlifted out in a dramatic escape.

In 1981 he returned to Britain, motoring overland through Africa and Europe with his wife Diana and two small sons, Tom and William, a six-month journey of some twelve thousand miles, recorded in the book Across the Limpopo.

Nicholson was on holiday in the Lake District when the Falklands War broke out. Flown by a chartered aircraft to Southampton he boarded the aircraft carrier HMS Hermes for the six-week journey to the South Atlantic. He commented about the experience: "this was the first war, other than Northern Ireland, where I was among my own people. It made it a very special war and the Falklands a very special place." Nicholson and BBC journalist Brian Hanrahan (on his first major foreign story) were regularly flown over to the Royal Fleet auxiliary ships to broadcast their phoned reports, as broadcasting from Royal Navy ships was forbidden. After the conflict, Nicholson was awarded the South Atlantic Medal.

Nicholson also had a sporadic decade-long stint as a television newscaster, becoming known as a presenter on ITN's early evening News at 545. Initially hosting the bulletin on Fridays from its introduction in September 1976 (due to the inclusion of a World News segment on that day), and as a relief newscaster, he began alternating with Leonard Parkin as the regular host of the 545 from 1980 until 1982, when as aforementioned he was recalled as a war reporter to cover the Falklands War, providing a memorable report from Argentina about the sinking of the ARA General Belgrano during the conflict.

In January 1983, he returned to the News At 545, this time as the sole regular host, also making occasional appearances on ITN's weekend news bulletins over the next three years. He would continue this role until March 1986, when he decided to resign from studio newscasting to go back 'on the road'. He became Channel 4's Washington Correspondent for 'Breakfast News' in 1989 and ITN's Chief Foreign Correspondent 1989–1999.

Resuming his career as a war reporter, Nicholson joined the Royal Navy destroyer HMS Gloucester sending dispatches from the Gulf War in 1991. In 1992 he reported from the Yugoslav Wars, based mainly in Sarajevo.

He was the subject of This Is Your Life in 1991, when he was surprised by Michael Aspel at the London offices of ITN.

From 1999-2009 he was a presenter/reporter with ITV's current affair programme 'Tonight', and was employed by BBC Radio 2 and 4. He was also employed by a variety of British national newspapers.

=== Awards ===
- International Film & Television Monte Carlo 'Silver Nymph Award' (1976), for war reporting from the Vietnam War.
- South Atlantic Medal (1982).
- Royal Television Society's 'Journalist of the Year' (1991) (later winning the award three times).
- 'Richard Dimbleby Award' for Services to Television (1992).
- Order of the British Empire (1992).
- 'Specialist Reporter of the Year' (1998), Royal Television Society.

Nicholson was also an EMMY Honours finalist in 1969 for 'Christmas in Biafra' and for 'Shooting the Messenger' in 2009, a Sony Broadcasting Awards finalist (2007), and three times Gold Medalist in New York's Broadcasting Guilds Award.

== Publications ==
Fiction:

- The Partridge Kite
- Red Joker,
- December Ultimatum
- Pilgrim's Rest.
- Dark Rosaleen

Non Fiction:

- A Measure of Danger
- Across the Limpopo
- Natasha's Story
- A State of War Exists – Reporters in the Line of Fire.

== Natasha ==
While reporting from Sarajevo in 1992 Nicholson found 200 orphans living in a mortared and shelled building; four had already been killed. Nicholson pleaded with the authorities to evacuate them, including Natasha, a nine-year-old who had been abandoned by her mother. He smuggled her out of the country, claiming her as his daughter, and handing her to the immigration authorities at London Heathrow airport.

Despite protests from the Bosnian authorities and journalistic critics, Nicholson succeeded in adopting her. Natasha attended local state primary and secondary schools near her home in Surrey and later gained an HND in sports science from the University of Bath.

Nicholson published his experiences in his book, Natasha's Story on which the 1997 film Welcome to Sarajevo is based.

== Personal life ==
Nicholson lived with his wife Diana, two sons Thomas and William, and adopted daughter Natasha in Grayswood, Haslemere, Surrey. He also had a daughter named Ana, whom he adopted from Brazil.

== Death ==
Nicholson died at the age of 79 whilst on a holiday cruise ship in the Persian Gulf with his wife.
