= Hex (TV series) =

- Genre: Supernatural drama; Horror; Dramedy
- Created by: Julian Jones; Lucy Watkins
- Starring: Christina Cole; Jemima Rooper; Michael Fassbender; Laura Pyper; see below
- Opening theme: "#1 Crush" by Garbage
- Composer: James Seymour Brett
- No. of series: 2
- No. of episodes: 19

Production
- Executive producers: Dean Hargrove; Ann Harris; Sara Johnson; Elisabeth Murdoch
- Running time: 45 minutes
- Production companies: Shine TV; Sony Pictures Television International

Original release
- Network: Sky One
- Release: 17 October 2004 – 18 December 2005

Hex is a British television programme developed by Shine TV and airing on Sky One. The story was set in a remote English boarding school with a mysterious past. Series one explored the supernatural relationship between a fallen angel named Azazeal and a student called Cassie who is also a witch. In the second series, the story centred on 500-year-old anointed one Ella Dee, and Azazeal's son Malachi. Both series of the show were released on Region 2 DVD, with the first series released on Region 1 DVD in June 2007.

The show was cancelled in April 2006 after the end of the second series.

== Synopsis ==
From its outset, Hex appears to be the story of Cassie Hughes (Christina Cole), a withdrawn young woman who enrolls at the school but cannot quite seem to fit into the social milieu. The second series shifts the focus from the departing Cassie Hughes to a new heroine, Ella Dee (Laura Pyper).

=== Series 1 ===
Hex is set at a remote English school, Medenham Hall, which occupies the former manor house and grounds of the McBain estate. It was the site of an 18th-century witchcraft scandal in which the female members of the line, the Medenham Witches, were tried and executed. Cassie, who raised herself in a single-parent household caring for her mentally unstable mother, has latent telekinetic, pyrokinetic and clairvoyant abilities that are awakened when she touches an antique vase that had been used in Voodoo rituals by the Medenham Witches. Her roommate, Thelma (who harbors an ill-concealed crush on Cassie), discovers that Cassie is a descendant of the Medenham Witches. Cassie has startling visions and dreams that she strives to interpret, and also struggles with controlling her growing telekinetic and pyrokinetic powers, which she is only able to summon in times of stress.

Cassie is stalked by a "dangerous looking" stranger who calls himself Azazeal. Initially glimpsed fleetingly, he becomes increasingly bold, even entering into the student's rooms later in the series without warning or permission. Azazeal is revealed to be the leader of the biblical Nephilim, fallen angels, and he claims to be in love with Cassie. He has had previous relationships with schoolmistress Jo Watkins and Cassie's own mother, which may have contributed to her mental illness.

Frustrated by his inability to convince Cassie that his claims are sincere, Azazeal kills Thelma before Cassie's eyes as a sacrifice to increase his power and prove that he is truly who he says he is. This act has two unintentional consequences: his power over Cassie is initially weakened by the shock, and Thelma thereafter continues to share Cassie's room as a ghost that only Cassie, Azazeal and other ghosts can see. Thelma never forgives Azazeal for her own death, and is a strong voice against him to Cassie, who has grown to have feelings for him. Thelma is unable to touch the living, but she can touch other ghosts and presumably manipulate inanimate objects (including clothing, artifacts, books, doors, window sashes, and vending machines) and eat, which she does constantly (since ghosts cannot gain weight). Thelma works behind the scenes to spy on Azazeal and gather evidence from places where Cassie cannot enter. Cassie, while horrified by some of Azazeal's behaviour, ultimately finds herself drawn into his power. Azazeal possesses Cassie, and while under his power, she gives herself to him and they conceive a child.

Thelma learns from Peggy, the ghost of a woman who died in the 1918 influenza pandemic, that the gestation of Azazeal's child is weakening the veil between worlds, allowing more ghosts to appear to the living. If the child is born, the veil will be torn, allowing the rest of the Nephilim to enter our world. If the pregnancy is terminated, the veil will heal, preventing the Nephilim from returning and leaving Azazeal the only one of his kind in our world. But there is a side effect: ghosts will also vanish from this world.

Cassie, after much convincing from Thelma decides that her fetus must be aborted, although it is growing at an alarming rate. A week after conception, the doctors believe she is nearing the end of her second trimester. Thelma assists Cassie, without telling her that success means that she may never see Cassie again. Azazeal tries to interfere and save his son, but Cassie goes through with the abortion...or so she thinks. When Thelma realizes that Cassie can still see her, Thelma knows that something has not gone right. Cassie discovers weeks later that the doctor who performed her procedure has been influenced by Azazeal, and that the baby is alive and in Azazeal's care.

=== Series 2 ===
Thelma discovers that Azazeal is raising the child, who is walking already, in an abandoned nearby church. She and Cassie decide that they must somehow get the child, whom Azazeal has named "Malachi", but are clueless as to how to accomplish this. Azazeal becomes aware that they are watching him and tries to convince Cassie that he only wants her to join them so that they can be a "real family". Cassie, still partially under his spell, is obviously attracted by the prospect but retains enough of herself to know that this is something she should not want.

While Cassie and Thelma strategize, new characters are introduced at the school while old ones depart. Troy, convinced that Cassie's child is his, leaves the school at the end of the first series. Jo Watkins, having "really let herself go," is seldom seen at school as she has become Azazeal's live-in nurse and nanny. The school gains a new chaplain, Jez Heriot, who doesn't "wear the uniform" except when conducting services and also teaches Ethics. When Jo effectively disappears, David Tyrel asks Jez to take her classes as well. The students don't initially realize that he is a priest, and Roxanne is quite taken with him, so much so that she can't help but seduce him even after the truth is known. A new student arrives at Medenham: Ella Dee. Her wardrobe instantly wins her points with the boys, evokes jealousy in the girls, and makes the faculty uncomfortable. Thelma is mildly attracted until she realizes that Ella can see her. There are other anomalies: Ella's tuition is paid by a corporation and her family background is unknown. She also seems to know entirely too much about Cassie... and Azazeal.

It is quickly revealed that Ella is definitely not what she seems. She is 445 years old and the daughter of John Dee. Ella is also a witch and has been hunting Azazeal for centuries. So far, she has been very successful in preventing Azazeal from begetting a son by a mortal witch. This time, however, Ella was too late. Her mission: kill Malachi.

Ella instantly takes charge of both Cassie and Thelma, and formulates a plan to kidnap Malachi and sacrifice him in the school chapel. They are successful in grabbing the child, but Azazeal follows them and a series of alternately foolish and selfish decisions leads the girls inexorably to tragedy. With Azazeal present, Cassie loses her resolve and throws her body between Ella and Malachi. She dies instantly when Ella can't stop her killing blow, and Azazeal regains Malachi and retreats.

Ella tries to devise a new strategy while Thelma tries to deal with her deep sense of loss, but Ella loses her edge as she feels herself falling for Leon. Azazeal appeals to Thelma's own selfish desires and convinces her to steal and give him the Stone of Belial, one of Ella's objects of power, in exchange for a last meeting with Cassie. Jez is revealed to be Ramiel, another of the Nephilim and Azazeal's "right-hand entity". With the Stone in their possession, Azazeal and Ramiel conspire to drive Ella insane by forcing her to relive the 17th century witch trial in which she was found guilty and nearly executed. Azazeal uses the Stone of Belial on Thelma, who travels back to Ella's witch trial and rescues her from execution in the past. Ramiel's scheming and manipulation leads to Ella's commitment in an insane asylum, where a triumphant Azazeal seemingly abandons her.

Ella rapidly ages as she is stripped of her powers, but after Leon is brought in on her secret and is granted the power to see Thelma, he helps to revive her using the Volta. A friend of Leon who helped him get Ella out of the hospital (where she was cared for by Azazeal's lover Perie the Faerie) is tortured by Azazeal and the now teenaged Malachi, who kills him out of pity.

Azazeal is asked to leave by "higher powers" and enlists Malachi at Medenham Hall. He and Ella say their goodbyes; with Malachi born, Ella has no desire to kill him, and Azazeal leaves the Stone of Belial in Malachi's possession. Ella kills Jez and makes it look like suicide, precipitated by the revelation that he was having an affair with a student, which deeply affects Roxanne, who felt responsible because she had seduced him.

Ella and Malachi romance one another magically and otherwise, and their respective mentors, the Archangel Raphael and the demon Mephistopheles, both use psychological tactics to get them to do as they wish. Ella and Malachi eventually have sex, as the evil side had wanted, and by fulfilling Ella's true desire (to be normal), she is made a slave to Malachi – his succubus.

Malachi kills a lesbian girl named Maya so that her ghost can consort with Thelma and give him leverage. Ella's enslavement to Malachi is ended by Thelma, who invaded her dreams and invoked her greatest fear: fire. Leon attempts to kill Malachi, but is betrayed by Thelma (in hopes of keeping herself and Maya together in the living world) and saved by Ella after Malachi sends a fallen Archangel, Sariel, to attack him. Mephistopheles betrays the cause of evil by helping Ella save Leon, who he feels did not need to die, and is subsequently punished and has his eyes removed. Raphael falls from grace by trying to rape Ella, who announces at this point that she no longer works for Raphael's master, God, and is a freelance agent at last.

Ella loses all her feelings for Malachi, who quickly moves on to romancing Alex and other girls in the school. He eventually seduces the entire student body, creating an army of succubi and incubi that makes him too powerful for Ella to kill. The only students who are not converted are Roxanne (who becomes a "pure soul" in her quest for forgiveness from God for seducing Jez and causing his apparent suicide), Tom (who is secretly gay, in love with Leon, and impossible to convert because Malachi cannot make Leon love him back), Thelma (because after Ella later kills Maya, he has no hold over her), and Ella herself, who had already been freed from Malachi's spell.

Ella digs up Maya's corpse and beheads it, which destroys Maya's lingering presence on Earth. Leon tries to kill Alex but cannot go through with it, leaving him feeling inferior to Ella. Jo Watkins returns as Malachi's new emissary from the "higher powers" and restores her position as headmistress by framing David Tyrel for embezzlement of school funds. Malachi cannot convert Tom, so he fakes the "mark of Malachi" on his neck and ensures that Leon will see it. Fooled by the false mark, Leon kills Tom, but by doing so, he achieves his greatest desire (not being inferior to Ella) and becomes an incubus of Malachi.

Leon almost kills Ella with knowledge gained from the Book of Orokiah, but Thelma helps to save her. He is locked in a cage and sedated, at which point Thelma saves him from Malachi by invoking his greatest fear (having his penis amputated). Returned to normal, he still ends his relationship with Ella and leaves the school. Roxanne is given the ability to see ghosts, and Thelma pretends to be an angel to get her to steal the Stone of Belial back from Malachi. Ella uses the Stone to travel back in time and attempts to kill Malachi while he is still a baby (at the end of Series 1), but she is attacked by Perie the Faerie and receives a mortal wound to the chest. Ella returns to Medenham Hall where she confesses her love for Leon as she lies dying under the watchful eyes of Thelma.

Rejected by Hell, Mephistopheles convinces Leon to return, where he saves Ella by cauterizing her wound. Malachi sacrifices the pure-of-heart Roxanne to "enrage God" by killing one of "His creatures." The school is set ablaze and Thelma, Ella, and Leon escape from it to a field somewhere. As Malachi has started the "End of Days," described by Mephistopheles as the final battle between good and evil, the series ends with blood pouring from a rock bearing the mark of Azazeal, similar to Malachi's.

== Cast ==
The Hex cast consists mainly of students and teachers of Medenham Hall in addition with several recurring supernatural characters.

=== Series 1 ===
Main characters Thelma, Ella, Azazeal and Cassie as portrayed by Jemima Rooper, Laura Pyper, Michael Fassbender and Christina Cole.

- Cassandra "Cassie" Hughes (Christina Cole) is a descendant of the Medanham Witches and becomes tempted by Azazeal.
- Thelma Bates (Jemima Rooper) is the ghost of Cassie's best friend and is in love with her.
- Azazeal (Michael Fassbender) is a Fallen Angel and leader of the Nephilim. He seduces Cassie in order to have a son.
- Leon Taylor (Jamie Davis) is a fellow student. He becomes the love interest of Ella and gets pulled into the world of supernatural by Thelma in order to save Ella's life.
- Roxanne Davenport (Amber Sainsbury) is first portrayed as a manipulative and cold leader of the school's elite, but later becomes devoted to God in order to make peace with her actions.
- Jo Watkins (Anna Wilson-Jones) is a teacher at Medanham Hall. She falls under the thrall of Azazeal and becomes his mistress.
- David Tyrel (Colin Salmon) is the Headmaster of Medanham Hall and regularly interacts with the student body. He is also aware of the school grounds' gruesome past.
- Troy (Joseph Morgan) is the roommate and friend of Leon. He dates Cassie, but later leaves Medanham Hall.
- Gemma (Zoe Tapper) is a friend of Leon, Roxanne and Troy.

Also appearing in Series One is Geraldine James as Cassie's mother, Lilith Hughes. Recurring cast included Jessica Oyelowo as Rachel McBain, Holly Lumsden as Esther McBain and Katy Carmichael as Peggy.

- Directed by Brian Grant

=== Series 2 ===
Following the departure of some regulars from the first series (notably Christina Cole and Michael Fassbender), the second saw the introduction of several new characters.

- Ella Dee (Laura Pyper) is a witch who has been trying to stop Azazeal from having a child for centuries. She develops feelings towards Leon.
- Malachi (Joseph Beattie) is the son of Cassie and Azazeal. After his quick growth during the first episodes of Series Two, he enrolls to Medanham Hall in order to seduce its student body.
- Tom Wright (Samuel Collings) is Leon's new roommate after Troy leaves Medenham Hall at the end of Series One. He is secretly gay and in love with Leon.

Recurring cast for Series Two included Stephen Wight as Felix, Jemima Abey as Alex, Sam Troughton as Jez Heriot/Ramiel, Ronan Vibert as Mephistopheles, Katrine De Candole as Perie the Faerie, Laura Donnelly as Maya Robertson, Leon Ford as Max Rosen, Grant Parsons as Dr. Surtees and Anatole Taubman as Raphael.

== Film location ==
Hex was filmed at Englefield House, a Tudor manor modified in the 18th and 19th centuries. Several external scenes in Series 2 were filmed in the city of St Albans (Hertfordshire), using locations such as the city centre, the Cathedral grounds and a small street adjacent to it.

== Episodes ==
=== Series 1 (2004) ===
No.	Title	Directed by	Written by	Original release date	Viewers (millions)
1–2	"The Story Begins (Parts 1 & 2)"	Brian Grant	Julian Jones	17 October 2004	0.9
Cassie must face her destiny when she is unwittingly led to unleash a curse at her public school. Cassie begins to have disturbing dreams, as Azazeal makes the sacrifice he needs to regain his strength.
3	"Life Goes On"	Brian Grant	Lucy Watkins	24 October 2004	0.73
Cassie continues to have sightings of Azazeal, and Thelma is worried. Troy, meanwhile, begins to finally show interest in Cassie.
4	"Deeper into Darkness"	Brian Grant	Lucy Watkins	31 October 2004	0.8
Azazeal, desperate, manipulates Cassie through her mother.
5	"Possession"	Brian Grant	Julian Jones & Lucy Watkins	7 November 2004	N/A (<0.76) (Note: Not reported in the weekly top 10 programmes for Sky One.)
Thelma, unable to get through to Cassie, resorts to extreme measures. Meanwhile, Cassie is being brutal to Troy.
6	"The Release"	Brian Grant	Julian Jones & Lucy Watkins	14 November 2004	N/A (<0.76)
Cassie must resist Azazeal to do the right thing, but he's working behind the scenes to get what he desires and Thelma fears for her existence.

=== Series 2 (2005) ===
No. overall	No. in series	Title	Directed by	Written by	Original release date	Viewers (millions)
7	1	"Cursed"	Brian Grant	Lucy Watkins	18 September 2005	N/A (Note: No data for Sky One was available for this week.)
Cassie begins having nightmares and is stalked by the Nephilim, all the while she and Thelma search for the baby.
8	2	"Death Takes the Mother"	Brian Grant	Peter Tabern	25 September 2005	N/A (<0.509)
Cassie attempts to steal her baby back from Azazeal, as Ella prepares for the ritual, and another sacrifice is made.
9	3	"Spiral"	Brian Grant	Lucy Watkins	2 October 2005	N/A (<0.621)
Ella toys with Leon to draw a seraph out, Roxanne continues with her plan of seduction, and Thelma negotiates with Azazeal.
10	4	"Ella Burns"	Brian Grant	Jake Michie	16 October 2005	N/A (<0.616)
Thelma's deal with Azazeal has tragic results for Ella.
11	5	"With A Little Help From My Friends, Part 1"	Brian Grant	Peter Tabern	23 October 2005	N/A (<0.647)
With Ella declared a Section 2, Thelma turns to Leon for her rescue.
12	6	"With A Little Help From My Friends, Part 2"	Andy Goddard	Lucy Watkins	30 October 2005	N/A (<0.565)
Ella gets sicker as mortality creeps up on her, and Malachi's behaviour concerns Azazeal.
13	7	"Noir"	Andy Goddard	Peter Tabern	6 November 2005	N/A (<0.629)
Ella and Thelma set about the overthrow of Jez, and Malachi hits town with surprising results.
14	8	"Where The Heart Is"	Julian Murphy	Lucy Watkins	13 November 2005	N/A (<0.657)
Malachi begins to pursue Ella in earnest, Thelma gains a companion, and Leon makes a misstep.
15	9	"Doomed"	Brian Grant	Jake Michie	20 November 2005	N/A (<0.750)
Malachi's and Ella's feelings for each other cause physical problems, Leon plays it cool, and Thelma worries about a mark on Maya.
16	10	"You Lose"	Brian Grant	Lucy Watkins	27 November 2005	N/A (<0.677)
Ella has done a complete turn-about and is slavishly catering to Malachi who's exploring his newly discovered powers, and it's up to Leon again to save the day – unless Thelma gets in his way.
17	11	"Hole"	Brian Grant	Jake Michie	4 December 2005	N/A (<0.685)
Malachi finds the source of his power, and Ella's means of diminishing it have repercussions for Thelma.
18	12	"Seven Deadly Sins"	Brian Grant	Lucy Watkins	11 December 2005	N/A (<0.584)
Malachi schemes to reach Leon and Tom, and Thelma's loss helps her choose sides.
19	13	"The Showdown"	Brian Grant	Lucy Watkins	18 December 2005	N/A (<0.644)
The countdown begins to the end of days, and help comes from an unlikely source.

== Reception ==
The show received generally positive reviews, and holds a Metacritic score of 66 out of 100.

== Home media ==
DVD	Release date		
DVD	Region 1	Region 2	Region 4
Hex Complete Series 1	5 June 2007	19 September 2005	5 November 2005
Hex Complete Series 2	N/A	6 March 2006	24 October 2006

The region 1 release is labeled as "Season 1" and contains 10 episodes, all of Series 1 plus the first four episodes of Series 2 in keeping with how BBC America had presented the show in US broadcasts.

Mill Creek Entertainment announced the complete series on DVD.

== See also ==
- List of ghost films
