= The UnHolylands =

2024 Northern Irish film

- Directed by: Paddy Duffy
- Written by: Paddy Duffy
- Produced by: Paddy Duffy; Lucy Johnston; Thomas Pollock
- Starring: Ciaran McCourt; Peter Jeffries; Sean Daly; Paddy Duffy; Sandi Brown; James Nesbitt
- Cinematography: Thomas O'Loan
- Edited by: Paddy Duffy
- Release dates: November 6, 2024 (Belfast); October 3, 2025 (UK)
- Running time: 101 mins.
- Country: Northern Ireland
- Language: English

The UnHolylands is a 2024 Northern Irish coming-of-age comedy film, written, directed, edited, and co-produced by Paddy Duffy. It stars Ciaran McCourt, Peter Jeffries, Sean Daly, and James Nesbitt. It premiered at the Belfast Film Festival in 2024, before a later release in Ireland and the UK in 2025.

== Synopsis ==
Michael and Scott plan one last house party as their University days come to an end. When their lawyer father forbids it and threatens their job prospects, a colleague is sent to keep an eye on them as the boys must decide their future.

== Cast ==
- Ciaran McCourt as Michael Brennan
- Peter Jeffries as Scott Anderson
- Sean Daly as Alister Griffiths
- Paddy Duffy as Dean
- Larry Cowan as Mr. Brennan
- Malachy McGinley as 100-Pound-Coke Hank
- Sandi Brown as Eileen
- James Nesbitt as Himself

== Reception ==
Sophie Clarke of The Irish News called the film "a heartfelt riot", and was thrilled "to see Northern Ireland featuring as such a ubiquitous backdrop". Conor McParland of Belfast Media said that James Nesbitt played "a brilliantly exaggerated version of himself".

Frank Mitchell of the Belfast Telegraph praised director/writer Paddy Duffy for "shining a new light on this somewhat controversial area". Sophie McLaughlin of Belfast Live lauded the lead actors, stating "Ciaran McCourt and Peter Jeffries have seriously bright futures on the screen and it is their dynamic".

But not all reviews have been positive. A plethora of reviews from Letterboxd have rated the film poorly, such as Zach Kidd who rated it 0.5/5 stars and declared "The amount of atrocities this movie commits to the art of cinema is truly despicable".
