= Welcome to Sarajevo =

- Directed by: Michael Winterbottom
- Written by: Frank Cottrell Boyce
- Based on: Natasha's Story by Michael Nicholson
- Produced by: Damian Jones; Ismet Arnautalić; Graham Broadbent; Paul Sarony; Ivo Šunjić; David Ball
- Starring: Stephen Dillane; Woody Harrelson; Marisa Tomei; Emira Nušević; Kerry Fox; Goran Višnjić; James Nesbitt; Emily Lloyd
- Cinematography: Daf Hobson
- Edited by: Trevor Waite
- Music by: Adrian Johnston
- Production companies: Channel Four Films; Dragon Pictures
- Distributed by: FilmFour Distributors (United Kingdom); Miramax Films (United States, Canada, Australia, New Zealand, France, Benelux, Spain and Germany)
- Release dates: 9 May 1997 (Cannes); 12 September 1997 (TIFF); 21 November 1997 (United Kingdom); 26 November 1997 (United States)
- Running time: 103 minutes
- Countries: United Kingdom; United States
- Languages: English; Bosnian; Croatian; Serbian
- Budget: $9 million
- Box office: $1.6 million

Welcome to Sarajevo is a 1997 war drama film directed by Michael Winterbottom, written by Frank Cottrell Boyce and is based on the book Natasha's Story by Michael Nicholson. The film stars Stephen Dillane, Woody Harrelson, Marisa Tomei, Emira Nušević, Kerry Fox, Goran Višnjić, James Nesbitt, and Emily Lloyd.

Welcome to Sarajevo had its world premieres at Cannes and the Toronto International Film Festival in May and September 1997, and was released in the United Kingdom on 21 November 1997, by FilmFour Distributors, and in the United States on 26 November 1997, by Miramax Films.

== Plot ==
In 1992, ITN reporter Michael Henderson travels to Sarajevo, the besieged capital of Bosnia and Herzegovina, during the ongoing war. There, he meets American star journalist Jimmy Flynn on the chase for the most exciting stories and pictures.

Henderson and Flynn have friendly discussions and differences in the intervals between reporting. They stay at the Holiday Inn, which was the primary hotel for the press in Sarajevo during the siege. After a previous translator proves corrupt and inept, ITN hires Risto Bavić to be Henderson's translator.

Their work permits them harrowing and unobstructed views of the suffering of the people of Sarajevo. The situation changes when Henderson makes a report from Ljubica Ivezic, an orphanage located on the front lines, in which two hundred children live in desperate conditions. After increasingly indiscriminate attacks fail to make the lead story in the United Kingdom, Henderson makes the orphanage his lead story to try to bring full attention to the war and encourage the evacuation of the children to safety.

When American aid worker Nina organizes a UN-sanctioned bus-borne evacuation of Sarajevan children to Italy, Henderson convinces her to include Emira, a Bosniak girl from the orphanage, to whom Henderson had made a promise to evacuate. Nina knows this is an illegal act, only transfers to relatives abroad have been authorised, but the orphanage director allows it because of the desperate circumstances. Henderson and his cameraman accompany the evacuation under the pretence of covering it as a news story. However, Bosnian Serbs hinder the evacuation at several points along its route. In the final harassment, armed Chetniks halt the bus, select and forcibly disembark the Bosnian Serb orphans, identifying them through their first names, and take them away on their lorry, as they refuse to let them go to the West.

Henderson makes it home to London with Emira, adopting her into his family. After several months, Henderson receives word from a former producer in Sarajevo that Emira's estranged mother wants her back. Henderson, who didn't know that her mother was living, returns to Sarajevo, now driven not only by the siege but also by organised crime, and seeks out Risto, who has become a Bosnian soldier.

Henderson asks him to help find Emira's mother. They discover from a relative that Emira was put into the orphanage as an infant by her mother under familial pressure. When Risto is killed in his home by a sniper, Henderson asks for help from Zeljko, a concierge at the Holiday Inn, who Henderson had helped in the past. Zeljko negotiates the streets and road-blocks that lead to Emira's mother, who is desperate for the girl to live with her. However, she is persuaded that Emira is happy in England and so signs the adoption papers.

A running joke in the movie is the designation by a UN official that Sarajevo was only the 14th worst crisis in the world. In the middle of the movie, Harun, a cellist friend of Risto, says that he would play a concert on the streets of Sarajevo once it is designated the worst place on Earth. Though he acknowledges the danger, he claims that "the people will die happily listening to my music." The movie ends with Harun holding a "concert of peace" on a hill overlooking Sarajevo, playing his cello to hundreds of Sarajevans. Among the attendees are Henderson, Flynn and several children from the orphanage. Henderson gives Harun a sad smile; the concert is beautiful, but it also means that Sarajevo had, indeed, become the worst place on Earth.

The closing credits say that Emira still lives in England.

== Cast ==
- Stephen Dillane as Michael Henderson
- Woody Harrelson as Jordan Flynn
- Marisa Tomei as Nina
- Emira Nušević as herself
- Kerry Fox as Jane Carson
- Goran Višnjić as Risto Bavić
- James Nesbitt as Gregg
- Emily Lloyd as Annie McGee
- Igor Džambazov as Jacket
- Gordana Gadžić as Mrs. Savić
- Juliet Aubrey as Helen Henderson
- Drazen Šivak as Željko
- Vesna Orel as Munira Hodžić
- Frank Dillane as Christopher Henderson
- Davor Janjić as Dragan
- Labina Mitevska as Sonja

== Style ==
Michael Winterbottom portrays the events with brutality. In the opening sequence, there is a sniper attack on a wedding procession. Other shocking sequences include Henderson stumbling upon a massacre at a farm-house, a Bosnian-Serb officer nonchalantly executing groups of Bosniaks and Henderson's arrival in the immediate aftermath of the first of the Markale Massacres.

Shot just a few months after the war on locations in Sarajevo and Croatia, the film uses real ruins and war debris to give the film a feeling of authenticity. Many scenes of the characters witnessing and reporting on street carnage were intercut with video footage of the historic events.

== Soundtrack ==
Two widely known pieces of music were among those used in the film. "Don't Worry Be Happy" by Bobby McFerrin is played against scenes of the siege of Sarajevo, with people being wounded by bombs, blood everywhere on the streets, etc. The second piece is "Adagio in G minor" by Remo Giazotto, based on a fragment from Sonata in G minor by Tomaso Giovanni Albinoni. The House of Love's "Shine On" (Creation, 1987) and Stone Roses' "I Wanna Be Adored" (Silvertone, 1989) are among the independent rock songs featured in contrast to the dark barbarism affecting the people of Sarajevo.

== Release ==
The film made its world premiere on May 9 at the 1997 Cannes Film Festival.

It was screened at the Coca-Cola Open Air Cinema at the 32nd Sarajevo Film Festival, in the Open Air section on 18 August 2026.

== Reception ==
=== Critical reception ===
On review aggregator website Rotten Tomatoes, the film has a 78% approval rating based on 36 reviews, with an average ranking of 6.8/10. On Metacritic, the film has a weighted average score of 72 out of a 100 based on 24 critics, indicating "generally favorable reviews".

Lisa Schwarzbaum of Entertainment Weekly gave Welcome to Sarajevo an "A−". Time Out commended the film's choice of a "crisp [and] rigorously unsentimental director". Marc Savlov of The Austin Chronicle praised the film for "[b]ring[ing] up some hard questions about the sheer impossibility of foreign correspondents remaining true to their journalistic neutrality in a war zone". Edward Guthmann of the San Francisco Chronicle called the film "a compelling but jumbled film that examines the line between journalistic detachment and passion".

In a more negative review, Janet Maslin of The New York Times wrote "However closely they mirror the real experience of Mr. Nicholson and others, some of the shocks here are too sadly predictable". A similar opinion was shared by Roger Ebert of the Chicago Sun-Times, who wrote that "Too often we sense that the actors are drifting and the story is at sea", in an "air of improvisation" that "combines fact and fiction", giving the film a two-star review.

=== Box office ===
The film opened on 108 screens in the United Kingdom and grossed $199,659 in its opening weekend, finishing in tenth place at the UK box office. It halved the number of screens in its second weekend finishing with a total gross of $395,710 after 10 days. In the United States it opened on 5 screens and grossed $89,274 over the Thanksgiving holiday and went on to gross $334,319. It grossed $344,000 in Japan, $230,000 in Australia and $300,000 in Germany, Italy and France for a worldwide total of over $1.6 million.

== Awards and nominations ==
It was nominated for the Golden Palm and for the Golden Hugo at the Chicago International Film Festival. It was awarded a "Special Recognition for Excellence in Filmmaking" by the National Board of Review (USA) during the 69th National Board of Review Awards (1997).

== Home media ==
In the United States, the film was released on VHS in 1998 by Buena Vista Home Entertainment (under the Miramax Home Entertainment banner). The UK VHS was released by VCI and FilmFour on May 25, 1998. It received a US LaserDisc release on July 8, 1998, from Buena Vista Home Entertainment. From 2003 to 2004, the film was released on DVD by Buena Vista Home Entertainment in several countries, including Australia, Germany and the United States, The US DVD was released on February 3, 2004 and had a 23 minute documentary titled "Locked and Loaded", which takes a look at the work of reporters who go into warzones to report and the way that the media shapes the way that audiences see conflicts around the world. The film received a British DVD release around the same time, which was handled by FilmFour.

In December 2010, Miramax was sold by The Walt Disney Company, their owners since 1993. That same month, the studio was taken over by private equity firm Filmyard Holdings. In 2011, Filmyard Holdings licensed the Miramax library to streamer Netflix. This deal included Welcome to Sarajevo, and ran for five years, eventually ending on June 1, 2016.

In March 2016, Filmyard Holdings sold Miramax to Qatari company beIN Media Group. Then in April 2020, ViacomCBS (now known as Paramount Skydance) bought a 49% stake in Miramax, which gave them the rights to all 700 films from Miramax's library. As a result of this deal, the film is now distributed outside of the UK by Paramount Pictures.
