= Laura Pyper =

British actress

- Born: 1980 (age 45–46); Magherafelt, Northern Ireland
- Education: Trinity College, Dublin
- Occupation: Actress
- Years active: 2002–present

Laura Pyper is a Northern Irish actress, known for portraying Ella Dee in the second season of Hex, Jane Fairfax in Emma and Lexine Murdoch in the video game Dead Space: Extraction. She also played Lesley Howell in The Secret on ITV, which was first broadcast in April and May 2016.

== Background ==
Born in Magherafelt, Northern Ireland, Pyper has two brothers and two sisters. She attended Rainey Endowed School and later studied English and Drama at Trinity College, Dublin.

== Career ==
Pyper made her film debut playing Lin in Reign of Fire, a role she won while still studying. She has also appeared in the Irish film Headrush, playing Vicky Nobel.

On television, Pyper played Ella Dee in the second season of the Sky One supernatural drama Hex, and Jane Fairfax in the 2009 BBC adaptation of Jane Austen's Emma. She has also guest starred in episodes of Demons, Doctors, Silent Witness, The Bill and Bachelors Walk.

Pyper has also worked as a voice actor in the video game Dead Space: Extraction, playing the character of Lexine Murdoch.

Pyper's theatre credits include Don Juan in Soho at the Donmar Warehouse and Blackwater Angel at the Finborough Theatre. In 2009 she played Cressida in the first full-scale Shakespeare's Globe production of Troilus and Cressida. In 2010 she played Lily Cahill in the revival of Punk Rock. She played Laurel in Douglas Hodge's production of Torch Song Trilogy at the Menier Chocolate Factory in 2012, Mrs Manningham in Gas Light at Salisbury Playhouse in 2014 and Beatrice in A View from the Bridge at York Theatre Royal and Royal & Derngate in 2019.

== Filmography ==
List of television performances
Title	Year	Role	Notes
Bachelors Walk	2003	Vicki Lester	Episodes: 3.1, 3.2
Omagh	2004	Lorraine Wilson	TV movie
Holby City	2004	Alison Kerman	Episode: "Playing With Fire"
Hex	2005	Ella Dee	TV series, 13 episodes
The IT Crowd	2006	Laura	Episode: "Yesterday’s Jam"
Doctors	2007	Hannah Farmer	Episode: "The Big Issue"
The Bill	2008	Mandy Glover	"Shadow Stalker", "Spilt Blood"
Silent Witness	2008	Esther Rubutkin	"Judgement" Part 1 & 2
Demons	2009	Grace	Episode: "Saving Grace"
Vidiotic	2009		TV movie
The Bill	2009	Sarah Lawler	Episode: "Old Habits"
Doctors	2009	Ursula Lenton	Episode: “Dummy"
Emma	2009	Jane Fairfax	TV mini-series, 3 episodes
Spooks	2009	Young Woman	Episode 8.4
Holby City	2011	Becky Unwin	Episode: "The Hand That Bites"
Luther	2013	Jodie	1 episode: Series 3, episode 2
The Secret	2016	Lesley Howell	Episode 1 & 2
The Missing	2016	Anna Stone	1 episode: Series 2, episode 5: Das Vergessen
Father Brown	2019	Phoebe Sims	1 episode: Series 7, episode 2: The Passing Bell

List of film performances
Title	Year	Role	Notes
Reign of Fire	2002	Lin	
Padraig agus Nadia	2002	Nadia	Short film
Headrush	2003	Vicky Nobel	
Tess: A Tale of Love and Darkness	2005	Tess	Short film
Sam and Jenny Go to a Play	2009	Jenny	Short film
Isle of Dogs	2010	Kelly	
Looking for Neil	2011	Lucy	Short film

== Theatre ==
- Blackwater Angel - Finborough Theatre, February - March 2006 (playing Lizzie Maher)
- Don Juan in Soho - Donmar Warehouse, November 2006 – February 2007 (playing Elvira)
- Troilus and Cressida - Shakespeare's Globe, July - September 2009 (playing Cressida)
- Punk Rock - Lyric Hammersmith and tour, September - November 2010 (playing Lily Cahill)
- Torch Song Trilogy - Menier Chocolate Factory, May 2012 (playing Laurel)
- Gas Light - Salisbury Playhouse, March 2014 (playing Mrs Manningham)
- A View from the Bridge - York Theatre Royal and Royal & Derngate, September - October 2019 (playing Beatrice)
- Dancing at Lughnasa - Crucible and Royal Exchange Theatre, 13 September - 8 November 2025 (playing Agnes)
