= Mark Redhead =

British producer & director

Mark Redhead is a British producer, director, and occasional actor. He was the producer of Bloody Sunday and an executive producer of God on Trial. He has been nominated for several awards and won a BAFTA TV Award in 2000 for The Murder of Stephen Lawrence.

== Biography ==
Redhead was born in Newcastle upon Tyne. He attended Uppingham School, Rutland, and Newcastle University. He is related to the broadcaster Brian Redhead.

== Filmography ==
- Bloody Sunday - Producer
- God on Trial - Executive Producer
