= Murders of Lesley Howell and Trevor Buchanan =

1991 double murder in Northern Ireland

On 18 May 1991, Lesley Howell (31) and Trevor Buchanan (32) were murdered in County Londonderry, Northern Ireland, in a staged double killing carried out by Howell's husband, Colin Howell, who sought to disguise their deaths as a suicide pact. At the time, Colin Howell had resumed an extra-marital affair with Buchanan’s wife, Hazel; in his later confession, he stated that the affair formed part of the circumstances leading to the killings. The case remained officially closed for almost two decades until Colin Howell confessed in 2009, leading to his conviction and that of Hazel (by then Stewart). The killings, subsequent investigation and later trials attracted significant public attention and were later dramatised in the ITV series The Secret, broadcast in April and May 2016. The confession tape was broadcast in a BBC documentary in January 2026.

== Background ==
Lesley Howell (née Clarke) and Trevor Buchanan were both members of the same Baptist church community in Coleraine, where their families were closely involved in congregational life. Lesley, who had married Colin Howell in 1983 and had four young children, was active within the church and part of a wider network of families. Trevor, an RUC officer, lived nearby with his wife Hazel and their two children, and the Buchanans were similarly engaged in church activities.

In 1990, an extra‑marital relationship began between Hazel and Colin. The affair, which caused significant strain within both households, was discovered by their spouses and by members of the church congregation. Although it appeared to end after becoming public, the relationship resumed in early 1991.

== Murders and aftermath ==
On the night of 18 May 1991, while the couple's young children slept, Colin murdered his wife at their home by attaching a garden hose to the exhaust of his Renault Savanna, feeding the hose into the house, and holding it close to his sleeping wife's face while the engine was running. Lesley awoke and cried out for her eldest son, Matthew, at which point Colin restrained her until she died from carbon‑monoxide poisoning.

He placed her body in the boot of the car, covered it with a bicycle, and then drove to the Buchanans' home, where he repeated the process. After placing Trevor's body in the vehicle, Colin drove towards his father‑in‑law's house, stopping en route to leave the bicycle at a nature reserve. On arriving in Castlerock, he backed the car into the garage, positioned the bodies inside the vehicle, ran the hose into the car, and turned on the ignition. He then ran along Castlerock beach to avoid being seen, burned the clothes he had been wearing, and cycled home.

Following his wife's death, Colin received an insurance payout of £400,000. He later married Kyle Jorgensen, a native of New York, with whom he had five children. His former brother‑in‑law has since accused him of murdering Harry Clarke, Colin's father‑in‑law, who died only eleven days before Lesley.

In May 2007, Lesley's and Colin's eldest son, 22-year-old Matthew, died in Russia after he fell four floors from an apartment block in St Petersburg.

== Philippines scam ==
In 2008, Colin lost £350,000 in a get-rich-quick scheme that claimed to have located Yamashita's gold in the Philippines. He had been led to believe he would make £20 million; instead, he received only a few brass ammunition boxes containing silver coins worth about £30. Colin initially invested £100,000 but, over six months, continued to invest after being told that the gold was buried beneath booby-trapped tunnels. He sold his shares in two dental practices and attempted to persuade friends to invest.

He later stated that both this financial loss and the death of his son were punishments from God.

== Murder confession and convictions ==
In 2009, Colin confessed his role in the murders to elders in his church, who urged him to inform police. He pleaded guilty to the murders on 18 November 2010 and was sentenced to life imprisonment, with a minimum term of 21 years before he could be considered for release.

Hazel (née Elkin), who later married David Stewart after a seven-year relationship with Colin, claimed in court that she had acted under duress. She was found guilty of the murders of Lesley and Trevor in March 2011 and sentenced to life imprisonment with a minimum term of 18 years. The trial judge stated that Hazel could have prevented Trevor's death.

Police investigators were later criticised for having overlooked several facts, most notably that the driver's window was open and that Trevor's leg was hanging out of the open car door; in addition, a witness had told police that Colin had previously attempted to murder his wife.

On 17 May 2011, Colin pleaded guilty to sexually assaulting nine female patients in his surgery over a period of several years. He was subsequently stripped of his National Health Service pension.

== See also ==
- Let This Be Our Secret (2011 novel)
- The Secret (2016 miniseries)
