= List of The Wayans Bros. episodes =

The Wayans Bros. is an American sitcom that aired on The WB from January 11, 1995, to May 20, 1999, with 101 episodes produced spanning five seasons. The series starred Shawn and Marlon Wayans as brothers Shawn and Marlon Williams living in New York City.

== Series overview ==
Season	Episodes	Originally released	
Season	Episodes	First released	Last released
1	13	January 11, 1995	May 24, 1995
2	22	September 6, 1995	May 15, 1996
3	22	September 4, 1996	May 14, 1997
4	22	September 17, 1997	May 20, 1998
5	22	September 17, 1998	May 20, 1999

== Episodes ==
=== Season 1 (1995) ===
No. overall	No. in season	Title	Directed by	Written by	Original release date	Prod. code	Viewers (millions)
1	1	"Goop-Hair-It-Is"	Shelley Jensen	Jane Milmore & Billy Van Zandt	January 11, 1995	456853	2.9
Shawn and Marlon's latest scheme becomes a hair-raising nightmare when they take over the manufacture and marketing of a grooming product called "Goop, Hair-It-Is." While Marlon comes up with a concoction that makes his hair look great, Shawn decides to sell the hair goop on an infomercial. They shoot the infomercial live, with Gary Coleman acting as a celebrity spokesperson. While Gary is doing his pitch for "Goop, Hair-It-Is," the chemicals from the product cause his hair to catch fire. Shawn and Marlon's dreams of becoming successful entrepreneurs also go down in flames.
2	2	"First Class"	Joel Zwick	Boyd Hale	January 18, 1995	456851	3.6
Marlon pretends to be basketball player John Starks to get first class seats on an airplane.
3	3	"I'm Too Sexy for My Brother"	Shelley Jensen	Phil Beauman	January 25, 1995	456852	3.5
Marlon auditions for a modeling job with Shawn being the one that actually gets a job instead.
4	4	"Free Wally"	John Bowab	Adam Markowitz	February 1, 1995	456854	3.0
Marlon's constant interference pushes Lisa too far, so Marlon goes overboard to make it up to her and Shawn by sending them on a ferry cruise on the harbor.
5	5	"My Fair Marlon"	John Bowab	David Wyatt	February 8, 1995	456856	4.1
The woman of Marlon's dreams loves poetry, so he gets Shawn to help him write her love poems. However, things turn sour when Lisa discovers the poems and thinks Shawn is cheating on her. At a restaurant, Marlon confronts his new lady friend about this and realizes that she is only in love with the words, not him as a person. Insulted, he leaves. Shawn tries to patch things up between her and Marlon, but she instead pines over him for his poetry, kissing him as Lisa arrives with a friend. Lisa confronts Shawn about cheating on him and when he asks the woman to say she was with Marlon, she coldly replies that she doesn't know a Marlon. Marlon overhears this and gets insulted even more, yelling at her for pretending he doesn't even exist. Validating Shawn's claims, Lisa apologizes and gets back together with Shawn, after they properly pie the shallow woman for her ego.
6	6	"Pops Moves In"	Rob Schiller	Adam Markowitz	February 15, 1995	456857	3.2
Pops moves with Shawn and Marlon after by getting kicked out by the boy's mother taking advice from his sons.
7	7	"Afro Cab"	Rob Schiller	David Wyatt	February 22, 1995	456858	3.0
Marlon fools Shawn into thinking that his cab service is successful, when its really not. Until, Shawn quits his delivery job to join Marlon.
8	8	"The Shawn-Shank Redemption"	John Bowab	Matt Ember	March 1, 1995	456855	3.4
Shawn and Marlon end up in jail for unpaid parking tickets.
9	9	"ER"	Shelley Jensen	Matt Ember	March 15, 1995	456860	3.4
After accidentally sitting on a staple gun, Marlon is rushed to the hospital using Shawn's healthcare card. But the doctor that treats him is Lisa's father, Dr. Saunders (Richard Roundtree). Marlon must now pretend to be Shawn so Shawn's relationship with Lisa isn't ruined.
10	10	"The Poppa-Cabana"	Joel Zwick	Phil Beauman	March 22, 1995	456861	3.2
Shawn and Marlon turn Pop's diner into nightclub while he is away in Atlantic City with brother Leon (Garrett Morris).
11	11	"It's Shawn! It's Marlon! It's Superboys!"	Joel Zwick	David Wyatt	May 3, 1995	456862	2.5
Shawn and Marlon's apartment complex is beginning to fall apart. They meet with the landlord, Mr. Stone (Sherman Hemsley), who manipulates them into becoming apartment managers. The complex is soon in worse shape. When Mr. Stone visits the building, he yells at them for doing such a poor job. Mr. Stone fires Shawn and Marlon and takes over as superintendent.
12	12	"Pulp Marlon"	Rob Schiller	Phil Beauman	May 10, 1995	456859	2.4
Marlon becomes involved with Mia (Paula Jai Parker), a woman who happens to be the wife of a hit man. Note: Paula Jai Parker makes her first appearance in the series. She would later join the cast as Monique in season 2. Lela Rochon makes her final appearance as Lisa.
13	13	"Brazilla vs. Rodney"	Shelley Jensen	Charleen Easton & Kurt Schindler	May 24, 1995	456863	2.7
Shawn decides to get in the children's party entertainment business, with a less-than enthusiastic Marlon dressed in a costume.

=== Season 2 (1995–96) ===
No. overall	No. in season	Title	Directed by	Written by	Original release date	Prod. code	Viewers (millions)
14	1	"Shawn Takes a New Stand"	Shelley Jensen	Rick Hawkins	September 6, 1995	457701	4.0
Shawn borrows money from Pops to buy a newsstand in a public building after the owner dies. Note: Paula Jai Parker and Jill Tasker both join the cast as Monique and Lou, respectively.
15	2	"Fatal Subtraction"	Shelley Jensen	Devon Shepard	September 13, 1995	457702	3.3
Shawn's new girlfriend Rachel (Garcelle Beauvais) gives him expensive gifts but is a domineering type. Note: Garcelle Beauvais would star later on the fellow WB sitcom The Jamie Foxx Show, which premiered a year later after The Wayans Bros. on the same night that aired on Wednesdays.
16	3	"Blood is Thicker Than Watercolor"	Gerren Keith	Phil Beauman	September 20, 1995	457703	3.7
An art critic likes Marlon's less-than artistic paintings.
17	4	"Two Men and a Baby"	Glenn Casale	Maiya Williams	September 27, 1995	457705	4.4
A woman leaves a baby on Shawn and Marlon's doorstep, with one of the brothers possibly being the child's father.
18	5	"Loot"	Glenn Casale	Jim Evering	October 4, 1995	457706	4.6
Shawn, Marlon, Pops and friends find $100,000 in a garbage bag.
19	6	"The Liar's Club"	Glenn Casale	Maiya Williams	October 11, 1995	457708	4.3
Marlon becomes jealous when Monique asks Shawn to pretend to be her husband to impress a visiting ex-boyfriend from college.
20	7	"Scared Straight"	Glenn Casale	Vince Cheung & Ben Montanio	October 25, 1995	457707	4.8
Shawn and Marlon scoff at Pops about a spirit that haunts the Neidermeyer Building every Halloween.
21	8	"Head of State"	Glenn Casale	Liz Sage	November 8, 1995	457709	5.0
Everyone is excited that President may stop by to use the bathroom at Pop's diner. Marlon is determined to shake the President's hand believing that exact moment will guarantee a positive future for him. Note: Anna Maria Horsford makes her first appearance as Dee Baxter, staying for the remainder of the series. She replaces Lou (Jill Tasker) as the security guard in the Neidermeyer Building.
22	9	"The Sting"	Tony Singletary	Xavier R. Cook & Devon Shepard	November 15, 1995	457710	4.6
Shawn bets the newsstand in a poker game, eventually losing to T.C. (Phill Lewis).
23	10	"Think Fast"	Leonard R. Garner Jr.	Linda M. Yearwood	November 22, 1995	457704	3.5
Marlon quits the family basketball team due to Pops' tough coaching tactics. Note: In production order, this episode marks Jill Tasker's final appearance as Lou. She was already replaced by Anna Maria Horsford in the episode "Head of State".
24	11	"Farmer's Daughter"	Tony Singletary	Maiya Williams	November 29, 1995	457712	4.0
Shawn and Marlon make over their visiting farm cousin Sheila (Kim Wayans) to a hip hop beauty. Note: Paula Jai Parker makes her final appearance as Monique; Kim Wayans also co-starred with Shawn and Marlon on In Living Color.
25	12	"Psycho Santa"	Tony Singletary	Phil Beauman	December 20, 1995	457713	5.5
An insane man dressed as Santa Claus (Barney Martin) holds the gang hostage.
26	13	"Getting It"	Tony Singletatry	Manny Basanese	January 10, 1996	457711	5.0
Shawn begins to question his morals when he becomes sexually attracted to Amy (Tammy Townsend), a church-going woman who is keeping her virginity safe until marriage.
27	14	"Who's In Charge Here?"	Tony Singletary	Barry Gold	January 31, 1996	457716	4.3
While Pops enjoys being sick in bed, White Mike (Mitch Mullany) turns the diner to a health food spot.
28	15	"The Odd Couples"	John Sgueglia	Manny Basanese	February 7, 1996	457715	3.9
After an argument with Shawn, Marlon moves in with White Mike and T.C. moves in with Shawn to take Marlon's place.
29	16	"Hearts and Flowers"	Buzz Sapien	Maiya Williams	February 14, 1996	457718	4.2
Shawn asks out two women for Valentine's Day. However, he is left heartbroken when one cancels on him and the other one leaves him for Marlon.
30	17	"The Ghetto Gourmets"	Buzz Sapien	Devon Shepard	February 21, 1996	457714	4.5
Pops is invited to a cooking segment on a Regis and Kathie Lee-type morning show.
31	18	"A Hero's Story"	Tony Singletary	Carrie Honigblum & Renee Phillips	February 28, 1996	457717	3.9
Marlon takes credit from Shawn for saving a boy's life after the boy is hit a by a car.
32	19	"It Takes a Thief"	Scott Baio	Alison Taylor	March 13, 1996	457721	4.6
Shawn and Marlon try to expose a smooth-talking jewelry salesman who is dating Dee, until Dee announces that they are getting married.
33	20	"New Lease on Life"	Gerren Keith	Xavier R. Cook	May 1, 1996	457719	3.7
Mrs. Neidermeyer (Adrienne Barbeau) the wife of Mr. Neidermeyer (Pat Harrington Jr.) the owner of the building named after him tries to seduce Shawn.
34	21	"Mama, I Wanna Act"	Gerren Keith	Devon Shepard	May 8, 1996	457722	4.1
Marlon decides he wants to pursue an acting career much to Shawn's dislike.
35	22	"Trial and Error"	Buzz Sapien	Phil Beauman	May 15, 1996	457720	3.9
Marlon takes Shawn to small claims court after slipping on Shawn's spilled coffee and breaking his leg.

=== Season 3 (1996–97) ===
No. overall	No. in season	Title	Directed by	Written by	Original release date	Prod. code	Viewers (millions)
36	1	"Grandma's in the Hiz-House"	Gerren Keith	Phil Kellard & Tom Moore	September 4, 1996	466101	5.1
Grandma Ellington (Ja'net Dubois) stays over at Shawn and Marlon's apartment cramping their style.
37	2	"Unbrotherly Love"	Scott Baio	Josh Goldstein	September 11, 1996	466102	4.7
Shawn's new girlfriend Vanessa (Monica Calhoun) becomes more attracted to Marlon.
38	3	"Movin' On Up"	Scott Baio	Maiya Williams	September 18, 1996	466103	4.3
Shawn deserts his friends after getting a job on Wall Street.
39	4	"Gots to Have a J.O.B."	Glynn Turman	Xavier R. Cook & Devon Shepard	September 25, 1996	466104	4.2
A liquor commercial that Marlon stars in offends the African-American community.
40	5	"Trippin'"	Rae Kraus	Buddy Johnson	October 2, 1996	466105	4.3
Shawn, Pops and Grandma compete to get Marlon's second ticket for a vacation for two.
41	6	"Drama for Yo' Mama"	Scott Baio	Xavier R. Cook	October 9, 1996	466106	6.6
Shawn and Marlon create a fake story to win $5,000 to buy Dee's mother a chair.
42	7	"Family Business"	Glynn Turman	Phil Beauman	October 16, 1996	466107	6.0
Pops' brother Nate (Antonio Fargas) parks his new lunch truck across the street from the diner, stealing Pops' customers.
43	8	"An Officer and a Homegirl"	Buzz Sapien	Maiya Williams	November 6, 1996	466108	5.5
Dee's sister Natalie (Devika Parikh) wants to forget about her Air Force career to be with Marlon, much to Dee's dislike.
44	9	"The Return of the Temptones"	Gary Halvorson	Robert Bruce	November 13, 1996	466109	4.7
Pops reunites his old music group, The Temptones.
45	10	"Going to the Net"	Gary Halvorson	Dennis Snee	November 20, 1996	466110	5.0
Shawn falls for an older woman named Erica (Pam Grier). Meanwhile, Marlon dates a young thrill-seeker.
46	11	"Do the Wrong Thing"	Rae Kraus	Robert Bruce	November 27, 1996	466111	4.4
Shawn becomes Marlon's agent and demands that he gets full-star treatment in all his projects.
47	12	"Boyz in the Woods"	Glynn Turman	Phil Beauman	January 8, 1997	466112	5.29
Pops plans a getaway in the woods with his sons, until Shawn and Marlon invite their friends for a party.
48	13	"Life Without Marlon"	Terri McCoy	Xavier R. Cook	January 15, 1997	466113	4.95
In this It's a Wonderful Life-inspired episode, a guardian angel that resembles Shawn shows Marlon what life would've been like without him.
49	14	"Unusual Suspects"	Buzz Sapien	Buddy Johnson	January 22, 1997	466114	5.32
Marlon accuses T.C. of robbing the apartment.
50	15	"Goodbye Mr. Gibbs"	John Bowab	Josh Goldstein	January 29, 1997	466117	5.10
Shawn plans to pull a prank on his old junior high teacher Mr. Gibbs, until the man drops dead at his retirement party.
51	16	"Risky Bid-ness"	Terri McCoy	Robert Bruce	February 5, 1997	466116	4.58
Shawn gets a new job at an advertisement agency with everything going well until his boss Ted (Jack Plotnick) begins stealing his ideas.
52	17	"Pops' Secret"	Glynn Turman	Maiya Williams	February 12, 1997	466115	4.60
Shawn and Marlon suspect that Pops is seeing another woman.
53	18	"I Do..."	John Bowab	Maiya Williams	February 19, 1997	466119	5.20
A street hustler (Bernie Mac) demands that Marlon propose to his sister (Melissa De Sousa) after seeing how serious their relationship has become.
54	19	"Dee's Baby Daddy"	Joel Zwick	Maiya Williams	February 26, 1997	466118	3.24
After helping a woman deliver a baby in the lobby, Dee's maternal instincts kicks in with her deciding to have a child and requesting that Shawn be the father.
55	20	"The Black Widower"	Buzz Sapien	Robert Bruce & Buddy Johnson	April 30, 1997	466121	3.85
Shawn and Marlon fear for Grandma's life thinking that her latest beau Fred (Bill Cobbs) is a serial killer nicknamed "The Black Widower".
56	21	"Say It Ain't So, Marlon"	Buzz Sapien	Dennis Snee	May 7, 1997	466120	5.50
Marlon tries to outdo a former little league rival (Kenny Lofton).
57	22	"Marlon Goes On the Road"	Glynn Turman	Xavier R. Cook & Devon Shepard	May 14, 1997	466122	4.14
Marlon gets a part in traveling nationwide play with R&B singer Keith Sweat, just when Shawn has plans to expand the newsstand.

=== Season 4 (1997–98) ===
No. overall	No. in season	Title	Directed by	Written by	Original release date	Prod. code	Viewers (millions)
58	1	"Marlon's Return"	John Bowab	Phil Kellard & Tom Moore	September 17, 1997	466402	4.79
Marlon returns from his musical tour with an inflated ego and debt to match.
59	2	"Prom Fright"	John Bowab	Xavier R. Cook	September 24, 1997	466401	4.91
Shawn tries to reunite with a woman that stood him up at his high school prom, believing that she is the reason for all his subsequent bad relationships. Note: At the end of the episode, Shawn reprises his role as DJ SW-1 for the first time since the sketch comedy TV series In Living Color.
60	3	"Pops' Daughter"	John Bowab	Josh Goldstein	October 1, 1997	466404	6.10
A woman named Donna (Tembi Locke) claims that Pops is her biological father.
61	4	"Stand Up Guy"	John Bowab	Phil Beauman	October 8, 1997	466403	4.71
Marlon takes an interest in stand up comedy, but his routine offends his family members.
62	5	"Unspoken Token"	John Bowab	Buddy Johnson	October 15, 1997	466405	5.21
Shawn is thrilled to be hired by a high-tech company, only to learn that he was only hired to fill the company's racial quota. He then dreams that he is J.J. Evans on the television sitcom Good Times.
63	6	"Odd Man Out"	John Bowab	Robert Bruce	October 22, 1997	466406	5.63
Marlon learns that Shawn's old friend Terrell (Casey Lee) is a deadbeat and plans on not giving back any of the money he borrowed from Shawn. Note: Casey Lee had worked with the Wayans brothers as a DJ on the sketch comedy series In Living Color.
64	7	"Pops' Last Hurrah"	Buzz Sapien	Robert Bruce	November 5, 1997	466407	4.73
A misunderstanding leads Shawn and Marlon to believe that Pops is dying.
65	8	"I Was En Vogue's Love Slave"	Glynn Turman	Josh Goldstein	November 12, 1997	466408	5.77
Marlon is sued for fabricating a story involving himself and the R&B group En Vogue.
66	9	"Can I Get a Witness?"	Glynn Turman	Buddy Johnson	November 19, 1997	466409	5.79
The family is put in police protection after Marlon identifies a robber in a police lineup and in turn causes the robber to send his brother after the family.
67	10	"Ted's Revenge"	Buzz Sapien	Maiya Williams	December 10, 1997	466410	5.38
Ted (Jack Plotnick), Shawn's old boss returns after serving a stint in a mental institution and wants to be friends with him, much to Shawn's dislike.
68	11	"All in the Family Feud"	Erma Elzy-Jones	Kenny Buford	January 14, 1998	466414	5.00
Shawn and Pops replace dimwitted Marlon with "cousin" Dee to win in the game show "Family Battle" (a parody of Family Feud).
69	12	"Raging Marlon"	John Bowab	Phil Beauman & Craig Wayans	January 21, 1998	466411	5.35
Champion boxer Héctor Camacho challenges Marlon to a boxing match, after Marlon bragged that he knocked him out cold with a sucker punch.
70	13	"The Son of Marlon"	Aaron Speiser	Maiya Williams	January 28, 1998	466412	4.87
Marlon begins dating a woman with a seven-year-old son.
71	14	"Dee's Deelemma"	Buzz Sapien	Josh Goldstein	February 4, 1998	466413	5.2
Dee starts to think that her dentist boyfriend is romantically shy.
72	15	"Independence Day"	Ted Lange	Buddy Johnson	February 11, 1998	466415	5.19
Marlon's dream deluxe apartment is a nightmare, after he signs a ten-year lease.
73	16	"Help a Brother Out"	John Bowab	Maiya Williams	February 18, 1998	466418	4.26
Marlon studies a homeless man named Reggie (Lawrence Hilton-Jacobs), to prepare for an acting role.
74	17	"The Rich Girl"	John Bowab	Xavier R. Cook	February 25, 1998	466417	4.31
Shawn is afraid his family will embarrass him in front of his new rich girlfriend Tanya (Elise Neal).
75	18	"Busta Saves the Day"	John Bowab	Phil Beauman	March 4, 1998	466419	6.38
Shawn and Marlon are caught scalping tickets for a Busta Rhymes concert and then plead with the rapper to perform at Dee's church to prevent it from closing down.
76	19	"Talk is Cheap"	Buzz Sapien	Robert Bruce & Buddy Johnson	April 29, 1998	466420	6.04
Shawn and Marlon appear on The Jerry Springer Show and learn that they have both been dating the same woman.
77	20	"Bringing It All Back Home"	John Bowab	Robert Bruce	May 6, 1998	466416	4.51
Shawn and Marlon try to scare away potential buyers after Pops decides to sell their old childhood home.
78	21	"Recipe for Success"	Fred Parker	Maiya Williams	May 13, 1998	466421	4.83
Shawn and Marlon try to warn Pops that the Chili he is entering in a festival contains dog food.
79	22	"Fire!"	John Bowab	Xavier R. Cook	May 20, 1998	466422	3.88
Shawn feels the heat after a crooked accountant leaves him awash in debt. Then the newsstand suddenly burns down and all of his problems seem to be solved -- until he and the family are suspected of arson.

=== Season 5 (1998–99) ===
No. overall	No. in season	Title	Directed by	Written by	Original release date	Prod. code	Viewers (millions)
80	1	"Brother Can You Spare a Dime?"	John Bowab	Phil Kellard & Tom Moore	September 17, 1998	467951	3.51
Shawn puts his pride aside and asks Marlon for a loan to rebuild the newsstand.
81	2	"Six Degrees of Marlon"	John Bowab	Maiya Williams	September 24, 1998	467952	2.00
Shawn accidentally arranges for Marlon to have a kissing scene on his new sitcom "Everybody Loves Everybody", but the scene is with a guy.
82	3	"Pops' Campaign"	John Bowab	Robert Bruce	October 1, 1998	467953	3.27
Pops runs for city council against a corrupt politician (Ronnie Schell).
83	4	"Romeo & J'Leeta"	John Bowab	Phil Beauman	October 8, 1998	467954	4.03
Shawn falls for J'Leeta (Tracey Cherelle Jones) the daughter of Pop's long-time restaurant rival Rick (Earl Billings).
84	5	"Ho's on First"	Buzz Sapien	Xavier R. Cook	October 15, 1998	467956	3.44
Shawn has a hard time telling Marlon that his new girlfriend Angel (Angelle Brooks) has had a sexually promiscuous past.
85	6	"Escorting Ain't Easy"	John Bowab	Mitchell Marchand & Craig Wayans	October 29, 1998	467958	2.92
Shawn and Marlon gets Pops involved in their new male escort business with Pops reuniting with Susan Sparks (Chip Fields), an old flame.
86	7	"The Kiss"	John Bowab	Phil Beauman & Tom Bryant	November 5, 1998	467957	3.76
Shawn and Dee go to a Missy Elliott concert together. The next day, they are in bed together, believing that they had sex, or did they?...
87	8	"The High Life"	John Bowab	Robert Bruce	November 12, 1998	467960	3.80
Inspired to be like his favorite actor Rico Da Vinci (Nick Spano), Marlon smokes marijuana and ends up ruining an acting audition that Shawn set up for him.
88	9	"Misery"	Buzz Sapien	Xavier R. Cook	November 19, 1998	467959	3.06
In this episode that parodies the film Misery, Marlon is trapped in the house of a crazed fan named Phyllis (Kym Whitley).
89	10	"Marlon Joins a Cult"	John Bowab	Buddy Johnson	December 10, 1998	467955	3.48
Marlon is fooled into joining a cult thinking it is an acting seminar. Note: Kelly Coffield guest starred in this episode; she had been a cast member on In Living Color with Shawn and Marlon Wayans. She also co-starred with the Wayans brothers and John Witherspoon in the 2006 film Little Man. Also, this is Gary Coleman's second appearance on the show, the first being the pilot episode "Goop-Hair-It-Is".
90	11	"A Country Christmas"	Buzz Sapien	Maiya Williams	December 17, 1998	467961	3.73
Cousin Sheila (Kim Wayans) invites the family to stay at the farm for the holidays. They then learn that she is in financial trouble.
91	12	"Green Card"	Buzz Sapien	Buddy Johnson	January 14, 1999	467962	4.52
When Shawn decides to marry an immigrant (JoNell Kennedy) so she can be granted citizenship, the woman must live with him for six months. But he soon comes to regret the decision after the woman invites other family members to move in.
92	13	"Big Brother"	John Bowab	Phil Beauman & Craig Wayans	January 21, 1999	467963	4.69
Shawn and Marlon take part in a Big Brother, Little Brother program until the big brother in the program is accused of stealing the newsstand money and The little brother confesses to stealing the money.
93	14	"Saving Private Marlon"	Buzz Sapien	Charlie Bonomo & Buddy Johnson	January 28, 1999	467964	4.07
In an attempt to do research for a role in a war film, Marlon visits an army base and accidentally signs up for the actual army.
94	15	"Jump!"	John Bowab	Maiya Williams	February 4, 1999	467966	4.39
Shawn and Marlon's teasing about Dee's job habits gets her fired.
95	16	"Pops Gets Evicted"	Aaron Speiser	Eric Monte	February 11, 1999	467965	4.12
Shawn is hired to come up with new ideas for the Neidermeyer Building lobby. But his new ideas also involve removing Pops' diner.
96	17	"Crazy 4 You"	Phil Kellard	Robert Bruce	February 18, 1999	467968	3.4
Marlon and Shawn compete for the attention of Dawn (Shari Headley), an attractive psychiatrist who is new to the Neidermeyer Building.
97	18	"Hip Hop Pops"	John Bowab	Esa Lewis	February 25, 1999	467967	4.20
Pops has a hip hop makeover for his 50th birthday.
98	19	"Everybody Loves Shawn"	John Bowab	Phil Beauman & Buddy Johnson	April 29, 1999	467971	3.33
Shawn gets a guest spot on "Everybody Loves Everybody" taking the spotlight away from Marlon.
99	20	"Dream Girl"	John Bowab	Maiya Williams	May 6, 1999	467969	3.11
Sasha (Paula Abdul), a famous singer asks Shawn to father her a child, but not be in the baby's life.
100	21	"Three on the Couch"	Marlon Wayans	Robert Bruce	May 13, 1999	467970	3.07
After meeting up with a successful old friend, Shawn blames his family for holding him back in life. Note: This episode is a clip show of past episodes.
101	22	"Rope-a-Dope"	John Bowab	Phil Beauman & Buddy Johnson	May 20, 1999	467972	2.25
Pops is upset at Shawn and Marlon for selling his old boxing memorabilia. They then find out the new owner is champion boxer Roy Jones Jr.
