= Peter and the Wolf (TV special) =

1995 live-action/animated TV special

- DVD cover
- Based on: Peter and the Wolf by Sergei Prokofiev
- Written by: George Daugherty; Janis Diamond
- Directed by: George Daugherty; Jean Flynn
- Starring: Kirstie Alley; Lloyd Bridges; Ross Malinger
- Music by: Cameron Patrick
- Country of origin: United States
- Original language: English

Production
- Executive producers: George Daugherty; David Ka Lik Wong
- Producers: Linda Jones Clough; Christopher Kulikowski; Adrian Workman
- Cinematography: David E. West
- Editor: Joel Goodman
- Running time: 48 minutes
- Production companies: IF/X Productions; Cosgrove Hall Films

Original release
- Network: ABC
- Release: December 8, 1995

Peter and the Wolf is a 1995 live-action/animated television special based on the 1936 musical composition/fairy tale of the same name by Sergei Prokofiev, and directed by American conductor George Daugherty. It first aired Friday, December 8, 1995, on ABC in the United States. The music for this special was performed by the RCA Victor Symphony Orchestra conducted by Daugherty.

The main characters that appear in the animated sequences that intervene the live-action ones, are designed by cartoonist Chuck Jones, who also serves as the special's executive consultant.

== Plot ==
Annie and her son, Peter, get a very warm welcome by his grandfather, also named Peter, as they arrive at his house. Later, in the dining room, Annie and Peter discuss their hectic daily routine in Los Angeles with the grandfather. As the conversation goes on, he realizes how little time Peter and his mother spend together, and considers "rectifying" things. It ends with Annie explaining to him how the city can become a scary place. Next, she opens the window and talks to Peter about how the meadow outside used to be her playground, and the "friends" she had with there. The grandfather recollects an event that happened once in that meadow, which Annie starts narrating to Peter.

On the first day of Spring, Peter goes into the meadow to visit his friend, the bird, leaving the garden gate open. The bird is incubating six eggs. While they play together, the duck that lives in the yard takes the opportunity and also goes out, as it's been a long winter for him and he wants to have a "real swim". As the duck starts swimming in a pond nearby, he argues with the bird ("What kind of bird are you if you can't fly?" – "What kind of bird are you if you can't swim?"). Peter's pet cat stalks them quietly, and the bird—warned by Peter—flies away. The cat then aims for the duck, but doesn't manage to catch it either. Peter's grandfather scolds him for being outside in the meadow alone ("What if a wolf came out of the forest all of a sudden?"), and takes him back into the house.

In response to Peter's comment ("But what could happen anyway, with a cat, a duck and stupid little bird?"), Annie continues narrating the story. Soon afterwards "a big, grey wolf" does indeed come out of the forest. The cat quickly climbs into a tree, but the duck, who is in the pond, is overtaken, and swallowed by the wolf.

Peter fetches a rope and climbs over the garden wall, so he can go outside and climb the tree. He asks the bird to fly around the wolf's head to distract him. The wolf gets exhausted, and Peter slowly lowers a noose and catches the wolf by his tail. The wolf struggles to get free, but Peter ties the rope to the tree and the noose only gets tighter.

Some hunters, who have been tracking the wolf, come out of the forest ready to shoot. The wolf gets scared, and pops the swallowed duck alive, out of his mouth. He starts dancing as the wolf is being captured. The hunters are about to shoot either one of the two, but Peter tells not to shoot either of them. Shortly after, the wolf, described as "not a ballet fan", grabs the duck again before being forced to drop him by the hunters. Peter gets them to create a cage for the wolf and help him take it to a zoo. What follows is a victory parade, that includes himself, the bird, the hunters leading the wolf, the cat, and his Grandfather, who in this version, ends up congratulating Peter. The female bird's eggs also hatch.

As the story ends, Peter finds the duck crouching at the pond's edge, shivering and frightened because of his terrible experience, and Peter reassures it that he will always be there to protect him.

Peter starts doubting that the story actually happened. His grandfather shows him the clothes he was wearing that day. Peter then gets excited, and starts wearing them. The special ends with Peter going outside in the meadow (in a mixture of live-action with animation), where he also finds the cat, the duck, and the bird from the story.

== Cast and characters ==
- Kirstie Alley as Annie: Peter's mother in the live-action segments. She is described as conservative at the beginning of the special, as to Peter's life alongside her in Los Angeles. During the special, it's revealed that in the meadow outside the house, she was playing with the animals, which were the only friends of her, and she narrates the story that unfolds during the animated segments.
  - She also voices the following animals in the animated sequences: a bird that's "heroic," a cat that's "playful and a bit of a coward," and a duck that’s “deliriously dizzy”.
- Ross Malinger as Peter: Annie's son. In this special, he visits alongside her mother, his same-named Grandfather, who tries to "rectify" things by prompting him to do stuff he can't in Los Angeles, and thus, "discover what life is all about."
- Lloyd Bridges as Grandfather: Peter's same-named grandfather. In the special, he tries to make Peter "feel free to explore all the wonderful things around him," and starts recalling in the beginning of the special, the adventure he embarked on when he was a little boy. He married with his wife in the meadow.
  - He also voices Peter's grandfather in the animated sequences.
- George Daugherty voices the "ominous" wolf.
- David Ka Lik Wong voices the hunters.

== Production ==
"Long before I was a director and a writer, I was a conductor and a musician. And Peter and the Wolf was the first piece of music I ever conducted, way back when I was 14 years old. I've loved this piece of music ever since I was a little kid. And so for me, it's all come full circle now."

— George Daugherty

The initial development of the special can be traced back in 1992, when Chuck Jones and George Daugherty (who conducted Bugs Bunny on Broadway and composed several 90s Looney Tunes shorts) formed Impossible Productions, a studio based in Los Angeles, to create a special based on the Peter and the Wolf composition.

The final special was produced in association with Chuck Jones Enterprises, responsible for animation development and pre-production, and ITEL. IF/X Productions was responsible for the live-action and special effects production unit. The animation was produced at Cosgrove Hall Films. Daugherty said that "... we wanted to find an animation company that could take Chuck's brilliant characters and realize them in a way that, was in keeping with the traditions that he had established over the course of his sixty-year career." Jean Flynn, the animation director, noted how the special would be mostly "based on music," in contrast with other animated films at the time, which made the animation production, in order to comply with the composition's pacing, a difficult process. In response to the animation being outsourced, Jones said:

It's a story I always wanted to do. But I didn't do the animation for this one. I didn't direct it, either. Am I pleased? Well, I think it's very good. But I would have done it differently--every director has a different style.

— Chuck Jones, "THIS `PETER AND THE WOLF' IS NO HOWL", Chicago Tribune (April 25, 1996)

== Music ==
=== Soundtrack ===
Sergei Prokofiev: Peter and the Wolf – Full Soundtrack Recording

Soundtrack album by George Daugherty and Cameron Patrick
- Released: April 16, 1996
- Recorded: 1995 at L.A. Studios East, Salt Lake City, Utah
- Genre: Classical
- Length: 62:38
- Label: BMG; RCA Red Seal Records
- Producer: David Ka Lik Wong; Christine Losecaat

A soundtrack album was released by RCA Red Seal Records in 1996. It was re-released by Sony Masterworks. In Canada, it was released in May 1997.

=== Track listing ===
Tracks 1–16 are used from the animated segments and have Kirstie Alley's narration. Tracks 17–31 are performances of the music without narration, and the rest is used from the live-action ones, without dialogue.

No.	Title	Length
1.	"Introduction"	4:18
2.	"Peter and the Meadow"	0:57
3.	"Peter and the Bird"	1:31
4.	"The Duck"	2:35
5.	"The Cat"	1:53
6.	"Grandfather"	2:03
7.	"The Wolf"	1:04
8.	"The Cat was the first one in the meadow to notice the Wolf..."	1:46
9.	"Here's how things stood in the meadow..."	1:29
10.	"Peter sprang into action..."	3:00
11.	"Peter tugged on the rope... (The Battle)"	1:23
12.	"The Hunters"	1:39
13.	"The Duck's Ballet (Valse)"	0:56
14.	"Peter takes charge"	1:35
15.	"Grandfather reappears"	0:58
16.	"The Grand Parade"	1:51
17.	"Part 1"	0:56
18.	"Part 2"	1:25
19.	"Part 3"	2:17
20.	"Part 4"	1:49
21.	"Part 5"	1:47
22.	"Part 6"	1:04
23.	"Part 7"	1:43
24.	"Part 8"	1:25
25.	"Part 9"	2:31
26.	"Part 10"	1:31
27.	"Part 11"	1:11
28.	"Part 12"	0:33
29.	"Part 13"	1:55
30.	"Part 14"	0:19
31.	"Part 15"	1:50
32.	"Main Title"	1:27
33.	"Grandfather's Morning"	0:34
34.	"The Reunion"	1:23
35.	"Taxi Driver"	0:24
36.	"Peter and Grandfather"	1:27
37.	"The Meadow"	1:26
38.	"A Familiar Ring"	0:43
39.	"The Story"	0:39
40.	"I Am Peter"	1:04
41.	"The Little Yellow Suit"	0:30
42.	"Grandfather's Memories"	1:25
43.	"Peter's Adventure and Finale"	0:12
Total length:		62:38

== Release ==
The special was released on March 19, 1996, on VHS, by Malofilm Video and BMG Video. It also had a "special edition" release on LaserDisc by Image Entertainment in 1997. The LaserDisc release also includes concept art and animatic and storyboard segments, and interviews with Chuck Jones, George Daughterty and the main cast of the film. In November 2003, it was released on DVD (regions 1, 2 and 5), VHS (NTSC) and VCD (distributed by Alliance Entertainment Singapore Pte. Ltd.) by Columbia TriStar Home Entertainment. The DVD features an educational match game about animals and instruments that isn't related to the special. The latter release was praised by reviewers who recommended it for young children. In Australia, the film was released on VHS by 21st Century Pictures in 1996, and Columbia TriStar in 2004.

Beyond the Meadow, a documentary on the making of the film, directed by Casey Bridges, and The Music of Peter and the Wolf, an educational short about the symphony orchestra hosted by Julia Glander, are featured in both the LaserDisc and DVD releases.

In Norway, the film was released on VHS, by Svensk Filmindustri, with the dub starring Tor Stokke, Minken Fosheim and Nils-Martin Crawfurd. The version of the special in this release differs from the 2003 Columbia TriStar one, in terms of the opening BMG logo, in which the "Video" subtext is absent, as well as the smaller size of the letters in the opening and ending credits, and "The End" text.

== Reception ==
=== Ratings ===
Based on a 13.2/37 rating/share according to Nielsen, among 2-to-11-year-old children, Peter and the Wolf was the first primetime program with children for the week of December 4, 1995.

=== Critical reception ===
Jonathan Storm of The Philadelphia Inquirer was positive in his review, calling the production "one of the best children's shows in years." He particularly praised the animal characters and Alley's narration. Lynne Heffley of Los Angeles Times regarded it as "a refreshing break for a good amount of children's entertainment that's heavy on attitude." The special also received noteworthy praise by Kirk Nicewonger of United Features Syndicate, The San Francisco Examiner, The Hollywood Reporter, The Louisville Courier Journal, Chicago Tribune, The Harrisburg Patriot, The Indianapolis Star and Vårt Land.

Scott Blakey in another review by Chicago Tribune called the special "a missed opportunity," as well as too "cute and overdone" for the most part. He referred to the script as "bloated" and criticized Alley's narration. It was also noted that the animation was outsourced to another company, instead of being done by Chuck Jones himself.

=== Award and nominations ===
The special received a 1996 Primetime Emmy Award for Outstanding Children's Program and received a second Emmy nomination for Daugherty, for Outstanding Music Direction. Daugherty (also one of the writers) and Janis Diamond received a Writers Guild of America Award nomination for the script. The production received a Gold Hugo and Silver Hugo at Chicago International Film Festival. It also received a Parents' Choice award, an Award of Excellence from the Film Advisory Board and a WorldFest-Houston grand award for best television production. It's also approved by Kids First and The Dove Foundation.

== Merchandise ==
A year prior the special's release, Time Warner would publish a series of merchandising developed by IF/X Interactive, entitled Chuck Jones' Peter and the Wolf, utilizing the animated sequences of the special. An interactive CD-ROM was published by Time Warner Interactive for Windows 3.1 and Macintosh computers with System 7 or higher, featuring a "log jam game," concept art, educational media about the symphony orchestra and the musical instruments (such as video performances by students from the Colburn School of the Performing Arts, also included in The Music of Peter and the Wolf featurette), and screen documentaries of Chuck Jones and Sergei Prokofiev. The animated sequences differ from the ones in the special, as the narration done by Kirstie Alley differs, and the character design for Peter resembles more the one found in initial concept arts for the special. The music was performed by the Time Warner Symphony Orchestra. In the CD-ROM's package, there was an additional CD featuring a version with the narration and music alone, and another one with just the music. Reviews of the CD-ROM were generally favorable. Ty Burr of Entertainment Weekly praised the Chuck Jones animation and the educational orchestra section, but criticized the technical limitations of the disc, which resulted in "jerky movement and overly long pauses," and questioned the existence of the log jam game.
A deluxe hardcover book was released by Warner Books, and a read-along book and audio cassette by TW Kids, a division of Atlantic Records and Time Warner.
