= George Daugherty =

American conductor

George Daugherty (born 1955) is an American conductor, director, producer, and writer.

== Family life, education, and early career ==
Daugherty was born in Pendleton, Indiana, in 1955, the only son of George Daugherty Sr., an Indiana State Policeman who eventually became Commander of the Indiana State Police, and Charlene Elizabeth Beeson Daugherty, a teacher and educator. Although not from a musical family per se, Daugherty's ancestors included many who pursued their own artistic careers, including his great-great-great-grandfather, American poet Henry Wadsworth Longfellow.

Daugherty lived in Pendleton for his entire childhood and teenage years, and began studying piano with noted pianist Elizabeth Edmundson at the age of 4. He began cello studies in his teenage years. He attended college at Butler University's Jordan College of Music, where he studied with cellists Shirley Evans Tabachnick and Dennis McCafferty, conducting with John Colbert, and piano with Martin Marks and Frank Cooper. While at Butler, Daugherty also pursued a double major in journalism, and was the recipient of the prestigious Eugene Collins Pulliam / Hilton U. Brown Journalism Scholarship to Butler. At the age of 20, Daugherty was appointed an assistant conductor of the Fort Wayne Philharmonic Orchestra, where he worked and studied under conductor/composer Thomas Bricetti. While there, he also continued his collegiate studies, having transferred from Butler to Indiana University.

In 1975 at the age of 20, he also founded his own orchestra, The Pendleton Festival Symphony, and upon securing grants from the Indiana Arts Commission and the National Endowment for the Arts, the ensemble became a professional summer festival orchestra in 1976, and continued for the next 10 years. He made his professional conducting debut with that orchestra in 1976, at the age of 21, conducting for Metropolitan Opera leading soprano Roberta Peters, who would become a mentor and good friend of the young conductor. Despite his very young age, he was able to bring an impressive array of international talent to appear under his baton at the Pendleton Festival, including violinist Eugene Fodor, Metropolitan Opera leading mezzo-soprano Rosalind Elias, international soprano Nancy Shade, the Harvard Glee Club, and ensembles of principal dancers from American Ballet Theatre, the New York City Ballet, the Royal Ballet, the National Ballet of Canada, and the Joffrey Ballet. One of his major Pendleton Festival productions, a tribute on the 100th birthday of the legendary Russian ballerina Anna Pavlova, went on to appear at New York's Lincoln Center Festival, and became a Canadian Broadcasting Company television special starring Leslie Caron and an international cast of dancers.

In 1977, Daugherty was accepted as an advanced opera conducting student at the University of Cincinnati College-Conservatory of Music, where he studied conducting and opera coaching/accompanying with conductor Kelly Hale, and studied opera repertoire and interpretation with famed Italian basso Italo Tajo. He left the University of Cincinnati in late 1979, when he had the unexpected opportunity to begin conducting for American Ballet Theatre prima ballerina Gelsey Kirkland, which eventually resulted in a position with ABT itself. His major symphony orchestra conducting debut took place in that same year, in November 1979, with his first performance with the Rochester Philharmonic Orchestra in the Eastman Theatre.

== Current career ==
Daugherty has conducted international ballet companies and most of America's major symphony orchestras, and has continuing guest conducting relationships with the Cleveland Orchestra, with whom he performs both in Severance Hall and at the Blossom Festival, the Philadelphia Orchestra, the Los Angeles Philharmonic, at both the Hollywood Bowl and the Dorothy Chandler Pavilion, the San Francisco Symphony, the National Symphony, the Seattle Symphony, the Fort Worth Symphony, the St. Louis Symphony, the Dallas Symphony, and the Houston Symphony.

He made his conducting debut with the New York Philharmonic in May 2015, with four sold-out performances at Avery Fisher Hall at Lincoln Center for the Performing Arts. He returns to the New York Philharmonic at David Geffen Hall in May 2019. He made his debut with The Boston Pops in December 2017, at Symphony Hall. He has guest conducted virtually all of Canada's major symphony orchestras, including numerous performances with the Vancouver Symphony, Calgary Philharmonic Orchestra, Winnipeg Symphony Orchestra, National Arts Centre Orchestra, Montreal Symphony, Toronto Symphony, and Kitchener-Waterloo Symphony.

Internationally, he has conducted often at the Sydney Opera House, and with such international orchestras as the Royal Philharmonic Concert Orchestra (in London at Royal Festival Hall, and on tour in the UK, US, and Canada), the Sydney Symphony, the Melbourne Symphony, the New Japan Philharmonic, the Orchestra of the Kremlin Palace, the Danish National Symphony Orchestra during the inaugural season of the acclaimed new DR Koncerthuset, the Malaysian Philharmonic Orchestra at the Petronas Philharmonic Hall, and The RTÉ Concert Orchestra in the National Concert Hall in Dublin, Ireland.

He has guest conducted a number of major choral ensembles, including the Harvard Glee Club, The Westminster Symphonic Choir, The San Francisco Symphony Chorus, and The Westminster Concert Bell Choir. As a ballet and opera conductor, he conducted for the American Ballet Theatre, the Munich State Opera and Ballet, the Teatro Regio Torino, the Teatro Argentina Opera House of Rome, the Teatro Municipale Valli di Reggio Emilia, Mexico's Palacio de Bellas Artes and Teatro Juarez opera houses, Venezuela's Teatro Municipal opera house, as well as for ballet galas all over the world. He was Music Director of the Chicago City Ballet from 1981 to 1983, the Louisville Ballet from 1985 to 1990, and Ballet Chicago from 1987 to 1990. He has collaborated with, and conducted for, a wide range of singers, ranging from Julie Andrews to Etta James. In August 2012, he was appointed Music Director and Principal Conductor of Ballet San Jose, for whom he will conduct all 2012-2013 performances with Symphony Silicon Valley in the orchestra pit, including new productions of The Nutcracker and full-length Don Quixote, as well as such pieces of mixed repertoire as Sir Frederick Ashton's "Lez Rendez-vous" and "Thais Pas de Deux", and Clark Tippet's "Bruch Violin Concerto". In 2016, he was appointed Music Director and Principal Conductor of the iconic and legendary Les Ballets Trockadero de Monte Carlo and made his debut with the company in March 2017, in performances in the Opera House of the John F. Kennedy Center for the Performing Arts.

Since 1990, he has been notable for creating symphony orchestra concerts which combine film and multimedia with classical music, with the goal of bringing new audiences to the genre of symphony orchestra music. His most successful concert in this genre, Bugs Bunny on Broadway, and its 2010 sequel "Bugs Bunny at the Symphony", combines classic Warner Bros. Looney Tunes projected on a large screen accompanied by a live orchestra performing the original score. This production has been touring the world continuously since 1990 and has played to a total international audience of almost two million people. He has also won numerous awards as a producer, director, writer, and composer/music director for film and television, including a Primetime Emmy Award and five Emmy nominations. He has created all of his television and film projects in collaboration with producing partner David Ka Lik Wong. In addition to their professional partnership, Daugherty and Wong have been life partners since 1989, and were married in San Francisco in 2013, where they have lived for the past 15 years.

== Awards ==
Daugherty won a Primetime Emmy Award in 1996 as executive producer of Peter and the Wolf for the ABC Television Network. This new production combined live-action and animation to tell Sergei Prokofiev's musical tale, and featured animated characters designed by Warner Bros. Looney Tunes icon Chuck Jones, and vocal and live-action performances by Kirstie Alley, Lloyd Bridges, and Ross Malinger. Daugherty was also nominated for an additional Emmy for Music Direction of the production, and he and co-writer Janis Diamond received a Writers Guild of America Award nomination for its script. Peter and The Wolf also took the top prize at both the Chicago International Film Festival, and the Houston International Film Festival, and received major awards from the Parents' Choice Awards, Kids First, and the National Film Advisory Board. Daugherty's first Emmy nomination came in 1987, for Music Direction of the PBS television special of Johann Strauss' Die Fledermaus. He also received two Emmy nominations for Rhythm & Jam, his series of music education specials for the ABC Television Network. In addition, he has received many other awards for his work in music and music education, including the Indiana State Governor's Arts Award in 1999; the Sagamore of the Wabash, also awarded by the Governor of Indiana (and also awarded to his mother Charlene Daugherty for her lifelong work in education); the Honorable Order of Kentucky Colonel for his work while Music Director of the Louisville Ballet (which included over 150 performances with the Louisville Orchestra); and a Special Legislative Resolution of Recognition awarded by the Indiana State Senate. His work has also been recognized by the San Francisco Public Library, which named him a "Library Laureate" in 2006, and by the Library of Congress National Film Archives, which honored him in 2007.

== Partial filmography ==
=== Composer / music director ===
Year	Title
1980	Jerry Lewis MDA Labor Day Telethon (1980) (conductor)
1982	Pavlova: A Tribute To The Legendary Ballerina (conductor, musical director, creative consultant)
1986	Die Fledermaus (conductor, orchestrator)
1987	Christmas Every Day (composer)
1987	Blood Harvest (composer)
1988	The Canterville Ghost (composer)
1990	Merrie Melodies: Starring Bugs Bunny and Friends (1990) (composer)
1990	Britannica's Tales Around the World (1990) (composer)
1991	(Blooper) Bunny (conductor, musical director, composer)
1994	Chariots of Fur (conductor, musical director, composer)
1995	Another Froggy Evening (conductor, musical director, composer)
1995	Peter and the Wolf (conductor, musical director, off-line video editor)
1996	Superior Duck (musical director)
1997	From Hare to Eternity (musical director)

=== As producer, writer, and/or director ===
Year	Title
1992	The Magical World of Chuck Jones (producer, director)
1993	Rhythm & Jam (producer, writer, director)
1995	Peter and the Wolf (producer, writer, director)
2001	Sagwa, the Chinese Siamese Cat (producer, writer)
