= Little Bigfoot (film) =

- Film poster
- Directed by: Art Camacho
- Screenplay by: Richard Preston Jr.
- Story by: Scott McAboy
- Produced by: Don Stroud; Richard Pepin
- Starring: Ross Malinger; P.J. Soles; Kenneth Tigar; Kelly Packard; Don Stroud
- Cinematography: Ken Blakey
- Edited by: Chris Worland
- Music by: Louis Febre
- Production company: PM Entertainment Group
- Distributed by: Republic Pictures Home Video
- Release date: June 17, 1997
- Running time: 96 minutes
- Country: United States
- Language: English

Little Bigfoot is a 1997 American fantasy adventure film directed by Art Camacho. It was made by the same producers as Bigfoot: The Unforgettable Encounter and it was followed by the sequel Little Bigfoot 2: The Journey Home (1998).

== Plot ==
While on summer vacation in Cedar Lake, California with their older brother, Peter; their dog, Max; and their widowed mother, Carolyn; Payton Shoemaker and his little sister Maggie engage in an adventure to save (and secretly befriend) a young male bigfoot which they name him Bilbo (after Bilbo Baggins from The Hobbit) and his injured mother (who gets shot in her kneecap prior to the opening of the film by the hunters) from a logging company who is illegally hunting them down.

== Cast ==
- Ross Malinger as Payton
- P.J. Soles as Carolyn
- Chris Finch as Peter
- Caitlin Barrett as Maggie
- Kenneth Tigar as Largo
- Kelly Packard as Lanya
- Don Stroud as McKenzie
- Matt McCoy as Sheriff Cliffton

== Release ==
=== Reception ===
American magazine TV Guide gave the film one star out of four, stating:

LITTLE BIGFOOT turns every character into a one-note bore: the Evil Businessman, the Perky Mom, the Cute Sister, etc., all the better to piledrive its conservation message home. There's no subtlety or relief from the chest-pounding self-righteousness, as sorrowful Bilbo literally hugs the stumps of murdered redwoods.
