= Nick Freno: Licensed Teacher =

- Also known as: Nick Freno
- Genre: Sitcom
- Created by: Marc Warren; Dennis Rinsler
- Starring: Mitch Mullany; Portia de Rossi; Clinton Jackson; Ross Malinger; Jonathan Fernandez; Cara DeLizia; Arjay Smith; Kyle Gibson; Charles Cyphers; Stuart Pankin; Andrew Levitas; Christina Vidal; Blake Heron; Malinda Williams; Giuseppe Andrews; Jane Sibbett
- Theme music composer: Andrew Gross; Josh Kramon
- Composer: Josh Kramon
- Country of origin: United States
- Original language: English
- No. of seasons: 2
- No. of episodes: 43

Production
- Executive producers: Richard Gurman; Dennis Rinsler; Marc Warren
- Producers: Suzy Friendly; Gene Laufenberg; Carolyn Omine
- Cinematography: Joseph W. Calloway
- Camera setup: Multi-camera
- Running time: 22–24 minutes
- Production companies: Warren and Rinsler Productions; Warner Bros. Television

Original release
- Network: The WB
- Release: August 28, 1996 – May 3, 1998

Nick Freno: Licensed Teacher (also known as Nick Freno) is an American sitcom television series starring comedian Mitch Mullany that aired on The WB from August 28, 1996, to May 3, 1998.

The series was created and executive produced by Dennis Rinsler and Marc Warren, who drew on their own experiences as former teachers in New York City. They based the title character on their elementary school music teacher and friend, John Freno.

== Cast ==
=== Main ===
==== Tutorial staff ====
- Mitch Mullany as Nick Freno
- Portia De Rossi as Elana Lewis (1996–1997)
- Clinton Jackson as Mezz Crosby
  - Reggie Hayes as Mezz Crosby (pilot episode only)
- Charles Cyphers as Al Yaroker
- Stuart Pankin as Kurt Fust (1996–1997)
- Jane Sibbett as Dr. Katherine Emerson (1997–1998)

==== Students ====
- Ross Malinger as Tyler Hale (1996–1997)
- Jonathan Hernandez as Orlando Diaz (1996–1997)
- Cara DeLizia as Sarah (1996–1997)
- Arjay Smith as Jared (1996–1997)
- Kyle Gibson as Davey Marcucci (1996–1997)
- Andrew Levitas as Marco Romero (1997–1998)
- Christina Vidal as Sophia Del Bono (1997–1998)
- Blake Heron as Jordan Wells (1997–1998)
- Malinda Williams as Tasha Morrison (1997–1998)
- Giuseppe Andrews as Miles Novacek (1997–1998)

=== Recurring ===
- Mila Kunis as Anna-Maria Del Bono
- Sid Newman as Phil Sussman

== Series overview ==
Nick Fresno is an aspiring actor who takes a job as a substitute teacher, first at a middle school and then in the second season at a high school, until he gets his big break.

== Episodes ==
Season	Episodes	Originally released	
Season	Episodes	First released	Last released
1	22	August 28, 1996	May 11, 1997
2	21	September 7, 1997	May 3, 1998

=== Season 1 (1996–97) ===
No. overall	No. in season	Title	Directed by	Written by	Original release date	Prod. code	Viewers (millions)
1	1	"Cheap-O's"	Gerren Keith	Marc Warren & Dennis Rinsler	August 28, 1996	475110	5.4
2	2	"Me and Mrs. Hale"	Unknown	David Garrett & Carolyn Omine	September 4, 1996	465702	4.3
3	3	"Dance Fever"	John Tracy	Richey Jones & Todd Jones	September 11, 1996	465703	5.1
4	4	"Educating Nick"	Unknown	Unknown	September 18, 1996	465701	4.9
5	5	"Some Assembly Required"	Unknown	Trish Baker	September 25, 1996	465704	4.1
6	6	"The Mystery of Fust's Bust"	Unknown	Unknown	October 2, 1996	465705	4.4
7	7	"Judgement Day"	Unknown	Carolyn Omine	October 9, 1996	465706	5.4
8	8	"Leader of the Pack"	Unknown	Unknown	October 30, 1996	465709	4.0
9	9	"Freno the Deano"	Unknown	Unknown	November 6, 1996	465707	4.9
10	10	"Teacher's Pest"	Unknown	Unknown	November 13, 1996	465708	4.5
11	11	"Operation Scamtron"	Unknown	Unknown	November 20, 1996	465710	4.8
12	12	"Hot for Teacher"	Unknown	Trish Baker	November 27, 1996	465711	4.5
13	13	"Gargoyle Guys"	Unknown	Unknown	January 8, 1997	465712	4.49
14	14	"Social Security Guard"	Unknown	Carolyn Omine	January 22, 1997	465714	4.48
15	15	"Sumo Like It Hot"	Unknown	Unknown	January 29, 1997	465715	4.47
16	16	"Party at Nick's Place"	Unknown	Unknown	February 5, 1997	465713	3.59
17	17	"My Phoney Valentine"	Unknown	Unknown	February 12, 1997	465716	3.98
18	18	"My Mother the Star"	Unknown	Unknown	February 19, 1997	465718	4.38
19	19	"Pain in the Schneck"	Scott Baio	Bill Marich	February 26, 1997	465717	3.14
20	20	"Nick on Wheels"	Unknown	Unknown	April 27, 1997	465719	2.27
21	21	"Jamapalooza (Part 1)"	Unknown	Unknown	May 4, 1997	465720	2.20
22	22	"Jamapalooza (Part 2)"	Unknown	Unknown	May 11, 1997	465721	1.77

=== Season 2 (1997–98) ===
No. overall	No. in season	Title	Directed by	Written by	Original release date	Prod. code	Viewers (millions)
23	1	"Gerald R. Fraud"	Unknown	Unknown	September 7, 1997	466701	2.59
24	2	"He's Gotta Have It"	Amanda Bearse	David Garrett	September 14, 1997	466702	2.39
25	3	"Nick at Night"	Amanda Bearse	David Garrett	September 21, 1997	466703	2.27
26	4	"Tasha Tells All"	Unknown	Carolyn Omine	September 28, 1997	466704	2.69
27	5	"MC 2"	Amanda Bearse	Unknown	October 5, 1997	466705	2.79
28	6	"Sophia Del Bono (Licensed Cosmetologist)"	Unknown	Unknown	October 12, 1997	466706	2.41
29	7	"Dr. Love"	Scott Baio	Jill Cargerman	October 26, 1997	466707	2.87
30	8	"Blast from the Past"	Unknown	Unknown	November 2, 1997	466709	2.16
31	9	"On the Rocks"	Unknown	Unknown	November 9, 1997	466708	3.35
32	10	"Sophia's Choice"	Amanda Bearse	Unknown	November 16, 1997	466710	4.02
33	11	"The Weighting Game"	Amanda Bearse	David Garrett	November 23, 1997	466711	2.77
34	12	"The Full Marco"	Scott Baio	Carolyn Omine	December 7, 1997	466712	2.41
35	13	"Against All Odds"	Unknown	Unknown	January 11, 1998	466713	2.78
36	14	"Out of Her Class"	Unknown	Unknown	January 18, 1998	466714	3.06
37	15	"Baby Blues"	Art Dielhenn	Ed Driscoll	February 1, 1998	466715	2.93
38	16	"Burned Out"	Unknown	Unknown	February 8, 1998	466716	2.90
39	17	"Foul Play"	Unknown	Unknown	February 15, 1998	466717	3.15
40	18	"Driving Mr. Jordan"	Unknown	Unknown	February 22, 1998	466719	3.40
41	19	"Under the Gun"	Unknown	Unknown	March 1, 1998	466718	3.38
42	20	"Model Citizen"	Unknown	Unknown	April 26, 1998	466721	2.45
43	21	"Dome Alone"	Unknown	Unknown	May 3, 1998	466720	2.71

== Ratings ==
Season	Network	Season premiere	Season finale	Rank	Viewers (in millions)
1	The WB	August 28, 1996	May 11, 1997	#142	3.0
2	The WB	September 7, 1997	May 3, 1998	#172	1.9

== Awards and nominations ==
Year	Award	Category	Recipient	Result
1997	Young Artist Awards	Best Family TV Comedy Series	Nick Freno: Licensed Teacher	Won
1997	Young Artist Awards	Best Performance in a TV Series – Young Ensemble	Cara DeLizia, Kyle Gibson, Jonathan Hernandez, Ross Malinger, and Arjay Smith	Won
1998	ALMA Award	Outstanding Actor in a Comedy Series	Jonathan Hernandez	Nominated

== Reception ==
Entertainment Weekly noted that while the show was in last place in the ratings much of that was due to both the competition and that the WB network was not as wildly distributed as other networks.

WB entertainment chief Garth Ancier stated the show was partially renewed for the second season on the networks belief in the lead actor.
