= Sleepless in Seattle =

1993 film by Nora Ephron

- Theatrical release poster
- Directed by: Nora Ephron
- Screenplay by: Nora Ephron; David S. Ward; Jeff Arch
- Story by: Jeff Arch
- Produced by: Gary Foster
- Starring: Tom Hanks; Meg Ryan; Bill Pullman; Ross Malinger; Rob Reiner
- Cinematography: Sven Nykvist
- Edited by: Robert Reitano
- Music by: Marc Shaiman
- Distributed by: TriStar Pictures
- Release date: June 25, 1993 (United States)
- Running time: 105 minutes
- Country: United States
- Language: English
- Budget: $21 million
- Box office: $227.9 million

Sleepless in Seattle is a 1993 American romantic comedy film directed by Nora Ephron, from a screenplay written by Jeff Arch, David S. Ward and Ephron. Starring Tom Hanks and Meg Ryan, the film follows a journalist (Ryan) who becomes enamored with a widowed architect (Hanks) after his young son calls in to a talk-radio program requesting a new wife for his grieving father. In addition to Bill Pullman, Ross Malinger, and Rob Reiner, the film also features Rosie O'Donnell, Gaby Hoffmann, Victor Garber, Rita Wilson, Barbara Garrick, and Carey Lowell.

Inspired by director Leo McCarey's An Affair to Remember (1957), which was a remake using the same script of McCarey's Love Affair (1939), Sleepless in Seattle was conceived as a romantic drama by Jeff Arch in 1989. Several studios rejected his script, deterred by the idea that its main couple does not meet for nearly the entire film. Ward and Ephron were hired for script revisions, with Ephron tapped to direct. Although both Hanks and Ryan had been favored for the lead roles from the beginning, several other actors expressed interest in both parts. The film was shot mostly in Seattle during the summer of 1992. Several of its pivotal scenes were filmed on a former naval base due to the city's lack of sound stages, including a recreation of the Empire State Building's observation deck when the New York skyscraper was not available.

Sleepless in Seattle was released by TriStar Pictures on June 25, 1993, to positive reviews, receiving praise for Ephron's writing and direction, as well as Hanks and Ryan's performances. The film received two nominations at the 66th Academy Awards: Best Original Screenplay and Best Original Song. Despite competition from several blockbusters released around that same summer, the film was a surprise commercial success, earning $17 million during its opening weekend (the highest opening for a romantic comedy at the time), and ultimately grossing over $227.9 million worldwide against a $21 million budget. It was one of the highest-grossing films of 1993, and remains one of the most successful romantic comedies in box-office history. Its success extended to the home video market: it was the top rental of 1994 in the United States. The soundtrack was also successful, peaking at number one on the Billboard 200.

Several critics and media publications agree that Sleepless in Seattle is one of the greatest romantic-comedy films of all time. The film is also credited with establishing Ephron as a celebrated romantic comedy filmmaker.

== Plot ==
Architect Sam Baldwin moves from Chicago to Seattle with his eight-year-old son, Jonah, to start a new life following the death of his beloved wife, Maggie. Over a year later, on Christmas Eve, Jonah calls a nationally syndicated radio talk show seeking advice on how to help his father find happiness again. He persuades a reluctant Sam to go on the air and talk about how much he misses Maggie. Sam describes her as his soulmate, explaining that he knew she was the one when he first took her hand and believes he could never find true love twice. Touched by his story, thousands of women across the country write to him.

One listener is Annie Reed, a Baltimore Sun reporter. She is engaged to the sensible and supportive Walter, but feels something is missing from their relationship. Her friend and editor, Becky, suggests Annie longs for the kind of destined romance found "in a movie", although Annie dismisses the idea of magical love or fate. Inspired by the romance film An Affair to Remember, Annie writes Sam a letter proposing they meet atop the Empire State Building in New York City on Valentine's Day. She decides against sending it, but Becky secretly mails it.

Encouraged by the response to his radio appearance and by his friends, Sam begins dating a co-worker, Victoria, whom Jonah vehemently dislikes. When Jonah reads Annie's letter, he instinctively believes she could be the one for his father, but Sam dismisses the idea because of the distance between Seattle and Baltimore. Jonah's friend Jessica urges him to reply on Sam's behalf, agreeing to the meeting. After Jonah calls the radio show again and reveals that Sam is dating, Annie travels to Seattle on a work assignment arranged by Becky as a pretext to learn more about him.

While dropping Victoria off at the airport, Sam notices Annie leaving her flight and is immediately captivated by her, unaware of who she is. Later, Annie secretly watches Sam and Jonah playing together on the beach. The following day, she visits Sam's houseboat but mistakes his sister, Suzy, for Victoria. A passing vehicle nearly strikes Annie and sounds its horn, alerting Sam to her presence. They briefly stare at one another and manage only to exchange "Hello"s before Annie, embarrassed, leaves.

Back in Baltimore, Annie reads Jonah's immature reply to her letter and concludes she has made a mistake pursuing Sam. She decides to commit to Walter and travels to New York to meet him on Valentine's Day. Meanwhile, Jessica uses her travel agent mother's computer to book Jonah a flight to New York to find Annie. When Sam learns where Jonah has gone, he flies after him, and they reunite on the Empire State Building's observation deck.

During dinner with Walter, Annie confesses her doubts about their relationship, everything that has happened since hearing Sam's radio broadcast, and they amicably end their relationship. Seeing the Empire State Building illuminated in the shape of a heart, Annie takes it as a sign. She rushes there, arriving on the observation deck moments after Sam and Jonah have left in the elevator.

When Sam and Jonah return to retrieve Jonah's misplaced backpack, Sam and Annie recognize each other. After introducing themselves, Annie takes Sam's hand, and the three leave together.

== Cast ==
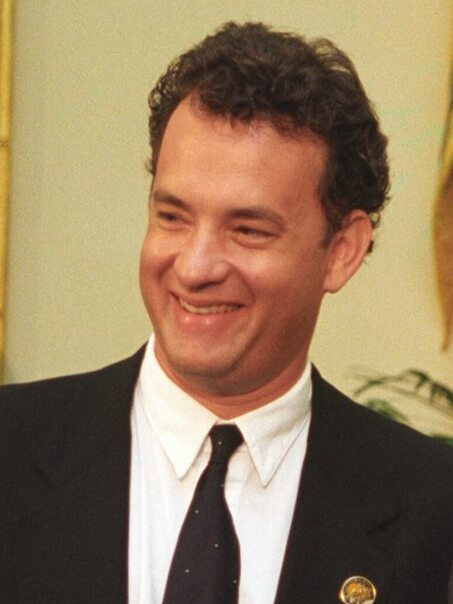
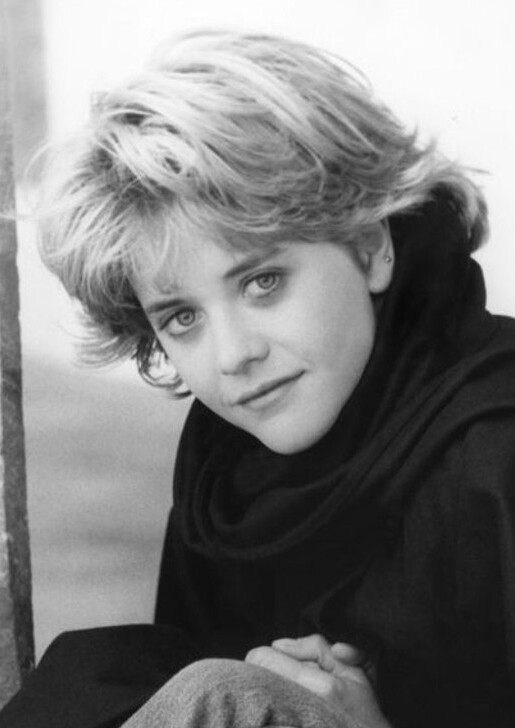
Tom Hanks (pictured in 1995) and Meg Ryan (1983)
- Tom Hanks as Sam Baldwin, a widowed architect struggling to move on after the death of his wife
- Meg Ryan as Annie Reed, a Baltimore newspaper reporter who becomes fascinated by Sam after hearing his radio interview
- Bill Pullman as Walter Jackson, Annie's dependable fiancé
- Ross Malinger as Jonah Baldwin, Sam's eight-year-old son
- Rob Reiner as Jay Mathews, Sam's friend and confidant
- Rosie O'Donnell as Becky, Annie's friend and editor
- Gaby Hoffmann as Jessica, Jonah's friend
- Victor Garber as Greg, Sam's brother-in-law, and fellow architect
- Rita Wilson as Suzy Baldwin, Sam's sister and Greg's wife
- Barbara Garrick as Victoria, Sam's co-worker and girlfriend
- Carey Lowell as Maggie Baldwin, Sam's late wife
- David Hyde Pierce as Dennis Reed, Annie's brother
- Dana Ivey as Claire, Sam's demanding client

Sleepless in Seattle also features Brian McConnachie as Bob, Kevin O'Morrison as Cliff Reed, Michael Badalucco as New York Cab Driver, Caroline Aaron as Dr. Marcia Fieldstone, Frances Conroy as Irene Reed, Calvin Trillin as Uncle Milton, Le Clanché du Rand as Barbara Reed, and Rich Hawkins and Hannah Cox as Jessica's parents.

== Production ==
=== Origins and development ===
In 1989, Sleepless in Seattle was conceived by Jeff Arch, a struggling writer and former cinematographer, whose work as a writer had experienced little to no success at the time . Sleepless in Seattle was Arch's first script to be optioned as a film. The story began as a play about two people falling in love over the telephone without meeting in person. Arch decided that, unlike typical romance plots in which the main characters bicker for most of the film after they "meet cute", his couple would not meet until the end of the film, feeling unprecedented confidence that Sleepless in Seattle would be successful as long as he "got these people to the top of the Empire State Building on Valentine's Day". The writer drew inspiration from several sources, including the French film And Now My Love (1974), a seminar by motivational speaker Tony Robbins, and a Washington Post article he had read about women hiring private investigators to uncover information about their romantic partners.

Arch faced criticism about the unlikelihood of the film being made due to the lack of scenes shared by its lead couple. He pitched the film to at least six studios and executives, all of whom rejected it for similar reasons. Desperate, Arch's agent Dave Warden submitted the spec script to producer Gary Foster in 1990. Although Foster typically discards new scripts that fail to captivate him within its first 25 pages, he claims to have read past the 25th page of Arch's script unnoticed, only to find he was crying by the last page. Immediately noticing the script's potential, Foster submitted the script to TriStar Pictures executive Richard Fischoff, whose studio had produced all of his previous films. At first, Fischoff's staff screened the script and passed on it. After pleading from Foster, Fischoff eventually relented and read the script, optioning it to TriStar a few days later.

Eventually TriStar chairman Mike Medavoy heavily promoted the film, and Foster began interviewing potential directors shortly after. Nick Castle had been slated to write and direct Hook (1991), a big-budget adaptation of Peter Pan also for TriStar, but he was eventually removed from the film in favor of Steven Spielberg. The studio reassigned Castle to Sleepless in Seattle as a consolation. Garry Marshall had also been considered to direct. While Foster retained sole producer credit, the film was co-executive produced by Lynda Obst and Patrick Crowley. Foster struggled to get the film made over the following two years. After finally agreeing to maintain the idea of keeping the couple separated, TriStar insisted that the "wistful" script be re-written to make the film and each character edgier and quirkier, particularly Sam and Annie. Foster found the script lacked the sophistication and complexity required to elevate an emotional, sentimental story beyond merely treacle. Foster reluctantly informed Arch they were interested in changing writers in order to "sharpen" his script. Although Arch submitted a re-write himself, he soon found he was essentially "kicked off my own movie", and replaced by a writer with whose work he was not pleased, such as relocating the entire film to New York without including the Empire State Building. Arch begged Foster and director Nick Castle to hire a better writer "who's going to take this way up to the next level".

=== Writing ===
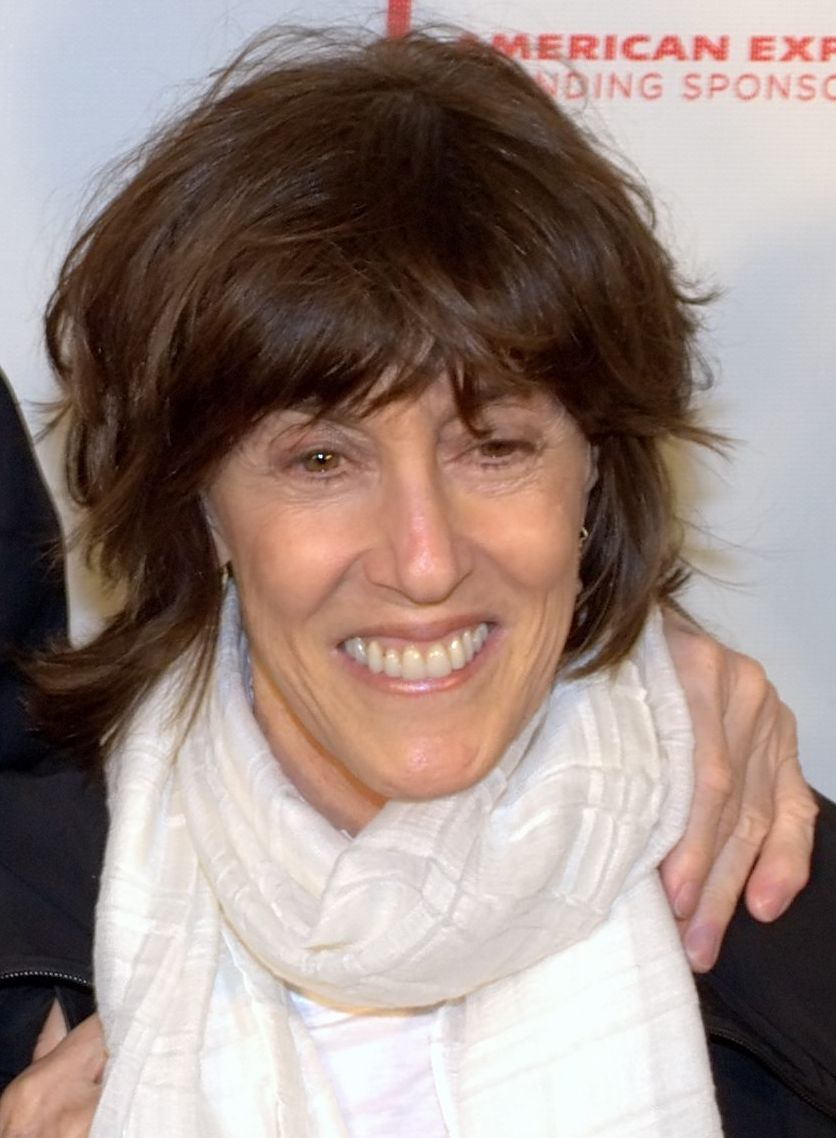
Originally hired to improve Sleepless in Seattle's script, Nora Ephron was eventually promoted to director, replacing Nick Castle.

Several writers and directors were involved with Sleepless in Seattle at various stages of development, with Arch's script being re-written approximately five times. Arch's original concept was more akin to a romantic drama than a romantic comedy. Despite already featuring several of the film's major elements, such as a central father-son relationship and references to the romance film An Affair to Remember (1957), Arch admitted his script was not funny enough. Dramatist Larry Atlas attempted some revisions, most of which were discarded. Foster interviewed at least 10 potential writers before hiring David S. Ward to re-write Arch's script. Among the most significant changes, Ward decided to have Jonah call the radio station on Sam's behalf. Insisting that no self-respecting man would deliberately call a radio show to share his emotional grievances, Ward suggested that Sam be coerced by Jonah into revealing how he feels about his late wife to several single women throughout the country, including Annie. Arch credits Ward with convincing the studio to not give up on the film, believing the latter's Academy Award for writing The Sting (1973) helped them take him seriously as a filmmaker. However, the studio constantly pushed for an edgier and quirkier film. Despite acknowledging Ward's work as "a big step forward for the script", Foster was not entirely satisfied with the revisions and forwarded them to writer Nora Ephron, having been a fan of her work on When Harry Met Sally... (1989). Ephron had been Foster's first choice, hoping she could offer the script "a cynical layer to justify the organic sweetness", but she was unavailable when first approached to re-write.

At least four writers attempted to rework Sleepless in Seattle before Ephron was recruited to "polish" the fifth and final draft. Ephron had been searching for script doctoring jobs shortly after her directorial debut This Is My Life (1992) proved unprofitable at the box office. Admitting that she never would have conceived the film herself, Ephron initially accepted Sleepless in Seattle as a fun, easy writing project from which she could quickly earn money. Although she found Arch's version simple and unfunny, Ephron particularly liked his romantic ending involving the Empire State Building, and was interested in several ideas discussed in Ward's second draft, particularly how movies affect people's perception about romance. Ephron assured Foster that she could re-write the script within three weeks, adapting it into a funnier version of itself without entirely making it a comedy. She specifically improved Annie and Jonah's roles. In an early draft, the character of Annie was in the midst of ending an unhappy relationship; Ephron wrote this out of the film because she found Annie's original backstory inconsequential in comparison to Sam's loss of his wife. Annie was also relocated from Lancaster, Pennsylvania, to Baltimore, Maryland, as the character had originally been conceived as a Lancaster-based reporter. Foster credits Ephron with contributing most of the film's dialogue, while de-emphasizing much of Arch's sentimentality. While crediting Ephron with providing her trademark wit and snark the studio felt the original script lacked, Arch does not think all of Ephron's ideas particularly elevated the film. Describing themselves as quite different as writers, Arch likened their working relationship to "a parent and a step-parent of the same kid". However, they shared a strong love for classic films, with Ephron admitting she herself once considered An Affair to Remember to be "the greatest movie I'd ever seen". Ephron said the final film turned out funnier than she had imagined.

Castle left the project over disagreements with Ephron's edgier, less sentimental script, accusing her of stripping the film of emotion. Ephron claims virtually everyone liked the final script she submitted, apart from Castle. Impressed by Ephron's swiftness and dedication, Foster invited her to direct. Although Ephron protested the film was not quite ready to be directed, feeling it warranted at least one more rewrite, she eventually accepted and recruited her sister Delia to help improve several scenes. One such moment was the final scene in which Annie meets Sam and Jonah atop the Empire State building; Delia suggested that the father and son should be returning to the observation deck just as Annie is readying to leave, instead of having already exited the building. Despite serving as an associate producer alongside Arch, Delia remains uncredited for her script contributions, although a script dated March 10, 1992, is credited to Arch with re-writes by Nora and Delia Ephron. Ephron considers Sleepless in Seattle a "secret present" to their late parents, who were also screenwriters, as well as classic Hollywood movies. As "a movie about love that was also about movies about love", Ephron aimed to direct a "timeless" film audiences could watch for several years, without it feeling like it was made in 1993.

Ephron was also determined to give each character a "moment", such as when the minor mailman character has an inconsequential conversation about hiccups with Sam's son Jonah. At one point, the script mentioned that Sam and Annie had once both lived in Chicago at the same time, but this was edited out of the final film. Sleepless in Seattle became Ephron's second directorial effort. Premiere reported that, once Ephron became involved, the film "changed ... from a script that almost everyone had turned down into one that almost everyone wanted to be involved with". Although Arch did not necessarily agree that Ephron saved the film, he understood that "sometimes, you're not the star but that if you keep doing your job right, you will be the star", and maintains that several scenes ultimately remained almost exactly how he had envisioned them in his first draft, despite several re-writes.

=== Casting ===
Ephron promised Foster that her revised screenplay would be deserving of actors Tom Hanks and Meg Ryan, (Note: Tom Hanks and Meg Ryan were considered to be two of the most popular and successful actors of the 1990s.) the latter being the actress Ephron had in mind for the character Annie. While Arch had also written the female role for Ryan due to her performance in When Harry Met Sally, he had envisioned Kevin Costner in the role of Sam. A different pair of actors had originally been envisioned in the lead roles, but departed because they were deemed not funny enough for Ephron's material. Several actresses pursued the role of Annie once they learned of Ephron's involvement, including Julia Roberts, (Note: Meg Ryan had previously turned down the lead role of Vivian Ward in Gary Marshall's "Pretty Woman", which ultimately starred Julia Roberts.) Kim Basinger, Michelle Pfeiffer, Sharon Stone, Jodie Foster, Demi Moore and Madonna, but Ephron was determined to cast Ryan, having enjoyed working with her on When Harry Met Sally... Ryan initially expected to star in the film with her then-husband Dennis Quaid, who had been looking for a film to star in together. The couple had also been close friends with Medavoy at the time. However, Ephron felt Quaid was not funny enough to play Sam, a role she and the studio decided was more suitable for Hanks. Having grown weary of playing goofy, immature characters by this point in his career, Hanks initially turned down the role because he was unhappy with its original script, but was drawn towards Ephron's revisions because he felt her version of Sam was more serious than previous roles he had played. Despite her interest in Hanks, Ephron was not entirely convinced the actor could play a romantic leading man in the vein of Cary Grant until she met him for the first time. Hanks and Ryan had previously starred as a couple in the film Joe Versus the Volcano (1990). Despite being the film's romantic leads, the co-stars share only two scenes together, approximately two minutes of screen time.

Bill Pullman originally assumed he would have a larger role in the film as Annie's fiancé Walter, since Sleepless in Seattle had been pitched to him as a love triangle similar to The Philadelphia Story (1940), envisioning himself as the James Stewart character to Hanks's Cary Grant and Ryan's Katharine Hepburn. Nathan Watt was originally cast as Sam's son Jonah, but after working together for a few days, Hanks found the child actor to be disruptive on set while trying to film scenes he was not involved in. Watt was ultimately replaced with Ross Malinger, an actor Ephron remembered from earlier auditions, although Ephron did not like some aspects of his appearance. Jason Schwartzman had also auditioned for the role. Comedian Rosie O'Donnell was cast as Becky, Annie's best friend and coworker. O'Donnell had made her film debut in A League of Their Own (1992) the previous year, appearing alongside both Hanks and Pullman. O'Donnell credits Ephron's son Jacob Bernstein with helping her secure the role, as he was a fan of her friend Madonna, with whom the comedian had also starred in A League of Their Own. Inspired by Whoopie Goldberg's Academy Award-winning performance in Ghost (1990), Ephron felt hiring a comedian in a funny supporting role would similarly benefit Sleepless in Seattle. O'Donnell based her performance on singer and actress Bette Midler, specifically emulating the way she walks and talks in order to convey "the funny, caustic best friend with a heart of gold" role she had wanted to play since deciding to become an actor. Eventually reduced from two-pages, the speech was the longest of O'Donnell's career at that point. She noted her experience was particularly different from A League of Their Own, which had been largely improvisational compared to Ephron's organized directorial style. O'Donnell and Ephron lived in the same apartment building while filming Sleepless in Seattle, which Ephron had obtained for her. Hanks' wife Rita Wilson originally auditioned for the role of Becky, but Ephron preferred her for the role of Sam's sister Suzy, which the director found particularly convenient because Wilson was already in Seattle with her husband. Ephron cast Rob Reiner, who directed When Harry Met Sally..., as Sam's friend in the film, with Reiner contributing to many of the film's laughs.

According to some of the main cast, Ephron typically insisted that the actors recite their lines almost exactly as-written, although Ephron herself said she was open to the cast improvising and re-writing dialogue they felt was unfunny. Hanks and Victor Garber improvised the scene in which their characters feign tears while recounting the film The Dirty Dozen (1967), mocking Suzy who has been brought to tears by summarizing the plot of An Affair to Remember. Hanks and Ephron agreed that his character was underwritten. Ephron invited the actor to help rewrite his character, which ultimately resulted in "a grumpier, funnier Sam". Hanks did not truly commit to the role until he, Ephron and Delia reviewed his character scene by scene, ultimately improving his part. Hanks and Ephron sometimes disagreed over his character's actions, with Hanks accusing the director of making Sam too "wimpy" by writing him from a woman's perspective. He also complained that better lines had been written for his character's son, and lobbied for Sam and Jonah's relationship to be more paternal than maternal. In the original screenplay, Sam decides not to spend a weekend away with his new girlfriend Victoria in fear of upsetting Jonah. Hanks found this unconvincing for a grown man, suggesting to Ephron that, despite his son's feelings, his character would most likely be absolutely determined to sleep with Victoria after having been single for several years by that point. Ephron re-wrote the scene so Sam only relents once he learns Jonah has taken a plane to New York. Hanks believes the film's drama ultimately benefited from being rooted in logic and "true, human behaviour". Arch explained that, despite some resistance from the actor, Hanks ultimately "rode that boundary, between being a man and having feelings he's able to express", which was rare for a male character during the 1990s. Ephron described Hanks as "manly in a part that requires him to be tender -and a lot of other things", calling him "one of the few actors around ... who can do tender and irritable and angry all at the same time". She credits Hanks with teaching her that writers should always provide the main actor with something to play off of, so they are never passive or idle during a scene.

Ephron had envisioned the role of Clarisse, Jonah's babysitter, as a Shelley Duvall-type role. They ultimately cast Amanda Maher in the role, a waitress they had discovered at the Gravity Bar in Seattle, citing her as a natural. Ephron herself voices "Disappointed In Denver", a depressed character who calls into the radio show Annie is listening to in the middle of the night. Actress Parker Posey was cast in a minor role that was ultimately cut from the film. The director wrote Posey an apologetic letter assuring her that the removal from the film was not her own fault. Ephron eventually cast her in a larger role in the romantic comedy You've Got Mail (1998), also starring Hanks and Ryan. Foster appears as an extra in the restaurant scene, during which Sam and Victoria attend their first date. Hanks accused Foster of being too loud during the scene.

=== Filming ===
Although Seattle had always been the film's main setting, the filmmakers only realized how significant the location was upon seeing it for themselves. Arch was inspired to have Sam live in a houseboat after watching a Seattle-based episode of This Old House that featured host Bob Vila visiting a similar home. Ephron initially believed that during the 1990s young Americans prioritized their careers over their personal lives. However, upon visiting Seattle, she discovered it as a city where "people have chosen lifestyle over work", and decided to set the film there. Ephron explained that this is one of the reasons why Sam moves to Seattle from the work-focused Chicago. Vancouver, British Columbia, which film studios typically use as an affordable Seattle stand-in, was briefly considered an option, but Foster ultimately found the Canadian city to be less diverse than Seattle, hardly distinguishable from other large cities and too Canadian-looking. Principal photography began in July 1992. Once she submitted the final draft in March 1992, Ephron described the film's filming schedule as almost instant, recalling that they were scouting locations in June and filming by August that same year. The film had a production budget of $25 million, with The Seattle Times reporting that the studio spent approximately $4 million on Seattle-based labor, hotels, meals and local vendors. Foster explained that they decided to primarily use local resources to save money on necessities such as crew, imported labor and airfare. Specific Seattle landmarks featured in the film include the Pike Place Market, the Sorrento Hotel, Alki Beach, the Fremont Bridge, SeaTac Airport, the Dahlia Lounge, and several 1st Avenue shops.

The filmmakers could not find a warehouse large enough to house one set; therefore, much of the film was shot on the Sand Point Naval Base. Due to the lack of sound stages in Seattle at the time, the filmmakers sought to use the base as it was about to be shut down, but received little response from the federal bureaucracy until Ephron herself contacted Republican senator John Warner, a former Secretary of the Navy. At times sets and parts of props were shipped between Seattle and Baltimore to ensure sets remained consistent, particularly a door that both Ryan's and Hanks' characters use in separate scenes. Ephron ensured the same door was used to demonstrate the connection between the characters, working with editor Robert M. Reitano to connect their stories via visual parallels, since otherwise the characters hardly share screen time. Because Seattle was experiencing a drought while filming, the filmmakers imported water trucks to simulate the rain scenes. The city was reportedly angry about what they perceived as a waste of water. In addition to Seattle, scenes were shot in Chicago, Illinois; Baltimore, Maryland; and New York City. Ironically, Foster deemed a house located on Queen Anne Hill "Baltimore enough" to serve as the Baltimore-based home of Annie's parents. Ephron intended for the opening shot of the Chicago skyline at Maggie Baldwin's funeral to evoke artist Saul Steinberg's 1976 The New Yorker cover View of the World from 9th Avenue. A set designer reportedly found working with Ephron so difficult that they begged to be fired from the film.

The studio was initially denied permission to shoot some of the film's final scenes at the Empire State Building, whose management refused to close the observation deck to tourists to allow filming. Ephron strongly believed that "you are two phone-calls away from anyone". Ephron knew the publicist who was representing building owner Leona Helmsley, who was in prison for tax evasion at the time. After discussing the matter with her publicist who visited her in jail, Helmsley granted them permission to use the building for only six hours. This allowed them to film the helicopter shot, Annie's lobby scene, and Jonah searching the observation deck for Annie. The observatory of the Empire State Building on which Sam and Annie finally meet during the film's climax was actually a replica built in Hangar 27 of the Sand Point Naval Base, instead of New York City. The building was digitally lit for the film. Ryan was physically uncomfortable while running towards the Empire State Building in order to meet Sam because her shoes were ill-fitting.

The film's costumes were designed by Judy Ruskin, who designed most of Ryan's wardrobe. Ruskin was careful to dress Ryan in modest, loose-fitting clothes to demonstrate Annie's "pure heart", as per Ephron's direction. Ephron hired Sven Nykvist as the film's cinematographer, as she was instructed to recruit "the world's best cinematographer". According to Ephron, he was typically able to light scenes in as little as six minutes. Ephron and production designer Jeffrey Townsend deliberately limited the use of the color red during the first hour of Sleepless in Seattle. The color appears more frequently after Sam and Annie first pass each other at the airport in Seattle, and a soccer team wearing red uniforms spills into the crowd between them. Red gradually becomes more common throughout the rest of the film, representing the "passion shared by the pair as they finally meet and fall in love". The filmmakers also avoided using blue, a color Ephron particularly dislikes. Arch was surprised to find that certain shots matched what he had envisioned when writing the film, including the use of shooting stars in the title sequence.

== Music ==
Sleepless in Seattle: Original Motion Picture Soundtrack

Soundtrack album by Various Artists
- Released: June 15, 1993
- Genre: Pop
- Length: 37:48
- Label: Epic Soundtrax
- Producer: Marc Shaiman

Professional ratings
Review scores
Source	Rating
Los Angeles Times	3/4 stars
Music Week	3/4 stars
Philadelphia Inquirer	3/4 stars

The film was originally to have been scored by John Barry, but when given a list of twenty songs he had to put in the film, he quit. The film was ultimately scored by Marc Shaiman. Peter Guber, head of Sony Studios, wanted to use Celine Dion and Clive Griffin's duet "When I Fall in Love" in the final scene, but Ephron insisted on using "Make Someone Happy" by Jimmy Durante. Instead of seeking Guber's permission, Ephron decided to see how the test audience would react, to which they responded well. In addition to Dion, the soundtrack also included contributions by Nat King Cole, Carly Simon and Harry Connick Jr.

1. "As Time Goes By" by Jimmy Durante – 2:28
2. "A Kiss to Build a Dream On" by Louis Armstrong – 3:01
3. "Stardust" by Nat King Cole – 3:15
4. "Makin' Whoopee" by Dr. John featuring Rickie Lee Jones – 4:09
5. "In the Wee Small Hours of the Morning" by Carly Simon – 3:16
6. "Back in the Saddle Again" by Gene Autry – 2:36
7. "Bye Bye Blackbird" by Joe Cocker – 3:30
8. "A Wink and a Smile" by Harry Connick, Jr. – 4:08
9. "Stand by Your Man" by Tammy Wynette – 2:41
10. "An Affair to Remember" by Marc Shaiman – 2:31
11. "Make Someone Happy" by Jimmy Durante – 1:52
12. "When I Fall in Love" by Celine Dion and Clive Griffin – 4:21

=== Charts ===
1993–1994 weekly chart performance for Sleepless in Seattle
Chart (1993–1994)	Peak position
Australian Albums (ARIA)	3
Canada Top Albums/CDs (RPM)	5
German Albums (Offizielle Top 100)	71
Icelandic Albums (Tónlist)	7
New Zealand Albums (RMNZ)	10
UK Compilation Albums (Official Charts)	28
US Billboard 200	1

2004 weekly chart performance for Sleepless in Seattle
Chart (2004)	Peak position
UK Soundtrack Albums (Official Charts)	38

1993 year-end chart performance for Sleepless in Seattle
Chart (1993)	Position
Australian Albums (ARIA)	38
US Billboard 200	18

1994 year-end chart performance for Sleepless in Seattle
Chart (1994)	Position
US Billboard 200	56

=== Certifications ===
Certifications for Sleepless in Seattle
Region	Certification	Certified units/sales
Australia (ARIA)	Platinum	70,000^{^}
Canada (Music Canada)	Platinum	100,000^{^}
New Zealand (RMNZ)	Gold	7,500^{^}
United Kingdom (BPI)	Gold	100,000^{*}
United States (RIAA)	4× Platinum	4,000,000^{^}
^{*} Sales figures based on certification alone.^{^} Shipments figures based on certification alone.

Dreams Come True's "Winter Song" is the theme song for the Japanese version, although the lyrics are in English.

== Themes ==
Luchina Fisher of ABC News summarized Sleepless in Seattle as "the story of a kid who plays matchmaker between his widower father and a woman having second thoughts about her fiancé". According to CinemaBlend's Jerrica Tisdale, the film discusses themes about taking chances and destiny. Hanks believes falling in love with someone's voice is a relatable catalyst, explaining that "We've all experienced something like that". Although generally associated with Valentine's Day due to its focus on romance, the film also features Christmas and New Year's Eve elements.

The Baltimore Sun's Stephen Hunter described the film as a "shameless romantic fantasy" and its heroine as "a sort of icon of nearly pure '50s innocence", with Ephron herself dressing Ryan's character to resemble a Breck girl. With a self-aware tone considered to be unusual for the time of its release, Sleepless in Seattle parodies the romantic comedy genre, despite being a romantic comedy itself. Calling the film "a throwback to the great romantic comedies of the '30s and '40s", Common Sense Media described Sleepless in Seattle as "a fairy tale that encourages viewers to believe that true love and destiny will conquer all obstacles". According to Tyler Coates of Flavorwire, Ephron uses An Affair to Remember to challenge "the cinematic joys that predated her own films", observing that the 1957 film brings at least four female characters to tears throughout Sleepless in Seattle. Ephron described An Affair to Remember as "a running character" throughout film, which Annie routinely refers to as guide about her own love life. Several scenes from An Affair to Remember are shown throughout the film, which Annie and Becky constantly watch despite questioning "what something so seemingly shallow and unrealistic could possibly offer them". When Annie finally meets Sam atop the Empire State Building, the theme from An Affair to Remember plays. One of the film's major recurring themes is "love in the movies" and cinema's influence over how viewers perceive love, which in turn affects their ideals, goals, and decisions; Annie attempts to recreate the feelings she has seen in films because she has yet to experience them herself. The film also strives to prove that "art imitates life", as opposed to life imitating art. Vulture's Matthew Jacobs said the film "doubles as a comment on the way Hollywood romance has perpetuated fantasies of what love looks like", which the author said is best exemplified by O'Donnell's line "You don't want to be in love; you want to be in love in a movie". Several commentators have referenced this line analyzing the film's themes. Film and media studies professor Michele Schreiber said the quote is "meant to elicit a sense of recognition among Sleepless in Seattle's audience because the text assumes that by nature of the fact that they are watching the film, its spectators must empathize with, if not share, Annie's desire to fall in love in a way that is completely removed from the mundane realities of everyday life" while "assum[ing] that the audience will find equally familiar Becky's pointed critique of Annie's misguided preoccupation". According to However, Decider's Meghan O'Keefe said the film lacks "any real ground-breaking commentary on the state of the human heart".

According to a review published by Encyclopedia.com, Sleepless in Seattle "explores the differences between men and women when it comes to love and romance". However, Coates noted that, despite its meta commentary about classic Hollywood romances and gender, the film "avoids any of the vulgarities and complications of recent submissions to the romantic comedy genre", while also at times deviating from gender stereotypes. The critic noted that while Annie initially dismisses the concepts of fate and soul mates, trying to convince herself that her relationship with Walter is more practical than romantic, Sam openly likens his feelings for his late wife to magic, which ultimately prompts her "to embark on a philosophical journey of sorts to find out whether attraction is something otherworldly after all". The A.V. Club's Caroline Siede wrote that the film "balances romance and realism by giving its central characters two different but equally pragmatic philosophies on love". While Annie believes "meant-to-be love" is only found in fairy tales, Sam argues that true love exists because he experienced it with his late wife, but believes it can not be experienced more than once in one's lifetime. Siede also said that, due to the focus on Sam and Jonah's relationship, at times the film more-so resembles a "father/son dramedy" occasionally intercut with a serviceable romantic comedy plot, elaborating that for most of the film "only Annie is an active rom-com player while Sam is just obliviously living his life", with much of Sam's comedy stemming from a man starting to date again during "the burgeoning era of third-wave feminism". Ephron believes Sleepless in Seattle more-so fits into the romantic comedy genre as opposed to the "women's movies" she pokes fun at in the film, explaining, "We aren't a classic weeper in any sense of the word – although some people cry when they see our movie".

Rebecca Deczynski of Good Housekeeping said the film discusses both the positive and negative aspects of long distance relationships. Distinguished from other romantic comedies because its main couple is separated for most of the film, Ephron identified "the global village" as one of the film's main themes, explaining "we all live in one place ... and it's connected by airplanes, 800-number radio shows, the same jokes and statistics. By the time Tom and Meg are out on their respective piers sitting on their respective benches, you feel like it's a love scene even though they are 3000 miles apart". In an article written in 2018, Corey Chichizola of CinemaBlend observed that although the film's plot seemed plausible at the time of its release, "the majority of the film's events and problems could be solved instantly if there were smart phones around", determining that the introduction of various technology since Sleepless in Seattle has in term limited storytelling, with writers of future films being required to find logical ways to eliminate smart phones and dating apps in order for certain plots to be plausible. Nicole Sperling of Vanity Fair observed that Jessica's use of acronyms and Annie's "journalistic tenacity" pre-date instant messaging and Google search by several years. Agreeing that Sleepless in Seattle "has become a journey into nostalgia" in the decades since the film's release, Elle's R. Eric Thomas said "there's something sweet and appealing about the relative simplicity—even simplicity in a film with a plot as complex as this one's. And who amongst us isn't rediscovering the telephone during this time, when even small distances seem yawning? Or the simple pleasure of a mailed letter? (Thank you to all the Post Office employees!) After a grueling three years during which the dark underbelly of nostalgia was used to prop up the worst aspects of this country's history and present, it's particularly heartening to be reminded that sometimes, the hallmarks of the past can continue to help us." O'Donnell theorized that although the film might be received as a story about catfishing in modern times, its setting and innocence harkens "back to a time where everything seemed a little bit simpler".

== Release ==
=== Marketing and promotion ===
Although Foster and Ephron estimate that the studio spent at least $20 million marketing the film, TriStar senior vice president of publicity Ed Russell claims they spent significantly less, despite their admittedly competitive marketing campaign. Sleepless in Seattle was heavily advertised during daytime programming to target female viewers, who responded well to its posters and trailers. The film's official theatrical release poster, which depicts Hanks and Ryan gazing into the sky from opposite time zones, features the tag line "What if someone you never met, someone you never saw, someone you never knew was the only someone for you", which was inspired by a line spoken by Ryan's character in the film. Despite its female target audience, trailers and television spots were geared towards men by prominently featuring Hanks and Reiner. A trailer aired during the televised broadcast of President Bill Clinton's inaugural ball in January 1993, five months before its release date, with Clinton's inaugural committee specifically asking TriStar to advertise during the gala. TriStar paid approximately $250,000 for the 30-second commercial. Foster claims advertising during the inaugural ball implied that the studio was warning the film industry to "Watch out, we believe in this movie and we're not afraid to do anything. We're not afraid to spend money". He also maintains that the decision to advertise during the telecast was business-driven as opposed to political, explaining that the studio saw anticipated the gala's expected high ratings would promote Sleepless in Seattle to a significantly larger audience.

The studio also discussed corporate tie-ins with companies such as greeting card companies, teleflorists and Tiffany & Co. for corporate tie-ins. On Valentine's Day 1993, chocolate recreations of the Empire State Building were offered to 200 critics. Test screenings hosted in January were well-received and widely covered by several American magazines, including Premiere, Redbook, Allure and Movieline. Variety reported that Sleepless in Seattle scored 94 out of 100 in at least one of its screenings, encouraging the studio to reschedule the film for a summer release. Senior vice president of publicity Ed Russell arranged several word of mouth screenings for the film, including a conference held for romance novel and magazine editors on May 16, 1993, in San Diego. A benefit premiere was hosted for Sleepless in Seattle at the Cinedome in Seattle in June 1993, with proceeds going towards the Pike Place Market Foundation.

Originally planned to be released in April 1993, Sleepless in Seattle was rescheduled for summer 1993 because studio executives predicted it could be a popular summer hit, despite competing with several large-scale blockbusters and action-adventure films at the time, notably Jurassic Park, The Firm, Cliffhanger and Last Action Hero. Sleepless in Seattle was considered to be one of the year's few "date movies", and was also branded "1993's When Harry Met Sally ...". According to Kathy Tyre of Adweek, TriStar crafted a marketing campaign that branded Sleepless in Seattle as the summer's "romantic alternative". Marketing executive Kathy Jones confirmed that the studio would spend significantly more money marketing the film due to its summer relocation but claims they wanted to avoid over-promoting "a lovely, romantic movie". Tri-Star theorized the romantic comedy would attract women who were not particularly interested in watching the year's action films, serving as "counter-programming" to the roster of more traditional summer blockbuster fare. Columbia, TriStar's sister studio, had used the same strategy for When Harry Met Sally... four years prior. Rescheduling the film also removed direct competition such Indecent Proposal (1993), which was expected to have higher box office returns than Sleepless in Seattle. However, releasing the film in June also proposed the risk of Sleepless in Seattle being overlooked by an estimated 60 films being released that summer, among them What's Love Got to Do With It and The Firm.

Foster believes that had the film been released in April as originally planned, they would have already spent most of their marketing budget by the time the year's blockbusters were released, explaining that "This kind of counterprogramming in the summer seems to work", whereas Ephron felt releasing the film earlier would have forced them to remove the film from theatres in order to make way for the summer blockbuster films. Sneak previews were hosted in 750 theatres the Saturday before the film's release, which were filled to 80% capacity. In addition to much publicity, previews were consistently very well-received by audiences. The film was ultimately released to theatres on June 25, 1993, and was the first film to use the 1993 TriStar Pictures logo.

=== Box office ===
Despite initially being perceived as an underdog, the film was surprisingly successful at the box office, becoming "the surprise hit of the season" according to The Baltimore Sun's Mike Littwin. The film was widely touted the sleeper hit of the summer. Sleepless in Seattle opened theatrically on June 25, 1993, coincidentally the same day as former Sleepless in Seattle director Nick Castle's Dennis the Menace. It premiered in 1,579 venues, earning $17,253,733 in its opening weekend, ranking second in the North American box office behind the third weekend of Jurassic Park. Sleepless in Seattle had the most successful opening weekend for a romantic comedy at the time. The Los Angeles Times reported that the opening weekend audience was 60% female and 40% 30 years and older. At the end of its run, the film grossed $126,808,165 in the United States and Canada, and $101,119,000 in other territories, for a worldwide total of $227,927,165.

According to HuffPost, Sleepless in Seattle's earnings established it as "the most successful traditional romantic comedy of all-time" at the time of its release. Ephron and Foster attribute the film's success to its release being postponed from March 26 to June 25. The film became one of the highest-grossing of 1993, and remains the 13th highest-grossing romantic comedy in the United States. According to The Numbers, Sleepless in Seattle is the 21st highest-grossing romantic comedy of all-time.

In July 1993, Rolling Stone journalist Lawrence Frascella predicted that Ephron "is poised to become one of Hollywood's leading women directors" with the success of Sleepless in Seattle. To commemorate the film's 25th anniversary, Fathom Events and Sony Pictures Entertainment re-released Sleepless in Seattle in approximately 400 theatres throughout the United States for two days, on the December 2 and 5, 2018. Ryan and Foster filmed a new introduction exclusive to the re-issue.

The film continues to be aired regularly on various television stations.

=== Home media ===
The film was released on VHS on December 8, 1993, by Columbia TriStar Home Video. It proved very successful in the rental market, and ended up as the most rented movie of 1994 in the United States.

== Reception ==
=== Critical response ===
Sleepless in Seattle received positive reviews upon release. Critics particularly praised Hanks and Ryan's performances and chemistry in the lead roles. Audiences polled by CinemaScore gave the film an average grade of "A" on an A+ to F scale. Rolling Stone film critic Peter Travers lauded Sleepless in Seattle as "the hippest, frankest and funniest date movie around", praising the leads' performances and Ephron's writing for poking fun at classic romance films "without for a second denying their potency. In Sleepless, she breaks your heart without making you feel like a jerk. As date movies go, that's the ultimate in compliments".

Roger Ebert of the Chicago Sun-Times said the film was "as ephemeral as a talk show, as contrived as the late show, and yet so warm and gentle I smiled the whole way through." He added:

The actors are well-suited to this material. Tom Hanks keeps a certain detached edge to his character, which keeps him from being simply a fall guy. Meg Ryan, who is one of the most likable actresses around and has a certain ineffable Doris Day innocence, is able to convince us of the magical quality of her sudden love for a radio voice, without letting the device seem like the gimmick it assuredly is.

Vincent Canby of The New York Times called it "a feather-light romantic comedy" and wrote, "It's a stunt, but it's a stunt that works far more effectively than anybody in his right mind has reason to expect. Not since Love Story has there been a movie that so shrewdly and predictably manipulated the emotions for such entertaining effect." Gene Shalit on the Today Show called the film "One of the most beloved films of our time".

In a mixed review, Owen Gleiberman of Entertainment Weekly lauded Hanks performance for anchoring but found Sleepless in Seattle itself to be too contrived, writing, "it feels programmed to make you fall in love with it". Criticizing Ephron's reliance on clichés, Gleiberman said the director "mixes old ones from Hollywood with new ones from pop-psych therapy", describing the film as "a '50s tearjerker synthesized by microchip" which lacks the "delicately sexy sparkle" of its predecessors. John Simon of the National Review wrote that the "entire picture is a collection of nauseating quotations and references to An Affair to Remember, both visual and verbal". The Baltimore Sun's Mike Littwin dismissed the film as a "chick flick" geared towards women with little pay off for male audiences, apart from "forc[ing] us to re-examine our values".

=== Retrospective response ===
Retrospective reviews have remained mostly positive. On review aggregator Rotten Tomatoes 76% out of 62 professional critics gave the film a positive review. The consensus states, "Sleepless in Seattle is a cute classic with a very light touch and real chemistry between the two leads – even when spending an entire movie apart." According to the same website, Sleepless in Seattle is their 146th highest-rated romantic comedy of all-time (out of 200), warning readers that they might find the film's relatively low placement surprising considering its popularity. Rotten Tomatoes also ranked Sleepless in Seattle the 53rd best blockbuster of the 1990s decade. On Metacritic, the film has a 72 out of 100 rating, based on 17 critics, indicating "generally favorable reviews".

Caroline Siede of The A.V. Club praised both the lead and supporting cast's performances; the father-son dynamic between Hanks and Malinger's characters during both comedic and heartfelt moments. Praising the performances of Hanks, Ryan, O'Donnell and Reiner, as well as the film's humor, The Guardian film critic Peter Bradshaw said Ephron "brought her terrific flair, wit and nous, although she propagates the terrifying fallacy that a widower makes a wonderful romantic catch". Virginia Florey of the Midland Daily News said the film "still do[es] a fantastic job of pulling you into their story and their search to find that one person to love". While declaring that Sleepless in Seattle remains the best romantic comedy ever released, Body+Soul contributor Hannah-Rose Yee said despite being "the kind of movie that gives romantic comedies a bad name ... no film has come close to distilling what Sleepless in Seattle does about the ridiculous enterprise that is opening up your heart to someone else". However, she admitted that one's ability to enjoy the film depends "entirely on how on board you can get with a romance in which the two lead characters don't meet until the last five minutes". The Guardian's Luke Walpole, who had avoided watching the film until 2020 in fear that it had aged poorly, ultimately found Ephron's screenplay to be a gorgeous "balance of melancholy and fizzing optimism", but criticized Sleepless in Seattle's "narrowly middle class and privileged" characters. Common Sense Media wrote that the film is successful in Ephron's hands, despite its "frustrating" structure at times.

Siede noted that Annie's actions in pursuit of Sam have been re-evaluated as what some critics perceive as stalker behavior, with Nicole Sperling of Vanity Fair feeling Annie's determination "verges into stalker territory". Siede defended the character, writing "Annie's 'romantic' stalking falls well within the purview of creepy real-world behavior we're somehow willing to forgive in a heightened rom-com context. And plenty of beloved rom-com leading men have pulled stunts just as creepy". R. Eric Thomas of Elle noted that "in terms of rom-com hijinks and poor decisions that turn out great, nothing beats [Annie's behavior] in Sleepless in Seattle", but relented that the film remains "a jewel". Thomas also found Wilson's An Affair to Remember monologue to be deserving of an Academy Award, and one of the film's best scenes. Guy Lodge of The Guardian commended Ryan for helping "her character's wildly irrational whimsy ... make sympathetic sense". Upon re-watching the film in 2016, Bustle's S. Atkinson perceived Annie as "a woman who is pretty damn morally dubious with regards to her relationship to her fiancée", explaining that "I'd gone from completely doting on the two leads when watching it first time round as a kid to finding them the absolute worst watching again an adult".

=== Accolades ===
Sleepless in Seattle received two nominations at the 66th Academy Awards (held in 1994). It lost the award for Best Original Screenplay to The Piano, while the song "A Wink and a Smile" lost Best Original Song to "Streets of Philadelphia" (from Philadelphia, another Tom Hanks film). The film was nominated for three Golden Globe Awards: Best Actor – Motion Picture Musical or Comedy (Tom Hanks), Best Actress – Motion Picture Comedy or Musical (Meg Ryan) and Best Motion Picture – Musical or Comedy.

The film won four awards at different ceremonies. Ryan won the award for Funniest Actress in a Leading Role at the American Comedy Awards. At the 1994 Young Artist Awards, Malinger won the award for Best Actor Under Ten in a Motion Picture and the film itself won Outstanding Family Motion Picture for Comedy. The film's screenplay was also nominated for Writers Guild and BAFTA awards.

Award	Date of ceremony	Category	Recipient(s)	Result
Academy Awards	March 21, 1994	Best Original Screenplay	Nora Ephron, David S. Ward and Jeff Arch	Nominated
Academy Awards	March 21, 1994	Best Original Song	"A Wink and a Smile"	Nominated
American Comedy Awards	March 6, 1994	Funniest Actress in a Motion Picture (Leading Role)	Meg Ryan	Won
American Comedy Awards	March 6, 1994	Funniest Actor in a Motion Picture (Leading Role)	Tom Hanks	Nominated
American Comedy Awards	March 6, 1994	Funniest Supporting Actress in a Motion Picture	Rosie O'Donnell	Nominated
BAFTA Film Awards	April 15, 1994	Best Original Music	Marc Shaiman	Nominated
BAFTA Film Awards	April 15, 1994	Best Screenplay	Nora Ephron, David S. Ward and Jeff Arch	Nominated
Brit Awards	February 14, 1994	Soundtrack/Cast Recording	Sleepless in Seattle	Nominated
Casting Society of America	October 20, 1994	Feature Film Casting — Comedy	Juliet Taylor	Won
Golden Globe Awards	January 22, 1994	Best Motion Picture – Musical or Comedy	Sleepless in Seattle	Nominated
Golden Globe Awards	January 22, 1994	Best Actor – Motion Picture Musical or Comedy	Tom Hanks	Nominated
Golden Globe Awards	January 22, 1994	Best Actress – Motion Picture Comedy or Musical	Meg Ryan	Nominated
MTV Movie Awards	June 4, 1994	Best Female Performance	Meg Ryan	Nominated
MTV Movie Awards	June 4, 1994	Best Breakthrough Performance	Ross Malinger	Nominated
MTV Movie Awards	June 4, 1994	Best Movie Song	"When I Fall in Love" (Celine Dion and Clive Griffin)	Nominated
MTV Movie Awards	June 4, 1994	Best On-Screen Duo	Tom Hanks & Meg Ryan	Nominated
Writers Guild of America Awards	March 13, 1994	Best Screenplay Written Directly for the Screenplay	Nora Ephron, David S. Ward and Jeff Arch	Nominated
Young Artist Awards	February 5, 1994	Best Actor Under Ten in a Motion Picture	Ross Malinger	Won
Young Artist Awards	February 5, 1994	Outstanding Family Motion Picture – Comedy	Sleepless in Seattle	Won

== Musical adaptation ==
In 2009, development began on a musical version of Sleepless in Seattle. David Shor was announced as the musical's producer, with a book being written by Jeff Arch, Shor's longtime partner and original story writer for the motion picture. Leslie Bricusse was initially attached to the project, but withdrew due to "creative differences with the show's producer and director". Michelle Citrin, Michael Garin and Josh Nelson were announced to be working on the music and lyrics, with Shor discovering Citrin via YouTube. The musical was initially set to premier in 2010, with the premiere date later being moved to 2011 and June 2012. In February 2012, Shor announced that the musical would not premiere until the 2012–13 season and that the show would "undergo a top-to-bottom overhaul" and would have a new creative team. With a new score by composer Ben Toth and lyricist Sam Forman, the musical version premiered at the Pasadena Playhouse in May 2013.

After being postponed for several years, the musical was due to open in London's Troubadour Wembley Park Theatre on March 24, 2020, under the name Sleepless: A Musical Romance starring Jay McGuiness, Kimberley Walsh and Daniel Casey as Sam, Annie and Walter respectively.

But, delays due to the COVID-19 pandemic pushed the show back to August 25, 2020, for a run through September 27. The show required the audience to be socially distanced and used several other pandemic-era safety measures.

== Legacy ==
Revered as a classic love story, reviewers deemed Sleepless in Seattle a classic almost immediately upon release, crowning it "the ultimate romantic comedy". Sleepless in Seattle is widely celebrated as one of the greatest romantic comedy films of all-time, with several media publications ranking it among the best romantic comedies. (Note: Attributed to multiple references:) S. Atkinson of Bustle declared it the decade's "definitive romantic comedy". Some critics consider it to be one of the best romance films. CinemaBlend's Corey Chichizola said few romantic comedies have remained "as iconic and beloved" as Sleepless in Seattle, attributing its popularity to nostalgia and fans longing for a simpler time. Calling Sleepless in Seattle arguably "the last great American romantic comedy", Flavorwire's Tyler Coates said the film also effectively remains "a subtle, serious employment of a genre usually dismissed as frivolous, lighthearted entertainment marketed solely to women" and "a serious contribution of artistic merit" to an otherwise saturated genre. Considered to be one of the all-time great romantic films by the American Film Institute, the organization included Sleepless in Seattle on both its best romance and romantic comedy film lists, ranking it 45th and 10th respectively. Television presenter Francine Stock credits Sleepless in Seattle with changing the trajectory of romantic comedies. In 2021, The Hollywood Reporter associate editor Lexy Perez declared that the film remains "a household name in the world of romantic comedies". Marie Claire named Sleepless in Seattle one of the 61 definitive films of the 1990s.

Ryan, who has not watched the film since 1993, believes it is unlikely that a film like Sleepless in Seattle would be successful again due to the main characters' lack of scenes together. Foster theorized that the film continues to resonate with audiences due to its sense of magic, specifically the belief that "there's this timeless wish fulfillment that you're going to meet that person somewhere". According to Susan King of Variety, the Empire State Building scenes have "become an indelible scene in pop culture". Philip Sledge of Cinema Blend hailed the ending as one of the greatest in the romantic comedy genre, while Jessica Brajer of MovieWeb called it "one of the most emotional scenes in all of movie history". Crowning Sleepless in Seattle "The Best Rom-Com Ending of All Time", Decider contributor Meghan O'Keefe said the ending ultimately saves the film from being dismissed as simply "another inoffensive romantic comedy", writing that its lack of a kiss or wedding scene ultimately distinguished from similar films. O'Keefe concluded, "It's a gorgeous triumph of a moment that's defined by the simple offering of a hand". The ending has also been parodied and recreated several subsequent media, including an episode of The Mindy Project in 2014. The film is also credited with introducing younger generations to An Affair to Remember, by which Sleepless in Seattle was inspired.

The film's success positively impacted its cast and crew, who went on to have successful entertainment careers. Vogue credits Hanks' performance with making him America's favorite person, while Garth Pearce of the Daily Express said the film established Ryan as America's sweetheart. For Vanity Fair, journalist Michael Shnayerson said Sleepless in Seattle "crowned [Ryan] as America's screwball darling", shortly after which she began earning at least $15 million per film. While ranking Sleepless in Seattle one of the best performances of Hanks' career, Rolling Stone's David Fear credits the film with establishing the actor as a romantic comedy sex symbol. Hanks, Ryan, and Ephron would reunite for one more film, the romantic comedy You've Got Mail, in 1998. Sleepless in Seattle was the second of four on-screen collaborations between Hanks and Ryan, (Note: Tom Hanks and Meg Ryan have starred in four films together: Joe Versus the Volcano in 1990, Sleepless in Seattle in 1993, You've Got Mail in 1998, and Ithaca (which Ryan also directed) in 2015.) with Kelly O'Sullivan of The Pioneer Woman crowning them both "the unofficial king and queen of rom-coms" and "the most iconic rom-com couple of all time". According to Good Morning America contributor Luchina Fisher, Sleepless in Seattle is one of three Ephron films that "breathed new life into the" romantic comedy genre, alongside its predecessor When Harry Met Sally... and successor You've Got Mail. Despite being her second directorial effort, Sleepless in Seattle's success eclipsed that of her directorial debut, and ultimately established Ephron "as a major directorial force in the rom-com genre". In 2018, The A.V. Club's Caroline Siede said the film remains her finest work as a director. On its 20-year anniversary, HuffPost wrote that the film continues to resonate due to "Ephron's sharp dialogue and the inherent goodness and charm projected by both Hanks and Ryan". According to Ariel Levy of The New Yorker, Sleepless in Seattle established Ephron as a famous director. In 2013, co-executive producer Lynda Obst released a book named after the film, Sleepless in Hollywood: Tales from the New Abnormal in the Movie Business, which explores the decline of romantic comedies during the 2010s. Obst remarked that Sleepless in Seattle's nearly $300 million gross is hardly considered a "smash" as of 2014, explaining, "Studios aren't happy unless it makes close to a billion dollars".

Sleepless in Seattle is credited with introducing most Americans to tiramisu, which had been a relatively obscure dessert before 1993. Rob Reiner's character Jay mentions "tiramisu" during a conversation with Sam about dating, which Sam mistakes a euphemism for a sexual act. Jay does not clarify that tiramisu is actually an Italian dessert. The conversation caused much interest in the dessert throughout America. According to Josie Delap of The Economist, few Americans had been familiar with the dessert before Sleepless in Seattle, despite America's high Italian population at the time. After the film's release, several viewers resorted to calling the studio directly to find out what tiramisu is, with TriStar executive Susan Levin reporting they were receiving 20–30 phone calls per day about the subject by the first Monday after the film's release. Levin claims several callers were either disappointed or refused to believe them when they explained that tiramisu is simply a dessert, although some were relieved by the revelation. Some restaurants and bakeries also reported an increase in tiramisu purchases and orders after the film. Tom Stockley of The Seattle Times observed that, by October 1993, "Virtually every Italian restaurant in the Seattle area features [tiramisu], as do several non-Italian eateries. It may be Seattle's hottest dessert, just as it is elsewhere in the country". According to cookbook author Dorie Greenspan, Sleepless in Seattle turned tiramisu from simply an Italian dessert into a phenomenon almost overnight, reporting that "Minutes after the movie opened, every morning TV show had some cook making tiramisu", while The Free Press Journal said the film resulted in global fame for the desert. Olga Massov of The Washington Post said some tiramisu began to suffer in quality due to their popularity, reporting that several restaurants began taking shortcuts in order to keep up with the demand. In a 2014 interview with RogerEbert.com, Reiner dismissed tiramisu as overrated, insisting that he would never order it for himself.
