= Aaron Speiser =

American acting coach

- Born: 1953 or 1954 (age 72–73); Manhattan, New York, U.S.
- Education: Master of Fine Arts from Brandeis University
- Occupations: Acting coach, film director
- Website: Website

Aaron Speiser (born 1953 or 1954) is an American acting coach and film director based in Los Angeles, California. He is the founder of the Speiser/Sturges Acting Studio, formerly known as Aaron Speiser Acting Studio, an acting school based in Los Angeles, California. Speiser has coached some of the most notable individuals in film and television industry, including Academy Award winner Will Smith, Academy Award nominee Virginia Madsen, and Jennifer Lopez.

He is currently the co-owner and partner with Kay Aston at The Screen Acting Studio in Los Angeles, California.

== Early life and education ==
Aaron Speiser was born in 1953 or 1954 in Manhattan, New York, to Pola and Julius Speiser and was raised in the Bronx. His parents were Holocaust survivors who were of Polish descent.

Speiser attended Brandeis University where he received an MFA degree in acting.

Later, he attended HB Studio in New York City, where he studied with Uta Hagen, Bill Hickey and his mentor Kenneth McMillan.

== Career ==
He worked professionally in theatre, film and television for 15 years before fully committing to teaching.

=== Coaching ===
He is the longtime preferred coach for Will Smith, Virginia Madsen, and Jennifer Lopez. He has also taught or coached several other prominent film and television artists including Martin Lawrence, Heather Graham, Karyn Parsons, Kevin Ryan, Lauris Reiniks, Jeff Dunham, Gerard Butler, Elijah Kelley, Hrithik Roshan and many more. Speiser has also worked on the sets with several acclaimed directors and producers such as Michael Mann, Oliver Stone, F. Gary Gray, Peter Berg, Ang Lee, Reinaldo Green, Antoine Fuqua, Tim White, Trevor White and Barry Sonnenfeld. He has been credited with on-set coaching in the making of various films such as Hustlers, King Richard, Out of Sight, I Am Legend, Hancock, Olympus Has Fallen and The Pursuit of Happyness.

In 1994, Speiser directed the feature film, Talking About Sex, starring Kim Wayans, which he also co-wrote and produced. The film received accolades at Palm Springs International Film Festival, and won the Best Film Award at Breckenridge Film Festival. Aaron also directed two episodes of The Wayans Brothers, “The Son of Marlon” (season 4, ep.13), and “Pops Gets Evicted” (season 5, ep. 16).

== Credits ==
Film credits of Aaron Speiser
| Year | Title | Credited as | Notes |
|---|---|---|---|
| 2022 | Marry Me | Acting coach to Jennifer Lopez | |
| 2021 | King Richard | Acting coach to Will Smith | |
| 2013 | After Earth | Acting coach to Will Smith | |
| 2013 | Open Road | Acting coach | |
| 2013 | Parker | Acting coach to Jennifer Lopez | |
| 2012 | Chasing Mavericks | Acting coach to Gerard Butler | |
| 2012 | Men in Black 3 | Acting coach to Will Smith | |
| 2012 | The Magic of Belle Isle | Acting coach to Virginia Madsen - uncredited | |
| 2012 | About Cherry | Acting coach to Heather Graham - uncredited | |
| 2011 | Machine Gun Preacher | Acting coach to Gerard Butler - uncredited | |
| 2011 | Red Riding Hood | Acting coach to Virginia Madsen | |
| 2009-2010 | Hawthorne | Acting coach to Jada Pinkett Smith | 16 episodes |
| 2010 | Kites | Acting coach to Hrithik Roshan | |
| 2010 | The Back-Up Plan | Acting coach to Jennifer Lopez | |
| 2010 | The Losers | Acting coach | |
| 2009 | NCIS: Los Angeles | Acting coach to LL Cool J | 5 episodes |
| 2009 | Law Abiding Citizen | Acting coach to Gerard Butler | |
| 2008 | Seven Pounds | Acting coach to Will Smith | |
| 2008 | Hancock | Acting coach to Will Smith | |
| 2007 | The Man | Acting coach to LL Cool J | TV movie |
| 2007 | I Am Legend | Acting coach to Will Smith | |
| 2007 | The Number 23 | Acting coach to Virginia Madsen | |
| 2006 | El Cantante | Acting coach to Jennifer Lopez | |
| 2006 | Last Holiday | Acting coach to LL Cool J | |
| 2005 | House | Acting coach to LL Cool J | 1 episode |
| 2005 | Slow Burn | Acting coach to LL Cool J | |
| 2005 | Edison | Acting coach to LL Cool J | |
| 2005 | Be Cool | Acting coach to Dwayne "The Rock" Johnson | |
| 2004 | I, Robot | Acting coach to Will Smith | |
| 2004 | Mindhunters | Acting coach to LL Cool J | |
| 2003 | S.W.A.T. | Acting coach to LL Cool J | |
| 2003 | The Italian Job | Acting coach | |
| 2003 | Deliver Us from Eva | Acting coach to LL Cool J | |
| 2002 | Rollerball | Acting coach to LL Cool J | |
| 2002 | A Walk to Remember | Acting coach to Mandy Moore | |
| 2001 | Kingdom Come | Acting coach to LL Cool J | |
| 2000 | Charlie's Angels | Acting coach to LL Cool J | |
| 2000 | Daddio | Acting coach to Donny Osmond | 1 episode |
| 1999 | Any Given Sunday | Acting coach to LL Cool J | |
| 1999 | In Too Deep | Acting coach to LL Cool J | |
| 1999 | Deep Blue Sea | Acting coach to LL Cool J | |
| 1995 | The Jeff Foxworthy Show | Acting coach to Jeff Foxworthy | 1 episode |
