= The Breaks (1999 film) =

1999 film directed by Eric Meza

- Directed by: Eric Meza
- Written by: Mitch Mullany; Jeff Stolzer
- Produced by: Bob Shapiro; Terry Spazek
- Starring: Mitch Mullany; Carl Anthony Payne II; Paula Jai Parker; Clifton Powell; Darius McCrary; Paul Benjamin; Lamont Bentley; Loretta Devine
- Cinematography: Carlos González
- Distributed by: Artisan Entertainment
- Release date: February 26, 1999
- Running time: 86 minutes
- Country: United States
- Language: English

The Breaks is a 1999 American comedy film written by and starring Mitch Mullany and directed by Eric Meza.

== Plot ==
A Sunday in the life of Derrick King, an Irish kid raised in Compton, California by a black family. He speaks and dresses in a way that might be called "black" and thinks of himself as a black person. It is a day of disasters: his mom kicks him out of the house, his uncle fires him, the woman he loves dismisses him as childish, the LAPD, wearing Confederate flag shoulder patches, impound his car and toss him in the drunk tank, a mean dude is after him for money, he is imprisoned in a store basement by gay sadists, and he is shot at.

Along the way, however, he shows kindness to a near-sighted kid, and those random acts may prove to be his salvation. Rappers Xzibit, E-40 and Flesh-n-Bone appear in the film.

The movie features numerous parodies, including one of Pulp Fiction, as well as Good Will Hunting, and an appearance by George Clinton as himself. Professional basketball player Gary Payton has a speaking role in the movie.

== Cast ==
- Mitch Mullany as Derrick King
- Lamont Bentley as Darryl
- Carl Anthony Payne II as Chris
- Paula Jai Parker as Ann
- Clifton Powell as Cosmo
- Loretta Devine as Floria
- Paul Benjamin as Clerk
- Gary Payton
- George Clinton as Himself
- Xzibit as Jamal
- E-40 as Judge
- Anthony Anderson as Inmate #1
- John Farley as Police Officer

== Release ==
=== Home release ===
The film was released on DVD by Artisan Home Entertainment in 2000.

== See also ==
- List of hood films
