= Mitch Mullany =

American actor and comedian (1968–2008)

- Born: Mitchell Paul Mullany; September 20, 1968; Oakland, California, U.S.
- Died: May 25, 2008 (aged 39); Los Angeles, California, U.S.
- Occupations: Actor; comedian; screenwriter; author
- Years active: 1988–2008
- Notable work: The Wayans Bros; The Breaks; The Sweetest Thing; Nick Freno: Licensed Teacher
- Website: web.archive.org/web/20060217055018/http://mitchmullany.com:80/index_1.html

Mitchell Paul Mullany (September 20, 1968 – May 25, 2008) was an American stand-up comedian, actor, screenwriter, and author. Mullany was best known for his portrayal of White Mike in the 1990s comedy sitcom The Wayans Bros and as Nick Freno in the sitcom Nick Freno: Licensed Teacher, which both aired on The WB.

== Career ==
Mullany was born in Concord, California on September 20, 1968. At the age of 19 he began his stand-up career, performing in East Oakland venues. In 1988, he performed on MTV's 1/2 Hour Comedy Hour, It's Showtime at the Apollo, and An Evening at the Improv. After a minor recurring role as White Mike on the sitcom The Wayans Bros. from 1995 to 1996, he starred in his own series, Nick Freno: Licensed Teacher, from 1996 to 1998. Both shows aired on The WB.

During his breaks from Nick Freno: Licensed Teacher, he continued to perform his stand-up act around the country. In 1999, he wrote and starred in his first feature film The Breaks as Derrick King. In 2003, he hosted an ABC reality series called All American Girl. He appeared numerous times on The Tonight Show with Jay Leno.

In 2006, he wrote and published a book titled Stranded at Almost, and started a YouTube channel in January 2007.

== Death ==
Mullany died on May 25, 2008, of a diabetic stroke.

== Filmography ==
Film
Year	Film	Role	Notes
1999	The Breaks	Derrick King	Writer
2002	The Sweetest Thing	Craig	
Television
Year	Title	Role	Notes
1995	Hangin' with Mr. Cooper	Joey	1 episode
1995–1996	The Wayans Bros.	White Mike	Recurring role, 6 episodes
1996–1998	Nick Freno: Licensed Teacher	Nick Freno	Lead role, 43 episodes
