= Christine Losecaat =

Christine Losecaat van Nouhuys (born 17 October 1965) is a Dutch business strategy, creative, marketing and communications specialist. She is CEO of Little Dipper, a strategy and creative consultancy.

She won a Prime Time Emmy in 1996 for her part as co-producer of Peter & The Wolf. A creative industries trade and Investment specialist she has created, designed and delivered programmes and events including The British Business Embassy at Lancaster House during the London 2012 Olympic Games and the UK's presence at Milan Expo 2015 and Expo Astana 2017.

In 2014 she was elected an Honorary Fellow of the British Institute of Interior Design for her impact on the development and success of the interior design profession ) and was appointed an Honorary MBE for services to the creative industries in 2016.

Losecaat is Chair of Advance, a front-line women's charity for women who are involved in offending behaviour or the criminal justice system. She also chairs the Mears Foundation, the charitable arm of Mears Group plc and is a Trustee at animal welfare charity, Mayhew.

== Early life and education ==
Losecaat is a Dutch national. She was born in Munich, Germany lived in Italy but now resides in London. Her father was the journalist and publisher Heinz van Nouhuys She studied at Queen Mary College, University of London and Henley Business School.

== Career ==
Christine started her career in the advertising industry working for Cream Advertising. She then worked for BMG Entertainment where she was International Marketing Director working on the organisations’ audio visual output for its major international recording artists and projects including Wallace and Gromit and Pingu. While working at BMG she co-produced the first full-length animated feature of Prokofiev's production of Peter and the Wolf. The film won the 1996 Prime Time Emmy Award for Best Children's Program and the Gold Hugo at the Chicago International Film Festival.

From 1997 to 2001, Losecaat was managing director of The British Design Initiative, where she represented commercial design to industry and government and developed the award-winning first directory of commercial design for UK.

She established her consultancy, Little Dipper in 2001 focused on special projects in an international context.

In 2003 she was appointed Design Industry Adviser by DCMS / UK Trade & Investment.

Losecaat was appointed co-producer for Torino World Design Capital 2008. In that capacity she produced the International Design Casa, a series of 10 international exhibitions from 15 participating nations ^{]} and the first global design policy conference “Shaping the Global Design Agenda’.

She was listed in Design Week's Hot 50 in 2009 as one of 50 most influential people in the design sector.

In 2006, she created the concept of the London Design Embassy with designer Tom Dixon and journalist Marcus Fairs. The London Design Embassy was a pop up VIP club for international buyers and media to meet with leading UK design talent.

London Design Embassies took up residence for the duration of London Design Festival in an empty space with content curated by a leading London designer. In 2006 the London Design Embassy was at the ICA, curated by Tom Dixon and co-produced by Russell Sage. In 2007 it moved to the newly refurbished Royal Festival Hall's top floor and was curated by Ross Lovegrove . In 2008 it took up residency at Somerset House, curated by Jay Osgerby and Ed Barber.

In 2009 Losecaat took the London Design Embassy overseas to Milan and created the British Design Embassy, curated by Sir Paul Smith

Losecaat worked with the Prime Minister's Office, the Foreign & Commonwealth Office, the Department for Business and UK Trade & Investment's Olympic Legacy and Olympic Delivery Units to conceive and deliver the UK's international business programme and economic legacy piece during the London 2012 Games.

Throughout 2005–2015 she has been advising the UK government on the international strategy for the Creative Industries helping UK companies win major projects internationally as well as international businesses find a base in the UK. During that time, she established the China Design Taskforce and the Creative Industries High Value Opportunities Task Force.

She was closely involved with the UK business programme at Expo 2010 Shanghai, and subsequently chaired UK China Partners a not for profit organisation introducing creative supply chains to Chinese manufacturers.

Losecaat was Client Creative Director for the UK Pavilion at Expo 2015 Milano, the UK Pavilion at Expo 2017 Astana and developed the participation strategy, theme statement, creative brief and design competition for the UK Pavilion at Expo 2020 Dubai, UAE. The UK Pavilion in Milan has won over 20 international design awards including the prestigious BIE Gold Award for Architecture and Landscape It attracted over 3 million visitors in Milan and has now been re-located to Kew Gardens in London. The Pavilion in Astana won the BIE Silver Award for Best Pavilion in its category. She was Executive Project Director for the USA Pavilion at Expo 2025, Osaka.

Losecaat is co-founder of Createch, an annual summit taking place in London during London Technology Week for the Creative Industries Council. She also advised on the programming of the India-UK Createch Summit 2018 which yielded £58m in commercial deals.

From 2018 - 2018 she was a Trustee of Peace Child International a United Nations accredited charity that empowers young people to be the change they want to see in the world through education, employability and entrepreneurship.

Her non-executive career also includes advising the IABM (International Trade Association for Broadcast and Media Technology) as a Board member from 2020 - 2023.
