= Jill Tasker =

American retired actress (born 1964)

- Born: Jill Renee Tasker; 1963 or 1964 (age 61–62)
- Occupations: Voice over artist, personal coach, television actress
- Years active: 1988–1999
- Spouse(s): Marc Hirschfeld; Doug Stender

Jill Renee Tasker (born 1963 or 1964) is an American retired actress. Tasker had starred as "Lou Malino" for nine episodes of the 1995-96 season, of The WB's, The Wayans Bros. She also appeared in guest roles on The Days and Nights of Molly Dodd, Law & Order, American Playhouse and other shows.

== Early years ==
Tasker is a native of Columbus, Indiana. Her father was James R. Tasker, her mother is Sandi Hinshaw, and her stepfather is Tom Hinshaw. She studied drama and acted in productions at Columbus (Indiana) East High School, from which she graduated in 1982. She graduated from Boston University's School of Fine Arts in 1986 with a degree in theater.

== Career ==
Tasker's television debut came in a 1988 episode of Hothouse. Off-Broadway productions in which she performed included And the Air Didn't Answer, Tiny Mommy, and Women & Wallace. She portrayed Sybil Chase in the 1992 Broadway production of Private Lives. In 2019 she performed in her first one-woman show, a one-act play that was part of "Collector's Showcase 2019: A Sitting with Marie" in Nashville.

Tasker earned a J.D. degree in 2004 and currently works as a voiceover artist and personal coach.

In November 2013, she became executive director of the Southern Indiana Center for the Arts.

== Personal life ==
Tasker married Marc Hirschfeld on July 6, 1991, in Columbus. She later married actor Doug Stender and resided in New York City before she moved back to Columbus.
