= The Wayans Bros. =

American television sitcom (1995–1999)

- Genre: Sitcom
- Created by: Marlon Wayans; Shawn Wayans; Leslie Ray; David Steven Simon
- Starring: Marlon Wayans; Shawn Wayans; John Witherspoon; Anna Maria Horsford; Lela Rochon; Paula Jai Parker; Jill Tasker
- Theme music composer: Alan Cohn; Kamaal Fareed; Ronnie Foster; Ali Shaheed Muhammad; Malik Taylor; (original songwriters; seasons 1–2); Tom Rizzo (season 3); Shawn Wayans; Marlon Wayans; Omar Epps; Eric Willis (seasons 4–5)
- Opening theme: "Gimme a High-Five (The We're Brothers Song)" performed by Shawn Wayans and Marlon Wayans (seasons 1–5); "Electric Relaxation" by A Tribe Called Quest (seasons 1–2); Instrumental themes (seasons 3–5)
- Composer: Tom Rizzo
- Country of origin: United States
- Original language: English
- No. of seasons: 5
- No. of episodes: 101 (list of episodes)

Production
- Executive producers: Billy Van Zandt; Jane Milmore (season 1); Rick Hawkins (season 2); Phil Kellard & Tom Moore (seasons 3–5)
- Production locations: Warner Bros. Studios, Burbank, California (taping location)
- Camera setup: Videotape; Multi-camera
- Running time: 21 minutes
- Production companies: BabyWay Productions; Next to Last Productions; Warner Bros. Television

Original release
- Network: The WB
- Release: January 11, 1995 – May 20, 1999

The Wayans Bros. is an American sitcom television series that aired on The WB from January 11, 1995, to May 20, 1999. The series starred real life brothers Shawn and Marlon Wayans, comedian John Witherspoon, and Anna Maria Horsford (season 2 onward).

== Premise ==
Shawn and Marlon Williams (Shawn Wayans and Marlon Wayans) are brothers who live in an apartment on 117th Street in Harlem. Shawn owns a local newsstand, where he and his brother Marlon work on a daily basis. Their father, John "Pops" Williams (John Witherspoon), owns a diner called Pop’s Diner (Pops' Joint (Season 1) where Marlon once worked (during season 1). Formerly located in Harlem, the restaurant was later moved downtown into the fictional Neidermeyer Building, in Rockefeller Center, where Shawn's newsstand is located and Dee Baxter (Anna Maria Horsford (onwards from Season 2)) works as a security guard.

== Cast ==
=== Main ===
- Shawn Wayans as Shawn Williams, a womanizing, stylish and responsible young bachelor and Marlon's older brother. He is an owner of his own local newsstand. Shawn cuts his hair offscreen in the Season 4 episode "Marlon's Return".
- Marlon Wayans as Marlon Williams, Shawn's dimwitted, immature, sex crazed, unsanitary and lazy younger brother, who also works at the newsstand. Marlon usually serves as the comic foil to big brother Shawn, often at times getting himself, or Shawn into tight spots. Marlon cuts his hair offscreen in the Season 3 episode "Grandma's in the Hiz-House".
- John Witherspoon as John "Pops" Williams, Shawn and Marlon's dysfunctional tacky father, who owns his locally famed diner, which is right by Shawn and Marlon's newsstand.
- Anna Maria Horsford as Deirdre "Dee" Baxter (seasons 2–5), the tough security guard and Shawn, Marlon and Pops' close friend.
- Lela Rochon as Lisa Saunders (season 1)
- Paula Jai Parker as Monique (season 2, episodes 1–11)
- Jill Tasker as Lou Malino (season 2, episodes 1–7)

=== Recurring ===
- Phill Lewis as Thelonious "T.C." Capricornio (seasons 2–5)
- Mitch Mullany as White Mike (season 2)
- Ja'Net DuBois as Grandma Ellington (seasons 3–4)
- Jermaine 'Huggy' Hopkins as Dupree (seasons 3–5)

== Episodes ==
| Season | Episodes | Originally released | |
| Season | Episodes | First released | Last released |
|---|---|---|---|
| 1 | 13 | January 11, 1995 | May 24, 1995 |
| 2 | 22 | September 6, 1995 | May 15, 1996 |
| 3 | 22 | September 4, 1996 | May 14, 1997 |
| 4 | 22 | September 17, 1997 | May 20, 1998 |
| 5 | 22 | September 17, 1998 | May 20, 1999 |

== Production ==
After In Living Color ended, Marlon Wayans said he was broke and barely had any money in the bank; he would sit at home on a computer, working on what would become The Wayans Bros. The idea was built around the real life chemistry between Shawn and Marlon as brothers, turning into a sitcom about two brothers, their father, and the kind of day to day family chaos and hustling that fit their style of comedy. The Wayans Bros was the first of the four sitcoms that aired as part of the original Wednesday night two hour lineup that helped launch the network (along with Unhappily Ever After, The Parent 'Hood, and the short-lived Muscle). While in development, the series' working title was Brother to Brother before the name of the series changed to The Wayans Bros.

The show was originally intended to air on NBC. Unfortunately, due to the fact that the network wanted Danny Glover to play the brothers’ father on the show instead, they decided not to move forward with the project. After NBC dropped the show, it was offered to ABC for a TGIF slot as The Wayans Bros. was produced by Warner Bros. Television which produced most of the shows on ABC's TGIF block. the call to ABC fell on deaf ears, so after both ABC and NBC rejected the show, WB network executives reached out to Marlon and said "We’ll take it.".

In the show's second season in 1995, Pops' Joint (the restaurant owned by Shawn and Marlon's father, John "Pops" Williams) was moved into the Neidermeyer Building, the location changed from Harlem to Rockefeller Center, Manhattan.

While the series did not end on a cliffhanger, it was cancelled in 1999 due to declining ratings and was not given a proper finale. In the horror comedy film Scary Movie (2000), Shawn Wayans' character, while furiously stabbing another character to death, breaks the fourth wall and says: "The Wayans Bros. was a good show, man! It was a good-ass show, and we didn't even get a final episode!"

== Theme music and opening sequence ==
The show's official opening title began with Shawn and Marlon on the steps of a brownstone apartment building, donning afros and wearing 1970s preppy attire, moving in rhythm to an accompanying satirical music piece that's supposed to have a 1970s-style "urban" sitcom theme song feel. Marlon forcefully smacks the camera, and then segues into "the real opening" of The Wayans Bros.

The scene then cuts to them with their normal clothes and trying to help an old woman who gets hit by a bus. The camera then shows the brothers inside the bus with the title of the show underneath them. The "second half" part of The Wayans Bros. theme song was changed twice throughout its four-year run (1995–1999). In the first two seasons, the show's theme song was A Tribe Called Quest's "Electric Relaxation".

In the third season, the theme song changed to a four-second hip hop beat. In the final two seasons, the show's theme song was changed again to a regular hip hop instrumental beat (which was produced by the Wayans Bros. & Omar Epps). In Brazilian reruns of seasons one and two episodes that have aired in SBT in 2015, this version replaced the seasons one and two sequence with the season three sequence.

== Syndication ==
Warner Bros. Domestic Television Distribution handles syndication distribution of the series. In September 1999, after the series was cancelled by The WB, the series began airing in off network syndication nationwide.

The first season DVD cover for The Wayans Bros.

At that same time, Chicago based national cable superstation WGN began airing reruns of the series, airing the series until 2002 (when its broadcast syndication run also ended); WGN (both the local Chicago feed and the national superstation feed) aired The Wayans Bros. in first run form from 1995 to 1999, when WGN (whose local Chicago feed was an affiliate of the network) carried WB programming nationally to make The WB available to markets where a local affiliate did not exist (The Wayans Bros. is one of three WB series to have aired on WGN in both first run and syndication form; The Parent 'Hood, 7th Heaven, and Sister, Sister being the others).

In 2006, reruns began airing on BET, after a four-year absence, where it ran until 2007. In 2007, reruns of the series aired on Ion Television where it ran until 2008. Since then, several Viacom networks, including MTV2, VH1, and BET Her have run the series in continuous rotation. As of 2023, reruns air frequently on VH1. It has also aired on Dabl, airing from May 6 to September 30, 2024 and made its return on October 6, 2025. All five seasons of the show were available to stream on HBO Max and BET+, but as of 2025, it isn't available on any streaming service.

== Home media ==
Warner Home Video released Season 1 of The Wayans Bros. on DVD in Region 1. Warner Archive subsequently released Seasons 2 to 5 on DVD in Region 1. The complete series was released on DVD in February 2025, 30 years after the show first aired.

| DVD name | Ep # | Release date |
|---|---|---|
| The Complete First Season | 13 | February 8, 2005 |
| The Complete Second Season | 22 | May 9, 2017 |
| The Complete Third Season | 22 | November 7, 2017 |
| The Complete Fourth Season | 22 | January 22, 2019 |
| The Complete Fifth Season | 22 | March 26, 2019 |
| The Complete Series | 101 | February 4, 2025 |
