= Ross Malinger =

American actor (born 1984)

- Born: Ross Aaron Malinger; July 7, 1984 (age 42); Redwood City, California, U.S.
- Occupations: Actor; salesman
- Years active: 1990–2006

Ross Aaron Malinger (born July 7, 1984) is an American former actor and automobile salesperson. He is best known for his roles as Jonah Baldwin in the 1993 movie Sleepless in Seattle, starring Tom Hanks, and as Bobby Jameson in the 1997 Disney comedy film Toothless, starring Kirstie Alley. He and Alley co-starred in the 1995 television film Peter and the Wolf, where Malinger played Peter. He played Adam Lippman, the Bar Mitzvah boy who liked Elaine's "Shiksa appeal", in the Seinfeld episode "The Serenity Now". He was also the original voice of T.J. Detweiler on the Disney animated TV series Recess.

== Early life ==
Ross Aaron Malinger was born on July 7, 1984, in Redwood City, California. He is the son of Laura, a producer, and Brian Malinger, a producer and sales representative. He has a brother, Tyler Cole Malinger, and a sister, Ashley Malinger, who are also actors. He earned an Associate degree after graduating from Moorpark College.

== Career ==
=== Guest appearances on television ===
He began his acting career at the age of six, appearing as a guest star on a 1990 episode of the Fox teen drama series Beverly Hills, 90210 as Elliott Brody. He then appeared on three episodes of the ABC sitcom Who's the Boss? in the same year. In 1991, he appeared on an episode of the sitcom Roseanne as Sammy Miller. He then appeared on an episode of the short-lived sitcom Davis Rules. In 1992, Malinger appeared on an episode of the BBC1 series In Sickness and in Health as Michael. He then appeared as Nicky on the ABC sitcom Maybe This Time. He appeared in two episodes of the CBS drama series Touched by an Angel in 1996 and 2001, respectively. In 1997, he made a guest appearance on the episode "The Serenity Now" on the NBC sitcom Seinfeld as Adam Lippman, a Bar Mitzvah boy who is the son of Mr. Lippman and likes Elaine's "Shiksa appeal". He then made a guest appearance on the NBC sitcom Suddenly Susan as Doug Naughton Jr. and in 1998, he appeared in the reality series The Simple Life as Will. He then appeared in the CBS legal drama series Family Law as Henry. In 2006, he made his final appearance on the CBS police procedural drama TV series Without a Trace as Jason McMurphy.

=== Film starring and appearances ===
Malinger's first film role was as Harvey in the 1990 action comedy film Kindergarten Cop, directed by Ivan Reitman and starring Arnold Schwarzenegger. He then appeared on the 1991 science fiction action thriller film Eve of Destruction as Timmy Arnold and appeared as young Donald Freeman on the science fiction drama film Late for Dinner. He starred in the romantic comedy-drama film Sleepless in Seattle opposite Tom Hanks and Meg Ryan as Jonah Baldwin, Sam's eight-year-old son who calls in to a radio talk show in an attempt to find his widowed father a new wife. He appeared in the 1995 romantic comedy film Bye Bye Love as Ben Goldman and was cast as Tyler McCord on the action thriller film Sudden Death in the same year. He starred in a lead role as Payton Shoemaker in the direct-to-video family film Little Bigfoot and starred as Bobby Jameson opposite Kirstie Alley in the television film Toothless, both in 1997. He starred in the 1998 film Frog and Wombat as Steve Johnson. His final film appearance was in the 2000 romantic film Personally Yours as Derek.

=== Television performances ===
His first main role was in the CBS sitcom Good Advice as Michael DeRuzza, the son of Susan (played by Shelley Long). He appeared as Steven Myers on the CBS Western drama series Dr. Quinn, Medicine Woman. From 1996 to 1997, he appeared in The WB television sitcom Nick Freno: Licensed Teacher as Tyler Hale. He appeared in a recurring role on the Fox teen drama series Party of Five as Jamie Burke, a friend and later love interest of Claudia Salinger (played by Lacey Chabert).

=== Voiceover roles in film, television, and television specials ===
His first voice role was as Peter in the 1995 animated TV special Peter and the Wolf on ABC. He also portrayed the character in the live-action scenes in the special. He then provided the voice of Spike on the 1996 adventure comedy film Homeward Bound II: Lost in San Francisco. In 1997, he provided additional voices in the radio series Adventures in Odyssey: In Harm's Way. Malinger then began voicing gang leader T.J. Detweiler on the Disney animated TV series Recess in the same year. After voice acting on the series' second season 1998 episode "Outcast Ashley", he quit the role due to his voice getting too low. He was then succeeded by Andrew Lawrence for the remainder of the series. He reprised his role in Recess Christmas: Miracle on Third Street and Recess: All Growed Down.

=== Retirement from acting and new career ===
Malinger has since retired from acting, and has worked at a series of car dealerships in the Greater Los Angeles area.

== Filmography ==
- Beverly Hills, 90210 (1990) – Elliott Brody
- Kindergarten Cop (1990) – Harvey
- Who's the Boss? (1990–1991) – Travis, Wild Kid #1, Rory
- Eve of Destruction (1991) – Timmy Arnold
- Late for Dinner (1991) – Little Donald Freeman
- Roseanne (1991) – Sammy Miller
- Davis Rules (1991) –
- In Sickness and in Health (1992) – Michael
- Sleepless in Seattle (1993) – Jonah Baldwin
- Good Advice (1993–1994) – Michael DeRuzza
- Bye Bye Love (1995) – Ben Goldman
- Dr. Quinn, Medicine Woman (1994–1995) – Steven Myers
- Sudden Death (1995) – Tyler McCord
- Peter and the Wolf (1995) – Peter (voice)
- Maybe This Time (1996) – Nicky
- Homeward Bound II: Lost in San Francisco (1996) – Spike (voice)
- Touched by an Angel (1996, 2001) – Jesse Bell, Nick Albright
- Nick Freno: Licensed Teacher (1996–1997) – Tyler Hale
- Little Bigfoot (1997) – Payton Shoemaker
- Toothless (1997) – Bobby Jameson
- Seinfeld (1997) – Adam Lippman
- Suddenly Susan (1997) – Doug Naughton Jr.
- Adventures in Odyssey: In Harm's Way (1997) – Additional voices
- Recess (1997–1998) – T.J. Detweiler (voice)
- The Simple Life (1998) – Will
- The Animated Adventures of Tom Sawyer (1998) – Tom Sawyer (voice)
- Club Vampire (1998) – Max
- Party of Five (1998) – Jamie Burke
- Frog and Wombat (1998) – Steve Johnson
- Family Law (1999) – Henry
- Personally Yours (2000) – Derek
- Recess Christmas: Miracle on Third Street (2001) – T.J. Detweiler (voice)
- Recess: All Growed Down (2003) – Older T.J. Detweiler (voice)
- Without a Trace (2006) – Jason McMurphy
