= 2015 deaths in American television =

The following deaths of notable individuals related to American television occurred in 2015.

== January ==
Date	Name	Age	Notability	Source
January 1	Donna Douglas	82	Actress, singer, and children's book author, best known as Elly May Clampett on The Beverly Hillbillies (other credits include playing the key character in The Twilight Zone episode "Eye of the Beholder", Love, American Style, Hee Haw and The Nanny)	
January 2	Robert Magruder	82	American actor and television/radio voiceover personality, known for his narration of the filmed investigations on Cheaters	
January 4	Stuart Scott	49	ESPN personality (anchor of SportsCenter, studio host for NFL and NBA coverage on both ESPN and ABC)	
January 8	Patsy Garrett	93	American actress	
January 8	Rod Taylor	84	Australian-born American actor (Credits include Hong Kong, Bearcats!, and The Oregon Trail)	
January 9	Bud Paxson	80	American radio and television owner and executive (founder of WNYP-TV/Jamestown, New York, Home Shopping Network, Paxson Communications and PAX TV)	
January 10	George Dickerson	81	American actor	
January 10	Taylor Negron	57	American actor, comedian, playwright, poet, and painter (Credits includes regular roles in So Little Time and Smart Guy; guest roles in Seinfeld, Friends, and Curb Your Enthusiasm)	
January 12	Darrell Winfield	85	Model and rancher known as the Marlboro Man in the 1960–1980s.	
January 13	H. Wesley Kenney	89	American producer and director, was executive producer for Days of Our Lives (1977–1979, also directed from 1968 to 1979); The Young and the Restless (1982–1987); General Hospital (1987–1989, was also head writer briefly during the 1988 WGA strike); and directed episodes of All in the Family.	
January 15	Sid Smith	93	American director and producer (All Star Revue, The Colgate Comedy Hour, The Jimmy Durante Show, The Ray Anthony Show and The Bell Telephone Hour) and several Bob Hope specials	
January 17	Don Harron	90	Canadian actor, writer, and radio personality (best known for appearances as Charlie Farquharson on Hee Haw)	
January 17	Greg Plitt	37	American fitness model and actor (starred in the Bravo series Work Out)	
January 18	Tony Verna	81	Producer/director (notably with CBS Sports and live events including Live Aid) and inventor of instant replay	
January 19	Walter Peregoy	89	American animator	
January 20	Bette Rogge	92	Talk show host	
January 22	Peggy Charren	86	Children's television advocate and co-founder of Action for Children's Television	
January 23	Barrie Ingham	82	English actor	
January 24	Joe Franklin	88	Host of The Joe Franklin Show, the longest continuously running talk show in television history, from 1950 to 1993	
January 26	Stephen R. Johnson	62	American director, animator and writer, directed episodes of Pee-Wee's Playhouse	
January 28	Tommie Manderson	102	English make-up artist	
January 30	Than Wyenn	95	American actor (Zorro, The Twilight Zone, Wanted: Dead or Alive, It Takes a Thief, Barnaby Jones, The Six Million Dollar Man and Quincy M.E.)	
January 31	Robert Blees	96	American writer and producer (Bus Stop, Combat!, Kraft Suspense Theatre, Bonanza and Project U.F.O.)	

== February ==
Date	Name	Age	Notability	Source
February 1	Edward De Blasio	88	American producer and writer known for Police Woman, Dynasty and In the Heat of the Night.	
February 1	Monty Oum	33	American animator and writer (RWBY)	
February 3	Mary Healy	96	American actress, known for Peter Loves Mary	
February 7	Joe Voci	51	American producer (High Society, Cupid, Mercy Point, Young Americans, Rude Awakening and Good Girls Don't)	
February 11	Lou Shaw	89	American writer and producer (The Rebel, Have Gun – Will Travel, McCloud, Beyond Westworld, Quincy M.E., The Fall Guy and Half Nelson)	
February 11	Bob Simon	73	Correspondent for CBS News (most notably for 60 Minutes)	
February 12	Gary Owens	80	American disc jockey and voice actor, was the announcer for Rowan & Martin's Laugh-In, other credits include Roger Ramjet, Space Ghost, Dynomutt, Dog Wonder, Garfield and Friends, Square One TV, and SWAT Kats: The Radical Squadron, also wrote for Jay Ward Productions and served as vice president of Gannett Company	
February 13	Stan Chambers	91	American reporter, worked at KTLA from 1947 to 2010.	
February 16	Lesley Gore	68	American singer/songwriter, actress, and LGBT activist (TV credits including Batman, In the Life, Murphy Brown, Hollywood Squares, All My Children (sister show to One Life to Live) and Days of Our Lives)	
February 19	Harris Wittels	30	American comedian, actor, writer, producer and musician. Writer for The Sarah Silverman Program, writer and executive producer for Parks and Recreation.	
February 20	Patricia Norris	83	American costume designer (Don't Be Afraid of the Dark, Helter Skelter, Sybil and The Waltons)	
February 21	Paul Napier	84	American actor (Felony Squad, The Mothers-In-Law, Knots Landing)	
February 23	Ben Woolf	34	American actor, best known for playing Meep in American Horror Story: Freak Show	
February 24	Maurice Hurley	75	American producer and writer (The Equalizer, Miami Vice, Star Trek: The Next Generation, Kung Fu: The Legend Continues, Pointman and Baywatch)	
February 24	Mirjana Puhar	19	American model and reality television participant (America's Next Top Model)	
February 25	Harve Bennett	84	American producer and writer (The Mod Squad, The Invisible Man, Rich Man, Poor Man, Gemini Man, The Six Million Dollar Man, The Bionic Woman, Salvage 1, Time Trax and Invasion America)	
February 27	Richard Bakalyan	84	American actor (The Untouchables, Batman, Walt Disney's Wonderful World of Color, Vega$ and Charlie's Angels)	
February 27	Leonard Nimoy	83	Television, film and stage actor, best known as Spock on the original Star Trek TV series and its film adaptations; other roles include the lead in the TV movie Baffled!, Morris Meyerson in A Woman Called Golda, Paris in Mission: Impossible, host of In Search of... and Standby...Lights! Camera! Action!, among numerous other roles	

== March ==
Date	Name	Age	Notability	Source
March 1	Daniel von Bargen	64	Actor, best known for recurring roles in Seinfeld, Malcolm in the Middle, Guiding Light and All My Children	
March 2	Jenna McMahon	89	Actress (The Funny Side, Love, American Style) and writer (The Carol Burnett Show, The Facts of Life, Mama's Family)	
March 3	Lynn Borden	77	American actress (Hazel)	
March 5	Gordon Kent		American writer, producer and animator (Alvin and the Chipmunks, CBS Storybreak, Teen Wolf, G.I. Joe: A Real American Hero, Garbage Pail Kids, Timeless Tales from Hallmark, Taz-Mania and Bonkers)	
March 6	John Siceloff	61	American journalist, was a longtime producer for PBS	
March 8	Sam Simon	59	American producer, director, and writer (Taxi, Cheers, It's Garry Shandling's Show, The Tracey Ullman Show, The Simpsons, The George Carlin Show and The Drew Carey Show)	
March 9	Eugene Patton	82	Stagehand at NBC Studios, Burbank and personality on The Gong Show ("Gene Gene the Dancing Machine"). First African American member of the International Alliance of Theatrical and Stage Employees, Local 33.	
March 10	Windell Middlebrooks	36	American actor, seen in Miller High Life beer ads and on several TV series (The Suite Life on Deck, Hannah Montana, My Name Is Earl, Chocolate News, Entourage, Scrubs, It's Always Sunny in Philadelphia, Body of Proof)	
March 11	Ralph Taeger	78	American actor, starred in the short-lived series Klondike, Acapulco and Hondo.	
March 11	William Beckley	85	American actor (Barnaby Jones and Dynasty)	
March 15	Sally Forrest	86	American actress	
March 17	Christie Schoen Codd	38	Husband-and-wife film/TV workers (Christie was an actress, stuntwoman, caterer and reality TV contestant; Joseph was a stage grip on TV and film projects)	
March 17	Joseph Codd	45	Husband-and-wife film/TV workers (Christie was an actress, stuntwoman, caterer and reality TV contestant; Joseph was a stage grip on TV and film projects)	
March 20	Lisa Colagrossi	49	News reporter on WABC-TV/New York City. Also worked at WKMG-TV/Orlando (where she won two local Emmy Awards); and WKYC-TV/Cleveland	
March 21	John Litvack	69	Director (soap operas including The Edge of Night and Guiding Light), producer (Hill Street Blues, Smallville), and executive with CBS, NBC, Walt Disney Television, and The WB	
March 21	Alberta Watson	60	Canadian actress (notable roles including La Femme Nikita, 24, and Nikita)	
March 25	George Fischbeck	92	TV meteorologist, most notably at KABC-TV from 1972 to 1990	
March 27	Rod Hundley	80	Former NBA player and broadcaster for the New Orleans/Utah Jazz, Phoenix Suns, Los Angeles Lakers, and TVS Television Network	
March 28	Richard L. Bare	101	Director/writer (work on several series, most notably The Twilight Zone and Green Acres)	

== April ==
Date	Name	Age	Notability	Source
April 2	Robert H. Schuller	88	American minister and televangelist (founder of Crystal Cathedral Ministries; co-host of the Hour of Power, 1970–2008)	
April 4	Lisa Simon	64	Producer/director, most notably for work on Sesame Street	
April 5	Richard Dysart	86	Actor, best known for his Emmy Award-winning role as Leland McKenzie on L.A. Law	
April 6	James Best	88	Actor, best known as Sheriff Rosco P. Coltrane on The Dukes of Hazzard	
April 6	Ray Charles	96	American musician, singer and songwriter; sang the theme song for Three's Company.	
April 6	Ben Powers	64	Actor, best known as Keith Anderson on Good Times	
April 7	Stan Freberg	88	Advertising executive, satirist and voice actor (participated in Time for Beany, developed commercials for Jeno's pizza rolls, Cheerios, Sunsweet prunes, Heinz soup, Jacobsen Mowers, and Encyclopædia Britannica)	
April 7	Geoffrey Lewis	79	Actor in film and television, including regular roles on Flo, Gun Shy, Falcon Crest, Land's End. Father of Juliette Lewis.	
April 21	Steve Byrnes	56	NASCAR reporter and announcer for TNN, CBS, and Fox Sports	
April 22	Lois Lilienstein	78	Musical performer who starred on The Elephant Show and Skinnamarink TV as a member of children's trio Sharon, Lois & Bram	
April 23	Sawyer Sweeten	19	Actor, best known as Geoffrey Barone on Everybody Loves Raymond	
April 25	Don Mankiewicz	93	American writer and novelist (Alcoa Presents: One Step Beyond, Armstrong Circle Theatre, Profiles in Courage and Ironside)	
April 26	Jayne Meadows	95	Stage, film, and television actress who had recurring appearances on I've Got a Secret and What's My Line?. Also appeared live in Las Vegas with her husband, Steve Allen.	
April 27	Suzanne Crough	52	Actress, best known as Tracy Partridge on The Partridge Family	
April 27	Verne Gagne	89	WWE Hall of Famer and co-founder of the American Wrestling Association	
April 30	Ben E. King	76	Singer whose Top 10 hit song "Stand by Me" was included in numerous TV shows including The X Factor, Late Show with David Letterman and So You Think You Can Dance, as well as a film of the same name	

== May ==
Date	Name	Age	Notability	Source
May 1	Grace Lee Whitney	85	Actress, best known as Yeoman Janice Rand on the original Star Trek TV series and its film adaptations; guest starring in General Hospital and Bewitched	
May 4	Ellen Albertini Dow	101	Guest roles on Loving and Another World; recurring roles on Santa Barbara and Guiding Light	
May 9	Elizabeth Wilson	94	American actress (East Side/West Side, Doc, Morningstar/Eveningstar and Delta)	
May 14	B.B. King	89	American Blues musician, guitarist, songwriter, radio personality, and actor (credits include The Cosby Show, The Young and the Restless, General Hospital, The Fresh Prince of Bel-Air, Sesame Street, Married... with Children, Sanford and Son and Touched by an Angel; voiceover work in Cow and Chicken and Between The Lions; musical performances on Austin City Limits; commercials for OneTouch Ultra and Toyota Camry)	
May 15	John Stephenson	91	Actor (The George Burns and Gracie Allen Show, Hogan's Heroes and other series) and voice artist (notably on The Flintstones, Jonny Quest, and The Transformers)	
May 20	Mary Ellen Trainor	62	American actress, had roles in Parker Lewis Can't Lose, Relativity and Roswell	
May 23	Anne Meara	85	American actress, singer, writer, producer and comedian, notably as part of the Stiller and Meara comedy team with husband Jerry Stiller, and the mother of Ben and Amy Stiller (Credits include solo regular and recurring roles in The Greatest Gift, The Paul Lynde Show, The Corner Bar, Kate McShane, Rhoda, Take Five with Stiller & Meara, Archie Bunker's Place, The Stiller and Meara Show, ALF, All My Children, The King of Queens, Sex and the City, Oz, and web series Stiller & Meara; TV movie roles in Ninotchka, Dames at Sea, The Other Woman, The Day They Came to Arrest the Book, Great Performances:"The Mother", What Makes a Family, Crooked Lines, and The Shallow End of the Ocean; voice work in Wonder Pets; guest roles in Love Boat, Murder, She Wrote, In the Heat of the Night, Will & Grace, Good Morning, Miami, Law & Order: Special Victims Unit, Four Kings, and Mercy)	
May 26	Dave Benton	52	News anchor at WCIA/Champaign, Illinois since 2005.	
May 29	Betsy Palmer	88	Film/TV actress (TV credits including As the World Turns, I've Got a Secret, Knots Landing, The Love Boat, and Newhart)	

== June ==
Date	Name	Age	Notability	Source
June 1	Katherine Chappell	29	Visual effects editor (Game of Thrones)	
June 6	Anthony Riley	28	American reality television contestant and singer who competed, then abruptly left, season 8 of The Voice after winning the first round.	
June 7	Christopher Lee	93	British character actor (Credits include guest hosting Saturday Night Live, How the West Was Won, Charlie's Angels, The Pirate, and a regular role in Street Gear)	
June 11	Dusty Rhodes	69	American wrestler, executive, manager and valet. A member of the WWE Hall of Fame	
June 12	Monica Lewis	93	American actress and singer, notable for being the voice of the Chiquita Banana girl (credits include The Ed Sullivan Show, Wagon Train, Night Gallery, The Virginian, Marcus Welby, M.D., Remington Steele, Ironside and Falcon Crest)	
June 18	Ralph J. Roberts	95	American business executive (co-founder of Comcast)	
June 18	Danny Villanueva	77	Former NFL kicker/punter; sports/news reporter for KMEX-TV and KNBC/Los Angeles; executive with KMEX and Spanish International Network/Univision	
June 20	Bob Barry, Jr.	58	American sports journalist (sports anchor, and later, sports director at KFOR-TV/Oklahoma City from 1982 to 2015)	
June 21	Darryl Hamilton	50	Former Major League Baseball player and analyst for MLB Network	
June 21	Tony Longo	53	American actor (roles include Alice, Hell Town, 1st & Ten, Police Academy: The Series, The Young and the Restless, Days of Our Lives and Alibi Boys)	
June 22	James Horner	61	American Oscar and Grammy Award-winning composer (Composed theme songs to CBS Evening News and Fish Police)	
June 23	Dick Van Patten	86	American television, film and stage actor, best known for playing Tom Bradford in Eight Is Enough (other credits include starring roles in Mama and When Things Were Rotten; and guest roles in Naked City, Happy Days, Sanford and Son, Adam-12, Love, American Style, The Love Boat, Hotel, Growing Pains, WIOU, Touched by an Angel, Boy Meets World, Arrested Development, That '70s Show and Hot in Cleveland)	
June 26	Chris Thompson	63	Writer/producer (work on several shows, most notably Bosom Buddies, The Larry Sanders Show, The Naked Truth, Action, and Shake It Up)	
June 28	Jack Carter	93	Comedian, actor, and television presenter	

== July ==
Date	Name	Age	Notability	Source
July 2	Charlie Sanders	68	NFL Hall of Fame tight end and TV analyst for the Detroit Lions.	
July 6	Jerry Weintraub	77	Film/TV producer (TV work including Behind the Candelabra, Years of Living Dangerously, The Brink, and Westworld)	
July 10	Roger Rees	71	Actor (recurring roles on several series, including Cheers, Boston Common, M.A.N.T.I.S., The West Wing, Warehouse 13, and Singles)	
July 14	Marlene Sanders	84	Correspondent and anchor for ABC News and CBS News	
July 15	Gary Mack	68	Held several jobs at KXAS-TV/Dallas–Fort Worth from 1981 to 1993 before becoming the archivist and curator of the Sixth Floor Museum at Dealey Plaza.	
July 17	Van Miller	87	Sportscaster; weather and sports anchor for WBEN-TV/WIVB/Buffalo from 1955 to 1998 and play-by-play man for Empire Sports Network. Better known for his radio career, where he announced the Buffalo Bills for a record 37 nonconsecutive years.	
July 18	Alex Rocco	79	Emmy-winning film, television, and voice character actor (Notable roles as Pete Karras in Three for the Road, Charlie Polniaczek in The Facts of Life, Al Floss in The Famous Teddy Z, Howie Rusco in Sibs, Roger Meyers, Jr. in The Simpsons, John Exstead Sr. in The Division, and Harry Rosetti in The George Carlin Show; other credits include Home Improvement, Batman, Cannon, The Mary Tyler Moore Show, Murphy Brown, Pinky and the Brain and Family Guy)	
July 18	George Coe	86	Actor (Cast member on Saturday Night Live, recurring roles on Archer, Working, L.A. Law, Max Headroom, Goodnight, Beantown, Hill Street Blues, Equal Justice, The West Wing)	
July 21	Theodore Bikel	91	Austrian-American actor	
July 23	Loredana Nesci	47	Lawyer who was the subject of her own Sundance Channel reality TV series Loredana, Esq.	
July 26	Bobbi Kristina Brown	22	Reality television personality, actress and singer (The Houstons: On Our Own); daughter of singers Whitney Houston and Bobby Brown	
July 28	James H. Allen	87	Children's host who portrayed the clown character "Rusty Nails" in the Portland, Oregon market; inspiration for Krusty the Clown on The Simpsons	
July 31	Gerald S. O'Loughlin	93	American actor (Men at Law, The Rookies, The Blue and the Gray, Automan, Our House, and Murder, She Wrote)	
July 31	Roddy Piper	61	WWE Hall of Fame wrestler and actor (guest spots and cameo appearances as himself on several shows)	

== August ==
Date	Name	Age	Notability	Source
August 3	Coleen Gray	92	Film and television actress who guest-starred in numerous series	
August 7	Terrence Evans	81	Actor who guested in episodes of numerous series, most notably Star Trek: Deep Space Nine ("Progress", "Cardassians") and Star Trek: Voyager ("Nemesis").	
August 9	Frank Gifford	84	Sports broadcaster (as part of Monday Night Football and CBS Sports), commercial pitchman, and actor; husband of TV host Kathy Lee Gifford	
August 10	Bob Briley	91	Reporter, anchor, and sports announcer in the Spokane radio and TV market, working at KHQ-TV and KXLY-TV (where he won a regional Emmy for his work at the latter)	
August 15	Julian Bond	75	American Civil Rights activist, politician in the Georgia House of Representatives and the Senate, president of the NAACP, the first president of the Southern Poverty Law Center, and journalist/commentator (first African-American politician to guest host Saturday Night Live on April 9, 1977, which became infamous for the "Black Perspective" skit with then-SNL cast member Garrett Morris; served as host of America's Black Forum from 1980 to 1997, commentator for The Today Show, narrated Eyes on the Prize in 1987 and 1990, and played himself in King)	
August 17	Yvonne Craig	78	American actress, singer, dancer, speaker and businesswoman (notable for her portrayal as Batgirl/Barbara Gordon on Batman; other credits include The Barbara Stanwyck Show, Death Valley Days, Hennesey, My Three Sons, The Many Loves of Dobie Gillis, Star Trek, The Man from U.N.C.L.E., The Wild Wild West, McHale's Navy, The Big Valley, The Ghost & Mrs. Muir, Land of the Giants, Love, American Style, Kentucky Jones, It Takes a Thief, The Mod Squad, Kojak, Emergency!, Love, American Style, The Six Million Dollar Man, and celebrity editions of Family Feud; voiceover work in Olivia.)	
August 18	Bud Yorkin	89	Producer/writer (several shows, most notably All in the Family, Maude, and What's Happening!!) and director (The Ford Show, An Evening with Fred Astaire)	
August 20	Melody Patterson	66	American actress, best known for her role as "Wrangler" Jane Angelica Thrift in F Troop; recurring roles on All My Children, One Life to Live, and Santa Barbara	
August 21	Tobias Strebel	35	Actor, singer/songwriter/musician, and reality television personality, whose plans to have plastic surgery in order to look like Justin Bieber was documented in Botched, and also appeared in My Strange Addiction	
August 24	Howard Lipstone	87	Producer and television executive	
August 30	Wes Craven	76	Horror film director, producer and writer (created the characters in the TV series Freddy's Nightmares and Scream)	

== September ==
Date	Name	Age	Notability	Source
September 1	Dean Jones	84	American actor known for Ensign O'Toole, The Chicago Teddy Bears, Herbie, the Love Bug, The Love Boat and Beethoven.	
September 3	Judy Carne	76	British actress best known as the "Sock it to me" Girl" on Rowan & Martin's Laugh-In	
September 6	Martin Milner	83	American actor known for Adam-12 and Route 66.	
September 8	Merv Adelson	85	American producer and co-founder of Lorimar Television. (producing credits include The Waltons, Eight Is Enough, Dallas, Knots Landing and Falcon Crest)	
September 10	John Connell	91	American actor best known for his role of Dr. David Malone in the soap opera Young Dr. Malone.	
September 12	Frank D. Gilroy	89	American playwright, screenwriter and producer; co-created Burke's Law	
September 19	Jackie Collins	77	English-born American author/novelist, television producer, television personality, and sister of Dynasty actress Joan Collins (notable works include seeing her best-selling novel Hollywood Wives adapted into a television miniseries; served as co-producer on her television adaptations of Lady Boss, Lucky Chances and Hollywood Wives: The New Generation; hosted the talk shows Jackie Collins' Hollywood and Jackie Collins Presents)	
September 20	Jack Larson	87	American actor, best known for his role of Jimmy Olsen in Adventures of Superman	
September 22	Yogi Berra	90	Hall of Fame American professional baseball player and coach for the New York Yankees and New York Mets. Notable work as contributor to numerous television baseball programs; host of Yogi & a Movie on YES Network; cameos in The Phil Silvers Show, Arli$$, Candid Camera, What's My Line, The Ed Sullivan Show and Colgate Comedy Hour; consultant on 61* and A Time for Champions; pitchman for Yoo-hoo and AFLAC; Rumored to be the inspiration for Yogi Bear that lead to a reported dispute with Hanna-Barbera, but later acknowledged as factual based on interviews.	
September 22	Mark Constantino		Husband and wife who appeared on Ghost Adventures as EVP experts and analysts	
September 22	Debby Constantino		Husband and wife who appeared on Ghost Adventures as EVP experts and analysts	
September 28	Catherine E. Coulson	71	Actress (the Log Lady on Twin Peaks) and camera/production assistant	
September 29	Pat Woodell	71	Actress (Bobbie Jo Bradley on Petticoat Junction)	

== October ==
Date	Name	Age	Notability	Source
October 3	Roger Bollen	74	American writer (ABC Weekend Special, Zenon: Girl of the 21st Century, Zenon: The Zequel, also co-created Handy Manny)	
October 3	Barbara Meek	81	American actress (Archie Bunker's Place, Melba and Big Brother Jake); guest roles on As the World Turns, General Hospital, and Guiding Light	
October 13	Jamie Zimmerman	31	Actress (7th Heaven, Boston Public), doctor and medical reporter for ABC News	
October 21	Marty Ingels	79	Comedian, actor (several roles, most notably I'm Dickens, He's Fenster), and voiceover artist (Cattanooga Cats, The Great Grape Ape Show, Pac-Man)	
October 30	Al Molinaro	96	Actor, best known as "Big Al" Delvecchio on Happy Days and its spin off Joanie Loves Chachi, Murray Greshler on The Odd Couple, and Joe Alberghetti on The Family Man	

== November ==
Date	Name	Age	Notability	Source
November 1	Fred Thompson	73	American senator and actor, best known as District Attorney Arthur Branch in the Law & Order franchise	
November 3	David Graham	91	American casting director (Three's Company, The Ropers and ABC Weekend Special)	
November 5	George Barris	89	American designer and builder of many Hollywood custom cars, most famously the Batmobile in the Batman series. Also built/designed the car from The Beverly Hillbillies, the Munster Koach and KITT's "Super Pursuit Mode" in Knight Rider	
November 5	Ritch Brinkley	71	American actor (Dolly, Beauty and the Beast, Thunder Alley, Saved by the Bell: The New Class, and Murphy Brown)	
November 11	Nathaniel Marston	40	Actor, best known as Michael McBain on One Life to Live	
November 14	Nick Bockwinkel	80	Wrestler	
November 16	David Canary	77	Actor who won five Daytime Emmy Awards for playing the Chandler twins (Adam and Stuart) on All My Children	
November 19	Rex Reason	87	American actor (Conflict, Man Without a Gun, The Alaskans and The Roaring 20's)	
November 20	Jim Perry	82	Game show host (Card Sharks, $ale of the Century)	
November 28	Marjorie Lord	97	Actress (Kathy Williams on Make Room for Daddy and Make Room for Granddaddy)	
November 30	Steve Shagan	88	American producer	

== December ==
Date	Name	Age	Notability	Source
December 1	Harry Radcliffe II	66	American producer, the first African American to head a CBS News bureau and served as a producer for 60 Minutes from 1995 to 2015.	
December 2	Ray Gandolf	85	Sports reporter/anchor for CBS News and ABC News; co-host of ABC's Our World	
December 4	Robert Loggia	85	American actor and director (Studio One in Hollywood, Walt Disney's Wonderful World of Color, T.H.E. Cat, Arthur Hailey's the Moneychangers, The Rockford Files, Emerald Point N.A.S., Magnum, P.I., Mancuso, FBI, Sunday Dinner, Wild Palms, The Sopranos and Queens Supreme)	
December 4	Chris Carney	35	American reality television personality and singer (twentyfourseven)	
December 6	Howard West	84	American producer and longtime agent for Jerry Seinfeld; served as executive producer for Seinfeld and The Marriage Ref	
December 7	Martin E. Brooks	90	American actor (Suspense, Studio One in Hollywood, Search for Tomorrow, General Hospital, Armstrong Circle Theatre, McMillan & Wife, The Six Million Dollar Man, The Bionic Woman, Dallas, Hunter and Knots Landing)	
December 7	Marque "Tate" Lynche	34	Actor (The Mickey Mouse Club) and singer (competed on season 3 of American Idol)	
December 12	Rose Siggins	43	American actress and disability activist, best known for portraying Legless Suzy in American Horror Story: Freak Show	
December 16	Adam Roth		American composer (Wreckreation Nation with Dave Mordal and Rescue Me)	
December 19	Louis DiGiaimo	77	American casting director and producer (Movin' On, Night Heat and Homicide: Life on the Street)	
December 20	Patricia Elliott	77	American actress best known for her role as Renée Divine Buchanan on One Life to Live (1987–2011)	
December 25	George Clayton Johnson	86	American writer (The Twilight Zone, Route 66, The Law and Mr. Jones, Kung Fu, Star Trek and co-wrote the novel Logan's Run, which inspired a miniseries of the same name)	
December 25	Jason Wingreen	95	Actor, best known as Harry Snowden on All in the Family and its spin-off, Archie Bunker's Place, also appeared in numerous episodes of The Twilight Zone	
December 27	Meadowlark Lemon	83	Basketball player (Harlem Globetrotters) and actor (appeared in Season 2 of Hello, Larry)	
December 31	Wayne Rogers	82	Actor, best known as "Trapper" John McIntyre on M*A*S*H, later became an investor and appeared as a panelist on Fox News Channel's Cashin' In	
December 31	Natalie Cole	65	R&B singer and actress (TV credits include Grey's Anatomy, Law & Order: Special Victims Unit and Livin' for Love: The Natalie Cole Story)	
December 31	Beth Howland	74	Actress, best known as Vera Gorman on Alice. Also had small roles in The Love Boat, Little House on the Prairie, Murder, She Wrote, The Mary Tyler Moore Show and Sabrina, the Teenage Witch	

== See also ==
- 2015 in American television
- Deaths in 2015
