= Animal Crackers =

Animal crackers are a snack of sweet crackers in animal shapes.

Animal Crackers may also refer to:

== Film and television ==
- Animal Crackers (1930 film), the 1930 Marx Brothers movie based on the Broadway play
- Animal Crackers (comic), any of several comic strips
- Animal Crackers (TV series), 1997 animated TV series based on one of the comic strips
- Animal Crackers (1937 comic strip), American newspaper comic strip
- Animal Kwackers, a 1975 British children's television series
- Animal Crackers (2017 film), an animated movie starring Ian McKellen, Danny DeVito, and Sylvester Stallone

== Music ==
- Animal Crackers (album), the first album by Wee Hairy Beasties
- The Animal Crackers (band), a Cincinnati, Ohio DJ group
- "Animal Crackers", tune by Duke Ellington
- Animal Crackers (musical), the 1928 Broadway play by George S. Kaufman and Morrie Ryskind starring the Marx Brothers
- "Animal Crackers in My Soup", a song sung by Shirley Temple in the 1935 movie Curly Top
- "Animal Crackers", a 1968 song by Melanie Safka
- "Animal Crackers", a 2021 song by BoyWithUke

== Other uses ==
- Animal Cracker Conspiracy Puppet Company, a puppet company co-founded by Iain Gunn and Bridget Rountree
- "The Animal-Cracker Plot", a science fiction short story written by L. Sprague de Camp
- An early development name for the puzzle game It's Mr. Pants
