= Rogge =

Rogge is a German and Dutch surname. It originates from the word rogge, meaning rye, and referring to a grower, baker or merchant of rye or rye bread. it may also be derived from a short version of the given name Roger. Notable people with the surname include:

- Bernhard Rogge (1899–1982), German naval officer
- Benjamin A. Rogge (1920–1980), American economist
- Bente Rogge (born 1997), Dutch water polo player
- Bette Rogge (1922–2015), American radio and television presenter, talk show host and journalist
- Clint Rogge (1889–1969), American baseball player
- Florence Rogge (1904–1992), American choreographer
- George Rogge (1907–1997), American football player
- Herbert Rogge (born 1947), West German handball player
- Jacques Rogge (1942–2021), Belgian sports administrator, 8th President of the International Olympic Committee
- Johan Randulf Rogge (1859–?), Norwegian politician
- Klaus Rogge (born 1979), German rower
- Kort Rogge (c.1425–1501), Swedish bishop
- Leslie Isben Rogge (born 1940), American bank robber
- Michael Rogge (born 1929), Dutch photographer, videographer and filmmaker
- Naomi Rogge (born 1999), American ice hockey forward
- O. John Rogge (1903–1981), U.S. attorney
- Rabea Rogge (born 1995), German electrical engineer, robotic researcher, polar scientist and private astronaut
- Rudolf Klein-Rogge (1885–1955), German film actor
- Sophie Rogge-Börner (1878–1955), German writer, feminist and nationalist
- Tim Rogge (born 1977), Belgian middle-distance runner
