= It's not easy being green (disambiguation) =

"It's not easy being green" is a phrase from the song "Bein' Green", originally sung by Kermit the Frog. The phrase may also refer to:

- It's Not Easy Being Green, a programme on BBC Two
- It's Not Easy Being Green (album), a 1999 pop album by the Filipino rock band, Rivermaya
- It's Not Easy Being Green (Once Upon a Time), a 2014 TV episode

== See also ==
- It's Not Easy Being...
- It's Not Easy Being a Bunny
- It's Not Easy Being Mean
