= List of Handy Manny episodes =

Handy Manny is an animated children's television series produced by Nelvana. The series premiered on September 16, 2006, originally as part of Disney Channel's Playhouse Disney daily block intended for preschoolers. On February 14, 2011, it was moved to the Disney Junior block, which served as Playhouse Disney's replacement. The series' final episode aired on February 14, 2013.

== Series overview ==
Season	Segments	Episodes		Originally released		
Season	Segments	Episodes		First released	Last released	Network
1	50	26		September 16, 2006	October 8, 2007	Playhouse Disney
2	74	40		October 27, 2007	October 4, 2009	Playhouse Disney
3	38	47	19	November 7, 2009	January 17, 2011	Playhouse Disney
3	54	47	27	February 14, 2011	February 14, 2013	Disney Junior

== Episodes ==
The episodes are listed in order of production. Episodes were directed by Charles E. Bastien.

=== Season 1 (2006–07) ===
No. overall	No. in season	Title	Written by	Storyboard by	Original release date	Prod. code
1	1	"Stretch's Cookies" / "Page Turner"	Jeff Wynne (Stretch's Cookies); David Hoselton (Page Turner)	Ted Bastien, Paul Bouchard, Genni Selby, John Flagg and Alex Szewczuk	September 16, 2006	102
Mrs. Portillo needs a new oven in time for a baking contest. But Manny and the tools have difficulty getting the oven inside due to its size, and it is up to Stretch to remedy the problem. / Turner thinks books are no more than a bunch of silly stories until the time comes for Manny to repair a turnstile at the library.
2	2	"A Sticky Fix" / "Paint Job"	Lorne Cameron	Ted Bastien, Paul Bouchard, Genni Selby, John Flagg and Alex Szewczuk	September 16, 2006	101
When Mr. Noodlander asks Manny to fix a broken good citizen trophy, Felipe and Turner end up getting glued together and have to learn to work as one to get the job done. / Manny and the tools are called in to help fix up the community center to surprise the kids in Sheet Rock Hills, but the tools learn that one should try painting without first being totally prepared.
3	3	"Tight Squeeze" / "Julieta's Monster"	David Hoselton (Tight Squeeze); Rick Gitelson (Julieta's Monster)	Ted Bastien, Paul Bouchard, Genni Selby, John Flagg and Alex Szewczuk	September 17, 2006	103
Squeeze is feeling glum about being the smallest tool, until she and Nelson save the day. / Señor Sanchez summons Manny and the tools. His granddaughter, Julieta, needs a light installed in her closet since she has a fear of darkness. She thinks there's a monster living in it. Manny and his tools build a mechanical dog named Fix-It and she was welcome.
4	4	"Tool in a China Shop" / "Welcome to Sheet Rock Hills"	Rick Gitelson	Ted Bastien, Paul Bouchard, Genni Selby, John Flagg and Alex Szewczuk	September 18, 2006	104
Pat has to fix the falling shelves at Mr. Kumar's China Shop. Of course, and the rest of the tools feel that Pat is too clumsy for the job. / When Manny and the tools are called by Mayor Rosa to repair the traffic light on Main Street, Squeeze gets stuck in a sewer while trying to get money for a pair of gloves for Manny. So Manny and the tools must rescue her.
5	5	"Pet Problem" / "Felipe's New Job"	Sheila Dinsmore (Pet Problem); Rick Gitelson (Felipe's New Job)	Ted Bastien, Paul Bouchard, Genni Selby, John Flagg and Alex Szewczuk	September 19, 2006	105
Manny gets called to repair a broken cage at Cassie's pet shop. But Squeeze accidentally lets the bunnies loose, and Manny and the tools must round them up. / A call comes in from Larry Laffler, the owner of the Laffler Toy Factory, requesting Manny's help with a repair on the front door lock. Felipe learns that all tools are required, no matter how often they're used.
6	6	"Rusty's Little Light Lie" / "Squeeze in a Pinch"	Michael Rabb (Rusty's Little Light Lie); Scott Gray (Squeeze in a Pinch)	Ted Bastien, Paul Bouchard, Genni Selby, John Flagg and Alex Szewczuk	September 20, 2006	106
Mayor Rosa asks Manny to install all the light bulbs in a new movie theater. When Rusty accidentally breaks the bulbs, he's reluctant to tell the truth. / Squeeze feels terrible when she accidentally pinches Manny's thumb during a repair. Afterwards, she starts to worry that she might hurt someone again.
7	7	"Rusty to the Rescue" / "Piñata Party"	Rick Gitelson (Rusty to the Rescue); Michael Rabb (Piñata Party)	Ted Bastien, Paul Bouchard, Genni Selby, John Flagg and Alex Szewczuk	September 21, 2006	107
Rusty learns to overcome his fear of climbing to help Alex down from a jungle gym at the school playground. / It's Manny's birthday and the tools plan on making it special — until Sam from the Bike Shop asks Manny on the phone to repair a bicycle pump.
8	8	"Pat the Screwdriver" / "Big Sister"	Rick Gitelson (Pat the Screwdriver); Sharon Schatz Rosenthal (Big Sister)	Ted Bastien, Paul Bouchard, Genni Selby, John Flagg and Alex Szewczuk	September 23, 2006	108
After Pat ends up getting bonked on the head, he then comes down with amnesia and thinks that he is a screwdriver. / Manny must help Mr. Alvarez's daughter Susana overcome her worries that her parents will no longer need her once her younger sister arrives.
9	9	"Supremoguy" / "Tool Talk"	Sheila Dinsmore (Supermoguy); Michael Rabb (Tool Talk)	Ted Bastien, Paul Bouchard, Genni Selby, John Flagg and Alex Szewczuk	September 30, 2006	109
Felipe pretends to act as his favorite comic book superhero, Supremoguy, but his acting goes way too far when he begins to hog the other tools' jobs. / While on a repair at the Sheet Rock Hills Mini Golf Course, the tools meet the owner Miguel Salazar, who seems to ignore them whenever they try to talk to him. But Miguel is actually deaf, and they must communicate using sign language.
10	10	"Amigo Grande" / "Tool for Sale"	Jonathan Taylor (Amigo Grande); Sheila Dinsmore (Tool for Sale)	Ted Bastien, Paul Bouchard, Genni Selby, John Flagg and Alex Szewczuk	October 7, 2006	110
Manny and the tools are summoned by Mr. Chu, the school principal to assemble a new flagpole. But they realize they can't do it without the help of a mobile crane named Amigo Grande. / The tools are very tired from staying up all night playing checkers, and are fast asleep on the couch at Manny’s Workshop. At a yard sale, Pat accidentally ends up in the wrong toolbox after accidentally falling fast asleep in it.
11	11	"Shoe Biz" / "The New Kid"	David Hoselton (Shoe Biz); Sharon Schatz Rosenthal (The New Kid)	Ted Bastien, Paul Bouchard, Genni Selby, John Flagg and Alex Szewczuk	October 14, 2006	111
Manny and the tools are about to build a new sign for Sherman's shoe store when they realize that all the store really needs is organization. / Marcelo has moved to Sheet Rock Hills from Argentina and is afraid that he won't make any new friends.
12	12	"Time Out" / "Shine Bright"	David Hoselton (Time Out); Sheila Dinsmore (Shine Bright)	Ted Bastien, Paul Bouchard, Genni Selby, John Flagg and Alex Szewczuk	October 21, 2006	114
Manny and the tools discover that the City Hall clock tower is running an hour slow—and so is almost everyone in town. / Manny and the tools are called in to fix the faulty defective spotlights at Sheet Rock Hills Elementary School.
13	13	"Not So Fast Food" / "Merry-Go-Round"	David Hoselton (Not So Fast Food); Douglas Wood (Merry Go Round)	Ted Bastien, Paul Bouchard, Genni Selby, John Flagg and Alex Szewczuk	November 11, 2006	116
Fast Eddie calls up Manny and the tools to make a repair from the order box at the drive-through. / Mayor Rosa asks Manny and the tools to tear down the broken merry-go-round in the park. But the idea upsets Kelly and the rest of the townspeople, so Manny must think of a solution.
14	14	"Wonder Tool" / "Tool Games"	John Reynolds (Wonder Tool); Fred Stoller (Tool Games)	Ted Bastien, Paul Bouchard, Genni Selby, John Flagg and Alex Szewczuk	November 25, 2006	117
A salesman convinces Manny to try out the new Wonder Tool 3000, but the device doesn't exactly "work wonders" as he thinks. / Rusty learns you never know what's out there and what you might excel at when Manny and the tools do a repair at a carnival.
15	15	"A Very Handy Holiday"	Rick Gitelson	Ted Bastien, Paul Bouchard, Genni Selby, John Flagg and Alex Szewczuk	December 16, 2006	113
Manny and the tools have emergency repairs to make all over town before they can attend a holiday party.
16	16	"Uncle Manny" / "Kitty Sitting"	Sheila Dinsmore (Uncle Manny); Michael Rabb (Kitty Sitting)	Ted Bastien, Paul Bouchard, Genni Selby, John Flagg and Alex Szewczuk	January 13, 2007	118
Manny and the tools try to keep Manny's nephew Chico away from the workbench while they baby-sit him. / Señor Sanchez looks after a kitten and forms a bond with it.
17	17	"Detective Dusty" / "Radio Rusty"	Sheila Dinsmore (Detective Dusty); Story by : Sheila Dinsmore; Teleplay by : David Hoselton (Radio Rusty)	Ted Bastien, Paul Bouchard, Genni Selby, John Flagg and Alex Szewczuk	January 27, 2007	120
Mrs. Portillo thinks her dryer is eating her socks, but Dusty finds clues that tell a different story. / When Manny and the tools go to the local radio station for a repair, Rusty reluctantly takes over for Jack Stack.
18	18	"Join the Club" / "Manny's Sick Day"	Scott Gray (Join the Club); Michael Rabb (Manny's Sick Day)	Ted Bastien, Paul Bouchard, Genni Selby, John Flagg and Alex Szewczuk	February 10, 2007	121
Manny helps repair a treehouse for Alex, Kyle, and Quinn and teaches them that clubs should be about including people, not excluding them. / Manny has come down with a cold and the tools decide it's their job to help him feel better by having Kelly, Mr. Lopart, Mrs. Portillo, and Sherman to help too as well.
19	19	"Felipe Strikes Out" / "Pat's Big Idea"	David Hoselton (Felipe Strikes Out); Susan Kim (Pat's Big Idea)	Ted Bastien, Paul Bouchard, Genni Selby, John Flagg and Alex Szewczuk	April 14, 2007	123
Felipe mistakenly receives credit for Turner's bowling alley repair. / Turner is annoyed and everyone else amused by Pat's unconventional way of problem-solving saving the day.
20	20	"Cinco-de-Mayo" / "The Best Repairman"	Michael Rabb (Cinco de Mayo); Scott Gray (Best Repairman)	Ted Bastien, Paul Bouchard, Genni Selby, John Flagg and Alex Szewczuk	May 5, 2007	112
Manny must repair Mrs. Portillo's sink before celebrating Cinco De Mayo. / Manny is voted the county's best repairman by the town newspaper. Manny attempts to fix the fountain while getting an interview, but not if his tools, who are all excited about being in the newspaper, have something to say about that.
21	21	"Mr. Lopart's Mother" / "Gopher Help"	Rick Gitelson (Mr. Lopart's Mother); Michael Rabb (Gopher Help)	Ted Bastien, Paul Bouchard, Genni Selby, John Flagg and Alex Szewczuk	May 13, 2007	125
Mr. Lopart's mother, Mrs. Lopart, calls on Manny to help her build a mantle for her fireplace, but Mr. Lopart becomes jealous, and thinks his mother doesn't think he's handy anymore, so he tries to prove it by helping Manny and the tools. / When the local park has a gopher problem, the park keeper Jackie Greenway calls on Manny and the tools to help catch the gopher.
22	22	"A Very Handy Vacation"	Rick Gitelson	Ted Bastien, Paul Bouchard, Genni Selby, John Flagg and Alex Szewczuk	June 23, 2007	119
When Abuelito convinces Manny to take a trip to Lake Nochanailin, he decides to take a summer vacation without his tools.
23	23	"Abuelito's Garden" / "Firehouse Tools"	Sheila Dinsmore (Abuelito's Garden); Michael Rabb (Firehouse Tools)	Ted Bastien, Paul Bouchard, Genni Selby, John Flagg and Alex Szewczuk	July 14, 2007	122
Manny tries to get Abuelito out into his garden for some fresh air and exercise. But Abuelito's so tired, he can't do either of them. / Manny and the tools are called to the local firehouse where, during a repair of the firehouse bell, they learn all about fire safety.
24	24	"Musica" / "Ice Cream Team"	Michael Rabb (Musica); Sheila Dinsmore (Ice Cream Team)	Ted Bastien, Paul Bouchard, Genni Selby, John Flagg and Alex Szewczuk	September 15, 2007	115
Manny's photo album reflects on how Manny became a handyman. / Manny and the tools try to fix the freezer in an ice cream stand before all the ice cream melts.
25	25	"Halloween" / "Squeeze's Magic Show"	Story by : Rick Gitelson & Bill Canterbury; Teleplay by : Rick Gitelson (Halloween); Jeff Wynne (Squeeze's Magic Show)	Ted Bastien, Paul Bouchard, Genni Selby John Flagg and Alex Szewcuzk	October 8, 2007	126
Mayor Rosa is having a Halloween party until Manny gets a call from Victor, who works at the costume shop, whose sewing machine is broken as Mr. Lopart wants to dress up as a superhero. When he later enters the sewing shop, Mr. Lopart learns that Victor's machine is broken and it is up to Manny and the tools to help Victor and Mr. Lopart. / Manny and the tools go to fix Magic Marty's magic box and are treated to some of his magic tricks.
26	26	"Squeeze's Day Off" / "Renaldo's Pretzel Castle"	Peter Hunziker (Squeeze's Day Off); Fred Stoller (Renaldo's Pretzel Castle)	Ted Bastien, Paul Bouchard, Genni Selby, John Flagg, Alex Szewczuk & Kathy Paulin-Lougheed	November 17, 2007	124
Manny and the tools want to spend their downtime catching up on hobbies except for anxious Squeeze. / When Manny is called to fix the big pretzel on top of "Renaldo's Pretzel Castle", he and the tools then realize that they have to do more than just repair it. Note: This episode "Squeeze's Day Off" was first released as a never before seen episode on the Handy Manny: Tooling Around DVD on August 21, 2007. It was released 3 months before it premiered on television.

=== Season 2 (2007–09) ===
All episodes are directed by Charles E. Bastien.

No. overall	No. in season	Title	Written by	Storyboard by	Original release date	Prod. code
27	1	"Haunted Clock Tower" / "Oscar's House of 18 Smoothies"	Sheila Dinsmore (Clock Tower); Fred Stoller (Oscar's House of 18 Smoothies)	Paul Bouchard, Mitch Manzer, Genni Selby & Alex Szewczuk	October 27, 2007	207
Manny and the tools got a call from Mayor Rosa and she thinks that the clock tower may be haunted by those unusual weird sounds. However, there's a simple logical explanation by noticing there's a broken glass window due to the storm last night. / While repairing the counter at Oscar's new business "Oscar’s House of 18 Smoothies", the tools discover Oscar made a mistake and actually only offers seventeen smoothies on the menu. As a result, they must now help make a new flavor for the 18th flavor to add it to the menu before the grand opening starts. Notes: first episode to feature Oscar.
28	2	"Light Work" / "Abuelito's Tomatés"	Rick Gitelson (Light Work); Laurie Israel & Rachel Ruderman (Abuelito's Tomatés)	Paul Bouchard, Mitch Manzer, Genni Selby & Alex Szewczuk	November 10, 2007	203
Manny and the tools must figure out a way to repair Mrs. Portillo's chandelier in the darkness safely and carefully, ensuring that it doesn't shattered. / Manny and the tools fix a fence around Abuelito's yard to keep out the neighbor’s dog Chulo from eating his prize-winning tomatoes. In the end, he noticed that Chulo wanted to play with Abuelito because he thought that a tomato was a ball and he was hungry for tomatoes. Also, the tools and Abuelito both learned a valuable lesson about the importance of finding out all of the facts before you blame someone; otherwise, you'll end up risking jumping to conclusions and making false accusations. Notes: First episode to feature Chulo
29	3	"All Tools on Deck" / "Tool Dance"	Michael G. Stern (All Tools on Deck); Michael Rabb (Tool Dance)	Paul Bouchard, Mitch Manzer, Genni Selby & Alex Szewczuk	December 15, 2007	205
Manny and the tools return to Lake Nochanailin to fix a messed-up cabin door until three of the tools get stranded in the middle of the lake. / Manny and the tools have to repair a disco ball light at the Sheet Rock Hills dance studio.
30	4	"Elliot Minds the Store" / "Squeeze Makes a Promise"	Lorne Cameron (Elliot Minds the Store); Michael Rabb (Squeeze Makes a Promise)	Paul Bouchard, Mitch Manzer, Genni Selby & Alex Szewczuk	January 12, 2008	201
When Kelly leaves her brother Elliot in charge of her hardware store, Manny and the tools must help him out. / Squeeze volunteers to take care of Mrs. Portillo's pet chameleon, Maurice, and promises to keep the lid closed on the tank.
31	5	"Manny to the Rescue" / "Handy Hut"	Rick Gitelson (Manny to the Rescue); Sheila Dinsmore (Handy Hut)	Paul Bouchard, Mitch Manzer, Genni Selby & Alex Szewczuk	January 21, 2008	202
Manny gets a call from fire chief Eduardo to repair the flashing lights on top of his fire truck. / Manny worries he is being replaced when a new repair shop moves into town and his jobs seemingly begin to disappear. In the end, he and the Tools realize that Handy Hut is a glove store.
32	6	"Valentine's Day" / "Mr. Lopart Moves In"	Lorne Cameron (Valentine's Day); Sheila Dinsmore (Mr. Lopart Moves In)	Paul Bouchard, Mitch Manzer, Genni Selby & Alex Szewczuk	February 14, 2008	214
When Manny and the tools are asked to assemble a robot for a Valentine's Day gift, they learn that it's the thought that counts. / Mr. Lopart moves his stuff into Manny's repair shop after his candy store becomes flooded.
33	7	"Tools for Toys" / "Manny's Mouse Traps"	Michael Maurer (Tools for Toys); Sheila Dinsmore (Manny's Mouse Traps)	Paul Bouchard, Mitch Manzer, Genni Selby & Alex Szewczuk	February 25, 2008	204
When Manny is called to fix Mr. Singh's swing set, the tools discover Mr. Singh is too busy to play with his daughter Leela. / Manny and the tools find a way to remove a speedy little mouse from Mrs. Portillo's bakery.
34	8	"Skateboard Park" / "Cowboy Manny"	Rick Gitelson (Skateboard Park); Michael Rabb (Cowboy Manny)	Paul Bouchard, Mitch Manzer, Genni Selby & Alex Szewczuk	March 8, 2008	208
When skateboarders get in the way of the pedestrians that want to walk in the park, Manny comes up with a solution. / Manny and the tools take a trip out to a real western ranch where they learn first hand about life as a cowboy.
35	9	"Ups and Downs" / "Bloomin' Tools"	Scott Gray (Ups and Downs); Michael Rabb (Bloomin' Tools)	Paul Bouchard, Mitch Manzer, Genni Selby & Alex Szewczuk	March 22, 2008	209
Manny gets stuck inside of an elevator. / Manny and the tools bring a part of nature into Jackie's new home.
36	10	"Squeeze Sticks" / "Basketball for All"	Scott Gray (Squeeze Sticks); William H.K. Mooney & David Pitlik (Basketball for All)	Paul Bouchard, Mitch Manzer, Genni Selby & Alex Szewczuk	April 12, 2008	211
Manny and the tools got a call from Mr. Alvarez in the park; he's planning Susanna's birthday party today, but he accidentally broke the carousel, which won't stop spinning, and they have to fix it before her party starts. While at Kelly's hardware store, Squeeze disobeys Manny's advice about magnets stick to metal objects and gets a magnet stuck to her. / Coach Johnson calls Manny to help fix the basketball hoop so the kids can practice for an upcoming tournament.
37	11	"Sculptor Manny" / "Manny Goes Solar"	Sheila Dinsmore (Sculptor Manny); Michael Rabb (Manny Goes Solar)	Paul Bouchard, Mitch Manzer, Genni Selby & Alex Szewczuk	April 22, 2008	215
While helping clean out Carmela's art studio, Felipe accidentally "recycles" her sculpture. / Manny and the tools get a call from Mr. Kumar to come and install a new sign for his store.
38	12	"Talent Show" / "Abuelito's Yard Sale"	Rick Gitelson (Talent Show); Laurie Israel & Rachel Ruderman (Abuelito's Yard Sale)	Paul Bouchard, Mitch Manzer, Genni Selby & Alex Szewczuk	May 10, 2008	212
Sheet Rock Hills is getting ready for an upcoming talent show. But the piano doesn't sound quite right, and Manny and the tools will need to look into the matter. / At a yard sale, the tools mistakenly sell Abuelito’s beloved rocking chair to Mr. Lopart.
39	13	"Lost and Found" / "Science Fair"	Scott Gray (Lost and Found); Michael G. Stern (Science Fair)	Paul Bouchard, Mitch Manzer, Genni Selby & Alex Szewczuk	May 31, 2008	216
Manny finds a mysterious gold coin at the laundromat and tries to find out who lost it. / While racing to fix a broken air conditioner at the school Science Fair, Felipe accidentally damages several of the science projects.
40	14	"Sizing Things Up" / "Mr. Ayala's New Car Wash"	Scott Gray (Sizing Things Up); Laurie Israel & Rachel Ruderman (Mr. Ayala's New Car Wash)	Paul Bouchard, Mitch Manzer, Kris Pern, Genni Selby & Alex Szewczuk	June 15, 2008	220
Manny and the tools need to fix Abuelito's leaky skylight before a big rainstorm hits. / Manny and the tools repair a broken breaker switch that's shut down the power in Mr. Ayala's new car wash on opening day. But then they discover another problem: Fix-It's in the back of Manny's truck, about to go through the car wash.
41	15	"Happy Birthday, Mr. Lopart" / "Scout Manny"	Michael Rabb (Happy Birthday, Mr. Lopart); Sheila Dinsmore (Scout Manny)	Paul Bouchard, Mitch Manzer, Genni Selby & Alex Szewczuk	June 28, 2008	210
Just when Mr. Lopart is convinced that everyone forgot his birthday, his mother, Manny and all the neighbors surprise him with a party. / Manny, the tools, and Mr. Ayala take their scout group camping for the weekend.
42	16	"Felipe's Hiccups" / "Book Drop"	Michael G. Stern (Felipe's Hiccups); Jeff Wynne (Book Drop)	Paul Bouchard, Mitch Manzer, Genni Selby & Alex Szewczuk	July 21, 2008	213
Manny and the tools must set up a sound system at the Community Center, but to do the job, they need to cure Felipe's hiccups. / Manny is called by Marion the Librarian to fix the book drop at the library.
43	17	"Bingo Night" / "Scribble Trouble"	Laurie Israel & Rachel Ruderman (Bingo Night); Mike Rabb (Scribble Trouble)	Paul Bouchard, Mitch Manzer, Kris Pern, Genni Selby & Alex Szewczuk	August 30, 2008	218
Manny and the tools show up in the community center for Bingo Night, but when the bingo ball cage breaks, Turner forgets that games are supposed to be fun. / Manny’s nephew, Chico, has a bad habit of writing and painting on the walls.
44	18	"Abuelito's Telescope" / "Little Lopart"	Sheila Dinsmore (Abuelito's Telescope); Fred Stoller (Little Lopart)	Paul Bouchard, Mitch Manzer, Kris Pern, Genni Selby & Alex Szewczuk	September 19, 2008	222
While Manny and the tools set out to fix Abuelito's telescope, they spot something white float. / When Mrs. Lopart gets stuck in her own attic along with Mr. Lopart, Manny, and the tools, she tells a story to Manny about Mr. Lopart as a child.
45	19	"The Big Picture" / "Dig It"	Scott Gray (The Big Picture); Sheila Dinsmore (Dig It)	Paul Bouchard, Mitch Manzer, Kris Pern, Genni Selby & Alex Szewczuk	September 26, 2008	219
Manny and the tools build a scaffold so Carmela the artist can finish painting a mural at city hall. / Manny and the tools venture out to an archaeological dig site where they rebuild a piece of history when they piece together an ancient pot.
46	20	"Learning to Fly" / "Tools in the Candy Shop"	Michael G. Stern (Learning to Fly); William H.K. Mooney & David Pitlik (Tools in the Candy Shop)	Paul Bouchard, Mitch Manzer, Kathy Paulin-Lougheed, Genni Selby & Alex Szewczuk	October 3, 2008	223
Manny and the tools repair a hot air balloon. / Mr. Lopart asks Manny to cover the shop while he goes to the dentist.
47	21	"Pedal'n Tools" / "Cock-a-Doodle-Do"	Michael Rabb (Pedal'n Tools); Chara Campanella (Cock-a-Doodle-Do)	Paul Bouchard, Mitch Manzer, Kris Pern, Genni Selby & Alex Szewczuk	October 10, 2008	226
Manny and the tools fix up an old bicycle and plan to ride it in the park. / Elliot has a new rooster, whose crowing is waking up everyone in town.
48	22	"Bake Sale" / "Camping Tools"	Laurie Israel & Rachel Ruderman (Bake Sale); Michael Rabb (Camping Tools)	Charles E Bastien, Paul Bouchard, Mitch Manzer, Genni Selby & Alex Szewczuk	October 15, 2008	221
When pastries at Miss Hillary's bake sale are ruined, Manny and the tools rush to replenish the supply. / Manny fixes Mrs. Lee's garage door so she can get her tent out. Notes: Oscar are cameo appearances
49	23	"Flicker" / "Manny's Time Capsule"	Rick Gitelson (Flicker); William H.K. Mooney & David Pitlik (Manny's Time Capsule)	Paul Bouchard, Mitch Manzer, Genni Selby & Alex Szewczuk	December 1, 2008	228
A new flashlight named Flicker joins Manny's tool family and proves to be helpful when his new motorcycle breaks down during nightfall. / Mayor Rosa asks Manny and the tools to fix a leak that threatens to interfere with Sheet Rock Hills' 100th anniversary.
50	24	"Have a Handy New Year"	Sheila Dinsmore	Paul Bouchard, Mitch Manzer, Genni Selby & Alex Szewczuk	December 2, 2008	229
Manny and the tools help with the New Year celebration at Sheet Rock Hills park. Mr. Lopart tries to help them until something starts going wrong.
51	25	"Movie Night" / "Cactus Manny"	Michael G. Stern (Movie Night); Michael Rabb (Cactus Manny)	Paul Bouchard, Mitch Manzer, Genni Selby & Alex Szewczuk	December 3, 2008	230
Manny and the tools volunteer to fix a broken movie projector. / Mayor Rosa has asked all of her friends and neighbors to conserve water.
52	26	"Frank's Barber Shop" / "Rusty's Second Wind"	Chara Campanella (Frank's Barber Shop); Michael G. Stern (Rusty's Second Wind)	Paul Bouchard, Mitch Manzer, Genni Selby & Alex Szewczuk	December 4, 2008	232
Frank, the new barber in town, needs Manny to fix his broken barber pole. / Señor Lopez, the Sheet Rock Hills Elementary School science teacher, asks Manny and the Tools to repair a weathervane at the radio station so he can know if the rainstorm is moving toward them or not. But Rusty is way too scared of the thunder to help with the repair, so Manny tries to help him overcome his fear.
53	27	"Special Delivery" / "Elliot's New Job"	Cynthia Riddle (Special Delivery); Sheila Dinsmore (Elliot's New Job)	Paul Bouchard, Mitch Manzer, Genni Selby & Alex Szewczuk	March 28, 2009	233
Stretch falls inside a mail chute at the post office while looking for a package. / Elliot starts a new job at a movie rental store and the tools help him out.
54	28	"Arbor Day" / "Flicker Speaks English"	Chara Campanella (Arbor Day); Michael Rabb (Flicker Speaks English)	Paul Bouchard, Mitch Manzer, Genni Selby & Alex Szewczuk	April 18, 2009	237
When there is an ailing tree in the park, Manny and the tools help Jackie transplant it. / When Flicker wants to learn English, he and the other tools find out that mastering a new language is not easy.
55	29	"Home Sweet Home" / "Jackie's Old Shed"	Shelia Dinsmore (Home Sweet Home); Jeff Wynne (Jackie's Old Shed)	Paul Bouchard, Mitch Manzer, Genni Selby & Alex Szewczuk	April 18, 2009	224
Manny and the tools are sad to learn the Alvarez family is thinking of moving away to a bigger house. / Manny and the tools see Jackie working hard to collect recyclables overflowing from the park's recycling bins.
56	30	"Danny Starr" / "Quinceanera"	Michael Rabb (Danny Starr); Laurie Israel & Rachel Ruderman (Quinceanera)	Paul Bouchard, Mitch Manzer, Genni Selby & Alex Szewczuk	June 20, 2009	227
Manny and the tools help Danny Starr before his concert in the park. / A broken ceiling fan blows the petals off a flower centerpiece shortly before a party.
57	31	"The Good, the Bad and the Handy"	Michael G. Stern	Paul Bouchard, Mitch Manzer, Genni Selby & Alex Szewczuk	June 27, 2009	239
Manny and the tools learn about life in the Old West while repairing a stone well from that era.
58	32	"Lyle and Leland Lopart" / "Blackout on the Block"	Rick Gitelson (Lyle and Leland Lopart); Jeff Wynne (Blackout on the Block)	Paul Bouchard, Dimitri Kostic, Mitch Manzer, Genni Selby & Alex Szewczuk	July 4, 2009 (Note: Both episodes was first released in Manny's Pet Roundup DVD on August 5, 2008.)	206
Manny helps Mr. Lopart's nephews build a cart to compete in the soap box derby. / When a blackout occurs one evening, Manny and the tools check to see that everyone on the block is okay.
59	33	"A Day at the Beach" / "The Party Dress"	Scott Gray (A Day at the Beach); Laurie Israel & Rachel Ruderman (The Party Dress)	Paul Bouchard, Mitch Manzer, Genni Selby & Alex Szewczuk	July 11, 2009	231
While at the beach, Manny and the tools must fix the lifeguard tower without any supplies. / When Kelly's special dress gets stuck high up on a broken rack at Mrs. Thompson's cleaners, Manny must find a way to get it down in time for that afternoon's tardeada.
60	34	"Manny's Makeover" / "Singing Salon"	Sheila Dinsmore (Manny's Makeover); Peter Hunziker (Singing Salon)	Paul Bouchard, Mitch Manzer, Genni Selby & Alex Szewczuk	July 18, 2009	234
Mrs. Lopart gives Manny and the tools a makeover when he accidentally ruins his shirt while working at her house. / When the record player at the Singing Salon breaks, crooning hairstylist Aurelia is left unable to sing or do haircuts. Manny and the tools must try and find a way to fix the record player.
61	35	"A Night With Abuelito" / "Canine Case"	Jeff Wynne (A Night With Abuelito); Sheila Dinsmore (Canine Case)	Paul Bouchard, Mitch Manzer, Genni Selby & Alex Szewczuk	July 25, 2009	225
Manny and the tools visit Abuelito's house, but a snowstorm traps them there. / Dusty reprises her role as a detective in order to help Officer Pete, Manny, and the tools find Mrs. Portillo's beloved dog, Carlos.
62	36	"Saving the Turtles" / "Abuelito's Siesta"	William H.K. Mooney & David Pitlik (Saving the Turtles); Laurie Isreal & Rachel Ruderman (Abuelito's Siesta)	Paul Bouchard, Mitch Manzer, Kerry Sargent, Genni Selby & Alex Szewczuk	August 1, 2009 (Note: "Saving the Turtles" was first released in Manny's Green Team DVD on March 31, 2009.)	217
Manny and the tools must build a bike trail, but they come across a nest of baby turtle eggs in the sand that are in the planned bike path. / Abuelito’s cuckoo clock is broken and the noise is keeping him from taking a siesta.
63	37	"Picture Perfect" / "Some Assembly Required"	Fred Stoller, Robert Cabeen	Paul Bouchard, Mitch Manzer, Genni Selby & Alex Szewczuk	August 8, 2009	236
Manny is Mr. Diller's 100th customer and gets to choose any item in the store as a prize. / The tools learn a valuable lesson about following instructions when they try to assemble a play structure at the community center.
64	38	"The Great Donate" / "Abuelito in a Fix"	Mike Rabb (The Great Donate); Doug Cordell (Abuelito in a Fix)	Paul Bouchard, Mitch Manzer, Genni Selby & Alex Szewczuk	September 18, 2009	235
Manny and the tools discover that the books in the children's reading room at the library are in bad shape and set up a donation for new books. / When Abuelito accidentally breaks the tortilla maker that Manny gave him for his birthday, he tries to fix it himself, which proves harder than he thinks.
65	39	"Fun and Games" / "Autumn Leaves"	Michael Stern (Fun and Games); Laurie Isreal & Rachel Ruderman (Autumn Leaves)	Paul Bouchard, Mitch Manzer, Genni Selby & Alex Szewczuk	October 17, 2009	238
Felipe learns that playing with his friends can be even more fun than playing with his new video game. / Manny and the tools make a compost bin for Mr. Ayala.
66	40	"Motorcycle Adventure"	Rick Gitelson	Jason Armstrong, Paul Bouchard, Genni Selby & Alex Szewczuk	October 4, 2009	240
Manny and his tools head off on a road trip to his family reunion on his motorcycle. But, things take a detour when Pat veers off on his own in search of his family members and winds up in the back of a truck headed for a big hardware store just outside of town. Now, Manny has to race to the rescue by catching up to the big truck and overcome a number of obstacles along the way in time to make it to the reunion.

=== Season 3 (2009–13) ===
All episodes are directed by Charles E. Bastien.

No. overall	No. in season	Title	Written by	Storyboard by	Original release date
67	1	"Pepe's Rocket" / "The Best Vacation Ever"	Sheila Dinsmore (Pepe's Rocket); Doug Cordell (The Best Vacation Ever)	Paul Bouchard, Mitch Manzer, Genni Selby & Alex Szewczuk	November 7, 2009
Pepe loses his brand new rocket in the woods, and it's up to Manny and the tools to find it. / Manny and the tools create a tropical paradise in Elliot's backyard after he twists his ankle and misses out on his island vacation.
68	2	"Mr. Lopart Sails Away" / "Pepe's Agua Fresca Stand"	Sheila Dinsmore (Mr. Lopart Sails Away); Laurie Israel & Rachel Ruderman (Pepe's Agua Fresca Stand)	Jason Armstrong, Paul Bouchard, Genni Selby & Alex Szewczuk	November 28, 2009
Manny and the tools join Mr. Lopart and Fluffy on a sailing expedition. / Manny’s nephew Pepe sets up a drink stall to sell his fruity drinks outside his house, but he doesn’t have any customers.
69	3	"A Whale of a Tale" / "Julieta's Loose Tooth"	Michael G. Stern (A Whale of a Tale); Holly Huckins (Julieta's Loose Tooth)	Jason Armstrong, Paul Bouchard, Genni Selby & Alex Szewczuk	December 7, 2009
Manny and the tools help to rescue a beached whale at the seashore. / When Julieta's loose tooth falls out and tumbles into the sink and down the drain, it's up to Manny and the tools to retrieve the lost tooth.
70	4	"Flicker Joins the Band" / "Paulette's Pizza Palace"	Robert Ramirez (Flicker Joins the Band); Peter Hunziker (Paulette's Pizza Palace)	Paul Bouchard, Mitch Manzer, Genni Selby & Alex Szewczuk	December 8, 2009
When the tools get together to play music, Flicker wants to join in on the musical fun. / When the pizza rolling machine at Paulette's Pizza Palace breaks, Manny and the tools must repair the machine so that Paulette is able to fulfill all the orders.
71	5	"Which Way to the Barbeque?" / "Back on Track"	Doug Cordell (Which Way to the Barbeque?); Arlene Sarner (Back on Track)	Jason Armstrong, Paul Bouchard, Genni Selby & Alex Szewczuk	December 9, 2009
When Kelly and Elliot propose a picnic barbecue, Manny suggests they have it at Lake Nochanailin. / Manny and the tools get Mrs. Portillo's sliding glass doors back on track, in order to help keep some pesky flies out of her kitchen while she makes salsa.
72	6	"Francisco Comes to Town" / "Broken Drawbridge"	Michael Rabb (Francisco Comes to Town); Chara Campanella (Broken Drawbridge)	Paul Bouchard, Mitch Manzer, Genni Selby & Alex Szewczuk	December 10, 2009
On his way to a horse show, Francisco experiences a flat tire on Estrella's trailer. / Manny must help the drawbridge operator when the bridge gets stuck.
73	7	"The Twisty Turn Twist" / "Mayor Rosa's Chimney"	Adam Rudman (The Twisty Turn Twist); Chara Campanella (Mayor Rosa's Chimney)	Jason Armstrong, Paul Bouchard, Genni Selby & Alex Szewczuk	February 13, 2010
While fixing a wooden rocking horse, the tools discuss what their dreams would be. / When Mayor Rosa's chimney starts to fall apart, Manny and the tools think of a creative and environmentally friendly way to fix it for her.
74	8	"Handy Manny: Big Race"	Michael Rabb	Jason Armstrong, Paul Bouchard, Genni Selby & Alex Szewczuk	March 20, 2010
Manny and the tools help Elliot fix a broken-down race car for the Wood Valley 500 race.
75	9	"The Earth Day Challenge" / "Dario Dance"	Jeff Wynne (The Earth Day Challenge); Michael Rabb (Dario Dance)	Jason Armstrong, Paul Bouchard, Genni Selby & Alex Szewczuk	April 17, 2010
Manny needs to find a project for the Sheet Rock Hills Earth Day Challenge. / Elliot teaches Mayor Rosa's nephew Dario how to dance in time for the Earth Day dance in the park.
76	10	"Seal Appeal" / "Pat Lightly"	Story by : Robert Ramirez; Teleplay by : Michael G. Stern (Seal Appeal); Kevin Monk (Pat Lightly)	Jason Armstrong, Paul Bouchard, Genni Selby & Alex Szewczuk	May 15, 2010
While out at sea on a whale watching tour, Manny and the tools must fix a broken signal buoy before a dense fog rolls in. / When the bird in Mrs. Portillo's backyard lays five eggs, she needs more space in her birdhouse for when they hatch.
77	11	"Bunny in the Basement" / "Fast Eddie's Scooter"	Laurie Israel & Rachel Ruderman (Bunny in the Basement); Kevin Monk (Fast Eddie's Scooter)	Paul Bouchard, Mitch Manzer, Genni Selby & Alex Szewczuk	July 10, 2010 (Note: Both episodes was first released in Big Race DVD on April 20, 2010.)
A bunny has been hopping through a broken vent into Mr. Singh's basement, so Manny and the tools fix the vent. / When Fast Eddie keeps crashing his scooter, Manny and the tools come up with a way for him to safely deliver his food.
78	12	"Chico Goes to Preschool" / "Kelly's Chili"	Amy Keating Rogers (Chico Goes to Preschool); Jorge Arguirre (Kelly's Chili)	Jason Armstrong, Paul Bouchard, Kerry Sargent, Genni Selby & Alex Szewczuk	August 28, 2010
Manny's nephew Chico is about to attend his first day of preschool, but Chico is nervous about going. / Manny and the tools help Kelly retrieve her grandmother's famous chili recipe from inside an antique desk.
79	13	"Story Hour" / "Long John Lopart"	Laurie Israel & Rachel Ruderman (Story Hour); Michael Rabb (Long John Lopart)	Jason Armstrong, Paul Bouchard, Genni Selby & Alex Szewczuk	September 15, 2010
While Manny and the tools are attending Story Hour at the library, a thunderstorm knocks out the power. / Not wanting to admit he's "handy-challenged," Mr. Lopart disguises himself as his pirate cousin, Long John Lopart.
80	14	"Handy Manny: Big Construction Job"	Story by : Rick Gitelson; Teleplay by : Michael Rabb	Jason Armstrong, Paul Bouchard, Genni Selby & Alex Szewczuk	October 11, 2010
Manny and the tools work on a big out-of-town construction job, where they meet Jack the jackhammer and Spinner the power drill. Back in town, Mr. Lopart tries to handle repairs, much to everyone's dismay.
81	15	"Leela's Birthday Party" / "Abuelito's Mower"	Laurie Israel & Rachel Ruderman (Leela's Birthday Party); Kevin Monk (Abuelito's Mower)	Jason Armstrong, Paul Bouchard, Kathy Paulin-Lougheed, Genni Selby & Alex Szewczuk	November 12, 2010
When Fluffy accidentally deflates the bouncy castle at Leela's birthday party, the tools help entertain the guests. / When Abuelito's old lawn mower breaks down, Manny and the tools find a way to replace the old parts and get the mower working again.
82	16	"Flicker Saves Christmas"	Michael Rabb	Jason Armstrong, Paul Bouchard, Kerry Sargent, Genni Selby & Alex Szewczuk	November 29, 2010
A fierce Christmas Eve storm forces Santa Claus to make an emergency landing in Sheet Rock Hills, and Manny and the tools team up with him in order to make all of his deliveries and save Christmas.
83	17	"The Ayala's Christmas Extravaganza" / "Mini Golf Game"	Holly Huckins (The Ayala's Christmas Extravaganza); Cynthia Riddle (Mini Golf Game)	Jason Armstrong, Paul Bouchard, Genni Selby & Alex Szewczuk	December 2, 2010
When the Ayalas' Christmas decorations cause a power outage, Manny and the tools fix the electricity. / Manny and the tools install a special light in lieu of a buzzer at the mini golf course to help their friend Miguel Salazar.
84	18	"Good Fences" / "Butterflies"	Guy Toubes (Good Fences); Kevin Monk (Butterflies)	Jason Armstrong, Paul Bouchard, Genni Selby & Alex Szewczuk	January 17, 2011 (Note: Both episodes was first released in Big Construction Job DVD on November 16, 2010.)
Renaldo wants to build a fence in order to keep his new dog from getting into his neighbor's yard. / Manny figures out a way to keep the butterflies inside the Sheet Rock Hills Butterfly Conservatory in time for its grand opening.
85	19	"Art Show" / "The New Time Capsule"	Chara Campanella (Art Show); Laurie Israel & Rachel Ruderman (The New Time Capsule)	Jason Armstrong, Paul Bouchard, Genni Selby & Alex Szewczuk	February 14, 2011
When Carmela can't get the art hung in time for the school art show, Manny and the tools come to the rescue. / Manny and the tools contribute to the Sheet Rock Hills time capsule by building a bigger box to hold everyone's offerings.
86	20	"Just One of the Puppies" / "Pet Picnic"	Mike Rabb (Just One of the Puppies); Laurie Israel & Rachel Ruderman (Pet Picnic)	Jason Armstrong, Paul Bouchard, Genni Selby & Alex Szewczuk	March 21, 2011
Renaldo's Pug has just had a litter of puppies and Manny and the tools have been called to build them a doghouse. / When the first ever Sheet Rock Hills Pet Picnic in the park gets rained out, Manny and the tools build an indoor stage and hold a Pet Talent Show instead.
87	21	"The Tools' New Team"	Jeff Wynne	Jason Armstrong, Paul Bouchard, Genni Selby & Alex Szewczuk	April 18, 2011
After Manny and the tools discover damage to their truck, they meet other talking tools and their retiring owner Hank, who help to fix it.
88	22	"To Catch a Litter Bug" / "Community Garden"	Michael Rabb (To Catch a Litter Bug); Chara Campanella (Community Garden)	Jason Armstrong, Paul Bouchard, Genni Selby & Alex Szewczuk	April 22, 2011
When the fountain at the park stops working, Manny and the tools discover that someone is dropping litter into it. / Manny and the tools help build a garden for Julieta and the other members of her community to enjoy.
89	23	"The Great Outdoors" / "The Cowboy Cookout"	Michael Rabb (The Great Outdoors); Marilyn Sadler (The Cowboy Cookout)	Jason Armstrong, Paul Bouchard, Genni Selby & Alex Szewczuk	May 23, 2011
Manny and the tools see that Quinn hasn't gone outside all day because he's glued to the TV. / Manny and the tools help Francisco build a new barbecue grill for the Cowboy Cookout.
90	24	"Beach Clean Up" / "Root Damage"	Cynthia Riddle (Beach Clean Up); Unknown (Root Damage)	Jason Armstrong, Paul Bouchard, Genni Selby & Alex Szewczuk	July 8, 2011
Manny and the tools go to the shore for Beach Clean Up Day. / A large tree root has cracked the sidewalk, so Manny and the tools must figure out how to fix the pavement without hurting the tree.
91	25	"Breakfast of Champions" / "Bowling Night"	Adam Rudman (Breakfast of Champions); Cynthia Riddle (Bowling Night)	Tim O'Halloran, Kris Pern & Kerry Sargent	August 5, 2011
Manny cooks a healthy and delicious breakfast for the tools. But Felipe is too excited to eat, and when he runs out of energy, the other tools worry about him. / Manny and the tools are called upon to fix the pinsetter at the local bowling alley before the Bowling League arrives.
92	26	"Doggie Door" / "Rocking Chair"	Amy Keating Rogers (Doggie Door); Kevin Monk (Rocking Chair)	Jason Armstrong, Paul Bouchard, Genni Selby & Alex Szewczuk	September 10, 2011
Manny and the tools realize that Mrs. Portillo's dog, Carlos, needs a doggie door. / Mr. Alvarez calls Manny and the tools, saying a chair from his childhood days has broken. Manny gets an idea of turning the chair into a rocking chair.
93	27	"Table for Too Many" / "Bunk Bed"	Guy Toubes (Table for Too Many); Kevin Monk (Bunk Bed)	Jason Armstrong, Paul Bouchard, Kerry Sargent, Genni Selby & Alex Szewczuk	September 11, 2011
Dwayne Bouffant plans a dinner party at his home, and asks Manny to build a special table for the occasion. / Manny and the tools build a bunk bed for Kevin and Nelson.
94	28	"A Job from Outer Space" / "Sounds Like Halloween"	Story by : Charles E. Bastien; Teleplay by : Rick Gitelson (A Job from Outer Space); Michael Rabb (Sounds Like Halloween)	Jason Armstrong, Paul Bouchard, Genni Selby & Alex Szewczuk	September 16, 2011
Manny and the tools help an alien named Enam repair his damaged spacecraft so he can return to his family. / Manny and the tools help Mrs. Lee build a spooky haunted house for her Halloween display.
95	29	"Fixit's Repair" / "Pottery Class"	Michael Rabb (Fixit's Repair); Jorge Aguirre (Pottery Class)	Jason Armstrong, Paul Bouchard, Genni Selby & Alex Szewczuk	September 22, 2011
When Fix-It wanders out into the rain and short circuits, it's up to the tools to do whatever they can to fix her. / Manny and the tools repair Carmela's broken pottery kiln.
96	30	"Flicker the Kicker" / "The Sheet Rock Hills Strikers"	Jorge Aguirre (Flicker the Kicker); Chara Campanella (The Sheet Rock Hills Strikers)	Jason Armstrong, Paul Bouchard, Genni Selby & Alex Szewczuk	September 25, 2011
Mr. Ayala needs help getting the goal up in time for his son's soccer team's first practice. / After leading the Sheet Rock Hills Strikers to a bowling tournament victory, Manny and the tools build a bowling alley trophy case to display the award.
97	31	"The Great Garage Rescue"	Michael Rabb	David Baggley & Charles E. Bastien (Part 1); Steve Remen & Alex Szewczuk (Part 2)	October 3, 2011
Manny and the tools travel back to Concrete Falls to try to help his brother save their family's auto-repair facility from being torn down.
98	32	"The Chicken or the Egg" / "Picture This"	Michael G. Stern (The Chicken or the Egg); Michael Rabb (Picture This)	Jason Armstrong, Paul Bouchard, Genni Selby & Alex Szewczuk	November 4, 2011
Manny and the tools accidentally scare a mother hen when they repair the roof of a henhouse. / The tools try to snap a picture of a mysterious creature to enter into a photo contest.
99	33	"The Wing and Nut Challenge" / "Dusty's Big Day"	Sheila Dinsmore (The Wing and Nut Challenge); Kevin Monk (Dusty's Big Day)	Paul Bouchard & Genni Selby	November 11, 2011
Manny and the tools can't wait to help set up the stage for Wing and Nut's live game show in the park. / Dusty helps Mrs. Thompson saw wooden blocks for her preschool class.
100	34	"Manny's Wilderness Adventure"	Jorge Aguirre	Steve Remen & Alex Szewczuk	November 18, 2011
Manny and the tools go on a camping trip and take a wild ride on a runaway river raft.
101	35	"Fearless Rusty" / "Dog Fountain"	Fred Stoller (Fearless Rusty); Sharon Soboil (Dog Fountain)	Genni Selby & Alex Szewczuk	November 25, 2011
Magic Marty waves his wand and casts a magic spell over Rusty to help him feel braver. / Manny and the tools fix the fountain at the top of the Sheet Rock Hills Trail and add a new water bowl for dogs.
102	36	"Snow Problem"	Scott Gray	Genni Selby & Alex Szewczuk	December 16, 2011
Manny and the tools go on a winter ski vacation up in the mountains, but Manny and the tools are separated from each other when they try to repair a broken ski lift.
103	37	"Snow Day" / "Susanna's Dollhouse"	Jorge Aguirre (Snow Day); Laurie Israel & Rachel Ruderman (Susanna's Dollhouse)	Jason Armstrong, Paul Bouchard, Genni Selby & Alex Szewczuk	December 30, 2011
Manny and the tools help Kelly out of her driveway and get to her store during a snowstorm. / Manny and the tools work together to rebuild Mrs. Alvarez's old dollhouse so she can give it to her daughter, Susanna, as a gift.
104	38	"St. Patrick's Day"	Cynthia Riddle	Genni Selby & Alex Szewczuk	March 16, 2012
The citizens of Sheet Rock Hills go on a St. Patrick's Day scavenger hunt to search for St. Patrick's Day-related items.
105	39	"Handy Manny and the 7 Tools"	Michael G. Stern	Charles E. Bastien & Derek Prout (Part 1); Genni Selby & Alex Szewczuk (Part 2)	April 13, 2012
Manny and the tools help fix up an old theater for Kelly's Aunt Ginny.
106	40	"Wedding Day"	Peter Hunziker	Genni Selby & Alex Szewczuk	April 27, 2012
Manny and the tools help with wedding preparations for his Abuelito's marriage to Mrs. Portillo and Rusty is entrusted with holding onto the wedding ring.
107	41	"Firefighter Manny"	Scott Gray	Charles E. Bastien & James Caswell (Part 1); Genni Selby & Alex Szewczuk (Part 2)	September 7, 2012
Manny, Kelly and the tools get training to be firefighters as they learn how to rescue people and put out fires.
108	42	"Hank's Birthday"	Jeff Wynne	James Caswell & Alex Szewczuk	October 9, 2012
Manny and the tools visit Hank in Florida to celebrate his birthday.
109	43	"Kelly's Big Photo Shoot" / "Phone Fix"	Laurie Israel & Rachel Ruderman (Kelly's Big Photo Shoot); Kevin Monk (Phone Fix)	Genni Selby & Alex Szewczuk	October 10, 2012
The tools go on a competition for a chance to appear in an advertisement for Kelly's hardware store. / After receiving a garbled phone call during a strong rainstorm, Manny and his tools travel throughout town to find clues about who called for help.
110	44	"The Right Stuff" / "Vet Visit"	Laurie Israel & Rachel Ruderman (The Right Stuff); Kevin Monk (Vet Visit)	Genni Selby & Alex Szewczuk	October 11, 2012
Manny and the tools help Abuelito redecorate his house. / Manny and the tools build a play area for animals waiting to see the vet.
111	45	"Mrs. Lopart's Attic" / "Hoop Dream"	Sheila Dinsmore (Mrs. Lopart's Attic); Lorne Cameron (Hoop Dream)	James Caswell & Genni Selby	October 12, 2012
Manny and the tools go trick-or-treating and help Mrs. Lopart scare a stubborn bat out of her attic. / Manny and the tools try to cheer up Pepe by making a basketball hoop near his house.
112	46	"Valentine's Day Party"	Peter Hunziker	Genni Selby & Alex Szewczuk	February 14, 2013
Manny wants to invite Kelly to Mrs. Portillo's Valentine's Day party and finally works up the courage with a little help from the tools.

== Handy Manny's School for Tools ==
No.	Title	Original release date
1	"Bolt of Us"	January 25, 2010
2	"Squaring Off"	March 1, 2010
3	"Measure Me"	March 8, 2010
4	"A Place for Everything"	March 15, 2010
5	"Let There Be Light"	March 22, 2010
6	"Sneezes Cleans Up"	April 6, 2010
7	"Hammer Time"	April 13, 2010
8	"Twist and Turn"	April 20, 2010
9	"The Right Wrench"	April 27, 2010
10	"Safety Rules"	October 14, 2010
11	"A Whole Lot of Holes"	November 21, 2010
12	"A Small Job"	February 14, 2011
13	"Oil and Water"	February 21, 2011
14	"Neat and Tidy"	February 28, 2011
15	"Tool Teamwork"	March 5, 2011
16	"A Nail for Every Job"	September 25, 2011
17	"Pipe Wrench"	October 9, 2011
18	"Bend, Pull and Twist"	November 28, 2011
19	"Too Tight to Turn"	May 24, 2012
