= Animal Crackers (TV series) =

- Genre: Comedy
- Based on: Animal Crackers by Roger Bollen
- Developed by: Joseph Mallozzi
- Directed by: Louis Piché (seasons 1-2); Nadja Cozic (season 3)
- Voices of: Mark Camacho; Teddy Lee Dillon; Kate Hutchison; Marc Montgomery; Terrence Scammell; Dawn Ford
- Composers: Jeff Fisher; Steve Wener
- Countries of origin: Canada; France
- Original language: English
- No. of seasons: 3
- No. of episodes: 39 (78 segments)

Production
- Executive producers: Micheline Charest; Ronald A. Weinberg; Christian Davin
- Producer: Cassandra Schafhausen
- Running time: 23 minutes
- Production companies: CINAR; Alphanim

Original release
- Network: Teletoon (Canada); La Cinquième/Canal J (France)
- Release: October 17, 1997 – September 16, 2000

Animal Crackers is an animated television series produced by CINAR and Alphanim in association with Canal J. It is based on the newspaper comic strip Animal Crackers by the American cartoonist Roger Bollen. The show was first launched in Canada on Teletoon on October 17, 1997, when the network began to broadcast; before premiering on La Cinquième and Canal J on September 19, 1999, in France. It ended with the final episode on September 16, 2000, in Canada. It lasted for three seasons with 39 episodes.

== Plot ==
The show tells about a group of anthropomorphic animals that live in a fictional jungle in Africa called Freeborn.

== Characters ==
=== Major characters ===
- Lyle Lion (voiced by Mark Camacho): Passive, insecure and a mama's boy, Lyle is not what one might call "King of the Jungle" (he's more of a prince who is incapable of being king), intent on taking philosophy classes and ordering pizzas (preferably vegetarian) than to be the dominant predator. Despite multiple failed attempts, his number one goal in life is to date Lana. Outside his love life, his other goal is to be an astronomer.
- Dodo (voiced by Teddy Lee Dillon): He is the last remaining dodo alive and is Lyle's best friend. Rash, impatient and slightly self-centered, he is extremely hot-headed and refuses to believe that he lacks the ability to fly. This leads to multiple failed attempts to take flight, sometimes using some very innovative and unusual techniques, all of which fail.
- Eugene the Elephant (voiced by Terrence Scammell): Eugene is a bull elephant who acts as an "overgrown baby" that craves attention, despite his size and nature. He is rather arrogant, obnoxious and is unafraid to bully others with his size and strength to get what he wants. Some of his secret pleasures include inhaling loads of peanut butter and stomping petunias, but the sight of a tiny mouse will freak him out.
- Gnu the Wildebeest (voiced by Marc Montgomery): For a "supposed" leader of a herd, he lacks any leadership qualities; rather, his traits show the exact opposite of a leader: lazy, timid and no sense of direction. Despite his nature, Gnu does mean well and is very dedicated to his herd, even though his presence there will hinder rather than help. A single father with a son he loves very much, he is a caring parent.
- Lana the Lioness (voiced by Kate Hutchinson): Lana is smart, attractive, strong-minded and the object of Lyle's affection. Lana is quite caring towards her fellow inhabitants of Freeborn and will put the group ahead of herself. She is an avid book lover and is often found with her nose in a novel. Despite showing little to no interest in Lyle's pursuits, it has been hinted that perhaps she does reciprocate his crush on her.

=== Supporting characters ===
- Tito: a silent chameleon with no dialogue in the entire series. Often Tito can be found among the main characters, but due to his size and silent nature, he's usually either knocked aside, stepped or sat on, or used for some purpose, the characters mistaking him for an inanimate object. Despite this, Tito rarely holds any ill-will or contempt for the others and often shows to be very intelligent or at least at times on the same level as Lana, able to solve a problem or fix something when most of the other characters can't figure it out.
- Lance: Another lion who competes with Lyle for Lana's attention.
- Louie: Lyle's nephew. Being a cub still in diapers, Louie speaks in a manner similar to Mikey from Look Who's Talking where the audience can hear his thoughts, but the characters within the show are unaware what he's thinking. Unlike most animals on the Preserve, Louie doesn't think less of Lyle for his shortcomings, though he does show more self-awareness and intelligence than his uncle.
- Bud and Edna: Two recurring human tourists, both the common stereotype of the annoying tourist couple who bumble about, usually completely unaware of what's really going on around them and making things more uncomfortable for the locals.
- Junior and the Herd: Junior is Gnu's son (though never properly named in the series beyond "Junior", so it is possible he shares his father's name) he is shown to be smarter and have more common sense than his father and is sometimes embarrassed by him, but understands Gnu's desire to be a leader and a good father and loves and respects him for this. The herd meanwhile don't show as much respect but are rather fittingly about as lazy as Gnu, often bailing on him whenever he calls for a stampede. Ironically, it is their lazy tendencies that keep Gnu as leader as any other leader (such as Roland the Waterbuffalo) would forcibly work them hard and into shape, which they don't want. Some of the herd have more distinct personalities, such as the gnu with a backwards baseball cap who speaks like a Californian surfer stereotype, an especially geeky gnu with an ID tag on his ear (these two can often be seen together), and a smaller gnu about Junior's age who appears to be the geeky gnu's little brother as they share similar characteristics, such as glasses and buck teeth.
- Elmo the Crocodile: A somewhat passive and laid-back crocodile who usually just floats in the pond. He tends to be the butt of physical pain humor every now and then, as someone ends up landing on his head when jumping into the pond. Although he's as docile as any of the other animals in the preserve, he will on the rare occasion indulge his predatory instincts by trying (and failing) to convince smaller animals to allow him to eat them.
- Roland the African buffalo
- Lamont the Hippopotamus
- Roxanne the Ostrich (voiced by Dawn Ford)
- Grandpa Tortoise and his grandsons
- Sergeant Rhino
- Snake
- Frog and Toad

== Episodes ==
=== Season 1 (1997) ===
No. overall	No. in season	Title	Directed by	Written by	Storyboard by	Original release date
1	1	"High Gnu'n" "Eu-genial"	Louis Piché Greg Bailey (supervising director)	Joseph Mallozzi	Julian Harris (Segment 1) Gerry Capelle (Segment 2)	12 September 1999 (La Cinquième); 17 October 1997 (Teletoon)
2	2	"Dino-Sore-As Heck" "Wilderness Training 101"	Louis Piché Greg Bailey (supervising director)	Michael Leo Donovan (Segment 1) Joseph Mallozzi (Segment 2)	Robert Yap (Segment 1) Denis Banville (Segment 2)	18 October 1997 (Teletoon)
3	3	"Treasure of the Preserva Freeborna" "Call Waiting"	Louis Piché Greg Bailey (supervising director)	Joseph Mallozzi (Segment 1) Michael Leo Donovan (Segment 2)	Julian Harris (Segment 1) Gerry Capelle (Segment 2)	19 October 1997 (Teletoon)
4	4	"For Goodness Snakes" "Meat the Folks"	Louis Piché Greg Bailey (supervising director)	Thomas LaPierre (Segment 1) Ian Boothby (Segment 2)	Denis Banville (Segment 1) Rob Walton (Segment 2)	20 October 1997 (Teletoon)
5	5	"If You Can't Be'em, Join'em" "Spring Fever"	Louis Piché Greg Bailey (supervising director)	Paul Mullie (Segment 1) Michael Leo Donovan (Segment 2)	Julian Harris (Segment 1) Gerry Capelle (Segment 2)	21 October 1997 (Teletoon)
6	6	"Pachyderm Pandemonium" "Herd Mentality"	Louis Piché Greg Bailey (supervising director)	C. Northey; Michael Palmeter (Segment 1) Anne-Marie Perrotta and Tean Schultz (Segment 2)	Rob Walton (Segment 1) Gerry Capelle (Segment 2)	22 October 1997 (Teletoon)
7	7	"Going Quakers" "Blockbusted"	Louis Piché Greg Bailey (supervising director)	Rick Jones; John Handforth (Segment 1) Patrick Granleese and Hugh Neilson (Segment 2)	Éric Bergeron (Segment 1) Julian Harris (Segment 2)	23 October 1997 (Teletoon)
8	8	"Pachyn My Bags" "Mommy Dearest"	Louis Piché Greg Bailey (supervising director)	Ken Ross (Segment 1) Kim Segal (Segment 2)	Mark Dubeau (Segment 1) Rob Walton (Segment 2)	24 October 1997 (Teletoon)
9	9	"Sherlock Dodo" "Poultrygeist"	Louis Piché	Barry Julien (Segment 1) Joseph Mallozzi (Segment 2)	Éric Bergeron (Segment 1) Gerry Capelle (Segment 2)	25 October 1997 (Teletoon)
10	10	"Lyle's Psychic Alliance" "Snowed Inn"	Louis Piché	Paul Mullie (Segment 1) Michael Leo Donovan (Segment 2)	Gerry Capelle (Segment 1) Julian Harris (Segment 2)	26 October 1997 (Teletoon)
11	11	"Svelte Veldt" "All the Preserve's a Stage"	Louis Piché	Brian C. Fuld (Segment 1) Anthony Guadagno (Segment 2)	Éric Bergeron (Segment 1) Mark Dubeau (Segment 2)	27 October 1997 (Teletoon)
12	12	"It's a Date" "Bully for Woolly"	Louis Piché	Anne-Marie Perrotta; Tean Schultz (Segment 1) Wayne Millett (Segment 2)	Gerry Capelle (Segment 1) Julian Harris (Segment 2)	28 October 1997 (Teletoon)
13	13	"Lights! Camera! Lyle!" "Bud and Edna's Excellent Adventure!"	Louis Piché	Joseph Mallozzi; B.M. Stoller (Segment 1) Joseph Mallozzi (Segment 2)	Gerry Capelle (Segment 1) Éric Bergeron (Segment 2)	29 October 1997 (Teletoon)

=== Season 2 (1998) ===
No. overall	No. in season	Title	Directed by	Written by	Storyboard by	Original release date
14	1	"Sleepover" "Classified Casanova"	Louis Piché	Michael Leo Donovan (Segment 1) Patrick Granleese; Hugh Nielson (Segment 2)	Julian Harris (Segment 1) Éric Bergeron (Segment 2)	5 February 1998 (Teletoon)
15	2	"Eight Hooves Out" "My Brother's Keeper"	Louis Piché	Barry Julian (Segment 1) Jacques Bouchard (Segment 2)	Gerry Capelle (Segment 1) Éric Bergeron (Segment 2)	6 February 1998 (Teletoon)
16	3	"Lyle's Ark" "How to Be a Millionaire"	Louis Piché	Rowby Goren (Segment 1) Anne-Marie Perrotta; Tean Schultz (Segment 2)	Julian Harris (Segment 1) Gerry Capelle (Segment 2)	7 February 1998 (Teletoon)
17	4	"Lyle Files" "The Butler Did It"	Louis Piché	Todd Swift; Thor Bishopric (Segment 1) Ken Ross (Segment 2)	Jean Sarô (Segment 1) Éric Bergeron (Segment 2)	8 February 1998 (Teletoon)
18	5	"Lyle in the Fast Lane" "A Wing and a Prayer"	Louis Piché	Barry Julien (Segment 1) Rick Jones (Segment 2)	Gerry Capelle (Segment 1) Julian Harris (Segment 2)	9 February 1998 (Teletoon)
19	6	"Schooldaze" "Call of the Wild"	Louis Piché	Michael Leo Donovan (Segment 1) Thomas LaPierre; Joseph Mallozzi (segment 2)	Éric Bergeron (Segment 1) Gerry Capelle (Segment 2)	9 February 1998 (Teletoon)
20	7	"The Cold Shoulder" "The Last Dodo Egg"	Louis Piché	Hugh Nielson; Maureen Welch (Segment 1) Michael Leo Dovonan; Vigeland Rubin (Segment 2)	Julian Harris (Segment 1) Éric Bergeron (Segment 2)	10 February 1998 (Teletoon)
21	8	"Lana Turner Overdrive" "Trust Me"	Louis Piché	Jennifer Kierans (Segment 1) Kim Segal (Segment 2)	Éric Bergeron (Segment 1) Gerry Capelle (Segment 2)	11 February 1998 (Teletoon)
22	9	"Birthday Palooza" "Tito in Love"	Louis Piché	Joseph Mallozzi (Segment 1) Michael Leo Dovonan (Segment 2)	Kervin Faria (Segment 1) Gerry Capelle (Segment 2)	12 February 1998 (Teletoon)
23	10	"Downsizing" "Gnus in Canoes"	Louis Piché	Anne-Marie Perrotta; Tean Schultz (Segment 1) Michael Leo Dovonan; Bryan Michael Stoller (Segment 2)	Éric Bergeron (Segment 1) Jean Sarô (Segment 2)	13 February 1998 (Teletoon)
24	11	"Beauty and Eugene" "Freeborn for Hire"	Louis Piché	Michael Leo Dovonan; Lynn Mason (Segment 1) Wayne Millett (Segment 2)	Gerry Capelle (Segment 1) Jean Sarô (Segment 2)	14 February 1998 (Teletoon)
25	12	"Horrorscope" "Lights! Camera! Gnu!"	Louis Piché	Michael Leo Dovonan (Segment 1) Joseph Mallozzi (Segment 2)	Éric Bergeron (Segment 1) Gerry Capelle (Segment 2)	15 February 1998 (Teletoon)
26	13	"Loony Bin" "That's What Friends Are For"	Louis Piché	Jacques Bouchard (Segment 1) Anne-Marie Perrotta (Segment 2)	Éric Bergeron (Segment 1) Gerry Capelle (Segment 2)	16 February 1998 (Teletoon)

=== Season 3 (2000) ===
No. overall	No. in season	Title	Directed by	Written by	Storyboard by	Original release date
27	1	"Look Who's Not Talking" "Paris, Freeborn"	Nadja Cozic; Pascal Pinon (co-director)	Michael Leo Dovonan (Segment 1) Ken Ross (Segment 2)	Jean LaJeunesse (Segment 1) François Brisson (Segment 2)	28 August 2000 (Teletoon)
28	2	"Eugenius" "Citizen Eugene"	Nadja Cozic; Pascal Pinon (co-director)	Anne-Marie Perrotta; Tean Schultz (Segment 1) Patrick Granleese (Segment 2)	Denis Ternisien (Segment 1) Catherine Griffaton (Segment 2)	28 August 2000 (Teletoon)
29	3	"Dial-a-Phobia" "Time Flies But Dodo Doesn't"	Nadja Cozic; Pascal Pinon (co-director)	Michael Leo Dovonan (Segment 1) David Acer (Segment 2)	Michelle Perez; Azad Injejikian (Segment 1) Alex Hawley (Segment 2)	29 August 2000 (Teletoon)
30	4	"A Rumor of Her Own" "Prime Time Crime"	Nadja Cozic; Pascal Pinon (co-director)	John Handforth (Segment 1) Gerard Lewis (Segment 2)	Catherine Griffaton (Segment 1) Denis Ternisien (Segment 2)	29 August 2000 (Teletoon)
31	5	"Dustbusters" "Freeborn Online"	Nadja Cozic; Pascal Pinon (co-director)	Michael Leo Dovonan (Segment 1) Jacques Daviault; Wayne Millett (Segment 2)	Michelle Perez; Azad Injejikian (Segment 1) Alex Hawley (Segment 2)	30 August 2000 (Teletoon)
32	6	"Stop in the Name of Lana" "Starstruck"	Nadja Cozic; Pascal Pinon (co-director)	Maureen; Hugh Neilson (Segment 1) Jacques Bouchard (Segment 2)	Catherine Griffaton (Segment 1) Denis Ternisien (Segment 2)	30 August 2000 (Teletoon)
33	7	"Volcano Madness" "Love Is Blind"	Nadja Cozic; Pascal Pinon (co-director)	Anne-Marie Perrotta; Tean Schultz (Segment 1) Natalie Dumoulin (Segment 2)	Michelle Perez; Azad Injejikian (Segment 1) Alex Hawley (Segment 2)	31 August 2000 (Teletoon)
34	8	"Wishing Well" "Eu've Got Mail"	Nadja Cozic; Pascal Pinon (co-director)	Michael Leo Donovan (Segment 1) Heidi Foss (Segment 2)	Denis Ternisien (Segment 1) Régis Parenteau (Segment 2)	31 August 2000 (Teletoon)
35	9	"Message in a Bottle" "Fame, Fortune, Madness"	Nadja Cozic; Pascal Pinon (co-director)	Michael Leo Donovan (Segment 1) Michael F. Hamill (Segment 2)	Michelle Perez; Azad Injejikian (Segment 1) Alex Hawley (Segment 2)	1 September 2000 (Teletoon)
36	10	"Storyteller" "Animal Court"	Nadja Cozic; Pascal Pinon (co-director)	Michael Leo Donovan (Segment 1) Brian Cameron Fuld (Segment 2)	Denis Ternisien (Segment 1) Régis Parenteau (Segment 2)	1 September 2000 (Teletoon)
37	11	"Boo" "Fountain of Youth"	Nadja Cozic; Pascal Pinon (co-director)	Michael Leo Donovan (Segment 1) David Acer (Segment 2)	Michelle Perez; Éric Bergeron (Segment 1) Alex Hawley (Segment 2)	14 September 2000 (Teletoon)
38	12	"Brand New Gnu" "Boyz Night Out"	Nadja Cozic; Pascal Pinon (co-director)	Michael Palmeter (Segment 1) Natalie Dumoulin (Segment 2)	Denis Ternisien (Segment 1) Régis Parenteau (Segment 2)	15 September 2000 (Teletoon)
39	13	"Fool's Gold" "Near Myths"	Nadja Cozic; Pascal Pinon (co-director)	Michael Leo Donovan	Michelle Perez; Azad Injejikian (Segment 1) Alex Hawley (Segment 2)	16 September 2000 (Teletoon)

== Telecast and home media ==
The show was first aired in Canada on Teletoon during its launch in 1997, but added in the U.S. on Fox Family (now Freeform) in 1998 until 2000 and the Cookie Jar Toons block on This TV from November 2008 until August 2009. In foreign countries, the show was also aired in France beginning on La Cinquième (now France 5) and Canal J on September 19, 1999, and Gulli on November 26, 2005, while in Malaysia on TV9 and Astro Ceria. As of 2022, the show is now streaming on Tubi.

== Crew ==
- Micheline Charest – executive producer
- Ronald A. Weinberg – executive producer
- Christian Davin – co-executive producer
- Cassandra Schafhausen – producer
- Nadja Cozic – director (seasons 2–3)
- Louis Piché – director (season 1)
- Pascal Pinon – director/co-director
- Katell Lardeux – line producer
- Justine Hyun Van Phong – line producer
- Lesley Taylor – line producer
- Natalie Dumoulin – associate producer
- Jan Van Rijsselberge – animation supervisor
- Robert Waldren – animation supervisor
- Heidi Blomkvist – timing director
- Sebastian Grunsta – timing director
- Alan Jeffery – timing director
- Jean Pilotte – timing director
- Greg Bailey – supervising director
- Andrew Gryn – talent coordinator
- Éric Thériault – background design
- Wayne Millett – background design supervisor
- Éric Bergeron – storyboard director
- Gerry Capelle – storyboard director
- Julian Harris – storyboard director
- Jean Sarô – storyboard director

=== Writing credits ===
- Joseph Mallozzi – writer
- Ian Boothby – writer
- Wayne Millett – writer
- Jennifer Kierans – writer
- Pierre Colin-Tiebert – writer
- Thomas LaPierre – writer
- Jacques Bouchard – writer
- Jacques Daviault – writer
- Patrick Granleese – writer
- Hugh Neilson – writer
- Maureen Neilson – writer
- C. Northey – writer
- Michael Palmeter – writer
- Gerard Lewis – writer
- John Handforth – writer
- Ken Ross – writer
- Amy Jo Cooper – writer
- Greg Van Riel – writer
- Kim Segal – writer
- Rick Jones – writer
- Natalie Dumoulin – writer
- Heidi Foss – writer
- Lynn Mason – writer
- Brian Cameron Fuld – writer
- Rowby Goren – writer
- David Acer – writer
- Michael Leo Donovan – writer
- Bryan Michael Stoller – writer
- Anne-Marie Perrotta – writer
- Daniel Baldassi – writer
- Michael F. Hamill – writer
- Barry Julian – writer
- Tean Schultz – writer
- Thor Bishopric – writer
- Todd Swift – writer
- Vigeland Rubin – writer
