= It's Not Easy Being a Bunny =

1983 children's book by Marilyn Sadler

- Front cover, designed by Roger Bollen
- Author: Marilyn Sadler
- Cover artist: Roger Bollen
- Language: English
- Series: Beginner Books
- Genre: Children's literature
- Publisher: Random House
- Publication date: 1983
- Publication place: United States
- Media type: Print (hardcover and paperback)
- Pages: 39
- ISBN: 978-0-679-85410-4
- OCLC: 56505637

It's Not Easy Being a Bunny is a children's book written by Marilyn Sadler and illustrated by Roger Bollen, first published in 1983. In 2024, it was the No. 1 bestseller on Publishers Weekly's Easter children's picture book list.

== Plot ==
The book is about a young bunny named P.J. Funnybunny and his adventures as he goes to live with various different animals because he does not like being a bunny. The story ends with him being a bunny again when he comes back to the other bunnies and he likes them all again.

== Reception ==
A 2010 article in The Los Angeles Times described the book as "bereft of plot but long on character development and big, goofy illustrations".
