= David Graham (casting director) =

American casting director

David Graham (January 6, 1924 – November 3, 2015) was an American casting director. Graham was in the United States Army Air Force, after which he received his first role on an acting job in a summer stock production of The Male Animal.

He first appeared on Broadway in a play produced by the renowned David Merrick titled Bright Boy. He spent the next two years as editor of the weekly Theatrical Calendar.

He edited a publication of Ross Reports on television for two years and produced the Carlo Goldoni play La Locandiera (The Mistress of the Inn) for Equity Library Theatre.
