= Animal Cracker Conspiracy Puppet Company =

Animal Cracker Conspiracy Puppet Company, or Animal Cracker Conspiracy (ACC), is a contemporary hybrid puppet company co-founded by Iain Gunn and Bridget Rountree that is invested in pushing the boundaries of kinetic performance, creating performances that "decenter expectations, open new avenues of thought, and invoke the uncanny." Their ongoing practice is based on a shared interest and exploration of where fine art, puppetry, performance art, circus, dance, film, and mixed media intersect. They perform nationally and internationally out of a multiplicity of venues such as La Jolla Playhouse in San Diego, California, where the company resides. ACC specializes in inclusive multimedia performances that encourage difficult discussions and foster community through local theater, Street Parades, and national tours.

Gunn and Rountree have served as directors, designers, developers, producers, and puppeteers in the company's productions since its founding.

== History ==
=== Early life ===
In 1993, Iain Gunn received a Bachelor of Fine Arts from the University of British Columbia. Bridget Rountree received a B.A. in Literature studying domestically at UC Berkeley and UC Santa Barbara in 2005 as well as one in Fine Arts internationally at La Scuola Lorenzo de' Medici in Florence, Italy. They joined forces in 2004 after they met at the San Diego Children's Museum where Gunn was an artist in residence while working with Fern Street Circus, a community circus for underserved youth. They collaborated in San Diego's underground performance scene with Technomania Circus, which gave rise to the creation of their own collective circus, Zirk Ubu, as well as Animal Cracker Conspiracy.

=== 2006–present: Professional Experience ===
2006–Present: Animal Cracker Conspiracy; Co-founder, Director, Puppeteer, Designer
2005–2006: San Diego Art Department; Art Instructor teaching foundation painting, drawing, sculpture
2005–2011: San Diego Guild of Puppetry; Puppetry Instructor, Puppeteer
2007–2011: Zirk Ubu; Co-founder, Director, Puppeteer Designer, Performer
2007–2013: Dragon Knights; Stilt walker, Character Actor, CA
2013: Bedlam Theater, Workshop using puppetry and storytelling
MiraCosta College Actors Academy, Puppetry Workshop, co-Teacher, Guest Lecturer
2014: Eurydice, Theater Class USD, Puppetry Manipulation, Shadow Intensive, Guest Lecturer
Puppetry Development Intensive USD; Co-Teacher, Movement, director
2015: When It Comes, Old Globe, Puppet Development, Manipulation, designer

== Work ==
Animal Cracker Conspiracy produces puppet shows, cabarets, and multidisciplinary exhibitions, many of which they have toured and performed for local, national, and international audiences.

=== Society of Wonder ===
Commissioned by La Jolla Playhouse Without Walls (WOW) in 2020, Society of Wonder is a series of six short live action puppet films. The story is set in a not-too-distant world in impending collapse, partly due to the global disappearance of chickens and partly due to a monopolistic technocracy which has innocuously taken over the world. The protagonists, five seemingly unrelated characters, receive mysterious signs and some coercion from a mysterious 6th character (the Cyborg) that eventually leads them all to one another and to the unearthing of magic. The use of puppets in Society of Wonder supports both the concept and content of the production. They serve as a bridge between the human and the spirit realm, which are invoked throughout the story in the search for magic, knowledge and the responsibility of humans to reconnect both to nature and culture.

=== Paper Cities ===
Paper Cities, or Strategies to Avert the Coming Megalopolis is an ongoing experiment in devised puppet performance. They use puppets, animated objects, dance/anti-dance(movement), original film and live music as routes to create and question meaning in an increasingly uncertain time environmentally, socially, politically and spiritually. The inquiry: what epistemologies have led to this precariousness? How have textual information and images, sense and law, architecture and habit, played a part? Drawing from Gunn and Rountree's personal histories as art makers, lovers, and great-granddaughters and great-grandsons of colonial settlers, they implicate themselves with the 'other.' They interrogate historical narratives, settler/expansionist movements that have led to an epistemology of 'progress' that occludes the realities of war, genocide, imperialism, and environmental degradation.

=== The Collector ===
Performed with toy and object theatre, table-top puppets, stop motion animation, and film, The Collector is a mysterious tale set in an alternate reality. The story follows a lowly debt collector who, under the management of a mechanical, tyrannical overseer, undergoes a radical transformation of spirit in the process of collecting outstanding debts. As he travels through an urban landscape, the boundaries between object and self collide, and a multidimensional, mixed media performance through Orwellian, Neo-Victorian lenses unfolds.

=== Gnomesense ===
Gnomesense! A Happening in the Garden! is a parade performed with giant puppets, stilt walkers, dancers, and musicians, offering dreamlike, meta-impromptu dance parties and singalongs for audiences to engage with and enjoy. Led by a group of benevolent, "mystical garden beings", Gnomesense serves to invoke "spirits of nonsense, serious play, and make believe to come out and bask in the sunshine," drawing inspiration from carnival processions across the globe, including giant puppetry used in Indonesian, Italian, and Japanese cultures.

=== Adult Puppet Cabaret ===
The Cabaret is a curated show produced twice a year featuring short form puppet theater, designed for a mature audience. Created out of a desire to foster new works of puppetry, Animal Cracker Conspiracy presents a diverse group of puppet artists, partially supported by the Puppet Slam Network spearheaded by Heather Henson and IBEX Puppetry.

=== The Myth Project ===
Directed by Liam Clancy and Patricia Rincon with artistic collaboration from Rebecca Bryant and composer Don Nichols, The Myth Project explores myths of warrior and military training. A collaborative, site-specific effort, it was performed at the NTC Promenade, formerly the Naval Training Center, in Point Loma, California. It aims to examine the essence of storytelling as a means to create social change through a blend of dance, theater, puppetry, and circus as a way to re-embody contemporary and ancient myths.

=== Adrift ===
Performed with Zirk Ubu and directed by Liam Clancy, Adrift is a moving meditation on the themes of Zen, vagabond, and welcoming the precarious into everyday life. Through the use of play, the idea of being unmoored, of letting go, and of allowing oneself to be swept away by forces outside of one's control are explored. As transient as it sounds, Adrift encourages the audience to leave behind familiar formulae and the safety of the known and realize the inevitable truth, continually found: there is nothing lacking.

=== Stilt Walking ===
With over a decade of experience performing on traditional 'echasse' peg stilts, teaching workshops, and constructing wooden stilts for performers, ACC continues to inspire with their audacious designs and inimitable presence, their stilt characters leaving beautiful and joyful impressions in the minds of their audience with every performance.

== Inspirations ==
Though neither puppeteer initially intended on pursuing the art as a profession, both were fascinated by the intricate, timeless performances within works such as The Dark Crystal and The Muppets by puppeteering legend Jim Henson, inspired as youths by his reification of puppeteering as an art as well as a practical, refined discipline in relation to a modern, mainstream audience. Gunn was especially moved by the themes of resistance, struggle, and perseverance as presented in The Dark Crystal from a very young age. Rountree was engaged by the storytelling quality of The Muppets and its ability to communicate difficult themes to young audiences.

Later on, Gunn was influenced by street performers such as stilt walkers while growing up in Vancouver, Canada while Rountree was introduced to the Handspring Puppet Company during an artist residency with teaching artists Rose Shakinovsky and Claire Gavronsky in Cape Town, South Africa. This, along with charcoal artist-turned-puppeteer William Kentridge's films, Ubu and the Truth Commission, served as major catalysts in their pursuing puppetry. As a pair, both also describe the anti-carceral, anti-imperialist, and anti-war sentiments and folksy yet larger-than-life productions of Bread & Puppet, created by German bakers-turned-puppeteers Elka and Peter Schumann, as transformative in how they viewed the boundaries of theater performance.

Animal Cracker Conspiracy is also heavily inspired by European styles of puppetry such as the use of more visible puppeteers in theater and street performance through giant puppets, marionettes, and stilt dancing.

=== Causes ===
Animal Cracker Conspiracy prioritizes social commentary through various shows and exhibitions, even developing the structure and form of various projects in response to multiple issues, such as the use of typically useless but recyclable materials and household objects, including cereal boxes, brass pins, and even toilet paper, and upcycling them to reimagine the boundaries of puppets. Other causes include:

- Inclusion
- Transformation
- Sustainability
- Equity
- Rebellion

ACC also hosts community workshops to engage with audiences and continue this ethos beyond the theater.

== Awards and Grants ==
2009: Sator Arts Foundation Grant
2010–20: Heather Beth Henson Fund
2010: Jim Henson Seed Grant
2011: Synergy Art Foundation Grant
2012: Jim Henson Foundation Project Grant
2012: Puffin Foundation Grant
2012: Techies Choice Award San Francisco Fringe
2012: Best of San Francisco Fringe
2012: Curated Choice New Orleans Fringe
2013: Creative Catalyst Fellowship
2014: Guthman Foundation Grant
2015: Jim Henson Foundation Project Grant
2015: Network of Ensemble Theatres Exchange Grant
2016: Eugene O'Neill Puppetry Conference, Waterford, CT
2017: Jim Henson Foundation Seed Grant
2018: Jim Henson Foundation Project Grant
