= Johan Randulf Rogge =

Norwegian politician

Johan Randulf Rogge (16 June 1859 – 20 January 1945) was a Norwegian politician for the Coalition Party.

He was elected to the Norwegian Parliament in 1907, representing the constituency Nygaard in Bergen. He worked as a merchant there, and was a member of Bergen city council for several years.
