= Zenon: Girl of the 21st Century =

1996 children's book by Marilyn Sadler

- Author: Marilyn Sadler
- Illustrator: Roger Bollen
- Genre: Children's literature Science fiction
- Publisher: Simon & Schuster Books for Young Readers
- Publication date: 1996
- Pages: 48
- ISBN: 978-0-689-80514-1

Zenon: Girl of the 21st Century is a 1996 children's science fiction picture book written by Marilyn Sadler and illustrated by Roger Bollen. In 1999, the book was adapted into a television film as the Disney Channel Original Movie Zenon: Girl of the 21st Century.

== Plot ==
The book narrates the story of Zenon Kar, a girl in the year 2037 who lives on a space station in the Milky Way. She is sent to her aunt on Earth to keep her out of trouble. She spends the summer on her grandparents' farm, learning their "old-fashioned" chores in their low-tech life. References in the novel are inspired by well-known science fiction characters.

== First edition ==
- Marilyn Sadler (1996). Zenon: Girl of the 21st Century. Illustrated by Roger Bollen. Simon & Schuster Books for Young Readers. p. 48. ISBN 978-0-689-80514-1.

== Series ==
The Zenon, Girl of the 21st Century series includes five books:

- Zenon: Girl of the 21st Century (1996)

Zenon's mischievous ways land her on Earth; while spending an entire summer at her grandparents' farm, she becomes a wiser and more mature person...gaining an appreciation for manual labor, and even helping to raise a litter of puppies.

- Bobo Crazy (2001)

Zenon is the only kid on Space Station 9 left without a Tobo: a robotic pet which can talk, fly, and even do homework. Instead, Zenon's dad buys her a cheap knockoff called a Bobo, which can't do homework or even talk! However, Bobo's loyalty compensates for his lack of intelligence...especially when an otherworldly phenomenon has all the Tobos going berserk and attacking their owners.

- Zenon Kar - Spaceball Star (2001)

After sitting on the bench all season, Zenon finally gets her chance to play spaceball when Grebba - the star of Space Station 9's team - is unable to participate in the championship game against Earth's team.

- The Trouble with Fun (2001)

Zenon agrees to entertain Teena, the well-behaved and polite daughter of an eminent Earth scientist. At least, she seems polite and well-behaved. Actually, Teena's idea of fun means breaking just about every rule she trips over...mostly because it's there. How will Zenon survive a girl who's basically herself to the tenth power?

- Stuck on Earth (2002)

Zenon and her friend Nebula sneak away from a class field trip to Earth, so that the girls can enter Zenon's latest invention - Galaxy Glue - in the 34th Annual World Science Fair at Cleveland, Ohio. En route, the girls are beset by numerous complications.
