= Handy Manny =

American television series

- Genre: Children's television series
- Created by: Roger Bollen; Marilyn Sadler
- Developed by: Rick Gitelson
- Directed by: Charles E. Bastien
- Voices of: Wilmer Valderrama; Dee Bradley Baker; Tom Kenny; Fred Stoller; Kath Soucie; Nika Futterman; Carlos Alazraqui; Grey DeLisle; Nancy Truman
- Opening theme: "Handy Manny Theme Song" performed by Los Lobos
- Ending theme: "Handy Manny Theme Song" (Instrumental)
- Composers: Fernando Rivas; Daniel Fernandez (season 3)
- Countries of origin: United States; Canada
- Original languages: English; Spanish
- No. of seasons: 3
- No. of episodes: 113 (208 segments) (list of episodes)

Production
- Executive producers: Marylin Sadler; Rick Gitelson; Roger Bollen; Scott Dyer
- Producers: Vanessa Tilley; Jane Sobol
- Running time: 24 minutes (12 minutes per segments); 20 minutes (specials); 30 minutes
- Production company: Nelvana Limited

Original release
- Network: Playhouse Disney
- Release: September 16, 2006 – January 17, 2011
- Network: Disney Junior
- Release: February 14, 2011 – February 14, 2013

Handy Manny is an animated television series for preschool age that premiered on September 16, 2006, originally as part of Disney Channel's Playhouse Disney block, and aired until February 14, 2013. It was created by Roger Bollen and Marilyn Sadler, developed for TV by Rick Gitelson and produced by Canada-based studio Nelvana Limited. It features the voices of Wilmer Valderrama, Dee Bradley Baker, Tom Kenny, Fred Stoller, Nika Futterman, Kath Soucie, Carlos Alazraqui, Grey DeLisle, and Nancy Truman. The theme song is performed by Los Lobos.

== Premise ==
Set in the fictional city of Sheetrock Hills, the titular character, Manny, is a handyman who owns a workshop where he works with his anthropomorphic talking tools.

== Episodes ==
Season	Segments	Episodes		Originally released		
Season	Segments	Episodes		First released	Last released	Network
1	50	26		September 16, 2006	October 8, 2007	Playhouse Disney
2	74	40		October 27, 2007	October 4, 2009	Playhouse Disney
3	38	47	19	November 7, 2009	January 17, 2011	Playhouse Disney
3	54	47	27	February 14, 2011	February 14, 2013	Disney Junior

== Characters ==
=== Manny and the Tools ===
- Manny Garcia (voiced by Wilmer Valderrama) is a handyman who lives in Sheetrock Hills and owns a workshop, working with the town's residents to help them with repairs and solve problems.
- Felipe (voiced by Carlos Alazraqui) is a yellow Phillips-head screwdriver who tends to be self-centered and overconfident. His ideas sometimes make problems much worse, which annoys Turner.
- Turner (voiced by Dee Bradley Baker) is a blue flat-head screwdriver who is very sarcastic and bossy to Felipe, usually going against Felipe's overconfidence, but does care for him.
- Pat (voiced by Tom Kenny) is a sky blue claw hammer who is very talkative, fun-loving, idealistic, and unintelligent. He sometimes struggles to control his strength, as he has to conceal his true strength.
- Dusty (voiced by Kath Soucie) is a red hand saw who is intelligent and gives advice. She acts as the big sister of the group and is very good at solving mysteries.
- Squeeze (voiced by Nika Futterman) is a green pair of pliers who is childlike and likes to help out a lot, but she can be a bit impatient to fix things.
- Stretch (voiced by Nika Futterman) is a pink tape measure who speaks with a lisp and can use his tape as an extendable hand. He is good at measuring and mathematics and has a good memory.
- Rusty (voiced by Fred Stoller) is an orange monkey wrench and the second-oldest tool. He is cowardly and easily scared, often needing reassurance from his fellow tools and Manny.
- Flicker (voiced by Grey DeLisle) is an orange and blue flashlight and the youngest of the tools. He flashes his light whenever he is excited.
- Zip (voiced by Eddie Deezen) is a power socket and a member of the Automotive Team, who is knowledgeable and very hardworking.
- Sneeze (voiced by Tom Kenny) is an aquamarine and orange vacuum cleaner and a member of the Automotive Team, who sneezes saw dust and other things.
- Ticks (voiced by Jesse Corti) and Totts (voiced by Cristobal Parson) are socket wrenches and twin brothers who are members of the Automotive Team. They are bilingual, as they speak English and Spanish.
- Roland (voiced by Bill Fagerbakke) is a toolbox who carries the members of the Automotive Team.
- Lefty (voiced by Mark DeCarlo), Lily (voiced by Grey DeLisle), and Junior (voiced by Kath Soucie) are combination wrenches and members of the Automotive Team, who are a happy family and support each other.
- Beamer (voiced by Steve Moreno) is a laser level who Carmella later takes in as her own tool.
- Spinner (voiced by Carlos Alazraqui) is a power tool who is considered the fastest power drill in Concrete Falls and is best friends with Jack.
- Jack (voiced by Daran Norris) is a jackhammer and one of the power tools.
- Pinzas (voiced by Kath Soucie) is a purple pair of needle nose pliers.
- Fix-It is a robotic dog who lives in Manny's workshop.

=== Residents of Sheetrock Hills ===
- Kelly (voiced by Nancy Truman) is a hardware store owner who almost always has the materials that Manny and his tools need for their projects.
- Mr. Lopart (voiced by Tom Kenny) is a very clumsy middle-aged man who is Mrs. Lopart's son and the owner of a candy store next to Manny's workshop. He often tries to fix objects on his own, initially declining Manny's offers of help before accepting after realizing that he cannot do it alone.
- Mrs. Lopart (voiced by Marion Ross) is Mr. Lopart's mother, who likes knitting, baking cookies, and bowling.
- Abuela Portillo (voiced by Shelley Morrison) is the owner of a bakery shop and Manny's neighbor, who has two grandsons, Alex and Quinn. She becomes Manny's paternal step-grandmother after marrying Abuelito Garcia in "Wedding Day", which reveals that her full name is Pilar Vargas Abuela Portillo and that Manny's full name was passed down from Abuelito. She has a Chihuahua named Carlos, who was a gift from her sister.
- Mr. Kumar (voiced by Brian George) is Manny's friend.
- Jackie Greenway (voiced by Jane Lynch) works at the local park and is a good friend of Manny and his tools.
- Jasmine Chung (voiced by Sandra Oh) is a reporter who works for Sheetrock Hills.
- Mrs. Thompson (voiced by Tonye Patano) owns a laundromat and is a teacher at the local preschool.
- Abuelito Garcia (voiced by Carlos Alazraqui) is Manny's grandfather, who is retired. He enjoys fishing and is knowledgeable about Aztec history.
- Chico Garcia (voiced by Mindy Burbano) is Manny's youngest nephew, who is very playful and curious.
- Mayor Rosa (voiced by Nancy Truman) is the mayor of Sheetrock Hills and a good friend of Manny and the tools. She enlists Manny's help with the community park.
- Carmela (voiced by Yeni Álvarez) is an old friend of Manny, who likes painting and sculpting.
- Gabriela (voiced by Nika Futterman) is a young friend of Manny, who loves playing soccer.
- Julieta Sánchez (voiced by Isabella Pájaro) is Señor Sánchez's granddaughter, who likes flowers, ballet, and soccer and has a pet cat named Patches. When she and Señor Sánchez moved to a new home, she is afraid as she believes that there is a monster in the closet, but overcomes her fear after learning it was her toy bear.
- Paulette (voiced by Giada De Laurentiis) likes to make pizza. She enlists Manny's help in repairing her dough rolling machine.
- Tanya (voiced by Dawnn Lewis) is the vendor of an ice cream stand. She enlists Manny's help in repairing her freezer.
- Susanna Alvarez (voiced by Isabella Pájaro) is a young girl who likes dolls and has a baby sister named Isabella. She was worried about having a sister, as she thought that her parents would not love her anymore, but Manny and the tools help her overcome her fear.
- Mrs. Hillary (voiced by Kathie Lee Gifford) is the music teacher at Sheetrock Hills Elementary School.
- Señor López (voiced by Mario Lopez) is a science teacher and meteorologist.
- Marcelo Ayala (voiced by Sebastián Guerrero) is the son of Mr. and Mrs. Ayala, who moved with them from Argentina to Sheetrock Hills. He likes to play soccer.
- Ginny (voiced by Florence Henderson) is the director of Snow White and the Seven Tools and the owner of Sheetrock Hills Playhouse Theatre.
- Dr. Ortega (voiced by Rosario Dawson) is a marine biologist.

=== Guest stars ===
Guest stars in the series include:

- Lance Bass as Elliot
- Annie Mumolo as Lola
- Kurtwood Smith as Mr. Noodlander
- Fred Willard as Dwayne
- Penn Jillette as Magic Marty
- Jon Polito as Joe Boletero
- Ashley Parker Angel as Will
- Wendie Malick as Miss Violet
- Shannon Durig as Aurelia
- Henry Winkler as Mr. Diller
- Dale Earnhardt Jr. as Chase Davis
- Freddy Rodríguez as Reuben
- Raini Rodriguez as Isabel Montoya
- Ed O'Neill as Mayor Johnson
- Denzel Whitaker as Kyle
- Dorian Harewood as Coach Johnson
- Zachary Gordon as Young Mr. Lopart
- Lauren Tom as Nelson and Young Mrs. Lee
- Rosario Dawson as Debbie
- Bob Glouberman as Sherman
- Rob Paulsen as Eddie
- Sinbad as Cal
- Michael Donovan as Hank
- Jim Belushi as Sal
- Ruth Livier as Lucia

== Release ==
=== Dubbed versions ===
A Spanish dub was aired within the "Disney Junior en Univision" sub-block on Univision's Planeta U block from May 31, 2014, to May 26, 2019, as was a Russian dub on Disney Channel Russia's Recognition Disney (later Disney Recognition) block, and a Hebrew dub on Hop! Channel, all alongside Mickey Mouse Clubhouse (the block on Disney Channel Russia had the exact same logos as Playhouse Disney) (with the exception of the block using the former branding) and Disney Junior (with the exception of the block using the latter branding).

TV5 aired the series dubbed in Tagalog as part of its "Disney Clubhouse/Disney Club" line-up.

On Disney+, several dubbed versions (whose languages were derived from Latin) were made available. In addition to Spanish, languages of these dubs include (but are not limited to) European and Brazilian Portuguese, Norwegian, French, Dutch, Danish and Swedish.

== Home media ==
Ten DVD compilations have been released.

DVD title	Release date		Episodes	Other information
	Region 2	Region 1		
Tooling Around	January 25, 2010	August 21, 2007	"Squeeze's Day Off" "Amigo Grande" "A Sticky Fix" "Pat the Screwdriver" "Supremoguy"	
Fixing It Right	TBA	February 19, 2008	"Manny to the Rescue" "Felipe Strikes Out" "Pat's Big Idea" "Rusty to the Rescue" "Detective Dusty"	
Manny's Pet Roundup	July 6, 2009	August 5, 2008	"Lyle and Leland Lopart" "Blackout on the Block" "Squeeze Makes a Promise" "Pet Problem" "Kitty Sitting" "Gopher Help" "Renaldo's Pretzel Castle"	All the episodes in this DVD are related to animals and pets.
Manny's Green Team	TBA	March 31, 2009	"Saving the Turtles" "Science Fair" "Manny Goes Solar" "Light Work" "Bloomin' Tools"	All the episodes in this DVD are related to recycling and caring for the earth.
A Very Handy Holiday	November 2, 2009	TBA	"A Very Handy Holiday" "Have a Handy New Year"	Language: English Subtitles: English, French, Italian, German, Spanish, Portuguese and Dutch.
Motorcycle Adventure	TBA	December 1, 2009	"Motorcycle Adventure" "A Very Handy Holiday"	
Big Race	TBA	April 20, 2010	"Big Race" "Fast Eddie's Scooter" "Bunny in the Basement"	
Happy Birthday!	April 26, 2010	TBA	"Cinco-De-Mayo"	"Piñata Party" "Skateboard Park"
Movie Night	October 11, 2010	June 18, 2013	"Movie Night" "Rusty's Little Light Lie" "Talent Show" "Danny Starr" "Elliot's New Job" "Singing Salon" "Manny's Mouse Traps"	
Big Construction Job	November 7, 2010	November 16, 2010	"Big Construction Job"/"Good Fences"/"Butterflies"	
