= Animal Crackers (comic strip) =

American comic strip

Animal Crackers is the title of several syndicated newspaper comics over the years. The first was a 1930 comic strip signed by an artist known simply as Lane.

The second Animal Crackers was a cartoon panel by Dick Ryan and Warren Goodrich (1913–2002) that was published intermittently from 1936 through 1952. In some papers it ran as Animal Krackers.

The third began on April 1, 1968 and continues today. It is distributed by Tribune Content Agency, and appears on Andrews McMeel Universal's GoComics, which is run by Universal Uclick.

== Animal Crackers (1936–1952) ==
Animal Crackers
- Animal Crackers cartoonist Warren Goodrich was best known for this single drawing, The Little Man, which he devised in 1942 for movie ratings in the San Francisco Chronicle.
- Author: Dick Ryan
- Illustrator: Warren Goodrich
- Current status/schedule: Running daily gag panel
- Launch date: January 27, 1936
- End date: 1952
- Alternate name: Animal Krackers
- Syndicate(s): Chicago Sun-Times Syndicate
- Genre: Humor

The San Francisco Chronicle described Animal Crackers as a "snappy little one-frame strip [that] featured a variety of animal life dealing with various silly situations of a human nature" and as a comic panel "which went on to acclaim in syndication." The San Francisco Chronicle printed the comic panel on its front page next to the weather report. Animal Crackers was syndicated by the Chicago Sun-Times to over 100 papers.

Goodrich recalled about the strip, "I used animals to relate human foibles with a little twist. Sometimes it would work, and sometimes it wouldn't. It seems the funny things are just short of tragic."

In later years, Goodrich drew a spin-off cartoon series, Creatures, collected in the book Creatures Or Not So Dumb Animals (Eden East Press, 2001). Although Goodrich drew his animal cartoons for years and then wrote newspaper columns ("Travelin' Man") and several books (An Artist's Life), his lasting fame came with a single drawing, "The Little Man," which he drew in 1942. Used alongside San Francisco Chronicle film reviews as a movie rating system, this Goodrich device was praised by Roger Ebert, Gerald Nachman, Austin Kleon, and other writers.

== Animal Crackers (1968–present) ==
Animal Crackers
- Author: Mike Osbun (2009–present)
- Illustrator(s): Roger Bollen (1967–1994); Fred Wagner (1994–2016); Mike Osbun (2016–present)
- Current status/schedule: Running daily gag panel
- Launch date: April 1, 1968
- Syndicate(s): Chicago Tribune New York News Syndicate
- Genre: Humor

=== Publication history ===
Roger Bollen is the creator the strip and did it from 1967 to 1994, and then Fred Wagner took over until his death in 2016. The strip is now drawn by long-time Animal Crackers writer, Mike Osbun. It features a group of animals who live in a fictional jungle called Freeborn. This strip was adapted into a Canadian animated television series in 1997.

=== Characters and story ===
- Lyle Lion — passive, insecure, and a mama's boy, Lyle Lion is not what one might call "King of the Jungle". He's more (of a Prince who is trying to be king) and intent on talking philosophy and ordering a pizza (preferably vegetarian) than be the dominant predator. His number one goal in life is to date Lana, being very persistent about it despite the multiple failed attempts; outside of that, his other goal is to be an astronomer. From the show, it is believed that he is left-handed.
- Dodo — he is the last remaining dodo alive, and is Lyle's best friend. Rash, impatient, and slightly self-centered, he is extremely hot-headed and refuses to believe that he lacks the ability to fly. This leads to multiple failed attempts to take flight, sometimes using some very innovative yet unusual techniques.
- Eugene — despite his size and nature, this pachyderm is really an "overgrown baby" who craves attention. He is rather arrogant and obnoxious and is not afraid to bully others with his size and strength to get what he wants. Some of his secret pleasures include inhaling loads of peanut butter and stomping petunias, but the sight of a tiny mouse will usually give him a fit.
- Gnu — for a "supposed" leader of a herd, Gnu lacks any leadership qualities; rather, his traits show the exact opposite of a leader: lazy, timid, no sense of direction. Despite his nature, Gnu does mean well and is very dedicated to his herd, even though his presence there will hinder rather than help. He is also a caring parent, as he is a single father who has one son that he loves very much.
- Lana — she is smart, attractive, strong minded, and the object of Lyle's affection. Lana is quite caring towards her fellow inhabitants of Freeborn, and will put the group ahead of herself. She is also an avid book lover, often found with her nose in a novel. Despite showing little to no interest in Lyle's pursuits, it has been hinted that perhaps she does have a crush on him; but only Lana knows the answer to that question, and her lips are sealed.
