= Jacques Bouchard =

Canadian marketing executive

- Born: August 29, 1930; Montreal, Quebec
- Died: May 29, 2006 (aged 75)
- Known for: Founder of one of the largest Francophone advertising agencies in Canada
- Awards: Order of Canada; National Order of Quebec

Jacques Bouchard, CM CQ (August 29, 1930 – May 29, 2006) was a Canadian advertising executive and author. He was one of the founders of Quebec's first French creative advertising agency, BCP, and a pioneer in French-language advertising.

He is mostly known for having written Les 36 cordes sensibles des Québécois, a book where he identifies thirty-six cultural traits of the Québécois which may be used in advertisement. He also co-founded advertising agency BCP in 1959, from which he retired in 1984 after passing on presidency to Yves Gougoux.

In 1999, he was made a Member of the Order of Canada. In 2002, he was made a Knight (Chevalier) of the National Order of Quebec.

Bouchard died of cancer on May 29, 2006. Following his death, his wife Caroline Bouchard established the Foundation Jacques-Bouchard, which assists severely ill patients spend their last days at home.
