= Roger Bollen =

American comic strip artist

- Born: July 27, 1941; East Cleveland, Ohio, U.S.
- Died: October 3, 2015 (aged 74); Mayfield Heights, Ohio, U.S.
- Occupations: Author, illustrator
- Spouse(s): Marilyn Sadler (Divorced); Audrey Curran
- Children: Melissa Ellsworth
- Writing career
- Genres: Juvenile fiction, comic strips
- Notable works: Funny Business; Animal Crackers; Catfish; Alistair series P.J. Funnybunny; Zenon film series Handy Manny

Roger (Rog) Bollen (July 27, 1941 – October 3, 2015) was an American writer and illustrator of comic strips and children's books, and a producer of television series that aimed at children.

== Early life and death ==
Born in East Cleveland, Ohio, he graduated from Shaw High School and Kent State University. During his final years, he lived in Chagrin Falls, Ohio. After suffering from a stroke and heart failure, he died in Hillcrest Hospital, Mayfield Heights, Ohio, on October 3, 2015. He was survived by his third wife Audrey Curran and his daughter Melissa Ellsworth.

== Syndicated comic strips ==
From 1966 to 1980, Bollen drew a two-panel cartoon strip titled Funny Business (in 1975, it was changed into a one-panel cartoon). From 1967 to 1994, Bollen wrote and drew the comic strip Animal Crackers (adapted into a 1997 animated TV series produced by Canada-based CINAR [now WildBrain] and aired on Fox Family [now Freeform]), his most successful feature which was translated into several languages. Bollen additionally drew the strip Catfish from 1973 to 1986.

== Children's books ==
Together with his second wife Marilyn Sadler, Bollen produced more than 50 children's books. Their first book, Alistair's Elephant, was published in 1983. Other notable books are the P.J. Funnybunny series and Zenon: Girl of the 21st Century (adapted into a live-action film series).

== Television shows ==
Bollen and Sadler together wrote Disney's CGI-animated children's TV series Handy Manny, where they also served as executive producers.
