= Bette Rogge =

American radio and television host

Bette Rogge Morse
- Born: June 14, 1922; Dayton, Ohio U.S.
- Died: January 20, 2015 (aged 92); Kettering, Ohio, U.S.
- Education: University of Dayton, Northwestern University, Columbia University
- Occupations: Television and radio broadcaster, talk show host
- Years active: 1951–2014
- Notable credit: The Bette Rogge Show
- Spouse: Wayne Morse
- Children: 2

Bette Rogge (June 14, 1922 – January 20, 2015) (married name Bette Morse) was an American radio and television host, talk show host and journalist. She was the "Grand Dame" of Dayton area broadcasting."

== Early life and education ==
Rogge was a graduate of University of Dayton (UD) and did post graduate work at Northwestern and Columbia Universities. She completed her masters degree at UD in 1977. During her studies, she presented commercial announcements for Jesse Philips at the Home Store.

== Career in radio and television ==
She began her radio career in the early 1950s at WSMK in Dayton, Ohio with Jack Wymer as the station announcer.

Rogge started on TV in the early 1950s with an exercise show called "The Perfect Pair," starring Bette and Toby Tobias, a fitness expert from the YMCA. She also worked on "Dietz & Rogge show", "Betty Bonner", "Meet the Boss", "Don's House" and many others.

Rogge was the Women's Editor and commercial announcer on the WHIO radio program, "Newspaper of the Air" each morning for four years.

From 1967 until 1972 Rogge had her own talk show, "The Bette Rogge Show," featuring such guests as Bob Hope, Lucille Ball, Liberace, William Shatner, the Nixon daughters, Mickey Rooney, Paul Lynde, Tommy Tune, Jerry Orbach, Lucie Arnaz, Pat O'Brien, and Tony Randall. Many of her guests were in town for headliner appearances in Kenley Players summer stock theatre productions.

Rogge also announced regular radio and television commercials for many local businesses. She worked two days a week at WBNS-TV and WLW~C TV in Columbus. In the 1950s, Bette did the first color TV commercial (Royal Crest Dairy) at WLW-D and the first color national television feed from Wright-Patterson Air Force Base with the Howdy Doody show team who were in Dayton for the Community Chest.

One of the highlights of her television career was special 30 minute TV tour of the White House in 1968 when President Lyndon Johnson hosted King Olav of Norway. Bette interviewed Liz Carpenter, Chef Henry Haller, the White House florist and was part of a reception held by Mrs.Johnson. She also was a guest at the Norwegian Embassy when King Olav entertained President Johnson. This 30 minute show was aired on WHIO-TV.

As a reporter, Rogge covered the lift-off of Apollo 14, interviewed astronauts and NASA officials and presented a Kittyhawk replica to local leaders. She covered the pre-opening of Disney World, did a special interview from the Goodyear Blimp, and a special TV hostess for the Dayton-based celebrity golf tournament Bogie Busters. She also did feature shows from the Indianapolis 500, including an interview with A. J. Foyt as they drove around the track. She also did a series of special interviews with Jack Lord of Hawaii Five-O and Don Ho when she was in Hawaii in 1970.

Rogge also appeared on the national Virginia Graham Show in New York with Erma Bombeck in 1968. Rogge had a theater background and appeared in a number of John Kenley's Kenley Players productions throughout Ohio. She was also featured in a number of national magazines.

In 1977 Rogge was included on the Dayton Daily News list of Dayton's Ten Top Women.

From 1995 until her death, Rogge hosted the cable TV show Cultural Scene, produced by Retha Phillips. She interviewed local and national personalities who have influence on our cultural life, including Cliff Robertson, Frank Borman, Buzz Aldrin, Benjamin Schuster, Chuck Yeager, Patricia Neal and many others.

In 2003, she was inducted into the Dayton Broadcasters Hall of Fame.

== University of Dayton ==
Rogge served as an adjunct professor at the University of Dayton, teaching communication. She later served on the university's board of trustees. In 1999 the university presented her with an Honorary Doctorate Degree. An award in her name is presented each year to an outstanding senior woman in the field of communication. Her papers and recordings of her radio and television shows are the subject of a collection at the University of Dayton Archives, where she and her husband, Wayne Morse, owner of a local advertising and public relations firm, also contributed a collection about the Kenley Players theater group.

== Community service ==
As well as her work at the University of Dayton, Rogge served the president of the local Salvation Army chapter and the Easter Seals.

== Death ==
Rogge died of natural causes at her home in Kettering, Ohio on January 20, 2015.
