= List of films featuring space stations =

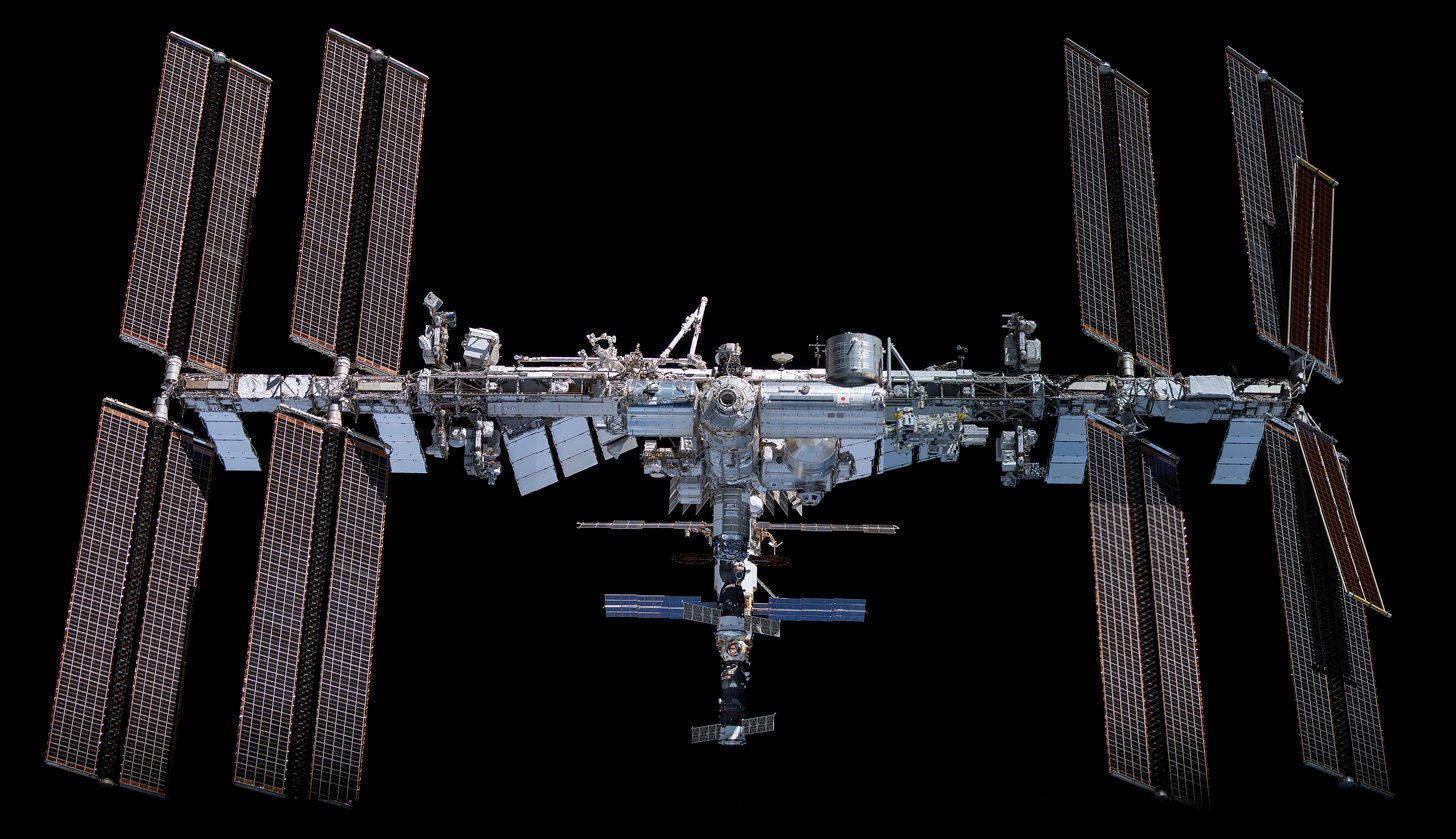
The International Space Station has been featured in several films, including Apogee of Fear, The Challenge, Yolki 5, Gravity, The Day After Tomorrow, Love, A Beautiful Planet and Space Station 3D.

There is a body of films that feature space stations. Science fiction films are the most popular genre to have featured both real-life space stations such as the International Space Station and Mir as well as fictional ones such as the Death Star and the Satellite of Love.

== List of films ==
=== Non-documentary films involving direct use of a real space station as a plot element ===
Film	Release year	Space station	Spacecraft transporting the crew	Spacecraft transporting the filming equipment	Cast aboard the space station during production	Time aboard on space station during production	Time shot on space station during production	Reference
Return from Orbit	1984	Salyut 7	Soyuz T-9	Soyuz T-9	Vladimir Lyakhov (Astronaut); Aleksandr Aleksandrov (Astronaut)	27 June - 23 November 1983 (149 days, 10 hours, 45 minutes)	Unknown	
Apogee of Fear	2012	International Space Station	Soyuz TMA-13/TMA-12/STS-124	Soyuz TMA-13/TMA-12	Yuri Lonchakov (Astronaut); Michael Fincke (Astronaut); Greg Chamitoff (Astronaut); Richard Garriott (Director)	14 - 24 October 2008 (11 days, 20 hours, 35 minutes)	8 minutes	
Yolki 5	2016	International Space Station	Soyuz TMA-16M/TMA-18M	Soyuz TMA-16M/TMA-18M/Soyuz MS-02	Mikhail Kornienko (Astronaut)	27 June - 23 November 1983 (340 days, 10 hours, 45 minutes)	3-4 minutes	
Yolki 5	2016	International Space Station	Soyuz MS-02	Soyuz MS-02	Andrey Borisenko (Astronaut)	21 October 2016 - 10 April 2017	3-4 minutes	
The Challenge (Vyzov)	2023	International Space Station	Soyuz MS-19/18	Progress MS-17/Soyuz MS-18	Anton Shkaplerov (Cosmonaut); Oleg Novitsky (Cosmonaut); Pyotr Dubrov (Cosmonaut); Klim Shipenko (Director); Yulia Peresild (Actress); Mark T. Vande Hei (Astronaut)	5 - 17 October 2021 (11 days, 12 hours, 52 minutes)	35-40 minutes	

=== Films involving indirect use of a real space station or partially fictionalized^{[A]} space station as a plot element ===
Film	Year	Space station	Notes	Ref.
Armageddon	1998	Mir		
A Beautiful Planet	2016	International Space Station		
Contact	1997	Mir		
The Day After Tomorrow	2004	International Space Station	Modified from the finalized ISS with some International segment modules removed, but with the planned expansions to the Russian segment included.	
Gravity	2013	International Space Station and Tiangong-1		
I.S.S.	2024	International Space Station		
Life	2017	International Space Station	Heavily modified to include additional pressurized modules	
Love	2011	International Space Station		
Marooned	1969	S-IVB Orbital Workshop	Similar to wet workshop designs considered for Skylab.	
Mission to Mars	2000	World Space Station	Appears to be the International Space Station modified to accommodate an Artificial gravity ring.	
Mission to Mir	1997	Mir		
Out of the Present	1995	Mir		
Salyut-7	2017	Salyut 7		
Searching for Skylab	2019	Skylab		
Space Explorers: The ISS Experience	2020	International Space Station		
Space Station 3D	2002	International Space Station		
Valerian and the City of a Thousand Planets	2017	Alpha (former International Space Station)	Incredibly modified, to the point of near nonrecognition. The structure of the modern ISS is only briefly seen in the opening montage.	

=== Films involving use of a fully fictionalized space station as a plot element ===
Film	Year	Space station	Ref.
51 Degrees North	2015		
2001: A Space Odyssey	1968	Space Station V	
3022	2019		
Ad Astra	2019	Norwegian biomedical research space station	
Aliens	1986	Gateway Station	
Alien: Romulus	2024	Renaissance	
Android	1982	Terraport Station ULC-53	
Arena	1989		
Assignment: Outer Space	1960	Zulu Extra 34	
Cargo	2009	Station 42	
The Cloverfield Paradox	2018	Cloverfield Station	
Conquest of Space	1955	The Wheel	
The Creator	2023	U.S.S. NOMAD	
Dante 01	2008	Dante 01	
Dark City	1998	The City	
Earth II	1971	Earth II	
Elysium	2013	Elysium	
Ender's Game	2013	Battle School	
Enemy Mine	1985		
Event Horizon	1997	Daylight Space Station	
Fortress 2: Re-Entry	2000		
Geostorm	2017	International Space Station IV	
The Green Slime	1968	Gamma III	
Hellraiser: Bloodline	1996	Minos	
Interstellar	2014	Cooper Station	
Io	2019		
Jason X	2002	Solaris research space station	
Lockout	2012	MS One	
Macross: Do You Remember Love?	1984	SDF-1	
Moonraker	1979		
Moonfall	2022	Unnamed SpaceX refueling station	
The Marvels	2023	S.A.B.R.E Space Station	
Mutiny in Outer Space	1965		
Mystery Science Theater 3000: The Movie	1996	Satellite of Love	
The Noah's Ark Principle	1984	Florida Arklab	
Oblivion	2013	The Tet	
Planet of the Apes	2001	Oberon	
Project Moonbase	1953		
Queen of Outer Space	1958		
Rampage	2018		
Red Planet	2000	High Orbit Space Station / Mars-1	
Robotech: The Shadow Chronicles	2006	Space Station Liberty	
Rogue One: A Star Wars Story	2016	Death Star	
Solaris	1972	Solaris Station	
Solaris	2002	Prometheus Station	
Space Buddies	2009	Russian Research Space Station (R.R.S.S)	
SpaceCamp	1986	Daedalus	
Space Station 76	2014	Omega 76 Space Station	
Star Crystal	1986		
Star Trek Beyond	2016	Yorktown	
Star Trek: The Motion Picture	1979	Orbital office complex	
Star Trek II: The Wrath of Khan	1982	Regula I	
Star Trek III: The Search for Spock	1984	Earth Spacedock	
Star Trek IV: The Voyage Home	1986	Earth Spacedock	
Star Trek V: The Final Frontier	1989	Earth Spacedock	
Star Trek VI: The Undiscovered Country	1991	Earth Spacedock	
Star Wars: Episode I – The Phantom Menace	1999	Droid Control Ship	
Star Wars: Episode III – Revenge of the Sith	2005	Death Star	
Star Wars: Episode IV - A New Hope	1977	Death Star	
Star Wars: Episode VI - Return of the Jedi	1983	Death Star II	
Starship Troopers	1997	Ticonderoga	
Starship Troopers: Invasion	2012	Fort Casey	
Stowaway	2021		
Thunderbirds	2004	Thunderbird 5	
Thunderbird 6	1968	Thunderbird 5	
Tik Tik Tik	2018		
Titan A.E.	2000	Salvage Station TAU 14; New Bangkok	
War of the Planets	1966		
Zenon: Girl of the 21st Century	1999		
Zenon: The Zequel	2001		
Zenon: Z3	2004		

== Notes ==
A. Partially fictionalized meaning either directly based on a heavily studied real concept/station (e.g. the S-IVB Orbital Workshop in Marooned), or an extension of an existing modern station (e.g. the World Space Station in Mission to Mars being an extension of the International Space Station.) Some stations share the name of real space stations (e.g. the International Space Station IV in Geostorm) but are otherwise unrelated, these are in the "fully fictionalized" category.

== See also ==
The following films also include spacecraft that have also been called space stations by outside sources:

- Silent Running (1972), which features the space freighter Valley Forge
- The Fifth Element (1997), which features the space liner Fhloston Paradise
- WALL-E (2008), which features the generation ship Axiom
- The Wandering Earth (2019), features the International Space Station, which despite its name, follows the same interstellar trajectory of the aforementioned wandering Earth.

== Bibliography ==
- Westfahl, Gary (2009). Islands in the Sky: The Space Station Theme in Science Fiction Literature. Borgo Press. ISBN 978-1-4344-0356-8.
