= Phillip Rhys Chaudhary =

British actor and director (born 1972)

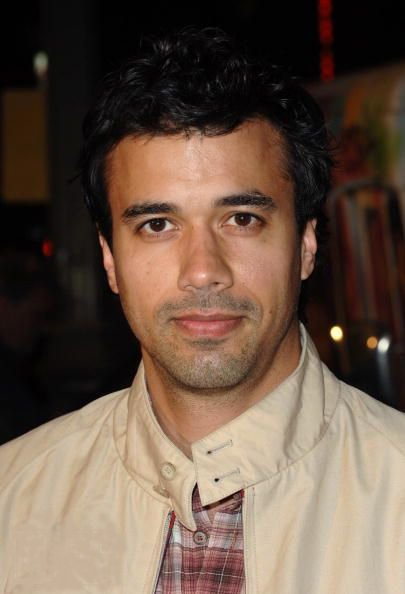
- Chaudhary in 2010
- Born: Philippe Chaudhary; June 14, 1972 (age 54); London, United Kingdom
- Occupations: Actor, director
- Years active: 1997–present
- Website: www.philliprhys.com

Philippe Chaudhary (born June 14, 1972), known professionally as Phillip Rhys Chaudhary, is a British actor and director. His acting credits include the notable series 24, Dr. Who, FX's The Full Monty, Nip/Tuck, BBC's Survivors, and Shameless. He is also known for his role as rockstar Proto Zoa in the Disney Channel Original Movie Zenon: Girl of the 21st Century and its sequel Zenon: The Zequel.

== Biography ==
Chaudhary was born in London to Gisele Klotza. He was the second of three children. His grandmother, Janine Klotza, was a French prima ballerina in the 1920s. His father was a Ugandan-born Punjabi.

He began his acting career in the late 1990s, gaining recognition in the U.S. with his portrayal of Reza Naiyeer in the second season of the Fox drama 24. The ensemble cast including Chaudhary was nominated for a Screen Actors Guild Award in 2002.

Chaudharry played rockstar Proto Zoa in the first two Zenon movies, Zenon: Girl of the 21st Century and Zenon: The Zequel. His role was recast for the third installment, Zenon: Z3, due to scheduling conflicts.

He appeared as a guest in season 2 of Heston's Feasts.

He directed the award-winning Tribeca Festival short film The Scarecrow (2015) starring Sandra Oh. He directed an episode of The Good Doctor in season 6.

== Personal life ==
He is married to Helen Hamber Rhys, a model and stylist. They have one son together and reside in Los Angeles.

On November 22, 2008, Rhys appeared on Soccer AM and confirmed he supports Crystal Palace Football Club.

== Filmography ==
=== Television ===
Year(s)	Title	Role	Notes	Ref.
1999	The Seventh Scroll	Tanus		
1999	Undressed	Jonathan		
2002	Flatland	Quentin Mitchell		
2002–2003	24	Reza Naiyeer		
2003–2005	Nip/Tuck	Jude Sawyer		
2007	Bones	Clark Lightner		
2008–2010	Survivors	Al Sadiq		
2010	Warehouse 13	Perry	1 episode	
2015	Doctor Who	Ramone	1 episode ("The Husbands of River Song")	
2015	Tripped	Pete		
2017	Rosewood	Raymond Larsen	1 episode	
2018	Nightflyers	Murphy		
2019	Pretty Little Liars: The Perfectionists	Michael Jalali		
2019–2020	Tell Me a Story	Damien Hewett		
2021	Shameless	Marcos Hanisian	1 episode ("NIMBY")	
2023	The Rookie: Feds	Chase Harrison	1 episode	
2023	The Full Monty	Dilip		

=== Film ===
Year(s)	Title	Role	Notes	Ref.
1998	Woundings	Julian Burns		
1999	Zenon: Girl of the 21st Century	Proto Zoa	Television film	
1999	Kill the Man	Seth		
1999	The Fear: Resurrection	Mitch		
2001	Zenon: The Zequel	Proto Zoa	Television film	
2001	Farewell, My Love	Luc		
2007	Americanizing Shelley	Neil Brar		
2010	The Space Between	Maliq		
2011	The Adventures of Tintin	Co-pilot/French medic		
2013	The Magnificent Eleven	Ramesh		
2013	Salomé	The Young Syrian		
