= Zenon: The Zequel =

2001 American television film

- Promotional poster
- Genre: Adventure; Comedy
- Based on: Zenon: Girl of the 21st Century by Marilyn Sadler & Roger Bollen
- Written by: Stu Krieger
- Directed by: Manny Coto
- Starring: Kirsten Storms; Lauren Maltby; Phillip Rhys; Holly Fulger; Stuart Pankin; Robert Curtis Brown; Susan Brady; John Getz; Shadia Simmons; Tom Wright
- Theme music composer: Sabelle Breer; Jamie Dunlap; Stu Krieger; Phil Marshall; Bill Pearson; Kristian Rex
- Country of origin: United States
- Original language: English

Production
- Producers: Diane Gutterud; Suzanne Coston; Suzanne de Passe; Stu Krieger
- Cinematography: Donald Duncan
- Editors: Benjamin D. Stokes; Terry Stokes
- Running time: 89 minutes
- Production companies: de Passe Entertainment; Manny Coto Productions

Original release
- Network: Disney Channel
- Release: January 12, 2001

Related
- Zenon: Girl of the 21st Century; Zenon: Z3

Zenon: The Zequel is a 2001 American science fiction comedy film directed by Manny Coto. It is the second installment of the Disney Channel's Zenon television film series, following the first installment, Zenon: Girl of the 21st Century (1999), and preceding Zenon: Z3 (2004). The film premiered on Disney Channel on January 12, 2001. The film is also the first sequel to be produced under the Disney Channel Original Movie banner.

This is the only Zenon film where Raven-Symoné does not play Nebula. She is replaced by Shadia Simmons.

The Disney Channel Original Series Lizzie McGuire premiered after the film's premiere.

This is the last film directed by Manny Coto before his death in 2023.

== Plot ==
The year is 2051, for which Zenon Kar is 15 now, and none the wiser about the dangers of meddling. When she shows Nebula a new game and how to play it, she inadvertently empties out Commander Plank's office and is assigned work detail in the Alien Patrol lab. It is also revealed that Greg broke up with her. The space station is now under command of the military and General Hammond is assigned to command the station. He assigns Zenon to look after his daughter who turns out to be her old nemesis, Margie, who's demanding and threatens to have her dad kick Zenon and her family off the space station if Zenon doesn't obey her.

Zenon sneaks down to Earth after getting a message from aliens that seem to want to meet with Proto Zoa. Margie sneaks down to Earth as well, making it look like Zenon forced her to come along. With the help of Aunt Judy, the girls track down Proto Zoa, who has become a recluse after feeling he has passed the apex of his career due to his space concert, and convince him to join them. With Margie, Aunt Judy, Nebula, Orion the Alien Patrol lab guy, Proto Zoa, and her mother, Zenon goes to meet with the aliens near the Moon. However, their ship runs out of fuel and they nearly crash to their deaths on the Moon, but the aliens show up and rescue them. After Zenon meets the aliens on the Moon, they turn out to be friendly and, communicating with Zenon telepathically, reveal that they have been lost in space for three years and need the ship's navigation charts to get home, thinking it impolite to just take them.

After getting the charts, they then tow the ship back to the space station, where General Hammond refuses to relent, correctly pointing out that the space station is too dangerous to live on due to the extensive damage from the sabotage. Margie stands up to him for once, but it isn't enough until the aliens return. They push the space station back into orbit and return the previously decommissioned sections as a thank-you gift for helping them. With the space station saved, Commander Plank and General Hammond agree to share command. Plank and Aunt Judy get married at a wedding at which Proto Zoa plays, dedicating his new song to Zenon for his having been revitalized by the whole experience. It's also realized that the aliens were actually trying to communicate with Zenon, not Proto Zoa, and they're using the transmission of his old concert to do so. Margie convinces her father to let her stay and she and Zenon become friends while Zenon gets a possible love interest in Orion.

== Cast ==
- Kirsten Storms as Zenon Kar
- Lauren Maltby as Margie Hammond, Zenon's former rival
- Phillip Rhys as Proto Zoa, Zenon's idol
- Holly Fulger as Judy Kling-Plank, Zenon's aunt
- Stuart Pankin as Commander Edward Plank, Judy's husband and Zenon's uncle
- Robert Curtis-Brown as Mark Kar, Zenon's father
- Susan Brady as Astrid Kar, Zenon's mother
- John Getz as General Hammond, Margie's father
- Shadia Simmons as Nebula Wade, Zenon's best friend
- Tom Wright as Orion, Zenon's second love interest
- Michael Saccente as Lieutenant Hart
- Rupert Simmonds as Polaris
- Nicko Vella as Corvus
- Jennifer Rucker as Carla Wade, Nebula's mother
- Stephen Lovatt as Wills

== See also ==
- List of films featuring extraterrestrials
- List of films featuring space stations
