= Mr. Rhodes =

American television sitcom

- Created by: Jennifer Heath; Mark Brazill; Peter Noah
- Starring: Tom Rhodes; Farrah Forke; Stephen Tobolowsky; Jessica Stone; Shaun Weiss; Lindsay Sloane; Alexandra Holden; Travis Wester; Ron Glass
- Composer: Mark Heyes
- Country of origin: United States
- Original language: English
- No. of seasons: 1
- No. of episodes: 19 (2 unaired)

Production
- Executive producers: Peter Noah; Mark Brazill; Jennifer Heath; Michael Rotenberg; Dave Becky
- Camera setup: Multi-camera
- Running time: 30 minutes
- Production companies: NBC Studios; Universal Television

Original release
- Network: NBC
- Release: September 23, 1996 – March 10, 1997

Mr. Rhodes is an American television sitcom which was aired by NBC as part of its 1996–97 lineup.

== Summary ==
Mr. Rhodes starred comedian Tom Rhodes as an eponymous character, a novelist whose first novel was a critical hit but a commercial failure. He takes a teaching position at his old small-town preparatory school, where he meets the girl of his dreams, Nikki (Farrah Forke), the guidance counselor.

== Reception ==
Reviews were mixed overall, though The New York Times gave the premiere a glowing review, calling it "a delightfully off-center sitcom". They said that, while it was "another teacher-faculty-students romp", it was "closer to the film Dead Poets Society than to classic prime-time exercises like Welcome Back, Kotter or Head of the Class."

== Cancellation ==
The series was not picked up for another season and the last broadcast was in March 1997. Farrah Forke and Stephen Tobolowsky had starred together in another short-lived sitcom, Dweebs, just the year before, which was created by Mr. Rhodes co-creator Peter Noah.

== Cast ==
=== Main Cast ===
- Tom Rhodes as Tom Rhodes
- Farrah Forke as Nikki Harkin
- Stephen Tobolowsky as Ray Heary
- Jessica Stone as Amanda Reeves
- Shaun Weiss as Jake Mandelleer
- Lindsay Sloane as Zoey Miller
- Alexandra Holden as Dani Swanson
- Travis Wester as Ethan Armstrong
- Ron Glass as Ronald Felcher

=== Recurring ===
- Jason Dohring as Jaret
- Jensen Ackles as Malcolm

== Episodes ==
No.	Title	Directed by	Written by	Original release date
1	"Pilot"	Peter Bonerz	Mark Brazill, Jennifer Heath, Peter Noah	September 23, 1996
2	"The Crush Show"	Ted Wass	Mark Brazill	September 30, 1996
3	"Tom Moves In"	Ted Wass	Mark Brazill	October 7, 1996
4	"Nikki Quits Therapy"	Ted Wass	Ted Cohen & Andrew Reich	October 14, 1996
5	"Heary's Camera"	Brian K. Roberts	Mark Brazill	October 21, 1996
6	"The Halloween Show"	Brian K. Roberts	Mark Brazill	October 28, 1996
7	"Death, Lice and Videotape"	Brian K. Roberts	Mark Brazill	November 4, 1996
8	"Looking for Mrs. Goodbar"	Brian K. Roberts	Eric Cohen	November 11, 1996
9	"Amanda's Fix-up Show"	Max Tash	Michele J. Wolff	November 18, 1996
10	"The Thanksgiving Show"	Robert Berlinger	Ted Cohen & Andrew Reich	November 25, 1996
11	"The Christmas Show"	John Rich	Eric Cohen	December 16, 1996
12	"The Sexism Show"	Robert Berlinger	Jay Scherick	January 6, 1997
13	"The Courtroom Show"	John Rich	Ted Cohen & Andrew Reich	January 13, 1997
14	"The Italian Show"	Robert Berlinger	Mark Brazill	January 20, 1997
15	"The Welcome Back Show"	Brian K. Roberts	Mark Brazill	February 3, 1997
16	"Tom's Not Headmaster Show"	Robert Berlinger	Mark Brazill	February 17, 1997
17	"The Valentine Show"	Brian K. Roberts	Jay Scherick & David Ronn	March 10, 1997
18	"Feud for Thought"	TBD	TBD	UNAIRED
19	"The Goat Show"	TBD	TBD	UNAIRED
