= Farrah Forke =

American actress (1968–2022)

- Born: Farrah Rachael Forke; January 12, 1968; Corpus Christi, Texas, U.S.
- Died: February 25, 2022 (aged 54); Houston, Texas, U.S.
- Other name: Farrah R. Forke
- Occupation: Actress
- Years active: 1991–2005
- Spouse: Mark Layton Brown
- Children: 2

Farrah Rachael Forke (January 12, 1968 – February 25, 2022) was an American actress best known for her roles as Alex Lambert on the NBC sitcom Wings and Mayson Drake on Lois and Clark: The New Adventures of Superman. She also voiced the character Big Barda on the animated television series Batman Beyond and Justice League Unlimited, starred as Carey on the short-lived cult sitcom Dweebs, Nikki Harkin on Mr. Rhodes, Carol Ashby in the pilot episode of the 90's remake of Fantasy Island, and appeared in several made-for-TV movies such as Nurses on the Line (1993), Journey to the Center of the Earth (1993), Bionic Ever After? (1994), and theatrical movies like Disclosure (1994) and Heat (1995).

== Early life ==
Forke was born in Corpus Christi, Texas. She was one of two children of Chuck Forke and Beverly (Mendleski). Forke was named after Farrah Fawcett, who was a family friend. In an interview, she said: "I was a huge fan of hers, thinking as a child 'If she can do it so can I.'" She attended the Hockaday School, an all-girls private school in Dallas, where she was a cheerleader. She started acting with a role in a Texas production of the musical The Rocky Horror Show. After graduating from high school, she relocated to New York City in 1989 to study acting at the Lee Strasberg Institute. She also worked as a bartender while studying in the city.

== Career ==
Forke made her feature debut in the 1991 film Brain Twisters.

=== Wings ===
She became best known as Alex Lambert for two seasons on the NBC sitcom Wings. Only her second professional acting role, it became one of her biggest roles.

She said she was nervous during the early episodes. "I was so green and so nervous," she said. "There were so many people around, and four cameras. My hands used to shake in the early episodes. You'll see me holding coffee cups with both hands to control the shaking." She drew on personal experience to play the character, who was not at all like the actress. "I am really nothing like her," she said in an interview, "but the toughness I got to display as a real bartender in New York at closing time prepared me for the role of Alex. I would lower the tone of my voice to show I meant business and I used that in my audition. I knew I could play her."

Overall, the part taught the young actress a lot. "It was a great learning experience. I learned so much, especially from Steven Weber and Tony Shalhoub." The part was a recurring role during the 1992–93 season, the fourth season of the show, and a regular cast role the following year, the fifth season.

Forke was upset not to be asked back for the sixth season as a regular cast member. The writers found the Alex character difficult to write for and felt they had run out of stories for the character and wanted to explore her onscreen boyfriend Brian's (played by Weber) single life instead. Forke was asked back for a guest appearance in one episode of the sixth season, which gave a conclusion to her character.

=== Post-Wings, Lois & Clark, Justice League and other roles ===
After Wings, Forke starred as Carey, an office manager for a computer software company, in the short-lived CBS sitcom Dweebs (1995), and then, from 1996 to 1997, a guidance counselor at a prep school in NBC's Mr. Rhodes. She also appeared on Ned and Stacey with her Wings castmate Thomas Haden Church. Forke was the voice woman of several companies, such as Arby's, Cadillac, Checkers, and Vanderbilt.

Forke had a recurring role on Lois and Clark as Mayson Drake, an attorney who considers Superman a vigilante, but holds a candle for Clark Kent.

Forke would once again take part in the Superman universe by voicing the character Big Barda in two episodes of Batman Beyond and one episode of Justice League Unlimited, animated shows set in the same universe as Superman: The Animated Series.

In films, she featured in Academy Award winner Barry Levinson's Disclosure (1994), Michael Mann's Heat (1995), and Ground Control (1998). She appeared in Kate's Addiction (1998), in which she and actress Kari Wuhrer play women in a lesbian love affair, as well as the TV-movies Nurses on the Line: The Crash of Flight 7 (CBS, 1993) with Lindsay Wagner. Other TV movie roles include Journey to the Center of the Earth (NBC, 1993), Complex of Fear (CBS, 1993), Bionic Ever After? (CBS, 1994) (again with Wagner), and Abandoned and Deceived (ABC, 1995).

Her final onscreen role was in the 2001 movie It Is What It Is directed by Billy Frolick. Forke was very proud of the role. "It's by far the best work I've ever done," she said in a 2003 interview. She also served as executive producer on the movie. Around the time of the 2003 interview, she moved to New Mexico and, though mentioned she was planning to return to LA for pilot season, seemingly decided to retire permanently from acting, later moving back to Texas. She would later say: "I have no plans to return to Hollywood. I love my life here in Texas, raising my twin boys. Life is good." She had one more role, a voice role, in 2005, resuming her voice work as Big Barda in Justice League Unlimited.

== Personal life ==
Forke underwent plastic surgery in 1989, when she was 21, to receive silicone breast implants. However, the implants later ruptured and caused her health complications. She consequently had them removed four years later in February 1993. She then filed a lawsuit in Houston on March 24 of the following year against Dow Corning, the Dow Chemical Company, the Inamed Corporation and the McGhan Corporation.

She was friends with actress Caroline Aaron, who played Mary Pat Lee on Wings. The two featured together in Forke's last episode of the series.

Forke met Mark Layton Brown while he was working in the art department of Wings. Together, they had twin sons. She took a hiatus from acting during the early 2000s and returned to Texas to raise her children, eventually deciding the hiatus would become a permanent retirement from Hollywood.

=== Death ===
Forke died at her home in The Woodlands, Texas, on February 25, 2022, at the age of 54. She had been battling cancer in the years leading up to her death.

Many tributes were paid to her, including from her castmate Steven Weber, who played her onscreen boyfriend Brian in Wings, saying: "She was every bit as tough, fun, beautiful and grounded as her character "Alex" on Wings."

== Filmography ==
Year	Title	Role	Notes
1991	Brain Twisters	Laurie Stevens	
1992–1995	Wings	Alex Lambert	35 episodes
1993	Complex of Fear	Vicki	
1993	Nurses on the Line: The Crash of Flight 7	Fran Markoe	
1993	Journey to the Center of the Earth	Dr. Margo Peterson	Television film
1994	Bionic Ever After?	Kimberly Haviland/Harmon	
1994	Disclosure	Adele Lewyn	
1994–1995	Lois & Clark: The New Adventures Of Superman	Mayson Drake	4 episodes
1995	A Whole New Ballgame	Angela	Episode: "Brett's Beef"
1995	Favorite Deadly Sins	Mrs. Spencer	Television film
1995	Heat	Claudia	
1995	Abandoned and Deceived	Sarah	
1995	Dweebs	Carey	10 episodes
1996	Ned and Stacey	Megan Foster	Episode: "A Tender Trap"
1996–1997	Mr. Rhodes	Nikki Harkin	17 episodes
1997	Duckman	Herself	Voice, episode: "Aged Heat 2: Women in Heat"
1998	Jenny	Kyra Campbell	Episode: "A Girl's Gotta Hang with a Celebrity"
1998	Grown-Ups	Jeanie	Television film
1998	Ground Control	Laura Franklin	
1998	Fantasy Island	Carol Ashby	Episode: "Pilot"
1999	Kate's Addiction	Sara	
1999	Hitman's Run	Sarah	
1999	Party of Five	Tracy	3 Episodes
2000	Batman Beyond	Big Barda / Barda Free	Voice, episode: "The Call"
2001	It Is What It Is	Teresa	
2005	Justice League Unlimited	Big Barda / Barda Free	Voice, episode: "The Ties That Bind"
