= Peter Noah =

American television writer and producer

- Occupations: Television writer, producer
- Relatives: Timothy Noah (brother); Adam Levine (nephew)

Peter Noah is an American television writer and producer.

== Personal life ==
His brother is journalist Timothy Noah, and his nephew is Maroon 5 frontman Adam Levine. His father was television game show producer Robert Noah.

== Career ==
He served as an executive producer and regular writer for the NBC drama series The West Wing. Noah first became involved with the series as a consulting producer and regular writer for the fifth season and was promoted to supervising producer before the season's end. He continued in this role for the sixth season before becoming an executive producer for the seventh and final season.

Along with his fellow producers, he was nominated for a Primetime Emmy Award for Outstanding Drama Series for three consecutive years (2004–2006) for his work on The West Wing. In 2006, he was also nominated for a Writers Guild of America Award for Television: Dramatic Series. Noah went on to executive produce The West Wing star Jimmy Smits's next television series Cane.

In the mid-1990s, he created the short-lived sitcom Dweebs (1995) and co-created another short-lived sitcom, Mr. Rhodes (1996–1997). He has also written on The Firm, Scandal, Kingdom, Designated Survivor, and The Diplomat.
