= Francess Lantz =

American novelist

Francess Lin Lantz
- Lantz with her surfboard
- Born: August 27, 1952; Trenton, New Jersey, United States
- Died: November 22, 2004 (aged 52); Santa Barbara, California, United States
- Occupations: Librarian, writer
- Spouses: Jonathan Ostrowsky (m. 1973) John Landsberg (until 2004)
- Children: 1

Francess Lin Lantz (August 27, 1952 – November 22, 2004) was an American children's librarian turned fiction writer.

== Early years ==
Born in Trenton, New Jersey on August 27, 1952, Lantz was raised in Bucks County, Pennsylvania. She initially aspired to become a rock musician and composer and did some classical music composition. She married Jonathan Ostrowsky on April 28, 1973. She graduated in 1974 from Dickinson College and from Simmons College in 1975, where she earned a master's degree in library sciences. She later married John Landsberg and they had one son.

== Career ==
Lantz worked as a children's librarian in Massachusetts after graduating from Simmons. Her first book, Good Rockin' Tonight, which was somewhat autobiographical, was published in 1982. She moved to Santa Barbara in 1986 and took up surfing.

For more than two decades Lantz wrote over 30 books, including several juvenile bestsellers. She was selected for the American Library Association Best Books for Young Adults for her 1997 romance Someone to Love. Stepsister from Planet Weird (Random House, 1996) was made into a Disney Channel television movie in 2000.

Her books in the Luna Bay monthly series, featuring stories about tween girl surfers, were sponsored by Roxy, a clothing company in California in partnership with HarperCollins. The series had an initial print run of 1,250,000 copies. Lantz, who was a surfer herself, said she was never pressured to promote products or brands with her writing.

== Illness and death ==
Diagnosed with ovarian cancer circa 1999, she died at the age of fifty-two in Santa Barbara, California in 2004.

== Publications ==
Lantz authored more than 30 books and articles including:

- Woodstock Magic (Avon, 1986)ISBN 0380751291
- Fade Far Away (HarperCollins, 1998) ISBN 038097553X
- Stepsister from Planet Weird (Random House, 1996) ISBN 0788761579
- You're the One series
- Luna Bay surfer girl series
