= Journey to the Center of the Earth (1993 film) =

- Film Poster
- Genre: Sci-fi
- Based on: Journey to the Center of the Earth by Jules Verne
- Screenplay by: David M. Evans; Robert Gunter
- Directed by: William Dear
- Starring: David Dundara; Farrah Forke; Tim Russ; Jeffrey Nordling; John Neville; Fabiana Udenio
- Narrated by: David Dundara
- Theme music composer: David Kurtz; Christopher Franke
- Country of origin: Canada; United States
- Original language: English
- No. of episodes: 1

Production
- Producer: John Ashley
- Cinematography: Ronald Víctor García
- Editor: Barry L. Gold
- Running time: 90 minutes
- Production company: Columbia Pictures Television

Original release
- Network: NBC
- Release: February 28, 1993

Journey to the Center of the Earth is a 1993 TV film first aired on NBC. Starring Oscar-winning actor F. Murray Abraham and sitcom actress Farrah Forke, the film doubled as a pilot for a possible TV series. The film is based on the 1864 novel of the same name by Jules Verne, about scientists trapped in a subterranean world.

Other cast members include David Dundara, Jeffrey Nordling, Tim Russ, John Neville, and Kim Miyori. Outside the United States, the film was released theatrically in other territories by Columbia Pictures.

== Plot ==
A team of explorers sets on a voyage to the Earth's core, following an earlier attempt years before. Their ship, Avenger, enters the lava chamber of an active volcano and uses an energy ray called a "sonic blaster" to blast through the flow. They enter in a subterranean world over 100 kilometers below the Earth's surface. The place is filled with many strange creatures. As they explore deeper into the caverns they encounter a yeti which the crew named Dallas that serves as their guide. Meanwhile, an unknown malevolent entity is attempting to recover the missing pieces of an Atlantean artifact known as the "book of knowledge" one of which a crew member of the Avenger brought with him, that will supposedly give massive powers to whoever possesses it.

== Cast ==
- David Dundara as Anthony LaStrella
- Farrah Forke as Dr. Margo Peterson
- Kim Miyori as Dr. Tesue Ishikawa
- John Neville as Dr. Cecil Chalmers
- Jeffrey Nordling as Chris Turner
- Tim Russ as Joe Briggs
- Carel Struycken as Dallas
- Fabiana Udenio as Sandra Miller
- Justina Vail as Devin
- F. Murray Abraham as Professor Harlech
- Francis Guinan as Mr. Wentworth
- Cassie Byram as Secretary
- Connie Craig as Student #1
- Doug Freimuth as Student #2
- Ben Cleaveland as Student #3
