= Holly Fulger =

American actress

- Occupation: Actress
- Years active: 1986–present
- Spouse: Buzz Feiten

Holly Fulger is an American actress. She is best known for her roles as Robin Dulitski in Anything but Love and as Holly Jamison on Ellen.

In 2018, she started a non-profit True Beauty Discovery.

== Early life ==
Holly Fulger is the daughter of Herb and Florence Fulger. She has a brother and a sister. She graduated from Lakewood High School and attended Hiram College. She was an exchange student in Austria for six months, and she received an internship to the Great Lakes Shakespeare Festival. She gained much of her training in the theater in Chicago. She worked as a model and a waitress and acted without pay in local theaters before she obtained a professional acting role.

== Career ==
She starred in the American premiere of Road, Our Country's Good and Lloyd's Prayer, and plays at the Goodman Theatre with Tony award-winning director Robert Falls. She has guest-starred on many notable TV series such as Without a Trace in 2006. She also had notable recurring roles on thirtysomething and 7th Heaven.

Her most notable roles to date may be her regular roles on the television series Anything But Love and These Friends of Mine, which was renamed Ellen after the first year. She also had a notable role in the Zenon TV movie trilogy on Disney Channel as the protagonist's Aunt Judy.

Since 2014, she has hosted The Hollywood Beauty Detective as a creator.

== Personal life ==
Fulger married musician Buzz Feiten in December 1993.

== Filmography ==
=== Film ===
Year	Title	Role	Notes
1989	An Innocent Man	Yvonne	film debut
1989	God's Will	unknown	
1994	Ladies in Waiting	Sarah	
1995	Lover's Knot	Gwen Myers	
2002	Fits and Starts	Bobbi	
2007	The Rat Thing	Barbara Jean	
2012	The Case of the Missing Garden Gnome	Francine	Short film

=== Television ===
Year	Title	Role	Notes
1986	Jack and Mike	Carol Green	television debut 2 episodes
1987	Night of Courage	Karen	Television Movie
1987	Fatal Confession: A Father Dowling Mystery	Theresa Robinson	Television Movie
1987-1988	Sable	Mike Blackman	recurring role; 7 episodes
1988	CBS Summer Playhouse	Margie Brandewynne	Episode: "Limited Partners"
1989	Doctor Doctor	Carolyn Marsh	recurring role; 3 episodes
1989	Trenchcoat in Paradise	Margie Moodus	Television Movie
1989-1990	Thirtysomething	Hollis Amato	recurring role; 5 episodes
1989-1992	Anything But Love	Robin Dulitski	series regular; 50 episodes
1991	Saturday's	Michelle	Television Movie
1992	Jack's Place	Michelle	Episode: "What's New?"
1993-1994	Cafe Americain	Lisa Hemmings	recurring role; 3 episodes
1994	Ellen (aka These Friends of Mine)	Holly Jamison (Season 1 only)	series regular; 13 episodes (2 episodes were held back and aired in 1996)
1995	Dweebs	Noreen	series regular; 7 episodes
1996	The John Larroquette Show	Penelope	2 episodes
1996	Touched by an Angel	Rosanne Fitzgerald-Moskowitz	Episode: "Written in Dust"
1997	Early Edition	Linda Newman	Episode: "The Jury"
1997	Grace Under Fire	Mrs. Landers	Episode: "Sam's Dad"
1999	Zenon: Girl of the 21st Century	Aunt Judy Kling	Television Movie
1999	Norm	Ellen	Episode: "Norm Pimps Wiener Dog"
2001	Zenon: The Zequel	Aunt Judy Kling	Television Movie
2001	CSI: Crime Scene Investigation	Linda Jasper	Episode: "You've Got Male"
2002	The Practice	Sally Burns	2 episodes
2003-2005	7th Heaven	Gwen Smith	recurring role; 3 episodes
2004	Dragnet	Mrs. Dowd	Episode: "Abduction"
2004	Zenon: Z3	Aunt Judy Kling-Plank	Television Movie
2004	NYPD Blue	Lainie Rutter	Episode: "Divorce, Detective Style"
2006	Long Lost Son	Marge	Television Movie
2006	Without a Trace	Karen Norton	Episode: "All for One"

=== Producer ===
Year	Title	Notes
2012	Speaking of Beauty TV	Television Series; Executive Producer
2015	The Hollywood Beauty Detective	Television Documentary; Producer

=== Director ===
Year	Title	Notes
2015	The Hollywood Beauty Detective	Television Documentary

=== Writer ===
Year	Title	Notes
2015	The Hollywood Beauty Detective	Television Documentary
