= Kirsten Storms =

American actress (born 1984)

- Born: April 8, 1984 (age 42); Orlando, Florida, U.S.
- Occupation: Actress
- Years active: 1996–present
- Spouse: Brandon Barash (m. 2013; div. 2016)
- Children: 1

Kirsten Storms (born April 8, 1984) is an American actress. Her roles include Zenon Kar in the Zenon film trilogy, Emily in the film Johnny Tsunami, and Bonnie Rockwaller in the television series Kim Possible. Storms played Isabella "Belle" Black on the NBC soap opera Days of Our Lives from 1999 to 2004, and from 2005 to 2026 she was Maxie Jones on the ABC soap opera General Hospital and its spin-off General Hospital: Night Shift.

== Early life and career ==
Storms was born in Florida. She is the daughter of CBS affiliate WCPX-TV (now WKMG-TV) sportscaster Mike Storms. According to Storms, she always knew she wanted to be a soap opera actress. At age five she announced:

"One of the first agents I got, I told, 'When I grow up, I'm going to be on a soap opera. You can get me commercials and stuff now, but what I really want to do someday is be on a soap opera.' [...] No one took me seriously. But I knew, even though I hadn't actually watched one, it was something I always wanted to do."

After visiting her father at work, Storms convinced her parents to enroll her in acting classes, leading to her discovery by a talent scout at the age of five. The talent scout suggested she be enrolled in an intensive children's acting camp in the Catskills, New York.

Storms' first role was a commercial for Galoob Baby Doll. After appearing in a handful of other commercials, her television career included a recurring role on ABC's Second Noah, plus a lead role in Sing Me a Story with Belle. At age twelve, she moved with her family to Los Angeles, California. Soon after that, she landed the recurring role of Laura Cummings on The WB's long-running program 7th Heaven. She appeared in three episodes between 1998 and 2001, in which she played a girlfriend of Simon (played by David Gallagher). She was later chosen to play the title character in Disney Channel's original movie Zenon: Girl of the 21st Century. The movie had the largest rating for any Disney Channel original movie at the time. She later reprised the role in two sequels. Storms continued to appear in a string of family shows and television movies, including The Trojan Horse, a Hallmark production. She also took a supporting role in Disney's Johnny Tsunami and voiced Bonnie Rockwaller in the Disney Channel animated series Kim Possible.

== Television ==
=== Days of Our Lives ===
I've known since I was 5 years old that I wanted to be an actress. I've wanted to work on a soap opera for a long time, and this is like all my dreams coming true at once. I know I'll want to try other things eventually, but I'm very happy working right here.

— Storms in 2000, on her role as Belle Black.

On August 5, 1999, Storms signed on to play Isabella "Belle" Black on the NBC daytime drama Days of Our Lives. Although she initially faced upset viewers at the sudden SORAS aging her casting brought to the character, Storms became popular with the viewers. Her five years on the soap opera featured her in high-profile storylines, such as the relationship with Shawn Brady, played by Jason Cook.

At the end of her five-year contract, Storms opted to not renew her contract with the series, one reason being her pilot had been picked up for the primetime show Clubhouse. Her final episode aired on July 16, 2004.

=== Clubhouse ===
Clubhouse was a primetime television series that aired on CBS starting the fall of 2004, created by Daniel Cerone and produced by Aaron Spelling. The series revolved around Pete Young (Jeremy Sumpter) and his dream of becoming a professional baseball player. Storms played Pete's sister, Betsy. Unlike the innocent character of Belle that Kirsten had just left, Betsy was a rebellious teenager often finding herself in trouble over such issues as sex, drugs, and alcohol. Storms embraced the new role, stating, "I can relate to a lot of things Betsy does. I've sat and talked with the executive producer about my first tattoo and the first time I ever had a drink of alcohol, things that she's going to be experiencing too." The show was canceled after only five episodes aired. A total of 11 episodes were shot and later aired on Trio as part of its Brilliant But Cancelled series.

=== General Hospital ===
Storms returned to familiar territory on May 23, 2005, becoming the third actress to portray Mariah Maximiliana "Maxie" Jones on the ABC soap opera General Hospital. In 2008, Storms was reunited with Jason Cook, who joined the soap as Matt Hunter. She received an Emmy nomination for her role in 2009.

Storms vacated the role in fall 2011 for medical reasons, later revealed to be endometriosis. She was temporarily replaced with Jen Lilley, and originally scheduled to return to work in February 2012. Her illness prevented her from returning on time, and Lilley was kept on for the foreseeable future. In July 2012, it was announced that Storms would return to the series. On September 5, 2012, Storms reprised the role of Maxie on-screen. Storms took maternity leave on January 2, 2014, and returned on April 8 of the same year.

In March 2017, Soap Opera Spy reported that Storms was leaving the show for "personal reasons". She returned to General Hospital in August 2017.

=== Other work ===
In 2015, Storms appeared as Selene Winterthorne in the soap opera web series Winterthorne.

== Personal life ==
In 2013 Storms was in a relationship with her former General Hospital co-star Brandon Barash. They secretly wed in June, and were expecting a child in January 2014. On January 7, 2014, Barash announced that Storms had given birth to a baby girl, Harper Rose Barash. In April 2016, Storms and Barash announced that they had filed for divorce after more than two-and-a-half years of marriage, citing irreconcilable differences, but they will raise their daughter together. As of 2025, she resides in Nashville, Tennessee.

Storms was pulled over on a Los Angeles freeway on September 7, 2007, by California Highway Patrol for tossing a lit cigarette out of the window of her Mercedes. She was arrested for a DUI following her failure at sobriety tests. Her blood alcohol content was measured at 0.13, above the California legal limit of 0.08. In November 2007, she pleaded no contest to the charges and was ordered to attend twelve Alcoholics Anonymous meetings, complete a 90-day alcohol education program, and pay $1,643 in fines. She also had her license suspended for six months and was placed on three years' probation. In 2026, Barash was granted an emergency restraining against Storms.

=== Health ===
Storms has been diagnosed with bipolar 1 disorder and frequent anxiety. She discussed her mental health challenges in a April 2022 episode of her General Hospital co-star Maurice Benard's podcast State of Mind where she explained that prior to her diagnosis, she experienced episodes of frenzy, fear, and stress in which she sought professional help through therapy and medication adjustments. This came after a trial period with antidepressants and boosters which exacerbated her symptoms. As a result, she took a leave of absence from General Hospital in 2018 to focus on her well-being, ultimately returning later that year. Since then, she had been an active advocate for mental health awareness, inspiring others to reduce stigma and to prioritize treatment and support systems.

In June 2021, Storms underwent a craniotomy to remove a large noncancerous cyst from her brain which split into two parts, which was responsible for her persistent symptoms like severe headaches, constant pressure, dizziness, and vertigo. She then managed her recovery with a medical follow-up and ultimately resumed work after a brief hiatus on General Hospital.

In October 2025, Storms announced that she had received a diagnosis of a brain aneurysm during a routine follow-up in January 2025 in which she underwent a major coiling procedure. As a result, this prompted another temporary absence from General Hospital in which she located to Nashville, Tennessee to be in a supportive environment.

== Filmography ==
Film
Year	Title	Role	Notes
1997	Crayola Kids Adventures: The Trojan Horse	Venus	Direct-to-video
1999	Zenon: Girl of the 21st Century	Zenon Kar	Television film
1999	Belle's Tales of Friendship	Kirsten	Direct-to-video
1999	Love Letters	Teenaged Melissa	Television film
1999	Johnny Tsunami	Emily	Television film
2001	Zenon: The Zequel	Zenon Kar	Television film
2001–05	Express Yourself	Herself	Interstitial series
2003	Kim Possible: A Sitch in Time	Bonnie Rockwaller (voice)	Television film
2004	Zenon: Z3	Zenon Kar	Television film
2005	Kim Possible: So the Drama	Bonnie Rockwaller (voice)	Television film
2011	Nice Guys Finish Last	Hot Girl	short

Television
Year	Title	Role	Notes
1996	Second Noah	Ashley	2 episodes
1998	You Wish	Betsy	Episode: "All in the Family Room"
1998	Any Day Now	Lydia	Episode: "It's Called Depression"
1998	7th Heaven	Laura Cummings	3 episodes
1999	Movie Stars	Mandy Silverman	Episode: "Like Father, Like Son"
1999	Sing Me a Story with Belle	Kirsten	2 episodes
2000	One World	Melanie	Episode: "Coming of Age"
1999–2004	Days of Our Lives	Belle Black	Series regular
2002–07	Kim Possible	Bonnie Rockwaller (voice)	39 episodes
2003	That's So Raven	Nicki	Episode: "The Parties"
2004–05	Clubhouse	Betsy Young	11 episodes
2005	CSI: Miami	Missy Marshall	Episode: "Cop Killer"
2005–2026	General Hospital	Maxie Jones	Series regular
2006	Skater Boys	Jessica Gordon	2 episodes
2007	General Hospital: Night Shift	Maxie Jones	5 episodes
2015	Winterthorne	Selene Winterthorne	Episode: "Part IV"

== Awards and nominations ==
List of acting awards and nominations
Year	Award	Category	Title	Result	Ref.
2000	Young Artist Awards	Best Performance in a TV Movie or Pilot: Leading Young Actress	Zenon: Girl of the 21st Century	Nominated	
2001	Young Artist Awards	Best Performance in a Daytime TV Series: Young Actress	Days of Our Lives	Nominated	
2001	Soap Opera Digest Awards	Outstanding Child Actor	Days of our Lives	Won	
2002	Young Artist Awards	Best Performance in a TV Drama Series: Leading Young Actress	Days of our Lives	Won	
2003	Soap Opera Digest Awards	Outstanding Younger Lead Actress	Days of our Lives	Nominated	
2005	Soap Opera Digest Awards	Favorite Triangle (shared with Charity Rahmer, Martha Madison, Kyle Brandt and Jason Cook)	Days of our Lives	Nominated	
2009	Daytime Emmy Awards	Outstanding Younger Actress in a Drama Series	General Hospital	Nominated	
