= Abandoned and Deceived =

- Written by: Joseph Dougherty
- Directed by: Joseph Dougherty
- Starring: Lori Loughlin; Brian Kerwin; Farrah Forke; Eric Lloyd; Bibi Besch; Rosemary Forsyth
- Composer: Laura Karpman
- Country of origin: United States
- Original language: English

Production
- Executive producers: Candace Farrell; Marilu Henner; Robert Lieberman
- Producers: Vahan Moosekian; Joseph Dougherty
- Cinematography: Thomas Del Ruth
- Editor: Alan L. Shefland
- Running time: 91 minutes
- Production companies: Crystal Beach Entertainment; TriStar Television

Original release
- Network: ABC
- Release: March 20, 1995

Abandoned and Deceived is a 1995 American drama film written and directed by Joseph Dougherty. The film stars Lori Loughlin, Brian Kerwin, Farrah Forke, Eric Lloyd, Bibi Besch and Rosemary Forsyth. The film premiered on ABC on March 20, 1995.

== Plot ==
The film is the story of a woman who is denied child support for her children by her ex-husband. Therefore she has to fight for her rights by appealing the courts of justice and the bureaucracy of the state, in the end helping other women do the same.

== Cast ==
- Lori Loughlin as Gerri Jensen
- Brian Kerwin as Doug
- Farrah Forke as Sarah
- Eric Lloyd as Matthew
- Bibi Besch as Iris
- Rosemary Forsyth as Judge
- Ilene Graff
- Robert Hooks as Dr. Peck
- Claudette Nevins
- Anthony Tyler Quinn as Gary
- Amy Steel as Suzie
- Tyler Cole Malinger
- Allison Dean
- Markus Flanagan
- Victoria Haas
- Herb Mitchell as Eddie
- Ben Siegler
- Patti Yasutake
- Gordon Clapp as Donald Quinn
- Linden Chiles as Gerri's Father
- Shaun Duke as Quinn's Supervisor
- Tory Fairbrother as Judith
- Connie Sawyer as Rose
