= Stepsister from Planet Weird =

- Film poster
- Based on: Stepsister from Planet Weird by Francess Lantz
- Written by: Chris Matheson
- Directed by: Steve Boyum
- Starring: Courtnee Draper; Tamara Hope; Lance Guest; Khrystyne Haje; Vanessa Lee Chester; Myles Jeffrey; Lauren Maltby
- Music by: Phil Marshall
- Country of origin: United States
- Original language: English

Production
- Producers: Ricka Kanter Fisher; Diana Kerew
- Cinematography: David Eggby
- Editor: Alan Cody
- Running time: 85 minutes

Original release
- Network: Disney Channel
- Release: June 17, 2000

Stepsister from Planet Weird is a 2000 American science fiction comedy film that was released as a Disney Channel Original Movie on June 17, 2000. Directed by Steve Boyum, it stars Courtnee Draper, Tamara Hope, Lance Guest, and Khrystyne Haje. The film is based on the book of the same name by Francess Lantz. The plot follows a teenage girl (Draper), who discovers that her mother's fiance (Guest) and her own future stepsister (Hope), are actually strange aliens from another planet hiding out on Earth.

== Plot ==
Megan Larson is an ordinary 14-year-old girl. Her workaholic father Fred and windsurfing mother Kathy are divorced, and Megan longs for them to get back together as much as she longs for her little brother Trevor to be less annoying. But the thing she wants the most is for popular boy Cutter Colburne to be her boyfriend, so her dearest wish is to be in with the popular group.

Things begin to get out of control when her mother meets Cosmo Cola, a nice but very strange man. He has a pretty and intelligent daughter named Ariel who is even weirder than her dad. Ariel hides under her father's car when the wind blows because she is afraid of wind, talks in a sophisticated manner, wears many layers to 'protect her essence' and cannot ride a bicycle, even with training wheels and a football helmet. Mostly she complains that she hates the town where they live and wants to return to her hometown in Yukon to be with her boyfriend Fanul. Worst of all for Megan, the kids at school think that the way Ariel behaves is 'cool and revolutionary'. Her teachers believe her mannerisms are poetic, and she even gets to sit at the popular table on her first day, which attracts Cutter's attention.

What Megan does not realize is that Ariel and her father are aliens from Planet Zircalon. Because Ariel's father was a freedom fighter on their home planet, they escaped to Earth, leaving behind their home, Ariel's mother who perished in the escape, and Ariel's boyfriend Fanul who is the son of the tyrannical emperor S'Vad. On her home planet, every citizen is a gaseous bubble that floats carelessly, so Ariel is very uncomfortable with the solid objects of Earth. She hates everything on Earth: her name, the way the wind blows, food, the solid objects and the people. "Every time I look at this horrid vehicle; the rubbery flesh, the flat face, the ghastly yellow hair that grows out of this hideous skull, I can only think I am grotesque."

Ariel and Megan become enemies despite Megan's mother's engagement to Ariel's father. As Ariel and Megan realize that they both want to break up their parents, they agree on a temporary alliance to achieve their common goal. However, none of their plans work out.

After a while, Megan begins to suspect something especially unusual is occurring and discovers that Ariel and Cosmo are aliens. Fanul and S'Vad arrive to take Ariel and Cosmo home to Zircalon, but Fanul turns on his father after Megan, Ariel, and Cutter convince him of the benefits of freedom. As Ariel's race is vulnerable to wind, she, Megan, Cutter, Fanul, and Trevor are able to defeat S'Vad with a leaf blower and hairdryers.

After S'Vad is defeated, Cosmo marries Kathy, Megan and Fanul develop feelings for each other while Ariel and Cutter do the same, and Ariel and Megan become best friends. Fanul plans to return home and take over as ruler after the death of his father, but also plans to make changes to the way things are run and to grant the people freedom. Fanul promises to return to Earth occasionally to visit Megan. Megan and Ariel realize that even though they are from different worlds they are a lot alike.

== Cast ==
- Courtnee Draper as Megan Larson, Kathy's daughter and Ariel's future stepsister
- Tamara Hope as Ariel Cola, Cosmo's daughter and Megan's future stepsister
- Lance Guest as Cosmo Cola, Kathy's fiancé and Ariel's father
- Khrystyne Haje as Kathy Larson, Megan's single mother and Cosmo's fiancée
- Vanessa Lee Chester as Michelle "Mikey", Megan's best friend
- Myles Jeffrey as Trevor Larson, Megan's annoying little brother and Ariel's future little stepbrother
- Lauren Maltby as Heather Hartman, a popular girl in Megan's school and Ariel's best friend
- Cecelia Specht as Serena Soo, Ariel and Cosmo's spiritualist neighbor
- Tiriel Mora as Fooop, S'Vad's doppelganger
- Henry Feagins as Fanul, Ariel's boyfriend, but later becomes Megan's eventual boyfriend
- Tiriel Mora as S'Vad, a tyrannical emperor of Planet Zircalon and main antagonist
- Tom Wright as Cutter Colburne, a popular boy whom Megan has a crush on
- Amy Lindsay as Becca (credited as Katie Campbell)

== Release ==
Stepsister from Planet Weird premiered on Disney Channel on June 17, 2000. It was made available to stream on Disney+.

== Reception ==
=== Critical response ===
Michael Speier of Variety commended Draper’s portrayal as the film’s most compelling element and suggested it could attract attention from casting directors seeking more substantial talent. While acknowledging the film’s goofy charm and light-hearted approach, they noted that it lacks sophisticated special effects, with modest music and unremarkable locations. Speier found the film effective in conveying themes of interplanetary camaraderie and praised the performances of Tamara Hope, Khrystyne Haje, and Lance Guest, despite some issues with American accents from local actors. Jessica Rawden of CinemaBlend observed that, among the various unconventional Disney Channel original movies, Stepsister from Planet Weird remains a personal favorite from 2000. Rawden remarked that the film’s primary focus on the conflict between the stepsisters contributes to its memorability, highlighting its exaggerated and imaginative storyline.

Sabienna Bowman of Bustle described the film as genuinely sweet and noted that it offers significantly more fun than one might expect. Bowman mentioned that while it is not frightening, it remains a valuable addition to any Halloween-themed Disney Channel original movie (DCOM) collection. Tom Cassidy of Common Sense Media gave the film a score of 4 out of 5 stars and said that Stepsister from Planet Weird is a heartfelt Disney TV movie that addresses complex themes such as divorce, the death of a parent, and blending families. Cassidy praised the movie for its effective exploration of these issues through the experiences of its likable leads, Megan and Ariel, noting that it teaches empathy and understanding while maintaining consistent humor. Cassidy also mentioned minor concerns, such as a potentially frightening ray-gun scene and mild language, but emphasized the film's overall warmth and responsible portrayal of adult-child relationships.

=== Impact ===
In 2017, CableTV.com analyzed the entire catalog of Disney Channel Original Movies (over 100 films) and utilized Google Trends data to determine the most popular DCOM in each state. In Pennsylvania, the most popular film identified was Stepsister from Planet Weird.
