= You're Invited to Mary-Kate & Ashley's =

1995–2000 film series

- The VHS cover for You're Invited to Mary-Kate & Ashley's Sleepover Party (1995)
- Genre: Musical; How-to; Party games
- Created by: Neil Steinberg
- Starring: Mary-Kate Olsen; Ashley Olsen
- Country of origin: United States
- Original language: English
- No. of episodes: 10

Production
- Running time: approx. 25 minutes (per episode)
- Production company: Dualstar Video

Original release
- Release: August 22, 1995 – July 18, 2000

You're Invited to Mary-Kate & Ashley's is a musical direct-to-video series starring Mary-Kate and Ashley Olsen. The videos were released between August 22, 1995 and July 18, 2000 and have since been released on VHS in 2000-2001 and on DVD in 2003.

The series began with You're Invited to Mary-Kate & Ashley's Sleepover Party and ended with You're Invited to Mary-Kate & Ashley's School Dance Party and three more compilation releases.

== List of releases ==
=== Original releases ===
==== You're Invited to Mary-Kate & Ashley's Sleepover Party (1995) ====
In You're Invited to Mary-Kate & Ashley's Sleepover Party, Mary-Kate, Ashley, and their slumber party guests dance around, tell scary stories, play video games, order a pizza, and try to pull an all-nighter.

Cast

- Mary-Kate and Ashley Olsen - Themselves
- Trent Olsen - Himself
- Cara DeLizia - Cara
- Brighton Hertford - Brighton
- Vanessa Croft - Vanessa
- Jimmy Higa - Boy #1
- Troy Davidson - Boy #2
- Note: This is the only episode to not include bloopers at the end.

Songs

- Dare to Dance
- Brother For Sale
- Video Monster
- Very, Very, Very Unbelievably Scary
- Gimme Pizza
- Pullin' An All Nighter

==== You're Invited to Mary-Kate & Ashley's Hawaiian Beach Party (1996) ====
In You're Invited to Mary-Kate & Ashley's Hawaiian Beach Party, the twins are tired from school and their busy lives so they decide to throw a beach party. They, along with their friends, travel to Hawaii in a submarine where they play in the water, build a sandcastle, and go surfing together.

Cast

- Mary-Kate and Ashley Olsen - Themselves
- Taylor Scheer - Cheryl
- Mariah Seneca - Nicole
- Venus Lee - Jenny

Songs

- We Need a Vacation
- Wild, Wet, Wacky, Wonderful World
- Sand, Sand, Glorious Sand
- I'd Rather be Surfing

==== You're Invited to Mary-Kate & Ashley's Birthday Party (1997) ====
In You're Invited to Mary-Kate & Ashley's Birthday Party, it is Mary-Kate and Ashley's birthday but the twins cannot decide what to do for their birthday party. After imagining party ideas such as a Moon Bounce party, pool party and piñata party, and a makeover party, they decide to take their friends to Six Flags.

Cast

- Mary-Kate and Ashley Olsen - Themselves
- Ashley Hicks - Jill
- Nicole Mancera - Lisa
- Bluejean Ashley Secrist - Belinda
- John Dultz - Eric
- Jesse Joseph Rambis - Jamie
- Ginger - Clue

Songs

- Moon Bounce Madness
- Pool Party
- Piñata Party
- Makeover Machine
- Scary Rides

==== You're Invited to Mary-Kate & Ashley's Christmas Party (1997) ====
In You're Invited to Mary-Kate & Ashley's Christmas Party, Mary-Kate and Ashley celebrate Christmas with a party. They bake cookies, sing Christmas songs, decorate the Christmas tree, reminisce over their ski vacation in Vail, Colorado, open presents, and get a few visits from Santa Claus.

Cast

- Mary-Kate and Ashley Olsen - Themselves
- Sara Paxton - Patty
- Christel Khalil - Diana
- Jessyca Gomer - Elizabeth
- Richard Taylor Olsen - Seth
- Bobby Edner - Chip
- Ginger - Clue
- Donovan Scott - Santa Claus

Songs

- Cookies
- Jingle Bells Rap
- Goin' Super Fast
- Giving is Getting
- We Wish You a Merry Christmas

==== You're Invited to Mary-Kate & Ashley's Mall Party (1997) ====
In You're Invited to Mary-Kate & Ashley's Mall Party, it is a rainy day and Mary-Kate and Ashley are bored. Luckily, their cousin invites them and their friends to go to the Mall of America with her. They fly a plane there where they go shopping, beat a few boys in mini golf club, eat in the food court, and join the boys in their concert.

Cast

- Mary-Kate and Ashley Olsen - Themselves
- Jamie Green - Jamie
- Jessica Bell - Jena
- Angelica Chitwood - Claire
- Graham Ballou - Nick
- Lance Bonner - Evan
- Michael Benoy - Band Member #1
- Amanda Gould - Band Member #2

Songs

- Meet You at the Mall
- Toys (When I Grow Up)
- Food Court
- Decisions, Decisions
- Instant Party

==== You're Invited to Mary-Kate & Ashley's Ballet Party (1997) ====
In You're Invited to Mary-Kate & Ashley's Ballet Party, the twins travel to New York City to have the perfect ballet party. They visit the New York State Theatre, meet a real ballerina with some magic who teaches them about ballet, travel around New York, and perform in a grand performance.

Cast

- Mary-Kate and Ashley Olsen - Themselves
- Eva Natanya - Danielle
- Amanda Edge - Jacqueline
- Sant'gria Bello - Eric
- Sarah Hay - Stephanie
- Sumaya Jackson - Dana

Songs

- Dancing Your Dreams
- Practice, Practice, Practice
- Sore Feet
- Butterflies in Your Stomach
- Tchaikovsky Medley

==== You're Invited to Mary-Kate & Ashley's Camp Out Party (1998) ====
In You're Invited to Mary-Kate & Ashley's Camp Out Party, Mary-Kate and Ashley take their friends out in the backyard for a camping trip. They set up camp, look around at nature, go fishing, and tell scary stories at night, and roast marshmallows and fish and eat pepperoni pizza.

Cast

- Mary-Kate and Ashley Olsen - Themselves
- Nanea Miyata - Katherine
- Paige Segal - Alexandra

Songs

- Just the Bare Necessities
- Come On
- Critters on My Crackers
- Raptor in the Woods

==== You're Invited to Mary-Kate & Ashley's Costume Party (1998) ====
In You're Invited to Mary-Kate & Ashley's Costume Party, Mary-Kate and Ashley look back at fashion over time in the 1950s, 1960s, 1970s, and 1980s before deciding on having a "come as you are" party (where attendees go to the party dressing in whatever they were wearing when they get the invite) with their friends.

Cast

- Mary-Kate and Ashley Olsen - Themselves
- Victoria Gregson - Emily
- Mimi Paley - Mia
- Zack Hopkins - Mark
- Niles Calloway - Zach
- Rafael Rojas III - Matt

Songs

- Ice Cream Crazy
- Goin' Through Our Mom's Stuff
- Honky Tonk Hip Hop
- Come As You Are

==== You're Invited to Mary-Kate & Ashley's Fashion Party (1999) ====
In You're Invited to Mary-Kate & Ashley's Fashion Party, the twins and their friends have a little fashion show before they are invited to visit a fashion college at the Fashion Institute of Design & Merchandising. They get to learn about fashion, design their own outfits, and even get to join in a real fashion show.

Cast

- Mary-Kate and Ashley Olsen - Themselves
- Joanna Flores - Madison
- Erin Mackey - Jenna
- Justin Taylor - Justin
- Adam Duro - Ryan
- Louis Lotorto - Mr. Richardson
- Becky Israel - Kiera

Songs

- I'm Still Me
- Fashion Jr. High
- We're Gonna Start Something New
- It's Not Me - It's You

==== You're Invited to Mary-Kate & Ashley's School Dance Party (2000) ====
In You're Invited to Mary-Kate and Ashley's School Dance Party, Mary-Kate and Ashley help set up for the school's dance, which is Spring Dance.com. Ashley worries if her boyfriend and her will be the King and Queen of Cyberspace while Mary-Kate struggles with trying to ask her crush out. Mary-Kate asks him and he says yes. Ashley loses Queen of Cyberspace to Kelly Benton while her boyfriend gets to be King but he reassures her that he still loves her the best.

Cast

- Mary-Kate and Ashley Olsen - Themselves
- Blake Bashoff - Jesse
- Chez Starbuck - Rick Morgan
- Shannon Chandler - Betsy
- Lauren Maltby - Erica
- Danielle Wiener - Brianna
- Note: School Dance Party VHS release also includes "Our Music Video", a collection of the twins' favorite music videos. This is also the only episode to not have the theme song.

Songs

- Monday Morning
- The Waiting Game
- Saturday Night
- Noise About Boys

=== Compilation releases ===
- You're Invited to Mary-Kate & Ashley's Greatest Parties (2000)

Includes Sleepover Party, Birthday Party, and Mall Party

- You're Invited to Mary-Kate & Ashley's Favorite Parties (2001)

Includes Fashion Party, Costume Party, and Camp Out Party

- You're Invited to Mary-Kate & Ashley's Vacation Parties (2001)

Includes Hawaiian Beach Party, Ballet Party, and Christmas Party

- Mary-Kate and Ashley's Christmas Collection (2001)

Includes Christmas Party, The Case of the Christmas Caper, and The Case of the Mystery Cruise
