= Dweebs (TV series) =

- Genre: Sitcom
- Created by: Peter Noah
- Written by: Peter Noah
- Directed by: Pamela Fryman; Andy Ackerman
- Starring: Farrah Forke; Peter Scolari; Stephen Tobolowsky; Corey Feldman; David Kaufman; Adam Biesk; Holly Fulger
- Composer: Mark Heyes
- Country of origin: United States
- Original language: English
- No. of seasons: 1
- No. of episodes: 10 (7 aired, 3 unaired)

Production
- Executive producer: Peter Noah
- Running time: 30 minutes
- Production companies: Peter Noah Productions; Warner Bros. Television

Original release
- Network: CBS
- Release: September 22 – November 3, 1995

Dweebs is an American sitcom that ran on CBS from September 22 to November 3, 1995. It failed to find an audience and was cancelled after 7 episodes, leaving 3 unaired.

== Synopsis ==
The show stars Farrah Forke as Carey, a technophobic woman hired to be the office manager of a highly successful software company named Cyberbyte, owned by Warren Mosbey (Peter Scolari). Warren and the other employees (played by actors Stephen Tobolowsky, David Kaufman, Corey Feldman, Nick Bellini and Adam Biesk), were stereotypical nerds or "dweebs", highly intelligent yet socially inept, contrasting with the character of Carey. Holly Fulger also co-starred as Carey's friend, Noreen.

== Air dates and cancellation ==
Ten episodes were produced but only seven aired in the US between 22 September and 3 November 1995. All 10 episodes aired the following year on Channel 4 in the UK from 29 June to 31 August 1996.

Farrah Forke was fresh off her role as Alex Lambert on Wings. She and Stephen Tobolowksy would both appear together again the following year as part of the main cast of the sitcom, Mr. Rhodes, which was co-created by Dweebs creator Peter Noah. It ran for almost twice as many episodes but would also be canceled after only one season.

== Reception and similarities to later shows ==
The show gained a mixed reception from critics at the time. Variety felt the show had a future if the kinks were worked out.

Back in 1995, a sitcom about social outcasts in the tech industry was an original idea, and would later be successfully used in shows like The IT Crowd, The Big Bang Theory, and Silicon Valley. An article in Vulture also compared the show to The Big Bang Theory and Silicon Valley and called it a trailblazer, saying that the show was "quite possibly the first American sitcom to focus its attention on the tech world and the integration of computers into daily life" and was "practically avant garde for its time", due to the fact that it "existed at a time when a substantial portion of America, but by no means a majority (or even close), was computer-savvy".

== Cast ==
- Farrah Forke as Carey
- Peter Scolari as Warren Mosbey
- Stephen Tobolowsky as Karl
- Corey Feldman as Vic
- David Kaufman as Morley
- Adam Biesk as Todd
- Holly Fulger as Noreen

== Episodes ==
No.	Title	Directed by	Written by	Original release date	Prod. code
1	"Pilot"	Andy Ackerman	Peter Noah	September 22, 1995	475311
Computer-illiterate Carey takes a job as an office manager at a high-tech computer company and quickly realizes that she's in over her head.
2	"The Privacy Show"	Pamela Fryman	Bruce Rasmussen	September 29, 1995	457801
Carey dates someone who leads the jealous Dweebs to break privacy protocol when they conduct a background check on him and, as she soon finds out, on her as well. They attend a meeting at Carey's apartment to discuss boundaries, feelings and social interaction.
3	"The Birthday Party Show"	Pamela Fryman	Eric Cohen	October 6, 1995	457802
Carey invites her reluctant coworkers to her birthday party where they eventually break out of their party shells.
4	"The Cyrano Show"	Pamela Fryman	Bill Barol	October 13, 1995	457803
Warren is contacted by a woman through instant messaging and Carey responds for him in a flirtation manner. However, not everything is as it seems. Karl is selected for a NASA software mission into space.
5	"The Bad Back Show"	Pamela Fryman	Sydnie Suskind	October 20, 1995	457804
When Carey throws out her back and can't leave her apartment, Todd is made the temporary office manager, but he proves to be ill-equipped for the job.
6	"The Crush Show"	Pamela Fryman	Bruce Rasmussen	October 27, 1995	457805
Vic's jealousy gets the best of him after his negative actions towards Carey's boyfriend gets him in trouble. Warren suddenly becomes aggressive against a pushy contractor.
7	"The Noreen Sleeps with Warren Show"	Pamela Fryman	Sydnie Suskind	November 3, 1995	457806
Warren is going to a film screening of a movie they did computer generated special effects for and he needs a date. Carey can't go so she asks Noreen if she wants to and does. And the next day she tells Carey that she and Warren spent the night together and can't help brag about his prowess in bed. Which makes Carey look at Warren a little differently.
8	"The Karl's Crisis Show"	Pamela Fryman	Eric Cohen	Unaired	457807
Karl gets upset when his coworkers repeatedly harass him about his age.
9	"The Bad P.R. Show"	Pamela Fryman	Bill Barol	Unaired	457808
An off-the-cuff comment about software bugs leads to an overblown press scandal, so the company hires a public relations manager (special guest Wendie Malick).
10	"The Actress Show"	Pamela Fryman	Peter Noah	Unaired	457809
The gang swoon over an actress whom they hire to star in a new CD-ROM game.
