= Stuart Pankin =

American actor (born 1946)

- Born: April 8, 1946 (age 80); Philadelphia, Pennsylvania, U.S.
- Education: Columbia University
- Occupation: Actor
- Years active: 1968–present
- Spouse: Joy Pankin (m. 1974)
- Children: 1

Stuart Pankin (born April 8, 1946) is an American actor. He is known for his role as anchor Bob Charles in Not Necessarily the News and as the voice of Earl Sinclair in Dinosaurs. Pankin is also known for his portrayals of Commander Edward Plank in the Zenon trilogy of films and Orthodox Jew Ben Heineman in Curb Your Enthusiasm, as well as making many guest appearances in many television shows and for lending his voice to various animated shows and films. Among his approximately three dozen films was Hollywood Knights. He also appeared as Gordon Szalinski in Honey, We Shrunk Ourselves, Sheriff Lloyd Parsons in Arachnophobia, and Jimmy in Fatal Attraction.

== Early life and education ==
Pankin was born in Philadelphia, Pennsylvania, on April 8, 1946. He attended Dickinson College, where he was a member of Sigma Alpha Epsilon, and Columbia University.

== Career ==
Pankin has performed at St. Vincent Summer Theatre. Pankin portrayed anchor Bob Charles on HBO's Not Necessarily the News, and voiced Earl Sinclair in the family sitcom Dinosaurs. He also played the father Mike Dooley on the sitcom Nearly Departed. Pankin also played an Orthodox Jew in Curb Your Enthusiasm.

One of Pankin's earliest film appearances was as asthmatic musician/magician Dudley Laywicker in Hollywood Knights. Among his approximately three dozen film appearances, he starred in Zenon: Girl of the 21st Century, Zenon: The Zequel, and Zenon: Z3 as Commander Plank. He also appeared in Honey, We Shrunk Ourselves, as the brother of Wayne Szalinski, and also co-starred as a bossy, self-important lawman in the horror/comedy Arachnophobia. Pankin also appeared as an absent-minded professor in a series of edutainment 3D films (Encounter in the Third Dimension and Misadventures in 3D), designed for large-screen IMAX theaters. Pankin also appeared on Ken Reid's TV Guidance Counselor Podcast on January 24, 2017.

== Personal life ==
Pankin has been married to actress Joy Pankin since 1974; together they have a son, Andy.

== Filmography ==
=== Film ===
Year	Title	Role	Notes
1976	Next Stop, Greenwich Village	Man at Party	
1979	Scavenger Hunt	Duane	
1980	The Hollywood Knights	Dudley Laywicker	
1980	Hangar 18	Sam Tate	
1981	Earthbound	Sweeney	
1981	An Eye for an Eye	Nicky LaBelle	
1984	Irreconcilable Differences	Ronnie	
1985	The Dirt Bike Kid	Mr. Hodgkins	
1987	Fatal Attraction	Jimmy	
1988	Love at Stake	Judge Samuel John	
1989	Second Sight	Dr. Preston Pickett	
1990	Arachnophobia	Sheriff Lloyd Parsons	
1991	Mannequin Two: On the Move	Mr. James	
1991	Life Stinks	Pritchard	
1994	The Silence of the Hams	Pete Putrid	
1994	Squanto: A Warrior's Tale	Brother Timothy	
1994	I Love Trouble	Society Photographer	
1994	Beanstalk	The Giant	Direct-to-video
1995	Congo	Boyd	
1996	Big Bully	Gerry	
1996	Napoleon	Perenti Lizard, Father Penguin	Voice
1996	Striptease	Alan Mordecai	
1997	Honey, We Shrunk Ourselves	Gordon Szalinski	Direct-to-video
1999	Encounter in the Third Dimension	The Professor, M.A.X.	Voice
1999	Baby Huey's Great Easter Adventure	Empire	Direct-to-video
2000	Aladdin and the Adventures of All Time	King Henry VIII	Voice, direct-to-video
2001	D4G	Stuart Dofman	
2002	Now You Know	Mr. Victim	
2003	Misadventures in 3D	The Professor, M.A.X.	Short film
2007	An Accidental Christmas	Saul	
2008	A Woman in the West	Dr. Sedgewick	Short film
2008	Public Interest	Charles Waterford	
2009	Dude, Where's My Bar?	Moe Green	Short film
2011	Hopelessly In June	Francaise Flowers	
2011	The Artist	Director #1	
2014	Conjuring Orson	Eli Klein	Short film
2014	Fat Zombie	Dr. Alastair Kruger	Short film
2015	The Binding	Dr. Plank	
2017	I Might Be Famous	Pat Wonders	
2017	Anywhere, U.S.A.	Frank Hanson	Short film
2019	American Christmas	Jim	
2021	The Great Family	Mikeman Mike	Short film
2022	Our Almost Completely True Story	Buster	
2024	Bus Stops	Rabbi	Short film
TBA	Kickback, V	Councilman Bottom	Pre-production

=== Television ===
Year	Title	Role	Notes
1974	Free to Be... You & Me	Man in the maternity ward	Television film
1977	The San Pedro Bums	Stuf	Television film
1977	The San Pedro Beach Bums	Stuf	10 episodes
1978–1980	Barney Miller	Alex Fleischer, Anthony Moreau	2 episodes
1979–1980	B.J. and the Bear	Harvey Krepler, Mushroom	2 episodes
1981	House Calls	Huggins	Episode: "Bombing Out"
1981	CHiPs	Louis	Episode: "Ponch's Angels"
1981	Benson	The Plumber	Episode: "Stress"
1982	No Soap, Radio	Tuttle	5 episodes
1982	Strike Force	Unknown role	Episode: "Deadly Chemicals"
1982	The Powers of Matthew Star	Bill Chambers	Episode: "The Accused"
1982–1984	Matt Houston	Farley Ward, Minister	2 episodes
1982–1985	Trapper John, M.D.	August Havermeyer	3 episodes
1983–1990	Not Necessarily the News	Bob Charles	46 episodes
1984–1987	Mickey Spillane's Mike Hammer	Counterfeiter, Labbo	2 episodes
1985	Fame	Harry Burke	Episode: "Wishes"
1985	Three's a Crowd	Alex Cummings	Episode: "A Star Is Born"
1985	It's a Living	Jerry Wilson	Episode: "I Write the Songs"
1985	Scarecrow and Mrs. King	Teller in red jacket	Episode: "Sour Grapes"
1985–1991	Night Court	Mr. Shoope, Dr. Adelman, Dr. Charles Melnick	3 episodes
1986–1991	The $100,000 Pyramid	Himself	45 episodes
1986	The Golden Girls	Jacques De Courville	Episode: "Vacation"
1986	Bamboozle	Himself	
1987	Family Ties	Marv	Episode: "The Visit"
1987	The New Hollywood Squares	Himself	3 episodes
1987	Second Chance	Teacher	1 episode
1987–1988	Super Password	Himself	20 episodes
1988–1989	Hooperman	The Devil, Clyde	2 episodes
1988	Who's the Baby	Himself	Television film
1988	The 9th Annual CableACE Awards	Himself	
1988	The 2nd Annual American Comedy Awards	Himself	
1989	Nearly Departed	Mike Dooley	6 episodes
1989	Who's the Boss?	Doug Shaffer	Episode: "It's Somebody's Birthday"
1989–1990	Falcon Crest	Jace Sampson	8 episodes
1989–1990	It's Garry Shandling's Show	Lucas Death, Garry's Brain	2 episodes
1990	Stingray	Morgan	Episode: "That Terrible Swift Sword"
1991–1994	Dinosaurs	Earl Sinclair	Voice, 65 episodes
1991	Knots Landing	Benny Appleman	9 episodes
1991	Charlie Hoover	Ed	Episode: "Roll One for Ed"
1991	Shannon's Deal	Ted McCarthy	Episode: "First Amendment"
1991	The Chuck Woolery Show	Himself	1 episode
1992	Whoops!	Santa Claus	Episode: "Say It Ain't So, Santa"
1993	The Commish	Mike Amador	Episode: "The Set-Up"
1993	Family Matters	Honest Bob	Episode: "Car Wars"
1993	Bonkers	Mammoth Mammoth, Pops Klock	Voice, 2 episodes
1993	Class of '96	Barry	Episode: "Parents Weekend"
1994	Father and Scout	Aaron	Television film
1994	Batman: The Animated Series	Condiment King	Voice, episode: "Make 'Em Laugh"
1994	Adventures in Wonderland	Scalawag Jones	Episode: "The Color of Wobucks"
1994	Aladdin	Sultan Pasta Al-Dente	Voice, 3 episodes
1995	Sisters	Junior	Episode: "A Lullaby to My Father"
1995	Down, Out & Dangerous	Calvin Burrows	Television film
1995	University Hospital	Arnie Nicholson	Episode: "Dark Side of the Moon"
1996	Bone Chillers	Mr. Batrachian	Episode: "Teacher Creature"
1996	Deadly Games	Dr. Jerry Abernathy	Episode: "Dr. Kramer"
1996	Duckman	Additional voices	Episode: "Apocalypse Not"
1996	The Mask: Animated Series	Buzz Stingman / Stinger	Voice, 2 episodes
1996	Quack Pack	Green I Monster of Jealousy	Voice, episode: "Snow Place to Hide"
1996–1997	Nick Freno: Licensed Teacher	Kurt Fust	22 episodes
1996–1997	Life with Louie	Flanngan	Voice, 2 episodes
1997	Cow and Chicken	Chicken Walla, Mailman, Sergeant	Voice, episode: "Cow Instincts, Don't It?"
1997	The Angry Beavers	Destructo, Mailman	Voice, 2 episodes
1997	Aaahh!!! Real Monsters	Clancy, News Anchor	Voice, episode: "The Great Escape"
1998	Ally McBeal	Mr. Handy	Episode: "They Eat Horses, Don't They?"
1998	Like Father, Like Santa	Snipes	Television film
1998	Animaniacs	Ed	Voice, episode: "The Carpool"
1998	Babylon 5: The River of Souls	James Riley	Television film
1998	Oh Yeah! Cartoons	Possum	Voice, episode: "Apex Cartoon Props & Novelties"
1998–1999	Hercules	Cyclops	3 episodes
1998–2001	Dharma & Greg	Mr. Gottlieb, Rabbi Mutchnik	3 episodes
1999–2001	For Your Love	Mr. Gerard	5 episodes
1999	Suddenly Susan	Andy Bevins	Episode: "Wedding Bell Blues"
1999	The Brothers Flub	Additional voices	16 episodes
1999	Batman Beyond	Key Negotiator	Voice, episode: "Meltdown"
1999	Superman: The Animated Series	Dr. Cardy	Voice, episode: "A Fish Story"
1999	Uncle Gus in: For the Love of Monkeys	Uncle Gus	Voice, TV short
1999	Mad About You	Mr. Brodsky	Episode: "Uncle Phil Goes Back to High School"
1999	Walker, Texas Ranger	Stanley Chamberlain	Episode: "Tall Cotton"
1999	Zenon: Girl of the 21st Century	Commander Edward Plank	Television film
2000	Phase 4	Himself	Television film
2000	Action	Bill Rothstein	Episode: "The Last Ride of the Elephant Princess"
2001	Malcolm in the Middle	Doctor	Episode: "Flashback"
2001	Godzilla: The Series	Milo Sanders	Voice, episode: "Tourist Trap"
2001	Chasing Destiny	Mike Ditlow	Television film
2001	The Zeta Project	Dr. Donald Tannor	Voice, 2 episodes
2001	The Hughleys	Santa	Episode: "I'm Dreaming of a Slight Christmas"
2001	Zenon: The Zequel	Commander Edward Plank	Television film
2002	Teamo Supremo	Joseph Garbaggio / Sloppy Joe	Voice, episode: "The Sinister Sloppy Joe!"
2002	As Told by Ginger	Mr. Bowers, Math Teacher	Voice, episode: "New Girl in Town"
2003–2004	That's So Raven	Mr. Grozowtski	3 episodes
2004	Higglytown Heroes	Bus Driver Hero	Voice, episode: "Catch Up with Ketchup"
2004	Walk Fit	Himself	Television film
2004	Miss Cast Away and the Island Girls	Noah	Television film
2004	Zenon: Z3	Commander Edward Plank	Television film
2005	Lilo & Stitch: The Series	Additional voices	Episode: "Sample"
2005	Curb Your Enthusiasm	Ben Heineman	2 episodes
2005	I Love the 80's 3-D	Himself	Documentary
2006	Boston Legal	Judge Gilbert Potts	Episode: "Tick or Treat"
2006	Wagtail	Himself	
2007	On the Lot	Himself	Unknown episodes
2007	State of Mind	Dr. Shapiro	Episode: "Snow Melts"
2008	The Suite Life on Deck	Simms	Episode: Parrot Island"
2009	Splatter	Dr. Bellows	Episode: "Where There's a Will"
2011	Shake It Up!	Santa	Episode: "Jingle It Up"
2012	A Christmas Wedding Date	Santa Sam	Television film
2012	Desperate Housewives	Patrick	Episode: "You Take for Granted"
2013	All I Want for Christmas	Lewis	Television film
2014	Q N' A with Mikki and Shay	Himself	1 episode
2015	Girl Meets World	Principal Yancy	Episode: "Girl Meets the New Teacher"
2015	The Biz	Saul	TV short
2015	You'll Be Fine	Dave	Episode: "We've Been Waiting"
2016	Underachievers	Principal Hartley	TV short
2018	See Ya	Morris	Episode: "3 F's"
2021	Pilot Season	Ron	Episode: "Behind the Times"

=== Video games ===
Year	Title	Role
1999	Lands of Lore III	Finch Josiah, The Noble

=== Radio ===
Year	Title	Role	Notes
2017	Ken Reid's TV Guidance Counselor Podcast	Himself / Guest	

=== Web ===
Year	Title	Role	Notes
2016	Kevin Pollak's Chat Show	Himself / Guest	Episode: "257"

== Theatre ==
Year	Title	Role	Noted
1968	The War of the Roses	—N/a	
1971	Mary Stuart	Sheriff of Northampton	Broadway
1972	Narrow Road to the Deep North	One of the Peasants, Soldiers, Tribesmen	Broadway
1972	Twelfth Night	Priest	Broadway
1972	The Crucible	Hopkins	Broadway
1975	The Glorious Age	Performer	Off-Broadway

== Awards and nominations ==
Awards and nominations
Year	Award	Category	Title	Result
1983	CableACE Awards	Best Actor in a Variety Program	Not Necessarily The News	Nominated
1987	CableACE Awards	Best Actor in a Comedy or Music Program	Not Necessarily The News	Nominated
1988	CableACE Awards	Best Actor in a Comedy Series	Not Necessarily The News	Won
1989	CableACE Awards	Best Actor in a Comedy Series	Not Necessarily The News	Nominated
2006	ERA Awards	Best Celebrity Presenter	Electronic Retail Association	Nominated
