= Ground Control (film) =

1998 film by Richard Howard

- DVD cover art
- Directed by: Richard Howard
- Screenplay by: Mark Shepherd; Robert Moreland
- Story by: Talaat Captan; Robert Moreland
- Produced by: Peter Block; Talaat Captan; Daryl De Quetteville; Vince Ravine
- Starring: Kiefer Sutherland; Bruce McGill; Kristy Swanson; Robert Sean Leonard; Kelly McGillis
- Cinematography: Gene Young
- Edited by: Edward R. Abroms
- Music by: Randy Miller
- Production companies: Green Communications; Hard Work Productions
- Distributed by: Trimark
- Release dates: August 26, 1998 (Italy); March 27, 1999 (US)
- Running time: 93 minutes
- Country: United States
- Language: English

Ground Control (Jet) is a 1998 American disaster thriller film directed by Richard Howard and starring Kiefer Sutherland, Bruce McGill, Kristy Swanson, Kelly McGillis, and Robert Sean Leonard. The film also features a cameo by former baseball player Steve Sax in the role of an airline co-pilot.

== Plot ==
Chicago air traffic controller Jack Harris (Kiefer Sutherland) was cleared of liability for an ill-fated flight under his authority which resulted in the loss of Transair flight 290, a Lockheed L-1011 with all 174 souls aboard. He subsequently left the job and went on to design air control software, until five years later when T.C. Bryant (Bruce McGill), his ex-colleague who had since transferred to Phoenix, pleads for help on New Year's Eve, due to a critical staff shortage and with torrential weather predicted.

Jack's return to the control room is met with both warmth and disdain, particularly when he experiences flashbacks of the crash. The atmosphere rapidly becomes much more serious as the storm approaches and, with the control tower suffering power cuts, the team is forced into manually directing busy air traffic through severe turbulence.

== Cast ==
- Kiefer Sutherland as Jack Harris
- Bruce McGill as T.C. Bryant
- Kristy Swanson as Julie Albrecht
- Robert Sean Leonard as Cruise
- Kelly McGillis as Susan Stratton
- Margaret Cho as Amanda
- Charles Fleischer as Randy
- Henry Winkler as John Quinn
- Farrah Forke as Laura Franklin
- Michael Gross as Murray
- Jack Plotnick as Curtis
- Brian George as Shamaal
- John Bennett Perry as Senator Rutherford
- Eleanor Mondale as Christine
- Alex Wexo as Flight 393 Pilot
- John Nielsen as "Pissed Off" Pilot
- Drew Snyder as David, Pilot, Flight 47
- Steve Sax as Co-pilot, Flight 47
- Ruben Paul as Sam
- Vito D'Ambrosio as Weather Analyst

== Production ==
The primary cast of Kiefer Sutherland, Kelly McGillis and Robert Sean Leonard was announced in late 1997. Filming had begun at LAX, but after shooting permits were rescinded, producer Talaat Captan finished the film using locations at Ontario International Airport in San Bernardino County, California.

== Release ==
Ground Control had its theatrical premiere on August 26, 1998 in Italy as Rischio d'impatto, followed by video releases in 1999 in the United States as Jet and in Iceland as Lennonjohto, and in 2000 as Kollisionskurs - Panik im Tower in Germany and Ground Control in Spain. It had its United Kingdom television premiere as Ground Control in December 2003 on PAX, and in the United States in December 2005.

== Critical response ==
Nathan Rabin of The A.V. Club compared Ground Control unfavorably to a similar film, Pushing Tin, calling it "easily the second-best film about air-traffic controllers to be released over the past few months", but added that the film was a "competent, unremarkable disaster movie." He noted that the film's characters were "one-dimensional" and that the dialogue was bland and the plot predictable, but that the film was "nevertheless effective".

The Movie Scene made reference to Kiefer Sutherland's role in the television series 24, writing that "even Jack Bauer couldn't rescue this". They noted that the film suffered from a tight budget, with limited locations and scenery that were "unbelievably fake", and that the film's use of quick cut-aways made the storyline seem disjointed. They suggested, however, that once viewers got past those deficits, the use of poor sets was "actually quite amusing" and added to the film's "quirky charm". The reviewer was surprised that the "quite impressive names" that made up the cast list were relegated mostly to minor roles and that the film spent "all its time focusing on Kiefer Sutherland". The greatest problems of the film were seen in its weak plot and poor dialogue, but this could have been averted had the supporting characters been given more depth. Apart from Sutherland, the only major name in the film who managed to make any impact was Henry Winkler in his role as airport engineer John Quinn. The reviewer concluded that, despite the film's obvious problems and predictability, it had a "certain amount of low budget charm," and that "even the cheesiness of the plot and fake special effects doesn't totally spoil this film and at times it makes it even more enjoyable."

Finnish newspaper Kaleva remarked that the stress and operations of air traffic ground control were a perfect backdrop for a drama film.

TV Guide wrote that the film's characterizations were "strait-laced and noble" and that the film "could have been commissioned by the Air Traffic Controllers' Benevolent Association." They made note of the film's story and plotline being derivative, its "threadbare production values" and "artless" special effects, and its use of "stock characters", but admitted that, despite those weaknesses, the film "does manage to whip up a little suspense".
