= Nurses on the Line: The Crash of Flight 7 =

- Also known as: Nurses on the Line: The Crash of Flight 7 Race Against the Dark
- Genre: Adventure; Drama
- Written by: Andrew Laskos; Norman Morrill
- Directed by: Larry Shaw
- Starring: Lindsay Wagner; Robert Loggia; Jennifer Lopez; David Clennon; Farrah Forke; Paula Marshall
- Theme music composer: Curt Sobel
- Country of origin: United States
- Original language: English

Production
- Executive producers: John Cosgrove; Terry Dunn Meurer; Carrie Stein
- Producers: John Perrin Flynn; Lorenzo O'Brien
- Production locations: Catemaco, Veracruz, Mexico; Los Angeles
- Cinematography: Robert Primes
- Editor: Scott Vickrey
- Running time: 87 min.
- Production companies: Cosgrove/Meurer Productions; World International Network

Original release
- Network: CBS
- Release: November 23, 1993

Nurses on the Line: The Crash of Flight 7 (also known as Lost in the Wild and Race Against the Dark) is a 1993 American made-for-television drama film starring Lindsay Wagner and Robert Loggia. This was Jennifer Lopez's film debut. It was aired on CBS on November 23, 1993. It is set in Catemaco, Veracruz, Mexico.

== Plot ==
A couple of student nurses decide to join some doctors to work in a medical station in the rain-forest a few hours flying-time from the Mexican town Catemaco. As they fly from Catemaco towards the clinic (which actually consists of just a few huts and almost no equipment) one of their three planes goes down because of engine malfunction. It crashes somewhere in the middle of the jungle causing bad injuries to the passengers. The following day describes the attempts by the passengers to save their own lives in spite of the few poor chances they seem to have. There is almost no medicine available, the supplies they brought with them were all on the plane going down and were stolen by native drug-dealers when they arrived at the site of the crash first. In the afternoon they decide to take the injured to a nearby village with a runway long enough that the Learjet of the Californian Air Rescue team could take them to a clinic in the U.S. Not only is the journey there very complicated (one of the injured could pass away any minute) but it may also be futile: due to recent anti-drug operations no plane is allowed to fly after dark, so the Air Rescue Team is not able to get clearance for their mission. Dr. Daniel Perrin sets off to Catamaco to persuade the authorities into giving their permission for the flight while the rest is trying to get to the runway by dawn.

== Cast ==
- Lindsay Wagner as Elizabeth Hahn
- Robert Loggia as Dr. Daniel Perrin
- Jennifer Lopez as Rosie Romero
- David Clennon as Dr. Rulon Beesley
- Farrah Forke as Fran Markoe
- Paula Marshall as Jill Houston
- Hilary Edson as Danae Hahn
- Tom Irwin as Eddie
- Joan McMurtrey as Lianne
- Pedro Armendáriz Jr. as Commandante
- Sergio Calderón as José
- James Sutorius as Pilot
- Gary Frank as Len
- Bill Bolender as Chris O'Neill
- David Villalpando as Luis
