= Zenon: Girl of the 21st Century (film) =

1999 American television film

- VHS cover
- Based on: Zenon: Girl of the 21st Century by Marilyn Sadler & Roger Bollen
- Written by: Stu Krieger
- Directed by: Kenneth Johnson
- Starring: Kirsten Storms; Raven-Symoné; Stuart Pankin; Holly Fulger; Frederick Coffin; Gregory Smith
- Theme music composer: Sabelle Breer; Phil Marshall; Kristian Rex
- Country of origin: United States
- Original language: English

Production
- Producer: Thom Colwell
- Cinematography: Ron Orieux
- Editor: Terry Stokes
- Running time: 97 minutes
- Production company: de Passe Entertainment

Original release
- Network: Disney Channel
- Release: January 23, 1999

Related
- Zenon: The Zequel; Zenon: Z3

Zenon: Girl of the 21st Century is a 1999 American science fiction comedy film directed by Kenneth Johnson and starring Kirsten Storms as the eponymous heroine. The film premiered on Disney Channel on January 23, 1999. The film was based on the book Zenon: Girl of the 21st Century written by Marilyn Sadler and Roger Bollen. The film was originally conceived as a pilot for a potential television series. The film was the first under the Disney Channel Original Movie banner to produce a sequel, Zenon: The Zequel (2001). A third and final installment was also produced, Zenon: Z3 (2004).

== Plot ==
The year is 2049 and Zenon Kar is a 13-year-old girl who lives with her family on an Earth-orbiting space station. After Zenon gets into trouble with the space station's commander, Edward Plank, her parents punish her by sending her to Earth to live with her Aunt Judy. On Earth, Zenon experiences trouble fitting in with other kids, who consider her name, space-station stories and slang to be weird. Likewise, Zenon considers the children at her school woefully out of touch with pop culture. Eventually, Zenon makes friends on Earth with two boys, Andrew and Greg (with whom she develops a relationship). Along the way, the kids learn to be more accepting of one another and to look past first impressions.

During her time on Earth, Zenon uncovers a plot masterminded by station bigwig Parker Wyndham to use a computer virus to crash the space station and collect the insurance money. When Zenon tries to warn her parents of the danger, Commander Plank, who sees all children as troublemakers, convinces Zenon's parents not to listen to her. Plank believes that her story is only a ploy to get back onto the space station to attend an upcoming concert by her idol Proto Zoa and his pop-rock group Microbe.

Andrew and Greg join in to help Zenon find a way to save the people on the space station. Andrew creates a computer antivirus, but Zenon must get Andrew's disk to the space station. Zenon goes to the launch yard, hoping to sneak onto a rocket to the space station. Proto Zoa, who is about to depart for the concert, recognizes Zenon from a "Dance with Proto Zoa" contest, has her join him on the launch to the station. Wyndham and Lutz enter the rocket to try to stop Zenon, and Aunt Judy follows them. Upon arrival, Commander Plank is shocked to see Zenon, but lets her stay when he becomes smitten with Aunt Judy. Plank still won't believe Zenon's story, especially when Wyndham accuses her of trying to sabotage the station. Zenon manages to load Andrew's antivirus program on the station's computers in time. Wyndham is arrested with his assistant Lutz while everyone else enjoys the Microbe concert.

== Cast ==
- Kirsten Storms as Zenon Kar
- Raven-Symoné as Nebula Wade, Zenon's friend
- Stuart Pankin as Commander Edward Plank
- Holly Fulger as Judy Kling, Zenon's aunt
- Frederick Coffin as Parker Wyndham
- Gregory Smith as Greg, Zenon's love interest
- Bob Bancroft as Mr. Lutz, Wyndham's assistant
- Greg Thirloway as Mark Kar, Zenon's father
- Phillip Rhys as Proto Zoa, Zenon's idol
- Gwynyth Walsh as Astrid Kar, Zenon's mother
- Lauren Maltby as Margie Hammond, Zenon's rival
- Danielle Fraser as Lynx
- Brenden Richard Jefferson as Andrew, Greg's friend
- Blair Slater as Aquillat
- Zach Lipovsky as Matt
- Neil Denis as Leo
- Kea Wong as Gemma
- David Meyer as Proto Zoa's Groupie

== Production ==
Zenon: Girl of the 21st Century was a failed pilot for a proposed television series. It was directed by Kenneth Johnson. The film was produced by de Passe Entertainment for Disney Channel, and executive produced by Suzanne de Passe and Suzanne Coston.

Filming began in August 1998, in Vancouver, British Columbia. The rocket launch yard scenes were filmed at the Plaza of Nations.

== Release ==
Zenon was originally slated to air on Disney Channel in December 1998, but ultimately premiered on January 23, 1999. Walt Disney Home Video released it on VHS in September 2000.

The film is available on iTunes, Google Play, and Disney+.

The special edition version on VHS has a bonus feature of Disney's Travelers.

== Sequels ==
The film was followed by Zenon: The Zequel (2001) and Zenon: Z3 (2004).

== See also ==
- List of American films of 1999
- List of films featuring space stations
