= Lauren Maltby =

American actress and psychologist (born 1984)

- Born: Lauren Elizabeth Maltby; November 17, 1984 (age 41); San Diego, California, United States
- Occupations: Actress, psychologist
- Years active: 1997–2004
- Website: laurenmaltby.com

Lauren Elizabeth Maltby (born November 17, 1984) is an American retired actress and psychologist. She is best known for her roles as Margie Hammond in the Zenon trilogy movies and Heather Hartman in Stepsister from Planet Weird.

== Biography ==
Maltby was born in San Diego, California. She has an older sister, Jessica. She is an alumna of Whittier Christian High School where she ran cross country. In the Olympic League cross country finals held on November 2, 2000, she placed 28th with a time of 25:49.15. She attended Biola University for a Ph.D. in clinical psychology, with her research focusing on ambivalent sexism.

After the final Zenon movie, Zenon: Z3, Lauren Maltby retired from acting.

== Filmography ==
=== Film ===
Year	Title	Role
1997	Sisters and Other Strangers	Gail, age 12
1998	I'll Be Home for Christmas	Tracey Wilkinson
1999	Zenon: Girl of the 21st Century	Margie Hammond
2000	Stepsister from Planet Weird	Heather Hartman
2000	You're Invited to Mary-Kate and Ashley's School Dance Party	Erica
2001	Zenon: The Zequel	Margie Hammond
2001	The Princess Diaries	Beach Student in Blue Dress (Cameo)
2004	Zenon: Z3	Margie Hammond

=== Television ===
Year	Title	Role	Notes
1998–2001	Movie Surfers	Herself	
2000	One World	Becky	"Crushed" (season 3, episode 6)
2000	You're Invited to Mary-Kate & Ashley's...	Herself	TV special
2002	The Proud Family	Samantha (voice)	"I Had A Dream" (season 1, episode 14)
