= Searching for Skylab =

- A promotional poster for Searching for Skylab
- Directed by: Dwight Steven-Boniecki
- Produced by: AHAB Productions and 1080 Virtual Media Consulting
- Narrated by: Lucas R. Lillpee
- Release date: February 8, 2019
- Running time: 98 minutes
- Language: English

Searching for Skylab - America's Forgotten Triumph is a 2019 documentary about the 1970s American space station Skylab. It was written by Carl Alessi and directed by Dwight Steven-Boniecki and partly crowdfunded.

Searching for Skylab was created to bring attention to the important role Skylab played in the development of human spaceflight programs. Of Skylab, Steven-Boniecki said, "Hundreds of hours of video and audio recordings exist from it, yet it is unlikely that you've seen or heard much of it."

A preview of the first working version of Searching for Skylab was screened at Spacefest, in Tucson, Arizona, July 5, 2018 to a crowd of space experts, astronauts and their families. In November 2018, shortly before the film's completion, a sneak peek of the movie’s working version was presented at the Science Late Show at the Kosmos Kino in Zürich.

The finished documentary was released February 8, 2019, the 45th anniversary of the splashdown of the last Skylab crew.

== Accuracy ==
The film is regarded by experts as being extremely accurate. Correct mission footage is shown in all instances of the movie. Audience members often stated it was "the most accurate space documentary.” Searching for Skylab has been praised by writers for various spaceflight enthusiast communities.

== Production ==
Apart from several mission-specific 30-minute reports from the early 1970s, no attempt had been made to thoroughly document the Skylab program since the last flight returned in 1974. Dwight Steven-Boniecki, compiling material for the Skylab Mission Reports series for Apogee Books, mentioned to his wife Alexandra that it was crucial to distill “many hundreds of hours of video” and “many hundreds of hours of audio” to create a work that would “preserve [Skylab] for future generations."

== Soundtrack ==
German band 10 Cent Janes were approached to compose the film's title song. Dwight met the band's lead singer of the band on a flight from Frankfurt to New Delhi in 2013. Steven-Boniecki felt the group could deliver the style required for the film.

== Release ==
The world premiere of Searching for Skylab took place at the U.S. Space and Rocket Center in Huntsville, Alabama on February 8, 2019. Skylab astronauts Jack Lousma (Skylab 3) and Ed Gibson (Skylab 4) attended, along with Alan Bean’s former wife Sue and daughter Amy, and Huntsville engineers John Reaves, Roy Logston and Willie Weaver.

Owen Garriott (SL-3 Science Pilot), his son Richard (who also flew in space on Soyuz TMA-13/TMA-12), and Jerry Carr (SL-4 Commander) attended remotely via Skype. Herb Baker, son of seamstress Alyene Baker, who sewed the space station's sunshield parasol, and historian Jay Chladek participated in a panel discussion held after the screening.

The film's Australian premiere came in Esperance July 11, 2019. The event was part of the town’s 40th anniversary observance of Skylab's 1979 disintegration over parts of Western Australia.

The documentary was made available for digital download March 1, 2019. Releases on iTunes and Google Play were thrown into jeopardy following the collapse and ultimate bankruptcy of film distributor Distribber.

== Redux version and video archive publication ==
An previously unreleased, updated version of the film has been released, as part of the publication of a video archive. The revised version includes additional footage, and comments from Skylab backup commander, Rusty Schweickart.

The collection of video recordings has been published by the producers of the documentary. They are available as DVDs or as digital editions. Around half of the material was gathered after the original production of the documentary, with some of the material thought to be exclusively available in this publication.

== Critical response ==
Emily Carney, a writer for the National Space Society, wrote that the film was a "treasure trove of as-yet-unseen archival footage" that helped dispel long held myths about the Skylab space station. A writer for Spaceflight Insider also praised the film, writing "If you never flew into space yourself and you’d like to experience what it takes to be an astronaut, you ought to find out watching the film. It’s absolutely thrilling." Richard Speed of UK-based online magazine The Register wrote, "I found the film very enjoyable and would recommend it to anyone with even a passing interest in the space programme. Coming in at just over an hour-and-a-half, it is neither too drawn out or too brief." Swiss Space Museum founder Guido Schwarz said, "Thanks to his extensive research and discussions with experts and astronauts around Skylab, [Dwight Steven-Boniecki] has created a fascinating documentary film about the first American space station that was overshadowed by Apollo." Searching for Skylab was selected by space enthusiasts as one of the “best space documentaries around," according to the website Interesting Engineering.

== Awards ==
Winner of the "Best Documentary" at Eastern Europe Film Festival

Winner of "First Documentary Film" at Sweden Film Awards - October 2020

Winner of "Best Director" for Dwight Steven-Boniecki at Salt House Creative Film Festival - December 2020

Semi Finalist for "Best Science Film" at the Vienna Science Film Festival 2020

Semi Finalist for "Best Documentary Feature " at the Rome Prisma Film Festival 2020

Nominee for "Best Documentary" at the Scene Festival 2021

Winner of "Best International Documentary"at the Channel Islands Film Awards 2021

Winner of "Best First Time Director" at the Prague Monthly International Film Festival - February 2021

Award for "Best Editing" at the Art Film Awards, Skopje, North Macedonia - February 2021

Winner of "Best Documentary Feature: Dimond Award" at the Mindfield Film Festival, Albuquerque, New Mexico, USA - February 2021

Winner of "Best Documentary" at The Hollywood Art and Movie Awards - January 2021
