= Zenon: Z3 =

2004 American television film

- Promotional poster
- Based on: Zenon: Girl of the 21st Century by Marilyn Sadler & Roger Bollen
- Written by: Stu Krieger
- Directed by: Steve Rash
- Starring: Kirsten Storms; Lauren Maltby; Alyson Morgan; Stuart Pankin; Holly Fulger; Raven
- Theme music composer: Kurt Kassulke
- Country of origin: United States
- Original language: English

Production
- Producers: Christopher Morgan; Suzanne Coston; Suzanne de Passe
- Cinematography: Dave Aenmey
- Editor: Terry Stokes
- Running time: 81 minutes
- Production company: de Passe Entertainment

Original release
- Network: Disney Channel
- Release: June 11, 2004

Related
- Zenon: Girl of the 21st Century; Zenon: The Zequel

Zenon: Z3 is a 2004 American science fiction comedy film directed by Steve Rash and starring Kirsten Storms, Raven-Symoné, and Lauren Maltby. It is the third and final installment of the Disney Channel's Zenon television film trilogy, following Zenon: Girl of the 21st Century (1999) and Zenon: The Zequel (2001). The film premiered on Disney Channel on June 11, 2004.

== Plot ==
The year is 2054 and Zenon Kar is now 18. Having always succeeded at everything she does, she immediately jumps at a chance to compete in the first Galactic Teen Supreme contest. However, she currently lacks a hot-pod license required for the first stage – a pod race from Earth to the Moonstock festival located on the Moon. After she experiences a few near-misses during her driving test, a mysterious force takes over her pod, allowing her to land safely on Earth and obtain her license.

Commander Edward Plank and Aunt Judy Kling have a foster daughter named Dasha, who idolizes Zenon and is often getting into trouble. Dasha quickly sets out to become Zenon's clone and conceals herself in Zenon's hot pod before the race. Upon arriving at the Moon and effectively qualifying for the second heat of the contest, Zenon becomes acquainted with her handsome competitor Bronley Hale. However, Sage Borealis, a lone environmentalist intent on stopping the Moonstock Festival and the subsequent colonization of the moon, seeks Zenon's help, though she is confused about what to do and reluctant to quit the competition. Suddenly, the moon guardian Selene appears and threatens to destroy the Earth, summoning heavy rain and snowstorms.

Zenon, Sage, and Dasha along with their friends Margie, Cassie, and Bronley team up with the other racers to rescue Earth's population from Selene's wrath. They evacuate everyone, even passengers in the tour bus belonging to Zenon's idol Proto Zoa. When they try to remove the Moon Dome, with each taking a hover pod, they realize that the dome is too heavy to be lifted.

Upon reuniting with Dasha, Commander Plank and Aunt Judy, who had been unable to communicate with her and Zenon, decide to help the group lift the dome. Their combined efforts ultimately succeed, and the dome is set off to drift into space. Nevertheless, Selene destroys the rest of the base before waving farewell as the friends return to Earth, and the inclement weather finally dissipates.

In the end, Sage and Zenon become intimate and Protozoa's band Microbe holds a concert with a new band, Cosmic Blush. Pat Numbar, the host of the Galactic Teen Supreme contest, invites Zenon to compete in a new contest on Mars in order to attain a proper victory, but she declines, citing that Mars is named after the Roman god of war. Meanwhile, a new colony is settled on Mars.

== Cast ==
- Kirsten Storms as Zenon Kar
- Lauren Maltby as Margie Hammond, Zenon's friend
- Alyson Morgan as Dasha Plank, Judy & Edward's foster daughter and Zenon's cousin
- Stuart Pankin as Commander Edward Plank, Dasha's foster father and Zenon's uncle
- Holly Fulger as Aunt Judy Kling-Plank, Dasha's mother and Zenon's aunt
- Raven as Nebula Wade, Zenon's best friend
- Ben Easter as Sage Borealis, Zenon's third love interest
- Nathan Anderson as Proto Zoa, Zenon's idol
- Glenn McMillan as Bronley Hale, Zenon's friend
- Damon Berry as Pat Numbar
- Phumi Mthembu as Cassie, Zenon's friend
- Carol Reynolds as Selena
  - Joanna Evans as Young Selena
- Nikki Joshua as Cosmic Blush

Note: Storms, Maltby, Pankin, and Fulger are the only cast members to appear in all three films in the Zenon trilogy.

== Soundtrack ==
Zenon: Z3

Soundtrack album by Various artists
- Released: June 8, 2004
- Genre: Pop
- Length: 35:43
- Label: Walt Disney

Track listing

1. Cosmic Blush & Proto Zoa - "Out of This World" – 3:40
2. Christy Carlson Romano - "Anyone But Me" – 3:22
3. April Start - "All About You" – 3:57
4. Miss Jess - "Some Say" – 3:19
5. Kristian Rex - "Supernova Girl (Z3 Remix)" – 2:40
6. Proto Zoa - "The Galaxy Is Ours" – 2:36
7. Cassiøpeia - "Plan B" – 3:00
8. Selena the Moon Goddess - "Lucky Star" – 3:44
9. The Super Novas - "Outa-Space (Instrumental)" – 3:43
10. Cosmic Blush & Proto Zoa - "Out of This World (Lunar Remix)" – 3:11

== See also ==
- List of films featuring space stations
