= Sydney (TV series) =

1990 American television comedy created by Michael J. Wilson and Douglas Wyman

- Craig Bierko, Valerie Bertinelli, and Matthew Perry in Sydney
- Genre: Sitcom
- Created by: Michael J. Wilson; Douglas Wyman
- Written by: Michael J. Wilson; Billy Van Zandt; Jane Milmore
- Directed by: Lee Shallat-Chemel; Iris Dugow; Art Wolff; Robert Berlinger; John Ratzenberger
- Starring: Valerie Bertinelli; Matthew Perry; Craig Bierko; Daniel Baldwin; Barney Martin
- Theme music composer: Eddie Van Halen; Alex Van Halen
- Opening theme: "Finish What Ya Started" performed by Van Halen
- Composer: Mason Cooper
- Country of origin: United States
- Original language: English
- No. of seasons: 1
- No. of episodes: 13

Production
- Executive producer: Pamela Grant
- Camera setup: Multi-camera
- Running time: 22–24 min
- Production companies: Oomp & Friends Productions; Gold Hat Entertainment; Grant/Tribune Productions

Original release
- Network: CBS
- Release: March 21 – June 25, 1990

Sydney is an American sitcom television series starring Valerie Bertinelli, Matthew Perry, and Craig Bierko that aired on CBS from March 21 to June 25, 1990. It was created and written by Michael J. Wilson and Douglas Wyman. This series marked Valerie Bertinelli's first return to the network in a starring role since One Day at a Time concluded its nine-season run in May 1984.

== Premise ==
Sydney Kells (Valerie Bertinelli), a private investigator from a family of police officers, relocates her one-woman private detective agency from New York City to her small hometown. There, Sydney struggles to balance her personal and professional life. Her main client is an uptight lawyer, Matt Keating (Craig Bierko), with whom she shares sexual chemistry. Her over-protective brother Billy (Matthew Perry), a rookie officer, tries to help her when he can. Sydney and her best friend Jill (Rebeccah Bush) frequent a neighborhood bar run by Ray (Barney Martin), her father's old police partner.

== Cast ==
- Valerie Bertinelli as Sydney Kells
- Matthew Perry as Billy Kells
- Craig Bierko as Matt Keating
- Barney Martin as Ray
- Rebeccah Bush as Jill
- Perry Anzilotti as Perry
- Daniel Baldwin as Cheezy
- Georgia Brown as Linda Kells

== Theme song ==
Bertinelli convinced then-husband Eddie Van Halen to grant permission for the Van Halen song "Finish What Ya Started" to be used as the opening theme song to Sydney.

== Episodes ==
Season	Episodes	Originally released	
Season	Episodes	First released	Last released
1	13	March 21, 1990	June 25, 1990

=== Season 1 (1990) ===
No.	Title	Directed by	Written by	Original release date	Prod. code
1	"You? You're a Private Eye?"	Lee Shallat	Michael J. Wilson	March 21, 1990	3105
Sydney returns home trying to get a job. Guest stars : Tom Byrd, Rod McCary, and James Gregory Capps
2	"Promises, Promises"	Iris Dugow	Michael Wilson	March 28, 1990	3107
Matt goes to Sydney's home to hide from hired thugs who try to prevent him from working on a case. Guest stars : Jeff 'Gonzo' Raymond, Liz Hitchler, and Felicia Michaels
3	"Cliffhanger"	Lee Shallat	Michael Wilson	April 4, 1990	3106
A childhood crush reappears in Sydney's life while Matt continues to hide. Guest stars : Michael G. Hagerty, Kent Williams, and Michael Knight
4	"Love Ya, Babe"	Lee Shallat	Story by : Michael Wilson & Douglas Wyman; Teleplay by : Michael Wilson	April 11, 1990	3109
Sydney prepares for a trial while Matt argues with Jill. Guest stars : Steve Mittleman, Chazz Palminteri, David Pressman, and Brandon Michael Vayda
5	"She Loves Me"	Lee Shallat	Michael Wilson	April 18, 1990	3107
Billy falls in love with Matt's client. Guest star : Kristen Cloke
6	"I Gotta Be Me"	Lee Shallat	Michael Wilson	April 23, 1990	3110
Sydney tries to prepare to meet one of the law partners, but things go awry. Guest star : Earl Boen
7	"Georgie"	John Ratzenberger	Michael Wilson & Barney Dunn & Maria A. Brown	April 25, 1990	3111
Sydney is hesitant to work with another private investigator. Guest stars : Pat Harrington, Jr., Tony Longo, and Mickey Jones
8	"The Me Nobody Knows"	Iris Dugow	Michael Wilson	May 2, 1990	3104
Sydney tries to help a person who suffers from amnesia. Guest stars : Stephen Furst, Hamilton Camp, and Yeardley Smith
9	"Sydney's Mom"	Art Wolff	Michael Wilson & Douglas Wyman & Maria Brown	May 23, 1990	3103
Sydney does not trust her mother's new boyfriend. Guest stars : Richard Schaal, Andy Dick, Elaine Hausman, and Bradley Mott
10	"36-24-36"	Art Wolff	Michael Wilson & Douglas Wyman & Maria Brown	June 4, 1990	3102
A reporter shadows Sydney in order to write a book about her. Guest stars : Annabelle Gurwitch, J.J. Wall, and Kathleen Freeman
11	"On a Claire Day"	Robert Berlinger	Billy Van Zandt & Jane Milmore	June 11, 1990	3112
Matt thinks his girlfriend is cheating on him and asks Sydney to investigate her. Guest stars : Jane Milmore, John York, and Jeffrey Allan Chandler
12	"Jake"	Ellen Falcon	Michael Wilson & Douglas Wyman	June 18, 1990	5001
Sydney's past catches up with her as a criminal is released from prison and comes looking for her. Guest stars : Kevin Dunn, Asher Levin, and Nicky Rose
13	"Chicken a la Matt"	Lee Shallat	Michael Wilson	June 25, 1990	3113
Sydney is hesitant to go to Matt and Claire's wedding. Guest stars : Jane Milmore, Billy Van Zandt, Jane Ulyshen, and Eda Reiss Merin
