= Adrienne Barbeau =

American actress (born 1945)

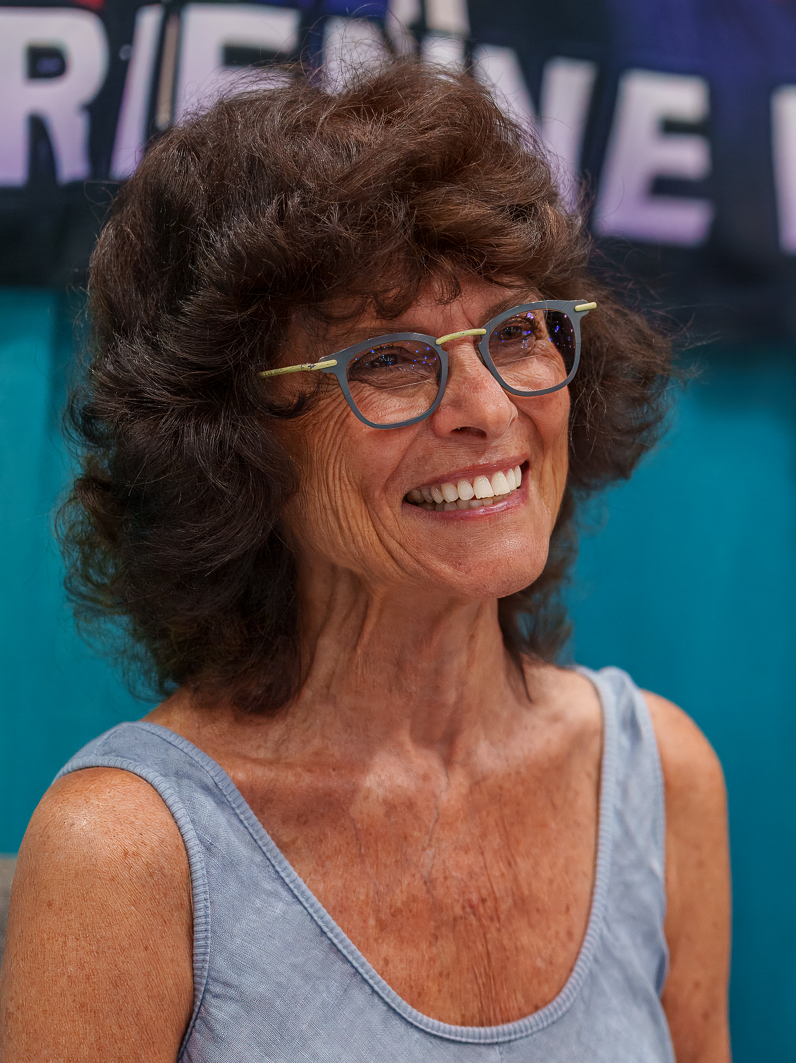
- Barbeau in 2025
- Born: Adrienne Jo Barbeau; June 11, 1945 (age 81); Sacramento, California, United States
- Education: Foothill College
- Occupations: Actress; author
- Years active: 1968–present
- Known for: Grease (1971); Maude (1972); The Fog (1980); Escape from New York (1981); Swamp Thing (1982); The Cannonball Run (1981); Creepshow (1982); General Hospital (1963); DC Animated Universe
- Spouses: John Carpenter (m. 1979; div. 1984) Billy Van Zandt (m. 1992; div. 2018)
- Children: 3, including Cody Carpenter
- Relatives: Anton Barbeau (brother)
- Website: abarbeau.com

Adrienne Jo Barbeau (born June 11, 1945) is an American actress and author. She came to prominence in the 1970s as Broadway's original Betty Rizzo in the musical Grease, and as Carol Traynor, the divorced daughter of Maude Findlay (played by Bea Arthur) on the sitcom Maude (1972–1978). In 1980, she began appearing in horror and science fiction films, including The Fog (1980), Escape from New York (1981), Creepshow (1982), and Swamp Thing (1982). She also provided the voice of Catwoman in the DC Animated Universe. In the 2000s, she appeared on the HBO series Carnivàle (2003–2005) as Ruthie.

== Early life ==
Barbeau was born on June 11, 1945, in Sacramento, California, the daughter of Armene (née Nalbandian) and Joseph Barbeau, who was a public relations executive for Mobil Oil. Her mother was of Armenian descent and her father's ancestry was French Canadian, Irish, and German. She has a sister, Jocelyn, and a half brother on her father's side, Robert Barbeau, who still resides in the Sacramento area.

She attended Del Mar High School in San Jose, California. After graduating in 1963, she enrolled at Foothill College in Los Altos Hills, California, but dropped out at age 19 to participate in a USO Tour with the San Jose Light Opera. In her autobiography, Barbeau says that she first caught the show business bug while entertaining troops at army bases throughout Southeast Asia, touring with the San Jose Civic Light Opera.

== Career ==
=== 1960s–1989 ===
In the late 1960s, Barbeau moved to New York City and worked "for the mob" as a Go-Go dancer. She made her Broadway debut in the chorus of Fiddler on the Roof and later took the role of Hodel, Tevye's daughter; Bette Midler played her character's sister Tzeitel. She left Fiddler in 1971 to play the leading role of Cookie Kovac in the off-Broadway nudie musical Stag Movie. Barbeau, as Cookie Kovac, and Brad Sullivan, as Rip Cord, were "quite jolly and deserve to be congratulated on the lack of embarrassment they show when, on occasion, they have to wander around stark naked. They may not be sexy but they certainly keep cheerful," wrote The New York Times theater critic Clive Barnes in an otherwise negative review. Barbeau went on to appear in more than 25 musicals and plays, including Women Behind Bars, The Best Little Whorehouse in Texas, and Grease. She received a Theater World Award and a 1972 Tony Award nomination for her portrayal of tough-girl Rizzo in Grease.

During the 1970s, Barbeau starred as Carol Traynor, the daughter of Bea Arthur's title character, on the comedy series Maude, which ran from 1972 to 1978 (actress Marcia Rodd had originated the role of Carol in a 1972 episode of All in the Family, also titled "Maude," alongside Arthur). In her autobiography, There Are Worse Things I Could Do, Barbeau remarked: "What I didn't know is that when I said [my lines] I was usually walking down a flight of stairs and no one was even listening to me. They were just watching my breasts precede me." During the last season of Maude, Barbeau did not appear in the majority of the episodes. In a 2009 Entertainment Tonight TV interview, Barbeau mentioned that she had good on- and off-camera chemistry with Arthur; she said that the two stayed close until Arthur's death on April 25, 2009. Barbeau and Arthur reunited on camera during a 2007 taping of The View, reminiscing about their long-running friendship and their years as co-stars on Maude. About her relationship with Arthur, Barbeau said in a 2018 interview with Dread Central:

"I was doing an interview for this one-woman show that I am doing and the interviewer asked, 'What do people usually ask you,' and I said, 'They always want to know what it was like working with Bea.' She was fantastic and, you know, I realized years later how much I took it for granted because it was my first experience on television. I just assumed that everyone was as giving as she was, as professional as she was, that everyone who was doing a TV show showed up knowing their lines and showed up on time and was willing to say to the writers, 'I think this line was funnier if Adie had said it or Conrad had said it or Bill had said it.' I mean, she was just the best, she was the best, very funny. She was not Maude when she wasn't saying those lines. I don't know if I'd say she was quiet. She was a homebody. She had her sons, her dog and her cooking and she wasn't into the celebrity scene and she was a great lady. I loved her dearly and we had a great cast and they were my family for six years. I loved each of them and all of them and it was the best experience anyone could've had, being introduced to television like that!"

Barbeau made guest appearances in numerous television films and series such as The Love Boat, Fantasy Island, Valentine Magic on Love Island, and Battle of the Network Stars. In her autobiography, she claimed: "I actually thought CBS asked me to be on Battle of the Network Stars because they thought I was athletic. My husband clued me in: who cared if I won the race, as long as I bounced when I ran?"

The popularity of Barbeau's 1978 cheesecake poster confirmed her status as a sex symbol. Barbeau's popularity stemmed partly from what critic Joe Bob Briggs referred to as the "two enormous talents on that woman," and her typecasting as a "tough broad". Despite her initial success, she said at the time that she thought of Hollywood as a "flesh market" and that she would rather appear in films that "explore the human condition" and "deal with issues".

Barbeau's then-husband, director John Carpenter, cast her in his horror film, The Fog (1980), which was her first theatrical film appearance. The film was released on February 1, 1980, and was a theatrical success, grossing over $21 million in the United States alone, and establishing Barbeau as a genre film star. She subsequently appeared in a number of early-1980s horror and science fiction films, including Escape from New York (1981) (also from Carpenter), Creepshow (1982) and Swamp Thing (1982). Of her screen work with Carpenter, Barbeau has stated: "John is a great director. He knows what he wants and he knows how to get it. It's simple and it's easy [working with him]."

She also appeared in the Burt Reynolds comedy The Cannonball Run (1981), and as the wife of Rodney Dangerfield's character in Back to School (1986). Barbeau also starred in the comedy Cannibal Women in the Avocado Jungle of Death (1989).

=== 1990s–present ===
In the 1990s, Barbeau mostly appeared in made-for-television films such as Scott Turow's The Burden of Proof (1992), as well as playing Oswald's mother on The Drew Carey Show and gaining new fame among animation fans as Catwoman on Batman: The Animated Series and Gotham Girls.

She also worked as a television talk show host and a weekly book reviewer for KABC talk radio in Los Angeles. In 1999, she guest starred in the Star Trek: Deep Space Nine episode "Inter Arma Enim Silent Leges" as Romulan Senator Kimara Cretak.

In 1998, Barbeau released her debut album as a folk singer, the self-titled Adrienne Barbeau. She starred in the cartoon series Totally Spies! doing the voice of villainess Helga Von Guggen in seasons 1, 2 and 4.

From 2003 to 2005, she starred on the HBO series Carnivàle. From March to May 2006, she starred as Judy Garland in the off-Broadway play The Property Known as Garland.

in 2007, Barbeau played a cameo role in Rob Zombie's Halloween, a "reimagining" of the 1978 film of the same name, written and directed by her first husband, John Carpenter. Her scene was cut from the theatrical version of the film but is included in the DVD version.

In 2009, Barbeau was cast as "The Cat Lady" in the family comedy The Dog Who Saved Christmas, as Scooter's mother in the 3D animated feature Fly Me to the Moon, and as a hospice patient in the love story Reach for Me.

Also in 2009, Barbeau had guest spots in the first episode of Showtime's series Dexter (Season 4).

She voiced the Greek goddess Hera in the video game God of War III released for the PlayStation 3 in March 2010. In August 2010, she began a role on the long-running ABC daytime drama General Hospital. In 2012 to 2015, she had a role as Victoria Grayson's (Madeleine Stowe) mother on the ABC drama Revenge.

In 2012, she voiced UNSC scientist Dr. Tilson in the highly anticipated game Halo 4, released on the Xbox 360 in November 2012. She voiced characters in the 2015 Mad Max video game.

She appears in Argo (2012), playing the former wife of Alan Arkin's character.

Barbeau reprised her role as Catwoman in an animated remake of the third trailer for The Dark Knight Rises. This trailer was made to both celebrate the upcoming film as well as to promote Hub's ten episode marathon of Batman: The Animated Series.

In 2015, she assumed the role of Berthe in Pippin with the Broadway Touring Company of the renowned musical.

In 2021, Barbeau voiced the role of Queen Gehenna in the sci-fi musical audio series, The World to Come.

== Personal life ==
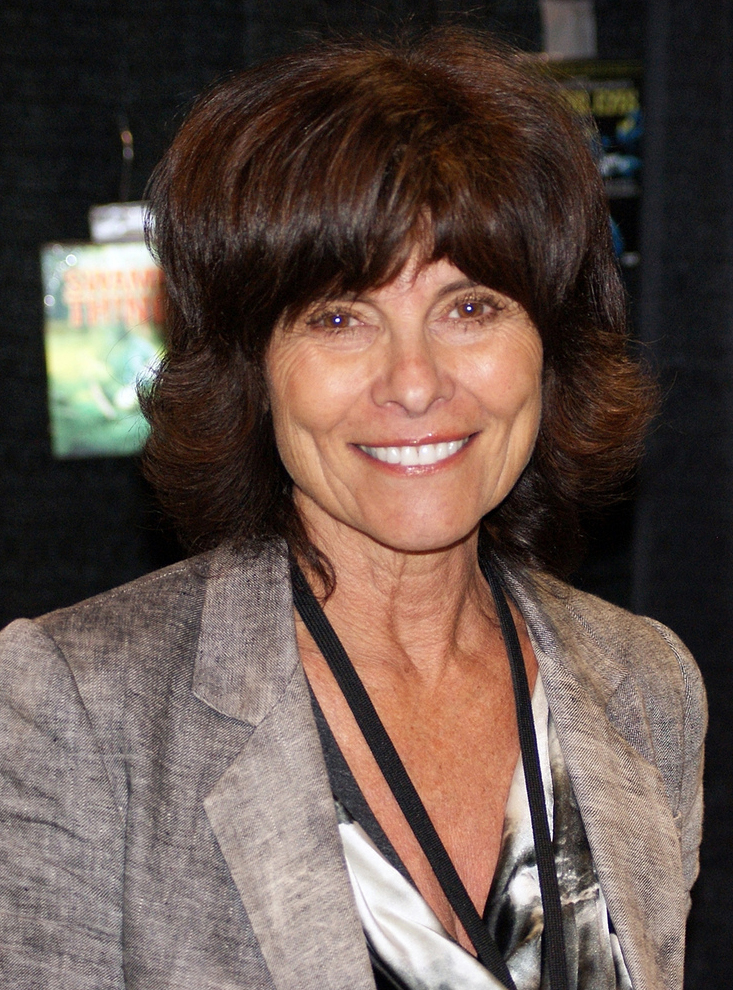
Barbeau attending the Calgary Comic & Entertainment Expo in BMO Centre, Calgary, Alberta, Canada on June 19, 2011.

In 1978, Barbeau met director John Carpenter on the set of his television film Someone's Watching Me! The couple wed on January 1, 1979, and lived in the Studio City side of Coldwater Canyon, reportedly remaining "totally outside Hollywood's social circles." They remained together for five years, but separated shortly after the birth of their son John "Cody" Carpenter on May 7, 1984. The couple divorced later that year.

In 1991, Barbeau met actor/playwright/producer Billy Van Zandt, when she was cast in the West Coast premiere of his play Drop Dead!. They wed in 1992. On March 17, 1997, at the age of almost 52, Barbeau gave birth to twin boys, quipping that she was the only one on the maternity ward who was a member of AARP. The couple filed for divorce in 2018.

== Filmography ==
=== Film ===
Year	Title	Role	Notes
1980	The Fog	Stevie Wayne	
1981	Escape from New York	Maggie	
1981	The Cannonball Run	Marcie	
1982	Swamp Thing	Alice Cable	
1982	The Thing	Chess Computer	Voice
1982	Creepshow	Wilma Northrup	Segment: "The Crate"
1984	The Next One	Andrea	
1984	Terror in the Aisles	Stevie Wayne	Archival footage
1986	Back to School	Vanessa	
1987	Open House	Lisa Grant	
1989	Cannibal Women in the Avocado Jungle of Death	Dr. Kurtz	
1990	The Easter Story	Mary Magdalene	Voice, direct-to-video short
1990	Two Evil Eyes	Jessica Valdemar	Segment: "The Facts in the Case of Mr. Valdemar"
1993	Father Hood	Celeste	
1993	Demolition Man	Main Frame Computer	Uncredited voice
1994	Silk Degrees	Violet	
1995	Judge Dredd	Central	Voice, uncredited
1998	Scooby-Doo on Zombie Island	Simone Lenoir	Voice, direct-to-video
1999	A Wake in Providence	Aunt Lidia	
2000	Across the Line	Mrs. Randall	
2000	The Convent	Adult Christine	
2002	No Place Like Home	Evie	
2003	Ghost Rock	Mattie Baker	
2007	Halloween	Adoption Agency Secretary	Her role was cut from the final finished film, but was later included on the DVD Special Edition
2007	Unholy	Martha	
2008	Fly Me to the Moon	Scooter's mother	Voice
2008	Reach for Me	Valerie	
2009	Alice Jacobs Is Dead	Alice Jacobs	Short film
2012	Complacent	Judy Sanderson	
2012	Argo	Nina / Serski	
2015	Divine Access	Catherine	
2016	ISRA 88	Dr. Withersford	
2017	Death House	Narrator	
2018	Big Legend	Rita Laird	
2018	For the Love of Jessee	Katharyn	
2020	Unearth	Kathryn Dolan	
2020	Curious George: Go West, Go West	Ginny's Mom	Voice
2022	Hellblazers	Georgia	
2022	Early Retirement	Pat	(Short)
2023	Oddities	Susan	(Short)
2024	Watchmen	Sally Jupiter / Silk Specter I, TV Broadcaster, Police Dispatcher	Voice; Direct-to-Video
2025	The Pitchfork Retreat	Elle	
2026	Oddities		(Feature)

=== Television ===
Year	Title	Role	Notes
1972–1978	Maude	Carol Traynor	Regular role (93 episodes)
1974–1975	Match Game	Herself	Celebrity panelist in episodes airing in September and December 1974 and August 1975
1976	The Great Houdini	Daisy White	Television film
1976	Julie Farr, M.D.	Allie Duggin	Television film
1977	Eight Is Enough	Jennifer Linden	Episode: "Turnabout"
1977	Red Alert	Judy Wyche	Television film
1977	Quincy, M.E.	Carol Bowen	Episode: "Let Me Light the Way"
1977	Have I Got a Christmas for You	Marcia Levine	Television film
1978	The Fighting Nightingales	Maj. Kate Steele	Television film
1978	The Love Boat	Cathy Randall	2 episodes
1978	Crash	Veronica Daniels	Television film
1978	Someone's Watching Me!	Sophie	Television film
1978	Fantasy Island	Margo Dean	Episode: "Return to Fantasy Island"
1979	$weepstake$	Bonnie Jones	1 episode
1979	Fantasy Island	Brenda Richards	Episode: "The Pug/Class of '69"
1979	The Darker Side of Terror	Margaret Corwin	Television film
1980	Top of the Hill	Elizabeth Stone	Television film
1980	Valentine Magic on Love Island	Beverly McGraw	Television film
1980	Tourist	Barbara Huggins	Television film
1981	Charlie and the Great Balloon Chase	Susan O'Neill	Television film
1983	Fantasy Island	Adele Anthony	Episode: "Midnight Waltz/Let Them Eat Cake"
1983-1988	The $25,000 Pyramid	Herself	Celebrity guest star in 45 episodes airing between January 1983 and April 1988
1984	Hotel	Barbara Harrington	Episode: "Tomorrows"
1985	Seduced	Barbara Orloff	Television film
1985	Murder, She Wrote	Kathryn	Episode: "Jessica Behind Bars"
1985	Bridge Across Time	Lynn Chandler	Television film
1985	The Twilight Zone	Miss Peters	Episode: "Teacher's Aide"
1985-1987	The $100,000 Pyramid	Herself	Celebrity guest star in 35 episodes airing between November 1985 and January 1988
1986	Hotel	Ellie	Episode: "Shadow Play"
1987	Murder, She Wrote	Lynette Bryant	Episode: "The Bottom Line Is Murder"
1987	Ultraman: The Adventure Begins	Lt. Beth O'Brien	Voice, television film
1989	Monsters	Fiona FLynn	Episode: "All in a Days Work"
1989	Head of the Class	Gloria	Episode: "The Little Sister"
1990	CBS Schoolbreak Special	Mary Martelli	Episode: "The Fourth Man"
1991	Blood River	Georgina	Television film
1991	Doublecrossed	Debbie Seal	Television film
1991	The $100,000 Pyramid	Herself	Celebrity guest star for 10 episodes airing February 18 to 22, 1991, and December 2 to 6, 1991
1992	The Burden of Proof	Silvia Hartnell	Television film
1992	Dream On	Gloria Gantz	Episode: "Bad Girls"
1992–1995	Batman: The Animated Series	Selina Kyle / Catwoman	Voice, 7 episodes
1993	FBI: The Untold Stories	Marguerite Dobson	Episode: "Dapper Drew"
1993	ABC Weekend Special	Lucinda 'Lucy' Condraj	Episode: "The Parsley Garden"
1993	Daddy Dearest	Annette	Episode: "You Bet Your Life"
1994	One West Waikiki	Edna Jaynes	Episode: "A Model for Murder"
1994	The George Carlin Show	Barbara Rossetti	Episode: "George Gets Caught in the Middle"
1994	Babylon 5	Amanda Carter	Episode: "Spider in the Web"
1994	Jailbreakers	Mrs. Norton	Television film
1995	Bram Stoker's Burial of the Rats	The Queen	Television film
1996	Flipper	Sydney Brewster	2 episodes
1996	The Wayans Bros.	Trish Neidermeyer	Episode: "New Lease on Life"
1997	Weird Science	Lily	Episode: "Show Chett"
1997–1998	The New Batman Adventures	Selina Kyle / Catwoman	Voice, 2 episodes
1997	Sliders	Mother Morehouse	Episode: "Oh Brother, Where Art Thou?"
1998	A Champion's Fight	Nancy Muldenhower	Television film
1998	Diagnosis: Murder	Vivien Sanderson	Episode: "Rain of Terror"
1998	The Angry Beavers	Toluca Lake	Voice, episode: "The Day the Earth Got Really Screwed Up"
1998	Adventures from the Book of Virtues	Greta	Voice, episode: "Honor"
1998–2004	The Drew Carey Show	Kim Harvey	Recurring role (6 episodes)
1999	Love Boat: The Next Wave	Grace Brooks	Episode: "Three Stages of Love"
1999	Star Trek: Deep Space Nine	Senator Cretak	Episode: "Inter Arma Enim Silent Leges"
2000	Batman Beyond	Singer	Voice, episode: "Out of the Past"
2000–2002	Gotham Girls	Selina Kyle / Catwoman, Renee Montoya	Voice, main role
2001	Nash Bridges	Annie Corell	Episode: "Something Borrowed"
2001	Sabrina the Teenage Witch	Herself	Episode: "The Gift of Gab"
2002–2004	Totally Spies!	Helga Von Guggen	Voice, 2 episodes
2002	The Chronicle	Evelyn Hall	Episode: "Tears of a Clone"
2002	The Santa Trap	Alice	Television film
2003–2005	Carnivàle	Ruthie	Regular role (24 episodes)
2004	Ring of Darkness	Alex	Television film
2006	Deceit	Kathleen Darrow	Television film
2006	Christmas Do-Over	Trudi	Television film
2007	K-Ville	Marquetta Dinovi	Episode: "Bedfellows"
2008	Cold Case	Helen McCormick	Episode: "Wings"
2009	War Wolves	Gail Cash	Television film
2009	Dexter	Suzanna Coffey	Episode: "Living the Dream"
2009	Grey's Anatomy	Jodie Crawley	Episode: "I Always Feel Like Somebody's Watchin' Me"
2009	The Dog Who Saved Christmas	Cat Lady Mildred	Television film
2010	The New Adventures of Old Christine	Herself	Episode: "A Whale of a Tale"
2010	Proposition 8 Trial Re-Enactment	Dr. Letitia Peplau	Television documentary
2010	The Dog Who Saved Christmas Vacation	Mildred	Television film
2010–2011	General Hospital	Suzanne Stanwyck	Regular role
2011	CSI: NY	Dr. Theola Kumi	Episode: "Smooth Criminal"
2012, 2015	Revenge	Marion Harper	2 episodes
2013	Sons of Anarchy	Alice	Episode: "Sweet and Vaded"
2014	Criminal Minds	Cissy Howard	Episode: "Blood Relations"
2015	American Dad!	Maxine	Episode: "A Star is Reborn"
2019	Swamp Thing	Dr. Palomar	Episode: "Long Walk Home"
2019	Creepshow	Dixie Parmalee, Radio Host	2 episodes
2020	AJ and the Queen	Helen	Episode: "Columbus"
2020	Curious George: Go West, Go Wild	Ginny's mother	Voice, television film
2021	American Horror Stories	Verna	Episode: "Drive In"
2021	Cowboy Bebop	Maria Murdock	Episode: "Callisto Soul"
2023	9-1-1	Lois Gilbertson (soon to be Mrs. Phillip Garrity)	Episode: "Love Is in the Air"
2023	Harlan Corben's Shelter	Ellen Bolitar	Recurring
2025	Duster	Evelyn Breen [HBO Max]	Recurring
2026	X-Men '97	Sister Anne	Voice, episode "Danger.exe"

=== Stage ===
Year	Title	Role	Notes
1967	Half a Sixpence	Gwendolyn	The Pocono Playhouse
1968	Fiddler on the Roof	Berille (Replacement)/Hodel (Replacement)	Imperial Theatre, Broadway
1971	Stag Movie	Cookie Kovac	Gate Theatre, Off-Broadway
1972	Grease	Betty Rizzo	Eden Theatre, Broadway
1983	Women Behind Bars	Gloria	Roxy Theatre
1988	A Walk on the Wild Side	Hallie	Back Alley Theatre
1993	The Best Little Whorehouse in Texas	Mona Stangley	Sacramento Light Opera
2006	The Property Known as Garland	Judy Garland	Actors' Playhouse, Off-Broadway
2015	Pippin	Berthe (Replacement)	National Tour

=== Video games ===
Year	Title	Role	Notes
1999	Descent 3	Dr. Katelyn Harper	
2006	Marvel: Ultimate Alliance	Sif	
2009	Batman: Arkham Asylum	Dr. Gretchen Whistler / Voice of Arkham Asylum	
2010	God of War III	Hera	
2012	Kingdoms of Amalur: Reckoning	Ciara Sydanus	
2012	Halo 4	Dr. Tillson	
2012	Hitman: Absolution	Hotel Manager's Wife	
2013	God of War: Ascension	Aletheia	
2015	Mad Max	Pink Eye	
2018	Fallout 76	The Overseer	
2020	Wastelanders	The Overseer	
2020	Steel Dawn	The Overseer	
2023	Spider-Man 2	Cafe Lady / Civilians	
2023	Starfield	Betty Howser	

== Awards and nominations ==
Year	Award	Category	Nominated work	Result
1972	Theatre World Awards	Performance	Grease	Won
1972	Tony Awards	Best Supporting or Featured Actress in a Musical	Grease	Nominated
1977	Golden Globe Awards	Best Supporting Actress – Series, Miniseries or Television Film	Maude	Nominated
1991	Fangoria Chainsaw Awards	Best Supporting Actress – Television Film	Due occhi diabolici	Nominated
1993	Theatre World Awards	Performance	Grease	Nominated
1999	Online Film & Television Association Awards	OFTA Television Award	Star Trek: Deep Space Nine	Nominated
2002	Fangoria Chainsaw Awards	Best Supporting Actress	The Convent	Won
2004	Satellite Awards	Best Supporting Actress – Television Series	Carnivàle	Nominated
2007	ShockerFest International Film Festival	Lifetime Achievement Award	Recognized for her long-standing impact on horror cinema	Honoured
2010	Chicago Horror Film Festival	Festival Award for Best Actress	Alice Jacobs Is Dead	Won
2012	New York City Horror Film Festival	Lifetime Achievement Award	Contributions to the History of Horror	Honoured
2016	New York City Horror Film Festival	Lifetime Achievement Award	—N/a	Won
2023	Hollywood Reel Independent Film Festival	Best Actress in a Short Film	Early Retirement	Won
2023	FANtastic Horror Film Festival, San Diego	Best Supporting Actress in a Short Film	Oddities	Won
2023	Los Angeles CINEVERSE Film Festival	Best Performance	Early Retirement	Won
2024	Coolidge Corner Theatre	Coolidge After Midnite Award	The Fog & Escape from New York	Honoured
2024	Nightmare in the Ozarks Film Festival	Best Actress	Oddities	Won
2024	Riverrun International Film Festival	Master of Cinema	Special Master of Cinema	Won

== Bibliography ==
Barbeau's autobiography There Are Worse Things I Could Do was published in 2006 by Carroll & Graf Publishers, rising to No. 11 on the Los Angeles Times bestseller list. In July 2008, her first novel, Vampyres of Hollywood, was published by St. Martin's Press. The novel was co-written by Michael Scott. The first sequel Love Bites was published in 2010, and the second, Make Me Dead, was published in 2015.

- Barbeau, Adrienne (2006). There Are Worse Things I Could Do. New York: Carroll & Graf. ISBN 9780786716371. OCLC 65432367.
- Barbeau, Adrienne; Scott, Michael (2008). Vampyres of Hollywood. New York: Thomas Dunne Books/St. Martin's Press. ISBN 9780312367220. OCLC 184822839.
- Barbeau, Adrienne (2010). Love Bites. New York: Thomas Dunne Books/St. Martin's Press. ISBN 9780312367282. OCLC 526077059.
- Barbeau, Adrienne (2015). Make Me Dead. New Orleans, Louisiana: booksBnimble. ASIN B00ZD3K2S4.
