= Magda Harout =

American actress (1926–2021)

- Publicity Photo of Magda Harout
- Born: April 22, 1926; Los Angeles, California, U.S.
- Died: September 9, 2021 (aged 95); Los Angeles, California, U.S.
- Occupation: Actress
- Years active: 1959–2013 (film and television)

Magda L. Kardashian (née Harout, April 22, 1926 – September 9, 2021) was an American film, television and stage actress.

== Life and career ==
Harout was born in Los Angeles, California on April 22, 1926, to Armenian-born stage actor Yeghishe Harout, and his wife Gohar. Her father was also the proprietor of the Ivar Theatre, which opened on the Hollywood Boulevard in 1951. During the 1940s, Harout was a pageant queen, and in 1943 she sold war bonds to support U.S. troops during World War II. On May 29, 1947, she married Robert Thomas Kardashian (1920–1998), an Army Air Forces veteran, at the First Congregation Church in Los Angeles. They later honeymooned in Hawaii.

Her stage credits included Nine Armenians (1997) by Leslie Ayvazia and The Kiss at City Hall (2000). She received a number of awards for her appearances on stage, including from LA Weekly, Drama-Logue and the LA Drama Critics Circle.

In 1999, Harout played the role of Aunt Alma in the independent comedy film A Wake in Providence. Producer and writer Vincent Pagano cast Harout promptly after meeting her, stating that "Magda opened her mouth, and we immediately fell in love with her voice.".

Harout spoke Russian, Armenian and French, and dyed her hair lighter in order not to be typecast in stereotypical ethnic roles. She also appeared in a number of television commercials. Harout died in Woodland Hills, California on September 9, 2021, at the age of 95.

== Filmography ==
=== Films ===
Year	Film	Role	Director	Notes
1959	Crime and Punishment U.S.A.		Denis Sanders	
1963	The Three Stooges Go Around the World in a Daze	Hand Maiden	Norman Maurer	Uncredited
1972	Another Nice Mess	Duchess of Zanzig	Bob Einstein	
1974	Hangup	Proprietor	Henry Hathaway	
1989	Transylvania Twist	Peasant Woman	Jim Wynorski	
1990	Hollywood Boulevard II	Selma	Steve Barnett	
1991	9½ Ninjas!	Gladys Vogue	Aaron Barsky	
1993	My Life	Aunt Sonia	Bruce Joel Rubin	
1993	King B: A Life in the Movies	Virginia King	Mike Valerio	Documentary
1996	The Elevator	Russian Maid 1	Arthur Borman, Nigel Dick, and Rafal Zielinski	
1999	A Wake in Providence	Aunt Alma	Rosario Roveto Jr.	
2001	Size 'Em Up	Clara	Chris J. Russo	Short film
2013	Baggage Claim	Weisha	David E. Talbert	

=== Television ===
Year(s)	Title	Role(s)	Notes
1963	Dr. Kildare	Magda Kovar	S2E27 "Ship's Doctor"
1965	I Dream of Jeannie	Woman	S1E2 "My Hero?"
1965	Bob Hope Presents the Chrysler Theatre	Chauffeur	S3E7 "Russian Roulette"
1966	Family Affair	Nural	S1E8 "Who's Afraid of Nural Shpeni?"
1967	Mr. Terrific	Doris	S1E13 "Stanley Goes to the Dentist"
1971	Ironside	Zabelle	S4E22 "The Summer Soldier"
1978	Are You in the House Alone?	Malevich	TV movie
1978	The Pirate	Aida	TV movie
1980	Lou Grant	Lavenia Hartounian	S3E17 "Inheritance"
1985	Cagney & Lacey	Saleslady	S4E13 "Happily Ever After"
1985	MacGyver	Woman	S1E3 "Thief of Budapest"
1985	Mr. Belvedere	Rose	S2E4 "Requiem"
1985–1986	Gimme a Break!	Various roles	3 episodes
1986	The New Gidget	Mother	S1E7 "Jeff's Anniversary"
1986	Sidekicks	Mrs. Rizzo	S1E10 "I Remember Mama, But Does She Remember Me?"
1987	Punky Brewster	The Saleslady	S3E9 "The Metamorphosis"
1988	Mama's Family	Eulalie Griswald	S4E14 "The Sins of the Mother"
1988	Webster	Grace	S6E4 "Papa's Big Romance"
1988	The Golden Girls	Woman	S4E1 "Yes, We Have No Havanas"
1989	Class Cruise	Mrs. Rose	TV movie
1989	The Famous Teddy Z		S1E7 "Baking with Esther Luna"
1989	Quantum Leap	Mrs. Miriam Davitz	S2E7 "Thou Shalt Not... - February 2, 1974"
1989	Night Court	Sascha Minkoff	S7E7 "Auntie Maim"
1990	Newhart	Smitty	S8E16 "Seein' Double"
1990	Days of Our Lives	Madame Blavatsky	Episode #6,316
1990	The Family Man	Lillian	S1E10 "The Coach"
1991	Knots Landing	Owner	S12E21 "Upwardly Mobile"
1991	Seinfeld	Stella	S3E3 "The Pen"
1991	Blossom	Honey #1	S2E6 "To Tell the Truth"
1993–1997	The Nanny	Madam Moleska; Sarah	3 episodes. Credited as Maga Harout (sic) in some cases
1995	Body Language	Alice the Waitress	TV movie
1995	Saved by the Bell: The New Class	Dean Eagleton	S3E9 "Boundaries"
1995	Bless This House	Mrs. Lewis	S1E9 "Fish and Guests Stink After Three Days"
1995	The Crew	Hungarian Princess	S1E11 "Extremities"
1996	Night Stand with Dick Dietrick	Marta	S1E33 "Dream a Little Dream"
1997	The Burning Zone	Emma Helderman	S1E11 "Midnight of the Carrier"
1998	Caroline in the City	Contessa	S3E25 "Caroline and the Secret Bullfighter: Part 1"
2000–2002	Providence	Card Dealer; Mrs. Kolchak	S2E23 "Paradise Inn"; S4E12 "Shadow Play"
2001	That's Life	Mrs. Caminati	S1E15 "Mr. Wrong"
2001	For Your Love	Fay	S4E7 "The Wedding"
2001	The Song of the Lark	Gertrude Lehmann	Presented as a feature on Masterpiece Theatre
2002	The Agency	Uta	S1E20 "The Understudy"
2002	The Practice	Jan Jessel	S7E8 "Bad to Worse"
2002	Without a Trace	Connie	S1E10 "Midnight Sun"
2003	Six Feet Under	Anahid's Mother	S3E13 "I'm Sorry, I'm Lost"
2003	Rock Me Baby	Crandall's Mom	S1E4 "Shift Shaft"
2004	Complete Savages	Woman	S1E5 "Car Jack"
2004	Everybody Loves Raymond	Cousin Bella	S9E6 "Boys' Therapy"
2008	Raising the Bar	Mrs. Martha Delman	S1E10 "Shop Till You Drop"
2010	Fringe	Nana Staller	S2E14 "The Bishop Revival"
