= A Wake in Providence =

A Wake in Providence may refer to:

- A Wake in Providence (band), American deathcore band
- A Wake in Providence (film), American comedy film
