= Anything but Love =

American sitcom

- Genre: Sitcom
- Created by: Wendy Kout
- Developed by: Dennis Koenig; Peter Noah
- Starring: Richard Lewis; Jamie Lee Curtis; Richard Frank; Sandy Faison; Bruce Kirby; Louis Giambalvo; Holly Fulger; Ann Magnuson; Joseph Maher; Billy Van Zandt; Jane Milmore; Bruce Weitz
- Theme music composer: JD Souther
- Composer: Jeremy Lubbock
- Country of origin: United States
- Original language: English
- No. of seasons: 4
- No. of episodes: 56

Production
- Executive producers: Robert M. Myman; Wendy Kout; John Ritter
- Producers: Pamela Grant; Barbara Hall; Al Lowenstein; Sybil Adelman; Martin Sage
- Camera setup: Multi-camera
- Running time: 24 minutes
- Production companies: Lookout, Inc.; Adam Productions; 20th Television

Original release
- Network: ABC
- Release: March 7, 1989 – June 3, 1992

Anything but Love is an American sitcom that aired on ABC from March 7, 1989, to June 3, 1992, spanning four seasons and 56 episodes. The show stars Richard Lewis as Marty Gold and Jamie Lee Curtis as Hannah Miller, coworkers at a Chicago magazine with a mutual romantic attraction who struggle to keep their relationship strictly professional. The series, from creator Wendy Kout and developers Dennis Koenig and Peter Noah, was produced by Adam Productions (a company run by John Ritter, who recurred for five episodes) in association with 20th Television.

== Synopsis ==
=== First season ===
Chicago native Hannah Miller (Jamie Lee Curtis) returns to her hometown after quitting her teaching post out of state and breaking up with her long-term boyfriend. On the flight back, she meets Marty Gold (Richard Lewis), an eccentric magazine columnist for Chicago Monthly, a trendy publication with hard-hitting exposés and pop-culture pieces. Marty's fear of flying and frazzled nerves are calmed by Hannah, who then shares her story of change with him and her plans to launch a writing career upon returning home. It just so happens, according to Marty, that there is an opening at Chicago Monthly for a researcher, which Hannah jumps at. Once the two arrive home, Marty introduces Hannah to his boss, blustery magazine editor Norman Keil (Louis Giambalvo), who sees a lot in her and gives her a trial assignment—a 2,000-word article on "the tortilla wars: does Chicago prefer corn or flour?" for 9 o'clock the following morning. Hannah aces and delivers, becoming part of the team and coincidentally getting a desk opposite Marty's. It becomes clear that Marty got Hannah the job because he was instantly attracted to her. Still getting over her recent breakup, Hannah is not ready to consider anyone new yet, but feels a connection to Marty she cannot or does not want to consummate.

Others at Chicago Monthly detect hints of attraction between Hannah and Marty, but (early on at least) are generally more occupied with the sensational and outrageous stories to which the two were assigned. Jules Kramer (Richard Frank), affectionately known as "Julie", is Norman's fawning assistant, and Pamela Peyton-Finch (Sandy Faison) a glamorous, cutthroat writer. The stories shift between the easygoing (but sometimes frenetic) office camaraderie and Marty's and Hannah's personal lives. Hannah's gun-toting outdoorsman dad, Leo Miller (Bruce Kirby), is also a character.

With each passing episode, as the two banter and form a friendship as well as a working relationship, they come closer to realizing the potential for romance. They would have realized this sooner if they were not so distracted. Marty is tentatively dating a girl named Alice (guest star Wendie Malick) while Hannah's recent ex, Jack (guest star Robin Thomas), visits and turns out to be Marty's former college roommate. The reunion for the three is a bit strained. Finally, in the first-season finale, Alice dumps Marty, and Hannah, who is making strides in getting over Jack, accepts Marty's invitation to dinner—though both agree it is "not a date".

=== Second season ===
Anything but Love second-season cast. From left: Joseph Maher, Holly Fulger, Jamie Lee Curtis, Richard Frank, Richard Lewis, Ann Magnuson.

As the second season opened, there were new faces and adjustments in the series, along with further progress in Hannah and Marty's relationship. Each episode now began with a prologue scene in which Marty and Hannah had lunch at a diner while having a conversation which poked fun at life's trivial conventions (i.e., clothing styles, dating habits, etc.). A sneak preview of these segments aired in ABC network promos for the show in August 1989, advertising the show's return in its original Tuesday night time slot after a three-month break. The following month, Anything but Love moved to Wednesday nights at 9:30/8:30c.

In the season premiere, Hannah returned from vacation to find that the magazine had been taken over by new owners, becoming a weekly publication and being renamed the Chicago Weekly. Norman was replaced by a new editor, the ultra-hip Catherine Hughes (played by performance artist and former Bongwater member Ann Magnuson), who instantly promoted Hannah to writer. Pamela was also gone, and arriving in her place was English TV critic Brian Allquist (Joseph Maher), whose reviews became one of the more popular features of the Weekly, but not without its fair share of controversy. Harold and Kelly (as played by actor/playwrights Billy Van Zandt and Jane Milmore, who also served as story consultants on the show at this time) were other new staff members. For unexplained reasons, Jules's last name changed to Bennett; however, under the new ownership, he remained as editor's assistant.

Hannah and Marty were now fighting off a stronger sexual attraction, and their close calls with intimacy and courtship intensified, which resulted in hilarious and comedically challenging situations. To give Hannah an outlet in which she could sort out her feelings for Marty, and her love life in general, the producers added her long-time best friend, Robin Dulitski (Holly Fulger), who also acted as Hannah's landlord. Hannah and Robin had an in-joke running back from their teenage years, in which they pictured themselves married by their thirties to dashing brothers named Schmenkman. For fun, they both regularly called each other "Mrs. Schmenkman". Robin was truly rooting for a Hannah/Marty relationship; at one point, however, she started feeling herself drawn to Marty, which resulted in them sharing a brief kiss. Marty was not as interested in dating Robin as she was in him, so after a brief disappointment, Robin re-channeled her energy in helping Hannah realize her feelings for Marty. Various members of Marty's family began making further guest appearances, as the emphasis on the character's Jewish culture became more prominent. While the two danced around their attraction, they continued to date others from time to time. Later in the season, Marty introduces Hannah to his ex-fiancée at his family's seder, upon which Hannah feels that the two may still have feelings for each other.

Hannah and Catherine became something of soul sisters both in and out of the office as well, providing support to each other through many twists and turns. Their friendship became similar to that of Hannah and Robin's. At one point in the season, Catherine hires Robin briefly to write a column featuring her "every woman" views on current events and social issues. Catherine, who prided herself on being very avant-garde in her editorial command and all-knowing of the ins and outs of pop culture, was crushed when a close companion and legendary artist snubbed her of mention in his recently published diaries. Feeling the onset of a nervous breakdown, she temporarily left Marty in charge of the Weekly. Brian also faced his first major public criticism at the magazine in this episode, in which fans of the latest Star Squad movie (a fictional take on Star Trek) stormed down to the Weekly office to protest his scathing review. Fortunately for Brian and Marty, Catherine overcame her wounded pride and returned to work. Marty would get a chance to fill the editor's shoes again that season, when a troubleshooter from the Weekly's parent company arrived and decided to replace Catherine; again, Catherine's cutting-edge approach to journalism was underappreciated. Marty had to pull some clever blackmail in order to get her back. While Catherine in the end remained at the Weekly, it was Brian who ended up with a short stint. In the episode "The Days of Whine and.." (March 21, 1990), a woman shows up to threaten Brian after an unfavorable review of her husband's work caused him to die. The woman stalks Brian ruthlessly. It escalates to the point where, out of rage and his attempt to avoid her watching his every move, Brian smashes all the TV sets on display at Marshall Field's department store, and is sent to jail.

In the season finale, Hannah celebrates her 30th birthday, a time which celebrated many joys but also some emptiness and regret. After looking back at her complicated romantic life, she realizes that the one missing aspect of her existence is right under her nose—Marty. After a year's worth of dodging the obvious chemistry between them, Hannah comes forward and shares her true feelings with Marty. As it turns out, Marty was on the cusp of revealing the same.

=== Third season ===
Anything but Love was renewed for a third season in the spring of 1990, but was omitted from ABC's 1990 fall schedule. In the wake of a ratings fall the previous season, the producers had called for further retooling of the show. The third-season premiere was moved to February 6, 1991, and the season itself only consisted of ten episodes. The opening storyline picked up straight from where the second-season finale left off, with Marty and Hannah admitting that they were indeed in love with each other. The two reveled in their newfound joy, and agreed to take things slowly and uncommitted. However, such an event was not to be complete without a monkey wrench thrown in. The breakthrough development was compounded by the arrival of guest star John Ritter, who signed on for a three-episode story arc (which ABC aptly planned for February sweeps, and was heavily promoting in order to kickstart the series). Ritter played Patrick Serrau, a renowned photographer swept into town when the Weekly hired him to work on a special series. Hannah and Patrick become well acquainted, and when the two are required to work together on her piece for the project, their association quickly gets to be more casual than professional.

Marty catches on to Patrick's maneuverisms and spies on him and Hannah when they stop by his hotel suite. Hannah feels wooed by Patrick, but feels challenged by her standing love for Marty. Struggling to keep his composure, Marty lets Hannah know of his awareness of the whole situation, while Hannah decides to let her heart lead the way. Patrick and Hannah get intimate, and as their assignment progressed, Patrick asks Hannah to join him in West Africa—for both work and romance. After some consideration, Hannah says yes, and Marty is devastated. Rather than resort to drastic behavior, he nonchalantly challenges Patrick's views on many urban issues discussed in the magazine project, which bring out an arrogant, negative side of his personality. Hannah, who had seen these true colors appear at times through her partnership with Patrick, finally admitted to herself that he was not the right man to be with. She ultimately turned back to Marty as Patrick departed the country, and the two finally entered a committed relationship.

The couple fantasized how everyone in their life, who had constantly pondered "will they or won't they?" for nearly the last two years, would react to their dating. Once the word got out, everyone celebrated. The one person who was a little less keen on the idea was a new columnist at the office, Mike Urbanek (Bruce Weitz), who thought Marty and Hannah's tendency to avoid full-out romance was nothing but silly game playing. No-nonsense Mike, a good friend of Marty's, was only weary of the pairing as a result of the experiences he had after many years of marriage. Just as Hannah got from Robin, Marty got the male counterpart of advice from Mike, albeit from the point of view of a husband. All the significant "firsts" of Hannah and Marty's courtship were then chronicled—the first fight (which unfolded at work), the first bout of jealousy (Hannah's reeling when Marty has to accompany a swimsuit model to the Caribbean for an interview), etc.

=== Fourth season ===
The fourth season begins with Hannah feeling ill, and at a visit to the doctor's, is told that she may be experiencing signs of morning sickness. Hannah takes a home pregnancy test, which shows a positive result. Both Marty and Hannah are excited when they learn that they are expecting parents—yet unmarried ones. As both believed in a legal union before embarking on such a step, they decided to rush off and get married. However, in the eleventh hour, just a short while before the couple marched off to the hastily prepared ceremony, the doctor's office calls back to tell Hannah that the results of their in-house test are negative. Given that Hannah's supposed pregnancy symptoms have disappeared, she and Marty are convinced that the home test was a lie, and decide to call off the wedding.

The couple's relationship reaches enticing new heights, and the main plotline further became inventive. In one episode, a young staff writer/intern at the office causes Marty and Hannah to escape into a fantasy in which they met as children, and brought their relationship from juvenile puppy love to the present day. The series continued to draw much critical acclaim as a result of Curtis and Lewis' on-screen chemistry at this time. The bond of the cast as a whole was at its strongest as well, with more episodes centering on the escapades of the guys (Marty, Jules and Mike) as well as the "sisterhood" (Hannah, Robin and Catherine). Then, perhaps not to the surprise of fans, John Ritter returned in December 1991 to further the saga of Patrick Serrau for two more episodes. Patrick was back in Chicago when his photography went on exhibit at the local art museum. Showing no signs of his usual lecherous self, Patrick attempts to lure Hannah once again by digging up some discrediting facts about Marty. Before the end of the two-parter, Marty manages to outplay Patrick once more, who truly did not have a chance to get Hannah due to how committed they were. While "dashing" Patrick proved no threat to the love of Hannah and Marty, others around them began facing less stable relationships. In early 1992, it was revealed that Catherine had a husband in an open marriage, who showed up wanting a divorce when he found a new woman he wished to be exclusive with. Not long after, Mike begins to show emotional distance in his marriage, when he puts the moves on Robin while his wife leaves town for a week.

== Production run ==
Although the show was initially popular in its abbreviated first season, producers decided to make cast changes for the second in order to provide Curtis and Lewis with more flavorful supporting characters. While critics hailed the changes, ABC's moving the show to Wednesdays at 9:30/8:30c caused a large drop in the series' ratings. It was announced as the 9:00/8:00c show but the immediate success of Doogie Howser, M.D. caused ABC to flip the shows two weeks into the season. Since it was renewed as a mid-season replacement, the third season did not begin until February 1991. ABC kept the show in the same Wednesday time slot, and ramped up promotions with the advertising tagline "The All-New Anything but Love" (corresponding with the current cast changes and the opening three-episode arc with John Ritter). All of this stabilized audiences enough to grant the series a fourth season. In August 1991, Anything but Love was moved to the unusual time slot of Wednesday at 10/9c, as a part of an all-comedy block (The Hump) that was short-lived. Ratings slipped again, and the show returned to the Wednesday 9:30/8:30 slot in early November.

Unusually, the show was not canceled by the network. Instead, 20th Century Fox pulled the plug on the show in 1992, having calculated that the show would not get renewed for a fifth season and would be unprofitable in first-run syndication.

== Episodes ==
=== Series overview ===
Season	Episodes	Originally released		Rank	Rating
Season	Episodes	First released	Last released	Rank	Rating
1	6	March 7, 1989	April 11, 1989	10	19.0
2	22	September 27, 1989	March 28, 1990	48	11.8
3	11	February 6, 1991	May 15, 1991	N/A	N/A
4	17	September 25, 1991	June 3, 1992	62	9.7 (Tied with Perfect Strangers and Teech)

=== Season 1 (1989) ===
No. overall	No. in season	Title	Directed by	Written by	Original release date	Prod. code	U.S. viewers (millions)	Rating/share (households)
1	1	"Fear of Flying"	Michael Lessac	Dennis Koening & Wendy Kout	March 7, 1989	5Y01	33.6	22.6/34
2	2	"Deadline"	Michael Lessac	George Zateslo	March 14, 1989	5Y03	28.6	19.5/30
3	3	"Burning the Toad"	Michael Lessac	Sheree Guitar	March 21, 1989	5Y02	28.0	18.9/29
4	4	"Love and Death"	Michael Lessac	Judd Pillot & John Peaslee	March 28, 1989	5Y04	25.7	17.6/28
5	5	"Dorothy Dearest"	Michael Lessac	Barbara Hall	April 4, 1989	5Y05	24.8	17.1/26
6	6	"This Is Not a Date"	Michael Lessac	Wendy Kout, Dennis Koenig, and Barbara Hall	April 11, 1989	5Y06	25.3	18.2/28

=== Season 2 (1989–90) ===
No. overall	No. in season	Title	Directed by	Written by	Original release date	Prod. code	U.S. viewers (millions)
7	1	"Ch-Ch-Changes"	David Trainer	Dennis Koenig, Peter Noah, and Wendy Kout	September 27, 1989	6Y01	18.3
8	2	"Those Lips, Those Thais"	Michael Lessac	Dennis Koenig, Peter Noah, and Wendy Kout	October 4, 1989	6Y03	19.6
9	3	"It's My Party and I'll Schvitz If I Want To"	David Trainer	Dennis Koenig, Peter Noah, and Wendy Kout	October 11, 1989	6Y02	20.1
10	4	"Scared Straight"	Michael Lessac	Dennis Koenig, Peter Noah, and Wendy Kout	October 18, 1989	6Y04	20.0
11	5	"Mr. Mom"	Matthew Diamond	Dennis Koenig, Peter Noah, and Wendy Kout	October 25, 1989	6Y05	19.9
12	6	"Just the Facts, Ma'am"	Michael Lessac	Dennis Koenig, Peter Noah, and Wendy Kout	November 1, 1989	6Y07	18.2
13	7	"Bang You're Dead"	Michael Lessac	Dennis Koenig, Peter Noah, and Wendy Kout	November 8, 1989	6Y08	16.8
14	8	"Truth or Consequences"	Michael Lessac	Dennis Koenig, Peter Noah, and Wendy Kout	November 15, 1989	6Y10	15.6
15	9	"It's Better to Have Loved and Flossed"	Michael Lessac	Dennis Koenig, Peter Noah, and Wendy Kout	November 22, 1989	6Y09	15.5
16	10	"Hearts and Bones"	James Widdoes	Dennis Koenig, Peter Noah, and Wendy Kout	November 29, 1989	6Y11	18.0
17	11	"Woman on the Verge of a Nervous Breakdown"	James Widdoes	Janis Hirsch	December 6, 1989	6Y06	14.5
18	12	"Breast of Friends"	Michael Lessac	Martin Sage & Sybil Adelman	December 13, 1989	6Y12	19.5
19	13	"Hotel of the Damned"	Robert Berlinger	Bill Barol	January 10, 1990	6Y13	17.8
20	14	"All About Allison"	Michael Lessac	Bill Diamond & Michael Saltzman	January 17, 1990	6Y15	15.4
21	15	"Proof It All Night"	Robert Berlinger	Alan Kirschenbaum	January 24, 1990	6Y14	15.1
22	16	"Three Men on a Match"	Michael Lessac	Billy Van Zandt & Jane Milmore	February 7, 1990	6Y16	14.4
23	17	"Partying is Such Sweet Sorrow"	Michael Lessac	Janis Hirsch	February 14, 1990	6Y18	15.3
24	18	"The Icewoman Cometh"	Michael Lessac	Bruce Rasmussen	February 28, 1990	6Y17	16.4
25	19	"Hooray for Hollywood"	Michael Lessac	Bill Barol	March 7, 1990	6Y19	14.2
26	20	"Robin Q. Public"	Robert Berlinger	Bill Diamond & Michael Saltzman	March 14, 1990	6Y20	16.0
27	21	"The Days of Whine and..."	Robert Berlinger	Janis Hirsch	March 21, 1990	6Y21	14.4
28	22	"Thirty... Something"	Robert Berlinger	Peter Noah	March 28, 1990	6Y22	18.9

=== Season 3 (1991) ===
No. overall	No. in season	Title	Directed by	Written by	Original release date	Prod. code	U.S. viewers (millions)
29	1	"Say It Again, Han"	Robert Berlinger	Peter Noah	February 6, 1991	7X01	21.4
30	2	"Martus Interruptus"	Robert Berlinger	Janis Hirsch	February 13, 1991	7X02	19.2
31	3	"Hello...Mali"	Robert Berlinger	Billy Van Zandt & Jane Milmore	February 27, 1991	7X03	16.3
32	4	"Long Day's Journey Into..What"	Unknown	Unknown	March 13, 1991	7X04	17.9
33	5	"The Day After"	Unknown	Unknown	March 20, 1991	7X05	17.9
34	6	"The Torrid Zone"	Unknown	Unknown	March 27, 1991	7X08	17.8
35	7	"My New Best Friend"	Unknown	Unknown	April 1, 1991	7X06	12.4
36	8	"Adventures in Baby-sitting"	Unknown	Unknown	April 10, 1991	7X10	16.0
37	9	"Isn't It Romantic?"	Unknown	Unknown	April 17, 1991	7X09	17.2
38	10	"Scream a Little Scream"	Robert Berlinger	Bill Bryan	May 8, 1991	7X07	13.3
39	11	"Plot of Gold"	Unknown	Unknown	May 15, 1991	7X11	15.0

=== Season 4 (1991–92) ===
No. overall	No. in season	Title	Directed by	Written by	Original release date	Prod. code	U.S. viewers (millions)
40	1	"Enormous Changes at the Last Minute"	Unknown	Unknown	September 25, 1991	8X01	16.0
41	2	"I Feel a Cult Coming On"	Unknown	Unknown	October 2, 1991	8X04	12.5
42	3	"A Tale of Two Kiddies"	Unknown	Unknown	October 9, 1991	8X03	14.1
43	4	"'M' is for Many Things She Forgot She Gave Me"	Unknown	Unknown	October 16, 1991	8X02	13.0
44	5	"Gimme and 'O'"	Unknown	Unknown	October 23, 1991	8X05	10.8
45	6	"Training Film"	Robert Berlinger	Janis Hirsch	October 30, 1991	8X06	12.3
46	7	"First Lady Sings the Blues"	Unknown	Unknown	November 20, 1991	8X10	13.7
47	8	"Stop Me Before I...Again: Part 1"	Unknown	Unknown	December 4, 1991	8X07	14.2
48	9	"Stop Me Before I...Again: Part 2"	Unknown	Unknown	December 11, 1991	8X08	14.4
49	10	"Salmonella Is Coming to Town"	Unknown	Unknown	December 18, 1991	8X12	17.6
50	11	"The Call of the Mild"	Unknown	Unknown	January 8, 1992	8X09	14.7
51	12	"I'd Kill for a Mink"	Unknown	Unknown	January 15, 1992	8X11	14.7
52	13	"Catherine Honey, I'm Home"	Unknown	Unknown	January 22, 1992	8X13	12.2
53	14	"Angst for the Memories"	Unknown	Unknown	February 5, 1992	8X17	14.3
54	15	"Tryst and Shout"	Unknown	Unknown	February 12, 1992	8X14	11.1
55	16	"The Waiting"	Unknown	Unknown	May 27, 1992	8X16	14.1
56	17	"Marty Walks"	Unknown	Unknown	June 3, 1992	8X15	11.1

== Guest stars ==
Tia Carrere guest stars once as the now grown-up, Asian-born college student Marty had sponsored as a child. Carrere later played Lewis's girlfriend on several episodes of the 2007 season of Curb Your Enthusiasm, and co-starred with Curtis in True Lies.

== Theme music ==
The title track, which shared its name with the series, was a sentimental soft-rock song. In the first season, a main vocal track was used for the opening credits, dominated by woodwinds with a synth underscore, and was performed by JD Souther. The original opening sequence featured time-lapsed stills of Lewis and Curtis outdoors as the two "bonded".

Beginning in the second season and onward, the theme song was now instrumental during the title sequence, featuring an acoustic guitar and synthesizers performed in a higher key. The visuals were redesigned to feature still photos of Lewis and Curtis in a series of different poses, separately and together, with professional photo backgrounds behind them. These photos appeared in moving strips that traveled in all sorts of directions along a greenish-blue, textured wall. The title and credits were encased in metallic, multicolored boxes that traveled across the screen along with the photos; the font was a calligraphic type.

== Home media ==
On February 6, 2007, 20th Century Fox released Anything But Love- Volume 1, a 3-disc boxset featuring the first 28 episodes of the series on DVD in Region 1.

DVD name	Ep #	Release date
Volume 1	28	February 6, 2007
Volume 2	28	TBA
