= Gate Theatre (disambiguation) =

The Gate Theatre may refer to:

- Gate Theatre, a theatre in Dublin
- Gate Theatre (New York City), a former theatre in New York City
- Gate Theatre Studio, a former theatre in London
- Gate Theatre (London), a current theatre in London
