= Micole Mercurio =

American actress

- Born: March 10, 1938; Chicago, Illinois, U.S.
- Died: January 19, 2016 (aged 77); Santa Monica, California, U.S.
- Occupation: Actress
- Years active: 1980–2009
- Spouse: Albert James Armonda (divorced)
- Children: 4

Micole Diana Mercurio (March 10, 1938 – January 19, 2016) was an American film and television actress and artist. Her film credits included the roles of Rosemary Szabo in Flashdance in 1983, Mrs. Kelly in Gleaming the Cube in 1989, Momma Love in The Client in 1994, Midge Callaghan in While You Were Sleeping in 1995, as well as What Lies Beneath in 2000. Mercurio's television work included guest appearances and recurring roles on Night Court, Hill Street Blues, L.A. Law, Chicago Hope and FlashForward.

Mercurio was born in Chicago, Illinois, on March 10, 1938, to Michael Mercurio and Nancy Mercurio (born Vallo). She was married to Albert James Armonda with whom she had four children. The marriage ended in divorce. She died at her home in Santa Monica, California on January 19, 2016, at the age of 77.

== Filmography ==
=== Film ===
Micole Mercurio television credits
Year	Title	Role	Ref.
1980	Alligator	Joey's Mother	
1981	Circle of Power	Mrs. Gordon	
1982	Flashdance	Rosemary Szabo	
1985	Mask	Babe	
1985	Twice in a Lifetime	Betty	
1986	Bad Guys	Vick	
1986	Welcome to 18	Miss Bulah	
1988	Colors	Joan Hodges	
1988	War Party	Jay's Wife	
1989	Gleaming the Cube	Mrs. Kelly	
1989	How I Got into College	Betty Kailo	
1990	The Grifters	Waitress	
1990	Welcome Home, Roxy Carmichael	Louise Garweski	
1993	Warlock: The Armageddon	Kate (Uncredited)	
1993	The Thing Called Love	Mary	
1993	Wrestling Ernest Hemingway	Bernice	
1994	The Client	Momma Love	
1995	While You Were Sleeping	Midge Callaghan	
1996	2 Days in the Valley	Older Woman	
1997	Just in Time	Dotty Zacarelli	
1998	My Engagement Party	Becca Roth	
1999	A Wake in Providence	Aunt Elaine	
2000	What Lies Beneath	Mrs. Frank	
2001	Jack the Dog	Rose	
2001	Bandits	Sarah Fife	
2002	American Girl	Faye	
2004	Eulogy	Delilah The Neighbor	

=== Television ===
Micole Mercurio television credits
Year	Title	Role	Notes	Ref.
1982, 1987	Hill Street Blues	Ernie's Wife / Mrs. Moldonaldo / Sylvia Selson	3 episodes	
1985, 1987	Night Court	Phyllis / Ginger	1 episode	
1986	Blue de Ville	Vee Valentine	TV movie	
1987	Daddy	Ms. Lipton	TV movie	
1988	Baby Boom	Beryl	1 episode	
1989	L.A. Law	Mrs. Ferguson	1 episode	
1989	When He's Not a Stranger	Emily McKenna	TV movie	
1992	The Commish	Sheila Sorenson	1 episode	
1994	NYPD Blue	Mrs. McBride	1 episode	
1994	The X-Files	Mrs. Stodie	1 episode	
1995, 1996	Chicago Hope	Peggy Harrod	2 episodes	
1996	The Client	Naomi	1 episode	
1996	ER	Marguerite Janeway	1 episode	
1996	Norma Jean & Marilyn	Mozelle Hyde	TV movie	
1997	Tell Me No Secrets	Pearl Koster	TV movie	
1997	Promised Land	Eileen Bernhart	1 episode	
1997	The Practice	Gracie Kramer	1 episode	
1999	Safe Harbor	Merle	1 episode	
2002	CSI: Crime Scene Investigation	Isabelle Millander	1 episode	
2002–2004	The Guardian	Maureen Straka	3 episodes	
2006	Commander in Chief	Ilene Maxwell	1 episode	
2007	Claire	Bunny Holden	TV movie	
2009	FlashForward	Maureen	1 episode	
