= McGurk: A Dog's Life =

1979 television pilot created by Charlie Hauck

A Dog's Life is a 1979 television pilot created by Charlie Hauck for NBC and the last television concept developed by Norman Lear to become a pilot. The show starred Barney Martin, Beej Johnson, Charles Martin Smith and Sherry Lynn. Only one half-hour pilot episode was made of this offbeat costume comedy. It was shown only once on NBC on June 15, 1979 at 8:00 PM EST. The show featured the actors portraying the roles of the family dogs and wearing dog costumes. Lear's intention was to do an All in the Family-style show by using the dog's point of view to discuss controversial social and racial biases.

Peter J. Boyer of the Associated Press reviewed the pilot negatively, stating that "except for the dog suits, it's a formula sitcom with familiar subjects." In 2004, clips from the pilot were featured on an ABC special called The Best TV Shows That Never Were.

== Plot summary of pilot episode ==
"Curtains for McGurk"
McGurk is the old family dog whose life becomes complicated when his owners adopt a young, eager-to-please pup named Tucker. Iris is McGurk's love interest, while Camille is Iris's young pup who takes an instant liking to Tucker.

== Cast ==
- Barney Martin ... McGurk
- Beej Johnson... Iris
- Charles Martin Smith... Tucker
- Sherry Lynn ... Camille
- Michael Huddleston ... Turk
- Hamilton Camp ... Spike

== Production team ==
- Norman Lear ... Executive producer
- Peter Bonerz ... Director
- Charles Hauck ... Producer
- Ken Stump ... Associate producer
- Charles Hauck ... Writer

== Title song ==
The show's title song was "We're your dogs", and was sung and performed by the four principal cast members.

== Similar shows ==
- Dinosaurs
- Father of the Pride
