= John Means (comedian) =

American English instructor and comedian

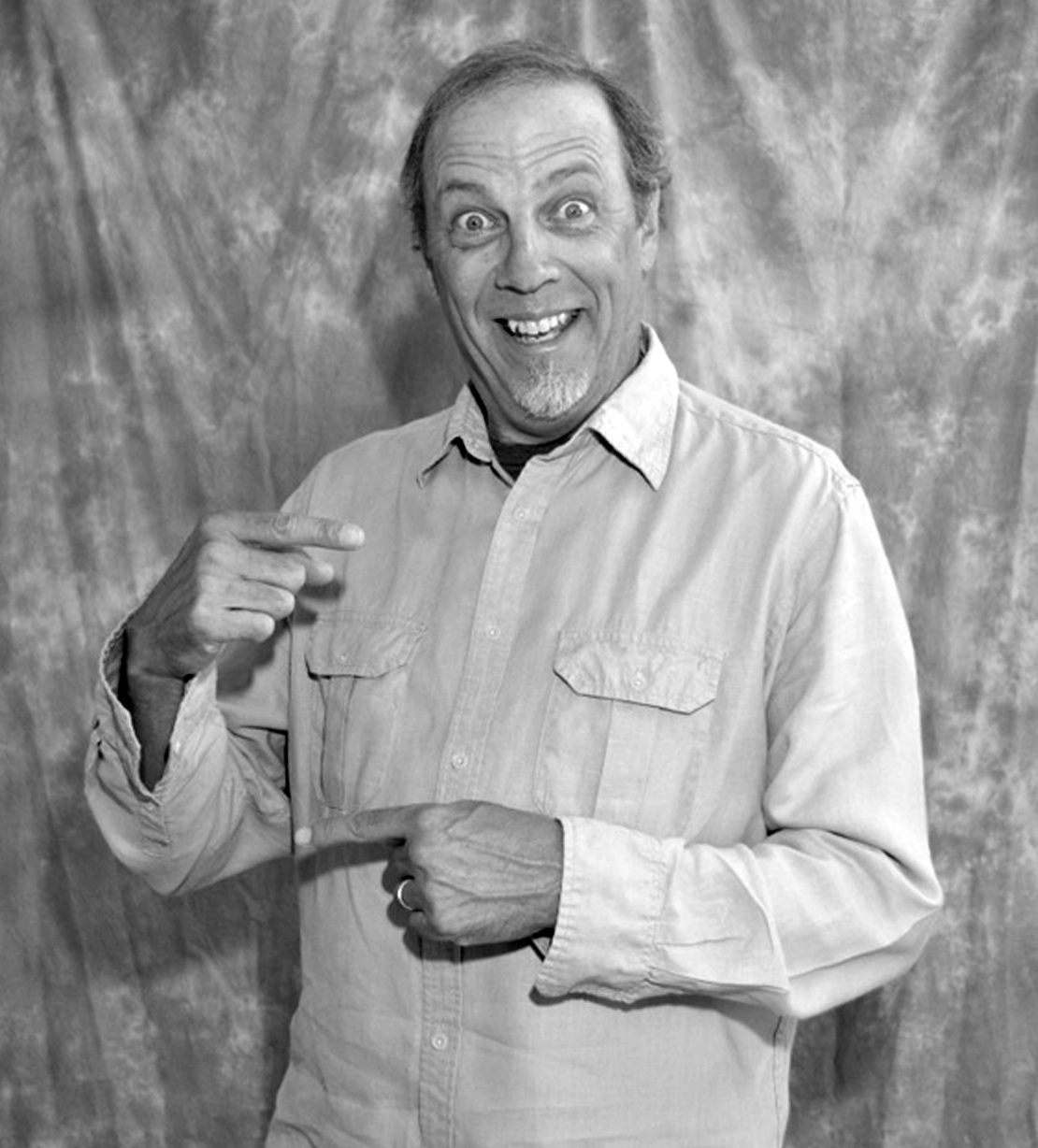
- John Means, 2011
- Born: United States
- Other names: Dr. Gonzo, Doc of Comedy Rock

Comedy career
- Medium: Stand-up comedy, television, parody music, music video
- Genres: Satire, observational comedy, parody

John Means is a former community college English instructor from Mason City, Illinois, who had gained fame in the 1980s as a stand-up comedian. Based out of San Francisco, he performed under the stage name "Dr. Gonzo." His act was a combination of standard observational humor and humorous songs, self-accompanied on electric guitar.

== Early life ==
Means was born in October 1955 in Mason City, Illinois. His father was Dr. Jack Means.

Means graduated from Mason City High School. He attended Lincoln College in Lincoln, Illinois and transferred to Drake University in Des Moines, Iowa, and earned a bachelor’s degree in fine arts in 1977.

== Career ==
In 1978, Means moved to San Francisco. He worked at an import company, a restaurant, and busked with his guitar at Fisherman’s Wharf. He began as an opening act for comics at The Boarding House.

The songs were generally parodies of popular tunes of the day; however, in contrast to contemporary musical parodists such as "Weird Al" Yankovic, whose songs are performed comically, Means' musical accompaniments were largely faithful to the original artists'. His musical sensibilities caught the attention of some of the popular musicians of the day, and he was soon performing on the same bills as Stevie Ray Vaughan, Los Lobos, and other straight musical acts.

In 1981, he came in fifth on the Showtime cable channel competition, The Big Laff Off. In 1987, he was a contestant on Star Search.

His most successful collaboration was with famed 1980s rock group, Huey Lewis and the News. He performed in several of their popular music videos, and traveled with them as the opening act on their 1984-1985 world tour. "Dr. Gonzo" can be seen on DVD on the 2 disc Back to the Future set in a special music video made for the movie, featuring "Doc Brown" Christopher Lloyd. By the mid-1980s, he was one of the most successful local acts in the San Francisco area. In 1989, he joined 45 other performers, including Los Lobos, Santana, Aaron Neville, and Crosby, Stills & Nash at a benefit concert in Watsonville, California for victims of the Loma Prieta earthquake.

He has also opened for such rock acts as Jefferson Starship, Marty Balin, The Greg Kihn Band and Missing Persons. In 1991, he opened for Joe Walsh.

== Retirement ==
By the early 1990s, the stand-up craze that had fueled the success of "Dr. Gonzo" had started to subside. He retired from performing in 1992 and moved back to Mason City, where he took a position as an English professor at a nearby college and served on the city council. In 1997, Means was elected to the city council and served for 8 years.

Means went back to school and received a bachelor’s degree in English from the University of Illinois Springfield in 2000 and taught English at his alma mater, Lincoln College.

In 2002, he opened two restaurants in Mason City with his wife Peggy: an Italian pizza and pasta house named "PJ’s Pizza & Pasta" and a steakhouse named "Jack & Jo's" after his parents. In 2012, the couple put the restaurants up for sale. He devotes his spare time to beautification projects in his hometown.
