= Barney Martin =

American actor (1923–2005)

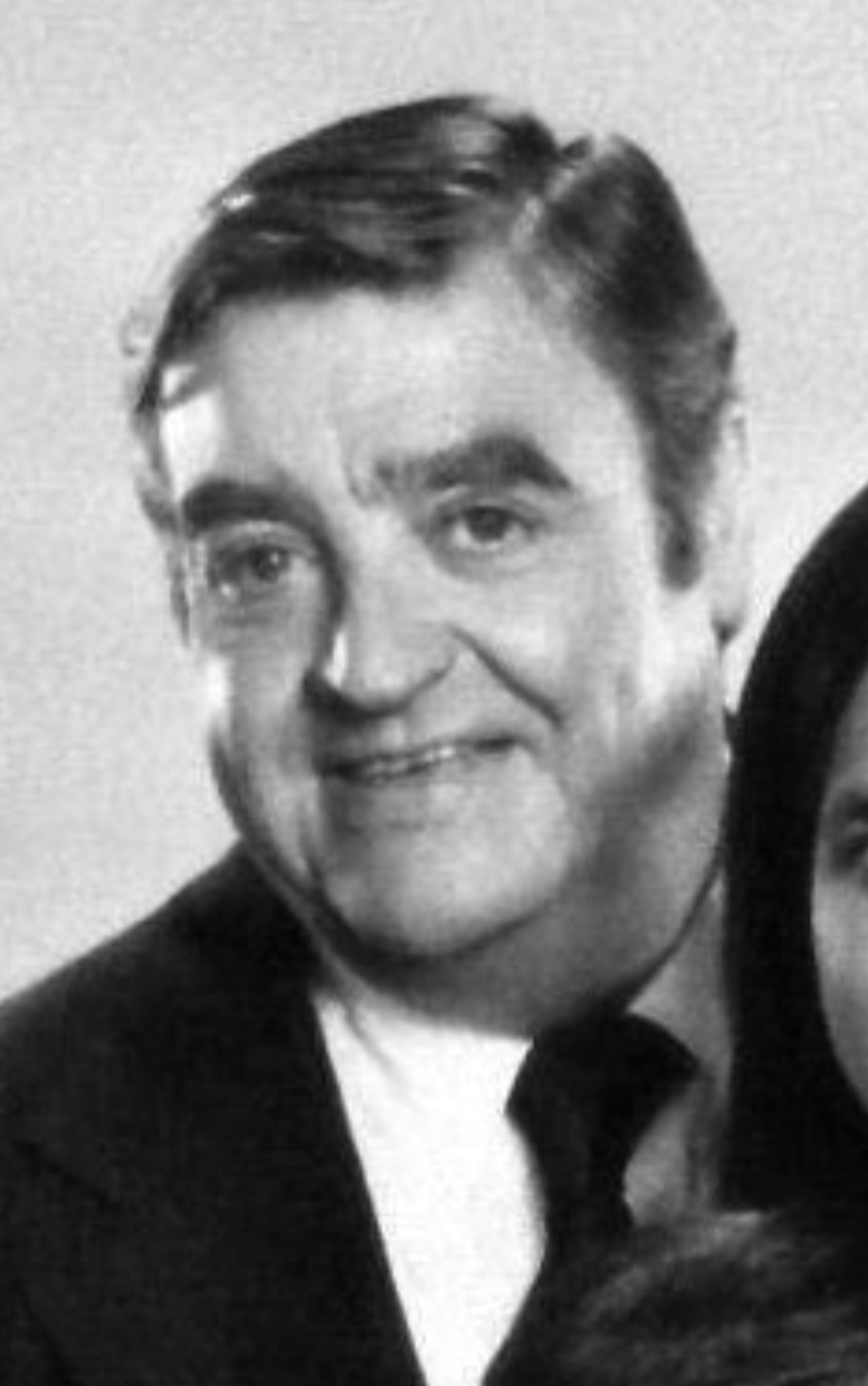
- Martin in The Tony Randall Show (1977)
- Born: March 3, 1923; New York City, U.S.
- Died: March 21, 2005 (aged 82); Los Angeles, California, U.S.
- Occupation: Actor
- Years active: 1956–2000

Barney Martin (March 3, 1923 – March 21, 2005) was an American actor, best known for playing Morty Seinfeld, father of Jerry, on the sitcom Seinfeld (1991–1998). He also played supporting roles in Mel Brooks's The Producers (1967), and the Dudley Moore comedy Arthur (1981). He originated the role of Amos Hart (Mr. Cellophane) in the 1976 Broadway production of Chicago.

== Early life ==
Barney Martin was born in New York City on March 3, 1923. He served in the U.S. Army Air Force as a navigator during the Second World War and worked as a NYPD officer for twenty years, working his way up to detective. He got his start as a comedian while still a police officer, providing deputy commissioners with humorous presentations.

Martin once commented that many Jewish Seinfeld fans told him how much his character reminded them of their fathers. Martin himself was from an Irish Catholic family.

== Career ==
Entering show business as a stand-in for Jackie Gleason in The Honeymooners in 1955–56 and as a part-time writer for Steve Allen in the 1950s, he was discovered by Mel Brooks, who cast him in The Producers.He also acted in Alfred Hitcock hour, season 3, Blood Bargain. The next year, he played the role of Hank in Charly. He went on to act in dozens of films, including the role of Liza Minnelli's unemployed father in the hit 1981 film Arthur and its 1988 sequel, Arthur 2: On the Rocks.

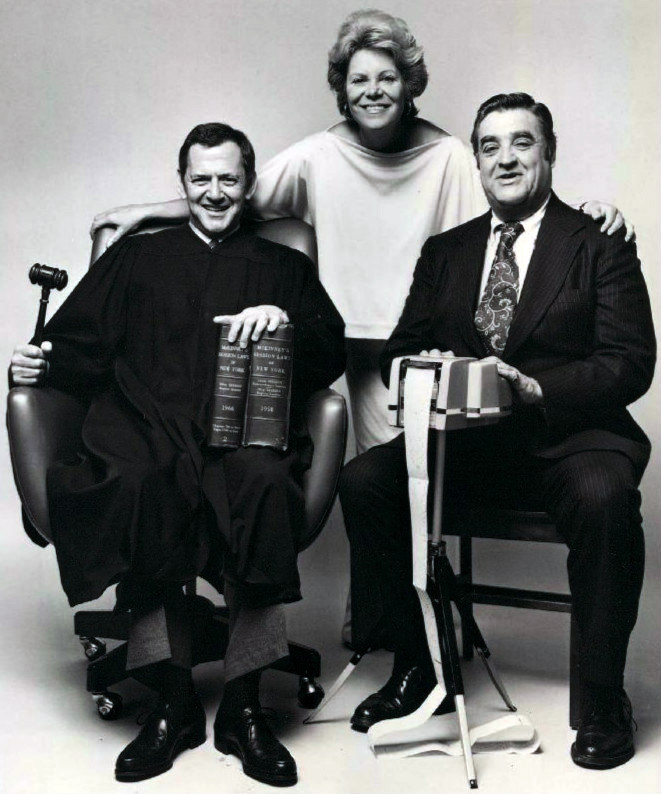
Martin with Tony Randall and Rachel Roberts in the Tony Randall Show in 1976

On television, he appeared in two episodes of The Odd Couple, once in a very early episode as an irate fellow juror infuriated with Felix Unger's pesty personality and four years later as a fellow subway train passenger. Shortly after, Martin co-starred with Tony Randall for two seasons in The Tony Randall Show as court reporter Jack Terwilliger. Throughout the run of this show, he had second billing only to Randall himself. In 1979, he was cast as the title character in Norman Lear's final TV series concept, McGurk: A Dog's Life. Martin was cast to play a character similar to Lear's earlier creation Archie Bunker, but this time as an anthropomorphic dog. Only the pilot was completed. In 1990, he co-starred with Valerie Bertinelli and Matthew Perry in the CBS sitcom Sydney. In 1987, he appeared in the pilot episode of 21 Jump Street as Johnny Depp's partner. In 1993, Martin played the recurring role of "Pete Peters" on the Don Rickles sitcom Daddy Dearest.

In 1975, Martin originated the role of Amos Hart in the Broadway musical Chicago, in which he introduced the song "Mr. Cellophane". He appeared in many more musicals during his career, most notably South Pacific, The Fantasticks, and How Now, Dow Jones. Much of Martin's work has been in television, where he had a long career as a character actor. He played a gangster called the "Cheese Man" in a Golden Girls episode. He played a love interest for Thelma Harper in the Hawaii episode of Mama's Family, and he played the father of Frank Fontana on Murphy Brown. He appeared in an episode of Full House as Ranger Roy, the host of a popular kids' TV show. In 1981, he portrayed Ralph Marolla, father of Liza Minnelli's character in the film Arthur and the following year appeared on Barney Miller in the episode "Obituary".

In 1991, Martin was cast as Morty Seinfeld, the father of Jerry Seinfeld's character on the sitcom Seinfeld. His first appearance was in Season 2's "The Pony Remark". Martin replaced Phil Bruns, who first portrayed the character in Season 1's "The Stake Out". Although he was the second actor to portray Jerry's dad on the show, he is the one most associated with the role, as Bruns appeared in only one episode. Martin took on the role upon showrunners Larry David and Jerry Seinfeld deciding they wanted the character of Morty Seinfeld to be harsher: they thought Bruns' version of the character was too laid-back. Martin retained this role through the end of the series in 1998.

== Death ==
Martin died of bladder cancer on March 21, 2005, in Studio City, Los Angeles, California, at age 82. He was cremated, and his ashes were returned to his family.

== Filmography ==
=== Film ===
Year	Title	Role	Notes
1956	The Wrong Man	Juror	Uncredited
1959	Odds Against Tomorrow	Car Accident Driver	Uncredited
1961	The Young Doctors	Bus Driver	Uncredited
1963	Love with the Proper Stranger	Sidney	Uncredited
1967	The Producers	Goring	
1968	Charly	Hank	
1970	Lola	Doorman, Efficient but Fat	
1978	Movie Movie	Motorcycle Cop	(segment "Baxter's Beauties of 1933")
1979	Hot Stuff	Kiley	
1981	Arthur	Ralph Marolla	
1988	Arthur 2: On the Rocks	Ralph Marolla	
1989	Deadly Weapon	Mayor Bigelow	
1992	Hero	Court Official	Uncredited

=== Television ===
Year	Title	Role	Notes
1955	The Phil Silvers Show	Police Officer	Episode: "The Boxer"
1957	To Tell the Truth	Imposter Portraying Jack Bothwell (Freckles from "Our Gang")	Episode: Aired Nov 26, 1957
1958	I've Got A Secret	Himself, a contestant in a laughing competition	Episode: Aired April 2, 1958
1961	Naked City	Bartender	Episode: "Landscape with Dead Figures"
1963	The Alfred Hitchcock Hour	Rupert Harney	Episode: "Blood Bargain"
1963	Car 54, Where Are You?	Friar Charlie Donovan	Episode: "See you at the Bar Mitzvah"
1964	The Patty Duke Show	Mr. McDonald	2 episodes
1965	For the People	Bartender	Episode: "Any Benevolent Purpose"
1970–74	The Odd Couple	Man #3 / Mr. Moss	2 episodes
1976–78	The Tony Randall Show	Jack Terwillinger	38 episodes
1978	Happy Days	G.W. Burch	Episode: "Fonzie for the Defense"
1979	Mrs. Columbo	Dr. Prinz	Episode: "Word Games"
1980	Hart to Hart	Reverend Tyson	Episode: "Night Horrors"
1980	Here's Boomer	Lew	Episode: "Me and My Shadow"
1982	Barney Miller	Wendell R. Bergendahl	Episode: "Obituary"
1982	Cagney & Lacey	Sully	Episode: "Pop Used to Work Chinatown"
1982	One of the Boys	Big Julie	2 episodes
1982	Cassie & Co.	J.T. McClane	Episode: "There Went the Bride"
1982	CHiPs	Ed	Episode: "Speedway Fever"
1982	Archie Bunker's Place	Mr. Pulaski	Episode: "Archie Gets a Head"
1982	Benson	Frank Cooper	2 episodes
1983–86	Trapper John, M.D.	Fella / Herbert Mitchell	2 episodes
1983	At Ease	Col. Whatley	Episode: "The Ballad of Lucinda Ballard"
1983	Zorro and Son	Napa / Sonoma	5 episodes
1983	Small & Frye	Pops Malloy	Episode: "Schlockty Too"
1983	Hill Street Blues	Ben Seltzer	2 episodes
1984	Night Court	Bum	Episode: "The Former Harry Stone"
1984	St. Elsewhere	Mr. Duffy	2 episodes
1985	The Twilight Zone	Marty	Episode: "Dealer's Choice"
1985	Diff'rent Strokes	Bill Perkins	Episode: "Blue Collar Drummond"
1985	Scarecrow and Mrs. King	Marvin Metz	Episode: "Fast Food for Thought"
1986	Highway to Heaven	Barney	Episode: "A Night to Remember"
1986	Punky Brewster	Dr. Evans	2 episodes
1986	You Again?	Gus	Episode: "The Strike"
1986	Hotel	John Patterson	Episode: "Hornet's Nest"
1986	Kids Incorporated	Mr. Angel	Episode: "With a Twinkle in His Eye"
1987	One Big Family	Phil	Episode: "Jake the Beachcomber"
1987	What a Country!	Charlie Garver	Episode: "The Apartment"
1987	21 Jump Street	Edison Coulter / Charlie Donegan	2 episodes
1987–89	Murder, She Wrote	Lieutenant Timothy Hanratty	2 episodes
1988	The Oldest Rookie	Heindorf	Episode: "Yessir, That's My Baby"
1988	Mama's Family	Billy Field	Episodes: "Mama Goes Hawaiian Parts 1 & 2"
1989	Pucker Up and Bark Like a Dog	Rudy Phillips	Television movie
1990	Sydney	Ray	13 episodes
1990–1991	Murphy Brown	Frank's Father / Dominic Fontana	2 episodes
1991	Full House	Ranger Roy	Episode: "The Legend of Ranger Joe"
1991	The Golden Girls	Karl "Cheeseman" Moran	Episode: "Witness"
1991–92	Life Goes On	Stan Baker	5 episodes
1991–98	Seinfeld	Morty Seinfeld	20 episodes
1992	Sisters	Walt Whitsig	Episode: "Teach Your Children Well"
1992	Major Dad	Stanley	Episode: "Close Encounters"
1993	Daddy Dearest	Pete Peters	13 episodes
1993	The Wonder Years	Old Kevin	Episode: "Poker"
1995	Aaahh!!! Real Monsters	Archie (voice)	Episode: "Mayberry UFO"
1996	The Wayans Bros.	Santa	Episode: "Psycho Santa"
1997	George and Leo	The Martian	Episode: "The Halloween Show"
1998	Promised Land	Sam Perryman	Episode: "Undercover Granny"
2000–01	Buzz Lightyear of Star Command	Ambassador Major	Voice; 2 episodes
2000	Noah Knows Best		Episode: "Lost Night"
2005	Center of the Universe	Maury	Episode: "The Break In"

== Theatre ==
Year	Title	Role	Notes
1962	All American	Various roles	Winter Garden Theatre, Broadway
1967	How Now, Dow Jones	Bradbury	Lunt-Fontanne Theater, Broadway
1970	Promises, Promises	Jesse Vanderhof	US national tour
1971	Promises, Promises	Dr. Dreyfuss	US national tour
1974	All Over Town	Detective Peterson	Booth Theatre, Broadway
1975	Chicago	Amos Hart	46th Street Theatre, Broadway
1978	The Music Man	Marcellus Washburn	Starlight Musicals, Indiana
1980	The Roast	Sid Ball	Winter Garden Theatre, Broadway
1985	First Time Anywhere!	P.T. Barnum	Candlewood Playhouse, Connecticut
1986	Hello, Dolly!	Horace Vandergelder	Pittsburgh Civic Light Opera
1989	A Funny Thing Happened on the Way to the Forum	Senex	California Music Theatre, Los Angeles
1990	Clothespins and Dreams	Mr. Morganstern	California Music Theatre, Los Angeles
1992	Chicago	Amos Hart	Long Beach Civic Light Opera, Los Angeles
1994	Lunch	Bum	US national tour
