= The Big Laff Off =

1978 American stand-up comedy show

- Genre: Talent contest; Stand-up comedy competition
- Created by: Larry Sulkis
- Directed by: Marc Payton
- Country of origin: United States
- Original language: English

Production
- Running time: 52 minutes

Original release
- Network: Showtime
- Release: 1978

The Big Laff Off is an American stand-up comedy competition show that debuted on the cable network Showtime in 1978.

The series features comedians Eddie Murphy, Rick Overton, Mark Schiff, Steve Mittleman, Carol Leifer, Harry Anderson, Ronn Lucas, Billy Crystal, Robin Williams, Ellen DeGeneres, Sinbad, Dana Carvey, Sandra Bernhard, and Bobby Slayton.

On April 2, 1979, Tommy Smothers hosted The Big Laff Off finals of 1979 at The Bottom Line club. First prize was two thousand dollars and appearances at the Reno Sweeny club and on Don Kirshner's Rock Concert television variety show. Finalists were seen by major talent agents and on video by staff of The Tonight Show

After winning The Big Laff Off, comedian Steve Mittleman went from not working to being a headliner performer.

In 1981, comedian Dr. Gonzo came in fifth on The Big Laff Off.
