= Billy Van Zandt =

American playwright and actor

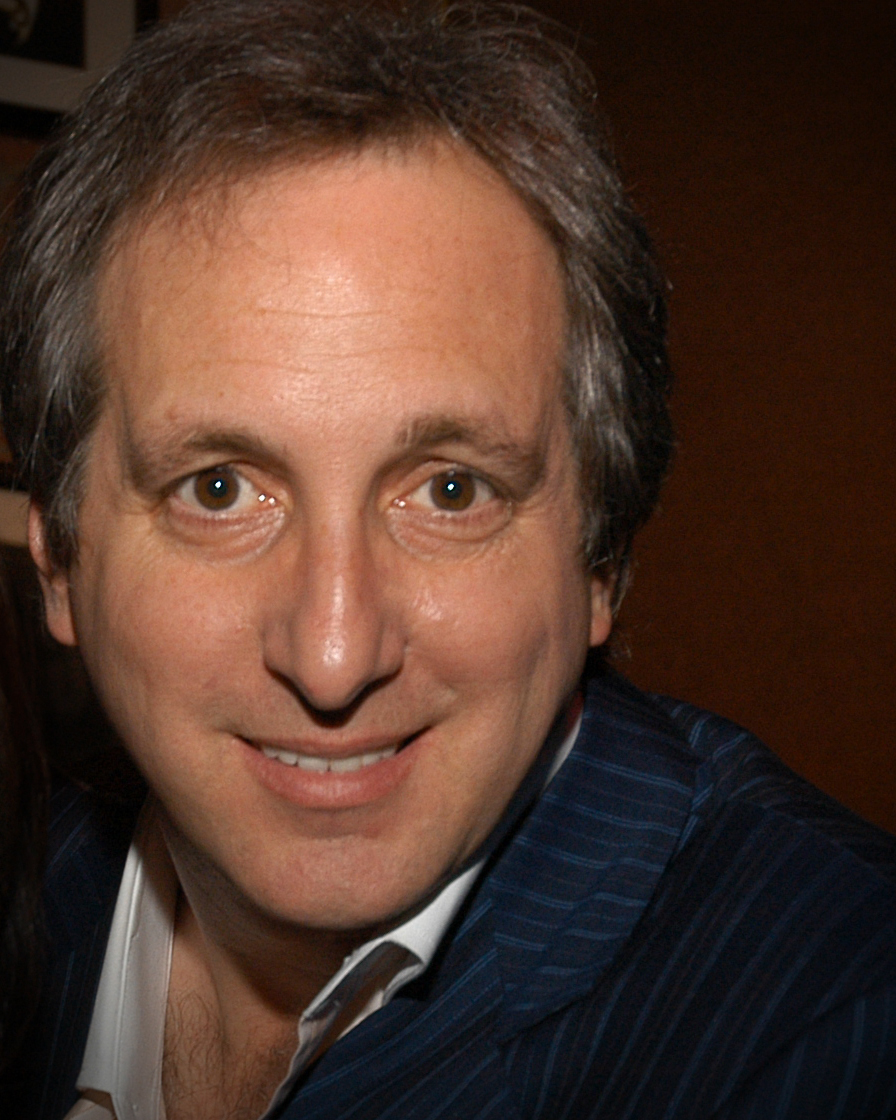
- Van Zandt in 2006
- Born: William Van Zandt; December 13, 1957 (age 68); Red Bank, New Jersey, U.S.
- Occupations: Playwright; actor; author
- Years active: 1975–present
- Spouses: Adrienne Barbeau (m. 1992; div. 2018) Teresa Ganzel (m. 2021)
- Children: 2
- Relatives: Steven Van Zandt (half-brother)
- Website: vanzandtmilmore.com

William Van Zandt (born December 13, 1957) is an American playwright, actor, and author. He is the author of the theatrical memoir Because It's Funny! and the TV memoir Get in the Car, Jane!: Adventures in the TV Wasteland.

== Early life ==
Van Zandt was born in Red Bank, New Jersey, to Mary H. Lento and William Brewster Van Zandt. He is of Dutch descent through his father, and Italian (Naples) descent through his mother. He grew up in Middletown Township, New Jersey.

== Career ==
Van Zandt is the co-author and star of the Off-Broadway plays You've Got Hate Mail, Silent Laughter, Drop Dead!, The Boomer Boys Musical, and 21 other theatrical plays written with Jane Milmore, including A Night at the Nutcracker, Wrong Window, and summer stock perennial Love, Sex, and the I.R.S. Billy also wrote The Property Known as Garland for Adrienne Barbeau, which ran off-Broadway at the Actor's Playhouse in 2006.

Van Zandt was nominated for an Emmy Award for his television special I Love Lucy: The Very First Show, and won People's Choice and NAACP Image Awards for his work on the Martin Lawrence comedy Martin and a Prism Multi-Cultural Award for his work on TV's The Hughleys.

Along with partner Jane Milmore, he assisted with the development of television's The Wayans Bros. for Shawn Wayans and Marlon Wayans, Suddenly Susan for Brooke Shields, Bless This House for Andrew Dice Clay, and Daddy Dearest for Don Rickles and Richard Lewis.

Other film roles include Bob, one of the sailing teenagers, in Jaws 2 (1978), an alien Starfleet ensign in Star Trek: The Motion Picture (1979), a military school cadet in the 1981 film Taps and a mobster wannabe in the 1999 film A Wake in Providence which he also co-wrote.

On television, he was a regular cast member on the second season of ABC's Anything but Love. He was writer and guest star in the 1990 Valerie Bertinelli series Sydney. He did a cameo as Groucho Marx on The Marvelous Mrs. Maisel, and played recurring roles as Funky Old Joe on Nickelodeon's That Girl Lay Lay, and Jerry the Dentist on American Dad.

He toured in the Off-Broadway hit You've Got Hate Mail which ran at the Triad Theater from 2010 to 2015, and as of 2025 tours in his play The Boomer Boys Musical.

== Personal life ==
Van Zandt is the half-brother of musician-actor Steven Van Zandt and brother-in-law of his wife, actress Maureen Van Zandt.

Van Zandt married actress Adrienne Barbeau on December 31, 1992. The couple met in 1991 during the West Coast premiere of his play Drop Dead!. They divorced in 2018. They have twin sons.

Two years after his marriage ended, Billy and actress Teresa Ganzel met during his Off-Broadway play You've Got Hate Mail and have been together ever since. They announced their engagement over Christmas 2020 and married September 12, 2021.

On April 26, 2024, Van Zandt was honored by having the street his family lived on named in his honor, becoming "Van Zandt Way."

== Full-length plays ==
- Love, Sex, and the I.R.S.
- Suitehearts
- Lie, Cheat, and Genuflect
- Having a Wonderful Time, Wish You Were Her
- Playing Doctor
- A Little Quickie
- Drop Dead!
- Bathroom Humor
- Infidelities
- The Senator Wore Pantyhose
- Till Death Do Us Part
- Do Not Disturb
- What the Bellhop Saw
- Merrily We Dance and Sing
- What the Rabbi Saw
- Confessions of a Dirty Blonde
- Silent Laughter
- The Pennies
- The Property Known as Garland
- A Night at the Nutcracker
- You've Got Hate Mail
- Wrong Window
- High School Reunion: The Musical
- The Boomer Boys Musical

== Television ==
- Life with Lucy (as Delivery Guy)
- Newhart
- Anything But Love (series regular as Harold; Exec Story Consultant)
- Nurses (Supervising Producer)
- I Love Lucy: The Very First Show (Primetime Emmy nomination)
- Sydney (Creative Consultant; guest-starred as Father Van Zandt)
- Martin (People's Choice Award, NAACP Image Award) (Co-Executive Producer; guest-starred as Jeffrey/White Couple)
- Daddy Dearest (created by) (Executive Producer; guest-starred as Maitre'D)
- The Wayans Bros. (developed by) (Executive Producer)
- Staten Island 10309 (unaired pilot; created by) (Executive Producer)
- Bless This House (Executive Producer)
- Suddenly Susan (developed original pilot)
- Yes, Dear (Consulting Producer)
- The Hughleys (Multi-Cultural Image Award, NAACP Image Award nomination) (Consulting Producer; guest-starred as Bartender)
- Center of the Universe (Consulting Producer)
- Jack and Janet Save the Planet (unaired pilot; created by) (Executive Producer)
- American Dad! (guest-starred as Jerry the dentist in multiple episodes)
- That Girl Lay Lay (guest-starred as Funky Old Joe; episodes "That Dude Dylan" and "Toothaches and CHOFMA Breaks")
- The Marvelous Mrs. Maisel (guest-starred as Groucho Marx; episode "Everything is Bellmore")

== Film ==
- Jaws 2 (1978, actor only) - Bob Burnsides
- Star Trek: The Motion Picture (1979, actor only) - Alien Ensign
- Skag (1979, actor only)
- Taps (1981, actor only) - Bug
- A Wake in Providence (1999, co-author) - Louie
- Stevie Van Zandt: Disciple (2024) - as himself
