= Daddy Dearest (American TV series) =

American television sitcom

- Created by: Billy Van Zandt; Jane Milmore; Richard Dmitri; Richard Lewis
- Starring: Don Rickles; Richard Lewis; Renée Taylor; Barney Martin
- Composer: Ed Alton
- Country of origin: United States
- Original language: English
- No. of seasons: 1
- No. of episodes: 11 (1 unaired)

Production
- Executive producers: Billy Van Zandt; Jane Milmore; Howard Klein
- Camera setup: Multi-camera
- Running time: 30 minutes
- Production companies: Van Zandt/Milmore Productions; 3 Arts Entertainment; HBO Independent Productions

Original release
- Network: Fox
- Release: September 5 – December 5, 1993

Daddy Dearest is an American television sitcom that aired on Fox, on Sunday nights at 9:30 p.m. from September 5 to November 7, 1993, with one additional episode on December 5th.

== Synopsis ==
The series revolved around Dr. Steven Mitchell, a psychologist who lived in Manhattan with his young son and, despite his constant insults and put downs, his father Al (Don Rickles), an obnoxious used car salesman who was recently separated from his wife Helen (Renée Taylor).

== Cast ==
- Richard Lewis as Dr. Steven Mitchell
- Don Rickles as Al Mitchell
- Renée Taylor as Helen Mitchell
- Sydney Walsh as Christine Winters
- Alice Carter as Lisa
- Carey Eidel as Larry Mitchell
- Jeffrey Bomberger as Danny Mitchell
- Jonathan Gibby as Danny Mitchell (pilot)
- Barney Martin as Pete Peter

== Episodes ==
No.	Title	Directed by	Written by	Original release date
1	"Pilot"	Linda Day	Billy Van Zandt & Jane Milmore	September 5, 1993
2	"Raging Bully"	Howard Storm	Mike Barker & Matthew Weitzman	September 12, 1993
3	"Private Lives"	David Steinberg	Richard Vaczy & Tracy Gamble	September 19, 1993
4	"Al vs. DMV"	Howard Storm	Bob Underwood	September 26, 1993
5	"You Bet Your Life"	Howard Storm	Howard Bendetson & Terrie Collins	October 3, 1993
6	"Mother Love"	Howard Storm	Billy Van Zandt & Jane Milmore	October 10, 1993
7	"Mount St. Helen's"	David Steinberg	Billy Van Zandt & Jane Milmore	October 17, 1993
8	"The Tortoise and the Scare"	Linda Day	S : Brent Forrester; S/T : Mike Barker & Matthew Weitzman	October 24, 1993
9	"American We"	Howard Storm	Billy Van Zandt & Jane Milmore	November 7, 1993
10	"Thanks, But No Thanks"	John Bowab	Michael Curtis & Gregory S. Malins	December 5, 1993
11	"Offensive Care"	N/A	N/A	Unaired
