= Richard Frank (actor) =

American actor

- Born: Richard Edward Frank; January 4, 1953; Boston, Massachusetts, U.S.
- Died: August 27, 1995 (aged 42); Los Angeles, California, U.S.
- Burial place: Sharon Memorial Park; Sharon, Massachusetts
- Occupation: Actor
- Years active: 1975–1995

Richard Edward Frank (January 4, 1953 – August 27, 1995) was an American actor. He was perhaps best known as Father Vogler in the 1984 movie Amadeus. Frank had numerous guest appearances in television shows, with a regular role in the sitcom Anything but Love.

== Biography ==
Born in Boston, Frank was a graduate of Juilliard's acting school. In addition, Frank appeared in numerous theater productions, including Hang on to Me at the Guthrie Theater, directed by Peter Sellars, as well as many productions in Los Angeles, mostly at the Taper. He created the Struggling Actor's Coloring Book and dozens of paintings, which are now in private collections. He was noted by colleagues for his intelligence and endless wit.

Frank played infamous lawyer and informal powerbroker Roy Cohn in the first performance of Tony Kushner's play Angels in America. Cohn also died from AIDS-related complications.

By 1993, Frank had already gone public with his affliction with AIDS. In the wake of his public disclosure, Frank was asked to guest-star in the fourth season Life Goes On episode "Bedfellows". Frank played Chester, the hospital roommate of Jesse McKenna (Chad Lowe), while both were admitted for illnesses related to their AIDS statuses. Chester has a more advanced stage of AIDS, and is not expected to live much longer; Jesse has to convince Chester at one point not to take his life by jumping off the hospital roof. Chester does lose his battle with AIDS before the episode's end, but not before passing on wisdom to Jesse for his own dealings with his illness.

Following his landmark appearance on Life Goes On, Frank's health began a gradual decline, but throughout 1994, he kept up his steady guest turns on series ranging from The Larry Sanders Show to Matlock. His final role was playing a director in a 1995 episode of Mad About You.

== Death ==
On August 27, 1995, Frank died in Los Angeles of complications from AIDS.

== Filmography ==
Richard Frank film and television credits
Year	Title	Role	Notes
1981	Ninguem	Ninguem	Film
1982	The Wall	Stefan Mazor	TV movie
1984	Amadeus	Father Vogler	Film
1985	Remington Steele	Scott Jefferson	Episode: "Steele of Approval"
1985	Stir Crazy	Jess Morgan	Episode: "Welcome to the Tribe"
1985	Cagney & Lacey	Eli Leavitt	Episode: "The Psychic"
1985	The Equalizer	1st Client	Episode: "Mama's Boy"
1986	Falcon Crest	Mr. Bloom	2 Episodes: "Double Jeopardy" & "Perilous Charm"
1987	Cracked Up	Resident Doctor	TV movie
1987	Max Headroom	Biller	Episode: "Whacketts"
1987	Night Court	Gary Fenton	2 Episodes: "Her Honor", Parts 3 & 4
1987	Perfect Strangers	Frank Peterson	Episode: "The Break-In"
1988	Valerie	Mr. Standish	Episode: "Close Encounters"
1990	Baby Brown	FBI Agent #2	Film
1990	Room for Romance		Episode: "A Midsummer Night's Reality"
1989–1992	Anything But Love	Jules Bennett	56 episodes
1992	The Jackie Thomas Show	Otto	Episode: "Jack & the Bean Stalker"
1992	Sisters	Marcus DeWitt	Episode: "Accidents Will Happen"
1993	The Larry Sanders Show	Thomas	Episode: "Larry Loses Interest"
1993	Life Goes On	Chester	Episode: "Bedfellows"
1994	Matlock	Wally McDaniel	Episode: "The Crook"
1994	The Sinbad Show		Episode: "David Goes Skiing"
1995	Mad About You	Director	Episode: "Just My Dog"
