= Vincent Pagano =

American actor and screenwriter

Vincent Pagano (born October 13, 1967 in Providence, Rhode Island) is an American film and television actor and screenwriter.

Pagano's first recurring television role was on the NBC sitcom Suddenly Susan in 1996.

Pagano wrote, produced and starred in two movies, both set in his native Rhode Island: the 1999 release A Wake in Providence and the 2006 release Jesus, Mary and Joey (titled Welcome Back, Miss Mary for cable television).

Sabrina, the Teenage Witch star Melissa Joan Hart told the Providence Journal she took a role in Jesus, Mary and Joey/Welcome Back, Miss Mary because her roommate, Angelo Spizzirri, was a close friend of Pagano.
