= Steve Mittleman =

American stand-up comedian (born 20th century)

- Born: 20th century United States

Comedy career
- Medium: Stand-up comedy, television, film
- Subjects: Observational comedy, satire, clean comedy

Steve Mittleman (born 20th century) is an American stand-up comedian and actor that has appeared in films, including Roxanne (1987) with Steve Martin and Woody Allen's Radio Days (1987).

Mittleman has had over one hundred television appearances on programs, including Late Night with David Letterman, The Tonight Show and sitcoms, including Mad About You.

After winning first place in The Big Laff Off stand-up comedy competition on Showtime, Mittleman went from not being to land a job to working as a headliner.

== Early life ==
Mittleman grew up in Queens, New York, where as a youth he played baseball and watched the New York Mets play every chance he got.

== Critical reception ==
In 1989, the Los Angeles Times wrote "On stage and off, comedian Steve Mittleman is the epitome of understatement, which belies the ambition and career drive that have given him, at 33, numerous impressive credits and may propel him to even loftier career heights." Adding, "His list of credits is as long as Kareem’s arm."
