= A Wake in Providence (film) =

- Directed by: Rosario Roveto Jr.
- Written by: Billy Van Zandt; Jane Milmore; Vincent Pagano; Michael Pagano
- Produced by: Patrick Coppola; Vincent Pagano; William Redner; Rosario Roveto Jr.
- Starring: Vincent Pagano; Victoria Rowell; Mike Pagano; Adrienne Barbeau; Micole Mercurio; Louis Guss; Magda Harout; John Mariano; John Capodice; Mark DeCarlo; Lisa Raggio; Dan Lauria
- Cinematography: Mark Kohl
- Edited by: Gareth O'Neil
- Music by: Ed Alton
- Production companies: Mister P. Productions; Gladiator Pictures
- Distributed by: Indican Pictures
- Release date: 1999
- Running time: 92 minutes
- Country: United States
- Language: English

A Wake in Providence (also titled Almost Married) is a 1999 American independent comedy film that is the directorial debut of Rosario Roveto Jr. It stars Vincent Pagano, who also co-wrote the screenplay, and Victoria Rowell.

== Premise ==
When Anthony's African-American girlfriend Alissa meets his Italian-American family at his grandfather's funeral, confrontations, confessions, and a hilarious race to the altar ensue!

== Cast ==
- Vincent Pagano as Anthony
- Victoria Rowell as Alissa
- Mike Pagano as Frankie
- Adrienne Barbeau as Aunt Lidia
- Micole Mercurio as Aunt Elaine
- Lisa Raggio as Claudia
- Dan Lauria as Rudy
- Kaye Kingston as Gram Baldassarre
- Louis Guss as Uncle Guy
- Sam Coppola as Uncle Joe
- John Capodice as Uncle Sal
- Mark DeCarlo as Vinnie
- Jane Milmore as Patty
- John Mariano as Brunie
- Billy Van Zandt as Louie
- Magda Harout as Aunt Alma
