= Gate Theatre (New York City) =

Former Off-Broadway theatre

Coordinates: 40.72993°N 73.98658°W

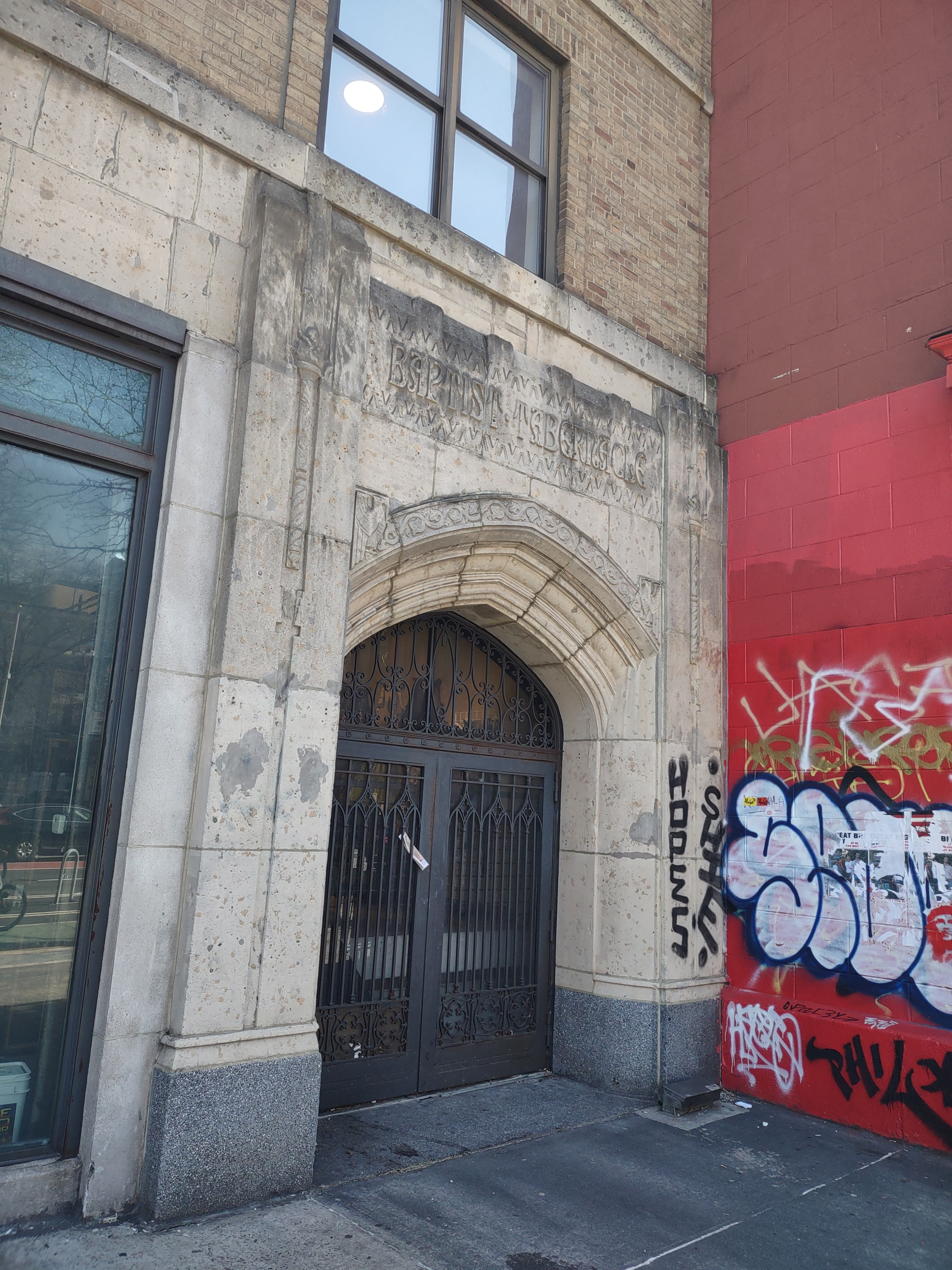
Formal gate theatre in 2025

The Gate Theatre was an Off-Broadway theatre in New York City that was active during the 1950s through 1970s. Located at 162 Second Avenue in the East Village, the theatre was founded in 1957 by Lily Turner. It closed in the early 1970s.

== History ==
In 1957, Lily Turner converted the Second Avenue Baptist Tabernacle quarters at 162 Second Avenue into two theaters – one 250-seat theater and one 135-seat theater – under the names the Gate Theatre and the Cricket Theatre. The Cricket Theatre was in the basement of 162 Second Avenue, and the Gate Theatre was on the street level.

The first production at the Gate Theatre was The Brothers Karamazov, which opened on December 6, 1957 and was adapted from the novel by Jack Sydow and Boris Tumarin. Other productions included Poppa Is Home (1961), Pilgrim's Progress (1962), The Alchemist (1964), A Black Quartet (1969), and Contributions (1970). The final production was Any Resemblance to Persons Living or Dead, which closed on May 30, 1971.

In the 1960s and 1970s, the space above the theatre, knows as the Black Gate Theatre, was used for environmental mixed-media art. Founded by Otto Piene and Aldo Tambellini, it became a hotspot for counterculture film showings and alternative art exhibitions.

In 1977, the Theater for the New City moved into the space. However, due to a 300% rent increase, the group was forced to move again in 1984.

As of 2016, the space is now a clothing store and an empty lot.
