= Jane Milmore =

American playwright and actress (1955–2020)

- Born: March 25, 1955; Laramie, Wyoming, U.S.
- Died: February 4, 2020 (aged 64); Los Angeles, California, U.S.
- Occupations: Playwright, actress, screenwriter, TV producer
- Years active: 1979–2020
- Spouse: Richard Vaczy (m. 2004–2009)
- Relatives: Jennifer Milmore (sister)

Jane Milmore (March 25, 1955 – February 4, 2020) was an American playwright, screenwriter, television producer and actress.

== Biography ==
Born in Laramie, Wyoming, to Joan Marie Judge and John Edward Milmore, Milmore was of Irish descent and was one of five girls, including romance author Kaitlin O'Riley and actress Jennifer Milmore. Raised in New York and New Jersey attending school in Brooklyn, she graduated from Keansburg High School in Keansburg, New Jersey. Milmore married television producer Richard Vaczy, best known for the classic comedy series Golden Girls, on October 24, 2004. The couple split their time between homes in Beverly Hills, California, and Rumson, New Jersey. She died on February 4, 2020, from pancreatic cancer at the age of 64.

== Career ==
Milmore wrote 23 published plays with Billy Van Zandt. She wrote and executive produced numerous television series. She won both a People's Choice and an NAACP award for series Martin, a Prism Award for The Hughleys and was nominated for an Emmy for the CBS special I Love Lucy the Very First Show. As an actress, she appeared in numerous TV series and made-for-TV movies. She also appeared in the feature film A Wake in Providence. She performed Off-Broadway in the shows Silent Laughter, Drop Dead! and You've Got Hate Mail.
